= The Jump series 3 =

The Jump
- Season 3
- Winner: Ben Cohen
- No. of episodes: 6

Release
- Original network: Channel 4
- Original release: 31 January – 6 March 2016

Series chronology
- ← Previous; Series 2 Next → Series 4

The Jump returned for a third series on 31 January 2016. It is once again hosted by Davina McCall live from Austria and it was broadcast weekly instead of its usual nightly format. This was reported to be the last in the series of The Jump due to low ratings, however Channel 4 later denied these rumours as being "categorically untrue".

== Contestants ==
The twelve celebrities taking part were revealed on 16 January 2016. On 4 February, Tina Hobley was forced to withdraw from the competition after dislocating her elbow while training for the ski jump. She was replaced by Tom Parker. On 7 February, Rebecca Adlington was forced to withdraw from the competition and was replaced by series 2 contestant Heather Mills. Also on 7 February, Beth Tweddle withdrew from the series after injuring her back after colliding with a barrier. On 9 February, Mark-Francis Vandelli withdrew from the show after fracturing his ankle during training. They were replaced by Joe Swash and Ben Cohen. On 11 February, Linford Christie withdrew from the competition due to a hamstring injury and was replaced by previously eliminated competitor James Argent. On 13 February, Zara Holland left the series after producers said she was unable to cope with the competition.

Celebrities	Known for	Status
Louisa Lytton	Former EastEnders actress	Eliminated 1st on 31 January 2016
Tina Hobley	Former Holby City actress	Withdrew on 4 February 2016
Rebecca Adlington	Former Olympic freestyle swimmer	Withdrew on 7 February 2016
Beth Tweddle	Olympic artistic gymnast	Withdrew on 7 February 2016
Mark-Francis Vandelli	Made in Chelsea star	Withdrew on 9 February 2016
Linford Christie	Former Olympic sprinter	Withdrew on 11 February 2016
James "Arg" Argent	The Only Way Is Essex star	Eliminated 2nd on 14 February 2016
Joe Swash	Former EastEnders actor & television presenter	Eliminated 3rd on 21 February 2016
Sarah Harding	Former Girls Aloud singer & actress	Withdrew on 26 February 2016
Heather Mills	Businesswoman & animal rights campaigner	Withdrew on 28 February 2016
Brian McFadden	Former Westlife singer & television presenter	Eliminated 4th on 28 February 2016
Tamara Beckwith	Socialite	Eliminated 5th on 6 March 2016
Sid Owen	Former EastEnders actor & singer	Eliminated 6th on 6 March 2016
Tom Parker	The Wanted singer	Third place on 6 March 2016
Dean Cain	The New Adventures of Superman actor	Runner-up on 6 March 2016
Ben Cohen	Former England rugby player	Winner on 6 March 2016

== Live shows ==
The series began on 31 January 2016 and will air weekly until 6 March 2016.

=== Results summary ===
Colour key

–	Celebrity did not take part in this event
–	Celebrity recorded the slowest time/speed in that event and had to perform a live ski/air jump
–	Celebrity recorded the fastest time/speed in each event

Weekly results per celebrity
Celebrity	Week 1	Week 2		Week 3	Week 4	Week 5	Week 6					Number of events
Celebrity	Week 1	Race 1	Race 2	Week 3	Week 4	Week 5	Event 1		Event 2		Final	Number of events
Celebrity	Week 1	Race 1	Race 2	Week 3	Week 4	Week 5	Race 1	Race 2	Race 1	Race 2	Final	Number of events
Ben	Not in competition			DQ	2nd	1st	3rd	1st	1st	—	Winner; 18.25m	5
Dean	9th 45.92	1st	2nd	1st	1st	DNF	2nd	2nd	2nd	2nd	Runner-up; 17.70m	7
Tom	Not in competition	1st	1st	1st	1st	1st	1st	—	3rd	1st	3rd 16.55m	6
Sid	10th 47.53	DNF	—	2nd	2nd	2nd	5th	—	4th	3rd	Eliminated (Week 6)	7
Tamara	4th 45.67	1st	3rd	2nd	1st	DNF	4th	3rd	Eliminated (Week 6)			6
Brian	11th 49.42	3rd	—	2nd	1st	3rd	Eliminated (Week 5)					5
Heather	Not in competition			1st	DNF	Withdrew (Week 5)						2
Sarah	6th 45.76	2nd	1st	1st	2nd	Withdrew (Week 5)						4
Joe	Not in competition			DQ	—	Eliminated (Week 4)						1
Arg	12th DNF	2nd	2nd	2nd	Re-Eliminated (Week 3)							3
Linford	7th 45.82	—	—	Withdrew (Week 3)								1
Mark-Francis	2nd 44.98	2nd	DNF	Withdrew (Week 3)								2
Beth	1st 44.87	Withdrew (Week 2)										1
Rebecca	8th 45.91	Withdrew (Week 2)										1
Tina	3rd 45.12	Withdrew (Week 2)										1
Louisa	5th 45.71	Eliminated (Week 1)										1
Live ski/air jump	Adlington, Argent, Beckwith, Cain, Lytton, Owen	Argent, McFadden, Owen, Vandelli		Argent, Beckwith, Cohen, Owen, McFadden, Swash	Cohen, Harding, Mills, Owen, Swash	Beckwith, Cain, McFadden, Owen	Beckwith, Cain, Owen		None			
Eliminated	Louisa Lytton; 7.87m	James "Arg" Argent; 8.60m		James "Arg" Argent; 8.27m	Joe Swash; 8.31m	Brian McFadden; 9.72m	Tamara Beckwith; 15.90m		Sid Owen; Lost event		Tom Parker; 16.55m	
Eliminated	Louisa Lytton; 7.87m	James "Arg" Argent; 8.60m		James "Arg" Argent; 8.27m	Joe Swash; 8.31m	Brian McFadden; 9.72m	Tamara Beckwith; 15.90m		Sid Owen; Lost event		Dean Cain; 17.70m	
Reference(s)												

=== Episode details ===
==== Week 1 (31 January) ====
- Event: Skeleton
- Location: Igls Sliding Centre

Race	Celebrity	Time (seconds)	Overall leaderboard	Result
1	Dean Cain	45.92	9th	Bottom six
1	Linford Christie	45.82	7th	Safe
2	Brian McFadden	49.42	11th	Safe
2	Arg	DNF	12th	Bottom six
3	Louisa Lytton	45.71	5th	Bottom six
3	Beth Tweddle	44.87	1st	Safe
4	Sid Owen	47.53	10th	Bottom six
4	Mark-Francis Vandelli	44.98	2nd	Safe
5	Tina Hobley	45.12	3rd	Safe
5	Tamara Beckwith	45.67	4th	Bottom six
6	Rebecca Adlington	45.91	8th	Bottom six
6	Sarah Harding	45.76	6th	Safe

Live air jump details

Order	Celebrity	Height (metres)	Result
1	Dean Cain	9.35	Safe
2	Arg	8.40	Safe
3	Louisa Lytton	7.87	Eliminated
4	Rebecca Adlington	8.85	Safe
5	Sid Owen	9.43	Safe
6	Tamara Beckwith	8.50	Safe

==== Week 2 (7 February) ====
- Event: Snow cross
- Location: Kühtai Saddle

Race	Celebrity	Leaderboard	Result
1	Dean Cain	1st	Safe
1	Arg	2nd	In Race 4
1	Brian McFadden	3rd	Bottom four
2	Tom Parker	1st	Safe
2	Mark-Francis Vandelli	2nd	In Race 4
2	Sid Owen	DNF	Bottom four
3	Tamara Beckwith	1st	Safe
3	Sarah Harding	2nd	In Race 4
4	Sarah Harding	1st	Safe
4	Arg	2nd	Bottom four
4	Mark-Francis Vandelli	DNF	Bottom four
5	Tom Parker	1st	Safe
5	Dean Cain	2nd	Safe
5	Tamara Beckwith	3rd	Safe

Live air jump details

Order	Celebrity	Height (metres)	Result
1	Sid Owen	9.04	Safe
2	Brian McFadden	9.41	Safe
3	Arg	8.60	Eliminated
4	Mark-Francis Vandelli	9.09	Safe

==== Week 3 (14 February) ====
- Event: Parallel slalom
- Location: Kühtai Saddle

Race	Celebrity	Overall leaderboard	Result
1	Heather Mills	1st	Safe
1	Tamara Beckwith	2nd	Bottom six
2	Dean Cain	1st	Safe
2	Sid Owen	2nd	Bottom six
3	Sarah Harding	1st	Safe
3	Arg	2nd	Bottom six
4	Tom Parker	1st	Safe
4	Brian McFadden	2nd	Bottom six
5	Joe Swash	Disqualified	Bottom six
5	Ben Cohen	Disqualified	Bottom six
6	Dean Cain	1st	Safe
6	Heather Mills	2nd	Safe

Live air jump details

Order	Celebrity	Height (metres)	Result
1	Tamara Beckwith	8.55	Safe
2	Sid Owen	8.91	Safe
3	Arg	8.27	Eliminated
4	Brian McFadden	8.99	Safe
5	Ben Cohen	9.42	Safe
6	Joe Swash	8.67	Safe

==== Week 4 (21 February) ====
- Event: Moguls
- Location: Kühtai Saddle

Race	Celebrity	Overall leaderboard	Result
1	Tamara Beckwith	1st	Safe
1	Sid Owen	2nd	Bottom five
2	Dean Cain	1st	Safe
2	Heather Mills	DNF	Bottom five
3	Tom Parker	1st	Safe
3	Ben Cohen	2nd	Bottom five
4	Brian McFadden	1st	Safe
4	Sarah Harding	2nd	Bottom five
5	Dean Cain	1st	Safe
5	Tom Parker	2nd	Safe

Live air/ski jump details

Order	Celebrity	Height/Distance (metres)	Result
1	Sid Owen	14.70	Safe
2	Heather Mills	14.55	Safe
3	Sarah Harding	8.59	Safe
4	Ben Cohen	9.21	Safe
5	Joe Swash	8.31	Eliminated

==== Week 5: Semi-final (28 February) ====
- Event: Ski cross
- Location: Kühtai Saddle

Race	Celebrity	Leaderboard	Result
1	Tom Parker	1st	Safe
1	Dean Cain	DNF	Bottom four
1	Tamara Beckwith	DNF	Bottom four
2	Ben Cohen	1st	Safe
2	Sid Owen	2nd	Bottom four
2	Brian McFadden	3rd	Bottom four
3	Tom Parker	1st	Safe
3	Ben Cohen	2nd	Safe

Live air/ski jump details

Order	Celebrity	Height/Distance (metres)	Result
1	Dean Cain	14.25	Safe
2	Sid Owen	15.60	Safe
3	Brian McFadden	9.72	Eliminated
4	Tamara Beckwith	13.75	Safe

==== Week 6: Final (6 March) ====
- Event Snow cross
- Location: Kühtai Saddle

Race	Celebrity	Leaderboard	Result
1	Tom Parker	1st	Safe
1	Dean Cain	2nd	In Race 2
1	Ben Cohen	3rd	In Race 2
1	Tamara Beckwith	4th	In Race 2
1	Sid Owen	5th	Bottom three
2	Ben Cohen	1st	Safe
2	Dean Cain	2nd	Bottom three
2	Tamara Beckwith	3rd	Bottom three

Live ski jump details (Round 1)

Order	Celebrity	Distance (metres)	Result
1	Sid Owen	18.85	Safe
2	Tamara Beckwith	15.90	Eliminated
3	Dean Cain	18.20	Safe

Event: Ski cross

Race	Celebrity	Leaderboard	Result
1	Ben Cohen	1st	Safe
1	Dean Cain	2nd	In Race 2
1	Tom Parker	3rd	In Race 2
1	Sid Owen	4th	In Race 2
2	Tom Parker	1st	Safe
2	Dean Cain	2nd	Safe
2	Sid Owen	3rd	Eliminated

Live ski jump details (Round 2)

Order	Celebrity	Distance (metres)	Result
1	Ben Cohen	18.25	Winner
2	Tom Parker	16.55	Third place
3	Dean Cain	17.70	Runner-up

== Ratings ==
Official ratings are taken from BARB, and include C4+1

Episode	Air date	UK viewers (millions)	C4 weekly rank
1	31 January	2.41	1
2	7 February	2.05	4
3	14 February	2.24	4
4	21 February	1.88	8
5	28 February	1.87	9
6	6 March	1.87	7

== Criticism ==
Several viewers have demanded that the show be cancelled following the reported injuries of three castmembers in just the first two weeks of filming. Tina Hobley suffered a dislocated elbow on 4 February. She was released, but has left the competition. On 7 February, it was announced that Rebecca Adlington would leave the show following a dislocated shoulder and Beth Tweddle would also leave the show following a broken neck. Similarly, Tom Parker tore ligaments in his hand.
