= The Jump series 1 =

The Jump
- Season 1
- Winner: Joe McElderry
- No. of episodes: 8

Release
- Original network: Channel 4
- Original release: 26 January – 3 February 2014

Series chronology
- Next → Series 2

The Jump began airing its first series live on Channel 4 from 26 January 2014 for 8 non-consecutive nights ending on 3 February 2014. The series was presented by Davina McCall and Alex Brooker. The celebrities were trained by Amy Williams and Graham Bell, with Eddie "The Eagle" Edwards mentoring them.

== Contestants ==
The twelve original celebrities taking part were revealed on 11 December 2013.

Two of the original line-up withdrew from the show before it began: it was announced on 13 January 2014 that socialite Tara Palmer-Tomkinson had quit the show and been replaced by Laura Hamilton, while actor Sam J. Jones withdrew the following day due to a shoulder injury, to be replaced by Ritchie Neville.

When the series began, it was revealed that Joe McElderry and Donal MacIntyre were also training as standby competitors. When Henry Conway withdrew from the competition on 28 January 2014 following a hand injury, a live ski jump-off was contested between McElderry and MacIntyre, with McElderry winning and thus taking Conway's place. However, MacIntyre joined the following day, when Melinda Messenger was forced to withdraw due to concussion. On 3 February 2014, prior to the evening's final, Sir Steve Redgrave and Marcus Brigstocke were forced to withdraw due to injuries they suffered during training.

Celebrity	Known for	Status
Nicky Clarke	Celebrity hairdresser	Eliminated 1st on 26 January 2014
Amy Childs	Former The Only Way Is Essex star	Eliminated 2nd on 27 January 2014
Henry Conway	Socialite, party promoter, & fashion journalist	Withdrew on 28 January 2014
Darren Gough	England cricketer	Eliminated 3rd on 28 January 2014
Melinda Messenger	Former glamour model & presenter	Withdrew on 29 January 2014
Sinitta	Pop singer & The X Factor mentor	Eliminated 4th on 29 January 2014
Laura Hamilton	Television presenter	Eliminated 5th on 30 January 2014
Kimberly Wyatt	Former The Pussycat Dolls singer	Eliminated 6th on 31 January 2014
Anthea Turner	Television presenter	Eliminated 7th on 2 February 2014
Ritchie Neville	Five singer	Fifth place on 2 February 2014
Steve Redgrave	Retired British Olympic rower	Withdrew on 3 February 2014
Marcus Brigstocke	Satire comedian & actor	Withdrew on 3 February 2014
Donal MacIntyre	Investigative journalist & presenter	Runner-up on 3 February 2014
Joe McElderry	Former The X Factor singer	Winner on 3 February 2014

== Live shows ==
The series began airing on 26 January 2014 for eight days, there was no show on 1 February, until the final on 3 February 2014. During the live ski jump, the celebrities are given the option of three jumps – K15 (small), K24 (medium) or K40 with the largest. The celebrity that jumps the shortest distance is eliminated. From Day 5 onwards the K15 jump was removed from the competition.

=== Results summary ===
Colour key

–	Celebrity did not take part in this event
–	Celebrity recorded the slowest time/speed in that event and had to perform a live ski jump
–	Celebrity recorded the fastest time/speed in each event

Daily results per celebrity
Celebrity	Day 1	Day 2	Day 3^{1}	Day 4^{2}	Day 5	Day 6^{3}			Day 7		Day 8		Number of events
Celebrity	Day 1	Day 2	Day 3^{1}	Day 4^{2}	Day 5	Race 1	Race 2	Race 3	Event 1	Event 2	Event	Final	Number of events
Joe	Not in competition			—N/a	4th 59.87	2nd	2nd	2nd	3rd 111.01	Won	2nd	Winner; 17.5m	5
Donal	Not in competition				8th DQ	3rd	3rd	3rd	4th 110.33	Lost	1st	Runner-up; 13.5m	5
Marcus	2nd 44.75	—N/a	2nd 45.246	—N/a	5th 59.88	1st	1st	1st	2nd 111.56	Won	DNF	Withdrew (Day 8)	7
Steve	1st 39.30	—N/a	3rd 45.786	—N/a	1st 58.46	DNS	DNS	DNS	1st 114.17	Won	Withdrew (Day 8)		5
Ritchie	6th 54.79	—N/a	1st 44.814	—N/a	3rd 59.66	5th	5th	—N/a	5th 110.23	Lost	Eliminated (Day 7)		6
Anthea	—N/a	4th 45.413	—N/a	3rd 56.14	6th 60.25	6th	—N/a	—N/a	6th 103.83	Lost	Eliminated (Day 7)		6
Kimberly	—N/a	1st 44.180	—N/a	1st 53.44	2nd 59.56	4th	4th	4th	Eliminated (Day 6)				4
Laura	—N/a	3rd 45.396	—N/a	2nd 55.70	7th 60.25	Eliminated (Day 5)							3
Sinitta	—N/a	6th 45.951	—N/a	4th 60.14	Eliminated (Day 4)								2
Melinda	—N/a	2nd 44.604	—N/a	Withdrew (Day 4)									1
Darren	3rd 47.47	—N/a	4th 47.418	Eliminated (Day 3)									2
Henry	4th 47.77	—N/a	Withdrew (Day 3)										1
Amy	—N/a	5th 45.705	Eliminated (Day 2)										1
Nicky	5th 53.21	Eliminated (Day 1)											1
Live ski jump	Clarke, Neville	Childs, Sinitta	Gough, Redgrave	Sinitta, Turner	Hamilton, MacIntyre	Neville, Redgrave, Turner, Wyatt			None	MacIntryre, Neville, Turner	None		
Eliminated	Nicky Clarke; K15; 9.5m	Amy Childs; K15; Did not jump	Darren Gough; K15; 12.0m	Sinitta; K15; 9.5m	Laura Hamilton; K24; 13.0m	Kimberly Wyatt; K24; Foul			None	Anthea Turner; K24; 14.0m	Donal MacIntyre; K24; 13.5m		
Eliminated	Nicky Clarke; K15; 9.5m	Amy Childs; K15; Did not jump	Darren Gough; K15; 12.0m	Sinitta; K15; 9.5m	Laura Hamilton; K24; 13.0m	Kimberly Wyatt; K24; Foul			None	Ritchie Neville; K24; Foul	Donal MacIntyre; K24; 13.5m		
Reference(s)									None				

- ^1 Due to Conway pulling out due to injury, McElderry joined the competition after winning a live ski-jump against Donal MacIntyre on Day 3.
- ^2 Due to Messenger's pulling out, McIntyre joined the competition on Day 4.
- ^3 There was no episode on 1 February.

=== Episode details ===
==== Episode 1 (26 January) ====
- Event: Men's Giant slalom
- Location: Kühtai

Order	Celebrity	Time (seconds)	Leaderboard	Result
1	Darren Gough	47.74	3rd	Safe
2	Ritchie Neville	54.79	6th	Bottom two
3	Marcus Brigstocke	44.75	2nd	Safe
4	Henry Conway	47.77	4th	Safe
5	Sir Steve Redgrave	39.30	1st	Safe
6	Nicky Clarke	53.21	5th	Bottom two

Live ski jump details

Order	Celebrity	Type	Distance (metres)	Result
1	Ritchie Neville	K15	11.0	Safe
2	Nicky Clarke	K15	9.5	Eliminated

==== Episode 2 (27 January) ====
- Event: Women's Skeleton
- Location: Igls sliding centre

Order	Celebrity	Time (seconds)	Leaderboard	Result
1	Sinitta	45.951	6th	Bottom two
2	Anthea Turner	45.413	4th	Safe
3	Melinda Messenger	44.604	2nd	Safe
4	Kimberly Wyatt	44.180	1st	Safe
5	Laura Hamilton	45.369	3rd	Safe
6	Amy Childs	45.705	5th	Bottom two

Live ski jump details

Order	Celebrity	Type	Distance (metres)	Result
1	Amy Childs	K15	—N/a	Eliminated
2	Sinitta	K15	10.0	Safe

==== Episode 3 (28 January) ====
- Event: Men's Skeleton
- Location: Igls sliding centre

At the beginning of the show it was revealed that Conway had to pull out of the competition due to injury during training for the Skeleton. It was then revealed that Joe McElderry and Donal MacIntyre had been training as standbys, and that one of them would join the competition to replace Conway. They both had to complete a live ski-jump, with the celebrity jumping the furthest joining the competition. They both jumped from the K24, with McElderry jumping 15.0 meters and MacIntyre jumping 11.5 meters meaning that McElderry joined the competition to replace Conway.

Order	Celebrity	Time (seconds)	Leaderboard	Result
1	Marcus Brigstocke	45.246	2nd	Safe
2	Darren Gough	47.418	4th	Bottom two
3	Sir Steve Redgrave	45.786	3rd	Bottom two
4	Ritchie Neville	44.814	1st	Safe

Live ski jump details

Order	Celebrity	Type	Distance (metres)	Result
1	Darren Gough	K15	12.0	Eliminated
2	Sir Steve Redgrave	K24	14.5	Safe

==== Episode 4 (29 January) ====
- Event: Women's Giant slalom
- Location: Kühtai

At the start of the show it was announced that Messenger had to pull out due to concussion during training for the Bobsleigh event. She was replaced by Donal MacIntyre who initially lost out to McElderry in the ski-jump on Day 3.

Order	Celebrity	Time (seconds)	Leaderboard	Result
1	Kimberly Wyatt	53.44	1st	Safe
2	Laura Hamilton	55.70	2nd	Safe
3	Sinitta	60.14	4th	Bottom two
4	Anthea Turner	56.14	3rd	Bottom two

Live ski jump details

Order	Celebrity	Type	Distance (metres)	Result
1	Sinitta	K15	9.5	Eliminated
2	Anthea Turner	K24	11.0	Safe

==== Episode 5 (30 January) ====
- Event: Bobsleigh
- Location: Igls sliding centre

From this point onwards the K15 jump was removed from the competition. Although Redgrave took part in the event, he was not present during the live show following an accident which happened after the event took place.

Order	Celebrity	Time (seconds)	Leaderboard	Result
1	Ritchie Neville	59.66	3rd	Safe
2	Kimberly Wyatt	59.56	2nd	Safe
3	Donal MacIntyre	DQ	8th	Bottom two
4	Marcus Brigstocke	59.88	5th	Safe
5	Joe McElderry	59.87	4th	Safe
6	Anthea Turner	60.24	6th	Safe
7	Sir Steve Redgrave	58.46	1st	Safe
8	Laura Hamilton	60.25	7th	Bottom two

Live ski jump details

Order	Celebrity	Type	Distance (metres)	Result
1	Donal MacIntyre	K24	13.5	Safe
2	Laura Hamilton	K24	13.0	Eliminated

==== Episode 6 (31 January) ====
- Event: Speed skating
- Location: OlympiaWorld Innsbruck (outdoor rink)

Order	Celebrity	Heat 1	Semi-final	Final	Result
N/A	Marcus Brigstocke	1st	1st	1st	Safe
N/A	Joe McElderry	2nd	2nd	2nd	Safe
N/A	Donal MacIntyre	3rd	3rd	3rd	Safe
N/A	Kimberly Wyatt	4th	4th	4th	Bottom three
N/A	Ritchie Neville	5th	5th	—N/a	Bottom three
N/A	Anthea Turner	6th	—N/a	—N/a	Bottom three

Live ski jump details

Order	Celebrity	Type	Distance (metres)	Result
1	Anthea Turner	K24	13.0	Safe
2	Ritchie Neville	K24	11.5	Safe
3	Kimberly Wyatt	K24	Foul	Eliminated
4	Sir Steve Redgrave	K24	9.0	Safe

==== Episode 7: Semi-final (2 February) ====
- Event 1: Speed skiing and Slalom
- Location: Kühtai

Order	Celebrity	Speed skiing		Slalom			Result
Order	Celebrity	Speed (km/h)	Overall leaderboard	Race 1	Race 2	Race 3	Result
1	Donal MacIntyre	110.33	4th	Joe	Joe	—N/a	Bottom three
1	Joe McElderry	111.01	3rd	Joe	Joe	—N/a	Safe
2	Ritchie Neville	110.23	5th	Marcus	Marcus	—N/a	Bottom three
2	Marcus Brigstocke	111.56	2nd	Marcus	Marcus	—N/a	Safe
5	Anthea Turner	108.83	6th	Sir Steve	Sir Steve	—N/a	Bottom three
5	Sir Steve Redgrave	114.17	1st	Sir Steve	Sir Steve	—N/a	Safe

Live ski jump details

Order	Celebrity	Type	Distance (metres)	Result
1	Donal MacIntyre	K24	15.5	Safe
1	Donal MacIntyre	K24	17.5	Safe
2	Ritchie Neville	K24	16.0	Eliminated
2	Ritchie Neville	K24	Foul	Eliminated
3	Anthea Turner	K24	14.0	Eliminated
3	Anthea Turner	—N/a	—N/a	Eliminated

==== Episode 8: Final (3 February) ====
- Events: Ski cross
- Location: Kühtai

Order	Celebrity	Race 1	Race 2	Result
N/A	Donal MacIntyre	2nd	1st	Safe
N/A	Joe McElderry	1st	DNF	Safe
N/A	Marcus Brigstocke	DNF	—N/a	Withdrew

Live ski jump details

Order	Celebrity	Type	Distance (metres)	Result
1	Donal MacIntyre	K24	12.0	Runner up
4	Donal MacIntyre	K24	13.5	Runner up
2	Joe McElderry	K24	15.0	Winner
3	Joe McElderry	K40	17.5	Winner

== Ratings ==
Official ratings are taken from BARB, but do not include Channel 4 +1.

Episode	Air date	Official rating (millions)	Share (%)
1	26 January	2.62	8.4
2	27 January	2.36	8.6
3	28 January	2.20	8.3
4	29 January	2.32	8.9
5	30 January	1.87	7.3
6	31 January	2.13	8.1
7	2 February	1.90	6.7
8	3 February	1.89	6.4
