= Ben Cohen (rugby union) =

English rugby union player (born 1978)

Ben Cohen MBE
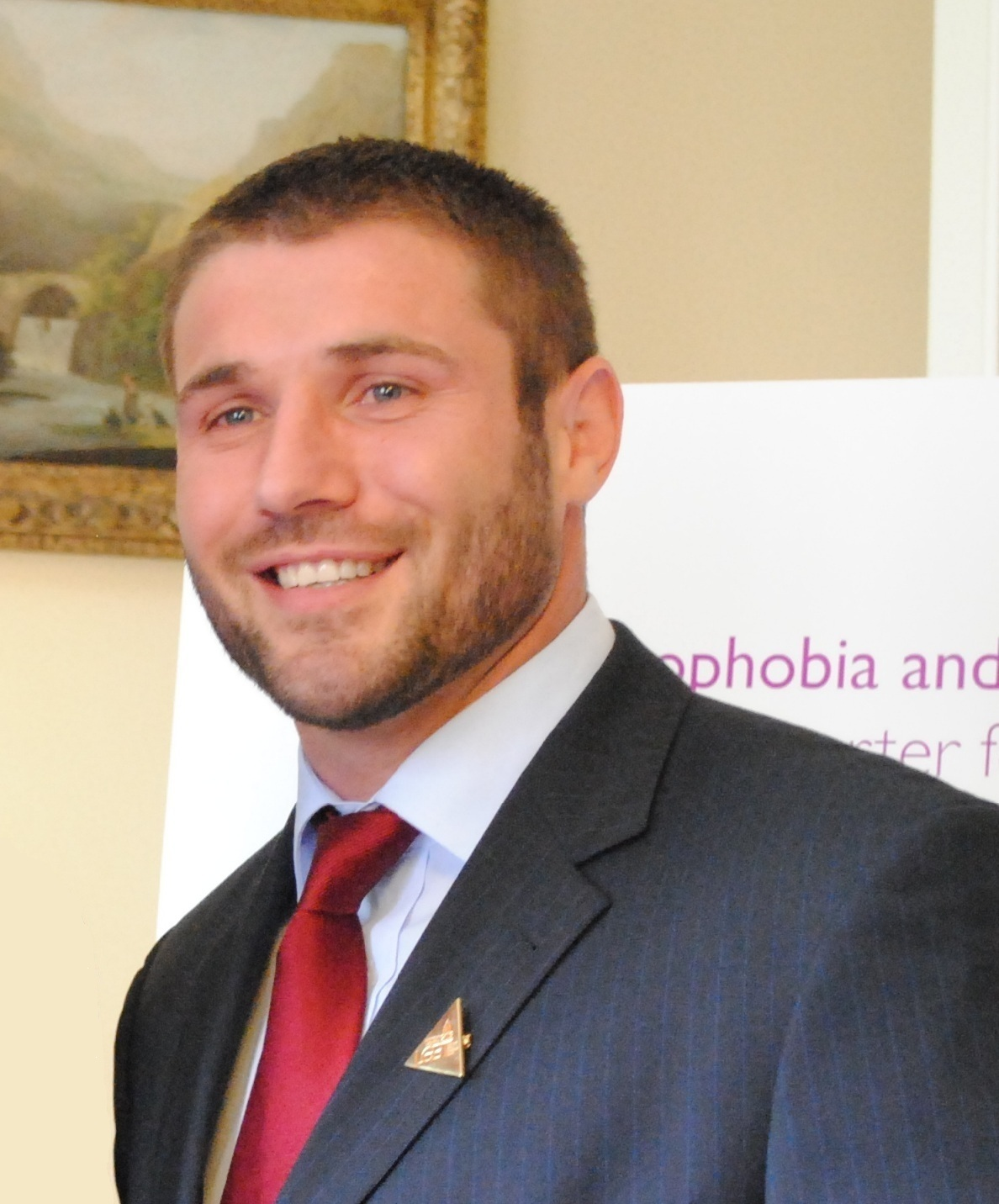
- Cohen in 2011
- Born: Ben Christopher Cohen; 14 September 1978 (age 48) Northampton, Northamptonshire, England, UK
- Height: 1.88 m (6 ft 2 in)
- Weight: 227 lb (103 kg; 16.2 st)
- Notable relative: George Cohen (uncle)

Rugby union career
- Position(s): Wing, Outside Centre
Youth career
- Northampton Old Scouts RFC
Senior career
Years	Team	Apps	(Points)
1996–2007	Northampton	146	(320)
2007–2009	Brive	16	(25)
2009–2011	Sale Sharks	48	(55)
International career
Years	Team	Apps	(Points)
2000–2006	England	57	(155)

Ben Christopher Cohen, MBE (born 14 September 1978) is an English activist and former rugby player. He began his professional career with Northampton Saints in 1996; in 2007 he moved to France to represent Brive before returning to England two years later to join Sale Sharks.

Cohen was a member of the England team that won the 2003 Rugby World Cup. His main position was winger. In May 2011, Cohen retired from professional rugby. He founded The Ben Cohen StandUp Foundation to combat homophobia and bullying.

== Early life ==
Cohen was born in Northampton. He was educated at Kingsthorpe Upper School (Kingsthorpe College as known today), which was not a rugby playing school and at age 12, he first started playing with Northampton Old Scouts RFC.

Regarding his background, Cohen has stated, "My family's not Jewish, but a few generations back they used to be. I think it was my great-grandfather that married a non-Jewish girl and broke with tradition."

== Club career ==
=== Northampton ===
When he was 17 he joined Northampton Saints and made his first team debut against Treorchy in the 1996/97 season, following which his name was rarely left off the team sheet. Cohen had long been linked with a move away from the club. Whilst at Northampton he started in the victorious 2000 Heineken Cup Final as they defeated Munster.

=== Brive ===
Following his release from contract from Northampton RFC in 2007, Cohen had been linked with midlands rivals Leicester Tigers, other English and French rugby union clubs and a switch of codes to rugby league at Harlequins or Wigan. His future had remained uncertain after he failed to join a Guinness Premiership club, several games into the season. He was selected for the Barbarians, appearing in the game wearing the socks of his first club, Northampton Old Scouts RFC. It was rumoured of a move to Harlequins RL with then chairman Ian Lenagan supposedly talking to Cohen over recent months, however nothing official was ever announced and he shortly afterwards signed for Brive.

Cohen signed a deal with Brive who play in the Top 14 competition in France. Fellow 2003 World Cup-winning and Northampton Saints teammate Steve Thompson was also at the club. He signed a contract until 2009. Cohen's move to the Limousin based club came after Cohen had stated "I won't be moving house."

=== Sale Sharks ===
In March 2009, Sale Sharks announced the signing of Cohen from Brive on a two-year contract. The move was called a "coup" by Sale's director of rugby, Kingsley Jones. At the time Cohen believed that he could make a return to international rugby through representing Sale. Unable to participate in Sale's pre-season warm-up matches for the 2009/10 season, Cohen made his competitive debut for Sale in September 2009 in a Guinness Premiership fixture against Exeter. The following month, Cohen scored his first try for Sale in a 36–17 defeat to Toulouse in the Heineken Cup. Cohen is one of the club's senior players and plays a role in developing Sale's young players.

In September 2010, he noted that "I'm coming towards the end of my career and I've learnt a hell of a lot over the course of my career from some of the best coaches in the world. I think you've got to pass some of that experience down ... You have to have that blend of experience and youth and helping the younger guys out is something that I enjoy doing anyway." In late December, Cohen picked up a knee injury during Sale's 54–21 defeat to Leicester that side-lined him for six to eight weeks. It was announced in March that Cohen's contract with Sale would not be renewed and he would be leaving the club at the end of the season. He commented that "Sale don't want me anymore because they're trying to spend more money in the pack".

Cohen, who represented Sale in over 50 matches, also said that if he could not secure a contract with a Premiership club he would consider retiring. On 15 May 2011, Cohen announced his retirement from the sport to focus on his anti-bullying campaign.

== Representative career ==
At the time of his retirement, Cohen was third in the list of all time England try scorers behind Rory Underwood and Will Greenwood.

In February 2000, Cohen made his England debut against Ireland in the inaugural Six Nations Championship, scoring two tries. In June 2001, he joined the Lions tour to Australia, and although he did not figure in the Tests series, he did score twice in the midweek match against New South Wales Country Cockatoos at Coffs Harbour.

During the 2002–03 season, he played in all of England's matches, scoring against the All Blacks and putting in a try-saving tackle on Ben Blair, he scored twice against the Australians at Twickenham. He also scored against Australia in June 2003 as England won by 25–14, to complete their southern hemisphere tour unbeaten. In England's successful World Cup campaign, he started in all but one of England's matches.

In the 2004 Six Nations, Cohen was named man of the match against Wales, partly for two striking tries. He was a replacement in two of England's 2004 Autumn internationals.

Cohen initially endured a difficult time after helping England lift the World Cup, admitting that he had lost his appetite for the game and he did not feature in the 2005 Six Nations Championship. However, strong club form saw him win a try-scoring recall against Australia in November 2005. He stayed among the England setup throughout 2006 and during the Autumn internationals, but missed out on the Elite England squad for the 2007 Six Nations.

He regained a place in the squad for the summer tour of South Africa and raised the prospects for the 2007 Rugby World Cup. However, in May 2007, Cohen ruled himself out of both England's summer tour and the World Cup, stating that he wished to spend time with his pregnant wife.

=== International tries ===
Try	Opposing team	Location	Venue	Competition	Date	Result	Score
1	Ireland	London, England	Twickenham Stadium	2000 Six Nations Championship	5 February 2000	Win	50 – 18
2	Ireland	London, England	Twickenham Stadium	2000 Six Nations Championship	5 February 2000	Win	50 – 18
3	Wales	London, England	Twickenham Stadium	2000 Six Nations Championship	4 March 2000	Win	46 – 12
4	Italy	Rome, Italy	Stadio Flaminio	2000 Six Nations Championship	18 March 2000	Win	12 – 59
5	Italy	Rome, Italy	Stadio Flaminio	2000 Six Nations Championship	18 March 2000	Win	12 – 59
6	Argentina	London, England	Twickenham Stadium	2000 end-of-year rugby union internationals	25 November 2000	Win	19 – 0
7	Wales	Cardiff, Wales	Millennium Stadium	2001 Six Nations Championship	3 February 2001	Win	15 – 44
8	Italy	London, England	Twickenham Stadium	2001 Six Nations Championship	17 February 2001	Win	80 – 23
9	Romania	London, England	Twickenham Stadium	2001 end-of-year rugby union internationals	17 November 2001	Win	134 – 0
10	Romania	London, England	Twickenham Stadium	2001 end-of-year rugby union internationals	17 November 2001	Win	134 – 0
11	Romania	London, England	Twickenham Stadium	2001 end-of-year rugby union internationals	17 November 2001	Win	134 – 0
12	Scotland	Edinburgh, Scotland	Murrayfield Stadium	2002 Six Nations Championship	2 February 2002	Win	3 – 29
13	Ireland	London, England	Twickenham Stadium	2002 Six Nations Championship	16 February 2002	Win	45 – 11
14	France	Saint-Denis, France	Stade de France	2002 Six Nations Championship	2 March 2002	Loss	20 – 15
15	Italy	Rome, Italy	Stadio Flaminio	2002 Six Nations Championship	7 April 2002	Win	9 – 45
16	New Zealand	London, England	Twickenham Stadium	2002 end-of-year rugby union internationals	9 November 2002	Win	31 – 28
17	Australia	London, England	Twickenham Stadium	2002 end-of-year rugby union internationals	16 November 2002	Win	32 – 31
18	Australia	London, England	Twickenham Stadium	2002 end-of-year rugby union internationals	16 November 2002	Win	32 – 31
19	South Africa	London, England	Twickenham Stadium	2002 end-of-year rugby union internationals	23 November 2002	Win	53 – 3
20	Scotland	London, England	Twickenham Stadium	2003 Six Nations Championship	22 March 2003	Win	40 – 9
21	Australia	Melbourne, Australia	Docklands Stadium	2003 England rugby union tour of the Southern Hemisphere	21 June 2003	Win	14 – 25
22	France	London, England	Twickenham Stadium	2003 Rugby World Cup warm-up matches	6 September 2003	Win	45 – 14
23	France	London, England	Twickenham Stadium	2003 Rugby World Cup warm-up matches	6 September 2003	Win	45 – 14
24	Georgia	Perth, Australia	Subiaco Oval	2003 Rugby World Cup	12 October 2003	Win	84 – 6
25	Georgia	Perth, Australia	Subiaco Oval	2003 Rugby World Cup	12 October 2003	Win	84 – 6
26	Scotland	Edinburgh, Scotland	Murrayfield Stadium	2004 Six Nations Championship	21 February 2004	Win	13 – 35
27	Wales	London, England	Twickenham Stadium	2004 Six Nations Championship	20 March 2004	Win	31 – 21
28	Wales	London, England	Twickenham Stadium	2004 Six Nations Championship	20 March 2004	Win	31 – 21
29	France	Saint-Denis, France	Stade de France	2004 Six Nations Championship	27 March 2004	Loss	24 – 21
30	Australia	London, England	Twickenham Stadium	2005 end-of-year rugby union internationals	12 November 2005	Win	26 – 16
31	New Zealand	London, England	Twickenham Stadium	2006 end-of-year rugby union internationals	5 November 2006	Loss	20 – 41

== The Ben Cohen StandUp Foundation ==
In 2011, Cohen founded The Ben Cohen StandUp Foundation, Inc., which is, according to its website, "the world's first foundation dedicated to raising awareness of the long-term, damaging effects of bullying, and funding those doing real-world work to stop it".

Following his retirement he announced plans to focus on the Foundation.

== Personal life ==
In November 2000, Cohen's father Peter Cohen, brother of English World Cup winning football player George Cohen, was fatally injured while protecting an attack victim at the Eternity nightclub in Northampton, which he managed. He died a month later from head injuries sustained in the assault. Three men were found guilty of violent conduct.

Cohen has tinnitus and is clinically deaf, with about 30 to 33 percent hearing loss in each ear. He has been involved in efforts to make rugby more accessible to the hard of hearing, especially young deaf players.

During March 2011 High and Mighty, the big and tall menswear specialist, appointed Cohen as the new face of the brand for 2011.

Cohen was married to Abby Blayney in 2003, and they had twin daughters in 2008. The couple separated in 2014, and divorced in March 2016. On 13 November 2022, Cohen and Kristina Rihanoff, with whom he had a daughter in 2016, announced their engagement.

=== Status as a gay icon ===
Cohen appeared on the cover of Compete Magazine July 2011 issue and the cover of Out in August 2011.

On 18 June 2013, he was named as one of the initial inductees to the National Gay and Lesbian Sports Hall of Fame newly established in Chicago, Illinois, United States.

In 2010, Cohen donated a signed jockstrap to support GMFA, a British charity addressing gay men's health issues, which was sold at auction at the Royal Vauxhall Tavern. He also featured on the front cover and in an interview section of GMFA's printed FS Magazine in November 2010.

Cohen founded The Ben Cohen StandUp Foundation to combat bullying, and he has specifically noted homophobia as one of the bullying problems on the StandUp agenda.

== TV ==
In September 2013, Cohen took part as a contestant in the eleventh series of Strictly Come Dancing. He was partnered with Russian professional dancer Kristina Rihanoff. The couple were later eliminated from the competition.

In January 2016, Cohen took part as a contestant on the third series of The Jump, as a replacement for Mark-Francis Vandelli. He later won the series on 6 March 2016, beating Dean Cain.

In 2017, Cohen was a contestant on season 7, episode 8 of The Celebrity Chase.

In January 2018, he participated in And They're Off! in aid of Sport Relief.

In December 2023, Cohen participated in ITV's The Real Full Monty to raise awareness of cancer. In 2026 he appeared in SAS: Who Dares Wins.

== See also ==
- List of top English points scorers and try scorers
