= The Jump series 4 =

The Jump
- Season 4
- Winner: Spencer Matthews
- No. of episodes: 6

Release
- Original network: Channel 4
- Original release: 5 February – 12 March 2017

Series chronology
- ← Previous; Series 3

The Jump returned for a fourth series on 5 February 2017. It is once again hosted by Davina McCall from Austria and it is broadcast weekly, same as last series. It ended on 12 March 2017 with Spencer Matthews beating favourite Louis Smith to be crowned Jump Champion 2017.

== Contestants ==
The full line-up was confirmed by Channel 4 on 3 January 2017. Whilst not officially confirmed, it has been revealed that model Amy Willerton and former X Factor contestant Jake Quickenden have also been training as reserve contestants. It was confirmed on 2 February 2017 that model and DJ Vogue Williams had to pull out of the show due to a knee injury, she was replaced by Amy Willerton. On 13 February it was confirmed that Sir Bradley was pull out of the show due to a broken leg. Caprice pulled out of the show on 27 February 2017 due to illness after failing to appear on the previous nights episode. On 7 March 2017, Gareth Thomas withdrew from the show for "personal reasons". Lydia Bright replaced him for the final, as she was the last celebrity to have been eliminated.

Celebrity	Known for	Status
Josie Gibson	Big Brother 11 winner	Eliminated 1st on 5 February 2017
Mark Dolan	Comedian & television presenter	Eliminated 2nd on 12 February 2017
Robbie Fowler	Former England footballer	Eliminated 3rd on 19 February 2017
Bradley Wiggins	Former road & track racing cyclist	Withdrew on 26 February 2017
Jade Jones	Olympic taekwondo athlete	Eliminated 4th on 26 February 2017
Caprice	Model & actress	Withdrew on 27 February 2017
Gareth Thomas	Former Welsh rugby player	Withdrew on 7 March 2017
Emma Parker Bowles	Motoring correspondent	Eliminated 5th on 12 March 2017
Lydia Bright	The Only Way Is Essex star	Eliminated 6th on 12 March 2017
Kadeena Cox	Paralympic cyclist	Eliminated 7th on 12 March 2017
Amy Willerton	Miss Universe Great Britain 2013	Fourth place on 12 March 2017
Jason Robinson	Former England rugby captain	Third place on 12 March 2017
Louis Smith	Olympic artistic gymnast	Runner-up on 12 March 2017
Spencer Matthews	Made in Chelsea star	Winner on 12 March 2017

== Live shows ==
The live shows started on 5 February and will end on 12 March 2017.

=== Results summary ===
Colour key

–	Celebrity did not take part in this event
–	Celebrity recorded the slowest time/speed in that event and had to perform a live ski jump
–	Celebrity recorded the fastest time/speed in each event

Celebrity	Week 1	Week 2		Week 3	Week 4		Week 5			Week 6			Number of events
Celebrity	Week 1	Race 1	Race 2	Week 3	Race 1	Race 2	Event 1	Event 2		Event 1	Event 2	Final	Number of events
Celebrity	Week 1	Race 1	Race 2	Week 3	Race 1	Race 2	Event 1	Race 1	Race 2	Event 1	Event 2	Final	Number of events
Spencer	2nd	3rd	—N/a	5th 44.71	DNF	DNS	2nd 8.25	1st	1st	3rd	1st	Winner; 18.98m	8
Louis	1st	1st	—N/a	8th 45.43	1st	—N/a	1st 9.40	1st	1st	1st	1st	Runner-up; 18.05m	8
Jason	DNF	1st	—N/a	6th 45.20	1st	—N/a	3rd 8.04	2nd	2nd	2nd	2nd	3rd 16.35m	8
Amy	2nd	2nd	2nd	11th 48.67	3rd	—N/a	=5th 7.87	1st	2nd	6th	2nd	4th Foul	8
Kadeena	2nd	2nd	DNS	4th 44.60	2nd	2nd	8th 7.44	—N/a	—N/a	5th	3rd	Eliminated (Week 6)	7
Lydia	1st	1st	—N/a	7th 45.36	1st	—N/a	7th 7.64	—N/a	—N/a	4th	DNF	Re-Eliminated (Week 6)	7
Emma	2nd	3rd	—N/a	12th DNS	2nd	1st	=5th 7.87	2nd	—N/a	7th	Eliminated (Week 6)		7
Gareth	1st	2nd	1st	2nd 43.83	DNF	—N/a	4th 7.97	2nd	—N/a	Withdrew (Week 6)			6
Caprice	1st	3rd	—N/a	10th 48.58	—N/a	—N/a	Withdrew (Week 4)						3
Jade	1st	1st	—N/a	1st 43.73	3rd	—N/a	Eliminated (Week 4)						4
Bradley	1st	—N/a	—N/a	3rd 44.28	Withdrew (Week 4)								2
Robbie	1st	2nd	3rd	9th 46.46	Eliminated (Week 3)								3
Mark	2nd	3rd	—N/a	Eliminated (Week 2)									2
Josie	2nd	Eliminated (Week 1)											1
Live ski jump	Cox, Dolan, Gibson, Matthews, Parker Bowles, Robinson, Willerton	Caprice, Dolan, Fowler, Matthews, Parker Bowles, Willerton		Bright, Cox, Fowler, Parker Bowles, Smith, Willerton	Cox, Jones, Matthews, Thomas, Willerton		Bright, Cox, Parker Bowles, Robinson, Thomas, Willerton			Cox, Parker Bowles, Willerton	None		
Eliminated	Josie Gibson; Did not jump	Mark Dolan; 9.20m		Robbie Fowler; Foul	Jade Jones; 12.30m		Lydia Bright; 12.25m			Emma Parker Bowles; 14.10m	Lydia Bright; Lost event	Amy Willerton; Foul	
Eliminated	Josie Gibson; Did not jump	Mark Dolan; 9.20m		Robbie Fowler; Foul	Jade Jones; 12.30m		Lydia Bright; 12.25m			Emma Parker Bowles; 14.10m	Kadeena Cox; Lost event	Jason Robinson; 16.35m	
Eliminated	Josie Gibson; Did not jump	Mark Dolan; 9.20m		Robbie Fowler; Foul	Jade Jones; 12.30m		Lydia Bright; 12.25m			Emma Parker Bowles; 14.10m	Kadeena Cox; Lost event	Louis Smith; 18.05m	

=== Episode details ===
==== Week 1 (5 February) ====
- Event: Parallel slalom
- Location: Kühtai Saddle

Race	Celebrity	Place	Result
1	Louis Smith	1st	Safe
1	Spencer Matthews	2nd	Bottom seven
2	Kadeena Cox	2nd	Bottom seven
2	Robbie Fowler	1st	Safe
3	Amy Willerton	2nd	Bottom seven
3	Caprice	1st	Safe
4	Sir Bradley Wiggins	1st	Safe
4	Mark Dolan	2nd	Bottom seven
5	Gareth Thomas	1st	Safe
5	Jason Robinson	DNF	Bottom seven
6	Jade Jones	1st	Safe
6	Josie Gibson	2nd	Bottom seven
7	Emma Parker Bowles	2nd	Bottom seven
7	Lydia Bright	1st	Safe

Live ski jump details

Order	Celebrity	Distance (metres)	Result
1	Spencer Matthews	14.55	Safe
2	Kadeena Cox	13.80	Safe
3	Amy Willerton	12.83	Safe
4	Mark Dolan	10.45	Safe
5	Jason Robinson	14.95	Safe
6	Josie Gibson	—N/a	Eliminated
7	Emma Parker Bowles	11.00	Safe

==== Week 2 (12 February) ====
- Event: Snow cross
- Location: Kühtai Saddle

Race	Celebrity	Place	Result
1	Jason Robinson	1st	Safe
1	Gareth Thomas	2nd	In Race 5
1	Spencer Matthews	3rd	Bottom six
2	Lydia Bright	1st	Safe
2	Kadeena Cox	2nd	In Race 5
2	Emma Parker Bowles	3rd	Bottom six
3	Louis Smith	1st	Safe
3	Robbie Fowler	2nd	In Race 5
3	Mark Dolan	3rd	Bottom six
3	Sir Bradley Wiggins	DNS	Given bye
4	Jade Jones	1st	Safe
4	Amy Willerton	2nd	In Race 5
4	Caprice	3rd	Bottom six
5	Gareth Thomas	1st	Safe
5	Amy Willerton	2nd	Bottom six
5	Robbie Fowler	3rd	Bottom six
5	Kadeena Cox	DNS	Given bye

Live ski jump details

Order	Celebrity	Distance (metres)	Result
1	Spencer Matthews	14.75	Safe
2	Emma Parker Bowles	10.55	Safe
3	Mark Dolan	9.20	Eliminated
4	Caprice	11.58	Safe
5	Robbie Fowler	13.00	Safe
6	Amy Willerton	11.43	Safe

==== Week 3 (19 February) ====
- Event: Skeleton
- Location: Igls Sliding Centre

Race	Celebrity	Time (seconds)	Overall leaderboard	Result
1	Sir Bradley Wiggins	44.28	3rd	Safe
1	Louis Smith	45.43	8th	Bottom six
2	Spencer Matthews	44.71	5th	Safe
2	Amy Willerton	48.67	11th	Bottom six
3	Jason Robinson	45.20	6th	Safe
3	Robbie Fowler	46.46	9th	Bottom six
4	Lydia Bright	45.36	7th	Bottom six
4	Gareth Thomas	43.83	2nd	Safe
5	Caprice	48.58	10th	Safe
5	Emma Parker Bowles	DNS	12th	Bottom six
6	Kadeena Cox	44.60	4th	Bottom six
6	Jade Jones	43.73	1st	Safe

Live ski jump details

Order	Celebrity	Distance (metres)	Result
1	Louis Smith	16.58	Safe
2	Amy Willerton	13.10	Safe
3	Robbie Fowler	Foul	Eliminated
4	Emma Parker Bowles	10.93	Safe
5	Lydia Bright	11.50	Safe
6	Kadeena Cox	13.48	Safe

==== Week 4 (26 February) ====
- Event: Ski cross
- Location: Kühtai Saddle

Race	Celebrity	Leaderboard	Result
1	Louis Smith	1st	Safe
1	Spencer Matthews	DNF	In Race 4
1	Gareth Thomas	DNF	Bottom five
2	Jason Robinson	1st	Safe
2	Emma Parker Bowles	2nd	In Race 4
2	Amy Willerton	3rd	Bottom five
3	Lydia Bright	1st	Safe
3	Kadeena Cox	2nd	In Race 4
3	Jade Jones	3rd	Bottom five
4	Emma Parker Bowles	1st	Safe
4	Kadeena Cox	2nd	Bottom five
4	Spencer Matthews	DNS	Bottom five

Live ski jump details

Order	Celebrity	Distance (metres)	Result
1	Gareth Thomas	15.70	Safe
2	Amy Willerton	14.15	Safe
3	Jade Jones	12.30	Eliminated
4	Spencer Matthews	15.13	Safe
5	Kadeena Cox	13.90	Safe

==== Week 5: Semi-final (5 March) ====
- Event: Air jump
- Location: Kühtai Saddle

Order	Celebrity	Height (metres)	Overall leaderboard	Result
1	Jason Robinson	8.04	3rd	Through to giant slalom
2	Emma Parker Bowles	7.87	=5th	Through to giant slalom
3	Spencer Matthews	8.25	2nd	Through to giant slalom
4	Lydia Bright	7.64	7th	Bottom six
5	Gareth Thomas	7.97	4th	Through to giant slalom
6	Kadeena Cox	7.44	8th	Bottom six
7	Louis Smith	9.40	1st	Through to giant slalom
8	Amy Willerton	7.87	=5th	Through to giant slalom

- Event: Giant slalom

Race	Celebrity	Leaderboard	Result
1	Spencer Matthews	1st	In Race 4
1	Gareth Thomas	2nd	Bottom six
2	Amy Willerton	1st	In Race 5
2	Emma Parker Bowles	2nd	Bottom six
3	Louis Smith	1st	In Race 5
3	Jason Robinson	2nd	In Race 4
4	Spencer Matthews	1st	Safe
4	Jason Robinson	2nd	Bottom six
5	Louis Smith	1st	Safe
5	Amy Willerton	2nd	Bottom six

Live ski jump details

Order	Celebrity	Distance (metres)	Result
1	Kadeena Cox	14.65	Safe
2	Lydia Bright	12.25	Eliminated
3	Emma Parker Bowles	12.25	Safe
4	Gareth Thomas	14.58	Safe
5	Jason Robinson	15.18	Safe
6	Amy Willerton	13.70	Safe

==== Week 6: Final (12 March) ====
- Event: Snow cross
- Location: Kühtai Saddle

Race	Celebrity	Leaderboard	Result
1	Louis Smith	1st	Safe
1	Jason Robinson	2nd	Safe
1	Spencer Matthews	3rd	Safe
1	Lydia Bright	4th	Safe
1	Kadeena Cox	5th	Bottom three
1	Amy Willerton	6th	Bottom three
1	Emma Parker Bowles	7th	Bottom three

Live ski jump details (Round 1)

Order	Celebrity	Distance (metres)	Result
1	Amy Willerton	16.08	Safe
2	Emma Parker Bowles	14.10	Eliminated
3	Kadeena Cox	15.38	Safe

Event: Ski cross

Race	Celebrity	Leaderboard	Result
1	Louis Smith	1st	Safe
1	Jason Robinson	2nd	Safe
1	Lydia Bright	DNF	Eliminated
2	Spencer Matthews	1st	Safe
2	Amy Willerton	2nd	Safe
2	Kadeena Cox	3rd	Eliminated

Live ski jump details (Round 2)

Order	Celebrity	Distance (metres)	Result
1	Jason Robinson	16.35	Third place
2	Louis Smith	18.05	Runner-up
3	Amy Willerton	Foul	Fourth place
4	Spencer Matthews	18.98	Winner

== Ratings ==
Official ratings are taken from BARB, and include Channel 4+1.

Episode	Air date	UK viewers (millions)	C4 weekly rank
1	5 February	2.83	1
2	12 February	2.41	1
3	19 February	2.30	3
4	26 February	1.78	7
5	5 March	1.78	10
6	12 March	1.88	9
