= Micky Flanagan =

English comedian (born 1962)

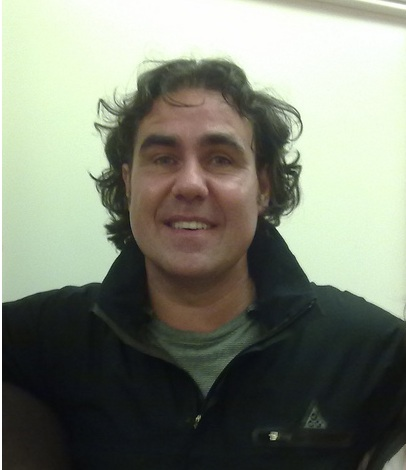
- Flanagan in 2010
- Born: Michael John Flanagan; 7 October 1962 (age 63); Whitechapel, London, England

Comedy career
- Years active: 1997–present
- Medium: Television, radio, stand-up
- Website: mickyflanagan.com

Michael John Flanagan (born 7 October 1962) is an English comedian. Flanagan has performed at the Edinburgh Fringe and toured Britain with stand-up shows. He presented Micky Flanagan: What Chance Change? for Radio 4 and has appeared on various TV shows including Mock the Week, A League of Their Own, 8 Out of 10 Cats, Was It Something I Said?, Michael McIntyre's Comedy Roadshow and I Love My Country.

== Early life and career ==
Flanagan was born on 7 October 1962 in Whitechapel, East London, and grew up in Bethnal Green. His father, Jim, who worked as a welder and latterly as a fish porter, came from County Donegal in Ulster, the northern province in Ireland. His father was involved in petty crime, and served a short prison sentence as a result.

Flanagan was a sensitive and thoughtful child, and keen to leave the East End of London. At the age of thirteen, he joined the Young Socialists. Flanagan was a bright student, but became disengaged with schoolwork, and began to truant. He left school at the age of fifteen with no qualifications.

Through his father, he got his first job as a fish porter at Billingsgate Fish Market. In 1981, he spent the summer on Fire Island, New York, where he worked as a kitchen porter.

Flanagan returned to London and worked as a furniture maker for several years. His business failed and he returned to Fire Island for another summer.

He resumed education at the age of 25, beginning with a GCSE in English and going on to a foundation course in Arts and Social Sciences and a degree at City University, which he began aged 29.

Flanagan went on to train as a teacher by taking the Postgraduate Certificate in Education, but decided not to pursue teaching as a career, later describing the experience as "the unhappiest year of my life ... everything that was wrong about the school system when I was young was still the same".

== Comedy career ==
Flanagan became a professional comedian in 1997 after attending a comedy course at Jacksons Lane, north London, in 1996.

In 2001, he performed in the Big Value Comedy Show at the Edinburgh Fringe as one of four headline acts, and in 2003 co-headlined a show with Nina Conti. In January 2003 he was performing at Balham's Banana Cabaret, alongside Jimmy Carr, and The Bearcat Comedy Club, alongside Stephen K. Amos.

He performed his first full-length solo show, What Chance Change? in 2006, and in 2007 was nominated for Best Newcomer at the Edinburgh Comedy Awards. He toured Great Britain with The Out Out Tour in 2010/2011.

Flanagan was a regular performer on Out to Lunch on Radio 2 in 2008, and appeared on Michael McIntyre's Comedy Roadshow in 2009. In 2010 he presented a four-part series for Radio 4 entitled Micky Flanagan: What Chance Change?, and performed on Live at the Apollo, Stand Up for the Week and the Royal Variety Performance. He appeared on Mock the Week in 2010 and made further appearances in 2011. He was a panellist on the BBC1 game show Epic Win, which was broadcast in August and September 2011.

In 2009, Flanagan's agent lodged a complaint with the Advertising Standards Authority claiming that a television commercial for directory enquiries service 118 118 was using his "out out" catchphrase and skit. The skit, performed on Michael McIntyre's Comedy Roadshow, is based on the idea that people have different levels of going out, with "out out" referring to a big night out. The commercial featured an animated character using the phrase in a nightclub setting. The ASA acknowledged the similarity but said it was beyond its remit to take action.

In 2011, he signed a deal with Ebury Publishing to write his autobiography. He appeared in a celebrity version of The Chase, hosted by Bradley Walsh.

In 2012, Flanagan starred alongside Mark Watson and host Mark Dolan as a captain on the Channel 4 advertising-based comedy panel programme The Mad Bad Ad Show. On 7 June 2013, he appeared on The Graham Norton Show alongside Dan Stevens, Hayden Panettiere, Robin Thicke and Pharrell Williams. He was a team captain, alongside Frank Skinner on the BBC One comedy series I Love My Country, which is hosted by Gabby Logan. Additionally, he was a team captain on Channel 4 comedy panel show Was It Something I Said?.

In 2015, he took a year's sabbatical, citing work-related stress and a need to relax.

== Personal life ==
Flanagan and his wife, Cathy, have one son.

He retains a London base in East Dulwich but lives primarily in the Hampshire countryside.

== Stand-up tours ==
Year	Title	DVD Release	Filming Location	Tour Dates
2010–2011	Live: The Out Out Tour	14 November 2011	Live at Southend's Cliffs Pavilion	82 dates
2013	Back in the Game Live	18 November 2013	Live at London's Hackney Empire	58 dates
2017	An' Another Fing Live	20 November 2017	Live at London's O2 Arena	43 dates
2023–2024	If Ever We Needed It...	17 November 2025	Live at Cardiff International Arena	
