= Laura Hamilton =

English television presenter and property expert (born 1982)

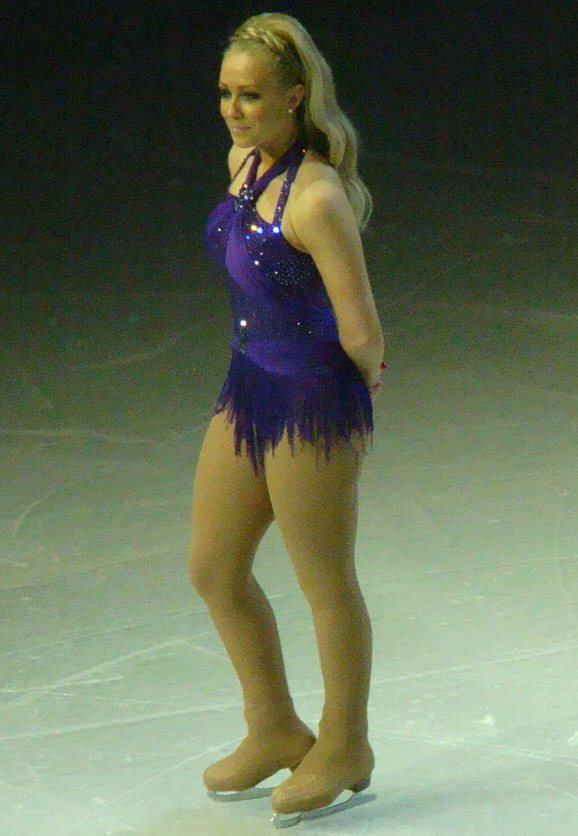
- Hamilton on the Dancing on Ice tour in 2011
- Born: Laura Jane Hamilton; 24 April 1982 (age 44); Kent, England
- Education: Westwood Technology College Dartford Grammar School for Girls
- Occupations: Television presenter, property & travel expert & entrepreneur
- Years active: 2004–present
- Television: Fun Song Factory; Toonattik; Fort Boyard: Ultimate Challenge; A Place in the Sun
- Height: 5 ft 2 in (1. 57 m)
- Children: 2
- Website: laurahamilton.co.uk

Laura Jane Hamilton (born 24 April 1982) is an English television presenter, property expert and entrepreneur. She began her career on children's television, presenting shows such as Fun Song Factory and on Nickelodeon. She participated in series six of Dancing on Ice in 2011, finishing in second place.

Since February 2012, Hamilton has been a presenter of Channel 4's A Place in the Sun and also co-presented Cowboy Builders & Bodge Jobs for Channel 5 in 2015. In 2022, she joined ITV1's This Morning presenting Live features on location.

== Early life and early career ==
Hamilton grew up in Dartford, Kent. After gaining A-Levels at Dartford Grammar School for Girls, she turned down an offer to study law and psychology at university for a one-year contract at Channel 4 television, as a runner for Dermot O'Leary. She left Channel 4 after her contract ended and worked as an Assistant Floor Manager on productions including Top of the Pops, The Buckingham Palace Jubilee Celebrations, The Games, T4, Party in the Park, Robbie Williams at Knebworth and Big Brother. She then went on to work as a 2nd/3rd Assistant Director on TV shows including Family Affairs, The Bill, and films including Harry Potter and Stardust. She worked behind the camera for four years in assistant roles before making her on-screen TV debut.

She has also worked for production companies and broadcasters including ITV, Channel 5, Nickelodeon, Cartoon Network, Boomerang and Disney XD.

== Television and film career ==
Her first break in front of the camera came as 'Melody' in the popular pre-school show Fun Song Factory for CITV, which she played for two and a half years until the show ended in 2004. She had appeared alongside Aston Merrygold from JLS on Fun Song Factory. She also appeared in the films Dead Man's Cards in 2006 and Magicians in 2007. She was also the face of Citibank for their European campaign.

In 2006, Hamilton became the female face of kids' TV channel Nickelodeon, and presented Nickheads, Slime Across the UK in summer 2007, and ME:TV (LIVE) for the channel. She also presented the Nickelodeon UK Kids' Choice Awards, with McFly in 2007, and Dannii Minogue in 2008.

In March 2008, Hamilton started guest presenting on GMTV's Toonattik. She was involved in the Endemol-produced The Bratz Design Academy in late 2008 where children got to become fashion designers and design a dress that she wore to an awards ceremony. In 2009, Hamilton co-hosted the UK version of Staraoke on Boomerang with Nigel Clarke.

On 18 December 2010, Hamilton was revealed as one of the 16 celebrities to participate in ITV1's flagship show, Dancing on Ice in 2011.

In early 2011, amongst a few others, she was in discussions with Simon Cowell to present The Xtra Factor that year. She decided to quit her job with Nickelodeon to move away from children's television.

On 4 October 2011, Hamilton appeared on the Channel 5 show Real Food Family Cook Off as a guest judge alongside chef Ainsley Harriott. On 17 February 2012, Hamilton appeared in Series 11 of The Real Hustle, as a participant.

On 24 March 2012, Hamilton appeared on Winter Wipeout's first celebrity special. She failed to progress to the "Wipeout Zone" final, after being eliminated in 4th place at the 'Winter Blunderland' stage. On 13 December 2012, Hamilton appeared on Celebrity Eggheads alongside Alistair Appleton, Simon O'Brien, Ed Hall and Angus Purden in the "house and home experts" team.

Her show Beat My Build aired on Channel 4 in November 2013. In 2014, she participated in the first series of The Jump and left the competition on day 5, after narrowly losing the ski jump-off against Donal MacIntyre.

=== Recent work ===
Hamilton presented the revived series of Fort Boyard for CITV, now called Fort Boyard: Ultimate Challenge, which also aired on Disney XD in the USA. She co-hosted alongside American actor, Geno Segers in series 1 & 2 and former Blue Peter presenter, Andy Akinwolere from series 3 to 5. The show was not renewed for a 6th series in 2015.

On 24 August 2011, it was announced in Hello Magazine that Hamilton would be joining the team of Channel 4's award-winning show, A Place in the Sun. Her first episode aired on 6 February 2012.

Laura presents outside feature broadcasts and viewer competitions including for ITV's This Morning. Hamilton regularly writes for A Place in the Sun magazine and also reviews hotels for national publications.

== Dancing on Ice ==
Hamilton took part and came second place in the 2011 series of popular ITV show Dancing on Ice with Canadian professional Colin Ratushniak. They were top of the leaderboard four times during the competition; Qualifier 1 with a score of 19.5 out of 30, week 4 with a score of 25.5 out of 30, week 5 with a score of 25.5 out of 30 and week 7 with a score of 28.5 out of 30/57.0 out of 60.

In week 7 of the competition, Hamilton captained a team in the 'team challenge'. The judges decided her group's performance was the better of the two and thus, every skater in her team had their points doubled, therefore Hamilton and Ratushniak's score for that week was 57.0 out of a possible 60.

They were only the fourth couple in Dancing on Ice history to achieve a perfect score of 30.0 out of 30.0 when they performed their favourite routine to "I'm So Excited" in the Final. They came second place overall. She also took part in Dancing on Ice: The Tour 2011 along with Ratushniak.

=== Performances and results ===
Dancing on Ice performances and results (2011)
Week	Song	Artist	Score	Leaderboard
Qualifier 1	"My Life Would Suck Without You"	Kelly Clarkson	16	1st (Skate-off)
1	"All the Lovers"	Kylie Minogue	19.5	=2nd
2	"Whenever, Wherever"	Shakira	20	2nd
3	"It's All Coming Back to Me Now"	Celine Dion	24	2nd
4	"You Can't Stop the Beat"	Cast of Hairspray	25.5	1st
5	"Stop!"	Sam Brown	25.5	1st
6	"Upside Down"	Paloma Faith	24.5	=2nd (Skate-off)
7	"I'm So Excited"	Pointer Sisters	28.5	1st
Team Challenge	"Rockin' All Over the World"	Status Quo	57	1st
8	"Rolling in the Deep"	The Overtones	25.5	2nd
Semi-final	"The Last Dance"	Clare Maguire	28.0	2nd
Semi-final	"These Boots Are Made for Walkin'"	Jessica Simpson	26.5	2nd
Final	"Express Yourself"	Madonna	26	Runner-up
Final	"I'm So Excited"	Pointer Sisters	30	Runner-up
Final	Boléro	Ravel	—N/a	Runner-up

== Charity work ==
Hamilton is an ambassador for the charities WellChild and the Children's Trust, Tadworth.

== Personal life ==
Hamilton lives in Surrey with her children.

In 2017, she rescued her local village shop in Purley and created 'Lord Roberts on The Green'. She sold it four years later.
