= Pellow =

Pellow, also spelt Pellowe, is both a surname and given name. It is particularly associated with Cornwall.

== Surname ==
People with the surname include:

- Craig Pellowe, English former gymnast
- David Naguib Pellow (born 1969), American sociologist
- David Pellowe, founder of Church and State, an Australian conservative Christian lobby group, in 2016
- Dick Pellow (1931-2019), American businessman and politician
- J. D. C. Pellow (1890-1960), English poet
- John Pellow Pellowe and Thomas Pellowe, mayor of Penzance in the 18th century
- Kit Pellow (born 1973), American baseball player
- Marti Pellow (born 1965), Scottish singer
- Nicola Pellow, English mathematician and information scientist
- Thomas Pellow (1704-1745), Cornish author who wrote about his years of slavery in the Sultanate of Morocco

== Given name ==
People with the given name include:

- Pellow van der Westhuizen (born 1984), South African rugby union footballer
