= The Jump (2014 TV series) =

British reality television series

- Genre: Reality; Sports
- Presented by: Davina McCall (series 1–4); Alex Brooker (series 1)
- Starring: Graham Bell; Amy Williams; Eddie "The Eagle" Edwards; Jenny Jones; Lizzy Yarnold
- Composer: David Lowe
- Country of origin: United Kingdom
- Original language: English
- No. of series: 4
- No. of episodes: 25

Production
- Executive producers: Melanie Leach; Andrew Mackenzie; Rachel Watson; Tony Moulsdale; Abigail Adams; Caroline Davies
- Production location: Various locations in Austria
- Running time: 60–80 minutes (inc. adverts)
- Production companies: Twofour and Motion Content Group

Original release
- Network: Channel 4
- Release: 26 January 2014 – 12 March 2017

Related
- The Games; Famous and Fearless; Splash!

The Jump is a British television series that followed celebrities as they tried to master various winter sports including skeleton, bobsleigh, snowskates, ski cross, and giant slalom. Davina McCall and Alex Brooker presented the first series, with McCall returning for future series. Brooker did not return for future series, however. Winter Olympic skier Graham Bell and skeleton gold medallist Amy Williams put the celebrities through training in the UK and Austria. Britain's first Olympic ski jumper, Eddie "The Eagle" Edwards, appears live on the show to demonstrate the ski jump.

The first series was won by singer Joe McElderry on 3 February 2014. In March 2014, Channel 4's chief creative officer, Jay Hunt, said she was keen to renew the show for a second series. On 1 September 2014, Channel 4 confirmed that it had renewed the show for a second series in 2015. The second series was won by reality television star Joey Essex.

On 28 April 2015, Channel 4 renewed the show for a third series that began on 31 January 2016. The third series concluded on 6 March 2016 with retired rugby union player Ben Cohen winning the series; despite this, the series suffered controversy due to it containing the highest amount of injuries/withdrawals out of all the four series. Despite reports that the show would be cancelled after the third series due to low ratings and poor views, on 13 July 2016 it was confirmed that the show would be once again renewed for a fourth series, that started on 5 February 2017 and ended 12 March with Spencer Matthews winning.

In July 2017 Channel 4 announced that the show was to be temporarily rested and would not be returning in 2018, it was expected to return for a fifth series in early 2019. However, this never happened and in December 2018 Channel 4 confirmed via Twitter that the show had been cancelled and would not be returning.

== Format ==
The show was broadcast live on public service broadcaster Channel 4, from Innsbruck and Kühtai in Austria. Each night, the two celebrities that record the slowest time or speed in each event face a live ski jump to keep their place in the competition. The events take place in different locations in Austria and are pre-recorded, so the celebrities do not know their times when they complete the event.

The show's working title was The Alpine Games. It was initially taken to ITV in 2012, but was declined after it was deemed "too dangerous" by chiefs.

=== On the Piste ===
On 20 January 2015, it was announced that a new spin-off show would air on sister channel E4. The show, called The Jump: On the Piste is hosted by Cherry Healey and features interviews with the celebrities as well as unseen footage and special guests. The show did not return for the future series.

== Main series results ==
To date, four series have been broadcast as summarised below;

| Series | Start date | End date | Episodes | Winner | Runner-up | Third place | Hosts | Mentors |
|---|---|---|---|---|---|---|---|---|
| 1 | 26 January 2014 | 3 February 2014 | 8 | Joe McElderry | Donal MacIntyre | —N/a | Davina McCall; Alex Brooker | Graham Bell; Amy Williams; Eddie "The Eagle" Edwards |
| 2 | 1 February 2015 | 9 February 2015 | 9 | Joey Essex | Mike Tindall | Louise Hazel | Davina McCall | Graham Bell; Amy Williams; Eddie "The Eagle" Edwards; Jenny Jones |
| 3 | 31 January 2016 | 6 March 2016 | 6 | Ben Cohen | Dean Cain | Tom Parker | Davina McCall | Graham Bell; Eddie "The Eagle" Edwards; Lizzy Yarnold |
| 4 | 5 February 2017 | 12 March 2017 | 6 | Spencer Matthews | Louis Smith | Jason Robinson | Davina McCall | Graham Bell |

=== Series 1 (2014) ===
The twelve original celebrities taking part were revealed on 11 December 2013.

Two of the original line-up withdrew from the show before it began. It was announced on 13 January 2014 that socialite Tara Palmer-Tomkinson had quit the show and been replaced by Laura Hamilton, and actor Sam J. Jones withdrew the following day due to a shoulder injury. He was replaced by singer Ritchie Neville.

Singer Joe McElderry and presenter Donal MacIntyre also trained as alternates in case somebody else pulled out. Conway withdrew due to a hand injury, which led to McElderry joining the competition on 28 January (Day 3) after a live ski jump-off against MacIntyre, which he won. However, the following day, MacIntyre joined as replacement for Messenger, who was forced to withdraw due to concussion. On 3 February 2014, prior to the evening's final, Redgrave and Brigstocke withdrew from the competition due to injuries he suffered during training.

The series began airing on 26 January 2014 for eight nights (except 1 February) until the final on 3 February 2014. During the live ski jump, the celebrities are given the option of three jumps – K15 (small), K24 (medium) or K40 (largest). The celebrity that jumps the shortest distance is eliminated. From Day 5 onwards, the K15 jump was removed from the competition.

| Celebrity | Known for | Status |
|---|---|---|
| Nicky Clarke | Celebrity hairdresser | Eliminated 1st |
| Amy Childs | The Only Way Is Essex star | Eliminated 2nd |
| Henry Conway | Socialite, party promoter & fashion journalist | Withdrew |
| Darren Gough | Former England cricketer | Eliminated 3rd |
| Melinda Messenger | Television presenter & former glamour model | Withdrew |
| Sinitta | Singer & The X Factor mentor | Eliminated 4th |
| Laura Hamilton | Television presenter and property expert since (2012–) | Eliminated 5th |
| Kimberly Wyatt | Former The Pussycat Dolls singer | Eliminated 6th |
| Anthea Turner | Television presenter | Eliminated 7th |
| Ritchie Neville | Five singer | Eliminated 8th |
| Sir Steve Redgrave | Former Olympic rower | Withdrew |
| Marcus Brigstocke | Satire comedian & actor | Withdrew |
| Donal MacIntyre | Investigative journalist | Runner-up |
| Joe McElderry | The X Factor 2009 winner | Winner |

=== Series 2 (2015) ===
The sixteen original celebrities taking part were revealed on 10 December 2014. On 13 December 2014, Ola Jordan had to pull out of the competition due to injury. She was replaced by Chloe Madeley. On 9 January, Sally Bercow had to pull out of the competition due to injury and was replaced by Jodie Kidd.

| Celebrity | Known for | Status |
|---|---|---|
| Phil Tufnell | Former England cricketer | Eliminated 1st |
| Dominic Parker | Gogglebox star | Eliminated 2nd |
| Heather Mills | Businesswoman & animal rights activist | Eliminated 3rd |
| Ashley Roberts | Former The Pussycat Dolls singer | Eliminated 4th |
| Louie Spence | Choreographer & Pineapple Dance Studios star | Eliminated 5th |
| Jodie Kidd | Fashion model | Eliminated 6th |
| Stacey Solomon | The X Factor contestant & television presenter | Eliminated 7th |
| Lady Victoria Hervey | Model & socialite | Eliminated 8th |
| Steve-O | Jackass star | Eliminated 9th |
| JB Gill | Former JLS singer | Eliminated 10th |
| Jon-Allan Butterworth | Paralympic track cyclist | Eliminated 11th |
| Chloe Madeley | Freelance journalist & model | Eliminated 12th |
| Louise Thompson | Made in Chelsea star | Eliminated 13th |
| Louise Hazel | Olympic heptathlete | Third place |
| Mike Tindall | Former England rugby player | Runner-up |
| Joey Essex | The Only Way Is Essex star | Winner |

=== Series 3 (2016) ===
The third series of The Jump began airing on 31 January 2016 on Channel 4. in a weekly, instead of usual nightly format. Twelve celebrity competitors took part in this series with the full line up being confirmed on 16 January 2016. Tom Parker and Gemma Merna were confirmed as standby competitors in case of injury. On 4 February, Tina Hobley was forced to withdraw from the competition after dislocating her elbow and was replaced by Parker. On 8 February, it was announced that Linford Christie could be forced to withdraw as well due to a hamstring injury. The following day, it was announced that Mark-Francis Vandelli was forced to withdraw after fracturing his ankle. On 11 February, it was confirmed that Christie would also leave the competition with previously eliminated contestant James Argent as his replacement.

| Celebrity | Known for | Status |
|---|---|---|
| Louisa Lytton | EastEnders actress | Eliminated 1st |
| Tina Hobley | Holby City actress | Withdrew |
| Rebecca Adlington | Olympic freestyle swimmer | Withdrew |
| Beth Tweddle | Olympic artistic gymnast | Withdrew |
| Mark-Francis Vandelli | Made in Chelsea star | Withdrew |
| Linford Christie | Olympic sprinter | Withdrew |
| James "Arg" Argent | The Only Way Is Essex star | Eliminated 2nd |
| Joe Swash | EastEnders actor & television presenter | Eliminated 3rd |
| Sarah Harding | Girls Aloud singer & actress | Withdrew |
| Heather Mills | Businesswoman & animal rights activist | Withdrew |
| Brian McFadden | Westlife singer & television presenter | Eliminated 4th |
| Tamara Beckwith | Socialite | Eliminated 5th |
| Sid Owen | EastEnders actor & singer | Eliminated 6th |
| Tom Parker | The Wanted singer | Third place |
| Dean Cain | The New Adventures of Superman actor | Runner-up |
| Ben Cohen | Former England rugby player | Winner |

=== Series 4 (2017) ===
The fourth and final series of The Jump began on 5 February 2017 on Channel 4, and was shown over six weeks. The first five celebrity contestants taking part in the series were announced on 16 November 2016. On 2 December 2016, reality TV star Lydia Bright was the sixth contestant revealed. On 11 December, Josie Gibson was the next celebrity to be revealed. The full line-up was confirmed by Channel 4 on 3 January 2017. It was confirmed on 2 February 2017 that model and DJ Vogue Williams had to pull out of the show due to a knee injury; she was replaced by Amy Willerton.

| Celebrity | Known for | Status |
|---|---|---|
| Josie Gibson | Big Brother 11 winner | Eliminated 1st |
| Mark Dolan | Comedian & television presenter | Eliminated 2nd |
| Robbie Fowler | Former England footballer | Eliminated 3rd |
| Sir Bradley Wiggins | Cycling legend | Withdrew |
| Jade Jones | Olympic taekwondo athlete | Eliminated 4th |
| Caprice Bourret | Model and businesswoman | Withdrew |
| Gareth Thomas | Former Welsh rugby player | Withdrew |
| Emma Parker Bowles | Motoring correspondent | Eliminated 5th |
| Lydia Bright | The Only Way Is Essex star | Eliminated 6th |
| Kadeena Cox | Paralympic athlete and cyclist | Eliminated 7th |
| Amy Willerton | Miss Universe Great Britain 2013 | Eliminated 8th |
| Jason Robinson | Former England rugby captain | Third place |
| Louis Smith | Olympic artistic gymnast | Runner-up |
| Spencer Matthews | Made in Chelsea star | Winner |

== Reception ==
=== Critical reception ===
The Jump received negative reviews from viewers and critics alike. Sally Newall of The Independent called it "a bonkers, scary mash-up of Big Brother and Ski Sunday", whilst Alex Fletcher of Digital Spy said "It was more painful than a snowball in the mouth." In a one-star review, The Daily Telegraph's Michael Hogan said that "We were promised celebrities risking life and limb on The Jump. What we actually got was publicity-seeking C-listers plopping off a ski jump so small that it could double as a speed bump or playground slide. It all put the anti-climactic icing on a deeply disappointing cake." Jonathan Whiley said that, "This is reality TV taken to its limits; manufactured, emotionless crap wheeled out through desperation. I'm usually all for that mind, providing it throws up entertainment which this, sadly, lacks from start to finish."

During series 3, several viewers demanded that the show be cancelled following the reported injuries of three castmembers in just the first two weeks of filming. Tina Hobley suffered a dislocated elbow on 4 February. She was released, but left the competition. On 7 February, it was announced that Rebecca Adlington would leave the show following a dislocated shoulder and Beth Tweddle would also leave the show following a back injury. Similarly, Tom Parker tore ligaments in his hand.

=== Ratings ===
Official ratings are taken from BARB, but do not include Channel 4 +1.

| Series | Start date | | End date | | Series average (millions) |
| Series | Air date | Official rating (millions) | Air date | Official rating (millions) | Series average (millions) |
|---|---|---|---|---|---|
| 1 | 26 January 2014 | 2.62 | 3 February 2014 | 1.89 | 2.16 |
| 2 | 1 February 2015 | 2.85 | 9 February 2015 | 2.06 | 2.13 |
| 3 | 31 January 2016 | 2.41 | 6 March 2016 | 1.87 | 2.05 |
| 4 | 5 February 2017 | 2.83 | 12 March 2017 | 1.88 | 2.16 |
