= The Mad Bad Ad Show =

2012 British comedy panel show

- Genre: Comedy panel game
- Written by: Tim Allsop; Matthew Crosby; Gary Delaney; Alistair Griggs; Stewart Williams; Giles Boden; Aiden Spackman
- Directed by: Richard Valentine; Andrew Chaplin; Lucy Forbes; Geraldine Dowd
- Presented by: Mark Dolan
- Starring: Micky Flanagan; Mark Watson
- Voices of: Simon Greenall
- Country of origin: United Kingdom
- Original language: English
- No. of series: 1
- No. of episodes: 6 (list of episodes)

Production
- Executive producers: Lee Hupfield; Paul Gilheany; Andrew Newman
- Producer: Laura Clark
- Production location: BBC Television Centre
- Editors: Stuart Lutes; Philip Lepherd; Diane Bernhardt; Sasha Thuillier
- Running time: 50 minutes (inc. adverts)
- Production company: Objective Productions

Original release
- Network: Channel 4
- Release: 17 February – 13 April 2012

The Mad Bad Ad Show is a British comedy panel show made by Objective Productions and hosted by Mark Dolan. It aired for one series on Channel 4 in 2012.

== Format ==
The premise of the show is based around answering questions about and related to advertisements, with the two team captains, Mark Watson and Micky Flanagan, each also making an advertisement of their own for a fictitious product which they also have to invent.

The programme consists of two teams, each featuring, alongside the captains, one other comedian and one advertising professional.

== Episode list ==
The coloured backgrounds denote the result of each of the shows:

– Indicates Micky's team won
– Indicates Mark's team won

No.	First broadcast	Micky's team	Mark's team	Score	Winner
1	17 February 2012	Simon Chamberlain; Holly Walsh	Kate Stanners; Joe Wilkinson	8–2	Mark's team
2	24 February 2012	Matthew Crosby; Nils Leonard	Jason Manford; Kate Stanners	9–3	Mark's team
3	2 March 2012	Victor van Amerongen; Miles Jupp	Sean Lock; Gail Parminter	8–2	Mark's team
4	30 March 2012	Lorraine Kelly; Rory Sutherland	Peter Sells; Josh Widdicombe	9–4	Micky's team
5	6 April 2012	Rosie Arnold; Rufus Hound	Richard Exon; Sara Pascoe	9–4	Mark's team
6	13 April 2012	Rachel Riley; Rory Sutherland	Richard Exon; Chris Ramsey	8–6	Micky's team
