= The Door (TV series) =

- Genre: Reality television
- Presented by: Amanda Holden; Chris Tarrant
- Country of origin: United Kingdom
- Original language: English
- No. of series: 1
- No. of episodes: 2

Production
- Production location: The Maidstone Studios
- Running time: 2 x 60 minutes (including commercials)
- Production company: ITV Studios

Original release
- Network: ITV
- Release: 2 April – 3 April 2010

Related
- I'm a Celebrity... Get Me Out of Here!

The Door is a two-part celebrity series broadcast on the ITV Network in the United Kingdom, hosted by Amanda Holden (Wild at Heart) and Chris Tarrant (Who Wants to Be a Millionaire?).

Keith Duffy and Dean Gaffney made it to the final with Duffy winning the show with Gaffney as the runner-up.

== Overview ==
Six celebrities pass through a series of doors and take on a number of tough challenges. The last star standing claims a cash prize for their chosen charity. The show has been compared to classic TV show The Crystal Maze.

== Celebrities ==
Celebrity	Known for	Status
Frankie Sandford	The Saturdays singer	Eliminated 1st on 2 April 2010
Louisa Lytton	Former EastEnders actress	Eliminated 2nd on 2 April 2010
Jennie McAlpine	Coronation Street actress	Eliminated 3rd on 3 April 2010
Michael Underwood	Television presenter	Eliminated 4th on 3 April 2010
Dean Gaffney	Former EastEnders actor	Runner-up on 3 April 2010
Keith Duffy	Boyzone singer	Winner on 3 April 2010

== Broadcast and reception ==
The series average, based on overnight ratings was 3.545m, equating to a 15.15% viewing share.

	Date	Overnight rating (millions)	Share	Official rating (millions)	Weekly rank	Source
Episode 1	2 April 2010	3.59	14.4%	3.98	18th	
Episode 2	3 April 2010	3.50	15.9%	3.97	19th	
