= James Argent =

English television personality

- Born: James David Thomas Luke Argent; 5 December 1987 (age 38); Waltham Forest, London England
- Education: Trinity Catholic High School
- Occupations: Television personality, singer
- Years active: 2010–present
- Partners: Lydia Bright (2007–2012, 2015–2016); Gemma Collins (2012, 2017–2020); Nicoline Artursson

James David Thomas Luke Argent (born 5 December 1987) is an English television personality. From 2010 to 2018, he was a regular cast member on the ITVBe reality series The Only Way Is Essex. He has appeared in various other reality series, such as Sugar Free Farm and The Jump, and in 2019, he presented the entertainment segment on Good Morning Britain.

== Career ==
From 2010 to 2018, Argent was a cast member of the ITVBe reality series The Only Way Is Essex. In 2013, Argent participated in the first series of the Channel 5 reality series Celebrity Super Spa. In July 2015, it was announced that Argent would make his first pantomime appearance in a production of Cinderella at the Kings Theatre, Southsea. He was cast as Dandini. The production ran from December 2015 until January 2016. In 2016, he took part in the ITV's Sugar Free Farm and Channel 4's The Jump. In December 2018, Argent made another pantomime appearance, as Abanazar in Aladdin, which took place at the Middleton Arena. In 2018, it was announced that producers The Only Way Is Essex had not renewed their contract with Argent.

== Personal life ==
In August 2014, Argent was reported missing from his home when he failed to show up for a scheduled flight; however, he was found just over 24 hours later. In October 2014, Argent was suspended from The Only Way Is Essex after failing a drug test. He attended rehab later that year, and returned to the series in 2015.

Argent was in a relationship with Lydia Bright from 2007 to 2012 and 2015 to 2016. Argent briefly dated Gemma Collins in 2012; and the pair were in an on-and-off relationship from December 2017 until July 2020. From 2022 to 2023, he dated Stella Turian, an Italian actress who is 17 years his junior.

Argent has regularly been an inpatient at rehabilitation facilities due to his drug abuse, including cocaine.

In April 2021, Argent underwent a sleeve gastrectomy procedure, after his weight reached 27 stone (378 lbs).

In May 2025, Argent was convicted of a gender violence offence against his partner Nicoline Artursson, receiving a six-month suspended sentence.

== Filmography ==
As himself
Year	Show	Notes
2010–2018	The Only Way Is Essex	Series regular; 232 episodes
2013	Celebrity Super Spa	
2011, 2013	All Star Family Fortunes	Contestant; with his family
2016	Sugar Free Farm	Participant
2016	The Jump	Participant
2017	Celebs Go Dating	Participant; 3rd series
2019	Good Morning Britain	Entertainment presenter
2019	Gemma Collins: Diva Forever	Main cast
2019	Celebrity Coach Trip	Participant
2022	The Real Dirty Dancing	Participant; 8 episodes
2022	Fame in the Family	Celebrity host; 1 episode

== Stage ==
Year	Title	Role	Venue
2015–2016	Cinderella	Dandini	Kings Theatre
2018	Aladdin	Abanazar	Middleton Arena

== See also ==
- List of solved missing person cases (post-2000)
