= Sugar Free Farm =

- Genre: Reality television
- Narrated by: Olivia Colman (2016); Helen Baxendale (2017)
- Country of origin: United Kingdom
- Original language: English
- No. of series: 2
- No. of episodes: 7

Production
- Running time: 60 minutes (inc. adverts)

Original release
- Network: ITV
- Release: 26 January 2016 – 31 January 2017

Sugar Free Farm is a British television show that sees celebrities take on a sugar-free diet. It debuted on ITV on 26 January 2016.

== Episodes ==
Series	Episodes	Originally released	
Series	Episodes	First released	Last released
1	3	26 January 2016	9 February 2016
2	4	10 January 2017	31 January 2017

== Series 1 (2016) ==
=== Celebrities ===
The celebrities were announced in December 2015/January 2016.

Celebrity	Known for
James "Arg" Argent	Reality TV star
Tupele Dorgu	Actress
Jennifer Ellison	Actress
Mark Labbett	International The Chase star
Jane McDonald	Singer & former Loose Women panellist
Rory McGrath	Comedian

=== Ratings ===
No.	Original air date	Viewers (millions)	ITV weekly rating
1	26 January 2016	—N/a	—N/a
2	2 February 2016	2.91	30
3	9 February 2016	2.85	26

== Series 2 (2017) ==
=== Celebrities ===
The celebrities for the second series were announced in November 2016.

Celebrity	Known for
Gemma Collins	Television personality
Peter Davison	Former Doctor Who star
Stavros Flatley	Dancers
Alison Hammond	TV presenter
Joe Pasquale	Actor and comedian
Ann Widdecombe	Former politician
