= Louisa Lytton =

English actress (born 1989)

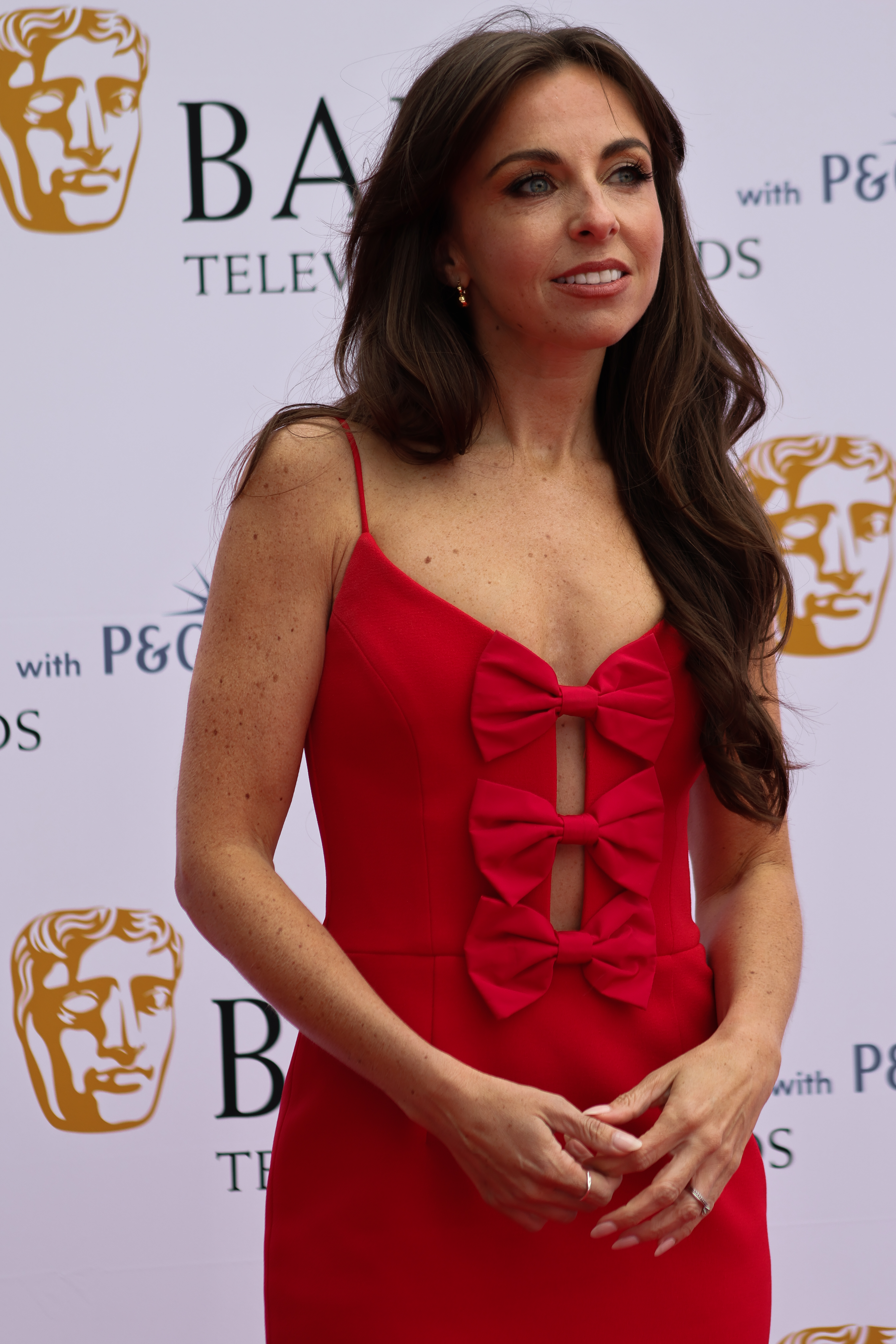
- Lytton at the 2026 British Academy Television Awards
- Born: Louisa Claire Lytton; 7 February 1989 (age 37); Camden, London, England
- Years active: 1997–present
- Television: EastEnders; The Bill
- Spouse: Ben Bhanvra (m. 2022)
- Children: 1

Louisa Claire Lytton (born 7 February 1989) is an English actress, best known for playing Ruby Allen in the BBC soap opera EastEnders (2005–2006, 2018–2021, 2024–2025) and Beth Green in the ITV police procedural series The Bill (2007–2009). She also appeared as a contestant on the fourth series of Strictly Come Dancing in 2006 and represented the UK at the Eurovision Dance Contest 2008, finishing ninth. Her theatre credits include playing Betty Rizzo in the UK touring production of the musical Grease (2017) and Jenny in 2:22 A Ghost Story (2023).

== Early life ==
Louisa Claire Lytton was born on 7 February 1989 in the London Borough of Camden. She attended the Sylvia Young Theatre School in Marylebone, London. She is of Italian descent on her mother's side and her first cousin once removed is Lisa Maffia, a member of the So Solid Crew.

== Career ==
=== EastEnders ===
Lytton made her first appearance in EastEnders on 18 March 2005, playing Johnny Allen's daughter Ruby Allen. In July 2006, weeks after winning the "Sexiest Female" award at the British Soap Awards, it was announced that Lytton would be leaving EastEnders in November 2006. On the exit of her character, Lytton had commented: "I've really enjoyed my time at EastEnders. It has been a great experience which I will never forget but I am now looking forward to trying new things and not getting typecast." Lytton's final scenes were broadcast in November 2006. On 1 December 2006, Lytton appeared on the ITV1 show Loose Women and confirmed that leaving EastEnders was not her decision. In August 2008 she stated she would like to return to EastEnders once she had left The Bill.

On 18 July 2018, Lytton was announced to be reprising her role as Ruby. Lytton revealed that she was shocked to be asked back to EastEnders after such a long time, and told Metro UK, "In my head, obviously I'd always have loved to go back to the show because it was where I started out, but it had been so long that it was never an option in my head anymore [...] I genuinely never thought about it being an option, especially because my dad had died in the show."

Following a twelve-year hiatus, Ruby returned on 18 September 2018. Producers soon placed her at the centre of a sexual consent storyline, involving a special episode about the views surrounding consent. Lytton was nominated for two Digital Spy Reader Awards for the consent storyline, while Lytton and the storyline were praised by viewers and critics alike.

Lytton left the serial for the second time in late 2021, following the birth of her first child. In March 2022, Lytton admitted she may never return to the soap. However in September 2024, it was announced that Lytton would be reprising the role for a prolonged stint later in the year. Following the announcement of her return, Lytton stated "I am thrilled to have been asked back to the Square to revisit Ruby once more, and to shed some light on what the past three years have been like for her during her time away from Walford. I've always loved playing Ruby as there is never a dull moment and I cannot wait for everyone to see what Ruby has in store."

=== Strictly Come Dancing ===
In late 2006, Lytton took part in the fourth series of the BBC competition Strictly Come Dancing. Aged 17 at the time, she is the youngest ever contestant to have appeared on the show. Lytton's professional dance partner was Vincent Simone. Following several impressive performances, she was eliminated in the quarter-finals, finishing in fourth place out of fourteen and losing out to Emma Bunton in the viewer vote for a place in the last three. Despite this, Lytton appeared in the Christmas Special on Christmas Day with fellow contestants Mark Ramprakash, Matt Dawson and Emma Bunton, along with 2005's finalists Zoe Ball and Colin Jackson. This show was won by Jackson. Below is a scoring recap from start to finish.

Week #	Dance/Song	Judges' score					Result
Week #	Dance/Song	Horwood	Phillips	Goodman	Tonioli	Total	Result
2	Quickstep / Don't Get Me Wrong	7	8	6	7	28	Safe
3	Jive / Smiley Faces	8	9	9	10	36	Safe
4	Foxtrot / Piece of My Heart	7	5	6	8	26	Safe
5	Salsa / Bailamos	6	8	7	8	29	Safe
6	Samba / Rhythm of the Night	8	8	8	8	32	Safe
7	Tango / Sweet Dreams (Are Made of This)	8	9	9	9	35	Safe
8	Paso Doble / Left Outside Alone	8	8	9	9	34	Safe
9	Viennese Waltz / That's Amore; Cha-Cha-Cha / Rescue Me	8; 9	8; 9	8; 9	9; 9	33; 36	Safe
10	American Smooth / Do Nothing Until You Hear From Me; Rumba / (Everything I Do) I Do It for You	7; 7	8; 7	8; 7	8; 7	31; 28	Eliminated

In 2008, Lytton embarked on Strictly Come Dancing Live!, which toured the country. Speaking of her time on Strictly, Lytton said she "absolutely loved taking part in Strictly Come Dancing and jumped at the chance to take part in the live show, and thanks to [her] bosses at The Bill, [she had] the chance to get back out there and this time, fingers crossed, win it for the girls!". She won numerous times. The tour began on 18 January 2008, and Lytton competed alongside her EastEnders co-stars, Letitia Dean and Matt Di Angelo, ending the tour with 11 wins. Along with her EastEnders co-star Christopher Parker, Lytton was vocal in her criticism of the media treatment of John Sergeant, which led to him resigning from the 2008 series of Strictly Come Dancing. She said she was surprised that Arlene Philips was removed as a judge from the next series of Strictly Come Dancing due to her age and she was replaced by former contestant and 2007 winner Alesha Dixon.

In October 2019, it was confirmed that Lytton would return to Strictly Come Dancing for a Children in Need special with EastEnders co-stars Maisie Smith, Rudolph Walker and Ricky Champ. It was announced that she would be partnered with Gorka Márquez. On an Instagram post, Lytton revealed that she had remembered nothing about dancing from when she took part in the show, 13 years previously.

=== Other work ===
Lytton was Emma Watson's double in the film Harry Potter and the Chamber of Secrets.

Between leaving EastEnders and joining The Bill she made an appearance on the CBBC show Hider in the House as herself. She has appeared on The Paul O'Grady Show to promote her role in The Bill. She also appeared on Big Brother's Little Brother with Dermot O'Leary. On 26 June 2007, she made a second appearance on lunchtime show Loose Women, this time promoting her addition to the cast of The Bill. She also briefly appeared in Emma Bunton's video for her single "Downtown" for Children in Need. She has been on the TV show This Morning several times.

On 16 May 2007, Lytton first appeared in the ITV1 police drama The Bill as PC Beth Green. She had previously appeared as a different character in a 1997 episode, coincidentally starring alongside actor Billy Murray, who previously played her father in EastEnders. She left the show in March 2009. On 27 August 2007, Lytton appeared on BBC's Test The Nation and was the top "Celebrity" participant. She attended numerous charity events and movie premieres throughout the year such as "Children's Champions" in 2007 and 2009 and the "Legends Ball" in 2008. She was a member of the audience on Happy Birthday Brucie which celebrated TV presenter Bruce Forsyth's 80th birthday in 2008. Lytton was chosen as one half of the United Kingdom's entry for the Eurovision Dance Contest 2008, finishing 9th out of 14 countries.

Lytton appeared on BBC Breakfast for a second time in January 2008 and a third time in September 2008. Lytton appeared on GMTV for a third time in March 2009 as well as Loose Women for a third time. She played Imogen in American Pie Presents: The Book of Love. The seventh instalment from the franchise was released straight to DVD in December 2009. On 13 July 2009, Lytton went on GMTV to talk about her roles in the Shakespearean plays Much Ado About Nothing and A Midsummer Night's Dream. This interview was conducted with Lorraine Kelly on her segment of the show. She appeared in FHM December 2009 issue. She gave an interview along with provocative pictures of herself in her bra and panties and lingerie.

In April 2010, Lytton took part in the ITV series The Door. On 12 June 2010, Lytton was a guest star on Casualty on BBC1, on which she played goth girl Grace Fielding.

In 2012, she played Stephanie in the film The Knot. She also appeared in the film Payback Season, in which she played Keisha. In February 2012, she attended the press night for magician Hans Klok's show The Houdini Experience at The Peacock Theatre in London.

In 2013, she was in Young High and Dead, in which she played a character called Jenny.

In 2014, she played Michelle in the ITV sitcom series Edge of Heaven.

In 2015, she appeared in a music video for ILL BLU – Give Me ft. Kahlia Bakosi. In the same year, Louisa played Ginny Beasley in an episode of Murdoch Mysteries called Barenaked Ladies.

In 2016, Lytton took part in the third series of The Jump. She was the first celebrity to be eliminated on 31 January. She also played the part of Alva in Fractured, an independent film released in 2016.

In 2023, Lytton co-founded a children's clothing company named Aura Soul after her daughter.

=== Theatre ===
In 2001, Lytton was in a musical production of Les Misérables, and played the leading role in the musical, Annie.

In September 2012, Lytton was in the stage show A Broken Rose, playing the lead character Maria.

Lytton performed in the Peter Pan Pantomime at the Milton Keynes Theatre in 2008, and again at the Deco Theatre, Northampton in 2009. The same year, she joined the British Shakespeare Company to tour the UK and Prague, playing Cobweb (a fairy) in A Midsummer Night's Dream, and Hero in Much Ado About Nothing. Her other theatre credits include playing Debs in the Boogie Nights UK tour (Jan – April 2013), Princess Aurora in the pantomime Sleeping Beauty at the Hazlitt Theatre (2017), and Betty Rizzo in a UK tour of the musical Grease (2017–2018).

In April 2022, Lytton returned to work following her maternity leave, by giving a theatrical performance at Theatre Royal, Windsor, where she was praised by many fans and critics alike. In 2023, Lytton played Jenny in 2:22 A Ghost Story. In 2025, she starred as Rachel Dawson in a UK tour of The Girl on the Train. In 2026, she appeared as Meg in the play The Battle.

== Personal life ==
When she was younger, Lytton dated singer Aston Merrygold. In February 2011, she received a 14-month driving ban and was fined £350 after being arrested for drink driving the previous month.

In 2017, Lytton began a relationship with businessman Ben Bhanvra, after the pair met through a mutual friend. The pair got engaged on 7 February 2019, on Lytton's 30th birthday. In March 2021, the couple announced that their first child was due later in the year. Their daughter was born on 30 August 2021. On 9 July 2022, Lytton married Bhanvra in a private ceremony in Italy, attended by ninety guests, including EastEnders co-stars James Bye, Lacey Turner, Mohammed George and Zaraah Abrahams.

== Filmography ==
=== Film ===
Year	Title	Role	Notes	Ref.
2008	Disappeared	Stacy	Short film	
2009	American Pie Presents: The Book of Love	Imogen	Direct-to-video	
2012	Payback Season	Keisha	Supporting role	
2012	The Knot	Stephanie	Supporting role	
2013	Young, High and Dead	Jenny	Supporting role	
2016	Fractured	Alva	Supporting role	

=== Television ===
Year	Title	Role	Notes	Ref.
1997	The Bill	Natalie Shepherd	Episode: "Only the Lonely"	
1999	Let Them Eat Cake	Little Girl	Episode: "The Marriage of Convenience"	
2005–2006, 2018–2021, 2024–2025	EastEnders	Ruby Allen	Series regular	
2006	Strictly Come Dancing	Herself	Contestant; series 4	
2007–2009	The Bill	PC Beth Green	Series regular	
2010	The Door	Herself	Two-part celebrity series	
2010	Identity	Lucy Fox	Episode: "Tomorrow"	
2010	Casualty	Grace Fielding	Episode: "Inconvenient Truths"	
2014	Edge of Heaven	Michelle	6 episodes	
2015-2019	Murdoch Mysteries	Ginny Beasley	Recurring Role (2 Episodes)	
2016	The Jump	Herself	Series 3	
2018	On Order and Away	Dizzy	Episode: "Salad Dressing"	

== Stage ==
Year	Title	Role	Notes	Ref.
2008–2009	Peter Pan	Peter	Milton Keynes Theatre	
2009	A Midsummer Night's Dream	Hermia	British Shakespeare Company	
2009	Much Ado about Nothing	Beatrice	British Shakespeare Company	
2011–2012	Cinderella	Cinderella	Camberley Theatre	
2012–2013	Boogie Nights	Debs	UK Tour	
2016–2017	Sleeping Beauty	Sleeping Beauty	Hazlitt Theatre	
2017	Grease	Rizzo	UK Tour	
2022	The Vagina Monologues	Various	UK Tour (Various Locations)	
2023–2024	2:22 A Ghost Story	Jenny	UK Tour	
2025	The Girl on the Train	Rachel	UK Tour	
2026	The Battle	Meg	UK tour	

== Awards and nominations ==
Year	Award	Category	Result	Ref.
2006	The British Soap Awards	Sexiest Female	Won	
2018	Digital Spy Reader Awards	Best Soap Actor (Female)	Fourth	
2019	2019 British Soap Awards	Best Actress	Nominated	
2019	Inside Soap Awards	Best Actress	Nominated	
2019	I Talk Telly Awards	Best Soap Performance	Nominated	
