= Mark-Francis Vandelli =

English television personality (born 1989)

- Born: 14 October 1989 (age 37); Chelsea, London, England
- Education: University College London
- Occupation: Television personality
- Years active: 2011–present
- Television: Made in Chelsea; The Jump; Celebs Go Dating; Ladies of London: The New Reign

Mark-Francis Vandelli (born 14 October 1989) is an English television personality. He is best known for his role on the E4 series Made in Chelsea.

== Early life and education ==
Mark-Francis was born on 14 October 1989 in London, England. He is the only child of Russian princess and model Diane Boulting-Casserley Vandelli, and Italian businessman, Marzio Vandelli. His parents split when he was a baby. He is of Italian, English and Russian descent. He grew up trilingual, speaking English, Italian and French from an early age.

Vandelli was raised on the historic Cheyne Walk in Chelsea, London. He was educated at Hill House School and St Paul's School, and studied Art History at University College London.

== Career ==
=== Television Career ===
In April 2011, Vandelli joined reality television programme Made in Chelsea as one of the original cast members. In January 2016, Vandelli joined the third series of The Jump. He withdrew from the show on 9 February due to injury.

In 2017, he starred in a Made in Chelsea spin-off entitled Mark-Francis' Big Night Out. In 2023, Vandelli joined series 12 of Celebs Go Dating on E4.

In 2026, Vandelli joined the cast of the reality television series Ladies of London: The New Reign, which premiered on Bravo on March 5, 2026.

=== Design Career ===
Vandelli works as an official ambassador and tastemaker for Christie's auction house. Vandelli hosts a digital series for the auction house, "Decorative Delights with Mark-Francis Vandelli," where he showcases premium ceramics, silverware, furniture, and historical jewellery.

Vandelli founded luxury fine jewellery brand Roubier in 2024. His pieces focus on classical European designs and rare gemstones.

== Personal life ==
Vandelli resides in Knightsbridge, London in a townhouse formerly inhabited by Oscar Wilde. He is openly gay.

Vandelli is the godfather to the son of Lady Emma Thynn, the Marchioness of Bath.

== Filmography ==
Year	Title	Role	Notes
2011–2022	Made in Chelsea	Himself	Series regular (series 1–23, 199 episodes)
2012	Alan Carr: Chatty Man	Himself	Guest (1 episode; 4 May)
2013	Celebrity Juice	Himself	Guest (1 episode; 17 November)
2015–2016	Virtually Famous	Himself	Guest (2 episodes; 13 April 2015, 22 March 2016)
2016	The Jump	Contestant	Series 3, 2 episodes
2017	Mark-Francis' Big Night Out	Presenter	Spin-off series
2019	Celebs On The Ranch	Himself	Main Cast
2020	Come Dine with Me	Himself	Guest
2021	Tipping Point: Lucky Stars	Himself	Guest (1 episode; 18 April)
2023	Celebs Go Dating	Himself	Series 12
2026	Ladies of London	Himself	Main cast (season 4)
