= Henry Conway (socialite) =

British socialite and author (born 1982)

- Born: Henry Charles Conway; 3 July 1982 (age 44); Newcastle, England
- Education: Harrow School; University of Cambridge; The Courtauld Institute of Art
- Occupations: Journalist and party promoter
- Parent(s): Derek and Colette Conway

Henry Conway (born 3 July 1982) is an English socialite, party promoter, author and fashion journalist, occasionally self-styled as "Queen Sloane". He came to the attention of the press in January 2008 as a result of a scandal involving his father, former Conservative MP Derek Conway.

== Derek Conway investigation ==
Derek Conway was suspended from the House of Commons after the Committee on Standards and Privileges reported that the MP had misused taxpayers' money by paying his younger son Frederick (Freddie) as a research assistant even though there was no record of his work. Derek Conway maintained that both sons did work as research assistants and that the lack of records in respect of Freddie was merely a result of administrative shortcomings.

After receiving a complaint, John Lyon, the Parliamentary Commissioner for Standards, announced in February 2008 that he would investigate whether or not Henry's employment was also in breach of normal protocol. The investigation was completed the following year, when it was concluded that Henry was overpaid for the work he did as a research assistant. Henry continued to be associated with the scandal for years afterwards.

== Career ==
=== Party promoter ===
Conway is mainly known as the organiser of Thursday nights at the nightclub Mahiki. In 2008 he was also organiser of Wednesday nights at the London branch of Bungalow 8 and Friday nights at Maya in Soho, and was signed as a promoter for Whiskey Mist, which opened in June 2008. In July 2008 he presided over the launch of Mahiki's own brand of rum.

In November 2007, he held a party with the theme "Fuck Off I'm Rich". After the 2008 scandal broke, "Fuck Off I'm Rich" was frequently mentioned in articles about the Conways. It received attention when The Daily Telegraph published a copy of Conway's invitation in the wake of the parliamentary payment scandal in January 2008. It is typically used as an example of snobbery and decadence, with the Canadian National Post saying "if there ever was a burgeoning meritocracy in Britain, surely it died the night Conway threw a party he called 'Fuck Off I'm Rich.'" Other papers took a lighter view of the party, with The Guardian calling it "undoubtedly magical" and saying sarcastically "everything about that sounds tempting, does it not?". Several years afterwards, in 2012, Marina Hyde described Conway's party as "legendary", cynically comparing it to the excesses that predated the French Revolution.

Conway was interviewed by the journalist, Richard Godwin, for a 2011 article about the clubbing scene in Chelsea. He continues to organise events and club nights, such as a major Alice in Wonderland-themed club night for New Year's Eve 2011, held at the Sanderson in London.

=== Journalism ===
Conway has written fashion columns for Super Super magazine (2010). His column, "Conway Confidential", was syndicated to the ten London magazines published by Archant (including The Resident, The Hill and The Grove). In 2011, Conway was among the fashion commentators approached by The Telegraph to assess Catherine, Duchess of Cambridge's Ascot outfit for 2011.

=== Television ===
Conway has also acted as a fashion pundit for television programmes, including the BBC's Newsnight Review. Other television programmes he has appeared on include Twiggy's Frock Exchange, the BBC series British Style Genius, and Living's The Truth About Beauty. He is a regular co-presenter on Five's Vanessa Show and also appeared on Five's Live from Studio Five. In early 2012 he launched a new makeover show on MTV, Vera Wang Princess Super Sweet Party.

In January 2014, he was a contestant in the Channel 4 show The Jump. He competed in the Men's Giant Slalom in the first show and placed 4th with 47.77. Later, Conway sustained an injury to his hand during the training session for the skeleton competition which aired on 28 January 2014 and, subsequently, was forced to retire after seeking medical advice.

== Style and social life ==
Conway's flamboyant personality, colourful social life and outrageous outfits were widely reported throughout 2008, such as when he wore a corset for photos accompanying his profile in the June 2008 edition of Tatler. Deborah Ross, of The Independent, described Conway as "deliciously committed to fashion" citing his wearing of ruffled cravats and sequined peacock-feather headdresses as examples. Jonathan Brown, also of The Independent, described him as "a dandy, always flamboyantly dressed." Hadley Freeman of The Guardian sarcastically wrote that "It's a rare pleasure to encounter a person in the real world who appears to have stepped straight out of a novel, but such is the gift that Henry Conway ... brings into our lives."

In 2009, Conway made it into the number 12 slot of British GQ's Top 20 Worst-Dressed Men 2009, for "going way past the mark of being too flamboyant". Reports sometimes note Conway's chosen styling: "Queen Sloane", an apparent reference to the term "Sloane Ranger" and the posh of Sloane Square.
