= Nickheads =

Nickheads is a daily interactive show presented by Mark and Laura, airing every weekday from 4 pm up to 6 pm on Nickelodeon UK. During Nickheads there are crazy games where viewers must try to guess the outcome via the sky remote. The show also airs popular Nickelodeon shows such as SpongeBob SquarePants and Drake & Josh and during these shows questions about the show pop up at the bottom of the screen and viewers must answer via the sky remote. The viewer at the end of the hour with the most points is the winner. Nickheads is currently airing its second series.
