= Längentalspeicher =

- Location within Austria
- Location: Tyrol, Austria
- Coordinates: 47.2107°N 11.0011°E
- Type: lake

Längentalspeicher is a lake in Tyrol, Austria.
