= Mark Dolan =

English comedian, writer, and presenter

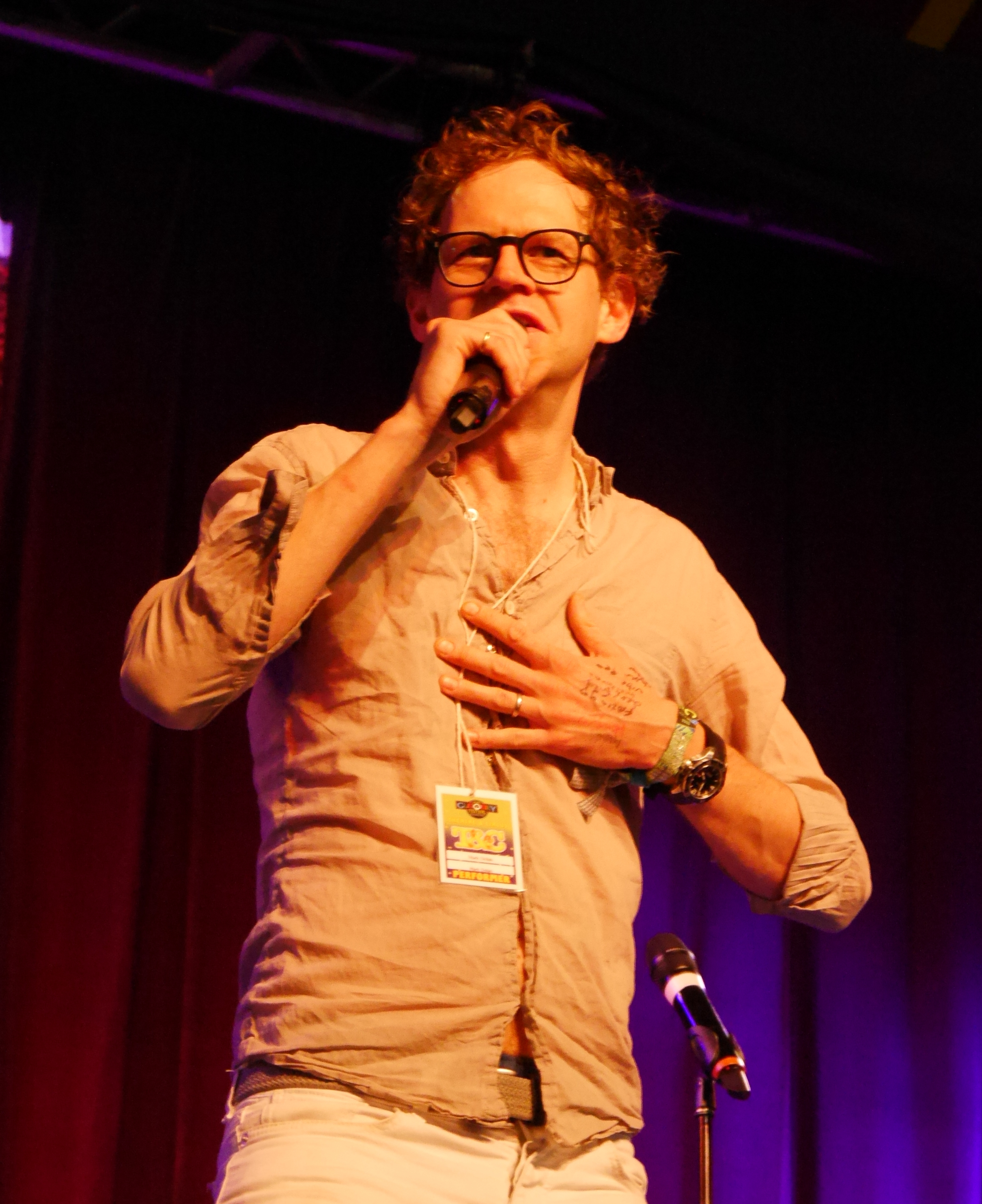
- Dolan performing in June 2019
- Born: 17 March 1974 (age 52); London, England
- Education: University of Edinburgh
- Occupations: Comedian; writer; presenter
- Years active: 2000–present
- Children: 2
- Website: markdolan.com

Mark Dolan (born 17 March 1974) is an English presenter and comedian. He has hosted various shows on UK television, including Balls of Steel for Channel 4 2005 until 2008 and Mark Dolan Tonight and Friday Night Live with Mark Dolan for GB News between 2021 and 2024. In 2025, he joined TalkTV.

== Early life ==
Dolan grew up above the Sir Robert Peel public house in Kentish Town, with his landlord father Seamus, mother Diane, brother and two sisters. Dolan is proud of his background and frequently referred to his childhood on his GB News evening show.

Dolan attended University College School in Hampstead, London and the University of Edinburgh, where he received an MA in politics. Whilst an undergraduate, he performed in the improvisational comedy troupe, The Improverts.

== Career ==
=== Stand-up comedy ===
Dolan started as a stand-up comedian in 2000.

=== Radio ===
In 2017 Dolan returned to radio, presenting a breakfast show on Fubar Radio, an online radio station based in London.

In 2019, Dolan joined Talkradio, where he presented Drivetime from 4pm to 7 Monday to Friday, Saturday nights 10pm to 1am and Sundays 8pm to 10pm. He left the station in July 2021 to join rivals, GB News.

In September 2020, at a time in the COVID-19 pandemic when the wearing of face coverings was compulsory in shops and on public transport in the United Kingdom, Dolan cut up a face mask during a Talkradio broadcast, calling the masks "wretched, godawful, damned, blinking, uncomfortable, scientifically empty, and useless". Dolan's fellow talkRADIO host Jamie East quit the station when Dolan went unpunished by station bosses. Presenter Piers Morgan and doctor Hilary Jones criticised his actions on Good Morning Britain as behaviour that could "cost lives". The next month Dolan clarified that he followed all government rules on mask wearing, but considered the science around them to be "flaky".

=== Television ===
Dolan first came to the public's attention in 2002 after writing and performing in a Comedy Lab entitled 'The Richard Taylor Interviews'.

Dolan was the host of Channel 4 show Balls of Steel, which he presented from 2005 to 2008. He was also the presenter of the TV documentary series The World's ...And Me. The show ran to three series and twelve one-hour films and led to the release of the book The World's Most Extraordinary People and Me, published by HarperCollins.

In 2006, Dolan helped launch More4 as the host of The Last Word, a nightly topical discussion show. He has also fronted shows for E4, including its launch comedy series, Show Me The Funny, and provides his voice as presenter of a new series for Five called Urban Legends. For five years, Dolan was the presenter of Sky Movies' weekly movie-news show 35mm and Channel 4's The Mad Bad Ad Show.

In February 2013, Dolan took part in the fifth series of Let's Dance for Comic Relief as a member of "Destiny's Dad" alongside fellow stand-up comedians Hal Cruttenden and Shaun Keaveny.

In 2015, Dolan co-hosted If Katie Hopkins Ruled the World with British reality TV personality Katie Hopkins.

In 2016, he won the Celebrity Come Dine with Me Christmas Special, with a Dickensian themed meal of pea soup, three bird roast and plum duff as dessert. He also appeared in the fourth and final series of the Channel 4 wintersports entertainment show The Jump, alongside Bradley Wiggins, Robbie Fowler, and Jason Robinson.

Dolan joined GB News on 23 July 2021, presenting various shows on the channel, including Mark Dolan Tonight. Dolan announced on 18 December 2024 that he had been dropped.

Dolan joined Talk TV in 2025.
