= Craig Pellowe =

British artistic gymnast

- Full name: Nathan John Craig Pellowe
- Nickname: Cref
- Born: 1978 or 1979 (age 47–48) Cornwall, England
- Height: 5 ft 6 in (168 cm)

Gymnastics career
- Discipline: Men's artistic gymnastics
- Country represented: (United Kingdom) Great Britain
- Retired: 2003

Nathan John Craig Pellowe (born 1978 or 1979) is a former British international gymnast who was the 2000 Men's English Champion. However, he was forced to retire in 2003 due to a persistent shoulder injury. After retirement, he became a hair stylist in London.

== Early life and education ==
Nathan John Craig Pellowe was born in 1978 or 1979 and grew up in Camborne, Cornwall.

He showed an interest in gymnastics at the age of seven. Attending Camborne School, he trained at the Gazelle Gym Club under coach Dave Veasey. He spent a couple of years at the gymnastics section of the City of Truro Boys' Club, before joining the Swallows Gymnastics Club in Helston. He also trained at Exeter during this period.

== Gymnastic career ==
Pellowe was selected for the England under-15s team at the age of 13. He had stints at an academy in Bristol, and finally landed a place at the Centre of Excellence at Lilleshall.

Pellowe won a place in the England national squad, and then the Great Britain men's team. He appeared many times in the GB squad, and won the English title ("all-round champion") in 2000, as well as British and international medals over his 17-year career. In January 2001, he received the President's Cup for Gymnastic Achievement from the South West Gymnastic committee.

In 2001, he joined a training camp in South Africa, where he won the test event between teams.

In 2002, he was a member of the Hinckley Gymnastics Club when it won the Adams Shield.

Pellowe specialised on pommels and rings.

An ankle injury deprived him of a chance to compete in the 2002 Commonwealth Games. This injury proved to be damaging to Pellowe's career and eventually forced him to retire in early 2003.

== Post gymnastics ==
After retiring from gymnastics, Pellowe started a new career new career as a hair stylist in Nicky Clarke's salon in Mayfair, London.
