= Tina Hobley =

English actress and radio presenter

- Born: Tina Ellen Hobley; 20 May 1971 (age 55); Hampstead, London, England
- Occupations: Actress and radio presenter
- Years active: 1993–present
- Television: Coronation Street (1996–1998); Holby City (2001–2013)
- Spouse(s): Steve Wallington (m. 1998–2001); Oliver Wheeler (m. 2006)
- Children: 3
- Website: Official website

Tina Ellen Hobley (born 20 May 1971) is an English actress and radio presenter, best known for her role as Samantha Failsworth in Coronation Street and her long-running role as Chrissie Williams in the BBC One medical drama series Holby City.

== Early life ==
Hobley was born in Hampstead. She was very shy as a child, and was sent to speech and drama classes in an attempt to counter her introversion. She grew up in the London suburb of Mill Hill and attended Bishop Douglass School in East Finchley. Hobley later transferred to the Webber Douglas Academy of Dramatic Art.

== Career ==
=== Television ===
After graduating from the Webber Douglas Academy of Dramatic Art, where she trained from 1990 to 1993, Hobley had a number of roles in a variety of television dramas, including Coronation Street as Samantha Failsworth, Harbour Lights as WPC Melanie Rush and The Bill as Sue Booker.

Hobley is best known for her role as ward sister Chrissie Williams in BBC medical drama Holby City. Hobley left Holby City in November 2013 after 12 years.

=== Radio ===
On 3 October 2013, Smooth Radio announced that Hobley would become a presenter on the network, fronting a programme on Sunday mornings.

Hobley presented The Smooth Drive Home on Smooth London from January 2017 until July 2019. She currently presents a lunchtime show on Smooth London at the weekends.

=== Theatre ===
From January to July 2015 Hobley co-starred with Jamie Lomas, Rik Makarem, Michael McKell and Gray O'Brien in a touring production of Peter James's "Dead Simple".

== Personal life ==
Hobley's first marriage was to graphic designer Steve Wallington in 1998. Their daughter Isabella, 'Bella', was born in April 1999; the couple divorced in 2001. Hobley is a third cousin of her former Holby City co-star Lauren Drummond, who played Chantelle Lane.

On 22 April 2006, Hobley announced her engagement to Oliver Wheeler, and they married later that year. Hobley gave birth to their daughter Olivia on 18 April 2008, and on 1 March 2010 to son Orson.

In February 2016, she withdrew from competing in the reality show The Jump after dislocating her shoulder, breaking her arm and rupturing her anterior cruciate ligament. Seven months after sustaining these injuries she still had not fully recovered. The damage to her body had limited her movement to the point where she has been unable to perform basic daily tasks by herself.

Hobley is a supporter of the Starlight Foundation. She is also an Ambassador for Barnardo's, and supports the Terrence Higgins Trust and the White Hat Rally. In 2024, Hobley completed a charity mountain trek in Sardinia for Global Radio's Make Some Noise charity initiative.

== Filmography ==
Television
Year	Title	Role	Other notes
1994	The Knock	Estate Agent	Episode No. 1.2
1995	Pie in the Sky	Theresa Collins	Episode 'Hard Cheese'
1995	Bliss	Nurse Valerie	Mini-series
1995	Ghostbusters of East Finchley	Woman on doorstep	Episode No. 1.5
1996	The Bill	Sue Booker	Episode 'Judgment Call'
1996–1998	Coronation Street	Samantha Failsworth	(225 episodes)
1997	The Ruth Rendell Mysteries	Woman on train	Episode May and June Part 1
1997	Another Audience with Freddie Starr	On-screen Participant	
1998	Noel's House Party	On-screen Participant	Episode No. 7.18
1998	The National Lottery Big Ticket	On-screen Participant	Episode No. 1.2
1998	Celebrity Ready Steady Cook	On-screen Participant	Episode dated 7 January
1998	Friday Night's All Wright	On-screen Participant	Episode No. 1.1
1999	Harbour Lights	WPC Melanie Rush	
2001–2013	Holby City	Chrissie Williams	Series 3–16 (406 episodes)
2001	GMTV		Episode dated 9 October
2001	Richard & Judy	Guest	Episode dated 3 December
2003	Today with Des and Mel		Episode dated 11 March
2003	The Terry and Gaby Show		Episode dated 20 October
2003	GMTV		Episode dated 13 October
2004	The Afternoon Play	Gracie Leigh	Episode 'Venus and Mars'
2004	Making It at Holby		
2014	Celebrity MasterChef	Contestant	
2016	The Jump	Contestant	

Guest appearances

- 2003 TV Moments (2003) – Audience member
- This Morning (18 May 2004, 16 November 2010, 14 February 2012)
- Hell's Kitchen (2004) – Episode No. 1.10
- The Paul O'Grady Show (2004) – Episode No. 1.22
- The Xtra Factor (13 November 2004)
- GMTV (22 October 2004)
- Comic Relief Does Fame Academy (2005)
- Test the Nation: The Big Entertainment Test (2005)
- School's Out (2007) – Episode No. 2.3
- The One Show (11 February 2009) – Guest
- All Star Mr & Mrs (23 May 2009) – Contestant with husband, Oli
- Lorraine (27 January 2012) – Guest
- Daybreak (28 January, 8 August 2013) – Guest
- Big Star's Little Star (2 October 2013) – Contestant with daughter Olivia
- The Paul O'Grady Show (19 November 2013)
- Loose Women (30 April 2014)
