= Nicky Clarke =

English hair stylist (b.1958)

Nicky Clarke OBE
- Born: United Kingdom
- Occupations: Hair stylist and media personality

Nicky Clarke OBE is an English hair stylist and media personality who has appeared on several television shows. He closed his salon in 2022.

== Early life and education ==
Clarke grew up in a working-class family and lived in a council flat in London. His mother was a Greek immigrant who met his father when he was stationed in Greece during the war.

In the 1980s, Clarke suffered from a heroin addiction which nearly cost him his life. His then girlfriend, Lesley, gave him an ultimatum of kicking him out or calling the police if he didn't get off the drugs, prompting him to seek help.

== Career ==
Clarke's interest in hairdressing began when he was a teenager. He started off giving his friends and classmates trims before styling professionally aged just 16. When Clarke was 17, he had his first Vogue shoot in 1976 and soon after founded his first salon with John Frieda on Marylebone Road. In the 1990s, he founded his business in Mayfair, London with his then girlfriend Lesley, turning a £20,000 loan into a successful enterprise. He announced the closure of the salon in April 2022.

After retiring from gymnastics owing to injury, in 2003 former England champion gymnast Craig Pellowe started a new career as a hair stylist in Clarke's salon.

== Media appearances ==
Clarke has appeared on several TV shows. In 2002, Clarke was a guest panelist on Will Self's team for an episode of Shooting Stars; his team went on to win that episode. Clarke was also a member of "Team Dec" in Ant & Dec's Saturday Night Takeaway. He appeared on Celebrity Come Dine with Me on Channel 4 on 14 November 2008 and as a judge on the final of Celebrity Scissorhands. In 2011, he took part in ITV series 71 Degrees North but was the first to be eliminated. In January 2014, he took part in the Channel 4 series The Jump. In 2016, he was a contestant on Pointless Celebrities, the celebrity edition of the British quiz show Pointless, with fellow celebrity hairstylist Lee Stafford.

== Recognition and honours ==
Clarke was appointed an Officer of the Order of the British Empire (OBE) in the 2007 Birthday Honours for services to the hairdressing industry.

== Personal life ==
Nicky married Lesley and they had two children. They separated in 1997 but continued to work together as business partners. In 2021, Clarke married his long-term partner Kelly Simpkin, whom he met in 2010 when she was a stylist working for him. The couple have two children together.
