= Lydia Bright =

English television personality

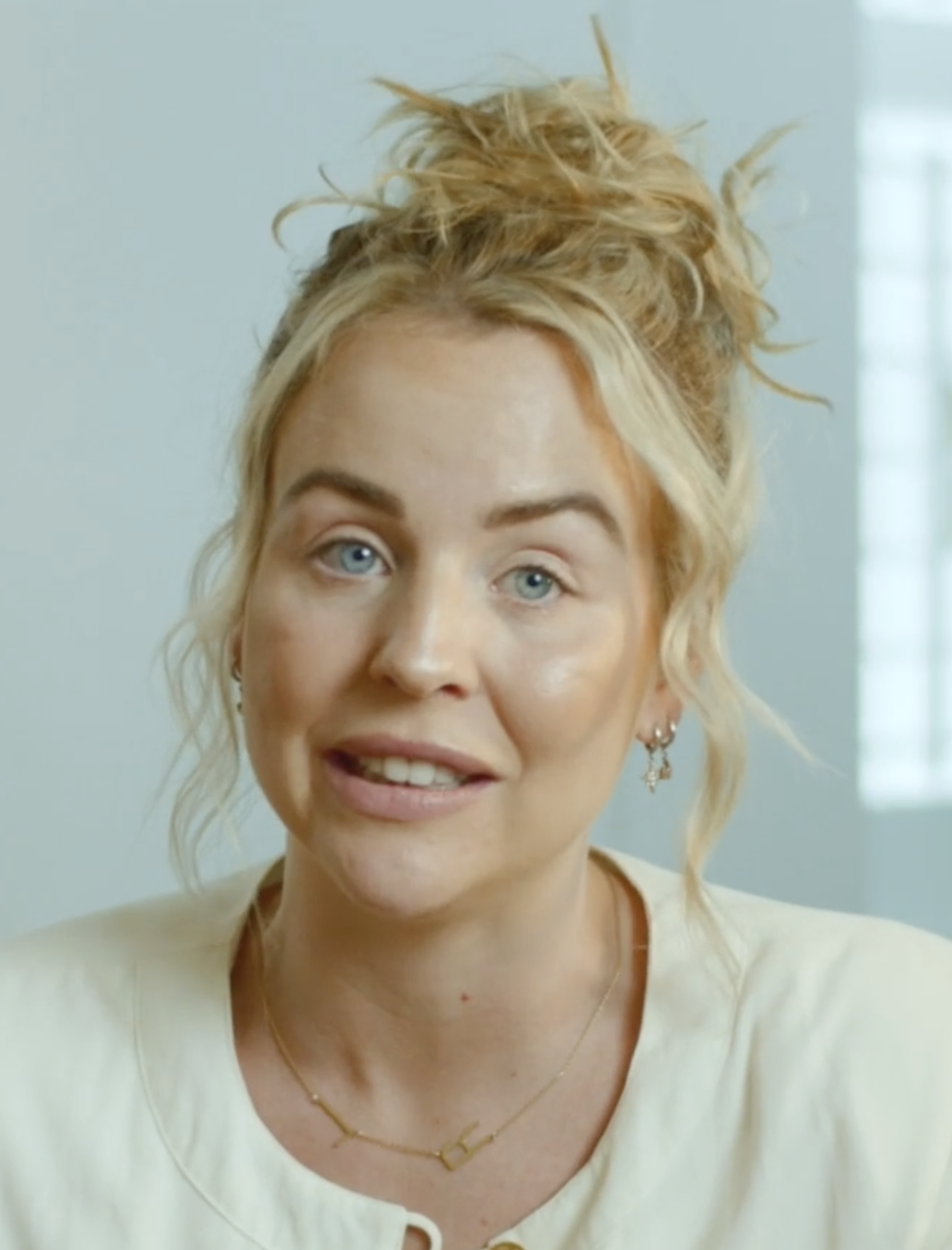
- Bright in 2020
- Born: 20 January 1991 (age 35); Southwark, London, England
- Occupation: Television personality
- Known for: The Only Way Is Essex (2010–12, 2013, 2014–2017); The Celebrity Island with Bear Grylls (2016); The Jump (2017); Celebrity Haunted Mansion (2018)
- Children: 1
- Parents: Dave Bright (father); Debbie Bright (mother)

Lydia-Rose Bright (born 20 January 1991) is an English television personality who is best known for starring in the ITVBe reality television series The Only Way Is Essex. In 2016, she took part in Celebrity Island with Bear Grylls. In February and March 2017, she took part in the fourth series of Channel 4 reality series The Jump.

In 2017, Bright took part in a celebrity version of The Crystal Maze, which aired on 23 June.

Bright was the subject of media ridicule following her appearance on BBC's Celebrity Mastermind in 2018, scoring just 6 points on her specialist subject of Sex and the City, and 2 points in the two minute General Knowledge round. She took part in Celebrity Haunted Mansion in February 2018. On 21 February 2020, Lydia gave birth to her first child a girl named Loretta Rose.
