= High and Mighty (clothing) =

British big-and-tall clothing retailer

- Type: Retail chain
- Industry: Fashion
- Founded: Hull 1956
- Headquarters: Manchester, UK
- Area served: United Kingdom
- Products: Clothing, Shoes
- Parent: J D Williams
- Website: High and Mighty

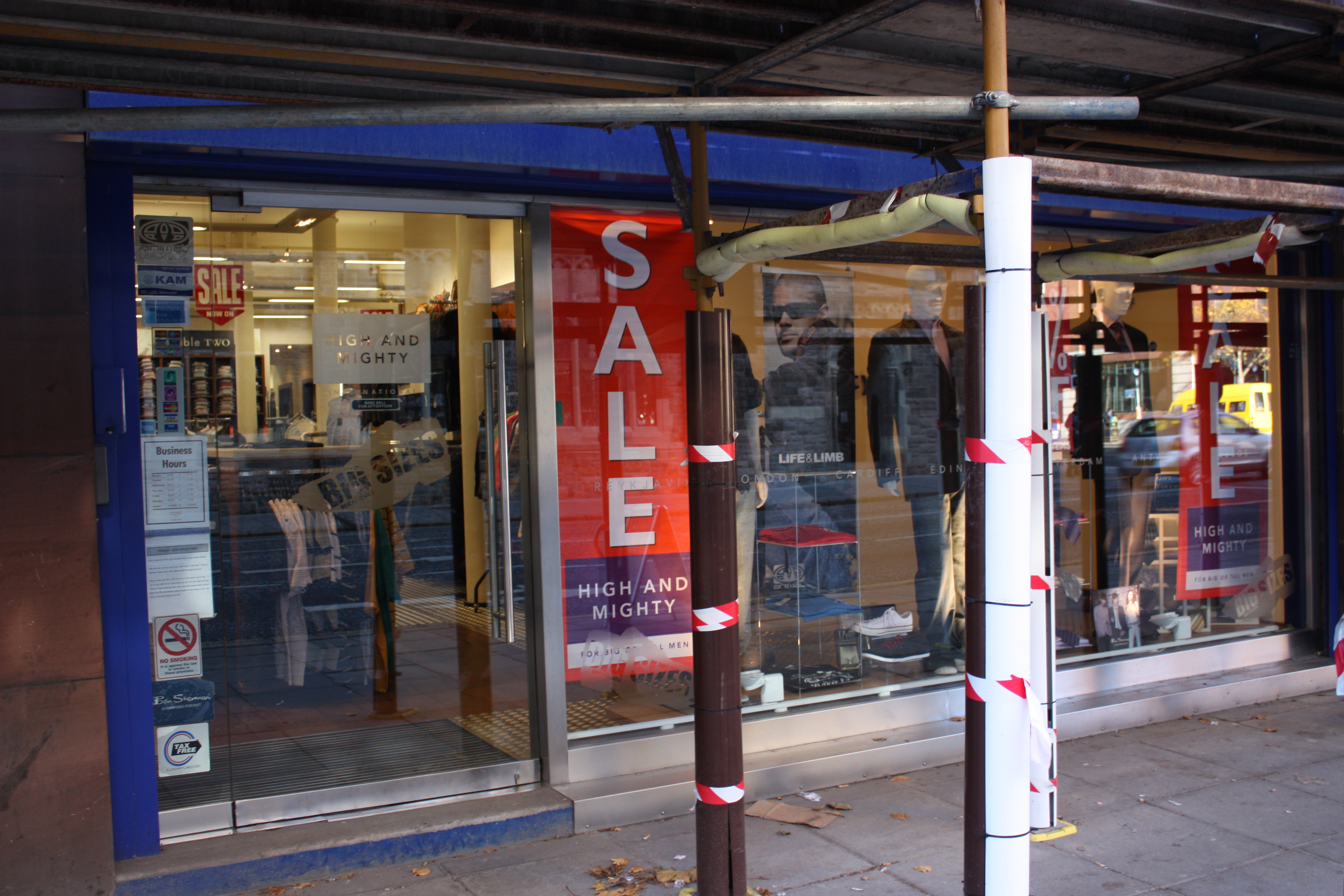
A High and Mighty store in Belfast (2010)

High and Mighty is a clothing retail chain for tall and/or wide men in the United Kingdom. After having been family-owned for more than fifty years, it was sold to mailorder group N Brown in September 2009.

== History ==
The company was founded in Hull in 1956 by tailor Bernard Levy, as a mailorder company. The company's first store was opened in Edgware Road in London in 1959 as Northern Outsize Menswear, soon followed by several more stores. The company changed its name to High and Mighty in the 1970s, and in 1979 it opened stores in New York City and Stamford, Connecticut, trading as London Majesty. It was, however, forced to close the two US stores in 1991.

In 1990, Bernard Levy's daughter, Judith Levy, took over as chairman and managing director, and in 1996 her sister, Ruth Levy-So, joined as business development director. By 2000, the company had 23 stores in the UK and 10 in Belgium, Germany and The Netherlands, and launched its own urban streetwear brand, Kayak.

By 2008, the company started to have financial difficulties, partly because of increased competition from e-commerce retailers. In September 2009 it went into pre-pack administration and was quickly bought by the N Brown Group's main subsidiary, mailorder firm JD Williams, for £1.6 million. 14 of the 21 stores were included in the purchase, and the N Brown management said that they wanted to reinvigorate and expand the chain, which is N Brown's first branded foray on to the high street.

The High and Mighty e-commerce was quickly expanded following the purchase, and several new stores were planned. By September 2010, the number of existing or soon to open stores had risen from 14 to 17, and the flagship store on Edgware Road had been revamped and relaunched with the new High and Mighty look.

== Current situation ==
The online fashion retailer N Brown announced plans in June 2018 to close all 20 of its high street stores in the UK. The stores, trading under the names High & Mighty, Jacamo and Simply Be, have now closed with the loss of 270 jobs.
