= Kühtai Saddle =

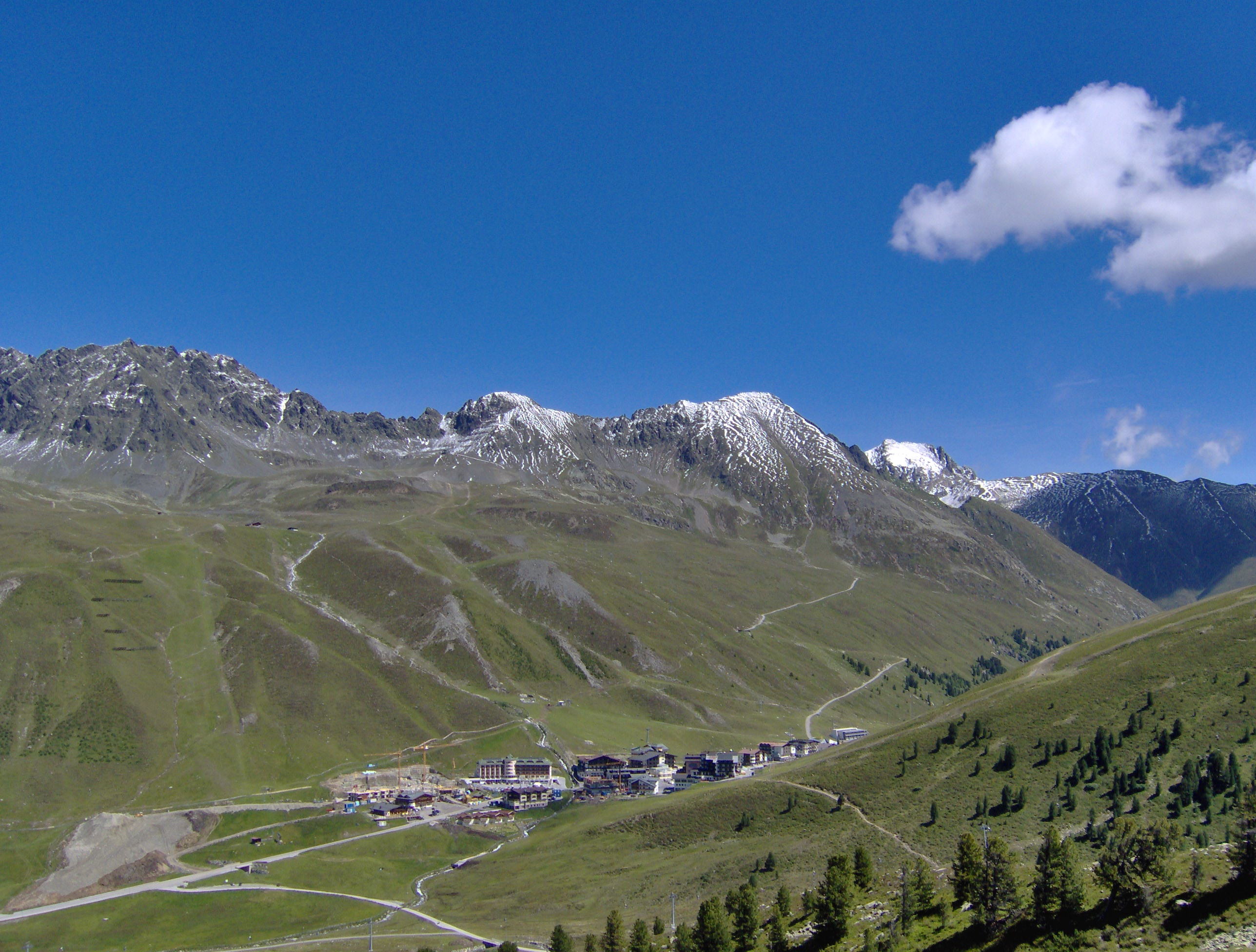
- The winter sports resort Kühtai. The pass road starts in the bottom left corner, running through Kühtai.

- Location within Alps
- Elevation: 2,017 metres (6,617 ft)

Third Approach
- Location: Austria
- Range: Alps
- Coordinates: 47°12′58″N 11°01′49″E

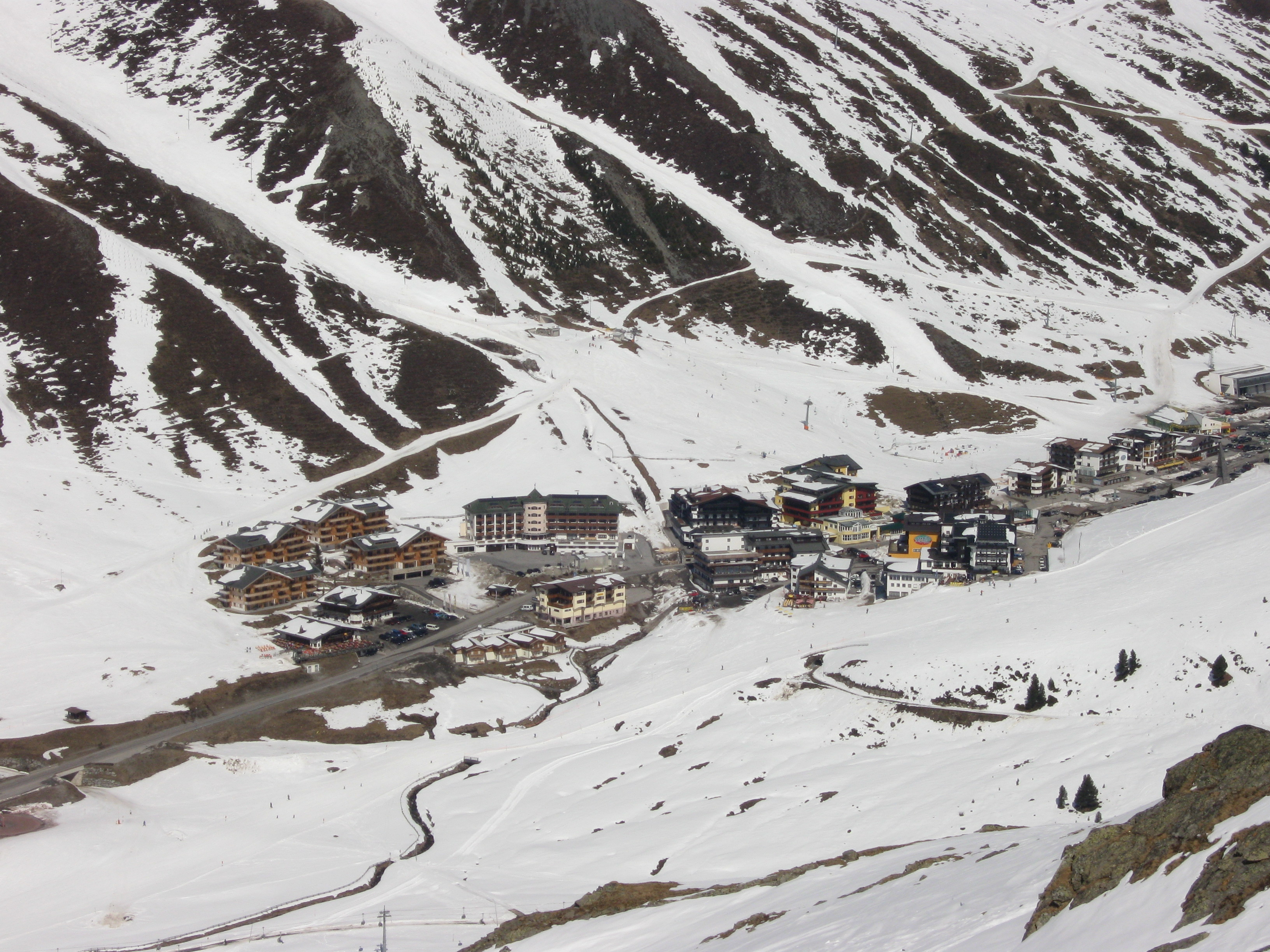
Kühtai in winter

Kühtai Panorama view

Kühtai Saddle (German: Kühtaisattel) (el. 2,017 m (6,617 ft)) is a mountain pass in the Austrian Alps in the Bundesland of Tyrol.

It connects the Ötz river valley from Oetz with Gries im Sellrain. The road from Oetz is 16 km and has a maximum grade of 16 percent. This side is closed to trucking. The road from Gries im Sellrain is 17 km long and also has a maximum grade of 16 percent.

== Kühtai ==
The winter sports resort Kühtai is situated in the saddle. A small village, it is part of the municipality Silz. Population numbers and economic activity in Kühtai are highly seasonal. As of 2001, the number of permanent year-round residents was only 29, but due to the many tourists and seasonal workers, the population is much higher over the winter months.

=== Etymology ===
The name "Kühtai" is derived from the Chutay (literally: cow alp), an alpine pasture farm first attested in 1288.

=== History ===
A road leading up to Kühtai was first completed in 1628, whereupon the alp farm was converted to a hunting castle/lodge. Holidaymakers first arrived in the eighteen-thirties, and towards the end of the nineteenth century, the hunting castle was converted to a hotel. After the end of the Second World War, Kühtai was developed into a winter sports resort.

=== Energy ===
The Längental, Kühtai and Finstertal pumped storage facilities are located in the valley, at different altitudes.

== See also ==
- List of highest paved roads in Europe
- List of mountain passes
