= Dancing on Ice series 9 =

Ninth series of Dancing on Ice

Dancing on Ice
- Series 9
- Presented by: Phillip Schofield; Christine Bleakley
- Judges: Ashley Roberts; Jason Gardiner; Karen Barber; Robin Cousins; Nicky Slater (weeks 6-7)
- Celebrity winner: Ray Quinn
- Professional winner: Maria Filippov
- No. of episodes: 10

Release
- Original network: ITV
- Original release: 5 January – 9 March 2014

Series chronology
- ← Previous; Series 8 Next → Series 10

The ninth series of Dancing on Ice aired from 5 January to 9 March 2014 on ITV. It was announced on 22 October 2013 that this series would be the show's last, and would be an 'All-Stars' series featuring former winners and previous contestants. Phillip Schofield and Christine Bleakley returned to present, with Jayne Torvill and Christopher Dean returning as mentors. Robin Cousins, Jason Gardiner, Karen Barber and Ashley Roberts returned for their ninth, eighth, seventh and second series on The Ice Panel. Cousins was unable to appear on the ice panel during weeks 6 and 7 due to him commentating the 2014 Winter Olympics in Sochi, Russia and was replaced by original judge Nicky Slater, while Barber acted as head judge.

The competition was won by Ray Quinn with professional partner Maria Filippov.

On 4 September 2017, it was announced on This Morning that Dancing on Ice would return after four years off air.

== Couples ==
The official all-star line-up was revealed on 11 December 2013, while the professional partners were revealed on 17 December 2013.

Celebrity	Famous for	Original position	Professional partner	Status
Jorgie Porter	Hollyoaks actress	Series 7 (2nd)	Sylvain Longchambon	Eliminated 1st on 5 January 2014
Joe Pasquale	Comedian	Series 8 (7th)	Robin Johnstone	Eliminated 2nd on 5 January 2014
David Seaman	Former England goalkeeper	Series 1 (4th)	Frankie Poultney	Eliminated 3rd on 12 January 2014
Gary Lucy	EastEnders & The Bill actor	Series 5 (2nd)	Katie Stainsby	Eliminated 4th on 12 January 2014
Todd Carty	Former EastEnders & The Bill actor	Series 4 (9th)	Alexandra Schauman	Eliminated 5th on 19 January 2014
Zaraah Abrahams	Former Coronation Street actress	Series 3 (3rd)	Andy Buchanan	Eliminated 6th on 26 January 2014
Bonnie Langford	West End actress	Series 1 (3rd)	Andrei Lipanov	Eliminated 7th on 2 February 2014
Gareth Gates	Singer-songwriter	Series 3 (4th)	Brianne Delcourt	Eliminated 8th on 9 February 2014
Suzanne Shaw	Hear'Say singer	Series 3 (1st)	Matt Evers	Eliminated 9th on 16 February 2014
Kyran Bracken	Former England rugby player	Series 2 (1st)	Nina Ulanova	Eliminated 10th on 23 February 2014
Sam Attwater	Former EastEnders actor	Series 6 (1st)	Vicky Ogden	Eliminated 11th on 2 March 2014
Beth Tweddle	Olympic artistic gymnast	Series 8 (1st)	Łukasz Różycki	Third place on 9 March 2014
Hayley Tamaddon	Coronation Street actress	Series 5 (1st)	Daniel Whiston	Runners-up on 9 March 2014
Ray Quinn	Actor & The X Factor runner-up	Series 4 (1st)	Maria Filippov	Winners on 9 March 2014

== Scoring chart ==
Couple	Place	1	2	3	4	5	6	7	8	9	10
Ray & Maria	1	29.5	—	35.5	40.0	Won	39.5	40.0+Won=80.0	39.5+40.0=79.5	37.0+40.0=77.0	40.0+40.0=80.0
Hayley & Dan	2	25.5	—	32.5	38.0	Won	36.5	34.5+Lost=34.5	31.5+39.0=70.5	40.0+39.0=79.0	40.0+39.5=79.5
Beth & Łukasz	3	—	28.5	34.0	36.5	Lost	34.5	34.0+Lost=34.0	33.0+32.0=65.0	36.5+37.0=73.5	40.0+39.5=79.5
Sam & Vicky	4	—	30.0	31.0	34.5	Lost	31.5	37.0+Won=74.0	36.5+38.0=74.5	36.5+36.0=72.5	
Kyran & Nina	5	29.5	—	33.0	31.5	Won	33.0	33.0+Won=66.0	34.0+36.5=70.5		
Suzanne & Matt	6	—	35.5	31.0	33.0	Lost	32.5	37.0+Lost=37.0			
Gareth & Brianne	7	22.0	—	25.0	28.0	Won	29.0				
Bonnie & Andrei	8	27.5	—	28.0	27.5	Lost					
Zaraah & Andy	9	—	30.5	30.0	32.0						
Todd & Alex	10	—	16.5	12.0							
Gary & Katie	11	—	24.0								
David & Frankie	12	—	22.5								
Joe & Robin	13	23.5									
Jorgie & Sylvain	14	29.0									

indicates the couple eliminated that week
indicates the couple were in the skate-off but not eliminated
indicates the couple were eliminated immediately (no Skate-off)
indicates the winning couple
indicates the runner-up couple
indicates the third-place couple
Green scores indicate the highest score for that week
Red scores indicate the lowest score for that week
"—" indicates the couple(s) that did not skate that week

=== Average chart ===
This table only counts for dances scored on a traditional 40-point scale (the duel skate from week 5 and the doubled scored from week 7 are not included in the total).

Rank by average	Place	Couple	Total	Number of dances	Average
1	1	Ray & Maria	421.0	11	38.3
2	2	Hayley & Dan	396.0	11	36.0
3	3	Beth & Łukasz	385.5	11	35.0
4	4	Sam & Vicky	311.0	9	34.6
5	6	Suzanne & Matt	169.0	5	33.8
6	5	Kyran & Nina	230.5	7	32.9
7	9	Zaraah & Andy	92.5	3	30.8
8	14	Jorgie & Sylvain	29.0	1	29.0
9	8	Bonnie & Andrei	83.0	3	27.7
10	7	Gareth & Brianne	104.0	4	26.0
11	11	Gary & Katie	24.0	1	24.0
12	13	Joe & Robin	23.5	1	23.5
13	12	David & Frankie	22.5	1	22.5
14	10	Todd & Alex	28.5	2	14.3

== Live show details ==
=== Results summary ===
Colour key

–	Celebrity was in the bottom two or three and had to perform again in the dance-off
–	Celebrity who was immune from the public vote that week
–	Celebrity who was eliminated after dance-off
–	Celebrity who was immediately eliminated
–	Celebrity received the most public votes

Weekly results per couple
Contestant	Week 1	Week 2	Week 3	Week 4	Week 5	Week 6	Week 7	Week 8	Week 9	Week 10	
Contestant	Week 1	Week 2	Week 3	Week 4	Week 5	Week 6	Week 7	Week 8	Week 9	Part 1	Part 2
Ray Quinn	2nd 21.49%	—N/a	2nd 17.62%	2nd 25.11%	Immune	3rd 19.12%	3rd 16.54%	3rd 21.15%	3rd 21.78%	1st 44.31%	Winner; 56.37%
Hayley Tamaddon	1st 31.81%	—N/a	1st 23.02%	1st 27.09%	Immune	1st 27.42%	1st 35.44%	2nd 29.63%	1st 35.81%	2nd 33.21%	Runner-up; 43.63%
Beth Tweddle	—N/a	2nd 20.92%	3rd 16.46%	3rd 19.78%	1st 39.52%	2nd 26.34%	2nd 28.13%	1st 38.12%	2nd 34.71%	3rd 22.48%	Eliminated (week 10)
Sam Attwater	—N/a	5th 7.89%	9th 3.52%	7th 3.62%	4th 11.85%	7th 5.27%	5th 5.15%	5th 5.30%	4th 7.70%	Eliminated (week 9)	
Kyran Bracken	3rd 16.43%	—N/a	8th 6.25%	8th 8.20%	Immune	6th 5.93%	6th 4.53%	4th 5.80%	Eliminated (week 8)		
Suzanne Shaw	—N/a	1st 37.25%	6th 7.54%	4th 6.56%	2nd 30.93%	5th 7.33%	4th 10.20%	Eliminated (week 7)			
Gareth Gates	4th 8.58%	—N/a	5th 7.63%	6th 5.51%	Immune	4th 8.59%	Eliminated (week 6)				
Bonnie Langford	5th 8.39%	—N/a	4th 8.24%	5th 5.76%	3rd 17.07%	Eliminated (week 5)					
Zaraah Abrahams	—N/a	4th 9.62%	10th 2.92%	9th 3.00%	Eliminated (week 4)						
Todd Carty	—N/a	3rd 12.92%	7th 6.80%	Eliminated (week 3)							
Gary Lucy	—N/a	6th 7.27%	Eliminated (week 2)								
David Seaman	—N/a	7th 4.13%	Eliminated (week 2)								
Joe Pasquale	6th 8.08%	Eliminated (week 1)									
Jorgie Porter	7th 5.23%	Eliminated (week 1)									
Skate-off	Langford, Pasquale	Attwater, Lucy	Abrahams, Carty	Abrahams, Bracken	Attwater, Langford	Attwater, Gates	Bracken, Shaw	Attwater, Bracken	Attwater, Quinn	No dance-off or judges' votes	
Barber's vote to save	Langford	Attwater	Abrahams	Bracken	Attwater	—N/a^{2}	—N/a^{2}	Attwater	Quinn	No dance-off or judges' votes	
Roberts's vote to save	Langford	Attwater	Abrahams	Bracken	Attwater	Attwater	Bracken	Attwater	Quinn	No dance-off or judges' votes	
Gardiner's vote to save	Langford	Attwater	Abrahams	Abrahams	Attwater	Attwater	Bracken	Attwater	Quinn	No dance-off or judges' votes	
Cousins's vote to save	—N/a^{1}	—N/a^{1}	—N/a^{1}	Bracken	—N/a^{1}	Attwater^{3}	Bracken^{3}	—N/a^{1}	—N/a^{1}	No dance-off or judges' votes	
Eliminated	Jorgie Porter; 5.23% to save	David Seaman; 4.13% to save	Todd Carty; 0 of 4 votes Majority	Zaraah Abrahams; 1 of 4 votes Majority	Bonnie Langford; 0 of 4 votes Majority	Gareth Gates; 0 of 4 votes Majority	Suzanne Shaw; 0 of 4 votes Majority	Kyran Bracken; 0 of 4 votes Majority	Sam Attwater; 0 of 4 votes Majority	Beth Tweddle; 22.48% to win	Hayley Tamaddon; 43.63% to win
Eliminated	Joe Pasquale; 0 of 4 votes Majority	Gary Lucy; 0 of 4 votes Majority	Todd Carty; 0 of 4 votes Majority	Zaraah Abrahams; 1 of 4 votes Majority	Bonnie Langford; 0 of 4 votes Majority	Gareth Gates; 0 of 4 votes Majority	Suzanne Shaw; 0 of 4 votes Majority	Kyran Bracken; 0 of 4 votes Majority	Sam Attwater; 0 of 4 votes Majority	Beth Tweddle; 22.48% to win	Hayley Tamaddon; 43.63% to win

- ^1 Cousins did not need to vote as there was already a majority.
- ^2 Barber did not need to vote as there was already a majority.
- ^3 In Cousins' absence, Nicky Slater voted on his behalf.

=== Week 1 (5 January) ===
- Group performance: "The Best Is Yet to Come"—Michael Bublé

Order	Couple	Judges' scores				Total	Scoreboard	Song	Points	Public vote	Result
Order	Couple	Cousins	Barber	Roberts	Gardiner	Total	Scoreboard	Song	Points	Public vote	Result
1	Hayley & Daniel	6.0	7.0	6.0	6.5	25.5	5th	"Call Me Maybe"—Carly Rae Jepsen	7	31.81%	Safe
2	Gareth & Brianne	5.5	6.0	5.5	5.0	22.0	7th	"Patience"—Take That	4	8.58%	Safe
3	Bonnie & Andrei	7.0	7.0	6.5	7.0	27.5	4th	"Too Darn Hot"—Ella Fitzgerald	3	8.39%	Bottom three
4	Ray & Maria	7.5	7.5	7.0	7.5	29.5	=1st	"Best Song Ever"—One Direction	6	21.49%	Safe
5	Jorgie & Sylvain	7.5	7.5	7.5	6.5	29.0	3rd	"I Love It"—Icona Pop	1	5.23%	Eliminated
6	Joe & Robin	5.5	5.5	5.5	7.0	23.5	6th	"Theme from Mission: Impossible"—Lalo Schifrin	2	8.08%	Eliminated
7	Kyran & Nina	8.0	8.0	7.0	6.5	29.5	=1st	"Sir Duke"—Stevie Wonder	5	16.43%	Safe

Save Me skates

1. Bonnie & Andrei: "Baby, It's Cold Outside"—Cerys Matthews & Tom Jones
2. Joe & Robin: "Flash"—Queen

Judges' votes to save

- Barber: Bonnie & Andrei
- Roberts: Bonnie & Andrei
- Gardiner: Bonnie & Andrei
- Cousins: Did not need to vote but would have saved Bonnie & Andrei

=== Week 2 (12 January) ===
- Group performance: "Good Feeling"—Flo Rida (performed by professional skaters)

Order	Couple	Judges' scores				Total	Scoreboard	Song	Points	Public vote	Result
Order	Couple	Cousins	Barber	Roberts	Gardiner	Total	Scoreboard	Song	Points	Public vote	Result
1	Beth & Łukasz	7.0	7.0	7.5	7.0	28.5	4th	"Roar"—Katy Perry	6	20.92%	Safe
2	David & Frankie	5.5	6.5	5.0	5.5	22.5	6th	"You Really Got Me"—The Kinks	1	4.13%	Eliminated
3	Gary & Katie	6.5	6.5	6.0	5.0	24.0	5th	"Pompeii"—Bastille	2	7.27%	Eliminated
4	Zaraah & Andy	8.0	8.0	7.0	7.5	30.5	2nd	"Lady Marmalade"—Labelle	4	9.62%	Safe
5	Sam & Vicky	7.5	8.0	7.5	7.0	30.0	3rd	"Marry You"—Bruno Mars	3	7.89%	Bottom three
6	Todd & Alex	4.5	4.5	4.0	3.5	16.5	7th	"Papa Loves Mambo"—Perry Como	5	12.92%	Safe
7	Suzanne & Matt	9.0	9.0	9.0	8.5	35.5	1st	"Stay"—Rihanna	7	37.25%	Safe

Save Me skates

1. Gary & Katie: "What About Now" – Daughtry
2. Sam & Vicky: "Riverdance"—from Riverdance

Judges' votes to save

- Barber: Sam & Vicky
- Roberts: Sam & Vicky
- Gardiner: Sam & Vicky
- Cousins: Did not need to vote but would have saved Sam & Vicky

=== Week 3 (19 January) ===
Order	Couple	Judges' scores				Total	Scoreboard	Song	Points			Public vote	Result
Order	Couple	Cousins	Barber	Roberts	Gardiner	Total	Scoreboard	Song	Judges	Public	Total	Public vote	Result
1	Suzanne & Matt	7.5	7.5	7.5	8.5	31.0	=5th	"Applause"—Lady Gaga	6	5	11	7.54%	Safe
2	Sam & Vicky	7.5	8.0	8.0	7.5	31.0	=5th	"Stray Cat Strut"—Stray Cats	6	2	8	3.52%	Safe
3	Zaraah & Andy	8.0	8.0	7.0	7.0	30.0	7th	"We Can't Stop"—Miley Cyrus	5	1	6	2.92%	Bottom two
4	Bonnie & Andrei	7.0	7.0	7.0	7.0	28.0	8th	"Sway"—The Pussycat Dolls	4	7	11	8.24%	Safe
5	Gareth & Brianne	7.0	7.0	6.5	4.5	25.0	9th	"We Are Young"—fun.	3	6	9	7.63%	Safe
6	Ray & Maria	8.5	9.0	9.0	9.0	35.5	1st	"Blurred Lines"—Robin Thicke feat. T.I & Pharrell Williams	10	9	19	17.62%	Safe
7	Todd & Alex	3.0	3.5	4.0	1.5	12.0	10th	"'O sole mio"—Luciano Pavarotti	2	4	6	6.80%	Eliminated
8	Beth & Łukasz	8.5	9.0	8.0	8.5	34.0	2nd	"Somewhere Only We Know"—Lily Allen	9	8	17	16.46%	Safe
9	Kyran & Nina	9.0	8.5	8.0	7.5	33.0	3rd	"Love Me Again"—John Newman	8	3	11	6.25%	Safe
10	Hayley & Dan	8.5	8.5	8.0	7.5	32.5	4th	"If My Friends Could See Me Now"—from Sweet Charity	7	10	17	23.02%	Safe

Save Me skates

1. Zaraah & Andy: "Diamonds and Pearls"—Prince
2. Todd & Alex: "Help!"—The Beatles

Judges' votes to save

- Barber: Zaraah & Andy
- Roberts: Zaraah & Andy
- Gardiner: Zaraah & Andy
- Cousins: Did not need to vote but would have saved Zaraah & Andy

=== Week 4 (26 January) ===
- Theme- Dance Week
- Torvill & Dean performance: "In My Life" (performed with Rebecca Ferguson)
- Special musical guest: Rebecca Ferguson—"All That I've Got" (accompanied by professional skaters)

Order	Couple	Judges' scores				Total	Scoreboard	Song	Style	Points			Public vote	Result
Order	Couple	Cousins	Barber	Roberts	Gardiner	Total	Scoreboard	Song	Style	Judges	Public	Total	Public vote	Result
1	Kyran & Nina	8.0	8.0	8.0	7.5	31.5	7th	"Great Balls of Fire"—Jerry Lee Lewis	Rock & Roll	3	2	5	3.57%	Bottom two
2	Suzanne & Matt	7.5	7.5	9.0	9.0	33.0	5th	"The Flower Duet"—Léo Delibes	Ballet	5	6	11	6.56%	Safe
3	Gareth & Brianne	7.0	7.5	8.0	5.5	28.0	8th	"Hot in Herre"—Nelly	Street	2	4	6	5.51%	Safe
4	Bonnie & Andrei	6.5	6.5	7.5	7.0	27.5	9th	"What the World Needs Now Is Love"—Dionne Warwick	Waltz	1	5	6	5.76%	Safe
5	Sam & Vicky	8.5	8.5	9.0	8.5	34.5	4th	"Work"—Kelly Rowland	Bhangra	6	3	9	3.62%	Safe
6	Zaraah & Andy	8.0	8.5	8.0	7.5	32.0	6th	"Puttin' On the Ritz"—Ella Fitzgerald	Jazz	4	1	5	3.00%	Eliminated
7	Beth & Łukasz	9.0	9.5	9.0	9.0	36.5	3rd	"Hey Brother"—Avicii	Scottish	7	7	14	19.78%	Safe
8	Hayley & Dan	9.5	9.5	9.5	9.5	38.0	2nd	"Bang Bang"—will.i.am feat. Leah McFall	Charleston	8	9	17	27.09%	Safe
9	Ray & Maria	10.0	10.0	10.0	10.0	40.0	1st	"Malagueña"—The Brian Setzer Orchestra	Flamenco	9	8	17	25.11%	Safe

Save Me skates

1. Kyran & Nina: "Chasing Cars"—Snow Patrol
2. Zaraah & Andy: "Don't Cry for Me Argentina"—Julie Covington

Judges' votes to save

- Barber: Kyran & Nina
- Roberts: Kyran & Nina
- Gardiner: Zaraah & Andy
- Cousins: Kyran & Nina

=== Week 5 (2 February) ===
- Theme: The duel
- Group performance: "Bring Me to Life" (performed by professional skaters)
- Duel pairs:
  - Ray & Maria vs. Suzanne & Matt
  - Bonnie & Andrei vs. Gareth & Brianne
  - Beth & Łukasz vs. Hayley & Daniel
  - Sam & Vicky vs. Kyran & Nina

Order	Couple	Judges' votes				Song	Points	Public vote	Result
Order	Couple	Cousins	Barber	Roberts	Gardiner	Song	Points	Public vote	Result
1	Sam & Vicky					"Beat It"—Michael Jackson	1	11.85%	Bottom two
1	Kyran & Nina					"Beat It"—Michael Jackson	–	–	Immune
2	Bonnie & Andrei					"Things"—Robbie Williams feat. Jane Horrocks	2	17.07%	Eliminated
2	Gareth & Brianne					"Things"—Robbie Williams feat. Jane Horrocks	—	—	Immune
3	Beth & Łukasz					"Fighter"—Christina Aguilera	4	39.52%	Safe
3	Hayley & Dan					"Fighter"—Christina Aguilera	—	—	Immune
4	Ray & Maria					"Dead Ringer for Love"—Meat Loaf	—	—	Immune
4	Suzanne & Matt					"Dead Ringer for Love"—Meat Loaf	3	30.93%	Safe

After the duels the four skaters who were not immune all performed again:

1. Sam & Vicky: "Dream Catch Me"—Newton Faulkner
2. Bonnie & Andrei: "Devil Gate Drive"—Suzi Quatro
3. Beth & Łukasz: "Think"—Aretha Franklin
4. Suzanne & Matt: "I Knew You Were Trouble"—Taylor Swift

Save Me skates

1. Sam & Vicky: "Don't Stop the Music"—Jamie Cullum
2. Bonnie & Andrei: "Big Spender"—from Sweet Charity

Judges' votes to save

- Barber: Sam & Vicky
- Roberts: Sam & Vicky
- Gardiner: Sam & Vicky
- Cousins: Did not need to vote but would have saved Sam & Vicky

=== Week 6 (9 February) ===
- Theme: 1984 night
- Group performance: "Dr. Beat"—Miami Sound Machine/"Wild Boys"—Duran Duran
- Torvill & Dean performance: "The Power of Love"
- Note: Former judge Nicky Slater replaced Cousins for this week and next week, while Barber acted as head judge

Order	Couple	Judges' scores				Total	Scoreboard	Song	Points			Public vote	Result
Order	Couple	Barber	Slater	Roberts	Gardiner	Total	Scoreboard	Song	Judges	Public	Total	Public vote	Result
1	Suzanne & Matt	8.5	7.5	8.5	8.0	32.5	5th	"Let's Hear It for the Boy"—Deniece Williams	3	3	6	7.33%	Safe
2	Sam & Vicky	8.0	8.0	8.0	7.5	31.5	6th	"Radio Ga Ga"—Queen	2	1	3	5.27%	Bottom two
3	Gareth & Brianne	7.5	6.5	7.5	7.5	29.0	7th	"Freedom"—Wham!	1	4	5	8.59%	Eliminated
4	Hayley & Dan	9.0	8.5	9.5	9.5	36.5	2nd	"Here Comes the Rain Again"—Eurythmics	6	7	13	27.42%	Safe
5	Ray & Maria	10.0	9.5	10.0	10.0	39.5	1st	"Jump"—Van Halen	7	5	12	19.12%	Safe
6	Kyran & Nina	8.0	8.0	8.5	8.5	33.0	4th	"I Want to Know What Love Is"—Foreigner	4	2	6	5.93%	Safe
7	Beth & Łukasz	9.0	8.0	9.0	8.5	34.5	3rd	"Girls Just Want to Have Fun"—Cyndi Lauper	5	6	11	26.34%	Safe

Save Me skates

1. Sam & Vicky: "Dream Catch Me"—Newton Faulkner
2. Gareth & Brianne: "Beautiful Day"—U2

Judges' votes to save

- Slater: Sam & Vicky
- Roberts: Sam & Vicky
- Gardiner: Sam & Vicky
- Barber: Did not need to vote but would have saved Sam & Vicky

=== Week 7 (16 February) ===
- Theme: Team challenge – to have their individual scores doubled
- Teams:
1. Team Hayley – Hayley, Suzanne and Beth
2. Team Ray – Ray, Kyran and Sam
- Group performances: "Walk Like an Egyptian"—The Bangles (Team Hayley) and "Uptown Girl"—Billy Joel (Team Ray)
- Note: As with last week, Nicky Slater replaced Cousins on the ice panel

Order	Couple	Judges' scores				Total	Song	Group result	Overall score	Scoreboard	Points			Public vote	Result
Order	Couple	Barber	Slater	Roberts	Gardiner	Total	Song	Group result	Overall score	Scoreboard	Judges	Public	Total	Public vote	Result
1	Beth & Łukasz	9.0	8.0	9.0	8.0	34.0	"You Can't Stop the Beat"—from Hairspray	Lose	34.0	6th	1	5	6	28.13%	Safe
2	Hayley & Dan	8.5	8.5	9.0	8.5	34.5	"Skyscraper"—Sam Bailey	Lose	34.5	5th	2	6	8	35.44%	Safe
3	Kyran & Nina	8.0	9.0	8.0	8.0	33.0	"Can't Hold Us"—Macklemore & Ryan Lewis	Won	66.0	3rd	4	1	5	4.53%	Bottom two
4	Suzanne & Matt	10.0	9.0	9.0	9.0	37.0	"Black Velvet"—Alannah Myles	Lose	37.0	4th	3	3	6	10.20%	Eliminated
5	Ray & Maria	10.0	10.0	10.0	10.0	40.0	"Lego House"—Ed Sheeran	Won	80.0	1st	6	4	10	16.54%	Safe
6	Sam & Vicky	9.5	9.5	9.5	8.5	37.0	"Happy"—Pharrell Williams	Won	74.0	2nd	5	2	7	5.15%	Safe

Judges' votes for Team challenge

- Slater: Team Ray
- Roberts: Team Ray
- Gardiner: Team Ray
- Barber: Did not need to vote but would have voted for Team Ray

Save Me skates

1. Kyran & Nina: "Billie Jean"—Michael Jackson
2. Suzanne & Matt: "Music"—Madonna

Judges' votes to save

- Slater: Kyran & Nina
- Roberts: Kyran & Nina
- Gardiner: Kyran & Nina
- Barber: Did not need to vote but would have saved Kyran & Nina

=== Week 8 (23 February) ===
- Theme: Solo skate

Order	Couple	Judges' scores				Total	Grand total	Scoreboard	Song	Points			Public vote	Result
Order	Couple	Cousins	Barber	Roberts	Gardiner	Total	Grand total	Scoreboard	Song	Judges	Public	Total	Public vote	Result
1	Kyran & Nina	8.0	8.0	9.0	9.0	34.0	70.5	=3rd	"I Wanna Be Like You"—Robbie Williams & Olly Murs	3	2	5	5.79%	Eliminated
1	Kyran	9.5	9.5	9.0	8.5	36.5	70.5	=3rd	"Dancing in the Dark"—Bruce Springsteen	3	2	5	5.79%	Eliminated
2	Hayley	7.5	8.0	8.5	7.5	31.5	70.5	=3rd	"Maybe This Time"—Liza Minnelli	3	4	7	29.63%	Safe
2	Hayley & Dan	9.5	9.5	10.0	10.0	39.0	70.5	=3rd	"Conga"—Gloria Estefan	3	4	7	29.63%	Safe
3	Beth & Łukasz	8.5	8.5	8.0	8.0	33.0	65.0	5th	"Burn"—Ellie Goulding	2	5	7	38.12%	Safe
3	Beth	8.0	8.5	8.0	7.5	32.0	65.0	5th	"Man! I Feel Like a Woman!"—Shania Twain	2	5	7	38.12%	Safe
4	Sam	9.0	9.0	9.5	9.0	36.5	74.5	2nd	"Still Got the Blues"—Gary Moore	4	1	5	5.30%	Bottom two
4	Sam & Vicky	9.5	9.5	10.0	9.0	38.0	74.5	2nd	"All of Me"—John Legend	4	1	5	5.30%	Bottom two
5	Ray & Maria	10.0	10.0	10.0	9.5	39.5	79.5	1st	"Counting Stars"—OneRepublic	5	3	8	21.15%	Safe
5	Ray	10.0	10.0	10.0	10.0	40.0	79.5	1st	"Kiss"—Prince	5	3	8	21.15%	Safe

Save Me skates

1. Kyran & Nina: "Chasing Cars"—Snow Patrol
2. Sam & Vicky: "Riverdance"—from Riverdance

Judges' votes to save

- Barber: Sam & Vicky
- Roberts: Sam & Vicky
- Gardiner: Sam & Vicky
- Cousins: Did not need to vote but would have saved Sam & Vicky

=== Week 9 (2 March) ===
- Theme: Flying
- Torvill & Dean performance: "Let's Face the Music and Dance"
- Special musical guest: Kodaline—"High Hopes" (accompanied by professional skaters)

Order	Couple	Judges' scores				Total	Grand total	Scoreboard	Song	Points			Public vote	Result
Order	Couple	Cousins	Barber	Roberts	Gardiner	Total	Grand total	Scoreboard	Song	Judges	Public	Total	Public vote	Result
1	Sam & Vicky	9.0	9.0	9.0	9.5	36.5	72.5	4th	"Let Me Entertain You"—Robbie Williams	1	1	2	7.70%	Eliminated
6	Sam & Vicky	9.0	9.0	9.0	9.0	36.0	72.5	4th	"In the Air Tonight"—Phil Collins	1	1	2	7.70%	Eliminated
2	Hayley & Dan	10.0	10.0	10.0	10.0	40.0	79.0	1st	"How Long Will I Love You?"—Ellie Goulding	4	4	8	35.81%	Safe
5	Hayley & Dan	9.5	9.5	10.0	10.0	39.0	79.0	1st	"Boogie Woogie Bugle Boy"—The Andrews Sisters	4	4	8	35.81%	Safe
3	Beth & Łukasz	9.0	9.5	9.0	9.0	36.5	73.5	3rd	"Dog Days Are Over"—Florence and the Machine	2	3	5	34.71%	Safe
8	Beth & Łukasz	9.5	9.5	9.0	9.0	37.0	73.5	3rd	"Reach"—Gloria Estefan	2	3	5	34.71%	Safe
4	Ray & Maria	8.5	9.5	10.0	9.0	37.0	77.0	2nd	"Arthur's Theme"—Christopher Cross	3	2	5	21.78%	Bottom two
7	Ray & Maria	10.0	10.0	10.0	10.0	40.0	77.0	2nd	"Let Her Go"—Passenger	3	2	5	21.78%	Bottom two

Save Me skates

1. Sam & Vicky: "Club Can't Handle Me"—Flo Rida
2. Ray & Maria: "You Make It Real"—James Morrison

Judges' votes to save

- Barber: Ray & Maria
- Roberts: Ray & Maria
- Gardiner: Ray & Maria
- Cousins: Did not need to vote but would have saved Ray & Maria

=== Week 10: Final (9 March) ===
- Themes: Showcase, Favourite skate; Boléro
- Torvill & Dean performance: "Boléro"

Order	Couple	Judges' scores				Total	Grand total	Scoreboard	Song	Public vote	Boléro	Result
Order	Couple	Cousins	Barber	Roberts	Gardiner	Total	Grand total	Scoreboard	Song	Public vote	Boléro	Result
1	Beth & Łukasz	10.0	10.0	10.0	10.0	40.0	79.5	=2nd	"Run the World (Girls)"—Beyoncé	22.48%	—	Third place
1	Beth & Łukasz	10.0	10.0	10.0	9.5	39.5	79.5	=2nd	"Hey Brother"—Avicii	22.48%	—	Third place
2	Hayley & Dan	10.0	10.0	10.0	10.0	40.0	79.5	=2nd	"Perhaps, Perhaps, Perhaps"—The Pussycat Dolls	33.21%	43.63%	Runners-up
2	Hayley & Dan	9.5	10.0	10.0	10.0	39.5	79.5	=2nd	"Jai Ho! (You Are My Destiny)"—The Pussycat Dolls & A.R Rahman	33.21%	43.63%	Runners-up
3	Ray & Maria	10.0	10.0	10.0	10.0	40.0	80.0	1st	"Surfin' U.S.A"—The Beach Boys	44.31%	56.37%	Winners
3	Ray & Maria	10.0	10.0	10.0	10.0	40.0	80.0	1st	"Malagueña"—The Brian Setzer Orchestra	44.31%	56.37%	Winners

== Ratings ==
Official ratings are taken from BARB.

Episode	Date	Total viewers (millions)	Share
Live show 1	5 January	7.19	26.5%
Live results 1	5 January	5.60	20.3%
Live show 2	12 January	6.72	25.9%
Live results 2	12 January	5.92	19.4%
Live show 3	19 January	6.35	25.0%
Live results 3	19 January	5.18	17.3%
Live show 4	26 January	6.60	23.3%
Live results 4	26 January	5.35	17.4%
Live show 5	2 February	6.14	24.8%
Live results 5	2 February	4.89	15.9%
Live show 6	9 February	5.95	22.9%
Live results 6	9 February	4.79	15.7%
Live show 7	16 February	5.61	21.2%
Live results 7	16 February	4.94	16.0%
Live show 8	23 February	6.17	24.7%
Live results 8	23 February	5.18	16.9%
Live show 9	2 March	6.24	25.4%
Live results 9	2 March	5.03	18.5%
Live final	9 March	6.95	24.1%
Series average	2014	5.93	21.1
