= Matt Evers =

American figure skater (born 1976)

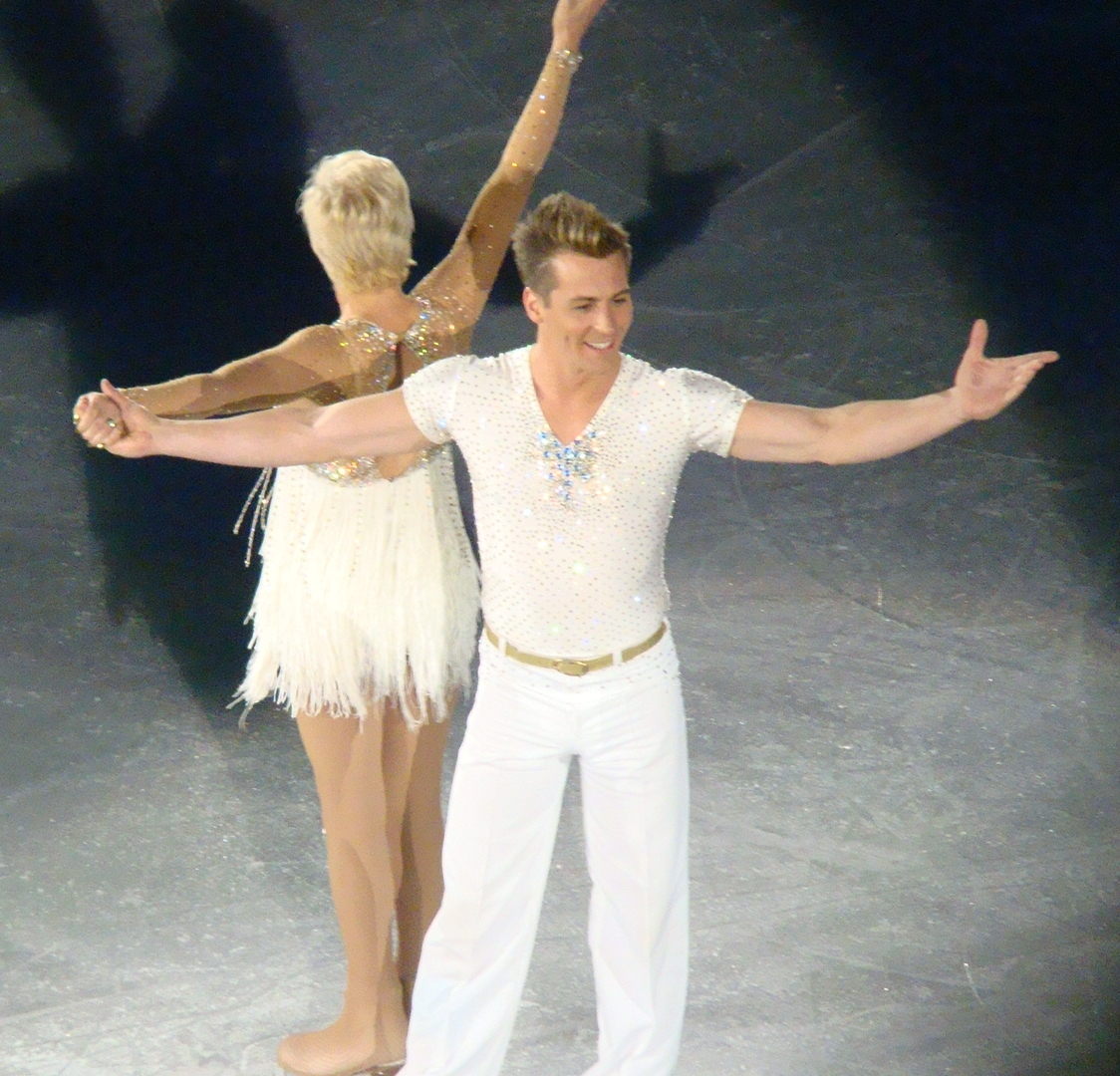
- Evers and Denise Welch on the Dancing on Ice tour in 2011

Personal information
- Born: Matthew Evers; March 16, 1976 (age 50) Saint Paul, Minnesota, U.S.

Figure skating career
- Began skating: 1995

Matt Evers (born March 16, 1976) is an American pair skater, model and actor. He is the 1998 U.S. Junior champion, and was a professional skater on the ITV series Dancing on Ice as well as a television host for Travel Channel UK and Food Network UK. (2006–2023).

== Career ==
With his partner Heather Allebach, Evers won the Junior pairs title at the 1998 U.S. Championships. The following season, they competed at three senior international events, 1998 Skate Canada International, 1998 Cup of Russia and 1998 Nebelhorn Trophy. He quit competing and moved to Los Angeles where he worked for a number of years before receiving an invitation to join Dancing on Ice. Evers also hosted a winter Olympic sport series for Travel Channel as well as two series for Food Network UK, "Made with Love" co-host by Lottie Duncan and "Matt's Summer BBQ".

=== Results ===
Pair skating with Allebach:

Results
International
Event	1995–1996	1996–1997	1997–1998	1998–1999
GP Skate Canada				7th
GP Cup of Russia				8th
Nebelhorn Trophy				5th
National
U.S. Championships	13th J.	9th J.	1st J.	
GP = Grand Prix; J. = Junior level

=== Dancing on Ice ===
Evers is best known for being as a professional skater on the ITV series Dancing on Ice, appearing from the show's inception in 2006 until he announced his departure in 2023. Evers remains the show's longest serving professional.

Evers' statistics
Series	Celebrity Partner	Place
1 (2006)	Bonnie Langford	3rd
2 (2007)	Lisa Scott-Lee	6th
3 (2008)	Suzanne Shaw	1st
4 (2009)	Zöe Salmon	5th
5 (2010)	Heather Mills	10th
6 (2011)	Denise Welch	6th
7 (2012)	Jorgie Porter	2nd
8 (2013)	Pamela Anderson	12th
9 (2014)	Suzanne Shaw	6th
10 (2018)	Candice Brown	12th
11 (2019)	Gemma Collins	8th
12 (2020)	Ian "H" Watkins	7th
13 (2021)	Denise van Outen	13th
13 (2021)	Faye Brookes	2nd
14 (2022)	Sally Dynevor	7th
15 (2023)	Patsy Palmer	8th

== Filmography ==
Year	Title	Role	Notes
2000	Sleepy Hollow High	Jay	Film
2006–2023	Dancing on Ice	Himself	Professional skater
2007	Blades of Glory	Skate Tree	Film
2018	Kidding	Ice Ennui	1 episode
2019	Gemma Collins: Diva Forever	Himself	Guest appearance

== Personal life ==
Evers, who was married to a woman previously, came out as gay in January 2018 in an interview with Attitude magazine. He said it was partly the death of his uncle from AIDS and the presidency of Donald Trump that resulted in his decision to announce his sexuality publicly, saying: "I live my life by example, and I want to show young people that what you feel or how you were born isn't something bad."

Preceded by Kyran Bracken and Melanie Lambert	Dancing on Ice Champion (with partner Suzanne Shaw); Series 3 (2008)	Succeeded by Ray Quinn and Maria Filippov
