= Secret Dealers =

- Presented by: Kate Bliss (2010–2011)
- Voices of: OJ Borg (2012); Zaraah Abrahams (2013–2015)
- Country of origin: United Kingdom
- Original language: English
- No. of series: 5
- No. of episodes: 130

Production
- Running time: 60 minutes (inc. adverts)
- Production company: RDF Television West

Original release
- Network: ITV
- Release: 27 September 2010 – 2 January 2015

Related
- Antiques Roadshow; Dickinson's Real Deal; Flog It!

Secret Dealers is a factual game show that aired on ITV from 27 September 2010 to 2 January 2015. Presenters were Alison Chapman, Karen Dalmeny, David Ford, Mark Stevens, Tim Hogard.

== Format ==
The shows are recorded with members of the public in their homes. Homeowners have to choose between sentimental attachment and money offers for their possessions. Three antiques dealers go into their homes to bid for items they want to buy. Independent valuers put an estimate on how much they think the items are worth. This figure is revealed to the seller and the audience at home. Items are found by the dealers, who make their own valuation and try to purchase them by placing a cash offer on items around the home and give some advice or information on the Antiques. The bids are left in sealed envelopes next to the desired items and the offers are kept secret from fellow dealers until the homeowners opens them. From series three the Dealers would come together with the homeowners to reveal the bids and were now allowed to revise offers by upping their bid when the homeowners sees their offer. The seller then decides whether to accept or decline the deal. If they think it is worth more it will often end in a bidding war to see what dealer will pay the best price and take the item.

The show was revamped for series 3 with dramatic music and new titles with the presenter role dropped and a change in the format. In the first and second series the presenter would be present with the home owner and a choice would be given to accept or decline with the occasional option for the dealers to appear and up there bids. As the presenter role was dropped this part of the show was altered. The dealers would now come face to face with the home owner after the bids are placed. Each of the dealers bids are then revealed for the particular item. The dealers then have a chance to up there price going head to head against each other until the best offer is given. Another notable difference from 3 included several dealers dropped; leaving the eight most popular as chosen by members of the public.

=== The Dealers ===
- Alison Chapman
- Karen Dalmeny
- David Ford
- Tim Hogarth
- Mike Melody
- Simon Schneider
- Christopher Selkirk
- Mark Stevens
- Brenda Haller
- James Layte
- David Hakeney

== Transmissions ==
| Series | Start date | End date | Episodes |
|---|---|---|---|
| 1 | 27 September 2010 | 8 October 2010 | 10 |
| 2 | 6 June 2011 | 15 July 2011 | 30 |
| 3 | 9 July 2012 | 31 August 2012 | 30 |
| 4 | 22 July 2013 | 30 August 2013 | 30 |
| 5 | 17 November 2014 | 2 January 2015 | 30 |

== Awards ==
| Year | Group | Award | Result | References |
|---|---|---|---|---|
| 2010 | Royal Television Society | Best Factual | Nominated | |
| 2011 | Royal Television Society | Best Factual | Nominated | |
| 2015 | National Reality Television Awards | Best Factual | Nominated | |
| 2016 | National Reality Television Awards | Best Factual | Nominated | |
