= Maria Filippov =

Bulgarian ice skater

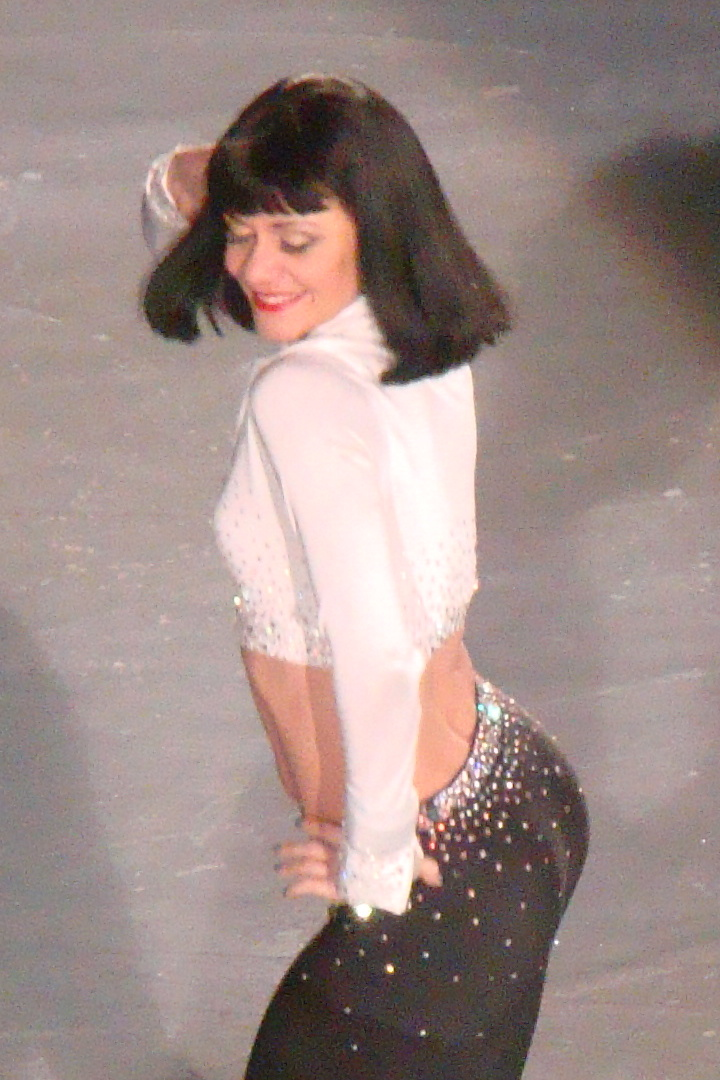
- Born: 20 June 1973 (age 51)

Figure skating career
- Country: Bulgaria
- Retired: 1992 (competitive skating)

Maria Filippov (born 20 June 1973 as Maria Hadjiiska) (Bulgarian: Мария Хаджийска) is a Bulgarian professional ice skater and former competitor.

== Career ==
As Maria Hadjiiska, she was a member of the Bulgarian national ice dancing team from 1988 to 1992 and her country's national ice dance champion in 1990–1991. She represented Bulgaria with her partner Hristo Nikolov at the 1991 European Championships from which they withdrew, and the 1991 World Championships, where they were unable to reach the final.

Filippov coaches at Dundonald International Ice Bowl, Northern Ireland (2017–2023).

== Dancing on Ice ==
Series	Celebrity partner	Place
2	Duncan James	3rd
3	Gareth Gates	4th
4	Ray Quinn	1st
5	Gary Lucy	2nd
6	Craig McLachlan	DNQ
7	Andy Akinwolere	15th
8	Shayne Ward	8th
9	Ray Quinn	1st

=== Series two ===
In 2007 Filippov appeared on the British television programme Dancing on Ice as the partner of singer Duncan James. They came third.

=== Series three ===
In 2008 Filippov appeared on Dancing on Ice partnered by singer Gareth Gates. They were voted out in week nine (the semi-finals).

=== Series four ===
In 2009 Filippov was partnered with X Factor runner-up Ray Quinn, and in week one they were at the top of the leaderboard with 23.5 (out of a possible 30) points. In week five of the competition the couple scored 26.5 points out of a possible 30. In week six of the competition Filippov and Quinn scored 30 points, the first highest score of the series and the earliest perfect score to be awarded in any series. Filippov and Quinn were announced as the winners in the final on 22 March in which they gained a maximum score of 30 for both of their performances.

=== Series five ===
In 2010 Filippov was partnered with former The Bill actor Gary Lucy. They made it to the final, after beating Danniella Westbrook and Matthew Gonzalez in the semi-final skate-off. They came second to Hayley Tamaddon in both the scores and the final result.

=== Series six ===
For 2011 Filippov was partnered with Craig McLachlan, but was eliminated in the second qualifying week along with Elen Rivas and Łukasz Różycki.

=== Series seven ===
In the 2012 series Maria was partnered with former Blue Peter presenter Andy Akinwolere. They were eliminated in the first week.

=== Series eight ===
Filippov partnered X Factor winner Shayne Ward for 2013. They were voted off in week 5, finishing 8th overall.

=== Series nine ===
In the All-Stars series in 2014, Filippov was reunited with series 4 partner Ray Quinn.

== Torvill and Dean's Dancing on Ice ==
Filippov took part in the Australian version of Dancing on Ice with model Jake Wall, which they won.

== Personal life ==
Maria Filippov was married to the late Andrei Filippov and has a son, Anton.

Preceded by Suzanne Shaw and Matt Evers	Dancing on Ice Champion (with partner Ray Quinn); Series 4 (2009)	Succeeded by Hayley Tamaddon and Daniel Whiston
