= Zaraah Abrahams =

English actress (born 1987)

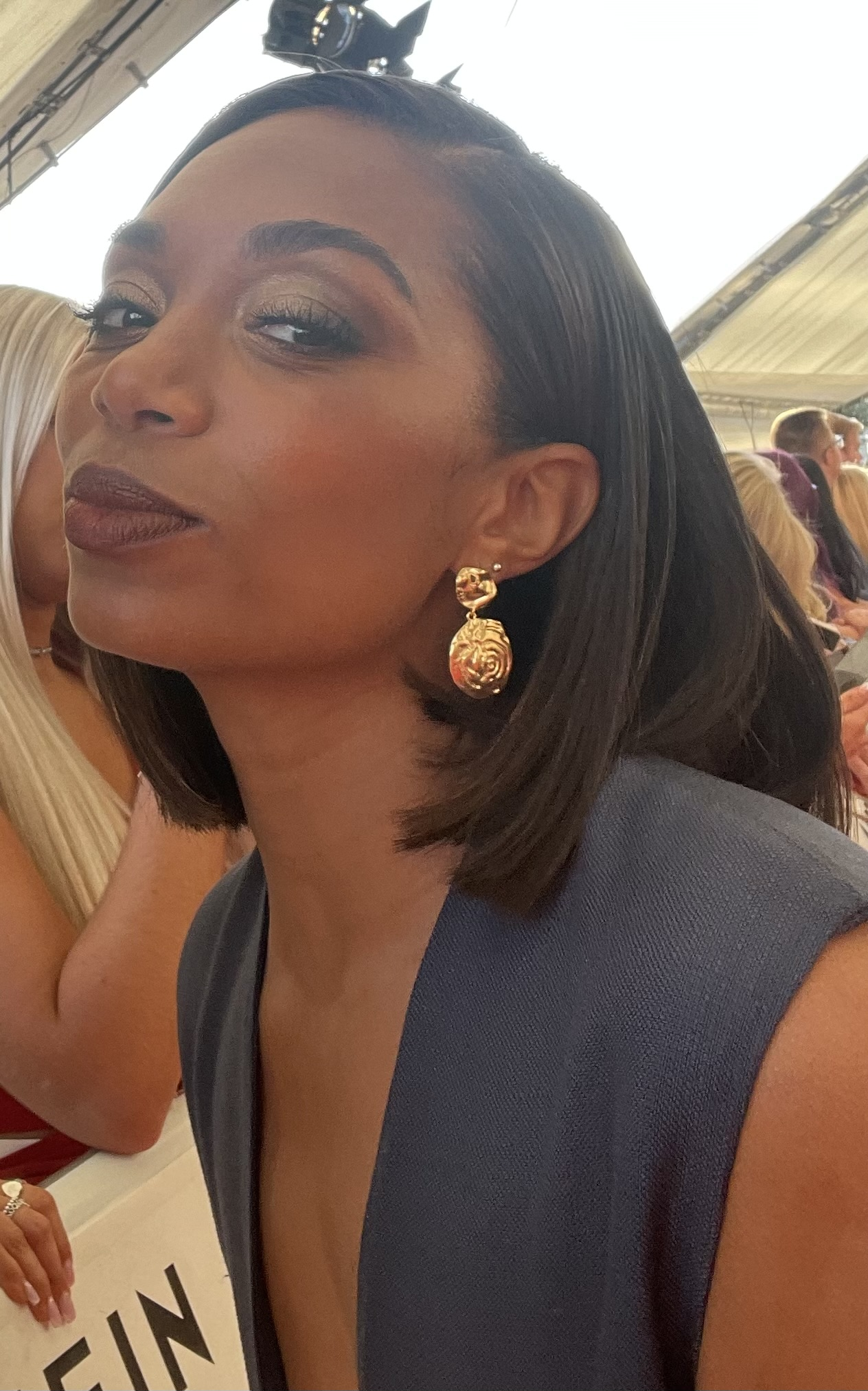
- Abrahams in 2024
- Born: Zaraah Clover Abrahams; 7 January 1987 (age 39); Lambeth, London, England
- Education: Italia Conti Academy of Theatre Arts
- Occupations: Actress; voiceover artist
- Years active: 2002–present
- Television: Girls in Love (2003–2005); Coronation Street (2005–2007); Waterloo Road (2008–2010); Dancing on Ice (2008, 2014); EastEnders (2020–present)

Zaraah Clover Abrahams (born 7 January 1987) is an English actress and voiceover artist. She is known for her roles as Magda in Girls in Love from 2003 to 2005, Michaela White in the BBC school-based drama series Waterloo Road from 2008 to 2010, Joanne Jackson in the ITV soap opera Coronation Street from 2005 to 2007 and Chelsea Fox in the BBC soap opera EastEnders from 2020 onwards. She has also competed in the third series of the ITV talent show Dancing on Ice, and later returned as a contestant for the "All Stars" series in 2014.

== Early life ==
Abrahams was born in a hospital in Lambeth, London of Iraqi and Barbadian descent on her mother's side and of Jamaican descent on her father's side. She grew up in Brixton, South London and is the eldest of three siblings. She attended the Italia Conti Academy of Theatre Arts for her secondary education, landing the role of Magda in the TV Adaptation of Jacqueline Wilson's Girls in Love while still a pupil there. At the age of 17, she left London to pursue a career in acting in Manchester after landing the role of Joanne Jackson in Coronation Street.

== Career ==
Abrahams starred as Magda in the CITV show Girls in Love from 2003 to 2005 and as Joanne Jackson in the ITV soap Coronation Street from 2005 to 2007. In 2008, Abrahams participated in the third series of ITV's celebrity skating series Dancing on Ice, joining the series late in week 3, as a replacement for the injured Michael Underwood who had been forced to withdraw. Her partner was skater Fred Palascak. The pair landed in the skate-off four times, ultimately winning them all and reached the final, before finishing in third place. The same year, she joined the cast of Waterloo Road in a recurring role as student Michaela White, which she played until 2010. The character became part of the core cast for the fourth series in 2009 and remained with the show until her exit at the end of the fifth series in 2010. She starred in the 2013 short film Black Girl in Paris on HBO which was nominated for short film of the year, and where she was seen by Spike Lee. In 2014, Lee cast her as the female lead, Ganja Hightower in the Ganja & Hess homage Da Sweet Blood of Jesus, in her first Hollywood film debut.

In 2014, she returned for the "All Stars" series of Dancing on Ice, this time paired with Andy Buchanan and was sixth to be eliminated in week 4. In 2015, she joined the cast of the Cinemax series The Knick, a medical drama directed by Steven Soderbergh, set around a New York hospital in the early 20th century. She portrayed the role of Opal. In October 2020, it was announced that Abrahams would be taking over from Tiana Benjamin in the role of Chelsea Fox in the BBC soap opera EastEnders. Her first episode as the character was broadcast on 25 December 2020.

== Filmography ==
Year	Title	Role	Notes
2003–2005	Girls in Love	Magda	Main cast
2005–2007	Coronation Street	Joanne Jackson	214 episodes
2008–2010	Waterloo Road	Michaela White	Recurring (Series 3), Main cast (Series 4–5)
2008	Dancing on Ice	Herself	Contestant; series 3
2009	Hole in the Wall	Herself	Contestant
2011	Waterloo Road Reunited	Michaela White	Main cast (web series)
2012	Payback Season	Clarissa	Film
2012	Scott & Bailey	Daysha Kaye	1 episode
2012	Bedlam	Laura	Episode: "The Long Drop"
2013	Black Girl in Paris	Luce	Short film
2013–2015	Secret Dealers	Narrator	Game show (Series 4–5)
2014	Dancing on Ice	Herself	Contestant; series 9
2014	Da Sweet Blood of Jesus	Ganja Hightower	Film
2014	Holby City	Alisa Cole	Episode: "Captive"
2015	The Knick	Opal Edwards	Main cast (Season 2)
2020–present	EastEnders	Chelsea Fox	Regular role
2021	The Bay	DS Emma Ryan	2 episodes

== Awards and nominations ==
Year	Award	Category	Result	Ref.
2021	Inside Soap Awards	Best Newcomer	Nominated	
2022	2022 British Soap Awards	Best Leading Performer	Nominated	
2022	27th National Television Awards	Serial Drama Performance	Nominated	
2022	Inside Soap Awards	Best Actress	Nominated	
2022	Digital Spy Reader Awards	Best Soap Actor (Female)	Second	
