= Dancing on Ice series 5 =

Fifth series of Dancing on Ice

Dancing on Ice
- Series 5
- Presented by: Phillip Schofield; Holly Willoughby
- Judges: Karen Barber; Emma Bunton; Robin Cousins; Jason Gardiner; Nicky Slater
- Celebrity winner: Hayley Tamaddon
- Professional winner: Daniel Whiston
- No. of episodes: 23

Release
- Original network: ITV
- Original release: 10 January – 28 March 2010

Series chronology
- ← Previous; Series 4 Next → Series 6

The fifth series of Dancing on Ice aired from 10 January to 28 March 2010, on ITV, with a preview show on 8 January 2010.

Phillip Schofield and Holly Willoughby returned as the main presenters, while Karen Barber, Robin Cousins, Jason Gardiner, and Nicky Slater returned to the "Ice Panel". Emma Bunton joined the panel as a replacement for Ruthie Henshall. Barber acted as head judge for weeks 6 and 7 due to Cousins commentating on the 2010 Winter Olympics in Vancouver, with Michael Ball and Angela Rippon appearing as guest judges those weeks. This was the last series to feature Slater as a full-time judge, though he returned as a guest judge for two weeks in the ninth series in 2014.

For this series only, a spin-off show aired on Friday evenings on ITV, called Dancing on Ice: Friday. It was presented by Ben Shephard and Coleen Nolan.

The series was won by former Emmerdale actress Hayley Tamaddon and Daniel Whiston. The Bill actor Gary Lucy and Maria Filippov finished in second place, while Hollyoaks actor Kieron Richardson and Brianne Delcourt finished in third.

== Couples ==
Celebrity	Notability	Professional partner	Status
Sinitta	Pop singer & aide to Simon Cowell	Andrei Lipanov	Eliminated 1st on 10 January 2010
Bobby Davro	Comedian & impressionist	Molly Moenkhoff	Eliminated 2nd on 17 January 2010
Jeremy Sheffield	Holby City actor	Susie Lipanova	Eliminated 3rd on 24 January 2010
Tana Ramsay	Cookbook author & television presenter	Stuart Widdall	Eliminated 4th on 31 January 2010
Heather Mills	Model & businesswoman	Matt Evers	Eliminated 5th on 7 February 2010
Hilary Jones	General practitioner & television presenter	Alexandra Schauman	Eliminated 6th on 14 February 2010
Sharron Davies	Olympic medley swimmer	Pavel Aubrecht	Eliminated 7th on 21 February 2010
Emily Atack	The Inbetweeners actress	Fred Palascak	Eliminated 8th on 28 February 2010
Mikey Graham	Boyzone singer	Melanie Lambert	Eliminated 9th on 7 March 2010
Danny Young	Coronation Street actor	Frankie Poultney	Eliminated 10th on 14 March 2010
Danniella Westbrook	EastEnders actress	Matthew Gonzalez	Eliminated 11th on 21 March 2010
Kieron Richardson	Hollyoaks actor	Brianne Delcourt	Third place on 28 March 2010
Gary Lucy	The Bill actor	Maria Filippov	Runners-up on 28 March 2010
Hayley Tamaddon	Emmerdale actress	Daniel Whiston	Winners on 28 March 2010

== Scoring chart ==
The highest score each week is indicated in bold green with a dagger (†), while the lowest score each week is indicated in italicized red with a double-dagger (‡).

Color key:

Winners
Runners-up
Third place
Bottom two
Eliminated

Dancing on Ice (series 5) - Weekly scores
Couple	Pl.	Week											
Couple	Pl.	1	2	3	4	5	6	7	8	9	10	11	12
Hayley & Daniel	1st	**19.5**†	—N/a	**19.5**†	**23.0**†	**21.0**†	**26.0**†	**26.0**†	**25.5**†	**30.0**†	26.5	**27.5**†	29.0+30.0=**59.0**† (Note: This couple finished in first place.)
Gary & Maria	2nd	—N/a	17.5 (Note: This couple was in the bottom two, but was not eliminated.)	18.5	19.0	18.5	21.0	22.5	21.0	20.5	22.0‡	24.5	24.5+25.0=49.5 (Note: This couple finished in second place.)
Kieron & Brianne	3rd	—N/a	17.5	16.0	15.0	16.0	19.5	19.5	18.5	21.0	23.0	23.0‡	24.0+24.5=48.5‡ (Note: This couple finished in third place.)
Danniella & Matthew	4th	17.0	—N/a	18.0	19.5	20.0	20.0	24.0	22.0	19.5	**27.5**†	23.0‡ (Note: This couple was eliminated.)	
Danny & Frankie	5th	—N/a	**18.0**†	17.0	17.0	17.0	17.0	17.0	22.0	22.5	25.5		
Mikey & Melanie	6th	—N/a	16.0	18.5	20.5	15.0	18.5	18.5	13.5‡	19.0‡			
Emily & Fred	7th	11.0‡	—N/a	13.5	10.5‡	15.0	13.5	17.5	18.5				
Sharron & Pavel	8th	12.5	—N/a	14.0	15.0	16.5	15.0	16.0‡					
Dr. Hilary & Alexandra	9th	—N/a	11.5	7.5‡	11.5	11.5‡	12.0‡						
Heather & Matt	10th	15.5	—N/a	16.0	12.5	15.0							
Tana & Stuart	11th	12.5	—N/a	12.5	12.0								
Jeremy & Susie	12th	—N/a	12.5	12.0									
Bobby & Molly	13th	—N/a	10.5‡										
Sinitta & Andrei	14th	15.0											

== Weekly scores ==
=== Week 1 (10 January) ===
Only the female celebrities skated this week. Couples are listed in the order they performed.

Couple	Judges' scores					Total score	Music	Public vote	Points			Result
Couple	Barber	Slater	Gardiner	Bunton	Cousins	Total score	Music	Public vote	Judges	Public	Total	Result
Danniella & Matthew	3.5	3.5	3.0	3.5	3.5	17.0	"Evacuate the Dancefloor" — Cascada	10.9%	6	3	9	Safe
Tana & Stuart	3.0	2.0	2.0	3.0	2.5	12.5	"Take My Breath Away" — Berlin	14.3%	3	5	8	Safe
Hayley & Daniel	4.0	4.0	3.5	4.0	4.0	19.5	"Shake a Tail Feather" — Ike & Tina Turner	34.0%	7	7	14	Safe
Sharron & Pavel	3.0	3.0	1.5	2.5	2.5	12.5	"Search for the Hero" — M People	6.5%	3	1	4	Bottom two
Emily & Fred	2.5	2.0	2.0	2.0	2.5	11.0	"Love Story" — Taylor Swift	14.4%	2	6	8	Safe
Sinitta & Andrei	3.5	3.0	2.5	3.0	3.0	15.0	"Halo" — Beyoncé	7.6%	4	2	6	Eliminated
Heather & Matt	3.0	4.0	2.5	3.0	3.0	15.5	"Conga" — Gloria Estefan	12.5%	5	4	9	Safe

Judges' votes to save

- Barber: Sharron & Pavel
- Slater: Sharron & Pavel
- Gardiner: Sharron & Pavel
- Bunton: Sinitta & Andrei
- Cousins: Sharron & Pavel

=== Week 2 (17 January) ===
Only the male celebrities skated this week. Couples are listed in the order they performed.

Couple	Judges' scores					Total score	Music	Public vote	Points			Result
Couple	Barber	Slater	Gardiner	Bunton	Cousins	Total score	Music	Public vote	Judges	Public	Total	Result
Gary & Maria	4.0	3.5	3.0	3.5	3.5	17.5	"All Right Now" — Free	9.0%	6	1	7	Bottom two
Dr. Hilary & Alexandra	2.5	2.0	2.0	2.5	2.5	11.5	"Everlasting Love" — Love Affair	10.4%	3	5	8	Safe
Danny & Frankie	3.5	4.0	3.0	4.0	3.5	18.0	"Viva la Vida" — Coldplay	9.5%	7	2	9	Safe
Bobby & Molly	2.0	2.5	2.0	2.0	2.0	10.5	"Got My Mind Set on You" — George Harrison	10.2%	2	4	6	Eliminated
Kieron & Brianne	4.0	4.5	2.5	3.5	3.0	17.5	"Beat Again" — JLS	10.0%	6	3	9	Safe
Jeremy & Susie	2.5	2.5	2.0	3.0	2.5	12.5	"It's a Man's Man's Man's World" — Seal	18.1%	4	6	10	Safe
Mikey & Melanie	3.5	3.5	2.5	3.5	3.0	16.0	"Let's Dance" — David Bowie	32.8%	5	7	12	Safe

Judges' votes to save

- Barber: Gary & Maria
- Slater: Gary & Maria
- Gardiner: Gary & Maria
- Bunton: Gary & Maria
- Cousins: Gary & Maria

=== Week 3 (24 January) ===
Required element: Pair spiral

Couples are listed in the order they performed.

Couple	Judges' scores					Total score	Music	Public vote	Points			Result
Couple	Barber	Slater	Gardiner	Bunton	Cousins	Total score	Music	Public vote	Judges	Public	Total	Result
Hayley & Daniel	4.5	3.0	4.0	4.0	4.0	19.5	"You're No Good" — Linda Ronstadt	17.6%	12	10	22	Safe
Dr. Hilary & Alexandra	2.0	1.0	1.5	1.5	1.5	7.5	"Close to You" — The Carpenters	6.3%	3	8	11	Safe
Emily & Fred	2.5	2.0	2.5	3.5	3.0	13.5	"Beautiful" — Christina Aguilera	4.3%	6	5	11	Safe
Kieron & Brianne	3.5	2.5	3.0	3.5	3.5	16.0	"Evergreen" — Westlife	4.0%	8	4	12	Safe
Tana & Stuart	3.0	2.0	2.0	3.0	2.5	12.5	"Piece of My Heart" — Beverley Knight	4.0%	5	3	8	Safe
Danny & Frankie	4.0	3.0	3.0	3.5	3.5	17.0	"Devil in Disguise" — Elvis Presley	5.9%	9	7	16	Safe
Heather & Matt	3.5	2.5	3.0	3.5	3.5	16.0	"Frozen" — Madonna	5.2%	8	6	14	Safe
Gary & Maria	4.0	3.5	3.5	3.5	4.0	18.5	"I'm Yours" — Jason Mraz	20.1%	11	12	23	Safe
Sharron & Pavel	3.5	2.5	2.5	2.5	3.0	14.0	"These Words" — Natasha Bedingfield	3.1%	7	1	8	Bottom two
Jeremy & Susie	3.0	2.0	2.0	2.5	2.5	12.0	"Stay with Me" — Faces	3.7%	4	2	6	Eliminated
Mikey & Melanie	4.0	3.0	4.0	4.0	3.5	18.5	"Just Say Yes" — Snow Patrol	18.4%	11	11	22	Safe
Danniella & Matthew	4.0	3.5	3.0	4.0	3.5	18.0	"Because of You" — Kelly Clarkson	7.3%	10	9	19	Safe

Judges' votes to save

- Barber: Sharron & Pavel
- Slater: Sharron & Pavel
- Gardiner: Sharron & Pavel
- Bunton: Sharron & Pavel
- Cousins: Sharron & Pavel

=== Week 4 (31 January) ===
Required element: Step combination

Couples are listed in the order they performed.

Couple	Judges' scores					Total score	Music	Public vote	Points			Result
Couple	Barber	Slater	Gardiner	Bunton	Cousins	Total score	Music	Public vote	Judges	Public	Total	Result
Kieron & Brianne	3.0	3.0	3.0	3.0	3.0	15.0	"Play That Funky Music" — Wild Cherry	4.9%	6	4	10	Safe
Tana & Stuart	2.5	2.0	2.5	2.5	2.5	12.0	"Waterloo" — ABBA	3.6%	4	2	6	Eliminated
Danny & Frankie	3.5	3.5	3.5	3.0	3.5	17.0	"When You're in Love with a Beautiful Woman" — Dr Hook	2.5%	7	1	8	Bottom two
Emily & Fred	2.5	1.5	1.5	2.0	3.0	10.5	"Yes Sir, I Can Boogie" — Baccara	5.1%	2	6	8	Safe
Mikey & Melanie	4.0	4.5	4.5	4.0	3.5	20.5	"Cecilia" — Simon & Garfunkel	16.7%	10	10	20	Safe
Heather & Matt	3.0	2.5	2.0	2.5	2.5	12.5	"Best of My Love" — The Emotions	4.8%	5	3	8	Safe
Dr. Hilary & Alexandra	2.5	2.5	2.0	2.0	2.5	11.5	"Sweet Caroline" — Neil Diamond	7.4%	3	7	10	Safe
Danniella & Matthew	4.0	3.5	4.0	4.0	4.0	19.5	"Le Freak" — Chic	5.0%	9	5	14	Safe
Sharron & Pavel	3.5	3.5	2.0	3.0	3.0	15.0	"You've Got a Friend" — James Taylor	16.3%	6	9	15	Safe
Gary & Maria	4.0	3.5	4.0	3.5	4.0	19.0	"Easy" — Commodores	12.1%	8	8	16	Safe
Hayley & Daniel	4.5	4.5	4.5	4.5	5.0	23.0	"No More Tears" — Barbra Streisand & Donna Summer	21.6%	11	11	22	Safe

Judges' votes to save

- Barber: Danny & Frankie
- Slater: Danny & Frankie
- Gardiner: Danny & Frankie
- Bunton: Danny & Frankie
- Cousins: Danny & Frankie

=== Week 5 (7 February) ===
Required element: Pairs spin

Couples are listed in the order they performed.

Couple	Judges' scores					Total score	Music	Public vote	Points			Result
Couple	Barber	Slater	Gardiner	Bunton	Cousins	Total score	Music	Public vote	Judges	Public	Total	Result
Gary & Maria	4.0	4.0	3.5	3.5	3.5	18.5	"Good Vibrations" — The Beach Boys	11.3%	8	8	16	Safe
Heather & Matt	2.5	3.5	3.0	3.0	3.0	15.0	"Chain of Fools" — Aretha Franklin	3.3%	4	1	5	Eliminated
Danny & Frankie	3.5	4.0	3.5	3.0	3.0	17.0	"Tiny Dancer" — Elton John	4.0%	7	2	9	Safe
Emily & Fred	3.0	3.0	3.0	3.0	3.0	15.0	"The Sweet Escape" — Gwen Stefani	4.8%	4	4	8	Safe
Mikey & Melanie	3.5	3.5	3.0	2.5	2.5	15.0	"The River of Dreams" — Billy Joel	23.4%	4	9	13	Safe
Sharron & Pavel	3.5	4.0	3.0	3.0	3.0	16.5	"Fast Car" — Mutya Buena	6.8%	6	6	12	Safe
Kieron & Brianne	3.0	3.5	3.0	3.0	3.5	16.0	"Pencil Full of Lead" — Paolo Nutini	4.6%	5	3	8	Bottom two
Hayley & Daniel	4.5	4.5	4.0	4.0	4.0	21.0	"Just Dance" — Lady Gaga	28.6%	10	10	20	Safe
Dr. Hilary & Alexandra	2.0	2.5	2.0	2.5	2.5	11.5	"Truly Madly Deeply" — Savage Garden	7.2%	3	7	10	Safe
Danniella & Matthew	4.0	4.5	3.5	4.0	4.0	20.0	"Dance with Me" — Debelah Morgan	6.0%	9	5	14	Safe

Judges' votes to save

- Barber: Kieron & Brianne
- Slater: Heather & Matt
- Gardiner: Kieron & Brianne
- Bunton: Kieron & Brianne
- Cousins: Kieron & Brianne

=== Week 6 (14 February) ===
Theme: Valentine's Day
Required element: Shadow step sequence

Michael Ball replaced Robin Cousins for the week while he was away commentating at the 2010 Winter Olympics. Couples are listed in the order they performed.

Couple	Judges' scores					Total score	Music	Public vote	Points			Result
Couple	Slater	Bunton	Gardiner	Ball	Barber	Total score	Music	Public vote	Judges	Public	Total	Result
Danniella & Matthew	4.0	4.0	4.0	4.0	4.0	20.0	"You've Got the Love" — Florence and the Machine	4.2%	7	2	9	Safe
Danny & Frankie	3.0	3.5	3.5	3.5	3.5	17.0	"Higher and Higher" — Jackie Wilson	3.2%	4	1	5	Bottom two
Emily & Fred	2.5	2.5	2.5	3.0	3.0	13.5	"Saving All My Love for You" — Whitney Houston	6.3%	2	5	7	Safe
Mikey & Melanie	4.0	3.0	3.5	4.0	4.0	18.5	"Love on a Mountain Top" — Sinitta	16.0%	5	8	13	Safe
Sharron & Pavel	3.5	2.5	2.5	3.0	3.5	15.0	"(We Want) The Same Thing" — Belinda Carlisle	5.8%	3	4	7	Safe
Hayley & Daniel	5.5	5.0	5.5	5.0	5.0	26.0	"Endless Love" — Diana Ross & Lionel Richie	33.1%	9	9	18	Safe
Dr. Hilary & Alexandra	2.0	2.0	2.5	2.5	3.0	12.0	"Higher Love" — Steve Winwood	5.5%	1	3	4	Eliminated
Kieron & Brianne	4.5	3.5	3.5	4.0	4.0	19.5	"Don't Know Much" — Linda Ronstadt	10.7%	6	6	12	Safe
Gary & Maria	5.0	4.0	3.0	4.5	4.5	21.0	"My Cherie Amour" — Stevie Wonder	15.0%	8	7	15	Safe

Judges' votes to save

- Slater: Danny & Frankie
- Bunton: Danny & Frankie
- Gardiner: Danny & Frankie
- Ball: Danny & Frankie
- Barber: Danny & Frankie

=== Week 7 (21 February) ===
Required element: Individual opening and closing position

Angela Rippon replaced Robin Cousins for the week while he was away commentating at the 2010 Winter Olympics. Couples are listed in the order they performed.

Couple	Judges' scores					Total score	Music	Public vote	Points			Result
Couple	Bunton	Slater	Rippon	Gardiner	Barber	Total score	Music	Public vote	Judges	Public	Total	Result
Kieron & Brianne	4.0	4.0	4.0	3.5	4.0	19.5	"Ever Fallen in Love" — Buzzcocks	8.0%	5	5	10	Safe
Sharron & Pavel	3.0	3.5	3.0	3.0	3.5	16.0	"Stay" — Shakespears Sister	3.9%	1	1	2	Eliminated
Danniella & Matthew	4.5	4.5	5.0	5.0	5.0	24.0	"You Don't Have to Say You Love Me" — Dusty Springfield	7.2%	7	4	11	Safe
Danny & Frankie	4.0	2.5	3.5	3.5	3.5	17.0	"Sherry" — Frankie Valli and the Four Seasons	6.5%	2	3	5	Safe
Hayley & Daniel	5.5	5.5	5.5	4.5	5.0	26.0	"Get Happy" — from Summer Stock	31.7%	8	8	16	Safe
Emily & Fred	3.5	3.5	4.0	3.0	3.5	17.5	"Bad Boys" — Alexandra Burke, feat. Flo Rida	5.2%	3	2	5	Bottom two
Gary & Maria	4.5	5.0	4.0	4.5	4.5	22.5	"What About Now" — Daughtry	18.9%	6	7	13	Safe
Mikey & Melanie	4.0	3.0	3.5	4.0	4.0	18.5	"Ring of Fire" — Johnny Cash	18.7%	4	6	10	Safe

Judges' votes to save

- Bunton: Emily & Fred
- Slater: Emily & Fred
- Rippon: Emily & Fred
- Gardiner: Emily & Fred
- Barber: Emily & Fred

=== Week 8 (28 February) ===
Required element: Unassisted jump

Couples are listed in the order they performed.

Couple	Judges' scores					Total score	Music	Public vote	Points			Result
Couple	Barber	Slater	Gardiner	Bunton	Cousins	Total score	Music	Public vote	Judges	Public	Total	Result
Mikey & Melanie	3.0	2.5	2.5	3.0	2.5	13.5	"Dancing in the Dark" — Bruce Springsteen	35.7%	3	7	10	Safe
Danniella & Matthew	5.0	4.5	3.5	4.5	4.5	22.0	"Rose Garden" — Lynn Anderson	4.2%	6	1	7	Bottom two
Kieron & Brianne	4.0	3.5	3.5	4.0	3.5	18.5	"Careless Whisper" — George Michael	9.0%	4	4	8	Safe
Emily & Fred	3.5	4.0	3.0	4.0	4.0	18.5	"Da Doo Ron Ron" — The Crystals	6.1%	4	2	6	Eliminated
Danny & Frankie	4.5	4.5	4.0	4.5	4.5	22.0	"Yeh Yeh" — Georgie Fame and the Blue Flames	6.2%	6	3	9	Safe
Hayley & Daniel	5.5	5.0	5.0	5.0	5.0	25.5	"Don't Stop Believin'" — Journey	25.1%	7	6	13	Safe
Gary & Maria	4.5	4.5	4.0	4.0	4.0	21.0	"The Race" — Yello	13.5%	5	5	10	Safe

Judges' votes to save

- Barber: Danniella & Matthew
- Slater: Emily & Fred
- Gardiner: Danniella & Matthew
- Bunton: Danniella & Matthew
- Cousins: Danniella & Matthew

=== Week 9 (7 March) ===
Theme: Movie week
Required element: Solo spin

Couples are listed in the order they performed.

Couple	Judges' scores					Total score	Music	Film	Public vote	Points			Result
Couple	Barber	Slater	Gardiner	Bunton	Cousins	Total score	Music	Film	Public vote	Judges	Public	Total	Result
Danny & Frankie	4.5	4.5	4.5	4.5	4.5	22.5	"Rocky Theme"	Rocky	5.6	5	2	7	Safe
Danniella & Matthew	4.0	3.5	4.0	4.0	4.0	19.5	"Summer Nights"	Grease	5.2	2	1	3	Bottom two
Mikey & Melanie	4.0	4.0	3.5	4.0	3.5	19.0	"When You Say Nothing at All"	Notting Hill	22.9	1	5	6	Eliminated
Gary & Maria	4.5	5.0	3.0	4.0	4.0	20.5	"You Never Can Tell"	Pulp Fiction	13.7	3	4	7	Safe
Kieron & Brianne	4.0	4.5	4.0	4.5	4.0	21.0	"The Pink Panther Theme"	The Pink Panther	7.9	4	3	7	Safe
Hayley & Daniel	6.0	6.0	6.0	6.0	6.0	30.0	"Jai Ho (You Are My Destiny)"	Slumdog Millionaire	44.8	6	6	12	Safe

Judges' votes to save

- Barber: Danniella & Matthew
- Slater: Mikey & Melanie
- Gardiner: Mikey & Melanie
- Bunton: Danniella & Matthew
- Cousins: Danniella & Matthew

=== Week 10 (14 March) ===
Theme: Prop Week

Couples are listed in the order they performed.

Couple	Judges' scores					Total score	Music	Prop	Public vote	Points			Result
Couple	Barber	Slater	Gardiner	Bunton	Cousins	Total score	Music	Prop	Public vote	Judges	Public	Total	Result
Gary & Maria	4.5	4.5	4.0	4.5	4.5	22.0	"Hit Me with Your Rhythm Stick" — Ian Dury and the Blockheads	Cane	16.4	1	4	5	Safe
Danniella & Matthew	5.5	5.5	5.5	5.5	5.5	27.5	"The Look" — Roxette	Office chair	11.4	5	2	7	Safe
Kieron & Brianne	4.5	4.5	4.5	5.0	4.5	23.0	"The Great Pretender" — The Platters	Microphone stand	12.4	2	3	5	Bottom two
Hayley & Daniel	5.5	5.5	5.0	5.0	5.5	26.5	"Raindrops Keep Fallin' on My Head" — B.J. Thomas	Umbrella	50.3	4	5	9	Safe
Danny & Frankie	5.0	5.0	5.0	5.5	5.0	25.5	"All About You" — McFly	Hat	9.4	3	1	4	Eliminated

Judges' votes to save

- Barber: Danny & Frankie
- Slater: Kieron & Brianne
- Gardiner: Kieron & Brianne
- Bunton: Kieron & Brianne
- Cousins: Kieron & Brianne

=== Week 11: Semifinals (21 March) ===
Required element: Solo Skate

Couples are listed in the order they performed.

Couple	Judges' scores					Total score	Music	Public vote	Points			Result
Couple	Barber	Slater	Gardiner	Bunton	Cousins	Total score	Music	Public vote	Judges	Public	Total	Result
Hayley & Daniel	5.5	5.0	5.5	5.5	6.0	27.5	"In My Life" — Bonnie Tyler	53.8	4	4	8	Safe
Gary & Maria	4.5	5.5	4.5	5.0	5.0	24.5	"You and Me Song" — The Wannadies	17.2	3	2	5	Bottom two
Danniella & Matthew	5.0	4.0	4.5	5.0	4.5	23.0	"When Love Takes Over" — David Guetta, feat. Kelly Rowland	9.3	2	1	3	Eliminated
Kieron & Brianne	5.0	4.5	4.0	5.0	4.5	23.0	"Good Riddance (Time of Your Life)" — Green Day	19.7	2	3	5	Safe

Judges' votes to save

- Barber: Gary & Maria
- Slater: Gary & Maria
- Gardiner: Danniella & Matthew
- Bunton: Danniella & Matthew
- Cousins: Gary & Maria

=== Week 12: Finale (28 March) ===
Required element: Flying

Couples are listed in the order they performed.

Couple	Judges' scores					Total score	Music	Public vote	Boléro	Result
Couple	Barber	Slater	Gardiner	Bunton	Cousins	Total score	Music	Public vote	Boléro	Result
Kieron & Brianne	5.0	4.5	4.5	5.0	5.0	48.5	"One Day Like This" — Elbow	13.1	—N/a	Third place
Kieron & Brianne	5.0	5.0	5.0	5.0	4.5	48.5	"Ever Fallen in Love" — The Buzzcocks	13.1	—N/a	Third place
Hayley & Daniel	6.0	5.5	5.5	6.0	6.0	59.0	"Songbird" — Eva Cassidy	68.7	82.9%	Winners
Hayley & Daniel	6.0	6.0	6.0	6.0	6.0	59.0	"Jai Ho! (You Are My Destiny)" — The Pussycat Dolls	68.7	82.9%	Winners
Gary & Maria	5.0	5.0	4.5	5.0	5.0	49.5	"Starman" — David Bowie	18.1	17.1%	Runners-up
Gary & Maria	5.0	5.5	4.5	5.0	5.0	49.5	"What About Now" — Daughtry	18.1	17.1%	Runners-up

== Ratings ==
Show	Date	Official ITV1 rating (millions)	Weekly rank	Share
Launch show	8 January	7.27	18	22.0%
Live show 1	10 January	9.64	6	30.8%
Results 1	10 January	8.24	14	27.4%
Live show 2	17 January	9.10	8	30.9%
Results 2	17 January	7.61	14	25.9%
Live show 3	24 January	8.95	7	31.3%
Results 3	24 January	6.96	15	24.4%
Live show 4	31 January	8.53	8	30.5%
Results 4	31 January	7.01	15	24.0%
Live show 5	7 February	8.80	7	31.4%
Results 5	7 February	8.03	13	28.9%
Live show 6	14 February	9.00	6	31.4%
Results 6	14 February	7.66	14	29.6%
Live show 7	21 February	8.40	7	28.9%
Results 7	21 February	7.55	12	26.8%
Live show 8	28 February	8.86	6	31.3%
Results 8	28 February	8.07	11	28.9%
Live show 9	7 March	8.77	6	30.8%
Results 9	7 March	7.50	15	28.4%
Live show 10	14 March	8.28	6	30.2%
Results 10	14 March	7.41	13	27.7%
Semifinals	21 March	8.59	5	29.8%
Semifinal results	21 March	7.99	8	27.7%
Live finale	28 March	9.42	4	32.1%

== DVD release ==
Dancing on Ice Series 5 was made available on DVD on 12 April 2010 in the United Kingdom. The DVD only featured highlights from the series, including interviews and previously unseen footage.
