= Doing It My Way =

Ray Quinn

Studio album by Ray Quinn
- Released: 12 March 2007
- Recorded: January 2007; Los Angeles, California
- Genre: Vocal jazz
- Length: 34:05
- Label: Syco
- Producer: Nigel Wright

Ray Quinn chronology
Ray Quinn (2007)	Undeniable (2020)

Professional ratings
Review scores
Source	Rating
AllMusic	3/5 stars

Doing It My Way is the debut studio album by The X Factor series 3 runner up Ray Quinn. The album was recorded at Capitol Records Tower in Los Angeles in January 2007. It was released on 12 March 2007 and entered the UK Albums Chart at number one the following week, making Quinn the first person to have a number-one album without releasing a single. It sold 126,985 copies in its first week, enough to be certified Gold.

== Track listing ==
1. "Ain't That a Kick in the Head?" (Sammy Cahn, Jimmy Van Heusen) - 2:31
2. "Fly Me to the Moon" (Bart Howard) - 2:27
3. "My Way" (Paul Anka, Claude François, Jacques Revaux, Gilles Thibault) - 4:29
4. "That's Life" (Kelly Gordon, Dean Kay) - 3:13
5. "Mack the Knife" (Marc Blitzstein, Bertolt Brecht, Kurt Weill) - 3:02
6. "Smile" (Charlie Chaplin, John Turner, Geoffrey Parsons) - 2:39
7. "The Way You Look Tonight" (Jerome Kern, Dorothy Fields) - 4:11
8. "Summer Wind" (Hans Bradtke, Henry Mayer, Johnny Mercer) - 2:44
9. "What a Wonderful World" (Bob Thiele, George David Weiss) - 2:15
10. "Mr. Bojangles" (Jerry Jeff Walker) - 3:25
11. "New York, New York" (John Kander, Fred Ebb) - 3:09

== Credits and personnel ==
(Credits taken from AllMusic and Doin It My Way's liner notes.)

- Paul Anka - Composer
- David Arch - Orchestration
- John III Baker - Music Preparation
- Dick Beetham - Mastering
- Marc Blitzstein - Composer
- Hans Bradtke - Composer
- Bertolt Brecht - Composer
- Sammy Cahn - Composer
- Paula Chandler - Digital Editing, Engineer
- Fred Ebb - Composer
- Rick Fernandez - Assistant Engineer
- Dorothy Fields - Composer
- Simon Fowler - Photography
- Claude François - Composer
- Kelly Gordon - Composer
- Jimmy Van Heusen - Composer
- Bart Howard - Composer
- John Kander - Composer
- Dean Kay - Composer
- Jerome Kern - Composer
- Henry Mayer - Composer
- Johnny Mercer - Composer
- Bruce Monical - Assistant Engineer
- Joanne Morris - Design
- Geoff Parsons - Composer
- Ray Quinn - Primary Artist
- Eric Rennaker - Assistant Engineer
- Jacques Revaux - Composer
- Robin Sellars - Engineer
- J. Neil Sidwell - Orchestration
- Richard Sidwell - Music Preparation
- Anne Skates - Vocal Arrangement, Vocal Contractor
- Paul "Scooby" Smith - Assistant Engineer
- Gilles Thibault - Composer
- Bob Thiele - Composer
- Aaron Walk - Assistant Engineer
- Jerry Jeff Walker - Composer
- Kurt Weill - Composer
- George David Weiss - Composer
- Nigel Wright - Conductor, Orchestration, Producer

== Charts and certifications ==
=== Weekly charts ===
Chart (2007)	Peak position
Irish Albums (IRMA)	5
Scottish Albums (OCC)	1
UK Albums (OCC)	1
UK Album Downloads (OCC)	12

=== Year-end charts ===
Chart (2007)	Position
UK Albums (OCC)	65

=== Certifications ===
Region	Certification	Certified units/sales
Ireland (IRMA)	Gold	7,500^{^}
United Kingdom (BPI)	Gold	100,000^{*}
^{*} Sales figures based on certification alone.^{^} Shipments figures based on certification alone.
