= Ray Quinn =

English actor, dancer and singer (born 1988)

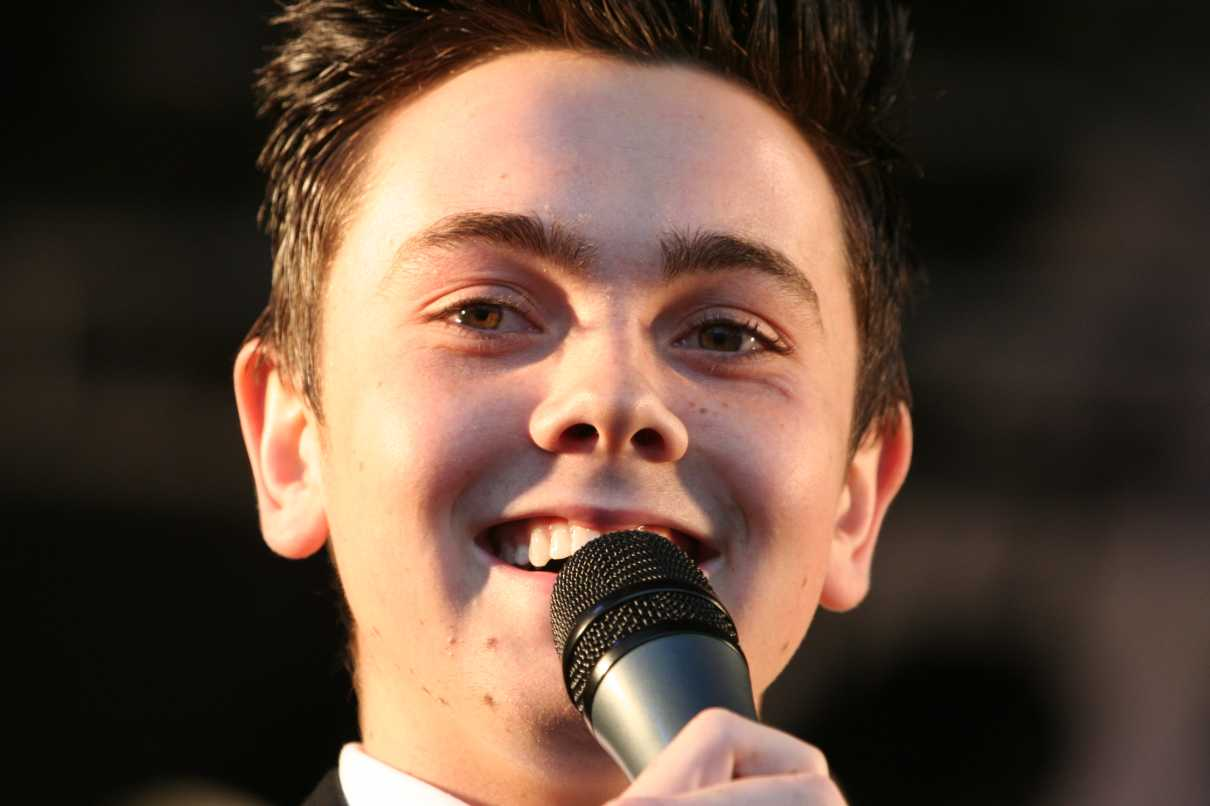
- Quinn in August 2007
- Born: Raymond Arthur Quinn; 25 August 1988 (age 38); Gateacre, Liverpool, England
- Occupations: Actor; singer; dancer
- Years active: 1998–present
- Spouse: Emma Stephens (m. 2012; div. 2015)
- Children: 2
- Musical career
- Genres: Pop; swing
- Years active: 2006–present
- Labels: Sony Music; Syco

Raymond Arthur Quinn (born 25 August 1988) is an English actor, singer, and dancer. He is best known for his role as Anthony Murray in Brookside from 2000 to 2003. He achieved more public recognition when he auditioned for the third series of The X Factor in 2006, finishing in second place behind Leona Lewis.

Quinn won the fourth series of Dancing on Ice in 2009 and the 'All Stars' series in 2014. On 22 February 2015, he was the winner of the first (and only) series of Get Your Act Together.

== Early life ==
Raymond Arthur Quinn was born on 25 August 1988 in Childwall, Merseyside. Later he attended the Merseyside Dance and Drama College, where he had singing lessons from the age of nine. He cites his vocal coach, Suzanne Taylor, as a major influence in his career.

== Career ==
=== 2000–2005: Early Career ===
From 2000 to 2003, Quinn portrayed the victimised and tormented child Anthony Murray in the Channel 4 soap opera Brookside. He performed and was credited as Raymond Quinn. Murray's featured storylines on the programme included bullying and murder.

After his appearance on Brookside ended he guest starred in an episode of Merseybeat in which he played criminal Leon Marsh. He also appeared in the episode "The Singing Cactus" for the BBC series, The Afternoon Play as John Reilly, who grieves after his mother's death and flees into his own world with his "singing cactus".

=== 2006: The X Factor ===
Quinn rose to further prominence when he auditioned for the third series of The X Factor, singing a medley of "Ain't That a Kick in the Head?" and "Devil in Disguise". Prior to appearing on the show, he was a performing arts student at the Merseyside Dance and Drama College, where he previously received some vocal training. He received three yeses from the judges, and progressed through to bootcamp. Quinn was placed in the 16-24s category, with Simon Cowell as his mentor. However, whilst singing in front of Cowell and Sinitta, he partially stumbled and forgot the lyrics to "Easy" by Commodores. Initially, he was told he wasn't progressing through to judges' houses, but a change within the series format allowed him to successfully continue with the competition. He later sang "Smile" for his judges' houses performance, and afterwards was granted a place as one of the four acts through to the live shows.

During the live shows, many of Quinn's song choices and performances were old-fashioned and swing-based. Louis Walsh and Sharon Osbourne, in the earlier stages of the competition, queried him over his ability as a pure singer rather than a 'song-and-dance' man. However, in the later stages, he widened the range of his performances more into singing pop songs, and to which the judges were satisfied with Quinn's ability to do so. In week five, he was placed in the bottom two against Nikitta Angus, but survived elimination. He managed to progress through the competition up to week 10, where he was the series runner-up, losing to eventual winner Leona Lewis.

The X Factor performances and results
Episode	Theme	Song	Result
First audition	Free choice	"Ain't That a Kick in the Head?" / "Devil in Disguise"	Through to bootcamp
Bootcamp	Free choice	"Easy"	Through to judges' houses
Judges houses	Free choice	"Smile"	Through to live shows
Live show 1	Motown	"Ben"	Safe
Live show 2	Songs by Rod Stewart	"What a Wonderful World"	Safe
Live show 3	Big band	"Ain't That a Kick in the Head?"	Safe
Live show 4	Songs by ABBA	"Waterloo"	Safe
Live show 5	Love songs	"Crazy Little Thing Called Love"	Bottom two
Live show 6	Number ones	"Livin' la Vida Loca"	Safe
Live show 7	Songs from movies	"The Way You Look Tonight"	Safe
Live show 7	Songs from movies	"Jailhouse Rock"	Safe
Quarter-Final	Songs from Barry Manilow; contestants choice	"Mandy"	Safe
Quarter-Final	Songs from Barry Manilow; contestants choice	"My Way"	Safe
Semi-Final	No specific theme	"Smile"	Safe
Semi-Final	No specific theme	"You'll Never Walk Alone"	Safe
Final	Favourite performance; celebrity duets; audition songs; winner single	"My Way"	Runner-up
Final	Favourite performance; celebrity duets; audition songs; winner single	"That's Life" (duet with Westlife)	Runner-up
Final	Favourite performance; celebrity duets; audition songs; winner single	"Fly Me to the Moon"	Runner-up
Final	Favourite performance; celebrity duets; audition songs; winner single	"A Moment Like This"	Runner-up

=== 2007: Doing It My Way, breakthrough and label drop ===
In December 2006, two days after finishing on The X Factor, Quinn signed a record deal with Cowell's label SYCO to release a debut swing album. Recording process for the album began through January 2007 at the Capitol Records Tower in Los Angeles, where he was accompanied by a 48-piece orchestra.

His debut album, Doing It My Way was released on 12 March 2007. Coincidentally, another X Factor finalist Ben Mills released his album on the same day. The album became a critical and commercial success. It entered the UK Album Chart at number one, and sold 127,000 copies in its first week of release, before being certified platinum. The album also featured covers of old swing and vocal jazz classics, some of which were recorded by Frank Sinatra himself. Quinn made British music history as he was the youngest male solo artist and the first person to have a number one album without releasing a single.

During the summer of that year, he was a judge on the ITV dance competition show Baby Ballroom, alongside Bonnie Langford and Pierre Dulaine. The programme centered on finding the best junior ballroom dancers.

Quinn embarked on his own solo tour from September to November 2007, where he performed within 30 cities across the UK. However, on 6 November 2007, it was announced that he had been subsequently dropped by Sony BMG.

=== 2009–2015: Television and Stage ===
Quinn participated as a contestant on the fourth series of Dancing on Ice. He paired with professional skater Maria Filippov. Throughout the series, the couple earned high scores and praise from the ice panel each week. On 22 March 2009, he and Filippov won the competition over Donal MacIntyre and Jessica Taylor.

From 11 May to 28 November that year, he played Danny Zuko in the West End production of Grease at Picadilly Theatre. He starred alongside his future wife Emma Stephens, who played Sandy. Quinn previously played the role of Doody during the first production of the musical in 2008. In 2011, he reprised the role of Danny for two weeks at the Liverpool Empire. Other stage acting credits that Quinn has mainly featured in include: Jack Trott in Jack in the Beanstalk, the Prince in Sleeping Beauty and Cinderella, Warner Huntington III in Legally Blonde, and Billy Kosteki in Dirty Dancing.

In December 2012, Quinn was cast as the title character in the Aladdin musical, alongside comedian and presenter Don Maclean and actor Tim Flavin. He played the role at the Poole Lighthouse Theatre until 6 January 2013. He also portrayed Peter Pan in Peter Pan at the Liverpool Empire from December 2013 to January 2014, which also starred Stephens as Wendy Darling.

Quinn later returned to participate on Dancing on Ice, for the final and All-Star series of the show. He was paired with Maria Filippov again. On 9 March 2014, he and Filippov were crowned the champions of the series, and ultimate winners of the programme. He beat out Hayley Tamaddon and Beth Tweddle for the title.

He reprised his role as Aladdin again at the Liverpool Empire, from 13 December 2014 to 4 January 2015, alongside Claire Sweeney as the Genie and Pete Price as the Emperor.

In January 2015, he was a contestant on the celebrity talent show, Get Your Act Together. His mentor was actress and impressionist Debra Stephenson, whom he learned and mastered the craft of impressions from. Quinn was announced as the winner of the series, with James Bolam and Claire Richards in second and third place respectively.

=== 2015–2018: Dare to Dream and Judy: The Judy Garland Songbook ===
In September 2014, Quinn announced that he was planning to return to music, and had already started working on material for a second studio album.

He released his first single in eight years, "They Say Love" on 23 February 2015. Later that month, it was revealed that the title for the upcoming studio album would be called Dare to Dream, which was scheduled for an April 2015 release and promoted on a tour of the same name but was ultimately not released.

In May 2015, Quinn was part of the cast of Judy: The Judy Garland Songbook, alongside Lorna Luft and Louise Dearman. The show featured never before seen clips and interviews of Garland herself, as well as live performances of her original songs.

=== 2018–2019: Hollyoaks ===
On 26 November 2018, Quinn joined Channel 4 soap opera Hollyoaks as character Jonny Baxter. His character is an employee at The Bean and part of a right wing extremist group. He left the show in November 2019 when the story arc surrounding the far right came to an end.

=== 2020-2021: Undeniable and Coronavirus pandemic ===
Quinn's second album, Undeniable, was released on 28 August 2020.

During the Coronavirus pandemic, Quinn revealed that he had been working as a delivery driver for courier company Hermes. In April 2021, Quinn announced he had begun a new career laying carpets at his family firm, alongside brothers Robin and Darren.

=== 2024: Limelight Club - P&O Cruises ===
He is currently headlining each night at the Limelight Club on P&O cruise ships with his own show.

== Personal life ==
Quinn married actress Emma Stephens in Barbados on 31 March 2012. The couple also announced at the time that Stephens was expecting their first child. Their son was born in August 2012. In February 2015, the couple announced their separation. In September 2022, he and his partner, Emily Ashleigh, announced the birth of their daughter; Ashleigh has a son from a previous relationship.

In March 2021, Quinn spoke publicly about losing his father, also called Ray, to cancer in November 2020.

== Filmography ==
=== Film and television ===
Year	Title	Role	Notes
2000–2003	Brookside	Anthony Murray	Series regular
2003	Merseybeat	Leon Marsh	One episode; "Repeat Offender"
2005	Cactus Jack	John	Short film
2005	The Afternoon Play	John Reilly	One episode; "The Singing Cactus"
2006	Bulletproof	Ben	Short film Cannes Film Festival feature
2006	Doctors	Owen Miller	
2006	The X Factor	Himself / Contestant	Series 3 runner-up
2009; 2014	Dancing on Ice	Himself / Contestant	Series 4 and series 9 winner
2011	Little Crackers	Davey	One episode; "My First Ton"
2011	Nightvision	Warren	Internet drama
2015	Get Your Act Together	Himself / Contestant	Winner
2018–2019	Hollyoaks	Jonny Baxter	Series regular

=== Theatre ===
Year	Title	Role	Notes
1998	Me and My Girl		Dancer
1998	Peter Pan	Lost Boy	
2004	Buster		
2008	Grease	Doody	
2008; 2012; 2014–2015	Aladdin	Aladdin	
2009; 2011	Grease	Danny Zuko	
2009	Sleeping Beauty	Prince Daniel	Pantomime
2010–2011	Dirty Dancing	Billy Kosteki	
2011	Cinderella	Prince Charming	Pantomime
2012	Legally Blonde	Warner Huntington III	
2012–2013	The Rise and Fall of Little Voice	Billy	
2013–2014	Peter Pan	Peter Pan	
2015	The Judy Garland Songbook	Singer, Dancer	
2015	Puttin on the Ritz	Singer, Dancer	
2016	Peter Pan	Singer, Dancer	
2016	Songs from the West End	Singer, Dancer	
2017	The Wedding Singer	Glen Gulia	UK Tour
2018	Summer Holiday (musical)	Don	UK Tour
2018	Dick Whittington	Singer, Dancer	Pantomime

Ray Quinn played the title role of ‘Aladdin’ at Albert Halls, Bolton for Polka Dot Pantomimes in 2019.

=== Radio ===
- The Lost Boys – Narrator of book for Big Toe Radio, September 2004
- Millions – Narrator of the film for Big Toe Radio, November 2004
- The Believers – Actor playing part of James, April 2010

== Discography ==
Title	Details	Peak chart positions		Certifications
Title	Details	UK	IRE	Certifications
Doing It My Way	Released: 12 March 2007; Format: Digital download, CD; Label: Syco	1	6	UK: Platinum
Undeniable	Released: 28 Aug 2020; Format: Digital download, CD, Vinyl; Label: Northern Powerhouse Music	—	—	
"—" denotes a release that did not chart or was not released in that territory.

== Bibliography ==
- Quinn, Ray (2015). This Time Round. London: Percy Publishing. ISBN 978-0992929879.

== Tours ==
- X Factor 2006 Tour 2007
- Ray Quinn Solo Tour 2007
- Dancing on Ice Tour 2009
- Dancing on Ice Tour 2010
- Dancing on Ice Tour 2014
- Dare to Dream Tour 2015
- No Mans Land Tour 2016
- Dancing On Ice Tour 2018

== Awards ==
- 2002 – Best Dramatic Performance, The British Soap Awards
- 2002 – Best Storyline, The British Soap Awards
- 2002 – Best Young Actor, Inside Soap Awards
- 2002 – Best Performance in a Network Soap, Royal TV Society
- 2005 – Manchester Talent Competition, Search for a Star – £5000 prize
- 2007 – Scouseology Award, Best Personality
- 2007 – Liverpool Local Hero Awards, Contribution to Music
