= Dancing on Ice series 4 =

Fourth series of Dancing on Ice

Dancing on Ice
- Series 4
- Presented by: Phillip Schofield; Holly Willoughby
- Judges: Nicky Slater; Ruthie Henshall; Jason Gardiner; Karen Barber; Robin Cousins
- Celebrity winner: Ray Quinn
- Professional winner: Maria Filippov
- No. of episodes: 21

Release
- Original network: ITV
- Original release: 11 January – 22 March 2009

Series chronology
- ← Previous; Series 3 Next → Series 5

The fourth series of Dancing on Ice aired from 11 January to 22 March 2009 on ITV. Phillip Schofield and Holly Willoughby returned as main presenters, while Karen Barber, Nicky Slater, Jason Gardiner, Ruthie Henshall and Robin Cousins returned to the "Ice Panel".

The final took place on Sunday 22 March 2009 and was won by Ray Quinn.

== Judges and hosts ==
It was announced that Nicky Slater, Jason Gardiner, Ruthie Henshall, Karen Barber and Robin Cousins would all return for the fourth series, and Holly Willoughby and Phillip Schofield returned as hosts while Jayne Torvill and Christopher Dean returned to train.

== Couples ==
The line-up was revealed on 5 January 2009 with thirteen couples competing, including Michael Underwood, who returned to compete after pulling out the previous year due to injury. The celebrities and their partners were:

Celebrity	Notability	Professional partner	Status
Graeme Le Saux	England & Chelsea footballer	Kristina Lenko	Eliminated 1st on 11 January 2009
Gemma Bissix	EastEnders & Hollyoaks actress	Andrei Lipanov	Eliminated 2nd on 18 January 2009
Jeremy Edwards	Holby City actor	Darya Nucci	Eliminated 3rd on 25 January 2009
Michael Underwood	Television presenter	Melanie Lambert	Eliminated 4th on 1 February 2009
Todd Carty	Stage & screen actor	Susie Lipanova	Eliminated 5th on 8 February 2009
Ellery Hanley	England rugby player	Frankie Poultney	Eliminated 6th on 15 February 2009
Melinda Messenger	Glamour model & television presenter	Fred Palascak	Eliminated 7th on 22 February 2009
Roxanne Pallett	Emmerdale actress	Daniel Whiston	Eliminated 8th on 1 March 2009
Zoe Salmon	Blue Peter presenter	Matt Evers	Eliminated 9th on 8 March 2009
Coleen Nolan	Singer & Loose Women panellist	Stuart Widdall	Eliminated 10th on 15 March 2009
Jessica Taylor	Liberty X singer	Pavel Aubrecht	Third place on 22 March 2009
Donal MacIntyre	Investigative journalist	Florentine Houdinière	Runners-up on 22 March 2009
Ray Quinn	Actor & The X Factor runner-up	Maria Filippov	Winners on 22 March 2009

== Scoring chart ==
The highest score each week is indicated in bold green with a dagger (†), while the lowest score each week is indicated in italicized red with a double-dagger (‡).

Color key:

Winners
Runners-up
Third place
Bottom two
Eliminated

Dancing on Ice (series 4) - Weekly scores
Couple	Pl.	Week										
Couple	Pl.	1	2	3	4	5	6	7	8	9	10	11
Ray & Maria	1	**23.5**†	—	**25.0**†	**24.0**†	**26.5**†	**30.0**†	**29.5**†	**26.0**†	**28.0**†	**28.0**†	30.0+30.0=**60.0**† (Note: This couple finished in first place.)
Donal & Florentine	2	13.5 (Note: This couple was in the bottom two, but was not eliminated.)	—	15.0	16.0	17.0	18.5	17.0	23.0	22.0	22.5	23.5+25.5=49.0‡ (Note: This couple finished in second place.)
Jessica & Pavel	3	—	**21.0**†	20.5	21.5	22.0	23.5	24.5	23.5	26.0	26.5	25.5+26.0=51.5 (Note: This couple finished in third place.)
Coleen & Stuart	4	—	12.5‡	17.0	16.0	15.5	14.5‡	16.5‡	16.5‡	18.5‡	16.5‡ (Note: This couple was eliminated.)	
Zoe & Matt	5	—	18.5	16.5	20.0	22.0	22.0	23.5	25.5	23.5		
Roxanne & Daniel	6	—	15.0	18.0	17.0	16.5	16.0	19.0	21.0			
Melinda & Fred	7	—	15.5	19.0	16.5	16.5	17.5	18.5				
Ellery & Frankie	8	17.5	—	16.0	16.0	15.0	15.5					
Todd & Susie	9	7.5‡	—	9.5‡	7.5‡	8.5‡						
Michael & Melanie	10	15.0	—	17.0	18.5							
Jeremy & Darya	11	15.0	—	16.0								
Gemma & Andrei	12	—	13.0									
Graeme & Kristina	13	14.5										

== Weekly scores ==
=== Week 1 (11 January 2009) ===
Only the male celebrities skated this week. Couples are listed in the order they performed.

Couple	Judges' scores					Total score	Music	Public vote	Points			Result
Couple	Barber	Slater	Gardiner	Henshall	Cousins	Total score	Music	Public vote	Judges	Public	Total	Result
Jeremy & Darya	3.5	3.5	3.0	2.0	3.0	15.0	"True" — Spandau Ballet	3.23%	5	1	6	Safe
Donal & Florentine	2.5	3.0	2.5	2.0	3.5	13.5	"Rockstar" — Nickelback	7.69%	2	3	5	Bottom two
Todd & Susie	2.0	1.5	1.0	1.5	1.5	7.5	"(Everything I Do) I Do It for You" — Bryan Adams	18.15%	1	6	7	Safe
Ellery & Frankie	3.5	4.0	3.0	3.0	4.0	17.5	"Born To Run" — Bruce Springsteen	9.51%	6	4	10	Safe
Ray & Maria	4.5	5.0	4.5	4.5	5.0	23.5	"MMMBop" — Hanson	42.65%	7	7	14	Safe
Graeme & Kristina	3.0	2.5	3.0	2.5	3.5	14.5	"I've Got You Under My Skin" — Frank Sinatra	5.88%	3	2	5	Eliminated
Michael & Melanie	3.5	3.0	2.5	2.5	3.5	15.0	"Have I Told You Lately" — Van Morrison	12.86%	5	5	10	Safe

Judges' votes to save

- Barber: Donal & Florentine
- Slater: Donal & Florentine
- Gardiner: Donal & Florentine
- Henshall: Donal & Florentine
- Cousins: Donal & Florentine

=== Week 2 (18 January 2009) ===
Only the female celebrities skated this week. Couples are listed in the order they performed.

Couple	Judges' scores					Total score	Music	Public vote	Points			Result
Couple	Barber	Slater	Gardiner	Henshall	Cousins	Total score	Music	Public vote	Judges	Public	Total	Result
Roxanne & Daniel	3.0	3.0	2.5	3.0	3.5	15.0	"Take a Bow" — Rihanna	13.56%	3	5	8	Safe
Melinda & Fred	3.5	2.5	2.5	3.5	3.5	15.5	"Love Song" — Sara Bareilles	2.92%	4	1	5	Bottom two
Coleen & Stuart	2.5	2.5	2.0	2.5	3.0	12.5	"Dream a Little Dream of Me" — Ella Fitzgerald	61.80%	1	6	7	Safe
Zoe & Matt	4.0	4.0	3.0	3.5	4.0	18.5	"I Wanna Dance With Somebody (Who Loves Me)" — Whitney Houston	7.59%	5	3	8	Safe
Gemma & Andrei	2.5	3.0	2.0	2.5	3.0	13.0	"The Power of Love" — Jennifer Rush	3.90%	2	2	4	Eliminated
Jessica & Pavel	4.5	4.5	3.5	4.0	4.5	21.0	"La Isla Bonita" — Madonna	10.22%	6	4	10	Safe

Judges' votes to save

- Barber: Melinda & Fred
- Slater: Melinda & Fred
- Gardiner: Melinda & Fred
- Henshall: Melinda & Fred
- Cousins: Melinda & Fred

=== Week 3 (25 January 2009) ===
Required element: Toe step sequence

Couples are listed in the order they performed.

Couple	Judges' scores					Total score	Music	Public vote	Points			Result
Couple	Barber	Slater	Gardiner	Henshall	Cousins	Total score	Music	Public vote	Judges	Public	Total	Result
Ellery & Frankie	4.0	3.5	2.5	3.0	3.0	16.0	"5 Years Time" — Noah & The Whale	2.11%	5	3	8	Bottom two
Jessica & Pavel	4.5	4.0	4.0	3.5	4.5	20.5	"Heaven" — DJ Sammy & Yanou, feat. Do	2.24%	10	4	14	Safe
Donal & Florentine	3.0	4.0	2.0	3.0	3.0	15.0	"The Dock of the Bay" — Otis Redding	3.67%	4	7	11	Safe
Coleen & Stuart	3.5	4.5	2.5	3.0	3.5	17.0	"Islands in the Stream" — Dolly Parton & Kenny Rogers	24.12%	7	10	17	Safe
Jeremy & Darya	4.0	4.0	2.5	2.5	3.0	16.0	"Faith" — George Michael	1.21%	5	1	6	Eliminated
Melinda & Fred	4.0	4.5	3.0	3.5	4.0	19.0	"Both Sides Now" — Hayley Westenra	3.25%	9	5	14	Safe
Ray & Maria	5.0	5.0	5.0	5.0	5.0	25.0	"You Make It Real" — James Morrison	16.17%	11	9	20	Safe
Michael & Melanie	3.5	3.5	3.0	3.5	3.5	17.0	"Fascination" — Alphabeat	1.86%	7	2	9	Safe
Zoe & Matt	3.0	3.0	3.5	4.0	3.0	16.5	"Rise" — Gabrielle	3.39%	6	6	12	Safe
Todd & Susie	2.0	2.5	1.0	2.0	2.0	9.5	"Help!" — The Beatles	33.96%	3	11	14	Safe
Roxanne & Daniel	4.0	4.0	3.0	3.0	4.0	18.0	"Genie in a Bottle" — Christina Aguilera	7.96%	8	8	16	Safe

Judges' votes to save

- Barber: Ellery & Frankie
- Slater: Ellery & Frankie
- Gardiner: Ellery & Frankie
- Henshall: Ellery & Frankie
- Cousins: Ellery & Frankie

=== Week 4 (1 February 2009) ===
Required element: Pair spiral

Couples are listed in the order they performed.

Couple	Judges' scores					Total score	Music	Public vote	Points			Result
Couple	Barber	Slater	Gardiner	Henshall	Cousins	Total score	Music	Public vote	Judges	Public	Total	Result
Melinda & Fred	3.5	3.0	3.5	3.5	3.0	16.5	"Macarena" — Los del Río	2.58%	5	2	7	Bottom two
Ray & Maria	5.0	5.0	4.0	5.0	5.0	24.0	"Smooth Criminal" — Michael Jackson	14.61%	10	8	18	Safe
Zoe & Matt	4.0	3.5	4.0	4.5	4.0	20.0	"Hot n Cold" — Katy Perry	3.31%	8	3	11	Safe
Ellery & Frankie	3.5	3.5	3.0	2.5	3.5	16.0	"With or Without You" — U2	3.67%	4	4	8	Safe
Coleen & Stuart	3.5	3.0	3.0	3.5	3.0	16.0	"I'm in the Mood for Dancing" — The Nolan Sisters	25.58%	4	10	14	Safe
Donal & Florentine	3.5	4.5	2.5	2.5	3.0	16.0	"Everybody Needs Somebody to Love" — Solomon Burke	11.38%	4	7	11	Safe
Michael & Melanie	4.0	4.0	3.5	3.5	3.5	18.5	"Kiss" — Prince	2.46%	7	1	8	Eliminated
Roxanne & Daniel	3.5	4.0	3.0	3.0	3.5	17.0	"Sweet About Me" — Gabriella Climi	9.01%	6	6	12	Safe
Todd & Susie	2.0	2.0	1.0	1.0	1.5	7.5	"Every Breath You Take" — The Police	23.47%	3	9	12	Safe
Jessica & Pavel	4.5	5.0	4.0	3.5	4.5	21.5	"Groove Is in the Heart" — Deee-Lite	3.90%	9	5	14	Safe

Judges' votes to save

- Barber: Michael & Melanie
- Slater: Michael & Melanie
- Gardiner: Melinda & Fred
- Henshall: Melinda & Fred
- Cousins: Melinda & Fred

=== Week 5 (8 February 2009) ===
Required element: Change of edge

Couples are listed in the order they performed.

Couple	Judges' scores					Total score	Music	Public vote	Points			Result
Couple	Barber	Slater	Gardiner	Henshall	Cousins	Total score	Music	Public vote	Judges	Public	Total	Result
Jessica & Pavel	4.5	4.5	4.5	4.0	4.5	22.0	"Cheek to Cheek" — Ella Fitzgerald	2.08%	8	1	9	Safe
Donal & Florentine	3.5	4.0	3.0	3.0	3.5	17.0	"Black and Gold" — Sam Sparro	6.43%	6	5	11	Safe
Roxanne & Daniel	3.5	3.5	3.0	3.0	3.5	16.5	"Hallelujah" — Alexandra Burke	14.23%	5	6	11	Safe
Ellery & Frankie	3.0	4.0	2.5	2.5	3.0	15.0	"Boogie Wonderland" — Earth, Wind & Fire, feat. The Emotions	2.71%	2	2	4	Bottom two
Zoe & Matt	4.0	4.5	4.5	4.5	4.5	22.0	"Lovin' You" — Minnie Riperton	4.38%	8	3	11	Safe
Todd & Susie	2.0	2.0	1.5	1.5	1.5	8.5	"Smile" — Charlie Chaplin	16.15%	1	7	8	Eliminated
Melinda & Fred	3.5	3.5	3.0	3.5	3.0	16.5	"Up" — The Saturdays	4.94%	5	4	9	Safe
Coleen & Stuart	3.0	3.0	3.0	3.5	3.0	15.5	"Can't Fight the Moonlight" — LeAnn Rimes	27.47%	3	9	12	Safe
Ray & Maria	5.0	5.0	5.5	5.5	5.5	26.5	"Canned Heat" — Jamiroquai	21.57%	9	8	17	Safe

Judges' votes to save

- Barber: Ellery & Frankie
- Slater: Ellery & Frankie
- Gardiner: Ellery & Frankie
- Henshall: Todd & Susie
- Cousins: Ellery & Frankie

=== Week 6 (15 February 2009) ===
Theme: 80's Night
Required element: Shadow spin

Couples are listed in the order they performed.

Couple	Judges' scores					Total score	Music	Public vote	Points			Result
Couple	Barber	Slater	Gardiner	Henshall	Cousins	Total score	Music	Public vote	Judges	Public	Total	Result
Roxanne & Daniel	3.5	3.5	3.0	3.0	3.0	16.0	"China in Your Hand" — T'Pau	14.08%	3	6	9	Safe
Donal & Florentine	4.0	4.0	3.5	3.5	3.5	18.5	"Addicted to Love" — Robert Palmer	7.24%	5	5	10	Safe
Jessica & Pavel	5.0	5.0	4.5	4.5	4.5	23.5	"Venus" — Shocking Blue	3.30%	7	1	8	Safe
Coleen & Stuart	3.0	2.5	3.0	3.0	3.0	14.5	"Lady in Red" — Chris de Burgh	32.95%	1	8	9	Safe
Ellery & Frankie	3.5	3.0	2.5	3.0	3.5	15.5	"Come on Eileen" — Dexy's Midnight Runners	6.74%	2	4	6	Eliminated
Melinda & Fred	3.5	3.5	3.5	3.5	3.5	17.5	"99 Red Balloons" — Nena	3.80%	4	2	6	Bottom two
Ray & Maria	6.0	6.0	6.0	6.0	6.0	30.0	"Nothing's Gonna Stop Us Now" — Starship	26.61%	8	7	15	Safe
Zoe & Matt	4.5	4.5	4.5	4.5	4.0	22.0	"I Think We're Alone Now" — Tiffany	5.24%	6	3	9	Safe

Judges' votes to save

- Barber: Melinda & Fred
- Slater: Ellery & Frankie
- Gardiner: Melinda & Fred
- Henshall: Melinda & Fred
- Cousins: Melinda & Fred

=== Week 7 (22 February 2009) ===
Required element: Step sequence (including a spiral, lunge, cross roll, and one-footed stop)

Couples are listed in the order they performed.

Couple	Judges' scores					Total score	Music	Public vote	Points			Result
Couple	Barber	Slater	Gardiner	Henshall	Cousins	Total score	Music	Public vote	Judges	Public	Total	Result
Zoe & Matt	4.5	5.0	5.0	5.0	4.0	23.5	"Mamma Mia!" — ABBA	4.02%	5	2	7	Safe
Melinda & Fred	4.0	3.5	3.5	3.5	4.0	18.5	"Let's Hear It for the Boy" — Deniece Williams	7.52%	3	3	6	Eliminated
Donal & Florentine	3.0	4.0	3.5	3.5	3.0	17.0	"Everybody Hurts" — R.E.M.	17.02%	2	5	7	Safe
Roxanne & Daniel	4.0	4.0	4.0	3.0	4.0	19.0	"I Wanna Be Loved by You" — Marilyn Monroe	14.31%	4	4	8	Safe
Jessica & Pavel	5.0	4.5	5.0	5.0	5.0	24.5	"Un-Break My Heart" — Toni Braxton	3.71%	6	1	7	Bottom two
Ray & Maria	6.0	6.0	5.5	6.0	6.0	29.5	"Rock Around the Clock" — Bill Haley & His Comets	21.90%	7	6	13	Safe
Coleen & Stuart	3.5	3.5	3.0	3.5	3.0	16.5	"The Shoop Shoop Song (It's in His Kiss)" — Cher	31.50%	1	7	8	Safe

Judges' votes to save

- Barber: Jessica & Pavel
- Slater: Jessica & Pavel
- Gardiner: Jessica & Pavel
- Henshall: Jessica & Pavel
- Cousins: Jessica & Pavel

=== Week 8 (1 March 2009) ===
Theme: Prop Week

Couples are listed in the order they performed.

Couple	Judges' scores					Total score	Music	Prop	Public vote	Points			Result
Couple	Barber	Slater	Gardiner	Henshall	Cousins	Total score	Music	Prop	Public vote	Judges	Public	Total	Result
Roxanne & Daniel	4.5	4.0	4.0	4.0	4.5	21.0	"Don't Cha" — The Pussycat Dolls	Chair	17.41%	2	3	5	Eliminated
Ray & Maria	5.5	5.0	4.5	5.5	5.5	26.0	"Have You Met Miss Jones?" — Frank Sinatra	Hat	20.48%	6	4	10	Safe
Jessica & Pavel	5.0	4.5	4.0	5.0	5.0	23.5	"Umbrella" — Rihanna, feat. Jay-Z	Umbrella	9.16%	4	2	6	Safe
Coleen & Stuart	3.5	4.0	2.5	3.5	3.0	16.5	"I Just Wanna Make Love to You" — Etta James	Feather boa	21.84%	1	5	6	Safe
Donal & Florentine	4.0	5.0	4.5	4.5	5.0	23.0	"I Guess That's Why They Call It the Blues" — Elton John	Broom	22.63%	3	6	9	Safe
Zoe & Matt	5.0	4.5	5.0	6.0	5.0	25.5	"The Boy Does Nothing" — Alesha Dixon	Cane	8.45%	5	1	6	Bottom two

Judges' votes to save

- Barber: Zoe & Matt
- Slater: Zoe & Matt
- Gardiner: Zoe & Matt
- Henshall: Zoe & Matt
- Cousins: Zoe & Matt

=== Week 9 (8 March 2009) ===
Required element: Unassisted jump

Couples are listed in the order they performed.

Couple	Judges' scores					Total score	Music	Public vote	Points			Result
Couple	Barber	Slater	Gardiner	Henshall	Cousins	Total score	Music	Public vote	Judges	Public	Total	Result
Jessica & Pavel	5.0	5.0	5.5	5.5	5.0	26.0	"Mercy" — Duffy	10.82%	4	1	5	Bottom two
Donal & Florentine	4.0	4.5	4.5	4.5	4.5	22.0	"Let's Stick Together" — Bryan Ferry	21.06%	2	3	5	Safe
Zoe & Matt	5.0	4.0	4.5	5.5	4.5	23.5	"Run" — Snow Patrol	11.72%	3	2	5	Eliminated
Coleen & Stuart	3.5	3.5	4.0	4.0	3.5	18.5	"Diamonds Are Forever" — Shirley Bassey	25.44%	1	4	5	Safe
Ray & Maria	5.5	5.5	5.5	6.0	5.5	28.0	"Use Somebody" — Kings of Leon	30.93%	5	5	10	Safe

Judges' votes to save

- Barber: Jessica & Pavel
- Slater: Jessica & Pavel
- Gardiner: Jessica & Pavel
- Henshall: Zoe & Matt
- Cousins: Jessica & Pavel

=== Week 10: Semifinals (15 March 2009) ===
Required element: 20-second solo dance

Couples are listed in the order they performed.

Couple	Judges' scores					Total score	Music	Public vote	Points			Result
Couple	Barber	Slater	Gardiner	Henshall	Cousins	Total score	Music	Public vote	Judges	Public	Total	Result
Donal & Florentine	4.5	4.5	3.5	5.0	5.0	22.5	"Live and Let Die" — Paul McCartney	21.62%	2	2	4	Bottom two
Ray & Maria	5.5	6.0	5.5	5.5	5.5	28.0	"Bailamos" — Enrique Iglesias	33.51%	4	4	8	Safe
Coleen & Stuart	3.5	3.5	3.0	3.5	3.0	16.5	"You're Still the One" — Shania Twain	13.18%	1	1	2	Eliminated
Jessica & Pavel	5.0	5.0	5.5	5.5	5.5	26.5	"Why" — Annie Lennox	31.67%	3	3	6	Safe

Judges' votes to save

- Barber: Donal & Florentine
- Slater: Donal & Florentine
- Gardiner: Donal & Florentine
- Henshall: Donal & Florentine
- Cousins: Donal & Florentine

=== Week 11: Finale (22 March 2009) ===
Required element: Flying

Couples are listed in the order they performed.

Couple	Judges' scores					Total score	Music	Public vote	Boléro	Result
Couple	Barber	Slater	Gardiner	Henshall	Cousins	Total score	Music	Public vote	Boléro	Result
Donal & Florentine	5.0	4.5	3.0	6.0	5.0	49.0	"Rocket Man" — Elton John	20.79%	24.97%	Runners-up
Donal & Florentine	5.0	5.0	5.0	5.5	5.0	49.0	"Everybody Hurts" — R.E.M	20.79%	24.97%	Runners-up
Jessica & Pavel	5.5	5.0	4.5	5.0	5.5	51.5	"One Moment in Time" — Whitney Houston	15.36%		Third place
Jessica & Pavel	5.5	5.5	5.0	5.0	5.0	51.5	"Mercy" — Duffy	15.36%		Third place
Ray & Maria	6.0	6.0	6.0	6.0	6.0	60.0	"Greatest Day" — Take That	63.83%	75.02%	Winners
Ray & Maria	6.0	6.0	6.0	6.0	6.0	60.0	"Nothing's Gonna Stop Us Now" — Starship	63.83%	75.02%	Winners

== Ratings ==
Show	Date	Official ITV1 rating (millions)	Weekly rank	Share
Live show 1	11 January	8.83	6	32.4%
Results 1	11 January	7.19	13	24.9%
Live show 2	18 January	9.62	6	34.3%
Results 2	18 January	7.20	13	26.1%
Live show 3	25 January	8.58	6	33.2%
Results 3	25 January	6.98	12	25.9%
Live show 4	1 February	10.01	4	35.7%
Results 4	1 February	8.17	8	30.5%
Live show 5	8 February	9.43	6	33.7%
Results 5	8 February	7.69	11	27.9%
Live show 6	15 February	9.64	5	35.8%
Results 6	15 February	8.93	7	31.5%
Live show 7	22 February	9.59	6	35.5%
Results 7	22 February	8.76	7	31.2%
Live show 8	1 March	9.47	4	35.9%
Results 8	1 March	8.38	6	31.4%
Live show 9	8 March	9.74	4	35.4%
Results 9	8 March	8.92	7	31.4%
Semifinals	15 March	9.65	3	36.7%
Semifinals results	15 March	8.42	7	31.5%
Live finale	22 March	11.31	1	43.2%
