= Dancing on Ice series 3 =

Third series of Dancing on Ice

Dancing on Ice
- Series 3
- Presented by: Phillip Schofield; Holly Willoughby
- Judges: Nicky Slater; Ruthie Henshall; Jason Gardiner; Karen Barber; Robin Cousins
- Celebrity winner: Suzanne Shaw
- Professional winner: Matt Evers
- No. of episodes: 19

Release
- Original network: ITV
- Original release: 13 January – 16 March 2008

Series chronology
- ← Previous; Series 2 Next → Series 4

The third series of Dancing on Ice aired from 13 January to 16 March 2008 on ITV. The show moved from Saturday nights to Sunday nights, with Phillip Schofield and Holly Willoughby returning as hosts. Karen Barber, Nicky Slater, Jason Gardiner, and Robin Cousins returned to the "Ice Panel", with Ruthie Henshall joining as a replacement for Natalia Bestemianova. The commissioning of the series was first confirmed by Schofield at the 2007 BAFTA Awards.

== Judges and hosts ==
It was announced that Natalia Bestemianova would depart the series. Robin Cousins, Karen Barber, Nicky Slater, and Jason Gardiner announced their returns, with Ruthie Henshall joining the show as a replacement judge. Phillip Schofield and Holly Willoughby announced their returns and coaches Jayne Torvill and Christopher Dean also returned as mentors.

== Contestants ==
The contestants for the third series were revealed on 7 January 2008: The contestants for the third series were:

Celebrity	Notability	Professional partner	Status
Sarah Greene	Television presenter	Fred Palascak	Eliminated 1st on 13 January 2008
Natalie Pinkham	Sports television presenter	Andrei Lipanov	Eliminated 2nd on 20 January 2008
Michael Underwood	Television presenter	Melanie Lambert	Withdrew on 24 January 2008
Samantha Mumba	Singer-songwriter	Pavel Aubrecht	Eliminated 3rd on 27 January 2008
Aggie MacKenzie	How Clean Is Your House? co-presenter	Sergey Malyshev	Eliminated 4th on 3 February 2008
Tim Vincent	Television presenter	Victoria Borzenkova	Eliminated 5th on 10 February 2008
Steve Backley	Olympic javelin thrower	Susie Lipanova	Eliminated 6th on 17 February 2008
Linda Lusardi	Model & Emmerdale actress	Daniel Whiston	Eliminated 7th on 24 February 2008
Greg Rusedski	Professional tennis player	Kristina Lenko	Eliminated 8th on 2 March 2008
Gareth Gates	Singer-songwriter	Maria Filippov	Eliminated 9th on 9 March 2008
Zaraah Abrahams	Coronation Street actress	Fred Palascak	Third place on 16 March 2008
Chris Fountain	Hollyoaks actor	Frankie Poultney	Runners-up on 16 March 2008
Suzanne Shaw	Hear'Say singer	Matt Evers	Winners on 16 March 2008

== Scoring chart ==
The highest score each week is indicated in bold green with a dagger (†), while the lowest score each week is indicated in italicized red with a double-dagger (‡).

Color key:

Winners
Runners-up
Third place
Bottom two
Withdrew from competition
Eliminated

Dancing on Ice (series 3) - Weekly scores
Couple	Pl.	Week									
Couple	Pl.	1	2	3	4	5	6	7	8	9	10
Suzanne & Matt	1	19.0	**20.5**†	20.5	22.0	24.5	23.5	**27.5**†	24.0	27.5	30.0+30.0=**60.0**† (Note: This couple finished in first place.)
Chris & Frankie	2	**20.0**†	20.0	**23.5**†	**25.0**†	**27.0**†	**24.5**†	27.0	**27.0**†	**29.0**†	25.5+29.0=54.5 (Note: This couple finished in second place.)
Zaraah & Fred	3	(Note: Zaraah & Fred did not join the competition until week 3.)		18.5	19.0	22.5	22.0 (Note: This couple was in the bottom two, but was not eliminated.)	18.5	24.5	27.0	26.0+26.5=52.5‡ (Note: This couple finished in third place.)
Gareth & Maria	4	17.5	19.5	19.5	20.5	20.0	23.0	23.0	25.5	24.5‡ (Note: This couple was eliminated.)	
Greg & Kristina	5	13.0	11.5	15.5	13.0	16.5	16.0‡	17.0‡	20.5‡		
Linda & Daniel	6	16.5	16.5	16.5	17.0	15.5	19.0	19.0			
Steve & Susie	7	15.0	15.0	14.5	14.5	17.0	18.0				
Tim & Victoria	8	13.5	16.0	16.5	16.0	12.5‡					
Aggie & Sergey	9	10.5‡	10.0‡	12.5‡	10.0‡						
Samantha & Pavel	10	15.5	16.0	16.0							
Michael & Melanie	11	16.5	16.5	(Note: This couple withdrew from the competition.)							
Natalie & Andrei	12	15.0	14.0								
Sarah & Fred	13	11.5									

== Weekly scores ==
=== Week 1 (13 January) ===
Couples are listed in the order they performed.

Couple	Judges' scores					Total score	Music	Public vote	Points			Result
Couple	Barber	Slater	Gardiner	Henshall	Cousins	Total score	Music	Public vote	Judges	Public	Total	Result
Greg & Kristina	3.0	3.0	2.0	2.0	3.0	13.0	"I Got You Babe" — Sonny & Cher	10.97%	5	9	14	Safe
Suzanne & Matt	4.0	4.5	3.0	3.5	4.0	19.0	"Hips Don't Lie" — Shakira	24.01%	11	12	23	Safe
Aggie & Sergey	2.5	2.0	1.0	2.5	2.5	10.5	"Build Me Up Buttercup" — The Foundations	8.78%	3	8	11	Safe
Tim & Victoria	3.0	2.5	2.0	2.5	3.5	13.5	"She's a Lady" — Tom Jones	6.82%	6	7	13	Safe
Natalie & Andrei	3.5	3.0	2.5	3.0	3.0	15.0	"About You Now" — Sugababes	3.00%	7	3	10	Safe
Steve & Susie	3.0	2.5	3.0	3.5	3.0	15.0	"For Once in My Life" — Stevie Wonder	4.03%	7	5	12	Safe
Sarah & Fred	2.5	2.0	2.0	2.5	2.5	11.5	"Downtown" — Petula Clark	2.17%	4	2	6	Eliminated
Chris & Frankie	4.5	4.5	3.0	3.5	4.5	20.0	"I Bet You Look Good on the Dancefloor" — Arctic Monkeys	14.90%	12	11	23	Safe
Samantha & Pavel	3.0	3.5	2.5	3.5	3.0	15.5	"Will You Still Love Me Tomorrow" — Amy Winehouse	2.10%	8	1	9	Bottom two
Michael & Melanie	3.0	4.0	2.5	3.5	3.5	16.5	"Walking on Sunshine" — Katrina and the Waves	3.76%	9	4	13	Safe
Linda & Daniel	4.0	3.5	3.0	2.5	3.5	16.5	"She's the One" — Robbie Williams	6.90%	9	6	15	Safe
Gareth & Maria	4.0	4.0	3.0	3.5	3.0	17.5	"Beautiful Day" — U2	12.56%	10	10	20	Safe

Judges' votes to save

- Barber: Samantha & Pavel
- Slater: Samantha & Pavel
- Gardiner: Samantha & Pavel
- Henshall: Samantha & Pavel
- Cousins: Samantha & Pavel

=== Week 2 (20 January) ===
Couples are listed in the order they performed.

Couple	Judges' scores					Total score	Music	Public vote	Points			Result
Couple	Barber	Slater	Gardiner	Henshall	Cousins	Total score	Music	Public vote	Judges	Public	Total	Result
Linda & Daniel	3.5	3.5	3.0	3.0	3.5	16.5	"I Love to Love (But My Baby Loves to Dance)" — Tina Charles	5.57%	8	6	14	Safe
Chris & Frankie	4.5	4.5	3.0	3.5	4.5	20.0	"Hey There Delilah" — Plain White T's	17.96%	10	9	19	Safe
Natalie & Andrei	3.5	2.5	2.5	2.5	3.0	14.0	"Bleeding Love" — Leona Lewis	3.98%	5	2	7	Eliminated
Greg & Kristina	3.0	2.5	1.5	2.0	2.5	11.5	"Dance the Night Away" — The Mavericks	7.76%	4	8	12	Safe
Aggie & Sergey	2.5	2.0	1.5	2.0	2.0	10.0	"I'm a Woman" — Bette Midler	5.93%	3	7	10	Safe
Tim & Victoria	3.5	3.5	2.5	3.0	3.5	16.0	"Every Little Thing She Does Is Magic" — The Police	2.38%	7	1	8	Bottom two
Suzanne & Matt	4.5	4.5	3.5	3.5	4.5	20.5	"When You're Gone" — Avril Lavigne	24.58%	11	11	22	Safe
Steve & Susie	3.0	3.0	2.0	3.0	4.0	15.0	"Stand by Me" — Ben E. King	5.34%	6	5	11	Safe
Samantha & Pavel	3.5	3.5	2.0	3.5	3.5	16.0	"What's Love Got to Do with It" — Tina Turner	4.12%	7	3	10	Safe
Gareth & Maria	4.0	4.0	3.0	4.0	4.5	19.5	"Hard to Handle" — Otis Redding	18.10%	9	10	19	Safe
Michael & Melanie	3.5	3.5	3.0	3.0	3.5	16.5	"Wonderful Tonight" — Eric Clapton	4.28%	8	4	12	Safe

Judges' votes to save

- Barber: Natalie & Andrei
- Slater: Tim & Victoria
- Gardiner: Tim & Victoria
- Henshall: Tim & Victoria
- Cousins: Natalie & Andrei

=== Week 3 (27 January) ===
On 24 January 2008, Michael Underwood and Melanie Lambert had to withdraw due to an ankle injury to Underwood.

Zaraah Abrahams was stepped in as a replacement.

Couples are listed in the order they performed.

Couple	Judges' scores					Total score	Music	Public vote	Points			Result
Couple	Barber	Slater	Gardiner	Henshall	Cousins	Total score	Music	Public vote	Judges	Public	Total	Result
Gareth & Maria	4.5	4.0	3.5	3.5	4.0	19.5	"Wake Me Up When September Ends" — Green Day	6.81%	8	5	13	Safe
Linda & Daniel	3.5	3.0	3.0	4.0	3.0	16.5	"Candyman" — Christina Aguilera	9.09%	6	7	13	Safe
Samantha & Pavel	3.5	3.0	3.0	3.5	3.0	16.0	"You Can't Hurry Love" — The Supremes	3.30%	5	1	6	Eliminated
Chris & Frankie	5.0	5.0	4.0	4.5	5.0	23.5	"Rule the World" — Take That	19.20%	10	9	19	Safe
Aggie & Sergey	2.5	2.0	2.0	3.5	2.5	12.5	"Total Eclipse of the Heart" — Bonnie Tyler	5.00%	2	4	6	Safe
Steve & Susie	3.0	3.5	2.0	3.0	3.0	14.5	"Mony Mony" — Billy Idol	4.68%	3	2	5	Bottom two
Greg & Kristina	3.5	3.5	2.5	3.0	3.0	15.5	"Licence to Kill" — Gladys Knight	12.90%	4	8	12	Safe
Zaraah & Fred	4.0	4.5	3.0	3.5	3.5	18.5	"Take a Chance on Me" — ABBA	7.88%	7	6	13	Safe
Tim & Victoria	3.5	4.0	3.0	3.0	3.0	16.5	"Under Pressure" — Queen	4.76%	6	3	9	Safe
Suzanne & Matt	4.5	4.5	3.5	3.5	4.5	20.5	"Somethin' Stupid" — Robbie Williams and Nicole Kidman	23.39%	9	10	19	Safe

Judges' votes to save

- Barber: Steve & Susie
- Slater: Steve & Susie
- Gardiner: Steve & Susie
- Henshall: Steve & Susie
- Cousins: Steve & Susie

=== Week 4 (3 February) ===
Theme: Broadway Night

Couples are listed in the order they performed.

Couple	Judges' scores					Total score	Music	Broadway musical	Public vote	Points			Result
Couple	Barber	Slater	Gardiner	Henshall	Cousins	Total score	Music	Broadway musical	Public vote	Judges	Public	Total	Result
Tim & Victoria	3.5	3.5	3.0	3.0	3.0	16.0	"You're The One That I Want"	Grease	3.78%	4	2	6	Safe
Linda & Daniel	4.0	3.5	3.0	3.0	3.5	17.0	"I Know Him So Well"	Chess	9.33%	5	5	10	Safe
Steve & Susie	3.0	3.0	2.5	3.0	3.0	14.5	"Hello Dolly"	Hello Dolly	2.30%	3	1	4	Bottom two
Suzanne & Matt	4.5	4.5	4.0	4.5	4.5	22.0	"Fame"	Fame	25.92%	8	9	17	Safe
Aggie & Sergey	2.0	2.0	1.5	2.5	2.0	10.0	"I Feel Pretty"	West Side Story	5.02%	1	3	4	Eliminated
Chris & Frankie	5.0	5.0	5.0	5.0	5.0	25.0	"Time Warp"	The Rocky Horror Show	19.69%	9	8	17	Safe
Greg & Kristina	3.0	3.0	2.5	2.5	2.5	13.5	"Any Dream Will Do"	Joseph and the Amazing Technicolor Dreamcoat	14.27%	2	7	9	Safe
Zaraah & Fred	4.5	4.0	3.5	3.0	4.0	19.0	"Don't Cry For Me, Argentina"	Evita	12.85%	6	6	12	Safe
Gareth & Maria	4.0	4.5	4.0	4.0	4.0	20.5	"Razzle Dazzle"	Chicago	6.83%	7	4	11	Safe

Judges' votes to save

- Barber: Steve & Susie
- Slater: Steve & Susie
- Gardiner: Steve & Susie
- Henshall: Steve & Susie
- Cousins: Steve & Susie

=== Week 5 (10 February) ===
Couples are listed in the order they performed.

Couple	Judges' scores					Total score	Music	Public vote	Points			Result
Couple	Barber	Slater	Gardiner	Henshall	Cousins	Total score	Music	Public vote	Judges	Public	Total	Result
Greg & Kristina	3.5	3.5	3.0	3.0	3.0	16.5	"She's So Lovely" — Scouting for Girls	14.88%	3	6	9	Safe
Suzanne & Matt	5.0	4.5	5.0	5.0	5.0	24.5	"Are You Gonna Be My Girl" — Jet	20.16%	7	7	14	Safe
Tim & Victoria	2.5	2.5	2.5	2.5	2.5	12.5	"Love Today" — Mika	4.30%	1	1	2	Eliminated
Gareth & Maria	4.5	4.0	4.0	3.5	4.0	20.0	"Blame It on the Boogie" — The Jacksons	6.46%	5	3	8	Safe
Zaraah & Fred	4.5	4.5	4.5	4.5	4.5	22.5	"Diamonds and Pearls" — Prince	9.08%	6	4	10	Safe
Steve & Susie	3.5	4.0	3.0	3.5	3.0	17.0	"Uptown Girl" — Westlife	4.88%	4	2	6	Bottom two
Linda & Daniel	3.5	3.0	3.0	3.0	3.0	15.5	"Mickey" — Toni Basil	9.22%	2	5	7	Safe
Chris & Frankie	5.5	5.0	5.5	5.5	5.5	27.0	"Cry Me a River" — Justin Timberlake	31.03%	8	8	16	Safe

Judges' votes to save

- Barber: Steve & Susie
- Slater: Steve & Susie
- Gardiner: Steve & Susie
- Henshall: Steve & Susie
- Cousins: Steve & Susie

=== Week 6 (17 February) ===
Theme: 60's Night

Couples are listed in the order they performed.

Couple	Judges' scores					Total score	Music	Public vote	Points			Result
Couple	Barber	Slater	Gardiner	Henshall	Cousins	Total score	Music	Public vote	Judges	Public	Total	Result
Gareth & Maria	4.5	5.0	4.5	4.5	4.5	23.0	"I Get Around" — The Beach Boys	11.84%	5	3	8	Safe
Zaraah & Fred	4.5	4.0	4.5	4.5	4.5	22.0	"The Locomotion" — Little Eva	3.30%	4	1	5	Bottom two
Chris & Frankie	5.0	4.5	5.0	5.0	5.0	24.5	"My Generation" — The Who	35.33%	7	7	14	Safe
Steve & Susie	3.5	3.0	3.5	4.0	4.0	18.0	"My Girl" — The Temptations	8.33%	2	2	4	Eliminated
Suzanne & Matt	5.5	4.0	5.0	4.5	4.5	23.5	"Walk on By" — Dionne Warwick	15.41%	6	6	12	Safe
Greg & Kristina	3.5	3.0	2.5	3.5	3.5	16.0	"Hey Jude" — The Beatles	13.32%	1	5	6	Safe
Linda & Daniel	3.5	3.5	4.0	4.0	4.0	19.0	"Son of a Preacher Man" — Dusty Springfield	12.47%	3	4	7	Safe

Judges' votes to save

- Barber: Zaraah & Fred
- Slater: Zaraah & Fred
- Gardiner: Zaraah & Fred
- Henshall: Zaraah & Fred
- Cousins: Zaraah & Fred

=== Week 7 (24 February) ===
Couples are listed in the order they performed.

Couple	Judges' scores					Total score	Music	Public vote	Points			Result
Couple	Barber	Slater	Gardiner	Henshall	Cousins	Total score	Music	Public vote	Judges	Public	Total	Result
Zaraah & Fred	4.0	4.5	3.0	3.5	3.5	18.5	"Jump (For My Love)" — Girls Aloud	7.87%	2	1	3	Bottom two
Greg & Kristina	4.0	4.0	3.0	3.0	3.0	17.0	"Alright" — Supergrass	13.12%	1	4	5	Safe
Gareth & Maria	4.5	5.0	4.5	4.5	4.5	23.0	"Sweet Talkin' Woman" — Electric Light Orchestra	12.45%	4	3	7	Safe
Linda & Daniel	3.5	4.0	3.5	4.0	4.0	19.0	"Suddenly I See" — KT Tunstall	10.08%	3	2	5	Eliminated
Chris & Frankie	5.5	5.5	5.5	5.5	5.0	27.0	"Ain't No Sunshine" — Bill Withers	17.09%	5	5	10	Safe
Suzanne & Matt	5.5	5.5	5.5	5.5	5.5	27.5	"Music" — Madonna	39.39%	6	6	12	Safe

Judges' votes to save

- Barber: Zaraah & Fred
- Slater: Zaraah & Fred
- Gardiner: Zaraah & Fred
- Henshall: Zaraah & Fred
- Cousins: Zaraah & Fred

=== Week 8 (2 March) ===
Couples are listed in the order they performed.

Couple	Judges' scores					Total score	Music	Public vote	Points			Result
Couple	Barber	Slater	Gardiner	Henshall	Cousins	Total score	Music	Public vote	Judges	Public	Total	Result
Suzanne & Matt	5.0	5.5	4.5	4.5	4.5	24.0	"Don't Rain on My Parade" — Barbra Streisand	37.33%	2	5	7	Safe
Zaraah & Fred	4.5	5.0	5.0	5.0	5.0	24.5	"That Don't Impress Me Much" — Shania Twain	10.68%	3	1	4	Bottom two
Gareth & Maria	5.0	5.0	5.0	5.0	5.5	25.5	"Try a Little Tenderness" — Otis Redding	11.47%	4	2	6	Safe
Chris & Frankie	5.5	5.5	5.5	5.0	5.5	27.0	"Stuck in the Middle with You" — Stealers Wheel	27.52%	5	4	9	Safe
Greg & Kristina	4.0	4.5	4.0	4.0	4.0	20.5	"Goodbye Yellow Brick Road" — Elton John	13.00%	1	3	4	Eliminated

Judges' votes to save

- Barber: Zaraah & Fred
- Slater: Greg & Kristina
- Gardiner: Zaraah & Fred
- Henshall: Zaraah & Fred
- Cousins: Zaraah & Fred

=== Week 9 (9 March) ===
Couples are listed in the order they performed.

Couple	Judges' scores					Total score	Music	Public vote	Points			Result
Couple	Barber	Slater	Gardiner	Henshall	Cousins	Total score	Music	Public vote	Judges	Public	Total	Result
Gareth & Maria	5.0	5.5	4.5	5.0	4.5	24.5	"Livin' on a Prayer" — Bon Jovi	13.97%	1	2	3	Eliminated
Suzanne & Matt	5.5	5.5	5.5	5.5	5.5	27.5	"Eternal Flame" — The Bangles	50.47%	3	4	7	Safe
Zaraah & Fred	5.0	5.5	5.5	5.5	5.5	27.0	"One" — U2	8.60%	2	1	3	Bottom two
Chris & Frankie	5.5	6.0	5.5	6.0	6.0	29.0	"Livin' La Vida Loca" — Ricky Martin	26.97%	4	3	7	Safe

Judges' votes to save

- Barber: Zaraah & Fred
- Slater: Zaraah & Fred
- Gardiner: Zaraah & Fred
- Henshall: Zaraah & Fred
- Cousins: Zaraah & Fred

=== Week 10: Finale (16 March) ===
Couples are listed in the order they performed.

Couple	Judges' scores					Total score	Music	Public vote	Boléro	Result
Couple	Barber	Slater	Gardiner	Henshall	Cousins	Total score	Music	Public vote	Boléro	Result
Zaraah & Fred	5.5	5.0	5.0	5.0	5.5	52.5	"One Day I'll Fly Away" — Randy Crawford	7.43%		Third place
Zaraah & Fred	5.5	5.0	5.5	5.0	5.5	52.5	"Diamonds and Pearls" — Prince	7.43%		Third place
Chris & Frankie	5.5	5.5	4.5	4.5	5.5	54.5	"Fly Me to the Moon" — Frank Sinatra	23.87%	27.59%	Runners-up
Chris & Frankie	6.0	5.5	5.5	6.0	6.0	54.5	"Cry Me a River" — Justin Timberlake	23.87%	27.59%	Runners-up
Suzanne & Matt	6.0	6.0	6.0	6.0	6.0	60.0	"Time to Say Goodbye" — Sarah Brightman	68.70%	72.42%	Winners
Suzanne & Matt	6.0	6.0	6.0	6.0	6.0	60.0	"Music" — Madonna	68.70%	72.42%	Winners

== Ratings ==
Ratings sourced from BARB.

Show	Date	Official ITV1 rating (millions)	Weekly rank	Share
Live show 1	13 January	9.34	6	36.0%
Results 1	13 January	8.02	12	28.0%
Live show 2	20 January	9.33	6	37.0%
Results 2	20 January	8.34	11	30.0%
Live show 3	27 January	8.83	6	36.0%
Results 3	27 January	8.22	8	29.1%
Live show 4	3 February	9.28	6	36.0%
Results 4	3 February	8.87	7	31.0%
Live show 5	10 February	8.45	7	35.6%
Results 5	10 February	8.05	9	29.0%
Live show 6	17 February	9.13	6	38.4%
Results 6	17 February	8.47	7	29.6%
Live show 7	24 February	8.44	9	34.0%
Results 7	24 February	8.51	8	30.0%
Live show 8	2 March	9.44	6	41.0%
Results 8	2 March	8.79	7	31.0%
Semifinals	9 March	9.14	6	36.1%
Semifinals results	9 March	8.91	7	30.0%
Finale	16 March	12.08	1	44.1%
