= Dancing on Ice series 2 =

Second series of Dancing on Ice

Dancing on Ice
- Series 2
- Presented by: Phillip Schofield; Holly Willoughby
- Judges: Nicky Slater; Natalia Bestemianova; Jason Gardiner; Karen Barber; Robin Cousins
- Celebrity winner: Kyran Bracken
- Professional winner: Melanie Lambert
- No. of episodes: 18

Release
- Original network: ITV
- Original release: 20 January – 17 March 2007

Series chronology
- ← Previous; Series 1 Next → Series 3

The second series of Dancing on Ice aired from 20 January to 17 March 2007 on ITV. It was presented by Phillip Schofield and Holly Willoughby, and judged by the "Ice Panel", consisting of Nicky Slater, Natalia Bestemianova, Jason Gardiner, Karen Barber, and Robin Cousins. Jayne Torvill and Christopher Dean coached and trained the contestants. The series was won by former rugby star Kyran Bracken and his partner, Melanie Lambert.

== Judges and hosts ==
It was announced that Karen Kresge was leaving the show for unknown reasons. It was then announced that Karen Barber, Robin Cousins, Nicky Slater, and Jason Gardiner would return to the show with Natalia Bestemianova replacing Kresge. Phillip Schofield and Holly Willoughby announced their returns, along with Jayne Torvill and Christopher Dean.

== Couples ==
In this series, eleven celebrities competed, compared to ten in the first series. The contestants for the second series were:

Celebrity	Notability	Professional partner	Status
Neil "Foxy" Fox	Radio presenter & talent show judge	Pamela O'Connor	Eliminated 1st on 20 January 2007
Phil Gayle	Newsreader & freelance journalist	Natalia Pestova	Eliminated 2nd on 27 January 2007
Ulrika Jonsson	Television presenter	Pavel Aubrecht	Eliminated 3rd on 3 February 2007
Stephen Gately	Boyzone singer	Kristina Lenko	Eliminated 4th on 10 February 2007
Kay Burley	Sky newscaster	Fred Palascak	Eliminated 5th on 17 February 2007
Lisa Scott-Lee	Steps singer	Matt Evers	Eliminated 6th on 24 February 2007
Lee Sharpe	England footballer	Frankie Poultney	Eliminated 7th on 3 March 2007
Emily Symons	Home and Away & Emmerdale actress	Daniel Whiston	Eliminated 8th on 10 March 2007
Duncan James	Blue singer	Maria Filippov	Third place on 17 March 2007
Clare Buckfield	Actress	Andrei Lipanov	Runners-up on 17 March 2007
Kyran Bracken	England rugby player	Melanie Lambert	Winners on 17 March 2007

== Scoring chart ==
The highest score each week is indicated in bold green with a dagger (†), while the lowest score each week is indicated in italicized red with a double-dagger (‡).

Color key:

Winners
Runners-up
Third place
Bottom two
Eliminated

Dancing on Ice (series 2) - Weekly scores
Couple	Pl.	Week								
Couple	Pl.	1	2	3	4	5	6	7	8	9
Kyran & Melanie	1	22.0	23.0	22.5	**26.0**†	**27.0**†	**27.0**†	**28.0**†	**29.5**†	25.0+27.0=52.0‡ (Note: This couple finished in first place.)
Clare & Andrei	2	**24.5**†	**25.0**†	**25.0**†	23.5	22.0 (Note: This couple was in the bottom two, but was not eliminated.)	**27.0**†	24.5	25.5	29.5+29.5=**59.0**† (Note: This couple finished in second place.)
Duncan & Maria	3	21.0	22.0	19.5	21.5	24.5	23.5	25.5	24.5	26.0+27.0=53.0 (Note: This couple finished in third place.)
Emily & Daniel	4	19.5	18.5	20.0	23.0	19.5	18.0‡	21.5‡	22.5‡ (Note: This couple was eliminated.)	
Lee & Frankie	5	18.5	18.5	20.5	19.5	23.5	24.0	22.5		
Lisa & Matt	6	17.5	22.5	**25.0**†	23.5	24.5	23.5			
Kay & Fred	7	14.0‡	15.5	18.0	17.5	17.5‡				
Stephen & Kristina	8	14.5	15.5	16.5‡	16.5‡					
Ulrika & Pavel	9	21.0	17.5	17.5						
Phil & Natalia	10	14.5	14.5‡							
Foxy & Pam	11	15.5								

== Weekly scores ==
=== Week 1 (20 January) ===
Couples are listed in the order they performed.

Couple	Judges' scores					Total score	Music	Points			Result
Couple	Slater	Best.	Gardiner	Barber	Cousins	Total score	Music	Judges	Public	Total	Result
Lisa & Matt	3.5	4.0	3.0	3.5	3.5	17.5	"Dancing Queen" – ABBA	6	7	13	Safe
Foxy & Pam	2.5	3.5	3.5	3.0	3.0	15.5	"Beyond the Sea" – Bobby Darin	5	1	6	Eliminated
Duncan & Maria	4.5	4.5	3.5	4.5	4.0	21.0	"Last Request" – Paolo Nutini	9	8	17	Safe
Kay & Fred	3.0	3.5	2.0	2.5	3.0	14.0	"Heart of Glass" – Blondie	3	3	6	Bottom two
Kyran & Melanie	4.5	4.0	4.0	5.0	4.5	22.0	"Crazy" – Gnarls Barkley	10	11	22	Safe
Stephen & Kristina	2.5	3.5	2.5	3.0	3.0	14.5	"You're the First, the Last, My Everything" – Barry White	4	6	10	Safe
Emily & Daniel	3.5	4.5	3.5	4.5	3.5	19.5	"Copacabana" – Barry Manilow	8	9	17	Safe
Phil & Natalia	3.0	3.5	2.5	2.5	3.0	14.5	"Handbags and Gladrags" – Stereophonics	4	5	9	Safe
Clare & Andrei	5.0	5.0	4.5	5.0	5.0	24.5	"Wishin' and Hopin'" – Dusty Springfield	11	10	21	Safe
Lee & Frankie	4.0	4.0	2.5	4.0	4.0	18.5	"I Don't Feel Like Dancin'" – Scissor Sisters	7	4	11	Safe
Ulrika & Pavel	4.0	4.0	3.5	4.5	5.0	21.0	"Come Away With Me" – Norah Jones	9	2	11	Safe

Judges' votes to save

- Slater: Kay & Fred
- Bestemianova: Kay & Fred
- Gardiner: Foxy & Pam
- Barber: Kay & Fred
- Cousins: Kay & Fred

=== Week 2 (27 January) ===
Couples are listed in the order they performed.

Couple	Judges' scores					Total score	Music	Points			Result
Couple	Slater	Best.	Gardiner	Barber	Cousins	Total score	Music	Judges	Public	Total	Result
Duncan & Maria	4.0	4.5	4.5	4.5	4.5	22.0	"Bamboléo" – Gipsy Kings	7	5	12	Safe
Lee & Frankie	3.0	4.5	3.0	4.0	4.0	18.5	"Should I Stay or Should I Go" – The Clash	6	4	10	Safe
Clare & Andrei	5.0	5.0	5.0	5.0	5.0	25.0	"Like a Star" – Corinne Bailey Rae	10	8	18	Safe
Kay & Fred	2.5	3.5	2.5	3.5	3.5	15.5	"Brown Eyed Girl" – Van Morrison	4	7	11	Safe
Ulrika & Pavel	3.5	4.0	3.0	3.5	3.5	17.5	"I'm Every Woman" – Whitney Houston	5	1	6	Bottom two
Phil & Natalia	2.5	3.0	3.0	3.0	3.0	14.5	"Back for Good" – Take That	3	2	5	Eliminated
Lisa & Matt	3.5	5.0	4.5	4.5	5.0	22.5	"Ain't No Other Man" – Christina Aguilera	8	3	11	Safe
Stephen & Kristina	2.5	3.5	3.0	3.5	3.0	15.5	"Can't Get You Out of My Head" – Kylie Minogue	4	6	10	Safe
Kyran & Melanie	5.0	4.0	4.0	5.0	5.0	23.0	"Breakfast at Tiffany's" – Deep Blue Something	9	9	18	Safe
Emily & Daniel	3.0	4.0	3.5	4.0	4.0	18.5	"Buttons" – The Pussycat Dolls	6	10	16	Safe

Judges' votes to save

- Slater: Ulrika & Pavel
- Bestemianova: Ulrika & Pavel
- Gardiner: Ulrika & Pavel
- Barber: Ulrika & Pavel
- Cousins: Ulrika & Pavel

=== Week 3 (3 February) ===
Theme: Movies Week

Couples are listed in the order they performed.

Couple	Judges' scores					Total score	Music	Film	Points			Result
Couple	Slater	Best.	Gardiner	Barber	Cousins	Total score	Music	Film	Judges	Public	Total	Result
Kyran & Melanie	5.0	4.5	4.0	4.5	4.5	22.5	"Soul Bossa Nova" – Quincy Jones	Austin Powers	8	8	16	Safe
Kay & Fred	3.5	4.0	3.0	3.5	4.0	18.0	"Show Me Heaven" – Maria McKee	Days of Thunder	4	2	6	Bottom two
Stephen & Kristina	3.0	3.5	3.5	3.5	3.0	16.5	"Stayin' Alive" – Bee Gees	Saturday Night Fever	2	4	6	Safe
Lisa & Matt	5.0	5.0	5.0	5.0	5.0	25.0	"It Had to Be You" – Harry Connick Jr.	When Harry Met Sally...	9	5	14	Safe
Emily & Daniel	4.0	4.0	4.0	4.0	4.0	20.0	"Be My Baby" – The Ronettes	Dirty Dancing	6	9	15	Safe
Duncan & Maria	4.0	4.0	4.0	4.0	3.5	19.5	"Greased Lightnin'" – John Travolta	Grease	5	7	12	Safe
Lee & Frankie	4.0	4.5	3.5	4.5	4.0	20.5	"Unchained Melody" – The Righteous Brothers	Ghost	7	3	10	Safe
Ulrika & Pavel	3.5	4.0	2.5	3.5	4.0	17.5	"Oh, Pretty Woman" – Roy Orbison	Pretty Woman	3	1	4	Eliminated
Clare & Andrei	5.5	5.0	4.5	5.0	5.0	25.0	"Flashdance... What a Feeling" – Irene Cara	Flashdance	9	6	15	Safe

Judges' votes to save

- Slater: Kay & Fred
- Bestemianova: Kay & Fred
- Gardiner: Kay & Fred
- Barber: Ulrika & Pavel
- Cousins: Kay & Fred

=== Week 4 (10 February) ===
Couples are listed in the order they performed.

Couple	Judges' scores					Total score	Music	Points			Result
Couple	Slater	Best.	Gardiner	Barber	Cousins	Total score	Music	Judges	Public	Total	Result
Emily & Daniel	4.0	4.5	4.5	5.0	5.0	23.0	"Almaz" – Randy Crawford	6	7	13	Safe
Lee & Frankie	4.0	4.0	3.5	4.0	4.0	19.5	"I Want to Break Free" – Queen	4	1	5	Bottom two
Lisa & Matt	4.5	5.0	5.0	4.5	4.5	23.5	"The Closest Thing to Crazy" – Katie Melua	7	4	11	Safe
Stephen & Kristina	3.0	3.5	3.0	3.5	3.5	16.5	"I'm Your Man" – Wham!	2	2	4	Eliminated
Clare & Andrei	5.5	5.0	4.5	4.5	4.0	23.5	"Love Don't Cost A Thing" – Jennifer Lopez	7	6	13	Safe
Kay & Fred	3.5	4.0	3.0	3.5	3.5	17.5	"That's Amore" – Dean Martin	3	3	6	Safe
Kyran & Melanie	5.5	5.0	5.0	5.5	5.0	26.0	"Chasing Cars" – Snow Patrol	8	8	16	Safe
Duncan & Maria	5.0	4.0	4.0	4.5	4.0	21.5	"Can You Feel It" – The Jacksons	5	5	10	Safe

Judges' votes to save

- Slater: Lee & Frankie
- Bestemianova: Lee & Frankie
- Gardiner: Lee & Frankie
- Barber: Lee & Frankie
- Cousins: Lee & Frankie

=== Week 5 (17 February) ===
Theme: Country Western Night

Couples are listed in the order they performed.

Couple	Judges' scores					Total score	Music	Points			Result
Couple	Slater	Best.	Gardiner	Barber	Cousins	Total score	Music	Judges	Public	Total	Result
Clare & Andrei	4.0	4.5	4.0	4.5	5.0	22.0	"Crazy" – Patsy Cline	4	1	5	Bottom two
Duncan & Maria	5.0	5.0	4.5	5.0	5.0	24.5	"Rhinestone Cowboy" – Glen Campbell	6	5	11	Safe
Kay & Fred	3.5	3.5	3.5	3.5	3.5	17.5	"Stand by Your Man" – Tammy Wynette	2	2	4	Eliminated
Emily & Daniel	3.5	4.0	3.5	4.5	4.0	19.5	"9 to 5" – Dolly Parton	3	6	9	Safe
Lee & Frankie	4.5	4.0	5.0	5.0	5.0	23.5	"King of the Road" – Roger Miller	5	3	8	Safe
Lisa & Matt	4.5	5.5	5.0	5.0	4.5	24.5	"Man! I Feel Like a Woman!" – Shaina Twain	6	4	10	Safe
Kyran & Melanie	5.0	5.5	5.5	5.5	5.5	27.0	"Rawhide" – Frankie Laine	7	7	14	Safe

Judges' votes to save

- Slater: Clare & Andrei
- Bestemianova: Clare & Andrei
- Gardiner: Clare & Andrei
- Barber: Clare & Andrei
- Cousins: Clare & Andrei

=== Week 6 (24 February) ===
Couples are listed in the order they performed.

Couple	Judges' scores					Total score	Music	Points			Result
Couple	Slater	Best.	Gardiner	Barber	Cousins	Total score	Music	Judges	Public	Total	Result
Duncan & Maria	4.5	5.0	4.5	5.0	4.5	23.5	"Reet Petite" – Jackie Wilson	4	2	6	Bottom two
Emily & Daniel	3.5	4.0	3.5	3.5	3.5	18.0	"Ev'ry Time We Say Goodbye" – Cole Porter	3	4	7	Safe
Lee & Frankie	4.5	4.5	5.0	5.0	5.0	24.0	"Hero" – Enrique Iglesias	5	3	8	Safe
Clare & Andrei	5.0	5.5	5.5	5.5	5.5	27.0	"Since U Been Gone" – Kelly Clarkson	6	6	12	Safe
Kyran & Melanie	5.5	5.5	5.0	5.5	5.5	27.0	"I'll Be There For You" – The Rembrandts	6	5	11	Safe
Lisa & Matt	4.0	4.5	5.0	5.0	5.0	23.5	"Smooth" – Santana	4	1	5	Eliminated

Judges' votes to save

- Slater: Duncan & Maria
- Bestemianova: Duncan & Maria
- Gardiner: Lisa & Matt
- Barber: Duncan & Maria
- Cousins: Duncan & Maria

=== Week 7 (3 March) ===
Theme: Prop Night

Couples are listed in the order they performed.

Couple	Judges' scores					Total score	Music	Prop	Points			Result
Couple	Slater	Best.	Gardiner	Barber	Cousins	Total score	Music	Prop	Judges	Public	Total	Result
Clare & Andrei	5.0	5.0	4.5	5.0	5.0	24.5	"Perhaps, Perhaps, Perhaps" – Doris Day	Chair	3	1	4	Bottom two
Lee & Frankie	5.0	4.0	4.0	5.0	4.5	22.5	"Your Song" – Elton John	Broom	2	2	4	Eliminated
Emily & Daniel	4.5	4.5	3.5	4.5	4.5	21.5	"They Can't Take That Away from Me" – Bing Crosby	Hat	1	4	5	Safe
Kyran & Melanie	6.0	5.5	5.5	5.5	5.5	28.0	"Hello, Goodbye" – The Beatles	Suitcase	5	5	10	Safe
Duncan & Maria	5.5	5.0	5.0	5.0	5.0	25.5	"Mr. Blue Sky" – E.L.O.	Umbrella	4	3	7	Safe

Judges' votes to save

- Slater: Clare & Andrei
- Bestemianova: Clare & Andrei
- Gardiner: Clare & Andrei
- Barber: Clare & Andrei
- Cousins: Clare & Andrei

=== Week 8 (Semifinals) ===
Couples are listed in the order they performed.

Couple	Judges' scores					Total score	Music	Points			Result
Couple	Slater	Best.	Gardiner	Barber	Cousins	Total score	Music	Judges	Public	Total	Result
Duncan & Maria	4.5	5.0	5.0	5.0	5.0	24.5	"I Still Haven't Found What I'm Looking For" – U2	2	1	3	Bottom two
Clare & Andrei	5.0	5.0	4.5	5.5	5.5	25.5	"Ain't No Mountain High Enough" – Diana Ross	3	2	5	Safe
Emily & Daniel	4.5	4.5	4.5	4.5	4.5	22.5	"I'll Stand By You" – Girls Aloud	1	3	4	Eliminated
Kyran & Melanie	5.5	6.0	6.0	6.0	6.0	29.5	"Billie Jean" – Michael Jackson	4	4	8	Safe

Judges' votes to save

- Slater: Duncan & Maria
- Bestemianova: Duncan & Maria
- Gardiner: Duncan & Maria
- Barber: Duncan & Maria
- Cousins: Duncan & Maria

=== Week 9 (Finals) ===
Couples are listed in the order they performed.

Couple	Judges' scores					Total score	Music	Boléro	Result
Couple	Slater	Best.	Gardiner	Barber	Cousins	Total score	Music	Boléro	Result
Kyran & Melanie	5.0	5.5	5.0	4.5	5.0	52.0	"Come Fly with Me" – Frank Sinatra	72.28%	Winners
Kyran & Melanie	5.5	5.5	5.5	5.5	5.0	52.0	"Chasing Cars" – Snow Patrol	72.28%	Winners
Clare & Andrei	6.0	6.0	5.5	6.0	6.0	59.0	"We've Only Just Begun" – The Carpenters	27.72%	Runners-up
Clare & Andrei	5.5	6.0	6.0	6.0	6.0	59.0	"Since U Been Gone" – Kelly Clarkson	27.72%	Runners-up
Duncan & Maria	5.5	5.0	5.0	5.0	5.5	53.0	"Don't Let the Sun Go Down on Me" – Elton John		Third place
Duncan & Maria	5.0	5.0	6.0	5.5	5.5	53.0	"Bamboléo" – Gipsy Kings		Third place

== Ratings ==
Show	Date	Official ITV1 rating (millions)	Weekly rank	Share
Live show 1	20 January	9.08	7	38.8%
Results 1	20 January	6.14	17	23.6%
Live show 2	27 January	8.82	7	38.5%
Results 2	27 January	6.20	17	27.0%
Live show 3	3 February	9.21	6	40.2%
Results 3	3 February	6.11	20	25.0%
Live show 4	10 February	9.16	7	40.3%
Results 4	10 February	6.58	17	26.6%
Live show 5	17 February	8.11	10	36.1%
Results 5	17 February	7.06	16	29.7%
Live show 6	24 February	9.05	6	37.0%
Results 6	24 February	7.67	15	31.5%
Live show 7	3 March	9.25	6	40.8%
Results 7	3 March	7.41	15	31.3%
Semi-final	10 March	8.03	11	36.0%
Semi-final results	10 March	6.97	14	28.0%
Final	17 March	10.04	4	44.0%
Final results	17 March	9.14	6	36.0%
