= Colin Ratushniak =

Canadian ice skater and politician

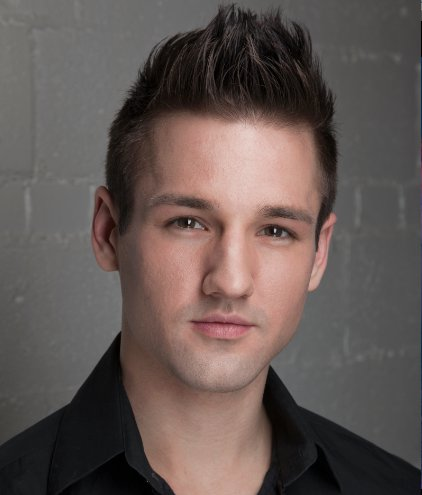

Mayor of La Ronge, Saskatchewan
- In office 9 November 2020 – 19 July 2022
- Preceded by: Ron Woytowich
- Succeeded by: Viviana Ruiz-Arcand

Personal details
- Born: 18 August 1985 (age 40) Gillam, Manitoba, Canada
- Occupation: Pilot, fitness supervisor, skating coach

Colin Ratushniak (born 18 August 1985) is a Canadian professional ice skater and politician who appeared in the TV show Dancing on Ice in 2011, with celebrity skating partner Laura Hamilton. In September 2012, Ratushniak attained a two-year visa and moved to the UK to concentrate on building a career in TV production. In November 2020, he was elected the mayor of the town of La Ronge, Saskatchewan.

== Background ==
Born in Gillam, Manitoba in Canada, Ratushniak began skating at the age of two. He played ice hockey until he was 12 years old, at which point he began making the transition from hockey player to ice skater. When his family moved to Brandon, he continued training and began his competitive career.

== Competitive career ==
From 1998 to 2002, Ratushniak reigned as the province of Manitoba's men's novice champion. He also won a pre-novice bronze medal at the Junior National Championships in 2000.

== Professional skating career ==
=== 2003–2010 ===
In 2003, after graduating from high school, Ratushniak turned professional and joined Feld Entertainment to skate in the critically acclaimed Disney on Ice productions, touring the UK in 2008 with the show "High School Musical." For the next 8 years he continued to tour, working with illustrious names such as Rand Productions and Karen Kresge Productions, to date performing in over 50 countries and 500 major cities across 5 continents. During this time he also developed his skills as a pairs skater, pairing up with Amanda Frank and Isabelle Gauthier. In 2010, at age 24, Ratushniak performed his first backflip on the ice.

Year	Show	Country
2010	Spellbound on Ice	Hong Kong
2010	Snoopy Rocks on Ice	Canada
2010	Elemental	Canada
2010	Magic on Ice	Mexico
2009	Ice Odyssey	Hong Kong
2009	Endless Summer on Ice	Canada
2003–2008	Monsters Inc.	Around the world
2003–2008	100 Years of Magic	Around the world
2003–2008	High School Musical – The Ice Tour	Around the world

=== 2011 ===
==== Dancing on Ice ====
In January 2011, Ratushniak took his first foray into the world of prime time TV when he appeared as a professional skater in series 6 of the UK TV show Dancing on Ice with celebrity partner, Laura Hamilton and the couple were early favourites to win the series. They eventually finished runners up in the series to Brianne Delcourt and Sam Attwater and went on to perform in cities across the UK with the Dancing on Ice Live Tour.

===== Performances/results =====
Key	TC = Team Challenge	SO = Skate Off	DP = Double Points

Week	Song	Artist	Score	Leaderboard
Qualifier 1	"My Life Would Suck Without You"	Kelly Clarkson	16	1st – SO
Qualifier 2	N/A	N/A	N/A	N/A
1	"All the Lovers"	Kylie Minogue	19.5	=2nd
2	"Whenever Wherever"	Shakira	20	2nd
3	"It's All Coming Back to Me Now"	Celine Dion	24	2nd
4	"You Can't Stop the Beat"	Cast of Hairspray	25.5	1st
5	"Stop"	Sam Brown	25.5	1st
6	"Upside Down"	Paloma Faith	24.5	=2nd – SO
7	"I'm So Excited"	Pointer Sisters	28.5	1st
TC	"Rockin' All Over the World"	Status Quo	57 (DP)	1st
8	"Rolling in the Deep"	The Overtones	25.5	2nd
Semi-final	"The Last Dance"	Clare Maguire	28.0	2nd
Semi-final	"These Boots Are Made for Walkin'"	Jessica Simpson	26.5	2nd
Final	"Express Yourself"	Madonna	26	Runner-up
Final	"I'm So Excited"	Pointer Sisters	30	Runner-up
Final	Boléro	Ravel	N/A	Runner-up

==== Beyond Broadway ====
In August and September 2011, Ratushniak performed alongside Olympic figure skating champion Joannie Rochette in the show Beyond Broadway at the Canadian National Exhibition (CNE). Performing with professional partner Isabelle Gauthier, they skated to the song "Seasons of Love" from the Broadway musical Rent, as well as joining the rest of cast for other routines.

==== Tropicana – The Passion Tour ====
The end of 2011 and the beginning of 2012 saw Ratushniak performing in the Holiday on Ice show, Tropicana. Running from December 2011 until February 2012 across The Netherlands and the UK, the show was created and choreographed by Olympic champion Robin Cousins MBE and featured music from singer Barry Manilow. The show premiered in Eindhoven and went on to play in Amsterdam, Maastricht, Utrecht, Zwolle, Brighton, Peterborough, Cardiff and Exeter.

=== 2012 ===
==== Skating on Broadway ====
In March 2012, Ratushniak travelled to Irapuato in Mexico to perform in the Ucha Atayde Entertainment production of Skating on Broadway. The show's cast performed to a selection of songs from Broadway musicals with Ratushniak taking the starring role in the sections for Rent and Lion King. He returned to Mexico in April 2012 and again in June 2012 this time performing the show in the cities of Villahermosa and Durango respectively. During the latter period he took on the additional role of Company Manager, responsible for co-ordinating all aspects of the show's production.

==== Quebec club shows ====
In between his shows in Mexico, Ratushniak joined forces with pro partner Isabelle Gauthier once again to perform as guests in the Annual Gala shows of skating clubs in Quebec. As well as their Seasons of Love routine from the show Beyond Broadway, Ratushniak and Gauthier performed a new routine that they'd choreographed especially for the shows, skating to the song "Moves Like Jagger". The shows took place at skating clubs in Charny, Abénakis and Lac-Mégantic.

==== Rock on Ice ====
In April 2012 and again in June 2012 Ratushniak performed in the production of Rock on Ice, a show which ran alongside the production Skating on Broadway. He joined the cast for the show's run in the cities of Villahermosa and Durango in Mexico performing as both a soloist and member of the ensemble to songs from rock legends including ZZ Top, Van Halen, Pink Floyd and Queen. His role as Company Manager whilst in Durango encompassed both shows.

==== Kyran Bracken's Ice Party ====
After moving to the UK permanently in September 2012, Ratushniak performed for the first time with professional skater, Patti Petrus, at Kyran's Bracken's Ice Party in Blackpool. The show took place from 1 to 3 November with Ratushniak and Petrus skating pairs routines alongside other professional skaters Karen Barber, Daniel Whiston and Brianne Delcourt.

==== Stars on Ice Australia ====
In November 2012 Ratushniak travelled to Singapore to perform in the Stars on Ice Australia Christmas Gala shows which took place in Novena Square. He performed in the show as a soloist as well as pairs. The show ran from 24 November until 23 December.

=== 2013 ===
==== Celebrities on Ice ====
Performing alongside TV personality Chico Slimani, England Rugby legend Kyran Bracken, West End star Ray Quinn and the world-famous Russian Ice Stars, Ratushniak starred in the show Celebrities on Ice in January 2013. Held at Peterborough Arena from 25 to 27 January, the show was hosted by celebrity Christopher Biggins. The show subsequently embarked on a UK nationwide arena tour from April until June 2013 where he performed alongside Dancing on Ice celebrities Beth Tweddle, Matthew Lapinskas and Gareth Thomas and professional skaters Daniel Whiston, Brianne Delcourt and Jenna Nicole Smith.

==== Stars on Ice Australia ====
Ratushniak ended the year with a return to Singapore to perform once again at the Velocity Christmas shows held in Novena Square. The show, produced by Stars on Ice Australia, ran from 26 November to 22 December and featured a mix of popular music and classic Christmas songs performed by a cast of three professional skaters.

=== 2014 ===
==== Skate in the City ====
Taking place at Broadgate Ice Rink and hosted by Southend Airport, Ratushniak performed alongside English rugby player and Dancing on Ice star Kyran Bracken, X factor contestant Chico, Eastenders and Dancing on Ice contestant Matt Lapinskas, and the Russian Ice Stars in a one-off outdoor event, Skate in the City.

==== Val-Bélair Gala Show ====
Ratushniak was reunited with pro skating partner Isabelle Gauthier on 5 April to perform at the Val-Bélair Gala Show in Quebec. The pair skated their Seasons of Love and Moves Like Jagger routines at the show; the first they had paired up for since March 2013.

== Filmography ==
Year	Month	Title	Agency
2013	November	Love Always Wins	All Out

== TV production ==
Production	Role	Company	Channel
Canada Sings	Talent Wrangler	Insight Productions	Global Television Network
The Juno Awards 2012	Production Assistant	Insight Productions	CTV Television Network
Battle of the Blades	Floor Manager	CBC	CTV Television Network
The Million Pound Drop Live	Runner	Endemol Group	Channel 4
The Big Decision	Runner	RDF Television	Channel 4
The Brit List	Junior Researcher	Mighty Fine Productions	BBC America
National Lottery Awards	Runner	BBC	BBC One
Hoods Ft Rita Ora	Runner	MTV USA	MTV
Loose Women	Assistant Floor Manager	ITV Studios	ITV
Celebrity Big Brother's Bit on the Side	Researcher	Endemol Group	Channel 5
8 Out of 10 Cats	Studio Runner	Zepp	Channel 4
Basketball Wives	Location Assistant	Shed Media	VH1
Big Brother's Bit on the Side	Celebrity Booker / Researcher	Endemol Group	Channel 5
Battle of the Blades	Assistant Producer	Insight Productions	CBC Television
Celebrity Big Brother's Bit on the Side	Celebrity Booker / Researcher	Endemol Group	Channel 5
My Gay Wedding: The Musical	AP (Self Shooting)	Wingspan Productions	Channel 4
30 Days of Beauty	Assistant Producer	Flare	Canada
Barclays – Digital Eagles	Casting Assistant Producer	Pulse Films	Various

== Other interests ==
As well as being a professional ice skater, Ratushniak is also a qualified pilot and licensed property developer.

Ratushniak was elected mayor of the northern town of La Ronge, Saskatchewan in November 2020, making him the first openly gay mayor in La Ronge's history. He resigned his position in July 2022 to pursue a career as a commercial pilot.
