= Dancing on Ice series 1 =

First series of Dancing on Ice

Dancing on Ice
- Series 1
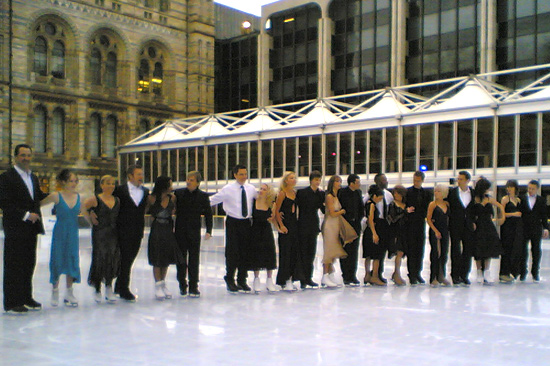
- The ten couples from the first series
- Presented by: Phillip Schofield; Holly Willoughby
- Judges: Nicky Slater; Karen Kresge; Jason Gardiner; Karen Barber; Robin Cousins
- Celebrity winner: Gaynor Faye
- Professional winner: Daniel Whiston
- No. of episodes: 16

Release
- Original network: ITV
- Original release: 14 January – 4 March 2006

Series chronology
- Next → Series 2

The first series of Dancing on Ice aired from 14 January to 4 March 2006 on ITV. It was presented by Phillip Schofield and Holly Willoughby, and judged by the "Ice Panel", consisting of Nicky Slater, Karen Kresge, Jason Gardiner, Karen Barber and Robin Cousins. Jayne Torvill and Christopher Dean coached and trained the contestants.

== Judges and hosts ==
The judging panel was announced as Nicky Slater, Karen Kresge, Jason Gardiner, Karen Barber, and Robin Cousins. Cousins was announced as head judge, while Holly Willoughby and Phillip Schofield were announced as hosts, with Jayne Torvill and Christopher Dean as coaches.

== Couples ==
The ten celebrities and professional ice skaters were:

Celebrity	Notability	Professional partner	Status
Tamara Beckwith	Socialite	Sergey Malyshev	Eliminated 1st on 14 January 2006
Andi Peters	Television presenter	Tamara Sharp	Eliminated 2nd on 21 January 2006
Andrea McLean	GMTV weather presenter	Doug Webster	Eliminated 3rd on 28 January 2006
John Barrowman	Actor & singer	Olga Sharutenko	Eliminated 4th on 4 February 2006
Sean Wilson	Coronation Street actor	Marika Humphreys	Eliminated 5th on 11 February 2006
Kelly Holmes	Olympic middle-distance runner	Todd Sand	Eliminated 6th on 18 February 2006
David Seaman	England goalkeeper	Pam O'Connor; Natalia Pestova (Week 4)	Eliminated 7th on 25 February 2006
Bonnie Langford	Actress & West End dancer	Matt Evers	Third place on 4 March 2006
Stefan Booth	Actor	Kristina Lenko	Runners-up on 4 March 2006
Gaynor Faye	Coronation Street actress	Daniel Whiston	Winners on 4 March 2006

== Scoring chart ==
The highest score each week is indicated in bold green with a dagger (†), while the lowest score each week is indicated in italicized red with a double-dagger (‡).

Color key:

Winners
Runners-up
Third place
Bottom two
Excused from competition for the week
Eliminated

Dancing on Ice (series 1) - Weekly scores
Couple	Pl.	Week							
Couple	Pl.	1	2	3	4	5	6	7	8
Gaynor & Daniel	1	15.5 (Note: This couple was in the bottom two, but was not eliminated.)	17.5	20.5	23.5	20.0	23.5	**26.5**†	25.0+27.0=52.0 (Note: This couple finished in first place.)
Stefan & Kristina	2	17.5	17.5	18.0	18.0	20.0	25.5	23.5	25.5+25.0=50.5‡ (Note: This couple finished in second place.)
Bonnie & Matt	3	**21.5**†	**23.5**†	21.5	**27.0**†	21.5	**27.0**†	23.5	28.5+27.5=**56.0**† (Note: This couple finished in third place.)
David & Pam	4	16.0	20.5	17.5‡	16.0‡	**22.5**†		21.5‡ (Note: This couple was eliminated.)	
Kelly & Todd	5	14.5	13.5	18.5	17.5	19.0	22.0‡		
Sean & Marika	6	18.0	17.5	18.5	17.5	18.5‡			
John & Olga	7	21.0	22.0	**22.0**†	21.5				
Andrea & Doug	8	16.5	14.5	18.0					
Andi & Tamara	9	11.0‡	11.0‡						
Tamara & Sergey	10	13.5							

== Weekly scores ==
=== Week 1 (14 January) ===
Couples are listed in the order they performed.

Couple	Judges' scores					Total score	Music	Result
Couple	Slater	Kresge	Gardiner	Barber	Cousins	Total score	Music	Result
Sean & Marika	4.0	3.0	2.5	4.5	4.0	18.0	"A Little Less Conversation" — Elvis Presley vs. JXL	Safe
Gaynor & Daniel	2.5	3.5	3.0	3.5	3.0	15.5	"You're Beautiful" — James Blunt	Bottom two
Stefan & Kristina	4.5	3.0	2.5	4.0	3.5	17.5	"Young Hearts Run Free" — Candi Staton	Safe
Bonnie & Matt	5.0	4.0	4.5	3.5	4.5	21.5	"Mad About the Boy" — Julie London	Safe
Andi & Tamara	1.5	2.5	1.5	3.0	2.5	11.0	"I Love to Boogie" — T. Rex	Safe
Andrea & Doug	3.5	2.5	2.5	4.0	4.0	16.5	"Crazy in Love" — Beyoncé, feat. Jay-Z	Safe
David & Pam	3.0	3.0	3.0	4.0	3.0	16.0	"Wild Thing" — The Troggs	Safe
Tamara & Sergey	2.0	2.5	3.0	3.5	2.5	13.5	"Get the Party Started" — Pink	Eliminated
John & Olga	4.0	4.0	4.0	4.5	4.5	21.0	"A Fifth of Beethoven" — Walter Murphy and the Big Apple Band	Safe
Kelly & Todd	1.5	3.5	2.5	4.0	3.0	14.5	"...Baby One More Time" — Britney Spears	Safe

Judges' votes to save

- Slater: Gaynor & Daniel
- Kresge: Gaynor & Daniel
- Gardiner: Gaynor & Daniel
- Barber: Gaynor & Daniel
- Cousins: Gaynor & Daniel

=== Week 2 (21 January) ===
Couples are listed in the order they performed.

Couple	Judges' scores					Total score	Music	Result
Couple	Slater	Kresge	Gardiner	Barber	Cousins	Total score	Music	Result
John & Olga	4.5	4.0	4.0	5.0	4.5	22.0	"Is This the Way to Amarillo" — Tony Christie	Safe
Andrea & Doug	3.0	2.5	2.0	3.5	3.5	14.5	"It's Oh So Quiet" — Björk	Safe
David & Pam	4.0	3.5	4.5	4.5	4.0	20.5	"A Groovy Kind of Love" — Phil Collins	Safe
Gaynor & Daniel	3.0	3.5	3.0	4.0	4.0	17.5	"Love Shack" — The B-52s	Safe
Stefan & Kristina	4.0	3.0	3.5	4.0	3.0	17.5	"Rock DJ" — Robbie Williams	Bottom two
Kelly & Todd	2.5	3.5	2.0	3.0	2.5	13.5	"You Raise Me Up" — Westlife	Safe
Andi & Tamara	2.0	2.0	1.5	3.0	2.5	11.0	"Hung Up" — Madonna	Eliminated
Bonnie & Matt	5.0	4.5	4.5	4.5	5.0	23.5	"Hot Honey Rag" — from Chicago	Safe
Sean & Marika	3.5	3.0	3.5	3.5	4.0	17.5	"Tainted Love" — Soft Cell	Safe

Judges' votes to save

- Slater: Stefan & Kristina
- Kresge: Stefan & Kristina
- Gardiner: Andi & Tamara
- Barber: Andi & Tamara
- Cousins: Stefan & Kristina

=== Week 3 (28 January) ===
Couples are listed in the order they performed.

Couple	Judges' scores					Total score	Music	Result
Couple	Slater	Kresge	Gardiner	Barber	Cousins	Total score	Music	Result
Bonnie & Matt	4.0	4.5	4.0	4.5	4.5	21.5	"I Will Survive" — Gloria Gaynor	Safe
David & Pam	3.5	3.5	3.0	4.5	3.0	17.5	"Crocodile Rock" — Elton John	Safe
Andrea & Doug	3.5	3.5	3.5	4.0	3.5	18.0	"Time After Time" — Eva Cassidy	Eliminated
Stefan & Kristina	3.5	3.5	3.0	4.0	4.0	18.0	"I Got You (I Feel Good)" — James Brown	Bottom two
Gaynor & Daniel	5.0	4.0	3.5	4.5	3.5	20.5	"Baby Love" — The Supremes	Safe
Sean & Marika	2.5	3.5	4.5	3.5	4.5	18.5	"She's Always a Woman" — Billy Joel	Safe
Kelly & Todd	3.0	4.5	3.5	3.5	4.0	18.5	"All That Jazz" — Catherine Zeta-Jones	Safe
John & Olga	5.0	4.0	3.5	5.0	4.5	22.0	"Black Horse and the Cherry Tree" — KT Tunstall	Safe

Judges' votes to save

- Slater: Stefan & Kristina
- Kresge: Stefan & Kristina
- Gardiner: Andrea & Doug
- Barber: Stefan & Kristina
- Cousins: Stefan & Kristina

=== Week 4 (4 February) ===
Theme: Las Vegas Night

Couples are listed in the order they performed.

Couple	Judges' scores					Total score	Music	Result
Couple	Slater	Kresge	Gardiner	Barber	Cousins	Total score	Music	Result
John & Olga	4.0	4.0	4.0	5.0	4.5	21.5	"Suspicious Minds" — Elvis Presley	Eliminated
Gaynor & Daniel	4.5	4.5	5.0	4.5	5.0	23.5	"My Heart Will Go On" — Celine Dion	Safe
Stefan & Kristina	3.5	4.0	3.5	4.0	3.0	18.0	"Luck Be a Lady" — Frank Sinatra	Bottom two
Bonnie & Matt	5.5	5.0	5.5	5.5	5.5	27.0	"Big Spender" — from Sweet Charity	Safe
Sean & Marika	4.0	3.5	3.5	3.5	3.0	17.5	"Mack the Knife" — Bobby Darin	Safe
Kelly & Todd	3.5	3.5	2.5	3.5	3.5	17.5	"Believe" — Cher	Safe
David & Natalia	3.0	3.5	2.5	3.5	3.5	16.0	"It's Not Unusual" — Tom Jones	Safe

Judges' votes to save

- Slater: Stefan & Kristina
- Kresge: Stefan & Kristina
- Gardiner: John & Olga
- Barber: John & Olga
- Cousins: Stefan & Kristina

=== Week 5 (11 February) ===
Couples are listed in the order they performed.

Couple	Judges' scores					Total score	Music	Result
Couple	Slater	Kresge	Gardiner	Barber	Cousins	Total score	Music	Result
Gaynor & Daniel	4.0	3.5	3.5	4.5	4.5	20.0	"Holding Out for a Hero" — Bonnie Tyler	Safe
Sean & Marika	4.0	3.5	3.5	4.0	3.5	18.5	"Relight My Fire" — Take That & Lulu	Eliminated
Kelly & Todd	4.0	3.5	3.5	4.0	4.0	19.0	"What a Wonderful World" — Louis Armstrong	Bottom two
David & Pam	4.5	4.5	4.5	4.0	5.0	22.5	"All Time Love" — Will Young	Safe
Bonnie & Matt	5.0	4.0	4.0	4.5	4.0	21.5	"Push the Button" — Sugababes	Safe
Stefan & Kristina	4.5	4.0	3.0	4.0	4.5	20.0	"Fever" — Peggy Lee	Safe

Judges' votes to save

- Slater: Sean & Marika
- Kresge: Kelly & Todd
- Gardiner: Kelly & Todd
- Barber: Kelly & Todd
- Cousins: Kelly & Todd

=== Week 6 (18 February) ===
Couples are listed in the order they performed.

Couple	Judges' scores					Total score	Music	Prop	Result
Couple	Slater	Kresge	Gardiner	Barber	Cousins	Total score	Music	Prop	Result
Bonnie & Matt	5.0	5.5	5.5	5.5	5.5	27.0	"Material Girl" — Madonna	Feather Boa	Bottom two
Stefan & Kristina	5.5	5.5	4.5	5.0	5.0	25.5	"Mr. Bojangles" — Sammy Davis Jr.	Broom	Safe
Kelly & Todd	4.5	5.0	3.5	4.5	4.5	22.0	"Cabaret" — from Cabaret	Chair	Eliminated
Gaynor & Daniel	5.0	4.5	4.5	5.0	4.5	23.5	"You Can Leave Your Hat On" — Joe Cocker	Hat	Safe

Judges' votes to save

- Slater: Bonnie & Matt
- Kresge: Bonnie & Matt
- Gardiner: Bonnie & Matt
- Barber: Bonnie & Matt
- Cousins: Bonnie & Matt

=== Week 7 (25 February) ===
Couples are listed in the order they performed.

Couple	Judges' scores					Total score	Music	Result
Couple	Slater	Kresge	Gardiner	Barber	Cousins	Total score	Music	Result
Stefan & Kristina	4.5	4.5	4.5	5.0	5.0	23.5	"Don't Stop Me Now" — Queen	Safe
Gaynor & Daniel	5.5	5.0	5.0	5.5	5.5	26.5	"(I've Had) The Time of My Life" — Bill Medley & Jennifer Warnes	Safe
David & Pam	4.5	4.0	4.0	4.5	4.5	21.5	"I Don't Want to Miss a Thing" — Aerosmith	Eliminated
Bonnie & Matt	4.5	4.5	4.5	5.0	5.0	23.5	"Can't Take My Eyes Off You" — Andy Williams	Bottom two

Judges' votes to save

- Slater: Bonnie & Matt
- Kresge: Bonnie & Matt
- Gardiner: Bonnie & Matt
- Barber: Bonnie & Matt
- Cousins: Bonnie & Matt

=== Week 8 (4 March) ===
Couples are listed in the order they performed.

Couple	Judges' scores					Total score	Music	Result
Couple	Slater	Kresge	Gardiner	Barber	Cousins	Total score	Music	Result
Bonnie & Matt	6.0	6.0	5.5	5.5	5.5	28.5	"Love Is in the Air" — John Paul Young	Third place
Bonnie & Matt	5.0	5.5	5.5	5.5	6.0	27.5	"Big Spender" — from Sweet Charity	Third place
Stefan & Kristina	5.0	5.0	5.0	5.5	5.0	25.5	"Flying Without Wings" — Westlife	Runners-up
Stefan & Kristina	4.5	4.5	5.5	5.0	5.5	25.0	"Fever" — Peggy Lee	Runners-up
Gaynor & Daniel	5.0	5.0	5.0	5.5	4.5	25.0	"Angels" — Robbie Williams	Winners
Gaynor & Daniel	5.0	5.5	5.5	5.5	5.5	27.0	"My Heart Will Go On" — Celine Dion	Winners

== Ratings ==
Show	Date	Official ITV1 rating (millions)	Weekly rank	Share
Live show 1	14 January	9.83	6	43.0%
Results 1	14 January	6.73	19	28.0%
Live show 2	21 January	9.08	9	41.0%
Results 2	21 January	7.06	15	28.0%
Live show 3	28 January	8.58	13	38.2%
Results 3	28 January	7.27	15	28.6%
Live show 4	4 February	9.85	7	43.0%
Results 4	4 February	8.22	15	34.0%
Live show 5	11 February	9.96	5	43.0%
Results 5	11 February	8.54	12	33.0%
Live show 6	18 February	9.56	6	41.1%
Results 6	18 February	8.83	11	35.9%
Semi-final	25 February	10.47	6	45.0%
Semi-final results	25 February	8.88	10	35.0%
Final	4 March	11.34	6	46.8%
Final results	4 March	11.68	5	43.8%
