= The Oxford Freestylers =

- Origin: Oxfordshire, England
- Years active: 2009–present
- Members: Jordan Heeley; Wayne Oliver; Andrew Hastings; Lawrence Orsborn; Aiden DiToro
- Past members: Robert David Firkins; Joey Tsang; Ricky Venn

The Oxford Freestylers is the team name for a group of young freestyle ice skaters that were formed in Oxford. They were crowned champions on the 4th season of Torvill and Dean's Dancing on Ice: Ice Star in 2009, where they were to perform in front of 13 million people on live television on the celebrity final of the show. In addition, The Oxford Freestylers went on to perform to a live audience of 42 thousand on the Dancing on Ice Tour at the Wembley Arena.

== Background ==
The Oxford Freestylers were formed initially under the love of the same hobby. Curious to the limits of their own skills and others that were unknown to them, the Oxford Freestylers would go in search of a challenge to their skill in the surrounding counties.

== Dancing on Ice: Ice Star (2009) ==
The Oxford Freestylers auditioned for the 4th series of Torvill and Dean's Dancing on Ice: Ice Star in 2009. Torvill and Dean's nationwide search for an Ice Star was an invitation for thousands of talented ice performers to bring their skills to the "frozen stage".

Making their way through the first round of the auditions and onto Torvill and Dean's shortlisted 20 they then carried on to making the final 4 selections of the competition.

- Hannah and Daniel - Junior Pairs Skaters.
- Nick Rigby - Figure Skater.
- Oxford Freestylers - Extreme Freestyle Ice Skaters.
- The Elody - Skating Girlband.

Each of the 4 groups were aided by professional choreographers and trainers to help them produce a winning routine for the grand final of Ice Star.

After weeks of training and choreography with the help of Mark Naylor, The Oxford Freestylers were crowned the winners of Ice Star, performing to Kanye West's Stronger.

=== Performances on Dancing on Ice ===
The Oxford Freestylers were featured on the Dancing on Ice: Ice Star spin-off series and performed on the Dancing on Ice Live Celebrity Final. Each routine was performed to the following songs:

Week	Song choice	Original artist	Result
Week 1	"Freestyler"	Bomfunk MCs	Safe
Week 2	"Freestyler"	Bomfunk MCs	Safe
Week 3	"Stronger"	Kanye West	Safe
Week 4	"Pump It"	The Black Eyed Peas	Celebrity Final

== Post Dancing on Ice: Ice Star ==
The Oxford Freestylers were invited to perform on Torvill and Dean's Live Tour for the Wembley Arena dates. Suffering from injuries prior to the performance they were limited to performing with only 4 of the original 6 members.

Following The Oxford Freestyler's debut on Dancing on Ice: Ice Star, the Oxford Freestylers have continued to train at their local ice rink. They have held performances for their home hockey team (The Oxford City Stars) and have been involved in charity fund raising activities. Robert Firkins left the group circa July 2009.

They also performed at "Kyran Bracken's Ice Party" over the BIC's (Bournemouth International Centre) 25th Anniversary.
