= Joan Dewhirst =

British figure skater (1935–2020)

Joan Slater (nee Dewhirst)
Personal information
- Died: 2020 Bramhall, England

Figure skating career
- Country: Great Britain
- Partner: John Slater
Medal record
Representing Great Britain
Figure skating: Ice dancing
World Championships
Silver medal – second place	1952 Paris	Ice dance
Silver medal – second place	1953 Davos	Ice dance

Joan Dewhirst (1935 – 14 April 2020) was a British figure skater who competed in ice dance.

== Skating career ==
Dewhirst was born in Manchester, England. She began skating at age 11, and progressed quickly through the testing levels in figures, ice dance, and pairs. At the age of 14, Joan formed a dance partnership with John Slater and within a year were the silver medalists in the 1951 International Ice Dance Competition in Milan (forerunner to the World Ice Dance Championships). Joan and Jack trained in Manchester with Jack Wake, and also London by Gladys Hogg (famed British figure skating coach of the 1940s-1980s). Shortly after the Milan championship, Joan and John won the first of their three British Ice Dance Championships.

With partner John Slater, she won silver medals at the first two World Championships in ice dance: in 1952 and 1953.

After retiring from competition in 1954 they spent several years touring with the Ice Capades and won the World Professional Championship 6 times.

== Coaching ==
Joan transitioned to coaching in the early 1960s in Liverpool, Manchester, and Birmingham before spending decades as an elite coach in Altrincham.

Joan coached many British dance champions including Susan Getty & Roy Bradshaw, Karen Barber & Nicky Slater, Sharon Jones & Paul Askham, Sinead Kerr & John Kerr, and Lloyd Jones.

== Recognition ==
Joan was awarded a MBE Order of the British Empire in 2007, as well as a Lifetime Achievement Award from the British Figure Skating Association in 2016.

== Personal life and death ==
Joan and John Slater retired from competition in 1954 and married in July of that year. Their first of two sons Olympic figure skater Nicky Slater was born in 1958. Second son Kim was born on the way to the hospital while on the M62 motorway. Joan's husband John died in 1989.

Joan died on 14 April 2020 and is survived by her sons Nicky and Kim.

== Competitive highlights ==
With John Slater

Event	1952	1953
World Championships	2nd	2nd
