= The Sign of Diolyx =

2002 audio drama

Big Finish Productions audio drama
- Series: The Tomorrow People
- Release no.: 4
- Featuring: John, Elena, Paul, TIM
- Written by: Mike Tucker and Robert Perry
- Directed by: Jason Haigh-Ellery
- Produced by: Gary Russell; Jason Haigh-Ellery
- Executive producer: Stephen Cole
- Production code: ?
- Length: 80 mins + 30 mins of extras
- Release date: May 2002
- Preceded by: The Ghosts of Mendez
- Followed by: A New Atlantis

The Sign of Diolyx is a Big Finish Productions audio drama based on the British science fiction television series The Tomorrow People.

== Synopsis ==
Homo Superior - the next stage of human evolution. Young people with super powers, dedicated to safeguarding planet Earth. From their secret laboratory deep beneath the streets of London, aided by their super-computer TIM, they watch and wait for others like themselves - and guard against threats to all mankind. They are the Tomorrow People.

A new TP is breaking out, but something is horribly wrong. John and Paul travel to the Welsh village of Llan-Gwyliadwriaeth, but find that a psi dampening field is hampering their investigation and that young Alison Hardy has no intention of embracing her dormant powers.

Meanwhile, TIM discovers an energy signature connecting the village with a mysterious ship in hyperspace. Against Tim's better judgement, Elena goes to investigate and finds herself trapped with a ravenous alien entity.

What is the connection between the local vicar and the coven in Alison's dreams? What links an ancient stone circle and the ship in hyperspace? Who or what is Diolyx?

The Tomorrow People find that they have stumbled upon an ancient evil. An evil that is about to be unleashed upon the world.

== Plot ==
Part 1: Warning Shadows

Part 2: Into the Dark

Part 3: Electric Dreams

== Cast ==
- John - Nicholas Young
- Elena - Helen Goldwyn
- Paul - Daniel Wilson
- TIM - Philip Gilbert
- Mr. Hardy - Gareth Thomas
- Alison - Clare Buckfield
- Rev. Jane Green - Louise Faulkner
- Diolyx - Toby Longworth
