= Daniel Whiston =

English ice dancer

Dan Whiston
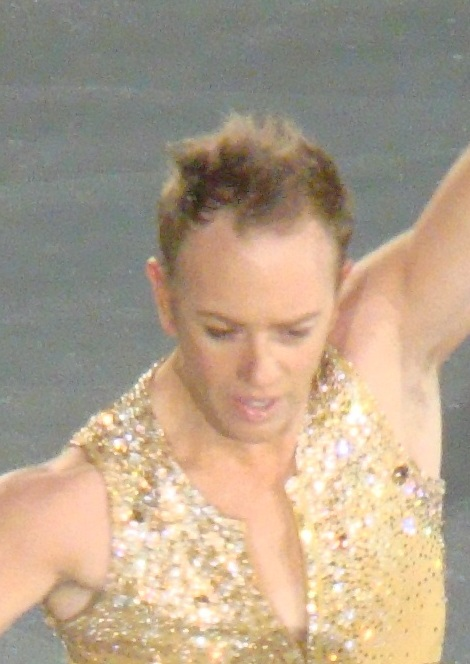

Personal information
- Born: 21 November 1976 (age 49) Blackpool, England

Figure skating career
- Country: England

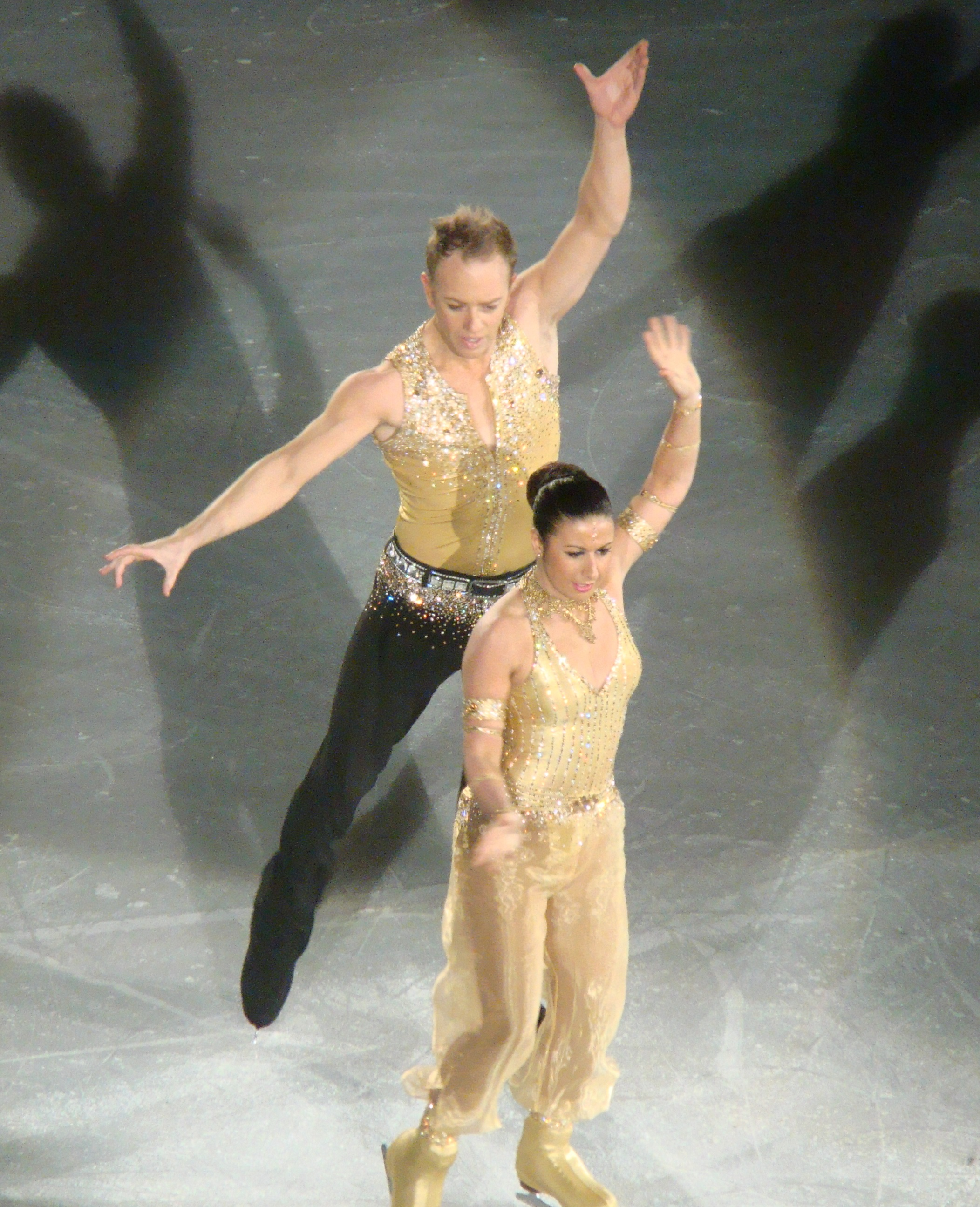
Whiston and Hayley Tamaddon on the Dancing on Ice tour in 2010 during their Jai Ho! (You Are My destiny) routine.

Daniel J Whiston (born 21 November 1976) is an English figure skater. He appeared in Strictly Ice Dancing on BBC One in 2004 and for all series of ITV show Dancing on Ice since its inception in 2006. He won the first series of Dancing on Ice while partnering actress Gaynor Faye, the fifth series with former Emmerdale actress Hayley Tamaddon and the eighth series with Olympic artistic gymnast, Beth Tweddle. Since 2019, Whiston has been Associate Creative Director of Dancing on Ice responsible for creating all professional routines and training all celebrity contestants.

In 2020, Whiston was Director of Choreography for ITV's The Real Full Monty on Ice.

== Background ==
Whiston was born on 21 November 1976 in Blackpool and is the son of Marj and William Whiston, he still lives in Blackpool. He started ice skating at the age of seven at the Blackpool Pleasure Beach's Ice Arena. He worked in the Arena and took part in his first show there when he was 18 years old. He also appeared in a tour of Grease on Ice in North America, and appeared in the Hot Ice Show at the Arena until 2006. He appears in the DVDs of the Hot Ice shows Quixotic, Xylatomia, H2O, Amarin and Chill.

== Career ==
Whiston appeared in the one-off Strictly Ice Dancing broadcast on BBC One on 26 December 2004.

Whiston performed at the 2010 Royal Variety Show, performing a combination of roller-blading and acrobatic. In 2020, Whiston was Director of Choreography for ITV's The Real Full Monty on Ice.

=== Dancing on Ice ===
Whiston has appeared in all series of Dancing on Ice since ITV started broadcasting it in January 2006, he is the first and only professional skater to win the show three times. He is famous for his cheeky wink at the start of each performance. On 21 May 2013, ITV confirmed that Dancing on Ice would end in 2014 after its ninth series meaning that with three wins as a professional Whiston will become the most successful professional partner in the show's history. Whiston returned to Dancing on Ice for its tenth series in January 2018 as a professional and again in 2019, 2020, 2021, and 2022 as Associate Creative Director.

Series (Year)	Celebrity Partner	Place
1 (2006)	Gaynor Faye	1st
2 (2007)	Emily Symons	4th
3 (2008)	Linda Lusardi	6th
4 (2009)	Roxanne Pallett	6th
5 (2010)	Hayley Tamaddon	1st
6 (2011)	Kerry Katona	8th
7 (2012)	Jennifer Ellison	4th
8 (2013)	Beth Tweddle	1st
9 (2014)	Hayley Tamaddon	2nd
10 (2018)	Cheryl Baker	9th

Whiston won the first series of Dancing on Ice on 3 March 2006 with partner, actress Gaynor Faye, He was also a presenter at the British Soap Awards on 24 May 2006.

In the second series in 2007 Whiston reached the semi-finals, finishing fourth, with actress Emily Symons, before being eliminated in a skate-off against singer Duncan James and his partner, Maria Filippov. With Symons also appearing in the soap opera, Emmerdale set in and filmed in West Yorkshire, they initially trained at Bradford Ice Arena in Bradford each week before travelling down to London for dress rehearsals.

In the third series in 2008, Whiston was partnered with another Emmerdale actress, Linda Lusardi and again they initially trained in Bradford. Following Lusardi's departure from the soap, and subsequent return to her family home in the south of England, it was revealed that Whiston had temporarily moved in with her family, to enable them to practise without the need for excessive travelling. Initial training was problematic as Lusardi broke her foot. They were voted out in week seven, finishing sixth, in a skate-off with actress Zaraah Abrahams and her partner Fred Palascak. Both Whiston and Lusardi appeared in the Dancing on Ice Tour 2008.

In the fourth series in 2009, Whiston was partnered with Roxanne Pallett, another former Emmerdale actress. In week 8 they were in the skate off against Zoe Salmon and Matt Evers and were eliminated 5-0.

Whiston won the fifth series of Dancing on Ice on 28 March 2010 with yet another former Emmerdale actress and childhood friend Hayley Tamaddon.

In the sixth series in 2011, Whiston was partnered with former Reality TV Star Kerry Katona. They were eliminated in week 5, in a skate off against Jeff Brazier & partner Isabelle Gauthier.

In the seventh series in 2012 Whiston's Partner was Brookside actress Jennifer Ellison. They were eliminated in the semi-final against Jorgie Porter and her partner Matt Evers.

Whiston won the eighth series of Dancing on Ice on 10 March 2013 and became a three-time champion with Olympic gymnast Beth Tweddle.

Whiston returned for his ninth series of Dancing on Ice for its "All-Star" series in 2014 with Hayley Tamaddon whom he won the show with in 2010. They made it to the final on 9 March 2014 and finished as runners-up.

When Dancing On Ice returned in 2018 for its 10th series, Whiston competed with singer Cheryl Baker from Bucks Fizz. They were eliminated in week 5, in a skate off against Donna Air and her partner Mark Hanretty.

=== Shows ===
In October 2016 Whiston starred in Intimissimi on Ice with international opera great Andrea Bocelli in Verona, Italy.

Preceded by None	Dancing on Ice Champion (with partner Gaynor Faye); Series 1 (2006)	Succeeded by Kyran Bracken and Melanie Lambert
Preceded by Ray Quinn and Maria Filippov	Dancing on Ice Champion (with partner Hayley Tamaddon); Series 5 (2010)	Succeeded by Sam Attwater and Brianne Delcourt
Preceded by Matthew Wolfenden (actor) and Nina Ulanova	Dancing on Ice Champion (with partner Beth Tweddle); Series 8 (2013)	Succeeded by Ray Quinn and Maria Filippov
