= John Slater (figure skater) =

Joan Dewhirst
Figure skating career
- Country: Great Britain
Medal record
Representing Great Britain
Figure skating: Ice dancing
World Championships
Silver medal – second place	1952 Paris	Ice dance
Silver medal – second place	1953 Davos	Ice dance

John Slater (1928–1989) was a British figure skater who competed in ice dance.

About 1950, John formed a dance partnership with 14-year old Joan Dewhirst. Within a year were the silver medalists in the 1951 International Ice Dance Competition in Milan (forerunner to the World Ice Dance Championships). John and Joan trained in Manchester with Jack Wake, and also London by Gladys Hogg (famed British figure skating coach of the 1940s-1980s). Shortly after the Milan championship, John and Joan won the first of their three British Ice Dance Championships.

John and Joan won silver medals at the first two World Championships in ice dance: in 1952 and 1953.

1954 saw John and Joan retiring from competition and marrying in July of that year. The spent several years touring with Ice Capades and won the World Professional Championship 6 times. Their first of two sons Olympic figure skater Nicky Slater was born in 1958. Second son Kim was born on the way to the hospital while on the M62 highway.

John died in 1989.

== Competitive highlights ==
With Joan Dewhirst

Event	1952	1953
World Championships	2nd	2nd
