= Dancing on Ice =

British ice skating competition series (2006–2014, 2018–2025)

- Created by: ITV Studios
- Presented by: Phillip Schofield; Holly Willoughby; Christine Lampard; Stephen Mulhern
- Judges: Robin Cousins; Karen Barber; Jason Gardiner; Nicky Slater; Karen Kresge; Ruthie Henshall; Natalia Bestemianova; Emma Bunton; Katarina Witt; Louie Spence; Ashley Roberts; Jayne Torvill; Christopher Dean; Ashley Banjo; John Barrowman; Oti Mabuse
- Voices of: Tony Gubba; Simon Reed; Matt Chapman; Sam Matterface; Alex Crook
- Theme music composer: Paul Farrer
- Country of origin: United Kingdom
- Original language: English
- No. of series: 17
- No. of episodes: 258

Production
- Executive producers: Jane Beacon; Katie Rawcliffe
- Production locations: Elstree Studios (2006–2010, 2012–2014); Shepperton Studios (2011); ITV Studios Bovingdon (2018–2025)
- Running time: 60–135 minutes
- Production companies: ITV Productions (2006–2009); ITV Studios Entertainment (2010–2014, 2018–2021); Lifted Entertainment (2022–2025)

Original release
- Network: ITV
- Release: 14 January 2006 – 9 March 2014
- Release: 7 January 2018 – 9 March 2025

Dancing on Ice is a British television series broadcast from 2006 to 2014 and then from 2018 to 2025. It was presented by Holly Willoughby and Stephen Mulhern. Other previous hosts include Phillip Schofield and Christine Lampard. The series features celebrities and their professional partners figure skating in front of a panel of judges. The series, broadcast on ITV, started on 14 January 2006 and initially ended on 9 March 2014.

On 4 September 2017, it was announced that a revived series would air on ITV from 7 January 2018 with Schofield and Willoughby returning as hosts. Jayne Torvill and Christopher Dean assumed new roles as head judges, alongside original judge Jason Gardiner and new judge Ashley Banjo. In 2020, John Barrowman replaced Gardiner as a judge, however on 3 October 2021, it was announced that Barrowman would not be returning to the judging panel. His replacement was later announced as Strictly Come Dancing professional Oti Mabuse. During the finale of the fifteenth series, it was confirmed that the show would return in 2024 for its sixteenth series. Following Schofield's resignation from ITV in 2023, Stephen Mulhern began co-hosting the series alongside Willoughby. In March 2024 it was announced that Dancing on Ice would return in 2025 for its seventeenth and final series which concluded on 9 March 2025.

On 26 March 2025, ITV announced that the series would be "rested" in 2026, and that there are currently no plans for another series.

== Background and history ==
The series was announced in November 2004 and originally titled Stars on Thin Ice, the show was renamed following the failure of ITV's celebrity oriented 2005 summer schedule. Dancing on Ice is frequently compared to the BBC's Strictly Come Dancing. In 2004, the BBC aired a Strictly special entitled Strictly Ice Dancing at Christmas, which was won by England goalkeeper David Seaman, who later became a contestant on the first series of Dancing on Ice.

ITV's show was given a January premiere amidst network doubts about its viability but became a surprise hit in Britain, where it became the third highest rated television show of 2006. It attained an impressive 13 million viewers for the final in March. Britain's best-known ice-skating duo and Olympic champions Jayne Torvill and Christopher Dean help to train the aspiring dancers, and also appear throughout the show with comments and advice. Head Coach Karen Barber also trains the skaters for the live show. From the beginning, Torvill and Dean opened every episode with a performance, with the exception of the second, third and fourth shows of the fourth series, when Torvill performed alone due to Dean's recovery from a shoulder operation. From 2012, they performed less frequently.

Schofield previously presented with Holly Willoughby, with commentary originally from Tony Gubba (later Simon Reed for the final three weeks in series 8 and then for the whole of series 9 following Gubba's death) and voiceovers done by John Sachs (previously Marc Silk in series 1 and Bob Lawrence in series 2 and 3). The members of The Ice Panel were originally Karen Barber, Jason Gardiner, Nicky Slater and Robin Cousins, and the fifth judge varied from series to series: Karen Kresge in the first series, Natalia Bestemianova in the second, Ruthie Henshall in the third and fourth and Emma Bunton in the fifth. In series 6, there were only three judges: Gardiner, Cousins and Bunton.

During the shows first two series, it ran two supplementary programmes – Dancing on Ice Defrosted, which aired on ITV2 directly after the main ITV1 show, and presented by Stephen Mulhern, whilst Dancing on Ice Exclusive (or Dancing on Ice Extra during series 1) was aired on ITV1 in a weekday teatime slot, and presented by Andi Peters alongside Andrea McLean in series 1 and Ben Shephard in series 2. In mid-2007, it was announced that both shows would not return to accompany the third series as the audience attracted was out of ITV2's target range. As part of ITV's new revamped schedule at the start of 2008, from the third series, the show aired on a Sunday night and featured updated music and new titles as well as redesigned graphics. The series 3 finale was a massive draw, pulling an average 11.7 million viewers (up from 9.6 million the previous year) peaking at 12.6 million viewers over the two-hour slot, up over a million from series 2.

The seventh series began on 8 January 2012, with Torvill and Dean as coaches for which they will be paid £250,000 each series. Christine Lampard was announced as the new co-presenter of the show replacing Holly Willoughby, whilst Katarina Witt and Louie Spence replaced Emma Bunton and Jason Gardiner on the judging panel. On 20 November 2012, it was announced that Gardiner was to return to the panel for the 2013 series, replacing Spence. The full judging panel for the 2013 series was revealed on 28 December 2012, with former The Pussycat Dolls singer Ashley Roberts joining and Karen Barber returning to the panel after acting as head coach on the show the previous two years; they joined Gardiner and head judge Robin Cousins on the panel.

=== Cancellation and revival ===
On 21 May 2013, Torvill and Dean announced that they would leave the series after its ninth series in 2014, leading to speculation that the whole show would be axed. On 24 June 2013 it was rumoured that Dancing on Ice may continue after they have left with new coaches, however, on 22 October 2013 it was confirmed that the show would end after its ninth series in 2014.

On 4 September 2017, ITV confirmed that the show would return in 2018. Torvill and Dean will return to the show as head judges along with Schofield and Willoughby as presenters. On 19 October 2017, Ashley Banjo was confirmed as a judge. Later that month, Gardiner confirmed that he would return to the judging panel. Ashley's brother, Jordan Banjo, acts as the show's backstage digital host. ITV Racing's betting presenter Matt Chapman was announced as the new commentator on 16 December 2017. However, following the first live show on 7 January, Chapman claimed that he had "quit" the show but it was later confirmed to be a decision by the ITV producers, responding to pressure from the TV audience. ITV and Talksport football commentator Sam Matterface was later confirmed as Chapman's replacement. On 21 August 2019, Gardiner confirmed that he would not return for the 12th series in 2020. At the start of September, series one contestant John Barrowman was confirmed as his replacement. On 3 October 2021, ITV announced that Barrowman would not be returning to the judging panel in 2022. In December, it was confirmed that Strictly Come Dancing professional Oti Mabuse would replace him for the fourteenth series.

In May 2023, Schofield resigned from ITV after admitting to having had a relationship with a young male ITV employee, ultimately confirming his departure from both This Morning and Dancing on Ice. Stephen Mulhern, who previously stood in for Schofield as presenter during the fourteenth series, was announced as his replacement and co-hosted alongside Willoughby until the show's cancellation in March 2025. Matterface did not return as commentator for the 2025 series and was replaced by Alex Crook, who deputised for him in previous series due to his footballing commitments.

== Format ==
Each week the celebrities and their partners perform a live ice dance routine. The four/five (as of Series 8) judges (commonly known as the Ice Panel) rate each performance and give a mark between 0.0 and 10.0 (0.0 to 6.0 between series 1 and 5), depending on the performance. These total scores then create a leaderboard which combines with the public vote in order to determine the two lowest placed couples. As this is the case, the pair with the lowest score from the judges can avoid being in the bottom two if the public vote for them.

Once the scores and votes are combined to form the final leaderboard for that week's show, the two/three couples at the bottom compete in a final showdown known as the "Skate Off", where they perform a different routine known as the Save-Me Skate. Unlike the main routines, this routine can be reused if the celebrity is in the Skate Off more than once. Once the couples have performed their routines for the judging panel, the judges decide on who deserves to stay and cast their votes, based on their second performance. The couple with the most votes from the judges receives a place in the following week's show, while the couple with the fewest votes leaves the competition. One couple leaves the competition each week, but in series 7, two couples left in one week, due to numbering issues. This also occurred in series 10, 11 and 14 respectively.

A live reunion special was staged one week after the end of each season, with all celebrities talking about their experiences during the season, and answering questions from a live studio audience. Torvill and Dean themselves then made a special in-studio appearance towards the end, thanking the contestants, hosts and judges, and the viewers for their votes.

=== Required elements ===
From Series 1 to 8, there was an element that the skaters were required to perform as part of their routines. From Series 9, the required skating elements format was removed due to the All-Star nature of the series. It was brought back in Series 10, and known as the Judges' Challenge. The required elements included:

- Assisted and unassisted jumps
- Use of a prop
- Forming a spiral position
- Flying above the ice, suspended by a harness
- A one footed spin
- Shadow steps
- Classic moves of Torvill and Dean, sometimes with a choice between them
- Cross rolls
- Toe step sequences
- Pair spin
- One unique move
- Solo skate
- Change of edge

=== Studio set and ice rink ===
The show was based in the George Lucas Stage at Elstree Studios from 2006 to 2010. In 2011 the show was broadcast from Shepperton Studios. In 2012 it returned to Elstree with a new, more modern set. There were several areas of the Elstree studio. The Tunnel was to the left of the rink and was where the couples entered the rink. The Ice Cave was situated at the back of the rink and was where Phillip Schofield and Torvill and Dean stood to interview the couples. The Judges and Contestants Area was to the right of the rink and was where the judging panel were based, and where Holly Willoughby or Christine Bleakley stood to speak to them and the couples.

For the 2018 revival series the show was relocated to a purpose-built studio at RAF Bovingdon.

== Series overview ==
Seventeen series have been broadcast to date, as summarised below.

Series	Start	Finish	Episodes	Winners	Runners-up	Third place
1	14 January 2006	4 March 2006	16	Gaynor Faye & Daniel Whiston	Stefan Booth & Kristina Lenko	Bonnie Langford & Matt Evers
2	20 January 2007	17 March 2007	18	Kyran Bracken & Melanie Lambert	Clare Buckfield & Andrei Lipanov	Duncan James & Maria Filippov
3	13 January 2008	16 March 2008	20	Suzanne Shaw & Matt Evers	Chris Fountain & Frankie Poultney	Zaraah Abrahams & Fred Palascak
4	11 January 2009	22 March 2009	22	Ray Quinn & Maria Filippov	Donal MacIntyre & Florentine Houdinière	Jessica Taylor & Pavel Aubrecht
5	10 January 2010	28 March 2010	23	Hayley Tamaddon & Daniel Whiston	Gary Lucy & Maria Filippov	Kieron Richardson & Brianne Delcourt
6	9 January 2011	27 March 2011	23	Sam Attwater & Brianne Delcourt	Laura Hamilton & Colin Ratushniak	Chloe Madeley & Michael Zenezini
7	8 January 2012	25 March 2012	23	Matthew Wolfenden & Nina Ulanova	Jorgie Porter & Matt Evers	Chico & Jodeyne Higgins
8	6 January 2013	10 March 2013	19	Beth Tweddle & Daniel Whiston	Matt Lapinskas & Brianne Delcourt	Luke Campbell & Jenna Smith
9	5 January 2014	9 March 2014	19	Ray Quinn & Maria Filippov	Hayley Tamaddon & Daniel Whiston	Beth Tweddle & Łukasz Różycki
10	7 January 2018	11 March 2018	10	Jake Quickenden & Vanessa Bauer	Brooke Vincent & Matej Silecky	Max Evans & Ale Izquierdo
11	6 January 2019	10 March 2019	10	James Jordan & Alexandra Schauman	Wes Nelson & Vanessa Bauer	Saara Aalto & Hamish Gaman
12	5 January 2020	8 March 2020	10	Joe Swash & Alex Murphy	Perri Kiely & Vanessa Bauer	Libby Clegg & Mark Hanretty
13	17 January 2021	14 March 2021	8	Sonny Jay & Angela Egan	Faye Brookes & Matt Evers	Colin Jackson & Klabera Komini
14	16 January 2022	27 March 2022	10	Regan Gascoigne & Karina Manta	Brendan Cole & Vanessa Bauer	Kimberly Wyatt & Mark Hanretty
15	15 January 2023	12 March 2023	9	Nile Wilson & Olivia Smart	Joey Essex & Vanessa Bauer	The Vivienne & Colin Grafton
16	14 January 2024	10 March 2024	9	Ryan Thomas & Amani Fancy	Miles Nazaire & Vanessa Bauer	Adele Roberts & Mark Hanretty
17	12 January 2025	9 March 2025	9	Sam Aston & Molly Lanaghan	Michaela Strachan & Mark Hanretty	Anton Ferdinand & Annette Dytrt

== Cast ==
Colour key

Host
Guest host
Backstage/digital host
Companion show host
Judge
Guest judge
Coach/Mentor
Contestant

Cast member	Series																
Cast member	1	2	3	4	5	6	7	8	9	10	11	12	13	14	15	16	17
Hosts
Phillip Schofield																	
Holly Willoughby																	
Coleen Nolan																	
Christine Lampard																	
Jordan Banjo																	
Kem Cetinay																	
Stephen Mulhern																	
Andi Peters																	
Andrea McLean																	
Ben Shephard																	
Judges
Karen Barber																	
Robin Cousins																	
Jason Gardiner																	
Nicky Slater																	
Karen Kresge																	
Natalia Bestemianova																	
Ruthie Henshall																	
Emma Bunton																	
Louie Spence																	
Katarina Witt																	
Ashley Roberts																	
Ashley Banjo																	
Christopher Dean																	
Jayne Torvill																	
John Barrowman																	
Oti Mabuse																	
Guest Judges
Michael Ball																	
Angela Rippon																	
Arlene Phillips																	
Johnny Weir																	

== Series results ==
=== Series 1 (2006) ===
The first series aired from 14 January to 4 March 2006 on ITV. It was presented by Phillip Schofield and Holly Willoughby, and judged by the "Ice Panel", consisting of Nicky Slater, Karen Kresge, Jason Gardiner, Karen Barber and Robin Cousins. Jayne Torvill and Christopher Dean coached and trained the contestants.

Celebrity	Notability	Professional partner	Status
Tamara Beckwith	Socialite	Sergey Malyshev	Eliminated 1st
Andi Peters	Television presenter	Tamara Sharp	Eliminated 2nd
Andrea McLean	GMTV weather presenter	Doug Webster	Eliminated 3rd
John Barrowman	Actor & singer	Olga Sharutenko	Eliminated 4th
Sean Wilson	Coronation Street actor	Marika Humphreys	Eliminated 5th
Kelly Holmes	Olympic middle-distance runner	Todd Sand	Eliminated 6th
David Seaman	England goalkeeper	Pam O'Connor	Eliminated 7th
Bonnie Langford	Actress & West End dancer	Matt Evers	Third place
Stefan Booth	Actor	Kristina Lenko	Runners-up
Gaynor Faye	Coronation Street actress	Daniel Whiston	Winners

=== Series 2 (2007) ===
The second series aired from 20 January to 17 March 2007 on ITV. It was presented by Phillip Schofield and Holly Willoughby, and judged by the "Ice Panel", consisting of Nicky Slater, Natalia Bestemianova, Jason Gardiner, Karen Barber, and Robin Cousins. Jayne Torvill and Christopher Dean coached and trained the contestants.

Celebrity	Notability	Professional partner	Status
Neil Fox	Radio presenter & talent show judge	Pamela O'Connor	Eliminated 1st
Phil Gayle	Newsreader & freelance journalist	Natalia Pestova	Eliminated 2nd
Ulrika Jonsson	Television presenter	Pavel Aubrecht	Eliminated 3rd
Stephen Gately	Boyzone singer	Kristina Lenko	Eliminated 4th
Kay Burley	Sky newscaster	Fred Palascak	Eliminated 5th
Lisa Scott-Lee	Steps singer	Matt Evers	Eliminated 6th
Lee Sharpe	England footballer	Frankie Poultney	Eliminated 7th
Emily Symons	Home and Away & Emmerdale actress	Daniel Whiston	Eliminated 8th
Duncan James	Blue singer	Maria Filippov	Third place
Clare Buckfield	Actress	Andrei Lipanov	Runners-up
Kyran Bracken	England rugby player	Melanie Lambert	Winners

=== Series 3 (2008) ===
The third series aired from 13 January to 16 March 2008 on ITV. The show moved from Saturday nights to Sunday nights, with Phillip Schofield and Holly Willoughby returning as hosts. Karen Barber, Nicky Slater, Jason Gardiner, and Robin Cousins returned to the "Ice Panel", with Ruthie Henshall joining as a replacement for Natalia Bestemianova.

Celebrity	Notability	Professional partner	Status
Sarah Greene	Television presenter	Fred Palascak	Eliminated 1st
Natalie Pinkham	Sports television presenter	Andrei Lipanov	Eliminated 2nd
Michael Underwood	Television presenter	Melanie Lambert	Withdrew
Samantha Mumba	Singer-songwriter	Pavel Aubrecht	Eliminated 3rd
Aggie MacKenzie	How Clean Is Your House? co-presenter	Sergey Malyshev	Eliminated 4th
Tim Vincent	Television presenter	Victoria Borzenkova	Eliminated 5th
Steve Backley	Olympic javelin thrower	Susie Lipanova	Eliminated 6th
Linda Lusardi	Model & Emmerdale actress	Daniel Whiston	Eliminated 7th
Greg Rusedski	Professional tennis player	Kristina Lenko	Eliminated 8th
Gareth Gates	Singer-songwriter	Maria Filippov	Eliminated 9th
Zaraah Abrahams	Coronation Street actress	Fred Palascak	Third place
Chris Fountain	Hollyoaks actor	Frankie Poultney	Runners-up
Suzanne Shaw	Hear'Say singer	Matt Evers	Winners

=== Series 4 (2009) ===
The fourth series aired from 11 January to 22 March 2009 on ITV. Phillip Schofield and Holly Willoughby returned as main presenters, while Karen Barber, Nicky Slater, Jason Gardiner, Ruthie Henshall, and Robin Cousins returned to the "Ice Panel".

Celebrity	Notability	Professional partner	Status
Graeme Le Saux	England & Chelsea footballer	Kristina Lenko	Eliminated 1st
Gemma Bissix	EastEnders & Hollyoaks actress	Andrei Lipanov	Eliminated 2nd
Jeremy Edwards	Holby City actor	Darya Nucci	Eliminated 3rd
Michael Underwood	Television presenter	Melanie Lambert	Eliminated 4th
Todd Carty	Stage & screen actor	Susie Lipanova	Eliminated 5th
Ellery Hanley	England rugby player	Frankie Poultney	Eliminated 6th
Melinda Messenger	Glamour model & television presenter	Fred Palascak	Eliminated 7th
Roxanne Pallett	Emmerdale actress	Daniel Whiston	Eliminated 8th
Zoe Salmon	Blue Peter presenter	Matt Evers	Eliminated 9th
Coleen Nolan	Singer & Loose Women panellist	Stuart Widdall	Eliminated 10th
Jessica Taylor	Liberty X singer	Pavel Aubrecht	Third place
Donal MacIntyre	Investigative journalist	Florentine Houdinière	Runners-up
Ray Quinn	Actor & The X Factor runner-up	Maria Filippov	Winners

=== Series 5 (2010) ===
The fifth series aired from 10 January to 28 March 2010, on ITV, with a preview show on 8 January 2010. Phillip Schofield and Holly Willoughby returned as the main presenters, while Karen Barber, Robin Cousins, Jason Gardiner, and Nicky Slater returned to the "Ice Panel". Emma Bunton joined the panel as a replacement for Ruthie Henshall. Barber acted as head judge for weeks 6 and 7 due to Cousins commentating on the 2010 Winter Olympics in Vancouver, with Michael Ball and Angela Rippon appearing as guest judges those weeks.

Celebrity	Notability	Professional partner	Status
Sinitta	Pop singer & aide to Simon Cowell	Andrei Lipanov	Eliminated 1st
Bobby Davro	Comedian & impressionist	Molly Moenkhoff	Eliminated 2nd
Jeremy Sheffield	Holby City actor	Susie Lipanova	Eliminated 3rd
Tana Ramsay	Cookbook author & television presenter	Stuart Widdall	Eliminated 4th
Heather Mills	Model & businesswoman	Matt Evers	Eliminated 5th
Hilary Jones	General practitioner & television presenter	Alexandra Schauman	Eliminated 6th
Sharron Davies	Olympic medley swimmer	Pavel Aubrecht	Eliminated 7th
Emily Atack	The Inbetweeners actress	Fred Palascak	Eliminated 8th
Mikey Graham	Boyzone singer	Melanie Lambert	Eliminated 9th
Danny Young	Coronation Street actor	Frankie Poultney	Eliminated 10th
Danniella Westbrook	EastEnders actress	Matthew Gonzalez	Eliminated 11th
Kieron Richardson	Hollyoaks actor	Brianne Delcourt	Third place
Gary Lucy	The Bill actor	Maria Filippov	Runners-up
Hayley Tamaddon	Emmerdale actress	Daniel Whiston	Winners

=== Series 6 (2011) ===
The sixth series aired from 9 January to 27 March 2011, on ITV. Phillip Schofield and Holly Willoughby returned as hosts, while Jayne Torvill and Christopher Dean returned as mentors. As part of a major revamp, the show moved from Elstree Studios to Shepperton Studios, where they unveiled a new set. Karen Barber, Emma Bunton, Robin Cousins, and Jason Gardiner returned, though Barber moved from the "Ice Panel" to head coach. Nicky Slater did not return as a judge and was not replaced. In another change, the judges gave scores out of 10.0 instead of 6.0, allowing for an overall total score of 30.0.

The line-up was revealed on 18 December 2010, and consisted of sixteen celebrities. The first two shows, on 9 and 16 January 2011, were billed as "qualifying" rounds, with eight couples skating in each, and two being eliminated each week. The remaining twelve couples progressed to the main competition, which started on 23 January.

Celebrity	Notability	Professional partner	Status
Angela Rippon	Television journalist & newsreader	Sean Rice	Did not qualify
Nadia Sawalha	EastEnders actress & television presenter	Mark Hanretty	Did not qualify
Craig McLachlan	Neighbours & Home and Away actor	Maria Filippov	Did not qualify
Elen Rivas	Model	Łukasz Różycki	Did not qualify
Steven Arnold	Coronation Street actor	Nina Ulanova	Eliminated 1st
Dominic Cork	International cricketer	Alexandra Schauman	Eliminated 2nd
Jennifer Metcalfe	Hollyoaks actress	Sylvain Longchambon	Eliminated 3rd
Comedy Dave	BBC Radio 1 presenter	Frankie Poultney	Eliminated 4th
Kerry Katona	Media personality & Atomic Kitten singer	Daniel Whiston	Eliminated 5th
Vanilla Ice	Rapper	Katie Stainsby	Eliminated 6th
Denise Welch	Actress & Loose Women panellist	Matt Evers	Eliminated 7th
Jeff Brazier	Television presenter	Isabelle Gauthier	Eliminated 8th
Johnson Beharry	British Army regiment soldier	Jodeyne Higgins	Eliminated 9th
Chloe Madeley	Freelance journalist & model	Michael Zenezini	Third place
Laura Hamilton	Children's television presenter	Colin Ratushniak	Runners-up
Sam Attwater	EastEnders actor	Brianne Delcourt	Winners

=== Series 7 (2012) ===
The seventh series aired from on 8 January to 25 March 2012, on ITV. Phillip Schofield returned as presenter, but Holly Willoughby was replaced by Christine Bleakley. Jayne Torvill and Christopher Dean returned to mentor the celebrities, with Karen Barber returning as head coach. This series was judged by Robin Cousins, Louie Spence, and Katarina Witt. The show moved back to its original location of Elstree Studios, which had been used during the show's first five series.

Celebrity	Notability	Professional partner	Status
Andy Akinwolere	Blue Peter presenter	Maria Filippov	Eliminated 1st
Laila Morse	EastEnders actress	Łukasz Różycki	Eliminated 2nd
Mark Rhodes	Children's television presenter	Frankie Poultney	Eliminated 3rd
Corey Feldman	Hollywood actor	Brooke Castile	Eliminated 4th
Charlene Tilton	Dallas actress	Matthew Gonzalez	Eliminated 5th
Rosemary Conley	Businesswoman, author & broadcaster	Mark Hanretty	Eliminated 6th
Heidi Range	Sugababes singer	Andrei Lipanov	Eliminated 7th
Sébastien Foucan	Freerunner	Brianne Delcourt	Eliminated 8th
Sam Nixon	Children's television presenter	Alexandra Schauman	Eliminated 9th
Andy Whyment	Coronation Street actor	Vicky Ogden	Eliminated 10th
Chemmy Alcott	World Cup alpine ski racer	Sean Rice	Eliminated 11th
Jennifer Ellison	Actress	Daniel Whiston	Eliminated 12th
Chico	The X Factor contestant	Jodeyne Higgins	Third place
Jorgie Porter	Hollyoaks actress	Matt Evers	Runners-up
Matthew Wolfenden	Emmerdale actor	Nina Ulanova	Winners

=== Series 8 (2013) ===
The eighth series aired from on 6 January to 10 March 2013, on ITV. Phillip Schofield and Christine Bleakley returned as hosts, with Jayne Torvill and Christopher Dean serving as mentors. The series was judged by Robin Cousins, Karen Barber, Ashley Roberts, and Jason Gardiner. Gardiner had departed after series 6 in 2011, but returned to replace Louie Spence, while Ashley Roberts joined the Ice Panel as Katarina Witt's replacement. Barber rejoined the Ice Panel after serving as head coach in series 6 and series 7.

Celebrity	Notability	Professional partner	Status
Pamela Anderson	Actress & Playboy model	Matt Evers	Eliminated 1st
Lauren Goodger	The Only Way Is Essex cast member	Michael Zenezini	Eliminated 2nd
Oona King	Labour Party politician	Mark Hanretty	Eliminated 3rd
Anthea Turner	Television presenter	Andy Buchanan	Eliminated 4th
Shayne Ward	Singer & The X Factor winner	Maria Filippov	Eliminated 5th
Joe Pasquale	Comedian	Vicky Ogden	Eliminated 6th
Keith Chegwin	Television presenter & actor	Olga Sharutenko	Eliminated 7th
Samia Ghadie	Coronation Street actress	Sylvain Longchambon	Eliminated 8th
Gareth Thomas	Wales rugby player	Robin Johnstone	Withdrew
Luke Campbell	Olympic boxer	Jenna Smith	Third place
Matt Lapinskas	EastEnders actor	Brianne Delcourt	Runners-up
Beth Tweddle	Olympic artistic gymnast	Daniel Whiston	Winners

=== Series 9: All-Stars (2014) ===
The ninth series aired from 5 January to 9 March 2014 on ITV. It was announced on 22 October 2013 that this series would be the show's last, and would be an 'All-Star' series featuring former winners and previous contestants. Phillip Schofield and Christine Bleakley returned to present, with Jayne Torvill and Christopher Dean returning as mentors. Robin Cousins, Jason Gardiner, Karen Barber, and Ashley Roberts returned to the "Ice Panel". Cousins was unable to appear on the ice panel during weeks 6 and 7 due to him commentating the 2014 Winter Olympics in Sochi, Russia, and was replaced by original judge Nicky Slater, while Barber acted as head judge.

Celebrity	Previous series	Professional partner	Status
Jorgie Porter	Series 7	Sylvain Longchambon	Eliminated 1st
Joe Pasquale	Series 8	Robin Johnstone	Eliminated 2nd
David Seaman	Series 1	Frankie Poultney	Eliminated 3rd
Gary Lucy	Series 5	Katie Stainsby	Eliminated 4th
Todd Carty	Series 4	Alexandra Schauman	Eliminated 5th
Zaraah Abrahams	Series 3	Andy Buchanan	Eliminated 6th
Bonnie Langford	Series 1	Andrei Lipanov	Eliminated 7th
Gareth Gates	Series 3	Brianne Delcourt	Eliminated 8th
Suzanne Shaw	Series 3	Matt Evers	Eliminated 9th
Kyran Bracken	Series 2	Nina Ulanova	Eliminated 10th
Sam Attwater	Series 6	Vicky Ogden	Eliminated 11th
Beth Tweddle	Series 8	Łukasz Różycki	Third place
Hayley Tamaddon	Series 5	Daniel Whiston	Runners-up
Ray Quinn	Series 4	Maria Filippov	Winners

=== Series 10 (2018) ===
The tenth series debuted on ITV on 7 January 2018. It was the first series since the show had ended in 2014 and featured a new set and ice rink, a new panel of judges, and a new logo. After the tenth series, the live tour of Dancing on Ice returned from March to April 2018, featuring celebrities from the series.

For this series, the show relocated from its previous home at Elstree Studios to a new, purpose-built studio at RAF Bovingdon in Hertfordshire. Creative directors and mentors Christopher Dean and Jayne Torvill became head judges and alternated the role on a weekly basis, joined on the panel by newcomer Ashley Banjo and Jason Gardiner, who returned for his ninth series as judge. Phillip Schofield and Holly Willoughby served as hosts, with Willoughby replacing Christine Lampard.

Celebrity	Notability	Professional partner	Status
Candice Brown	The Great British Bake Off winner	Matt Evers	Eliminated 1st
Stephanie Waring	Hollyoaks actress	Sylvain Longchambon	Eliminated 2nd
Perri Shakes-Drayton	Olympic hurdler	Hamish Gaman	Eliminated 3rd
Cheryl Baker	Bucks Fizz singer & television presenter	Daniel Whiston	Eliminated 4th
Lemar	Singer-songwriter & producer	Melody Le Moal	Eliminated 5th
Antony Cotton	Coronation Street actor	Brandee Malto	Eliminated 6th & 7th
Donna Air	Actress & television presenter	Mark Hanretty	Eliminated 6th & 7th
Alex Beresford	ITV Weather forecaster	Brianne Delcourt	Eliminated 8th
Kem Cetinay	Love Island winner	Alex Murphy	Eliminated 9th
Max Evans	Rugby union player	Ale Izquierdo	Third place
Brooke Vincent	Coronation Street actress	Matej Silecky	Runners-up
Jake Quickenden	Singer & The X Factor contestant	Vanessa Bauer	Winners

=== Series 11 (2019) ===
The eleventh series debuted on 6 January 2019 on ITV. Phillip Schofield and Holly Willoughby once again returned as hosts; Ashley Banjo, Christopher Dean, Jason Gardiner, and Jayne Torvill all returned as judges. Former judge Karen Barber returned as head coach, a role that she had last held in 2012.

Celebrity	Notability	Professional partner	Status
Mark Little	Neighbours actor	Brianne Delcourt	Eliminated 1st
Richard Blackwood	EastEnders actor	Carlotta Edwards	Eliminated 2nd
Didi Conn	Grease actress	Łukasz Różycki	Eliminated 3rd
Saira Khan	Television presenter	Mark Hanretty	Eliminated 4th
Gemma Collins	The Only Way Is Essex cast member	Matt Evers	Eliminated 5th
Ryan Sidebottom	England cricketer	Brandee Malto	Eliminated 6th & 7th
Jane Danson	Coronation Street actress	Sylvain Longchambon	Eliminated 6th & 7th
Melody Thornton	The Pussycat Dolls singer	Alexander Demetriou	Eliminated 8th
Brian McFadden	Westlife singer	Alex Murphy	Eliminated 9th
Saara Aalto	Singer-songwriter	Hamish Gaman	Third place
Wes Nelson	Love Island finalist	Vanessa Bauer	Runners-up
James Jordan	Strictly Come Dancing professional	Alexandra Schauman	Winners

=== Series 12 (2020) ===
The twelfth series debuted on ITV on 5 January 2020. Phillip Schofield and Holly Willoughby returned as hosts. On 1 September 2019, it was announced that Jason Gardiner would not return as a judge and that series 1 participant John Barrowman would replace him.

Celebrity	Notability	Professional partner	Status
Trisha Goddard	Television presenter	Łukasz Różycki	Eliminated 1st
Lucrezia Millarini	ITV News presenter & journalist	Brendyn Hatfield	Eliminated 2nd
Radzi Chinyanganya	Blue Peter presenter	Jess Hatfield	Eliminated 3rd
Caprice	Model & actress	Hamish Gaman; Oscar Peter (Week 4)	Withdrew
Kevin Kilbane	Republic of Ireland footballer	Brianne Delcourt	Eliminated 4th
Ian "H" Watkins	Steps singer	Matt Evers	Eliminated 5th
Maura Higgins	Love Island finalist	Alexander Demetriou	Eliminated 6th
Lisa George	Coronation Street actress	Tom Naylor	Eliminated 7th
Ben Hanlin	Magician & television presenter	Carlotta Edwards	Eliminated 8th
Libby Clegg	Paralympic sprinter	Mark Hanretty	Third place
Perri Kiely	Diversity dancer	Vanessa Bauer	Runners-up
Joe Swash	EastEnders actor & television presenter	Alexandra Schauman; Alex Murphy (Weeks 4–10)	Winners

=== Series 13 (2021) ===
The thirteenth series debuted on ITV on 17 January 2021. Phillip Schofield and Holly Willoughby returned as hosts, while Ashley Banjo, John Barrowman, Christopher Dean, and Jayne Torvill returned as judges.

Celebrity	Notability	Professional partner	Status
Myleene Klass	Hear'Say singer & presenter	Łukasz Różycki	Eliminated 1st
Denise van Outen	Actress, singer & presenter	Matt Evers	Withdrew
Graham Bell	Olympic skier & broadcaster	Karina Manta	Eliminated 2nd
Rufus Hound	Comedian, actor & presenter	Robin Johnstone	Withdrew
Billie Shepherd	The Only Way Is Essex cast member	Mark Hanretty	Withdrew
Matt Richardson	Comedian & television presenter	Vicky Ogden	Eliminated 3rd
Joe-Warren Plant	Emmerdale actor	Vanessa Bauer	Withdrew
Amy Tinkler	Olympic artistic gymnast	Joe Johnson	Eliminated 4th
Jason Donovan	Actor & singer	Alexandra Schauman	Withdrew
Rebekah Vardy	Television personality & model	Andy Buchanan	Eliminated 5th
Lady Leshurr	Rapper	Brendyn Hatfield	Eliminated 6th
Colin Jackson	Olympic hurdler	Klabera Komini	Third place
Faye Brookes	Coronation Street actress	Hamish Gaman; Matt Evers (Weeks 6–8)	Runners-up
Sonny Jay	Capital FM presenter	Angela Egan	Winners

=== Series 14 (2022) ===
The fourteenth series debuted on ITV on 16 January 2022. Phillip Schofield and Holly Willoughby returned as hosts. Ashley Banjo, Christopher Dean, and Jayne Torvill returned as judges for their fifth series, while it was announced that John Barrowman would not be returning to the judging panel. In December, Strictly Come Dancing professional Oti Mabuse was confirmed as Barrowman's replacement. Arlene Phillips also joined the panel on 20 February as a guest judge.

Celebrity	Notability	Professional partner	Status
Ben Foden	England rugby player	Robin Johnstone	Eliminated 1st
Ria Hebden	Television presenter	Łukasz Różycki	Eliminated 2nd
Rachel Stevens	S Club 7 singer	Brendyn Hatfield	Eliminated 3rd
Liberty Poole	Love Island contestant	Joe Johnson	Eliminated 4th
Bez	Happy Mondays musician & dancer	Angela Egan	Eliminated 5th
Sally Dynevor	Coronation Street actress	Matt Evers	Eliminated 6th
Stef Reid	Paralympic athlete	Andy Buchanan	Eliminated 7th
Kye Whyte	Olympic cyclist	Tippy Packard	Eliminated 8th & 9th
Connor Ball	The Vamps bassist	Alexandra Schauman	Eliminated 8th & 9th
Kimberly Wyatt	The Pussycat Dolls singer	Mark Hanretty	Third place
Brendan Cole	Strictly Come Dancing professional	Vanessa Bauer	Runners-up
Regan Gascoigne	Professional dancer	Karina Manta	Winners

=== Series 15 (2023) ===
The fifteenth series debuted on ITV on 15 January 2023. Phillip Schofield and Holly Willoughby returned as hosts. Ashley Banjo, Christopher Dean, Oti Mabuse, and Jayne Torvill also returned as judges.

Celebrity	Notability	Professional partner	Status
John Fashanu	England footballer & television presenter	Alexandra Schauman	Eliminated 1st
Michelle Heaton	Liberty X singer	Łukasz Różycki	Eliminated 2nd
Ekin-Su Cülcüloğlu	Love Island winner & actress	Brendyn Hatfield	Eliminated 3rd
Patsy Palmer	EastEnders actress & DJ	Matt Evers	Eliminated 4th
Darren Harriott	Stand-up comedian & presenter	Tippy Packard	Eliminated 5th
Carley Stenson	Hollyoaks actress & singer	Mark Hanretty	Eliminated 6th
Mollie Gallagher	Coronation Street actress	Sylvain Longchambon	Eliminated 7th
Siva Kaneswaran	The Wanted singer	Klabera Komini	Eliminated 8th
The Vivienne	Drag queen & RuPaul's Drag Race UK winner	Colin Grafton	Third place
Joey Essex	The Only Way Is Essex cast member	Vanessa Bauer	Runners-up
Nile Wilson	Olympic artistic gymnast	Olivia Smart	Winners

=== Series 16 (2024) ===
The sixteenth series began airing on ITV from 14 January 2024. In May 2023, Phillip Schofield who had presented the show since its inception, resigned from ITV after admitting to having had a relationship with an ITV employee. Stephen Mulhern, who previously stood in for Schofield as presenter during the fourteenth series, was announced to be co-hosting the series alongside Holly Willoughby in December 2023.

Celebrity	Notability	Professional partner	Status
Ricky Hatton	Professional boxer	Robin Johnstone	Eliminated 1st
Hannah Spearritt	S Club 7 singer & actress	Andy Buchanan	Eliminated 2nd
Claire Sweeney	Actress, singer & television presenter	Colin Grafton	Eliminated 3rd
Roxy Shahidi	Emmerdale actress	Sylvain Longchambon	Eliminated 4th
Lou Sanders	Stand-up comedian & writer	Brendyn Hatfield	Eliminated 5th
Ricky Norwood	EastEnders actor	Annette Dytrt	Eliminated 6th
Eddie the Eagle	Olympic ski jumper	Vicky Ogden	Eliminated 7th
Amber Davies	Love Island winner & West End performer	Simon Proulx-Sénécal	Eliminated 8th
Greg Rutherford	Olympic long jumper & presenter	Vanessa James	Withdrew
Adele Roberts	BBC Radio 1 presenter	Mark Hanretty	Third place
Miles Nazaire	Made in Chelsea cast member	Vanessa Bauer	Runners-up
Ryan Thomas	Coronation Street actor	Amani Fancy	Winners

=== Series 17 (2025) ===
The seventeenth and final series began airing on ITV from 12 January 2025 with returning hosts Holly Willoughby and Stephen Mulhern. On 6 December 2024, it was announced that Sarah Storey would no longer be able to continue in the competition due to injury.

Celebrity	Notability	Professional partner	Status
Chelsee Healey	Hollyoaks actress	Andy Buchanan	Eliminated 1st
Josh Jones	Stand-up comedian	Tippy Packard	Withdrew
Ferne McCann	The Only Way is Essex star	Brendyn Hatfield	Eliminated 2nd
Steve Redgrave	Retired rower	Vicky Ogden	Eliminated 3rd
Chris Taylor	Reality star	Vanessa Bauer (Weeks 1–3); Robin Johnstone (Weeks 4–5)	Eliminated 4th
Charlie Brooks	EastEnders actress	Eric Radford	Eliminated 5th
Mollie Pearce	The Traitors star	Colin Grafton	Eliminated 6th
Dan Edgar	TOWIE star	Vanessa James	Eliminated 7th
Anton Ferdinand	Footballer	Annette Dytrt	Third place
Michaela Strachan	TV presenter	Mark Hanretty	Runners-up
Sam Aston	Coronation Street actor	Molly Lanaghan	Winners

== Series averages ==
All information in this table comes from BARB.

Series	Eps.	Series premiere		Series finale	
Series	Eps.	Date	Viewers (in millions)	Date	Viewers (in millions)
1	16	14 January 2006	9.83	4 March 2006	11.68
2	18	20 January 2007	9.08	17 March 2007	9.14
3	20	13 January 2008	9.34	16 March 2008	12.08
4	22	11 January 2009	8.83	22 March 2009	11.31
5	23	10 January 2010	9.64	28 March 2010	9.42
6	23	9 January 2011	10.23	27 March 2011	9.35
7	23	8 January 2012	9.62	25 March 2012	7.90
8	19	6 January 2013	8.32	10 March 2013	7.36
9	19	5 January 2014	7.19	9 March 2014	6.95
10	10	7 January 2018	8.56	11 March 2018	6.05
11	10	6 January 2019	7.51	10 March 2019	6.37
12	10	5 January 2020	5.87	8 March 2020	6.15
13	8	17 January 2021	6.01	14 March 2021	4.22
14	10	16 January 2022	5.03	27 March 2022	3.93
15	9	15 January 2023	4.62	12 March 2023	3.81
16	9	14 January 2024	4.23	10 March 2024	3.32
17	9	12 January 2025	3.31	9 March 2025	3.06

== Awards and nominations ==
Year	Organisation	Category	Recipient(s)	Result	Ref.
2006	Royal Television Society Craft & Design Awards	Costume Design - Entertainment & Non Drama Productions	Stephen Adnitt	Nominated	
2006	Royal Television Society Craft & Design Awards	Lighting, Photography and Camera - Lighting for Multicamera	Tom Kinane, Svend Pedersen	Won	
2006	Royal Television Society Craft & Design Awards	Lighting, Photography and Camera - Multicamera Work	Paul Kirrage	Won	
2006	National Television Awards	Most Popular Entertainment Programme	Dancing on Ice	Nominated	
2007	National Television Awards	Most Popular Talent Show	Dancing on Ice	Nominated	
2007	Royal Television Society Craft & Design Awards	Costume Design - Entertainment & Non Drama Productions	Stephen Adnitt	Won	
2007	Royal Television Society Craft & Design Awards	Lighting for Multicamera	Dave Davey	Won	
2007	Royal Television Society Craft & Design Awards	Multicamera Work	Paul Kirrage	Won	
2008	National Television Awards	Most Popular Talent Show	Dancing on Ice	Nominated	
2008	TV Quick Awards	Best Talent Show	Dancing on Ice	Nominated	
2008	Royal Television Society Craft & Design Awards	Lighting, Photography & Camera - Lighting for Multicamera	Dave Davey	Nominated	
2008	Royal Television Society Craft & Design Awards	Multicamera Work	Paul Kirrage	Nominated	
2008	Royal Television Society Craft & Design Awards	Production Design - Entertainment & Non Drama Productions	Markus Blee	Nominated	
2009	TV Quick Awards	Best Talent Show	Dancing on Ice	Nominated	
2009	Royal Television Society Craft & Design Awards	Lighting, Photography & Camera - Multicamera Work	Paul Kirrage	Nominated	
2009	Royal Television Society Craft & Design Awards	Make Up Design - Entertainment & Non Drama	Rena Metcalfe, Paul Haskell	Won	
2010	Royal Television Society Craft & Design Awards	Costume Design - Entertainment & Non Drama	Stephen Adnitt	Nominated	
2010	Royal Television Society Craft & Design Awards	Lighting and Multi Camera - Lighting for Multi Camera	Dave Davey	Won	
2010	Royal Television Society Craft & Design Awards	Lighting and Multi Camera - Multi Camera Work	Paul Kirrage	Nominated	
2011	National Television Awards	Most Popular Talent Show	Dancing on Ice	Nominated	
2011	Royal Television Society Craft & Design Awards	Costume Design – Entertainment & Non Drama Productions	Stephen Adnitt	Nominated	
2012	National Television Awards	Most Popular Talent Show	Dancing on Ice	Nominated	
2012	Royal Television Society Craft & Design Awards	Lighting for Multicamera	Dave Davey	Nominated	
2012	Royal Television Society Craft & Design Awards	Multicamera Work	Richard Valentine	Nominated	
2013	National Television Awards	Most Popular Talent Show	Dancing on Ice	Nominated	
2013	Royal Television Society Craft & Design Awards	Costume Design - Entertainment & Non Drama	Stephen Adnitt	Nominated	
2013	Royal Television Society Craft & Design Awards	Lighting for Multicamera	Dave Davey	Won	
2013	Royal Television Society Craft & Design Awards	Multicamera Work	Richard Valentine	Won	
2013	Royal Television Society Craft & Design Awards	Tape & Film Editing - Entertainment & Situation Comedy	Editing Team	Nominated	
2014	National Television Awards	Most Popular Talent Show	Dancing on Ice	Nominated	
2014	TRIC Awards	TRIC Special Award	Dancing on Ice	Won	
2014	Royal Television Society Craft & Design Awards	Lighting for Multicamera	Dave Davey	Nominated	
2019	National Television Awards	Most Popular Talent Show	Dancing on Ice	Nominated	
2020	National Television Awards	Most Popular Talent Show	Dancing on Ice	Nominated	
2020	Royal Television Society Craft & Design Awards	Make Up Design - Entertainment & Non Drama	Marcus Gurgel	Nominated	

== Spin-offs ==
Like many other reality TV shows, Dancing on Ice has had a number of supplementary shows. The first was Dancing on Ice Defrosted. It was presented by Stephen Mulhern and aired on ITV2 immediately after the main ITV show and again after the results show. The show featured opinions from celebrity guests and past contestants as well as from Torvill and Dean, the judges, presenters and competitors. Judge Nicky Slater also offered in-depth analysis of various performances using the latest video technology that the judges use to judge performances.

The second spin-off show was originally called Dancing on Ice Extra and was presented by Andi Peters and Andrea McLean, both competitors in the first series. Midway through the first series Paul O'Grady left ITV to join Channel 4 meaning that ITV had no show to put on air at 5 pm. The format of Dancing on Ice Defrosted was modified so that it could be broadcast every weekday. Due to Andrea's maternity leave during the second series she did not return to present the show and therefore Ben Shephard joined the show as the anchor presenter, and, unlike during the previous, series Andi Peters was now a roving reporter around the studio. For its second run the show was renamed Dancing on Ice Exclusive. Neither of these first two spin-off shows returned in 2008 nor 2009.

In 2010 it was announced that a new spin-off show would accompany Dancing on Ice, named Dancing on Ice Friday, presented by Ben Shephard and Coleen Nolan.

=== Champion of Champions (2007) ===
This took place on Saturday 24 March 2007 and featured finalists from both Series 1 and Series 2. All six celebrities did one routine each, scored by the judges, and then voted on by the public. The two couples finishing first after the public voted skated again in the skate off to decide the winner. The skaters that did not reach the skate off – 3rd to 6th – were announced "in no particular order", so ranks may not be accurate.

Place	Celebrity	Partner	Score
1st	Kyran Bracken	Melanie Lambert	6.0 + 6.0 + 5.5 + 6.0 + 6.0 = 29.5
2nd	Clare Buckfield	Andrei Lipanov	5.5 + 5.5 + 4.5 + 5.0 + 5.5 = 26.0
3rd	Bonnie Langford	Matt Evers	5.0 + 5.5 + 5.5 + 5.5 + 5.0 = 26.5
4th	Duncan James	Maria Filippov	4.5 + 5.5 + 5.5 + 5.5 + 5.0 = 26.0
5th	Gaynor Faye	Daniel Whiston	5.0 + 5.5 + 5.0 + 5.0 + 5.0 = 25.5
6th	Stefan Booth	Kristina Lenko	4.5 + 5.0 + 4.0 + 4.5 + 4.5 = 22.5

=== Dancing on Ice at Christmas (2008) ===
For Christmas 2008, Torvill and Dean went head to head with Jayne Torvill having a team of three female celebrities, and Christopher Dean having a team of three male celebrities. The judges were the usual line-up of Robin Cousins, Ruthie Henshall, Jason Gardiner, Karen Barber and Nicky Slater. Holly Willoughby and Phillip Schofield presented the 90-minute programme.

Place	Celebrity	Partner	Score
1st	Suzanne Shaw	Matt Evers	6.0 + 6.0 + 6.0 + 6.0 + 6.0 = 30.0
2nd	Chris Fountain	Frankie Poultney	6.0 + 6.0 + 5.0 + 5.5 + 5.5 = 28.0
3rd	Kyran Bracken	Melanie Lambert	5.5 + 5.5 + 5.0 + 5.5 + 5.5 = 27.0
4th	Clare Buckfield	Pavel Aubrecht	5.5 + 5.5 + 4.5 + 5.0 + 5.5 = 26.0
5th	Duncan James	Maria Filippov	5.0 + 5.0 + 5.0 + 5.0 + 4.5 = 24.5
6th	Zaraah Abrahams	Fred Palascak	5.0 + 4.5 + 4.5 + 5.0 + 5.0 = 24.0

Team Torvill scored 80 points to Team Dean's 79.5 and won the show by also receiving the majority of the audience votes.

Suzanne Shaw received the perfect score of 30 for the third time in a row. In her last two appearances on the show she has picked up the trophy.

=== Dancing on Ice: Make Me a Star (2008) ===
A 30-minute prime time spin-off to Dancing on Ice premiered on 26 January 2008 and ran for a few episodes, presented solely by Holly Willoughby. This both showed some exclusive footage of the celebrities training for the Sunday night main show and followed Torvill and Dean on the search for a member of the public to perform on the Dancing on Ice final in 2009.

Shows:

- Kyran Bracken skated with his new partner (they have been on Holiday on Ice)
- David Seaman and Melanie Lambert showed what to expect on the Tour
- Clare Buckfield and Andrei Lipanov did a new performance of "Reach"

=== Dancing on Ice: Ice Star (2009) ===
This was shown after the announcement of the bottom two had been made but before the skate off. It showed Torvill and Dean's search for an entertainment act on ice, with auditions from all kinds of ice skaters. The winner skated live on the Dancing on Ice 2009 final and join Torvill and Dean on tour.

From a shortlist of 20 acts, Torvill and Dean invited only four back to give another performance in the Dancing on Ice studio. The final four were:

- Hannah and Daniel – Child pairs skaters
- Nick Rigby – Figure skater
- The Oxford Freestylers – Stunt and trick performers
- The Elody – Skating girlband

The Oxford Freestylers won and performed live on the Dancing on Ice 2009 final.

=== Dancing on Ice Goes Gold (2012) ===
An Olympic special aired on 22 July 2012, before the London 2012 Summer Olympics. It featured medal-winning Olympic athletes.

The one-off special featured the judges from series 7, with Phillip Schofield and Christine Bleakley returning as presenters. Torvill & Dean unveiled a new and specially-crafted performance. Head judge, Robin Cousins also performed a solo routine for first time in twelve years.

Olympian	Sport	Medals	Professional partner	Judges scores	Status
Steve Williams OBE	Rowing	Gold, Coxless Four (Athens 2004, Beijing 2008)	Katie Stainsby	9.5 + 9.5 + 10.0 = 29.0	Gold (Winner)
Olga Korbut	Gymnastics	4 Gold & 2 Silver (Munich 1972, Montreal 1976)	Matthew Gonzalez	10.0 + 9.0 + 9.5 = 28.5	Silver (2nd place)
Pippa Wilson MBE	Sailing	Gold, Yngling sailing (Beijing 2008)	Mark Hanretty	9.0 + 9.5 + 9.5 = 28.0	Bronze (3rd place)
Gail Emms MBE	Badminton	Silver, Mixed Doubles (Athens 2004)	Łukasz Różycki	9.0 + 9.0 + 9.5 = 27.5	Eliminated
Colin Jackson CBE	Hurdling, Sprinting	Silver, 110m Hurdles (Seoul Olympics 1988)	Frankie Poultney	9.0 + 8.5 + 9.0 = 26.5	Eliminated
Jamie Baulch	Sprinting	Silver, 4 × 400 m relay (Atlanta 1996)	Maria Filippov	8.5 + 8.5 + 9.0 = 26.0	Eliminated
Tessa Sanderson CBE	Javelin	Gold (LA 1984)	Yannick Bonheur	7.5 + 7.5 + 8.0 = 23.0	Eliminated

The judges scores were added to the studio audiences votes to decide the winner. No public vote took place, as the programme was recorded earlier in the year.

=== Dancing on Ice Friday (2010) ===
A brand new spin-off show for the 2010 series of Dancing on Ice, appropriately called Dancing on Ice Friday, gave viewers the insight to the training of the celebrities over the last week. It was presented by Ben Shephard and former contestant and Loose Women panellist Coleen Nolan. The show was broadcast from 8 pm to 8.30 pm on Friday evenings on ITV throughout the duration of the main shows season. STV who broadcast the main show did not broadcast this on the Friday evening but after repeating the previous week's main show on the following Saturday afternoon. Due to poor ratings, Dancing on Ice Friday was axed prior to the 2011 series.

=== Dancing on Ice at Christmas (2019) ===
A Christmas special aired on 22 December 2019 featuring performances from all the couples of the series 12, previous winner Ray Quinn, series 11 contestant Gemma Collins, and Torvill and Dean. Jake Quickenden was also supposed to be performing, but on 13 November 2019, it was announced that he had to pull out due to a neck injury.

=== Dancing on Ice: The Greatest Show on Ice (2021) ===
Due to a number of early withdrawals and to give the remaining contestants sufficient time to recover from any injuries, series 13 was paused for one week and the episode scheduled to air on 21 February was replaced with a pre-recorded special celebrating the most memorable moments in the show's history.

== Merchandise ==
In November 2008, ITV Global Entertainment secured a publishing deal with Ghostlight to publish a game based on the series for the Nintendo DS and Wii.

== Dancing on Ice: The Tour ==
Torvill and Dean's Dancing on Ice: The Live Tour is a nationwide tour in the United Kingdom. It began in 2007 following the success of the television series Dancing on Ice.

During the second series of Dancing on Ice on ITV, it was announced that the show would be taken on a UK arena tour. The tour was presented by former contestant and Dancing on Ice Exclusive host Andi Peters and featured contestants from the UK and Australian series of the show competing against each other for audience votes (cast via SMS). Each contestant performed two solo routines for the judges: (Nicky Slater, Jason Gardiner, Karen Barber, Robin Cousins, and a guest judge who varied at each location). The two couples with the most votes then proceeded to the Bolero Dance-Off. Following the completion of the dance-off, the judges selected a winner decided by a majority vote. The live show also featured numerous performances from Jayne Torvill and Christopher Dean as well as the professional skaters from the television series and other special guests.
