= Phil Gayle =

English newsreader

- Born: 6 April 1964 (age 62); Birmingham, England
- Occupations: Newsreader; journalist; broadcaster
- Employers: Channel 4; BBC; ITV; Deutsche Welle
- Relatives: Mike Gayle (brother)

Phil Gayle (born 6 April 1964) is an English newsreader, broadcaster and journalist who has worked for networks including the BBC, ITV and Channel 4, broadcasting the news on both television and radio. As well as presenting on programmes including The Big Breakfast, Crimewatch Daily, London Today and London Tonight, Gayle has also competed on the second series of Dancing on Ice. Since 2015, he has been a presenter for DW News, an international English-language news channel which broadcasts from Germany. Gayle could also be heard as the voice of the in-flight announcements for easyJet.

== Life and career ==
=== Career beginnings and radio ===
Gayle was born on 6 April 1964 in Birmingham to parents from Jamaica and is the older brother of journalist and novelist Mike Gayle. Before working in television, he worked as a DJ on local radio stations. Between 1986 and 1988, he worked at BRMB Radio, Birmingham and presented overnight, late night and early morning shows. In 1988, he moved on to Signal Radio, Stoke, presenting a live weekday three-hour night time phone-in five nights a week. He also co-presented the Saturday afternoon sports programme which also included live interviews and music. During 1995, he moved to Rock FM, as a Preston Music DJ on the Sunday evening, post Network Chart show along with two weekend overnight shows and presented a live current affairs and lifestyle phone-in on BBC Radio Newcastle in 1995 and 1996, breaking several stories which were picked up by national press. The shows would often feature one-on-one interviews, panel discussions, on-the-road reports and live audience debates. Between 2010 and 2015, he hosted a radio show on BBC Radio Oxford.

=== Television ===
In 1997, Gayle joined Channel 4 where he was employed as a newsreader on The Big Breakfast. Gayle took over from Peter Smith and presented for three years before being succeeded by Jasmine Lowson, but returned to the show for its final broadcast in 2002. He would also go on to present other programmes for Channel 4 such as First Edition (1997–2002), a 30-minute current affairs programme aimed at school age children and was the second presenter on the Channel 4 News. In 1998, he co-presented an original broadcast pilot of Find A Fortune on ITV, surprising people with inheritances they did not know about, providing situation updates throughout the show and presenting recorded reports in the field.

Gayle presented several programmes on the BBC. Between 2000 and 2001, he co-presented Crimewatch Daily, a daily live morning show on crime which included live studio and telephone interviews on BBC One. In the same year, he also presented a segment on walking holidays in the Lake District on the BBC One programme Holiday on a Shoestring. In 2001, Gayle moved to rival broadcaster ITV and had a major role in the show That's Esther, where he was the on-the-road reporter for the half-hour consumer affairs and human-interest series. He would also act as the main reporter on anti-scalding campaign and interviews with people overcoming the odds during the show's run between 2001 and 2002. Gayle also appeared in numerous LWT news-based programmes. He was the newsreader and reporter on the regional London news programmes London Today and London Tonight between 2002 and 2005, and hosted the monthly current affairs documentary series The London Programme. He also fronted another LWT current affairs programme, The Week. In 2007, Gayle was a contestant on the second series of Dancing on Ice. He and his partner Natalia Pestova were second to be eliminated. Since May 2015, Gayle has been one of the presenters of DW News on Deutsche Welle in Germany. In 2021, as part of Channel 4's Black to Front campaign, Gayle returned to The Big Breakfast to read the news during a one-off special of the programme. He then made another return in August 2022.
