= Isabelle Gauthier =

Canadian figure skater (born 1980)

Personal information
- Born: 2 April 1980 (age 46)

Figure skating career
- Country: Canada
- Retired: 2000

Isabelle Gauthier (born 2 April 1980) is a Canadian former competitive ice skater, and as of 2011, one of the Dancing on Ice professional skaters.

== Personal life ==
She also plays cello and violin, and French was her favourite subject at school. She has a law degree from Université Laval.

== Skating career ==
=== Competitive ===
At the age of six, Gauthier began her skating career in Quebec City. She competed in pair skating. With Danny Provost, she represented Canada at the 1996 World Junior Championships. She later competed with Eric Therrien and Rick Derwantz.

Event	1995–1996	1996–1997	1997–1998	1998–1999	1999–2000
World Junior Championships	15th				
Canadian Championships			9th		
Canadian Junior Championships		7th			9th

_{1995–1996: With Danny Provost; 1996–1998: With Eric Therrien; 1999–2000: With Rick Derwantz}

=== Ice shows ===
Since 2002, Gauthier has toured with numerous skating productions, including Disney on Ice and Holiday on Ice. Her skating partners have included Jeff Langdon, Eric Therrien, Danny Provost, Vitali Lysenka, Rick Derwantz and Colin Ratushniak.

In 2011, Gauthier joined Dancing on Ice. Series six was her only series of the show, and she was partnered with television personality and presenter, Jeff Brazier. For the pro routines on the show, she skated with fellow Canadian, Colin Ratushniak.
