= Nicky Slater =

English figure skater

Personal information
- Full name: Nicholas Mark Slater
- Other names: Nicky Slater
- Born: 6 April 1958 (age 68) Liverpool, England
- Height: 1.70 m (5 ft 7 in)

Figure skating career
- Country: Great Britain
- Skating club: Richmond Ice Dance & Figure Skating Club
Medal record
Figure skating
Ice dancing
Representing Great Britain
European Championships
Bronze medal – third place	1983 Dortmund	Ice dancing
World Junior Championships
Gold medal – first place	1976 Megève	Ice dancing

Nicholas Mark Slater (born 6 April 1958) is an English former ice dancer and TV and theatrical performer.

== Personal life ==
Slater's parents, Joan Dewhirst Slater and John Slater, competed together in ice dancing, winning silver at the 1952 and 1953 World Championships. They were also World Professional champions. They retired to coach at Liverpool Rink then Manchester Ice Palace and finally Altrincham Ice Rink.

Slater attended Parr Lane County Primary School and North Cestrian Grammar School in Altrincham. He is married to Christiane and has a son, Benjamin Edward 'Tiger', born in February 2008.

== Career ==
=== Competitive career ===
With partner Kathryn Winter, he won the 1976 World Junior Championships. When that partnership ended, he teamed up with Karen Barber. They won the bronze medal at the 1983 European Championships. They represented Great Britain at the 1980 Winter Olympics, placing 12th, and at the 1984 Winter Olympics, where they placed 6th. They were British ice dance champions in 1985.

=== Post-competitive career ===
Slater has produced ice events, his first being Sport Aid at the NEC in 1986 in aid of the Band Aid Trust. He conceived and produced skate-along a national skating fundraiser for Cystic Fibrosis Trust launched on Blue Peter and ran ice gala tours in the UK to benefit cystic fibrosis research and as independent productions.

He was Marketing and Communications Director of The Shaftesbury Society for five years, during which time he gained a Masters in Marketing from Bristol Business School at The University of the West of England. After this, he endeavoured to develop ice rinks in the UK for five years.

He has produced ice spectaculars in the US as CEO and Creative Producer with his company Adventure On Ice working in partnership with Robin Cousins and Disson Furst and Partners. Together the partnership produced:

- Improv-Ice for USA Networks (3) *The Starskates Series (8) for NBC *Skaters Tribute to shows for ESPN (2)

In 2005, he produced and starred in The Finding a Wife Tour a UK theatre show. In 2008, he created and starred in Ice Times and toured UK theatres skating with Louise Owen and Charlotte Aitken.

Slater has also contributed to Sense-National Deafblind and Rubella Association's City Ice Skate events.

Since 2006, he has focused on developing himself as a singer-songwriter and music producer.

==== Television ====
Since his retirement from competitive skating, Slater has worked as an 'in vision' expert and commentator on ice skating for both ITV and Channel 4, and as a commentator on Star, HDTV and on British Eurosport where he has also anchored a number of shows. He has been the "surprise" on an episode of Surprise Surprise.

Slater appeared as a judge on the BBC One spin-off show Strictly Ice Dancing in 2004. This was a one-off episode which aired on Boxing Day. In 2006, he joined the ITV celebrity skating show Dancing on Ice as a judge, a role in which he continued for five years. In October 2010, it was announced that Slater would not return as a judge for the sixth series in 2011. During his time on Dancing on Ice, Slater also worked on Dancing on Ice: The Tour.

During the final series of Dancing on Ice in early 2014, judge Robin Cousins was absent for weeks six and seven of the show due to him commentating at the 2014 Winter Olympics in Sochi, Russia. Slater stepped in as judge on the show, whilst Karen Barber was acting as head judge. He had previously judged the World Professional Figure Skating Championship for ABC and Strictly Ice Dancing for the BBC.

==== Singer-songwriter, writer, entertainer ====
From his earliest days, Slater was involved in music through his parents' ice dancing background. From his earliest recollections, he was helping his father edit music on their Ferrograph 'Reel to Reel' tape machine for ice dance performances. Drawing on that upbringing (and over ten years of development and study across areas of songwriting, singing, instruments and music production), he composes and performs his own music.

==== End of commentary career ====
On 23 March 2022, Slater and Simon Reed were acting as the commentators of the international feed of the 2022 World Figure Skating Championships. After the event concluded, a hot mic recorded them referring to two-time World Champion and three-time Olympic medalist Meagan Duhamel as the "bitch from Canada", while laughing. The clip went viral, leading the Canadian Broadcasting Corporation (who were employing Duhamel to do Canadian commentary) to demand a response from the International Skating Union (ISU). The ISU released a statement on social media on 24 March 2022, in which they said they were "shocked by the language used" and that there "is no place for harassing and abusive language or remarks and behavior in sport and our society." Slater and Reed were suspended by the ISU and their service provider, neither will cover any future ISU figure skating event, and an internal investigation will follow. The ISU also apologised to Duhamel.

== Competitive highlights ==
=== With Barber ===
International
Event	78–79	79–80	80–81	81–82	82–83	83–84	84–85
Olympics		12th				6th	
Worlds	13th	10th	7th	7th	5th	5th	6th
Europeans	11th	8th	5th	5th	3rd	4th	4th
NHK Trophy			2nd	1st			1st
Skate America				3rd			
Skate Canada			2nd	2nd			
St. Ivel			3rd	2nd	2nd	1st	
National
British Champ.	2nd	2nd	2nd	2nd	2nd		1st

=== With Winter ===
International: Junior
Event	1975–76	1976–77
World Junior Championships	1st	
National
British Championships		3rd
