= Simon Reed =

TV commentator

- Born: 5 August 1947 (age 79); Sutton, London, England
- Education: King's College School
- Occupations: Broadcaster; commentator
- Relatives: Oliver Reed (half-brother); Sir Carol Reed (uncle); Sir Herbert Beerbohm Tree (grandfather)

Simon Reed (born 5 August 1947) is a British broadcaster, known as a commentator on a variety of sports. His voice has also been heard on Dancing on Ice. He is the half-brother of actor Oliver Reed, nephew of film director Sir Carol Reed and grandson of RADA founder Sir Herbert Beerbohm Tree.

Educated at King's College School, Reed captained Teddington Cricket Club from 1982 to 1986.

His career began in the 1970s at Thames Television, as a sports reporter, commentator and presenter. He covered a wide range of sports including ice dancing, providing the commentary on Torvill and Dean's European Championship winning performance of Bolero in 1984.

Simon began commentating on tennis in 1984 for Channel Four. He has been a commentator on Eurosport since 1991. He has been head of their commentary team since 1995. Since 2000, he has been part of the BBC's Wimbledon commentary team. In 2009, Reed discussed tennis being part of the Olympic games and said "The whole Olympic issue is a funny one. I don't think tennis needs the Olympics any more than the Olympics needs tennis, and though it's an easier fit than it used to be I have to say I still find its presence a little strange."

Reed was nominated for Sports commentator of the year at the Royal Television Society Television Sport Awards in 1999, but was runner-up to Peter Alliss.

An avid table tennis player and league competitor, Simon competes in the Guildford District Table Tennis League.

A familiar voice for Eurosport's English channel, he still commentates for Tennis and Figure Skating, as well as the BBC at Wimbledon, the Olympics and ATP Tennis' World Feed. For the BBC, he reported on the Rio 2016 Olympic Games and commentated on badminton, tennis and table tennis matches at the Paris 2024 Olympics.

He gained media attention after he was suspended from the International Skating Union, after comments about Meagan Duhamel.

At Oliver Reed's funeral in 1999, Simon (who used to run Oliver's PR) gave a tribute to his half brother saying "Oliver taught me a lot more than just about having a drink. He was innovative, very, very funny and very talented. He lived life as if it were a party."
