= Clare Buckfield =

English actress (born 1976)

- Born: 10 April 1976 (age 50); Paddington, London, England
- Occupation: Actress
- Years active: 1992–present
- Partner: Declan Donnelly (1993–2003)

Clare Buckfield (born 10 April 1976) is an English actress, best known for playing the role of Jenny Porter in the BBC sitcom 2point4 Children for most of the nineties and Natasha Stevens in the CBBC series Grange Hill.

== Biography ==
From an early age, both she and her identical twin sister Julie harboured ambitions to be actresses, leading their mother to hire her daughters an agent. As a result, Clare and Julie appeared in local productions and were offered modelling work.

A graduate of the Sylvia Young Theatre School in London, Buckfield originally auditioned for the part of Natalie Stevens in BBC 1 teenage soap Grange Hill. She lost out to her twin sister Julie who was auditioning for the part of Chrissy Mainwaring, but Clare eventually won the role of Natasha Stevens in 1992. She appeared in Grange Hill for two years. Clare and Julie competed again to replace Clare Woodgate as character Jenny Porter in 2point4children, but this time Clare got the part over Julie. Clare appeared in the series until 1999.

In 2003, Buckfield played the role of Sandy in Grease, opposite Noel Sullivan as Danny and Amanda-Jane Manning as Rizzo at The Jersey Opera House. In 2004, Buckfield landed the role of Katy Bell in Steel River Blues, a program intended to fill the void left by London's Burning on ITV1. The series was not recommissioned beyond its initial seven-episode run.

She has also appeared in episodes of Dangerfield, Doctors, and Holby City. She did the voice-over of Samantha in the PG Tips television commercials and appeared in the Big Finish Doctor Who audio of The One Doctor, alongside 6th Doctor Colin Baker, as Sally Ann-Stubbins in 2001. In 2006, she returned to Doctor Who, starring alongside Paul McGann and Stephen Gately in the radio adventure The Horror of Glam Rock and then again in 2007 (released in 2008) in Dead London. She most recently played Audrey in The Little Shop of Horrors (2009 UK Tour).

== Dancing on Ice ==
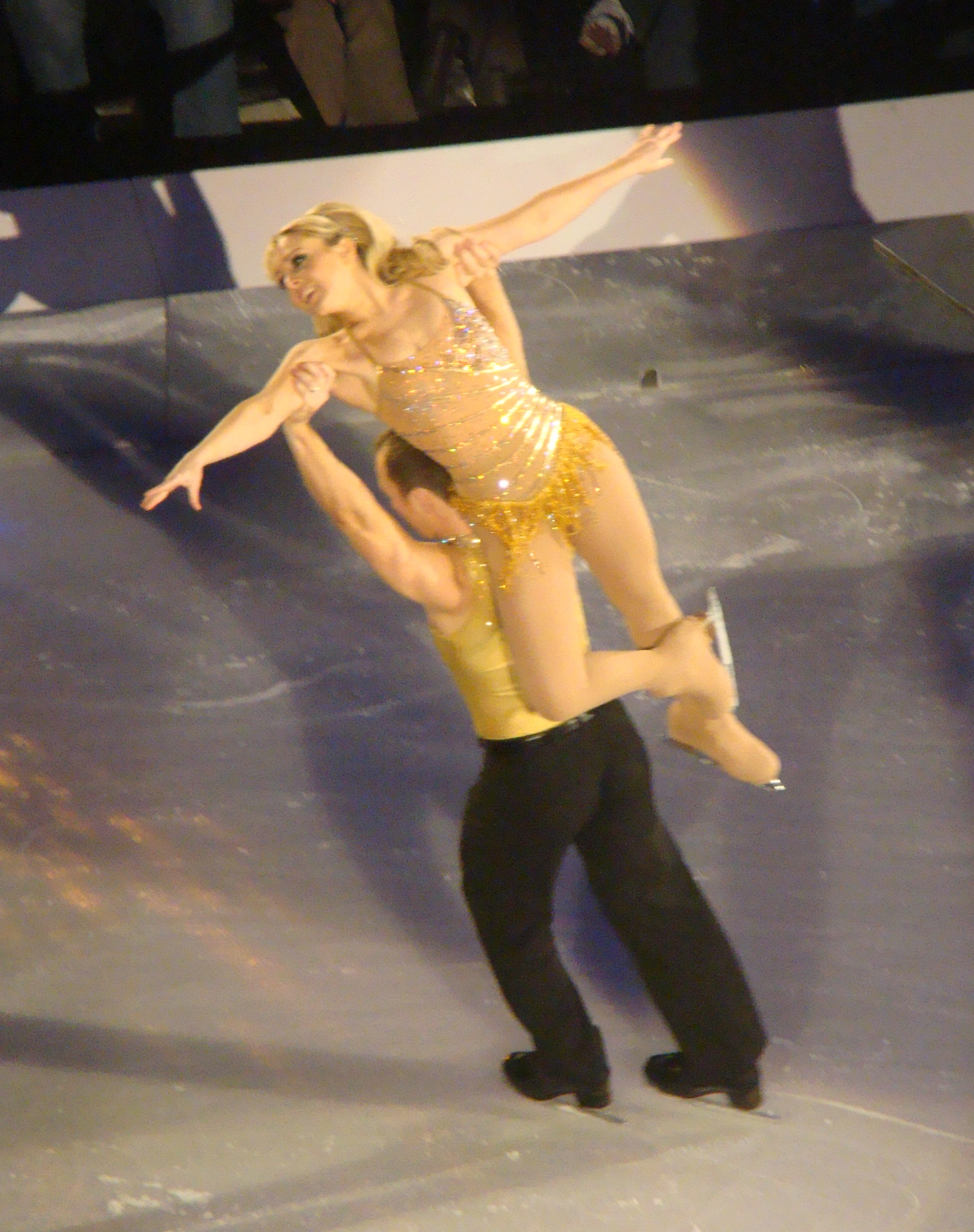
Clare Buckfield performing with Łukasz Różycki on the Dancing on Ice tour in 2010.

Buckfield gained second place in the second series of the hit ITV show Dancing on Ice. Her partner was the Russian skating star Andrei Lipanov. She was the last female celebrity contestant left in the competition and was in the final along with rugby ace Kyran Bracken and singer Duncan James. The final requirement was for the celebrities to fly over the ice using a harness, at which Buckfield excelled with the joint highest result of the series at 29.5. The final took place on Saturday, 17 March 2007 and Buckfield came second.

During the series, she experienced several injuries, the most serious being a pulled muscle underneath her ribcage. Buckfield was polled in the final twice during the series but was saved from eviction by the judges. She appeared in the Dancing On Ice Live Tour which saw past celebrities from the two series battle it out again on the ice. Buckfield has also taken part in the Sense City Ice Skate challenge in support of the Sense-National Deafblind and Rubella Association.

== Personal life ==
From 1993 until 2003, Buckfield was in a relationship with Declan Donnelly.
