= Karen Kresge =

British choreographer

Karen Kresge (born 1957) is an American choreographer. She has choreographed many West End productions as well as "Seattle Symphony on Ice" in 1991. In 2006, Kresge was a judge on the ITV show Dancing on Ice. For unknown reasons, she did not return for the second series in 2007 and was replaced by Natalia Bestemianova. She went on to appear as a choreographer on Holiday on Ice in 2007 and 2009 with former Dancing on Ice colleague Robin Cousins.
