= Karen Barber =

English ice dancer

Personal information
- Full name: Karen Barber
- Born: 21 June 1961 (age 65) Manchester, England
- Height: 1.65 m (5 ft 5 in)

Figure skating career
- Country: Great Britain
- Skating club: Richmond Ice Dance & Figure Skating Club
Medal record
Figure skating
Ice dancing
Representing Great Britain
European Championships
Bronze medal – third place	1983 Dortmund	Ice dancing
World Junior Championships
Silver medal – second place	1977 Megève	Ice Dancing

Karen Barber (born 21 June 1961 in Manchester) is a British ice dancer. She is the 1983 European bronze medalist and competed at two Olympics with partner Nicky Slater.

== Early life ==
She lived on Droylsden Road in Audenshaw.

== Skating career ==
Barber won the silver medal at the 1977 World Junior Championships with partner Kim Spreyer. When that partnership ended, she teamed up with Nicky Slater. They won the bronze medal at the 1983 European Championships. They represented Great Britain at the 1980 Winter Olympics, placing 12th, and at the 1984 Winter Olympics, where they placed 6th.

Following her retirement from competitive skating, Barber worked as a coach and skated professionally.

== Media work ==
From 2006 Barber served as a judge on Dancing On Ice, until 2011 where she was moved into the role of head coach where remained for the 2011 and 2012 series (it was in her 1st year as coach that she got into a big fight with her former co-judge Jason Gardiner) before she returned to the judging panel in 2013 where she remained until the end of series 9 in 2014. Barber did not return to the programme in 2018 but did return for series 11 as head coach in 2019.

== Personal life ==
Barber has two daughters, Laura and Emma, with her former husband, Stephen Pickavance.

She has been in a relationship with Christopher Dean since 2011.

== Competitive highlights ==
(with Slater)

Event	1978–79	1979–80	1980–81	1981–82	1982–83	1983–84	1984–85
Olympic Winter Games		12th				6th	
World Championships	13th	10th	7th	7th	5th	5th	6th
European Championships	11th	8th	5th	5th	3rd	4th	4th
NHK Trophy			2nd	1st			1st
Skate America				3rd			
Skate Canada International			2nd	2nd			
St. Ivel International			3rd	2nd	2nd	1st	
British Championships				2nd	2nd		1st

(with Spreyer)

Event	1977
World Junior Championships	2nd
