= Kyran Bracken =

English rugby union player

Kyran Bracken MBE
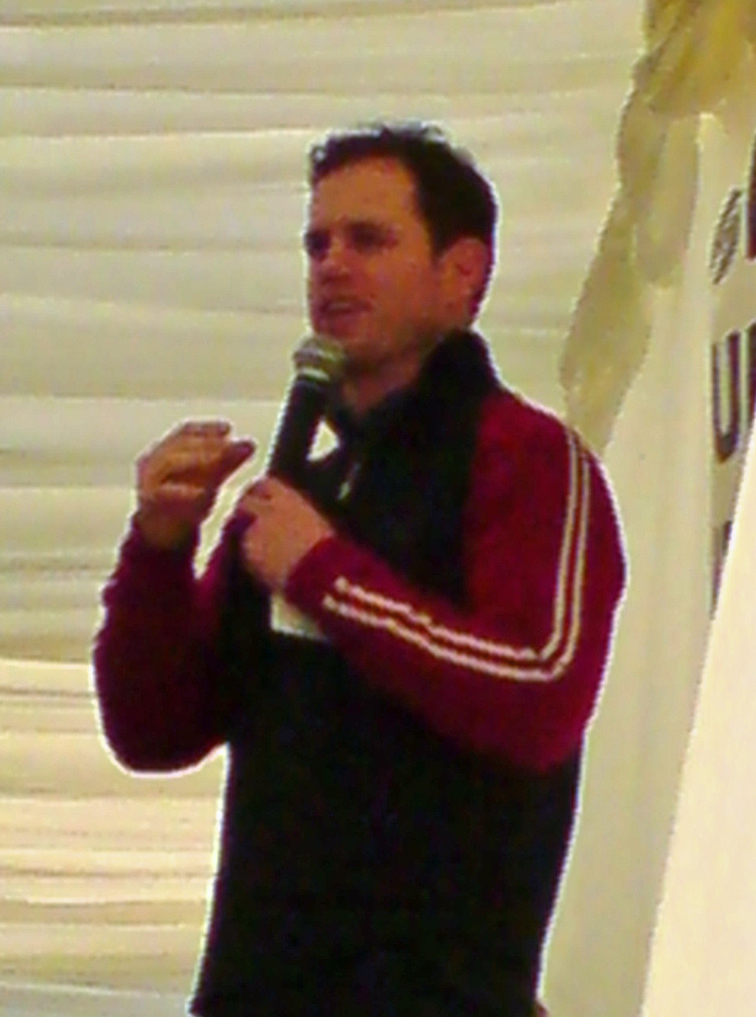
- Bracken at England vs. Wales, during the 2008 Six Nations
- Born: Kyran Paul Patrick Bracken; 22 November 1971 (age 54) Dublin, Ireland
- Height: 1.80 m (5 ft 11 in)
- Weight: 82 kg (12 st 13 lb; 181 lb)
- School: Stonyhurst College
- University: University of Bristol
- Notable relative(s): Charlie Bracken; Jack Bracken

Rugby union career
- Position: Scrum-half
Amateur team(s)
| Years | Team | Apps | (Points) |
- Waterloo
Senior career
| Years | Team | Apps | (Points) |
| 1992–1996 | Bristol | 47 | (35) |
| 1996–2006 | Saracens | 128 | (50) |
- Correct as of 2014-06-20
International career
| Years | Team | Apps | (Points) |
| 1993–2003 | England | 51 | (15) |

Kyran Paul Patrick Bracken MBE (born 22 November 1971) is a world-cup winning former rugby union footballer who played at scrum-half for Saracens, Bristol and Waterloo.

He won a total of 51 England caps and captained the team on three occasions, retiring from international rugby in 2004.

== Early life ==
Bracken was born in Dublin, Ireland. His father was a dentist and his mother had played hockey for Ireland. They originally lived in Skerries but moved to England when Bracken was four.

He was brought up in Liverpool and was educated at St. Edward's College, and later at Stonyhurst College in Lancashire, where he was coached by former England Rugby Union Head Coach, Brian Ashton. He attended a trial for Liverpool FC and scored three goals. He also flirted with the idea of playing rugby league for St. Helens.

After school he studied law at the University of Bristol whom he represented at rugby union and later qualified as a solicitor. He was turned down by Ireland as 'not good enough' but signed up by Bristol.

== Rugby career ==
Bracken made his England debut in November 1993 against the All Blacks. However, a stamp from Jamie Joseph seriously injured his ankle, putting him out of action for three months and leaving him with a permanent weakness. He started the 1994 Five Nations, but was dropped halfway through in favour of Dewi Morris. He missed the summer tour to South Africa, studying for law exams, but played in the 1995 Five Nations. Injury kept him out of the 1995 World Cup.

Bracken joined Saracens in 1996 and was part of the team that won the Tetley's Bitter Cup against Wasps in 1998.

He missed out on selection for the 1997 British Lions tour to South Africa in favour of Matt Dawson and Austin Healey, but was called up as injury replacement for Rob Howley but did not play in the tests.

He then became an irregular scrum half for England, with Dawson generally having the upper hand but being frequently injured. Bracken himself had a serious back injury that kept him out for most of the 1999–2000 season, including the 1999 World Cup.

He missed out on selection for 2001 Lions tour to Australia, instead captaining England on a three match development tour of North America. By then he was mostly having to compete with Matt Dawson as first-choice scrum-half. In 2003 he played in the summer tour beating Australia and New Zealand. He appeared four times for England during the 2003 World Cup, mostly as a substitute or blood replacement, becoming a world-cup winner as England lifted the trophy. He won his 50th cap against Wales in the quarter-final, and gained his last cap in the semi-final against France.

Bracken was also the player who drew groans from the cast of Friends after being tackled in the episode "The One with All the Rugby".

== Dancing on Ice ==
Bracken starred in and won ITV's celebrity ice dancing competition Dancing on Ice in 2007, with partner Melanie Lambert. In the semi-final he received the highest score in the history of Dancing on Ice at that time (29.5 out of a possible 30) matched only by rival Clare Buckfield the next week. He was then voted into the final alongside actress Clare Buckfield and former Blue member Duncan James.

He won the final on 17 March 2007 after a performance which included the required element of "flying" on wires and a final performance of Bolero.

On 24 March 2007 he won the special edition of Dancing on Ice 'The Champion of Champions', after repeating his record 29.5-point score.

He toured with Holiday on Ice in their show "Romanza".

Bracken made an appearance during preparations for Dancing on Ice 2008, week 5, to help contestant and friend Steve Backley with his performance. After finishing the tour with Holiday on Ice Bracken has confirmed he was appearing in the Dancing on Ice Live tour 2008.

He also created his own Ice Party, held at the Hand Stadium, home of Clevedon Town, which starred himself, Clare Buckfield, Suzanne Shaw and many world-famous skaters.

Bracken placed 5th in the 2014 'all stars' series of Dancing on Ice being eliminated in the Quarter-Finals. He was partnered with professional ice skater Nina Ulanova.

== Media career ==
In 2020, Kyran launched a new podcast called Ruck It! with fellow England international Nick Easter.

== Personal life ==
Bracken and his wife, Victoria, have three sons, Charlie, Jack and Lochlan, and they live in Hadley Wood.

== Charitable work ==
Bracken is an Honorary President of the rugby charity Wooden Spoon improving the lives of disadvantaged children and young people in Britain and Ireland. He is also an Ambassador of the Royal National Children's Foundation (formerly the Joint Educational trust) which helps support vulnerable, disadvantaged young people at state and independent boarding schools throughout the UK.

In 2009 he presented awards for Amersham & Wycombe College in their first awards ceremony.
