= Peter Morley =

Peter Morley may refer to:

- Peter Morley (football club president) (1929–2013)
- Peter Morley (filmmaker) (1924–2016)
