= Simon Jordan =

English businessman and media personality (born 1967)

- Born: 24 September 1967 (age 58); Thornton Heath, South London, England
- Education: Purley High School for Boys
- Occupations: Crystal Palace chairman (2000–2010); Chairman of The Club Bar and Dining Group (2006–2017); Founder Aspiration films; Chairman Octane Media (2006); Managing Director of The Pocketphone Shop (1994-2000); Talksport Jim White & Simon Jordan 10am to 1pm weekdays
- Partner: Michelle Dewberry
- Children: 2

Simon Jordan (born 24 September 1967) is an English businessman and media personality. He is the former chairman of Crystal Palace, and is currently a co-presenter on the Talksport weekday mid-morning sports programme, White and Jordan, along with Scottish presenter Jim White. He is a former columnist for The Observer and writes a regular lead opinion column for the Daily Mail.

Jordan made his fortune in the mobile phone industry. In 2002, he co-founded the car magazine Octane, selling his 50% shareholding in 2006. In 2006, he opened the restaurant Club Bar and Dining in London's Warwick Street, and sold it in 2011.

== Career ==
=== Crystal Palace ===
Jordan and Briggs left Pocket Phone Shop in 2000 after selling the company to One2One for reportedly circa £80m. That year, Singapore financier Jerry Lim bought Crystal Palace, who had been hours from extinction, from the administrators, and immediately sold it on to Jordan. Then aged 32, Jordan immediately appointed himself chairman, making him the youngest chairman of a Football League club. Having been born "100 yards from the ground" Jordan had been a lifelong fan, and he noted: "I have been prepared to put my money into something I truly believe in, and my first job is to turn the fortunes of this club around." Jordan also vowed that the club would be promoted to the Premiership, within five years. They achieved this in four years. Despite owning the club, Jordan did not own the ground, which belonged to Ron Noades, who had been chairman from 1981 to 1998.

Jordan announced in July 2008 that he planned to sell the club and move away from football, stating he had "been disillusioned with football for a long time". This occurred following a Football Association tribunal's decision on the John Bostock transfer to Tottenham Hotspur, after which Jordan stated: "It's a panel of halfwits". Palace were awarded only £700,000, having valued Bostock at £5 million.

No potential buyers came forward to make a bid for Crystal Palace, and the club became embroiled in deep financial trouble. Rumours persisted of personal financial difficulties as Jordan faced cash flow problems relating to wage payments at the club in November and December 2009. On 26 January 2010 Crystal Palace went into administration and Jordan's ownership came to an end.

==== Managers ====
Jordan gained a reputation as a hirer-and-firer of managers early in his Crystal Palace ownership, though this changed as his reign progressed. Between 2000 and 2003 five managers departed the manager's post: Steve Coppell (August 2000), Alan Smith (April 2001), Steve Bruce (November 2001), Trevor Francis (April 2003), and Steve Kember (November 2003). Of these, only Coppell and Bruce left of their own accord, with Coppell's departure brought about by a personality clash and Bruce's resignation leading to a High Court case.

Iain Dowie was appointed in December 2003 and the club went up the table from the relegation zone to win promotion in May 2004, beating West Ham United at Cardiff's Millennium Stadium in the play-off final, fulfilling Jordan's promise of promotion within five years. However, the club remained in the Premier League for just one season, before being narrowly relegated in 2005. In May 2006, having accepted Dowie and Jordan had differences but the same goal, Dowie left the club by mutual consent. However, towards the end of the month, Dowie joined Charlton Athletic as their new manager, prompting Jordan to issue a legal writ against him, claiming Dowie had lied about his reasons for departure.

Peter Taylor, a former Crystal Palace player, was installed on 13 June 2006. However, his tenure lasted just 16 months, ending on 8 October 2007 with the sack. Jordan stated he wanted Taylor to be remembered as a good player for Crystal Palace rather than a bad manager. On 11 October, at a press conference, he unveiled Neil Warnock as the new manager, which failed to surprise many, as the two were reported to be good friends. The club embarked on a superb run of form that saw them move from the relegation places into the 2007–08 season play-offs, but the relationship between the pair ended in a dispute after Warnock left the club to join Queens Park Rangers following the Eagles entering administration.

==== Dowie court case ====
Jordan succeeded in his High Court battle against Dowie, with Mr Justice Tugendhat ruling that Dowie had lied when negotiating his way out of his contract at Crystal Palace. Dowie won the right to appeal against that decision, leading to it being heard in the Court of Appeal. In April 2008, Crystal Palace settled out of court with Dowie.

==== Selhurst Park ====
In October 2006, Jordan claimed to have purchased the freehold to Selhurst Park from Ron Noades for £12 million, using an investment mechanism that kept his identity secret. He claimed the obfuscation had been necessary due to the "very, very difficult" relationship he had with Noades. Crystal Palace were now seen to be safe for the future. It later transpired that the freehold had been bought by the company Selhurst Park Limited, which was owned by another company. A maze of ownership finally showed the legal ownership being 60% Paul Kemsley and 40% a venture capital company owned by HBOS. Jordan has since offered the freehold for sale with the intention of taking back a long lease on the property. Simon Jordan's exact position on the freehold was unknown, although Jordan later agreed a 25-year lease for Selhurst Park. Selhurst Park Limited later went into administration (separate from Crystal Palace's own administration), leading to the stadium being purchased by the CPFC 2010 consortium, led by Steve Parish at the same time as the consortium buying Crystal Palace.

=== Journalism ===
As of the 2005–06 season, Jordan wrote a fortnightly column for The Observer newspaper. A column in which he said football agents should be neutered led to him being charged by the Football Association with bringing the game into disrepute. The case was heard on 7 December 2005 with a charge of improper conduct proven. Jordan was given a suspended fine of £10,000. But, backed by other journalists and by media advisor Max Clifford, Jordan indicated his intention to appeal, stating "I didn't start this fight, but it's not something I'm going to walk away from." His appeal was heard on 10 April, and was rejected by the three-member panel, two votes to one. Jordan commented in his 16 March column in The Observer that he and his advisors were "now considering taking this through the courts. Any legal action I take won't be about wasting time or resources on a petty point of principle – it'd be an attempt to see the whole thing unravel."

Jordan also used the column to highlight the inconsistencies in the F.A. disciplinary panel. The same panel decided no disciplinary action would be taken against Paul Jewell, manager of Wigan, who had been charged on the basis of making comments similar to Jordan's. Jordan described the compliance process as being "based on mood", noting: "There's no frame of reference, no consistency – and, yes, it's personal. It amounts to me not being able to say a referee is incompetent while others can, using the same language."

Whilst awaiting the outcome of the appeal, it appeared as though the events were having an effect upon him, as on 26 February 2006 it was reported by The News of the World newspaper that Jordan was tired of being chairman, and wanted to go back to being a regular fan. He has since reported in his 5 March 2006 Observer column, that he was misquoted and that he had simply restated what he had said eight months before, that "I don't plan to stay at Crystal Palace or in football all my life. I'd like to return to the stands 'as quickly as possible', but I won't sell until I've secured a sound legacy – Premiership football and a new ground"

Jordan stopped writing for The Observer in the 2006–07 season. He started writing again with his own column entitled "Simon Jordan’s Big opinion" in The Sun from August 2019 to November 2020.

=== Media ===
Aside from appearances in football-related programmes, Jordan's first major TV appearance was in early 2007, appearing in Fortune: Million Pound Giveaway for ITV along with fellow millionaires the Ann Summers managing director Jacqueline Gold (daughter of West Ham chairman David Gold); entrepreneur Duncan Bannatyne; MOBO Awards founder Kanya King; and former Conservative Member of Parliament-turned-novelist Jeffrey Archer.

In 2017, Jordan appeared on episodes of the Sky Sports late night discussion show, The Debate. In May 2019, Jordan appeared on BBC's Question Time.

In 2018, Jordan began a relationship with the sports broadcaster Talksport, featuring on shows with Danny Kelly and being nominated for sports pundit of the year in 2019. In 2020 after the success of his appearances, he joined Jim White on one of Talksport's flagship shows. As of 2022, he often appears with Danny Murphy and Martin Keown.

From April 2023 to December 2024, Jordan hosted the podcast 'Up Front' in partnership with William Hill.

=== Film production ===
In 2006 Jordan part funded and executively produced Sweeney Todd, a film featuring Ray Winstone and Tom Hardy.

In 2008, Jordan produced the film version of Telstar based on the play about the life of record producer Joe Meek. The film followed Jordan's production of the play of the same title at London's New Ambassadors Theatre. The film was solely funded by Jordan and featured Kevin Spacey, James Corden and JJ Feild. It was reasonably well received by critics opening in 45 screens in the UK and selling releases in 32 countries.

=== Author ===
In 2012, Jordan published an account of his life: an autobiography called Be Careful What You Wish For. The book recounts his business success in the cellular phone business, but mostly focuses on his time as the youngest-ever owner of a professional football club, as chairman of Crystal Palace Football Club.

The book was a critical and commercial success; it was published by Random House, achieved an award at The British Sport books awards, and was a finalist in the William Hill sports awards.

== Personal life ==
It was reported by the Daily Mirror's website in January 2006 that Jordan had bought girlfriend Meg Mathews (the former wife of Oasis guitarist Noel Gallagher) a Porsche worth £100,000 for Christmas, along with a personalised number plate, and that the couple had been together since July 2005. However Jordan gave details of the ending of this relationship in March 2006, admitting that it had been Mathews who had ended the relationship, while attacking the News of the World, which had reported that Jordan had "ditched Mathews" the week before. Jordan wrote of the matter in his Observer column, "the piece belittled someone who has been very important to me over the last nine months."

In October 2006, a woman, Tara Stout, was found guilty of harassing Jordan and a restraining order was issued.

Jordan has a daughter with his ex-partner Suzi Walker, born in January 2008.

In 2012, Jordan said he "blew" his £75 million fortune, with £40 million lost on his Crystal Palace venture. On 21 March 2018, Jordan was robbed of his £100,000 watch during a gunpoint robbery in Croydon, South London.

Jordan is in a relationship with businesswoman and broadcaster Michelle Dewberry, and in July 2020, the couple had a boy. Jordan has resided in Marbella and London.

On 8 August 2023, Jordan told Talksport that he was recovering from prostate cancer, and urged men as young as late thirties to get the PSA blood test. Dewberry replayed the interview on her GB News programme that day, saying she was proud of him.

Business positions
Preceded by Peter Morley	Crystal Palace F.C. chairman 2000–2010	Succeeded by Martin Long; Steve Parish
