= Bank of Hollywood =

- Genre: Reality
- Country of origin: United States
- Original language: English
- No. of seasons: 1
- No. of episodes: 8

Production
- Running time: 22 minutes

Original release
- Network: E!
- Release: December 14, 2009 – February 8, 2010

Bank of Hollywood is an American reality television series. Hosted by Bryan Callen, the show airs on E!. It is based on the British series Fortune: Million Pound Giveaway, in which contestants must appeal to a celebrity panel to receive money, and produced by Ryan Seacrest.

The panel consists of four celebrities:

- Melody Thornton – The Pussycat Dolls
- Candy Spelling – author, entrepreneur, mother of actress Tori Spelling, and wife of late film and television producer, Aaron Spelling
- Vanessa Rousso – professional poker player (and later, Big Brother contestant)
- Sean Patterson – president of Wilhelmina Models

== Production ==
The series is taped in Los Angeles. Production on the show started in October 2009, as stated by Melody Thornton on her Twitter account page. Eight episodes have been confirmed as planned on E!. The series premiered on E! December 14, 2009.

== Episodes ==
| No. | Title | Original release date |
|---|---|---|
| 1 | "Boy Wonder, Balloon Maker and a Big Request" | December 14, 2009 |
| 2 | "Dancers, Determination and a Driving Disaster" | December 21, 2009 |
| 3 | "Gold Digger, Goal Seeker and Rock and Roll" | December 28, 2009 |
| 4 | "Sashes, Soul Food and Smiles" | January 4, 2010 |
| 5 | "Mullets, Models and Muppets" | January 11, 2010 |
| 6 | "Tattoos, Tacklers and Tree House Dwellers" | January 25, 2010 |
| 7 | "Pirates, Paris and Parents-to-be" | February 1, 2010 |
| 8 | "Harleys, Hunks and Heavy-lifting" | February 8, 2010 |

== British version ==
The original British version of the show under the name Fortune: Million Pound Giveaway hosted by Richard Madeley was aired on ITV from January 2, 2007, until February 13, 2007.
