= Muschett v HM Prison Service =

Muschett v H M Prison Service
- Court: Court of Appeal of England and Wales
- Full case name: Eric Muschett v H M Prison Service
- Decided: February 2, 2010
- Citation: [2010] EWCA Civ 25

Court membership
- Judges sitting: Thorpe LJ, Wilson LJ and Rimer LJ

Case opinions
- Rimer LJ

Keywords
- Implied contract, discrimination, mutuality of obligation

Muschett v H M Prison Service [2010] EWCA Civ 25 is a UK labour law case, which held that an agency worker had no right to claim discrimination from either the agency or the place of work.

The decision has been criticised as failing to comply with the Race Equality Directive, the existing UK discrimination legislation (now codified in the Equality Act 2010) and principles of contractual construction in the common law.

== Facts ==
Mr Muschett had enrolled with a subsidiary of an employment agency named Brook Street plc, and he was sent on temporary assignment to HM Prison Service at the Feltham Young Offenders Unit, hoping this would lead to a permanent post. He had no written contract with the prison, and his wages were paid by the agency which made tax and national insurance deductions. After four months his job was terminated, and he brought claims for unfair and wrongful dismissal, and discrimination on grounds of sex, race and religion against both the prison service and the agency. HM Prison Service argued he was not an employee under ERA 1996 section 230.

Employment Tribunal found no employment contract existed with either the prison or the agency. There was no mutuality of obligation, because both sides were entitled to terminate the job at any time. EAT upheld the tribunal. Mr Muschett argued that as a litigant in person, the employment judge should have a duty to help unearth relevant facts, and that the EAT had not properly considered whether a contract could be implied, or the wider definition of ‘employee’ in the Race Relations Act 1976 section 78, and the analogous equality laws.

== Judgment ==
Rimer LJ held a Tribunal judge had no inquisitorial duties or duties to help improve a litigant in person’s case. The Tribunal’s finding that Mr Muschett had never been an employee was unimpeachable. The question was whether under RRA 1976 section 78 there could be found a contract ‘personally to execute any work or labour’. As the EAT had found, because Mr Muschett was under no obligation to the Prison Service and could terminate the engagement at any time by giving the agency notice, Mr Muschett was merely a temporary agency worker. Implying a contract of employment was not necessary. Nothing less than necessity would do. A finding that Mr Muschett was under no contractual obligation to work was fatal.

Thorpe LJ and Wilson LJ concurred.

== See also ==
- UK labour law
