= Queens Park Community School =

Location
- Aylestone Avenue; Brent, London, NW6 7BQ; England; 51.5404°N 0.2184°W

Information
- Type: Academy
- Motto: Quality, Progress, Creativity and Success
- Established: 1989
- Department for Education URN: 138609 Tables
- Ofsted: Reports
- Headteacher: Judith Enright
- Gender: Coeducational
- Age: 11 to 19
- Enrolment: 1286
- Website: http://www.qpcs.brent.sch.uk

Queens Park Community School (commonly abbreviated to QPCS) is a secondary school and sixth form with academy status, located in Queen's Park, in the London Borough of Brent, England.

== History ==
=== Merger ===
Opened in 1989, Queens Park Community School is the result of an amalgamation of three schools during the 1980s. The three schools that were merged were South Kilburn High School (formerly Percy Road School), Aylestone Community School and Brondesbury and Kilburn High (commonly abbreviated to B&K). The latter was formed from the merger in 1973 of Kilburn Senior High School for Boys (KSH), and Brondesbury and Kilburn High School for Girls (BKHS). Both were successors to state grammar schools which were abolished by the local authority in 1967, the boys' grammar school being Kilburn Grammar School. The new school's logo, an image of three trees, represents this union of the three local secondary schools. The headteacher chosen to head the new school was Mary Norton. Norton headed the school from its formation through to her retirement from education in 2002.

== Present-day QPCS ==
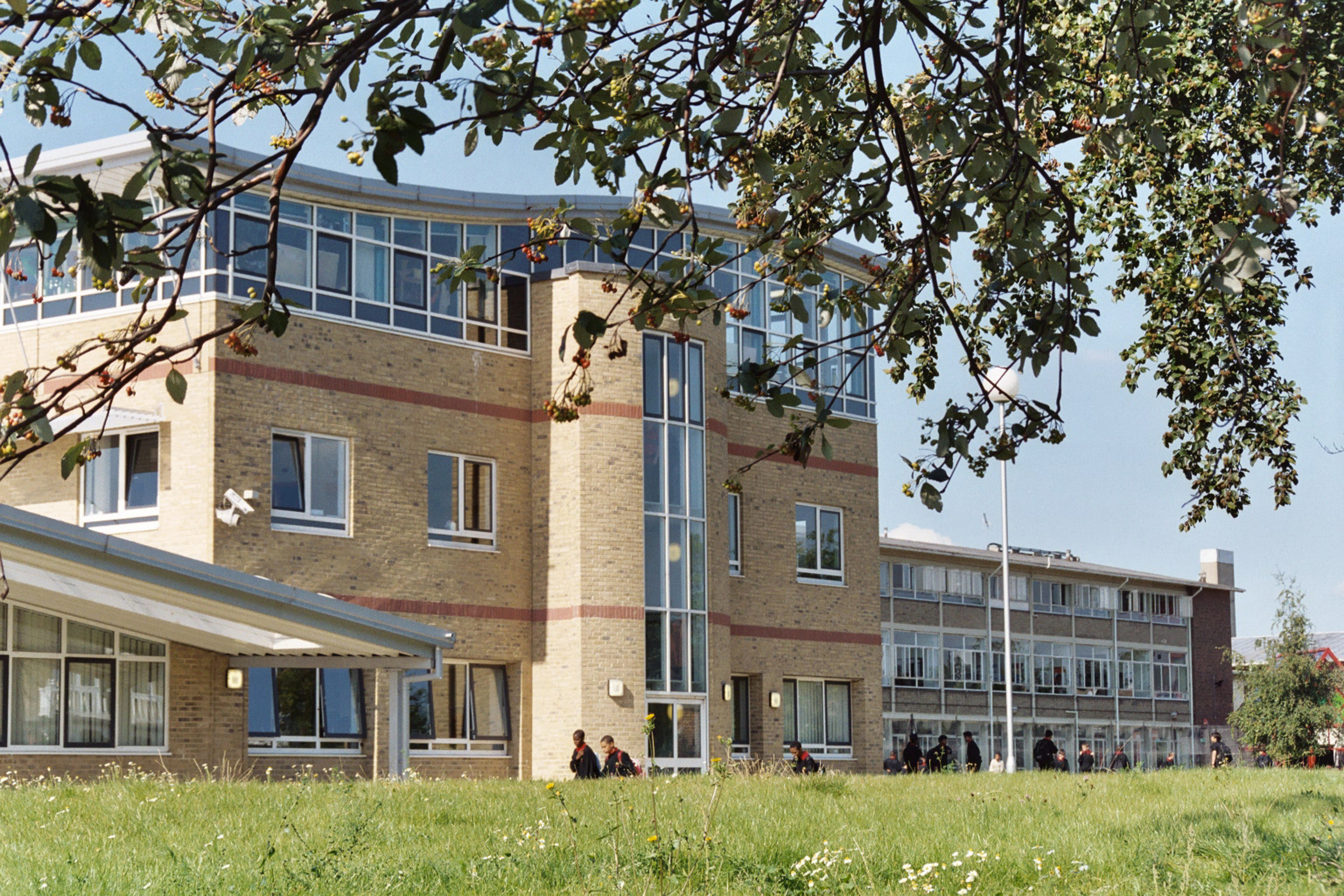
Front view of QPCS

The school had a new block funded through the millennium National Lottery fund at an estimated cost of £34.3 million. The building of this block involved demolishing one of the existing buildings. The new building was opened by Ken Livingstone with a plaque commemorating his visit. The school has been granted specialist school status in Business and Enterprise.

QPCS secured additional funding through the government's Excellence in Cities programme, which provided resources for schools, to provide extended activities and work for gifted and talented pupils.

In March 2012, QPCS applied for Artsmark status – it received the Gold award.

Queens Park Community School converted to academy status in September 2012.

=== QPCS City Learning Centre ===
The QPCS City Learning Centre (CLC) was one of 105 CLCs built by the DfES throughout the country. It was completed in 2003.

In 2015, funding for CLCs ceased and the CLC building has become part of the school's teaching accommodation.

== Notable former pupils ==
- Osman Kakay
- Kanya King, businesswoman and founder of the Mobo Awards
- Maria Lawson, R&B singer and X-Factor, 2004 finalist
- Tafari Moore
- Dominic Thompson (footballer)
- Caleb Watts
- Lava La Rue

=== Brondesbury and Kilburn High School ===
- Julie Covington, singer, notably of Don't Cry for Me Argentina
- Margery Hurst OBE, founder and managing director of Brook Street Bureau from 1947 to 1976
- Doreen Miller, Baroness Miller of Hendon, Conservative politician
- Twiggy, model, actress, and singer

=== South Kilburn High School ===
- Ngozi Fulani, charity executive
