= ManpowerGroup =

American staffing company

ManpowerGroup Inc.
- Horizontal version of logo (used since 2019)

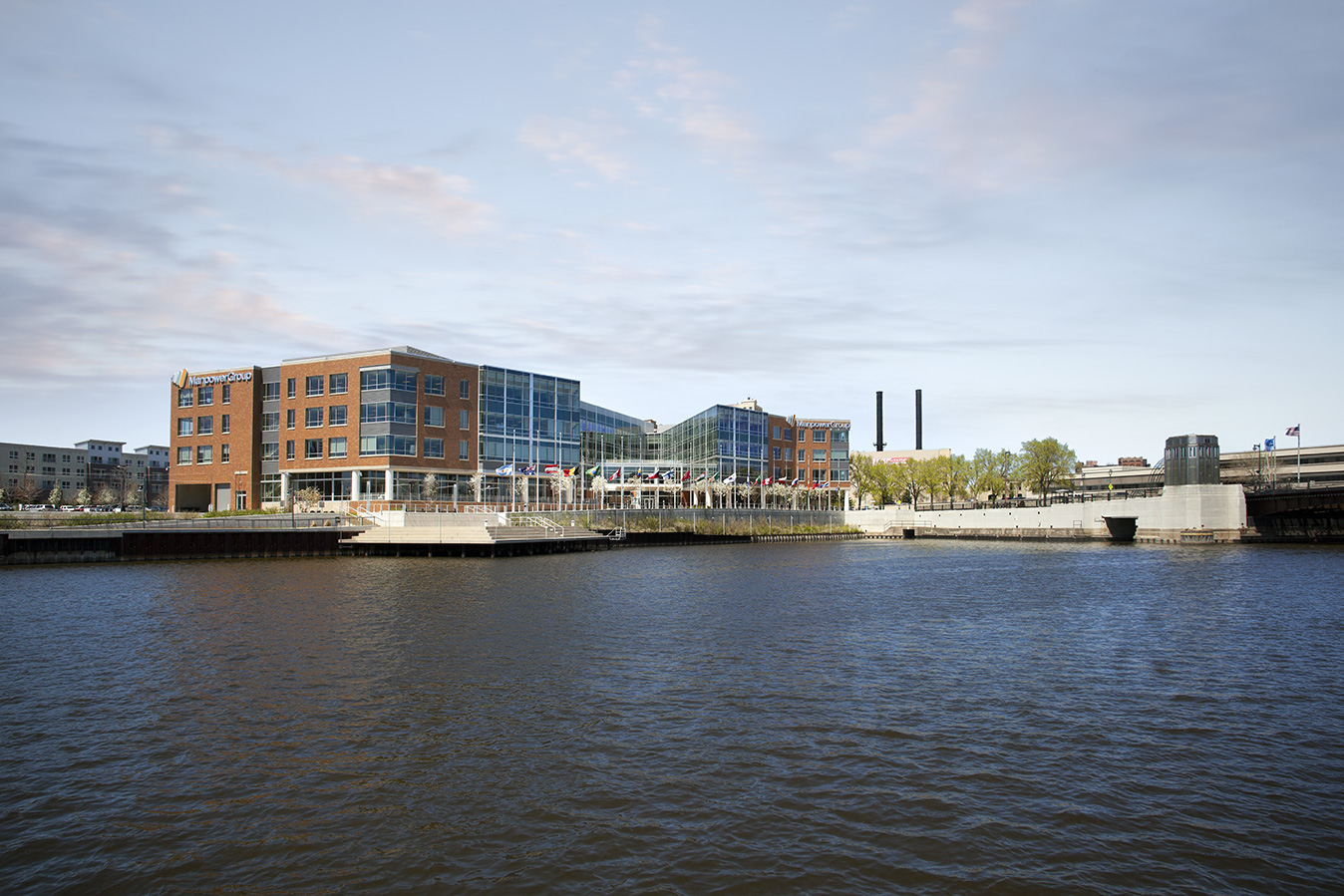
- ManpowerGroup World Headquarters in Milwaukee, pictured in 2007
- Formerly: Manpower Inc. (1948–89); Manpower PLC (1989–91); Manpower Inc. (1991–2011)
- Type: Public
- Traded as: NYSE: MAN; S&P 600 component
- Industry: Professional services
- Founded: 1948; 78 years ago Milwaukee, Wisconsin, U.S.
- Founders: Aaron Scheinfeld; Elmer Winter
- Headquarters: Milwaukee, Wisconsin, U.S.
- Number of locations: 2700 offices in 80 countries and territories (2017)
- Area served: Worldwide
- Key people: Jonas Prising (Chairman & CEO)
- Brands: Manpower; Experis; Right Management; ManpowerGroup Solutions
- Services: Career Management; Outsourcing; Recruitment and Assessment; Training and Development; Workforce Consulting
- Revenue: ▲US$20.724 billion (2021)
- Operating income: ▲US$585 million (2021)
- Net income: ▲US$382 million (2021)
- Total assets: ▲US$9.828 billion (2021)
- Total equity: ▲US$2.531 billion (2021)
- Number of employees: 30,000 (FTE 2021); 600,000 workers (2021)
- Divisions: Americas; AP ME; Northern Europe; Right Management; Southern Europe
- Subsidiaries: Brook Street; CareerHarmony; Econometrix; FuturSkill; Proservia; Supplay; TAPFIN; Veritaaq
- Website: www.manpowergroup.com

ManpowerGroup (formerly known as Manpower Inc.) is an American multinational corporation headquartered in Milwaukee, Wisconsin. Founded in 1948 by Elmer Winter and Aaron Scheinfeld, ManpowerGroup is the third-largest staffing firm in the world behind Swiss firm Adecco and Dutch firm Randstad NV. The company provides administrative & support services, professional services, and business services through its four primary brands: Manpower (contingent staffing and permanent recruitment), Experis (resourcing and project management), Right Management (career management, workforce consulting, and training and development), and ManpowerGroup Solutions (managed services and outsourcing).

== History ==
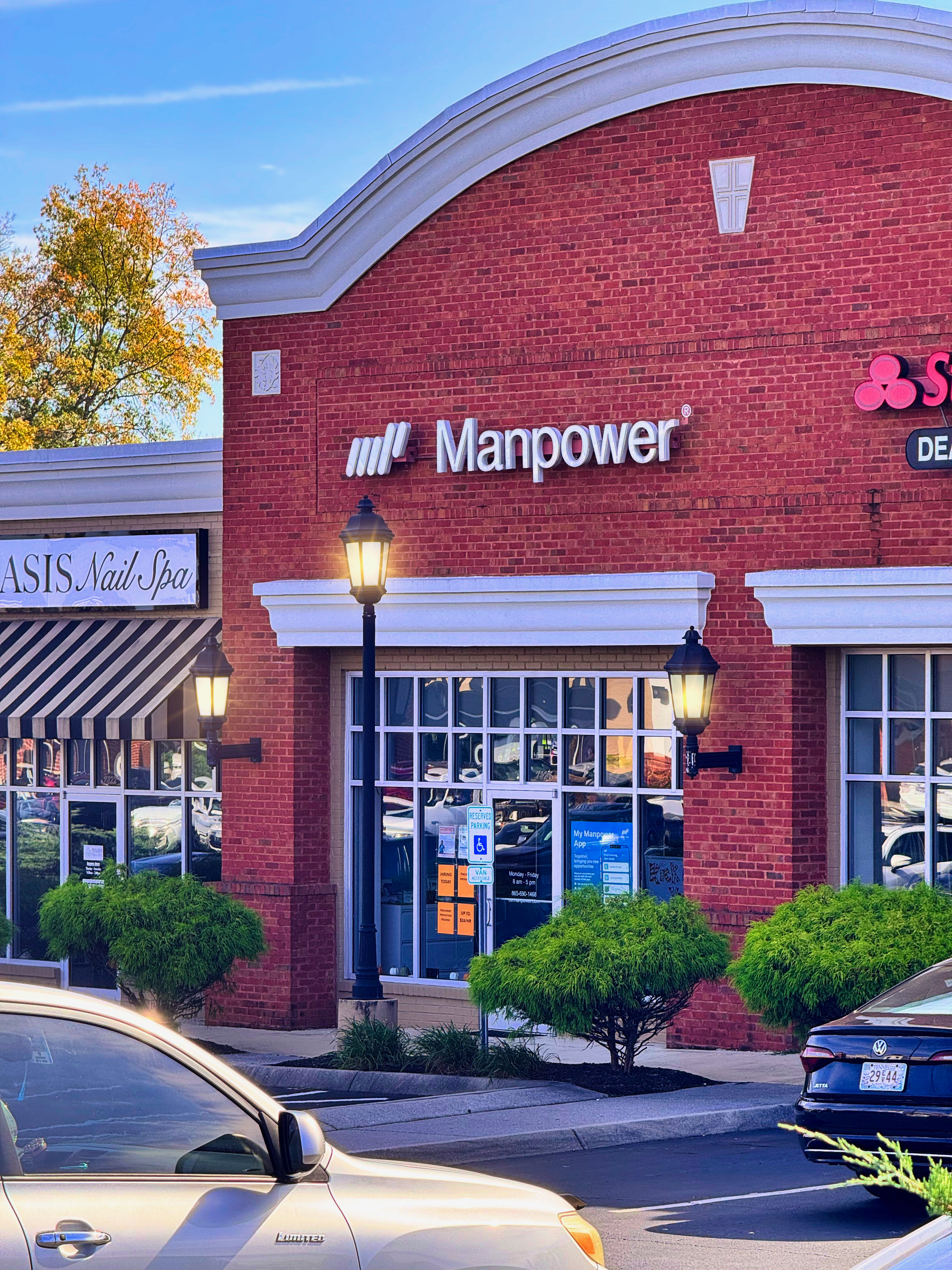
A ManpowerGroup staffing firm in Knoxville, Tennessee

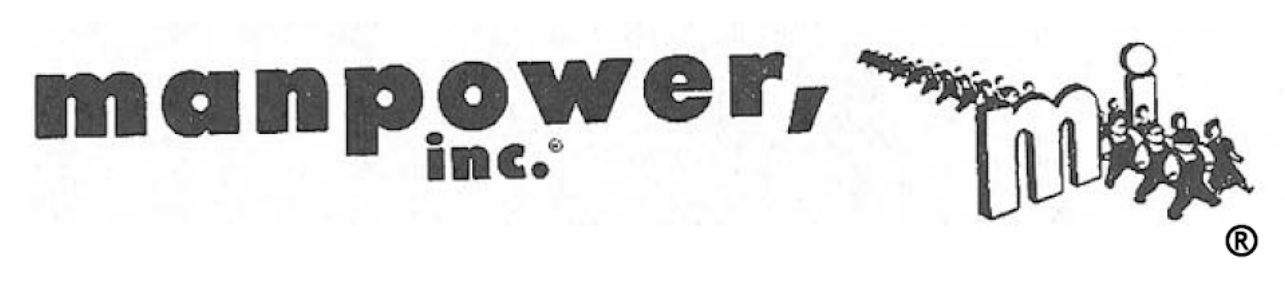
Manpower, Inc. logo in use from 1948 to the mid-1960s

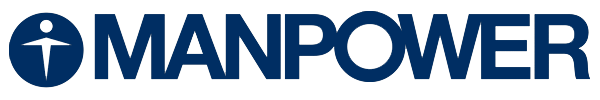
Manpower Inc. logo from 1967 to 2006

=== Founding and expansion (1948–1961) ===
In one version of the founding story, Elmer Winter and his law partner Aaron Scheinfeld co-founded Manpower in 1948. The pair was inspired when they found themselves looking for secretarial help to file a brief on a tight deadline with the Wisconsin Supreme Court. They raised $7,000 and opened their first storefront in Milwaukee with the name Manpower suggested by a friend.

In his book “A History of Manpower, Inc. 1948–1976”, James D. Scheinfeld writes a different version: Aaron Scheinfeld worked with a company on contracts to mothball military equipment at the close of World War II, and envisioned a temporary help service. By this account, in 1948, Scheinfeld conceived of Manpower, arrived at the name and early logo over lunch with friend and advertiser Marvin Frank, and invited Winter to invest as a minority stockholder and co-founder. The two incorporated the company in Delaware, and in June 1948, opened offices in downtown Milwaukee and Chicago.

By 1952, Manpower had expanded in the US to Minneapolis, Cleveland, Cincinnati, New York, Pittsburgh, and Boston; in 1954, the company offered its first franchise; in 1956, the company went international with offices in Montreal, Toronto, and the UK; and in 1957, Manpower established operations in France.

Historian Louis Hyman says Manpower started supplying workers to replace unexpected absences like people calling in sick. Due to the limited size of this market, it then attempted to expand to replacing full-time workers wholesale with rented talent, but found resistance in an era when corporations valued stability, and subscribed to the notion that married white men needed stable jobs to be breadwinners for their families.

=== The White Glove Girl and public offering (1966–1975) ===
The growing temporary employment category has been said to be a new category of work intentionally exempt from union protections. “To avoid union opposition, they developed a clever strategy, casting temp work as “women's work,” and advertising thousands of images of young, white, middle-class women doing a variety of short-term office jobs.” In 1961, Manpower spent $1 million to place advertisements in Sunday papers across the country featuring their “White Glove Girls”. Winter described the company's strategy: "We chose white gloves as a symbol … because they seem to represent everything that is feminine, neat, and proper. They symbolize quality and efficiency.” A 1962 advertisement from TIME features model Judy Newton who was the public face of Manpower in the 1960s as “The Girl in the White Gloves”. It cites Manpower's 240 offices in the US and Canada and 15 offices in Europe. It also specifies that the company offered the following divisions: Office Services, Industrial Help, Salespower, Inc., and Technical Services.

In “The Temp Economy: From Kelly Girls to Permatemps in Postwar America”, Hatton posits that the images in these advertisements were carefully curated to be “respectable sex symbols” and very purposefully not displaying images of men or nonwhites and emphasizing that the White Glove Girls were “specially certified” as code for white & middle-class and not recent immigrants or black migrants. A 1964 advertisement claims that the White Glove Girl carries an official training certificate that she is trained in: adapting quickly to new office routine, advanced telephone technique, dictation technique, transcribing services, good filing technique, fine points of electric typing, care of office equipment, keeping work confidential, starting the work day right, office etiquette, wardrobe and grooming, and dealing with office emergencies. The ad bills Manpower as the world's largest temporary help service with over 300 offices globally.

In 1962, Manpower went public, listing shares on the New York Stock Exchange.

By 1967, Manpower advertising claimed the company has over 500 offices throughout the world. The company opened its 100th foreign office and 500th office globally in Istanbul, Turkey on February 7, 1967. On March 31, 1967, Manpower registered 300,000 shares of common stock offered for sale at $28 per share. In 1968, Manpower Technical is established, expanding to offer specialized temporary employees outside office clerical and industrial settings.

=== Parker Pen Company (1975–1985) ===
On August 18, 1975, upon the retirement of co-founder Elmer Winter, the Parker Pen Company announced its acquisition of Manpower for $28.2 million. A new subsidiary of Parker would own 80% of the common stock, with the remaining 20% purchased by Mitchell S. Fromstein, Manpower Chairman of the Board.

In January 1985, Fromstein became President of Parker Pen; in October of the same year, Fromstein announced the private sale of the pen business as Manpower had grown to represent 90% of Parker's sales while the pen business struggled. Upon the completion of the sale, Parker Pen renamed itself Manpower Inc. and the sold Pen business retained the Parker Pen name.

=== Return to public company; takeover by Blue Arrow (1986–1990) ===
On June 27, 1986, Manpower went public once again, registering 300,000 shares of common stock with the SEC. On August 4, 1987, British firm Blue Arrow made a surprise bid to purchase Manpower for $1.2 billion in cash, or $75 a share for all 16 million outstanding shares. Blue Arrow intended to change Manpower into a full-service firm by adding permanent placement and executive recruiting services, cutting costs, and adding performance bonuses to employee compensation as they had done successfully with their 1985 purchase of Brook Street Bureau At the time, Manpower was virtually tied with Kelly Services for position as the largest American temporary services firm, each with 11%-12% market share. Blue Arrow was about 10% the size of Manpower; some analysts considered their takeover offer too low.

Manpower's board rejected the initial takeover offer, only to receive a new offer of $1.33 billion (or $82.50 a share) that they accepted on August 22. Along with the increased offer price, Blue Arrow agreed that the company would operate as a subsidiary retaining the Manpower name in the US, the Milwaukee office would remain open, and that Fromstein would stay on.

In the intervening weeks before accepting the Blue Arrow offer, Fromstein attempted to negotiate a joint venture with Adia S.A. to blunt the takeover; however, the Swiss employment firm decided not to proceed. Adia later went on to merge with French firm Ecco in 1996 to form Adecco.

The company resumed trading on the NYSE as MAN on October 3, 1988.

On December 7, 1988, Fromstein resigned as President and Chief Executive of Manpower, publicly stating that the decision was mutual. However, it was Blue Arrow CEO and Chairman Antony Berry who convinced the board to oust Fromstein, forcing him out of the company. In response, Fromstein mounted an effort backed by Manpower franchises in the US to replace Berry. Just a month later in January 1989, the board removed Berry as CEO and appointed Fromstein in the Blue Arrow chief executive role while Berry remained company chairman. Berry's removal came amid poor stock performance and a scandal as the British Department of Trade and Industry investigated NatWest bank, Blue Arrow's investment bank advisor for the Manpower purchase, over "an alleged stock-price support operation following the failure of the stock flotation." Charges were later filed in what became known as the Blue Arrow Affair in November 1989.

In April 1989, Fromstein consolidated his hold on Blue Arrow when the board removed Berry completely, appointing Fromstein as chairman. Later that year, Fromstein announced the intent to rename Blue Arrow PLC to Manpower PLC, commenting "since Manpower Inc represents over 75% of the company's revenues and profits and is the multinational brand among the company's holdings, it is appropriate to make this change." Ultimately, Manpower moved the head office from Britain back to Milwaukee.

=== Reorganization as Manpower Inc (1990–2005) ===
On January 31, 1990, Blue Arrow PLC announced its intent to re-incorporate in the United States as Manpower Inc. and to return its corporate headquarters to Milwaukee. This process completed in 1991 with the incorporation of Manpower Inc, a new publicly traded holding company that acquired Manpower PLC (the renamed Blue Arrow), which indirectly owned Manpower International Inc.

In 1999, Fromstein retired as president, CEO, and chairman of the board and is named chairman emeritus. Jeffrey Joerres was named the new president and CEO. The company rebranded Manpower Technical as Manpower Professional.

In January 2000, Manpower acquired Elan Group Ltd., a provider of IT staffing solutions based in the UK with operations in the Netherlands, Ireland, Switzerland, Germany, and Hong Kong, for $146.2 million. The company merged its IT staffing operations across Europe under the Elan brand. During 2000, Manpower launched The Empower Group, an independent operating division providing consulting services to multinational corporations in the UK, Australia, New Zealand, and the US. On July 9, 2001, Manpower closed on its acquisition of Jefferson Wells International, Inc., a provider of professional accounting and tax services in the US and Canada, for $174 million. On December 11, 2003, Manpower announced an agreement to acquire Right Management Consultants for $488 million or $18.75 per share, into which they merged Empower.

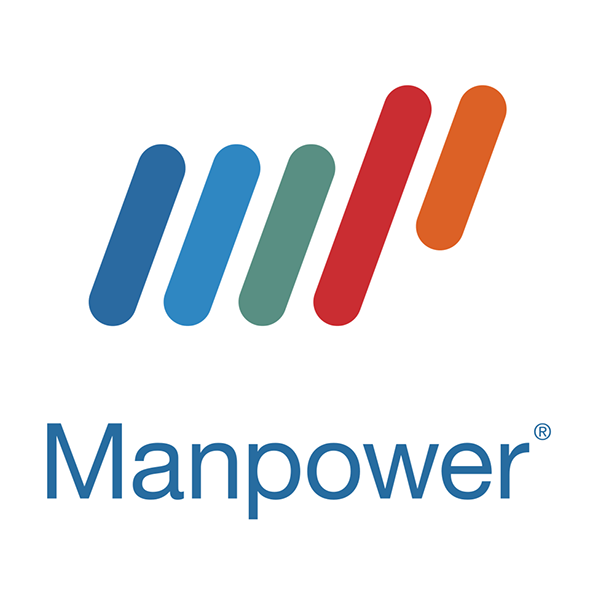
Manpower Inc. logo from 2006 to 2011

=== Global rebrand (2006–2011) ===
In 2006, the company announced a new global brand identity with a new logo, marketing materials, and advertising campaigns. The new brand was developed by the London office of Wolff Olins, with advertising developed by WPP's Grey Worldwide in New York and media strategy and planning by sister agency MediaCom.

According to the press release, “As part of the re-branding process, Manpower has streamlined its brand architecture from over 200 brands worldwide down to only five brands that now represent its total service offering. These brands are Manpower, Manpower Professional, Elan, Jefferson Wells and Right Management… The new Manpower logo consists of five oval shapes in five different colors, which comprise the initials "MP" and reflect the range of services that Manpower now offers.”

By 2007, under the name Manpower Business Solutions (MBS), the company provided task outsourcing, vendor management, onsite HR services, and Recruitment Process Outsourcing (RPO). In February 2010, Manpower agreed to acquire COMSYS IT Partners, Inc for $17.65 per share or a total of $431 million in half cash and half stock. The COMSYS acquisition included their Tapfin brand, expanding Manpower's investment in RPO and Managed Service Provider (MSP) offerings. On April 5, 2010, Manpower completed the COMSYS acquisition and integrated the company with Manpower Professional IT. Tapfin MSP and RPO offerings were integrated with Manpower Business Solutions.

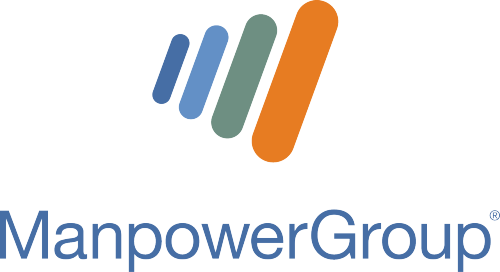
ManpowerGroup logo since 2011

=== Rebranding as ManpowerGroup (since 2011) ===
In 2011, the company rebranded itself to ManpowerGroup and organized itself into four primary brands: Manpower, Experis (formed from the combination of Manpower Professional, Elan, and Jefferson Wells), Right Management, and ManpowerGroup Solutions (formerly Manpower Business Solutions). The new corporate name was part of an effort to become known as a workforce solutions company versus a traditional employment agency. The new brand name Experis was intended to emphasize the concepts of experience and expertise. New corporate and brand logos derived from the current corporate logo with work from The Martin Agency of Richmond, VA.

On September 22, 2011, ManpowerGroup acquired 70% of Proservia SA, a French IT and systems engineering company. The remaining shares were acquired by November 2011 for a total of $29.4 million.

On May 1, 2014, Jonas Prising replaced Joerres as CEO and Joerres assumed the role of executive chairman. Joerres retired on December 30, 2015, and Prising replaced him as chairman while retaining his role as CEO.

On June 1, 2015, ManpowerGroup announced the acquisition of the Australian and Singapore divisions of Greythorn and its subsidiary Marks Sattin. In August, 2015, the Experis division announced the acquisition of a majority stake in Veritaaq, a Canadian IT consulting firm. On September 3, 2015, ManpowerGroup acquired 7S Group GmbH, a German HR services firm, for $140.4 million. In 2016, and 2017, ManpowerGroup purchased several divisions of Ciber in Europe: Ciber Netherlands, Ciber Norway, and Ciber Spain. In August 2021, Manpower acquired IT resourcing and services provider Ettain Group for $925 million.

== Subsidiaries ==
ManpowerGroup owns hundreds of subsidiary companies around the world, the majority of which operate under the company's four primary brands: Manpower, Experis, Right Management, or ManpowerGroup Solutions. The company does, however, operate several independent brands and joint ventures.

These subsidiaries include:
Adecco Jobs Solutions Group
Adecco Jobs Solutions
The Adecco Jobs Solutions Group

Manpower Jobs Solutions - greencard, visa CH EU - Switzerland

Manpower Jobs Generations Greencard, jobs, visa EU - CH - Schwitzerland

- Econometrix
- Tapfin
- ManpowerGroup Public Sector (US)
- Proservia (France and elsewhere in Europe)
- FuturSkill (France)
- Supplay (France)
- Experis-Veritaaq (Canada)
- The SJB Group (UK)
- Greythorn (Australia)
- Marks Sattin (Australia and Singapore)
- Lundi (US)
- Arcqus (Germany)
- AviationPowerGroup, a joint venture with Lufthansa Technical Training (Germany and the UK)
- Bankpower, a joint venture with Deutsche Bank (Germany)
- Montaplan (Germany)
- Shoga (Germany)
- Siebenlist, Grey & Partner (Germany)
- SPLU (Germany)
- Stegdoc (Germany)
- Stegmann (Germany and Belgium)
- Stegmed (Germany)
- Vivento Interim Services (VIS), a joint venture with Deutsche Telekom (Germany)
- Avan (Norway)
- Experis Ciber (Norway, Spain, and the Netherlands – purchased from Ciber)
- Workshop Bemanning & Kompetanse (Norway)
- iSense ICT Professionals (Netherlands)
- PEAK-IT (Netherlands)
- Salarisprofs (Netherlands)
- Job Support Power (Japan)
- Pro-Hunt (Japan)
- Event Elite (Hong Kong)
- Shivford Manpower (india)
- Adecco Jobs Solutions

== See also ==
- Professional employer organization
- Employment agency
- Recruitment
- Temporary work
- UK agency worker law
- Casual work
