= Fortune: Million Pound Giveaway =

- Genre: Reality; Business; Talent show
- Created by: Fever Media
- Presented by: Richard Madeley
- Judges: Jeffrey Archer; Duncan Bannatyne; Jacqueline Gold; Simon Jordan; Kanya King
- Country of origin: United Kingdom
- No. of series: 1
- No. of episodes: 7

Production
- Running time: 60 minutes
- Production company: Fever Media

Original release
- Network: ITV
- Release: 2 January – 13 February 2007

Fortune: Million Pound Giveaway is a British television show hosted by Richard Madeley which first aired on ITV on Tuesday 2 January 2007. Over seven weeks, various members of the public appeared, several per show, and appealed before a panel of judges for money to fulfil ambitions or dreams. The show was made by Fever Media for ITV and was recorded between 10 December and 15 December 2006 at Three Mills Studios in Bow, London. Each day of this week several requests were filmed, and after recording was complete edited together to give a balanced series of seven programmes.

The concept is similar to that of BBC Two's Dragons' Den, also featuring Duncan Bannatyne.

== Judges ==
The panel consisted of five high-profile members, four of whom are multi-millionaires:

- Jeffrey Archer – best selling author, convicted criminal, former Member of Parliament and former Deputy Chairman of the Conservative Party.
- Duncan Bannatyne – entrepreneur, panel member of BBC Two's Dragons' Den and owner of Bannatyne Health and Fitness clubs
- Jacqueline Gold – Managing Director of Ann Summers and daughter of David Gold, the co-chairman of West Ham United F.C.
- Simon Jordan – mobile phone entrepreneur and the then owner of Crystal Palace F.C.
- Kanya King – founder of the MOBO Awards.

== First show ==
In the first episode, money was given to help two teenagers to travel around the British Isles' rail network, give a gospel choir a fifth anniversary celebration, donate money to a cancer charity and help a woman achieve her dream of seeing Native American landmarks.

== Second show ==
In the second episode, money was awarded to a talented 13-year-old boy who claimed he had been diagnosed as "exceptionally bright" and required £38,083.50 for a special course to further his education before university, a 24-year-old would-be JCB driver who required £2,050 for an entire course to live his dream, a woman was awarded £5,000 who wanted to throw her Nana a 60th birthday and £45,000 for a self-confessed reformed ex-criminal to help support a youth group in Grimsby. Money was not awarded to a man who wanted to jump into a 7-foot flaming toilet on a fire engine, four Welsh people to go to Russia to experience weightlessness for 50 seconds, nor for a would-be actress to attend a New York acting academy.

== Third show ==
The third episode showed a gifted athlete gain £30,000 to train for the 2012 Olympics, at £6,000/year as long as she remains in training. A man who had blown his fortune on high living was refused £25,000 to buy a racehorse and was scorned by the panel.

== Fourth show ==
In the fourth episode, the panel gave money to a history teacher called Dan Lyndon from Henry Compton School wishing to take 40 pupils to a World War I landsite, a wheel-chair basketball team wishing to employ new team members and to an old gentleman hoping to take his girlfriend on a romantic cruise to show how much he loved her. The panel also gave money to a woman who had recently lost her sister, and had now taken her two nieces into her home, already having four children of her own. The woman had a three-bedroomed semi-detached house, and had only one arm. She was also a special education teacher. The panel also gave her an extra £6,000 as her requested £14,000 was "not enough".

== American version ==
The American adaptation of the show under the title Bank of Hollywood hosted by Bryan Callen aired on E! network from 14 December 2009 until 8 February 2010.

== See also ==
- Bank of Hollywood
- Crowd Rules
