= Chloe Madeley =

English television personality

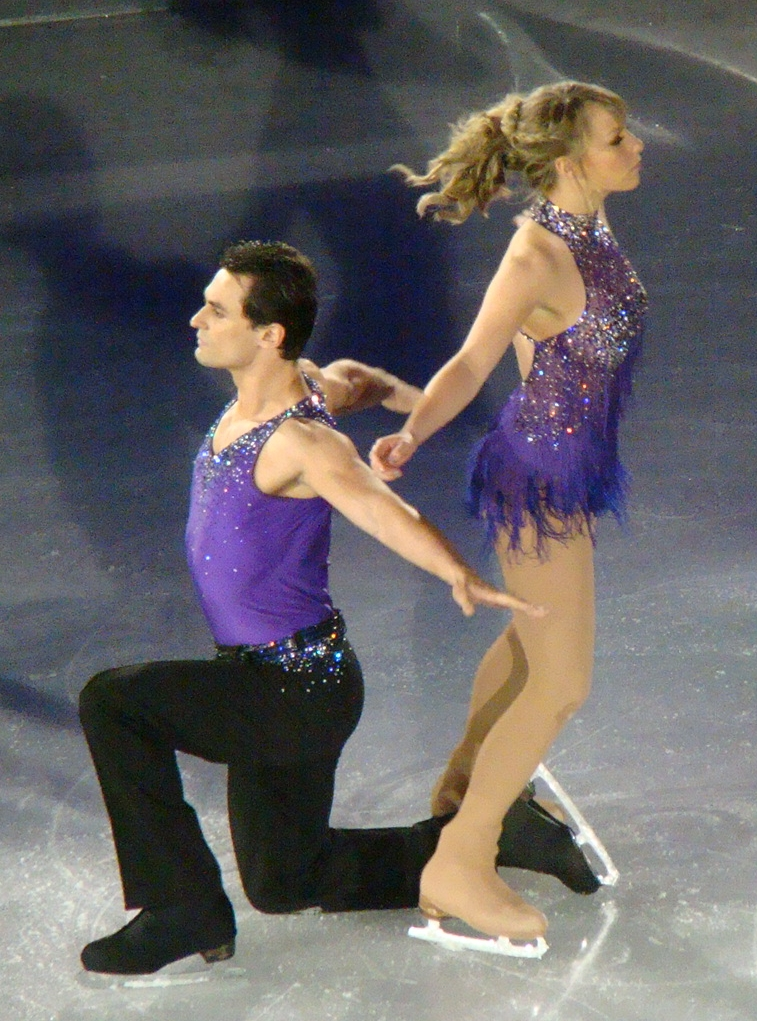
- Madeley with Michael Zenezini on the Dancing on Ice tour in 2011
- Born: Chloe Susannah Madeley; 13 July 1987 (age 39); Manchester, England
- Occupations: Television presenter; journalist; model; gym instructor; nutritionist
- Spouse: James Haskell (m. 2018; sep. 2023)
- Children: 1
- Parents: Richard Madeley (father); Judy Finnigan (mother)
- Website: chloemadeley.com

Chloe Susannah Madeley (born 13 July 1987) is an English personal trainer and reality television personality. She is the daughter of Richard Madeley and Judy Finnigan.

== Early life and education ==
Madeley was born in Manchester. She was educated at King Alfred School, an independent school in Hampstead, northwest London.

Madeley later attended Leeds Trinity & All Saints College for one term, before leaving to focus on her media career.

== Media career ==
Madeley's first role was presenting four episodes of Big Brother's Big Mouth in 2007. Madeley was introduced as the daughter of Richard and Judy, with British press commenting she was "little known" at the time. Ahead of her first show, Madeley said she was hoping to convince her father Richard Madeley to appear as a guest on the programme.

Following her debut, Madeley appeared ad-hoc as a roving reporter on her parents' eponymous talk show until its cancellation in 2009. She later presented for Teenage Cancer Trust and covered Live From Studio Five for one week in 2010.

Madeley has also pursued a career in modelling and journalism. She posed for a lads mag in 2008 and led a campaign for lingerie brand Ultimo in 2009. She later became a columnist for Now and launched her own blog called FitnessFondue.

Since 2010, Madeley's appearances in the public eye have largely been through reality television. She appeared on Celebrity Quitters in 2010, placed third on Dancing on Ice in 2011, and finished fifth on The Jump in 2015.

In 2016, Madeley appeared on Good Morning Britain to discuss receiving unkind comments on social media for being a muscular woman. She was challenged by presenter Piers Morgan who said she regularly posts her opinion on a healthy lifestyle so should be open to alternate views.

Madeley has also appeared alongside her father on Pointless Celebrities in 2017 and Small Fortune in 2019.

In June 2023, ITV commissioned At Home With the Madeley’s (w/t), an upcoming family reality show featuring Chloe Madley and her showbiz family.

== Personal life ==
Madeley is a qualified personal trainer and works as a fitness instructor alongside media work.

On 16 August 2009, Madeley was arrested and charged with drunk driving after her car was found crashed and rolled over in North London. This was confirmed by the Metropolitan Police. The court heard that she had two cocktails before the crash, and her car clipped another vehicle and overturned. She was disqualified from driving for 20 months.

Madeley married former England rugby union player James Haskell in 2018. Their daughter was born in August 2022. In October 2023, Madeley announced that she and Haskell had separated.
