= Blue Arrow =

United Kingdom based employment and recruitment agency

Blue Arrow Ltd
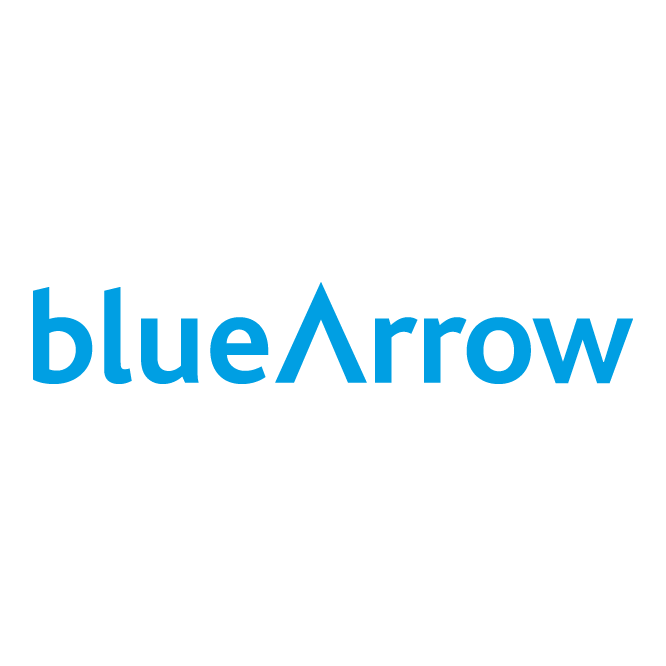
- Company type: Private limited company
- Industry: Recruitment
- Founded: 10th November 1959; 66 years ago
- Headquarters: London, UK
- Key people: Andy Hart (Managing Director)
- Products: Provide temporary and permanent staff to the following sectors: Hospitality; Manufacturing; Public service; Retail; Support services; Transport sectors
- Number of employees: circa 500
- Parent: RSS Global Ltd
- Website: www.bluearrow.co.uk

Blue Arrow Limited is a United Kingdom based employment and recruitment agency that places individual jobseekers in temporary and/or permanent catering, driving industrial and office roles across the hospitality, manufacturing, public service, retail, support services and transport sectors.

The head office is in Soho Square, London. Blue Arrow is now part of RSS Global Ltd, an international staffing business with operations in the UK, Ireland, Australia and New Zealand.

== History ==
On 10 November 1959, Blue Arrow (then named 'The Barnet Agency Ltd' and founded by Sheila Birch) was incorporated. On 12 October 1982, the company name was changed to 'Blue Arrow Personnel Services Ltd' and then finally to 'Blue Arrow Ltd' on 28 June 2000.

The company became listed on the Unlisted Securities Market in 1984. In June 1987, Blue Arrow acquired Manpower Inc., which was then the world's largest temporary employment agency, for $1.3bn.

In 1987, Blue Arrow was at the centre of a financial scandal when employees of National Westminster Bank's investment arm, County NatWest, covered up a failed issue of £873m of new stock (intended to finance the takeover of Manpower Inc.). Blue Arrow was cleared of any wrongdoing. In 1989, Tony Berry stepped down as CEO.

On 17 April 1996, the company was acquired by The Corporate Services Group plc. On 7 May 2008, the Corporate Services Group plc merged with Carlisle Group Limited to form one of the UK's largest recruitment groups, Impellam.

On 30 January 2023 Impellam Group plc announced that it would sell its Regional Specialist Staffing and Healthcare Staffing businesses (Medacs Global Group, Blue Arrow Group, Tate, Chadwick Nott and Career Teachers) to Twenty 20 Capital. On 3 March 2023, the disposal of the businesses to Twenty 20 Capital was completed, and RSS Global Ltd was formed.

== Trade memberships ==
- Institute of Hospitality
- Chartered Institute of Logistics and Transport (CiLT)
- Gangmasters Licensing Authority (GLA)
- Association of Labour Providers (ALP)
- Recruitment and Employment Confederation (REC)

== See also ==
- UK agency worker law
