= Dancing on Ice series 6 =

Sixth series of Dancing on Ice

Dancing on Ice
- Series 6
- Presented by: Phillip Schofield; Holly Willoughby
- Judges: Emma Bunton; Robin Cousins; Jason Gardiner
- Celebrity winner: Sam Attwater
- Professional winner: Brianne Delcourt
- No. of episodes: 23

Release
- Original network: ITV
- Original release: 9 January – 27 March 2011

Series chronology
- ← Previous; Series 5 Next → Series 7

The sixth series of Dancing on Ice aired from 9 January to 27 March 2011, on ITV. Phillip Schofield and Holly Willoughby returned as hosts, while Jayne Torvill and Christopher Dean returned as mentors. As part of a major revamp, the show moved from Elstree Studios to Shepperton Studios, where they unveiled a new set. It was the also the first series to be broadcast in HD.

Karen Barber, Emma Bunton, Robin Cousins, and Jason Gardiner returned, though Barber moved from the "Ice Panel" to head coach. Nicky Slater did not return as a judge and was not replaced. In another change, the judges gave scores out of 10.0 instead of 6.0, allowing for an overall total score of 30.0.

The line-up was revealed on 18 December 2010, and consisted of sixteen celebrities. The first two shows, on 9 and 16 January 2011, were billed as "qualifying" rounds, with eight couples skating in each, and two being eliminated each week. The remaining twelve couples progressed to the main competition, which started on 23 January.

A twist on 30 January saw the two celebrities with the lowest combined total of judges' scores and public votes compete in the skate-off as usual, but their fellow celebrities decided which team would stay in the competition instead of the judges.

On 6 March, the six remaining celebrities took part in the first ever team challenge. Following their standard performances, they were divided into two groups of three, with each group performing their own routine. The judges then decided which performance was best, and each celebrity on the winning team had their previous scores doubled. Two weeks later, on 20 March, the four remaining celebrities performed a solo routine following their standard performances.

The finale, on 27 March, was the first not to feature flying performances. Instead, the three remaining couples performed their own "showcase" routines, for which they were joined by four professional skaters. As before, one couple was eliminated before the final two couples performed the Boléro.

Former EastEnders actor Sam Attwater and Brianne Delcourt were announced as the winners.

== Couples ==
Sixteen celebrities signed up to compete on the sixth season of Dancing on Ice. Four of the contestants were eliminated in the two opening shows before the competition began properly.

Celebrity	Notability	Professional partner	Status
Angela Rippon	Television journalist & newsreader	Sean Rice	Did not qualify on 9 January 2011
Nadia Sawalha	EastEnders actress & television presenter	Mark Hanretty	Did not qualify on 9 January 2011
Craig McLachlan	Neighbours & Home and Away actor	Maria Filippov	Did not qualify on 16 January 2011
Elen Rivas	Model	Łukasz Różycki	Did not qualify on 16 January 2011
Steven Arnold	Coronation Street actor	Nina Ulanova	Eliminated 1st on 23 January 2011
Dominic Cork	International cricketer	Alexandra Schauman	Eliminated 2nd on 30 January 2011
Jennifer Metcalfe	Hollyoaks actress	Sylvain Longchambon	Eliminated 3rd on 6 February 2011
Comedy Dave	BBC Radio 1 presenter	Frankie Poultney	Eliminated 4th on 13 February 2011
Kerry Katona	Media personality & Atomic Kitten singer	Daniel Whiston	Eliminated 5th on 20 February 2011
Vanilla Ice	Rapper	Katie Stainsby	Eliminated 6th on 27 February 2011
Denise Welch	Actress & Loose Women panellist	Matt Evers	Eliminated 7th on 6 March 2011
Jeff Brazier	Television presenter	Isabelle Gauthier	Eliminated 8th on 13 March 2011
Johnson Beharry	British Army regiment soldier	Jodeyne Higgins	Eliminated 9th on 20 March 2011
Chloe Madeley	Freelance journalist & model	Michael Zenezini	Third place on 27 March 2011
Laura Hamilton	Children's television presenter	Colin Ratushniak	Runners-up on 27 March 2011
Sam Attwater	EastEnders actor	Brianne Delcourt	Winners on 27 March 2011

== Scoring chart ==
The highest score each week is indicated in bold green with a dagger (†), while the lowest score each week is indicated in italicized red with a double-dagger (‡).

Color key:

Winners
Runners-up
Third place
Bottom two or three
Eliminated

Dancing on Ice (series 6) - Weekly scores
Couple	Pl.	Week											
Couple	Pl.	Q1	Q2	1	2	3	4	5	6	7 (Note: This week featured team performances. The couples on the winning team had their scores doubled for the night.)	8	9	10
Sam & Brianne	1st	—N/a	**21**†	**25.0**†	**25.0**†	**25.5**†	**25.5**†	24.5	**27.0**†	25.5	24.5 (Note: This couple was in the bottom two or three, but was not eliminated.)	28.0+27.5=**55.5**†	29.5+28.5=**58.0**† (Note: This couple finished in first place.)
Laura & Colin	2nd	**16**†	—N/a	19.5	20.0	24.0	**25.5**†	**25.5**†	24.5	28.5×2=**57.0**†	25.5	28.0+26.5=54.5	26.0+30.0=56.0 (Note: This couple finished in second place.)
Chloe & Michael	3rd	—N/a	16	19.0	19.5	22.0	22.0	18.5	24.5	26.5	**27.0**†	21.0+20.0=41.0	25.5+28.5=54.0‡ (Note: This couple finished in third place.)
Johnson & Jodeyne	4th	11	—N/a	13.0	13.0	12.0	15.0	14.5	14.5‡	17.5‡	19.5‡	18.5+15.5=34.0‡ (Note: This couple was eliminated.)	
Jeff & Isabelle	5th	11	—N/a	11.0	12.5	20.0	22.0	16.0	22.5	22.5×2=45.0	21.5		
Denise & Matt	6th	—N/a	10	9.0	10.0‡	13.5	13.0	16.5	14.5‡	15.0×2=30.0			
Vanilla Ice & Katie	7th	15	—N/a	16.0	16.0	16.0	21.0	22.5	21.5				
Kerry & Daniel	8th	14	—N/a	14.0	10.0‡	10.0‡	12.0‡	9.0‡					
Comedy Dave & Frankie	9th	—N/a	11	9.5	11.0	11.0	12.5						
Jennifer & Sylvain	10th	—N/a	12	19.5	18.5	19.0							
Dominic & Alexandra	11th	—N/a	11	11.5	11.0								
Steven & Nina	12th	7‡	—N/a	7.0‡									
Elen & Lukasz		–	11										
Craig & Maria		–	9‡										
Nadia & Mark		9											
Angela & Sean		11											

== Weekly scores ==
=== Qualifying round 1 (9 January) ===
Only eight couples skated this week, with six going through to qualify for the competition. Couples are listed in the order they performed.

Couple	Judges' scores			Total score	Music	Public vote	Skate-off	Result
Couple	Gardiner	Cousins	Bunton	Total score	Music	Public vote	Skate-off	Result
Steven & Nina	2	3	2	7	"House of Fun" — Madness	7.8%		Safe
Angela & Sean	3	5	3	11	"At Last" — Etta James	3.2%	8.8%	Eliminated
Laura & Colin	4	6	6	16	"My Life Would Suck Without You" — Kelly Clarkson	7.0%	75.1%	Bottom three
Johnson & Jodeyne	2	5	4	11	"Wishing on a Star" — Paul Weller	28.3%		Safe
Nadia & Mark	3	3	3	9	"Proud Mary" — Tina Turner	4.9%	16.1%	Eliminated
Kerry & Daniel	4	5	5	14	"Make You Feel My Love" — Adele	29.8%		Safe
Jeff & Isabelle	3	4	4	11	"The Way Love Goes" — Lemar	9.0%		Safe
Vanilla Ice & Katie	5	5	5	15	"Word Up!" — Gun	10.1%		Safe

=== Qualifying round 2 (16 January) ===
Only eight couples skated this week, with six going through to qualify for the competition. Couples are listed in the order they performed.

Couple	Judges' scores			Total score	Music	Public vote	Skate-off	Result
Couple	Gardiner	Cousins	Bunton	Total score	Music	Public vote	Skate-off	Result
Craig & Maria	3	3	3	9	"Sympathy for the Devil" — The Rolling Stones	6.7%	24.3%	Eliminated
Jennifer & Sylvain	4	4	4	12	"Crazy for You" — Madonna	5.7%	70.4%	Bottom three
Comedy Dave & Frankie	3	4	4	11	"The Safety Dance" — Men Without Hats	13.1%		Safe
Elen & Łukasz	3	4	4	11	"Your Love Is King" — Sade	2.8%	5.3%	Eliminated
Dominic & Alexandra	3	5	3	11	"Are You Ready for Love" — Elton John	9.9%		Safe
Chloe & Michael	4	6	6	16	"Mama Do" — Pixie Lott	12.5%		Safe
Sam & Brianne	6	7	8	21	"Club Can't Handle Me" — Flo Rida & David Guetta	17.6%		Safe
Denise & Matt	3	4	3	10	"Pack Up" — Eliza Doolittle	31.7%		Safe

=== Week 1 (23 January) ===
Couples are listed in the order they performed.

Couple	Judges' scores			Total score	Music	Public vote	Points			Result
Couple	Gardiner	Cousins	Bunton	Total score	Music	Public vote	Judges	Public	Total	Result
Vanilla Ice & Katie	5.0	6.0	5.0	16.0	"Minnie The Moocher" — Big Bad Voodoo Daddy	4.1%	9	3	12	Safe
Chloe & Michael	5.5	7.0	6.5	19.0	"The Climb" — Miley Cyrus	7.1%	10	7	17	Safe
Denise & Matt	3.0	3.0	3.0	9.0	"Gimme! Gimme! Gimme!" — ABBA	11.4%	3	9	12	Safe
Dominic & Alexandra	3.0	4.5	4.0	11.5	"Feel" — Robbie Williams	2.4%	6	1	7	Bottom two
Laura & Colin	6.0	6.5	7.0	19.5	"All the Lovers" — Kylie Minogue	6.5%	11	5	16	Safe
Steven & Nina	2.0	2.5	2.5	7.0	"Rhythm of the Night" — DeBarge	4.3%	2	4	6	Eliminated
Jeff & Isabelle	3.0	4.0	4.0	11.0	"I Want You Back" — The Jackson 5	4.0%	5	2	7	Safe
Comedy Dave & Frankie	2.5	3.5	3.5	9.5	"The Way You Look Tonight" — Fred Astaire	10.0%	4	8	12	Safe
Jennifer & Sylvain	6.0	7.0	6.5	19.5	"California Gurls" — Katy Perry	6.9%	11	6	17	Safe
Sam & Brianne	8.0	8.5	8.5	25.0	"Stop and Stare" — OneRepublic	12.7%	12	10	22	Safe
Johnson & Jodeyne	4.0	4.5	4.5	13.0	"I'm into Something Good" — Herman's Hermits	17.8%	7	12	19	Safe
Kerry & Daniel	4.0	5.0	5.0	14.0	"Respect" — Aretha Franklin	13.0%	8	11	19	Safe

Judges' votes to save

- Gardiner: Dominic & Alexandra
- Bunton: Dominic & Alexandra
- Cousins: Did not vote, but would have voted to save Dominic & Alexandra

=== Week 2 (30 January) ===
Instead of the judges, the celebrities voted this week for which couple they wanted to save after the skate-off.

Couples are listed in the order they performed.

Couple	Judges' scores			Total score	Music	Public vote	Points			Result
Couple	Gardiner	Cousins	Bunton	Total score	Music	Public vote	Judges	Public	Total	Result
Chloe & Michael	6.5	6.5	6.5	19.5	"I Love Rock 'n' Roll" — Arrows	8.2%	9	6	15	Safe
Johnson & Jodeyne	4.0	4.5	4.5	13.0	"One Love" — Bob Marley	12.2%	6	8	14	Safe
Jeff & Isabelle	4.0	4.0	4.5	12.5	"Better Together" — Jack Johnson	6.1%	5	4	9	Bottom two
Kerry & Daniel	3.0	3.5	3.5	10.0	"Disturbia" — Rihanna	14.3%	3	11	14	Safe
Vanilla Ice & Katie	5.5	5.0	5.5	16.0	"Always" — Bon Jovi	5.7%	7	3	10	Safe
Dominic & Alexandra	3.0	4.5	3.5	11.0	"I Can See for Miles" — The Who	3.0%	4	1	5	Eliminated
Laura & Colin	7.5	6.0	6.5	20.0	"Whenever, Wherever" — Shakira	7.6%	10	5	15	Safe
Jennifer & Sylvain	5.5	7.0	6.0	18.5	"Anyone Who Had a Heart" — Cilla Black	5.2%	8	2	10	Safe
Denise & Matt	3.5	3.0	3.5	10.0	"Slow" — Rumer	11.8%	3	7	10	Safe
Sam & Brianne	8.5	8.5	8.0	25.0	"Crazy Little Thing Called Love" — Queen	13.0%	11	10	21	Safe
Comedy Dave & Frankie	3.0	4.0	4.0	11.0	"Achy Breaky Heart" — Billy Ray Cyrus	13.0%	4	9	13	Safe

Contestants' votes to save

- Madeley: Jeff & Isabelle
- Beharry: Dominic & Alexandra
- Katona: Jeff & Isabelle
- Vanilla Ice: Jeff & Isabelle
- Hamilton: Jeff & Isabelle
- Metcalfe: Jeff & Isabelle
- Welch: Dominic & Alexandra
- Attwater: Jeff & Isabelle
- Comedy Dave: Dominic & Alexandra

=== Week 3 (6 February) ===
Theme: Las Vegas Night
Required element: Step combination – Ultimate Skills Test

Couples are listed in the order they performed.

Couple	Judges' scores			Total score	Music	Public vote	Points			Result
Couple	Gardiner	Cousins	Bunton	Total score	Music	Public vote	Judges	Public	Total	Result
Jennifer & Sylvain	6.0	7.0	6.0	19.0	"If I Could Turn Back Time" — Cher	4.4%	6	1	7	Eliminated
Jeff & Isabelle	5.5	7.5	7.0	20.0	"It's Not Unusual" — Tom Jones	5.3%	7	3	10	Safe
Laura & Colin	8.5	8.0	7.5	24.0	"It's All Coming Back to Me Now" — Celine Dion	7.7%	9	4	13	Safe
Denise & Matt	4.5	4.5	4.5	13.5	"'S Wonderful" — Shirley Bassey	11.6%	4	9	13	Safe
Comedy Dave & Frankie	3.0	4.0	4.0	11.0	"Release Me" — Engelbert Humperdinck	11.0%	2	8	10	Safe
Vanilla Ice & Katie	5.5	5.0	5.5	16.0	"Blue Suede Shoes" — Elvis Presley	4.5%	5	2	7	Bottom two
Johnson & Jodeyne	4.0	4.0	4.0	12.0	"Piano Man" — Billy Joel	25.9%	3	10	13	Safe
Sam & Brianne	8.5	8.5	8.5	25.5	"I Get a Kick out of You" — Frank Sinatra	8.9%	10	5	15	Safe
Kerry & Daniel	3.0	3.5	3.5	10.0	"Woman in Love" — Barbra Streisand	10.3%	1	6	7	Safe
Chloe & Michael	7.0	7.5	7.5	22.0	"In the Mood" — Bette Midler	10.5%	8	7	15	Safe

Judges' votes to save

- Gardiner: Vanilla Ice & Katie
- Cousins: Vanilla Ice & Katie
- Bunton: Vanilla Ice & Katie

=== Week 4 (13 February) ===
Theme: A Night at the Theatre
Required element: Jump – Ultimate Skills Test

Couples are listed in the order they performed.

Couple	Judges' scores			Total score	Music	Musical	Public vote	Points			Result
Couple	Gardiner	Cousins	Bunton	Total score	Music	Musical	Public vote	Judges	Public	Total	Result
Jeff & Isabelle	6.5	8.0	7.5	22.0	"All I Ask of You"	The Phantom of the Opera	8.3%	8	2	10	Safe
Denise & Matt	4.0	4.5	4.5	13.0	"Roxie"	Chicago	10.5%	5	6	11	Safe
Sam & Brianne	8.5	8.5	8.5	25.5	"Flash Bang Wallop"	Half a Sixpence	10.7%	9	7	16	Safe
Kerry & Daniel	4.0	4.0	4.0	12.0	"There's No Business Like Show Business"	Annie Get Your Gun	8.3%	3	1	4	Bottom two
Chloe & Michael	6.5	8.0	7.5	22.0	"On My Own"	Les Misérables	9.4%	8	3	11	Safe
Johnson & Jodeyne	4.5	5.0	5.5	15.0	"Always Look on the Bright Side of Life"	Spamalot	15.9%	6	8	14	Safe
Vanilla Ice & Katie	6.5	8.0	6.5	21.0	"Born to Hand Jive"	Grease	10.5%	7	5	12	Safe
Comedy Dave & Frankie	4.0	4.5	4.0	12.5	"Aquarius"	Hair	10.4%	4	4	8	Eliminated
Laura & Colin	8.5	8.5	8.5	25.5	"You Can't Stop the Beat"	Hairspray	16.0%	9	9	18	Safe

Judges' votes to save

- Bunton: Kerry & Daniel
- Cousins: Comedy Dave & Frankie
- Gardiner: Kerry & Daniel

=== Week 5 (20 February) ===
Required element: Step combination, jump & spin – Ultimate Skills Test

Couples are listed in the order they performed.

Couple	Judges' scores			Total score	Music	Public vote	Points			Result
Couple	Gardiner	Cousins	Bunton	Total score	Music	Public vote	Judges	Public	Total	Result
Chloe & Michael	5.5	5.5	7.5	18.5	"Little Bird" — Annie Lennox	8.6%	5	3	8	Safe
Johnson & Jodeyne	4.5	5.0	5.0	14.5	"She Will Be Loved" — Maroon 5	20.9%	2	8	10	safe
Laura & Colin	8.5	8.5	8.5	25.5	"Stop!" — Sam Brown	10.9%	8	4	12	Safe
Jeff & Isabelle	5.5	5.5	5.0	16.0	"Forget You" — Cee Lo Green	7.1%	3	1	4	Bottom two
Denise & Matt	5.5	5.5	5.5	16.5	"True Colors" — Cyndi Lauper	13.5%	4	6	10	Safe
Sam & Brianne	7.5	8.5	8.5	24.5	"She Said" — Plan B	11.0%	7	5	12	Safe
Kerry & Daniel	2.5	3.0	3.5	9.0	"Hush Hush; Hush Hush" — The Pussycat Dolls	8.3%	1	2	3	Eliminated
Vanilla Ice & Katie	7.5	7.5	7.5	22.5	"Ice Ice Baby" — Vanilla Ice	19.8%	6	7	13	Safe

Judges' votes to save

- Bunton: Jeff & Isabelle
- Cousins: Jeff & Isabelle
- Gardiner: Jeff & Isabelle

=== Week 6 (27 February) ===
Theme: International dances

As Holly Willoughby fell ill this week, Coleen Nolan replaced her as host. Couples are listed in the order they performed.

Couple	Judges' scores			Total score	Music	Public vote	Points			Result
Couple	Gardiner	Cousins	Bunton	Total score	Music	Public vote	Judges	Public	Total	Result
Laura & Colin	8.0	8.0	8.5	24.5	"Upside Down" — Paloma Faith	9.3%	6	1	7	Bottom two
Jeff & Isabelle	7.0	7.5	8.0	22.5	"When I Need You" — Leo Sayer	12.1%	5	3	8	Safe
Denise & Matt	4.5	5.0	5.0	14.5	"Let's Get Loud" — Jennifer Lopez	12.1%	3	4	7	Safe
Vanilla Ice & Katie	7.0	7.0	7.5	21.5	"Like I Love You" — Justin Timberlake	10.3%	4	2	6	Eliminated
Sam & Brianne	9.0	9.0	9.0	27.0	"Riverdance" — from Riverdance	14.7%	7	6	13	Safe
Chloe & Michael	7.5	8.5	8.5	24.5	"Kiss Kiss" — Holly Valance	13.4%	6	5	11	Safe
Johnson & Jodeyne	4.5	5.0	5.0	14.5	"She Drives Me Crazy" — Fine Young Cannibals	28.1%	3	7	10	Safe

Judges' votes to save

- Cousins: Laura & Colin
- Bunton: Laura & Colin
- Gardiner: Laura & Colin

=== Week 7 (6 March) ===
After their individual performances, the couples were divided into two teams for a group performance. The couples on the winning team, as determined by the judges, had their final scores doubled. Couples are listed in the order they performed.

- Team Sam (Sam & Brianne; Chloe & Michael; and Johnson & Jodeyne): "I Don't Feel Like Dancin'" — Scissor Sisters
- Team Laura (Laura & Colin; Denise & Matt; and Jeff & Isabelle): "Rockin' All Over the World" — Status Quo

Couple	Judges' scores			Total score	Team skate	Final score	Music	Public vote	Points			Result
Couple	Gardiner	Cousins	Bunton	Total score	Team skate	Final score	Music	Public vote	Judges	Public	Total	Result
Denise & Matt	5.0	5.0	5.0	15.0	Won	30.0	"Alone" — Heart	6.8%	4	1	5	Eliminated
Jeff & Isabelle	7.0	7.5	8.0	22.5	Won	45.0	"Hit the Road Jack" — Ray Charles	7.5%	5	2	7	Safe
Sam & Brianne	8.5	8.5	8.5	25.5	Lost	25.5	"Crazy Love" — Michael Bublé	24.3%	2	5	7	Safe
Chloe & Michael	8.5	9.0	9.0	26.5	Lost	26.5	"Empire State of Mind (Part II) Broken Down" — Alicia Keys	19.6%	3	4	7	Safe
Johnson & Jodeyne	5.5	6.0	6.0	17.5	Lost	17.5	"You Are So Beautiful" — Joe Cocker	17.4%	1	3	4	Bottom two
Laura & Colin	9.5	9.5	9.5	28.5	Won	57.0	"I'm So Excited" — The Pointer Sisters	24.4%	6	6	12	Safe

Judges' votes for team challenge

- Gardiner: Team Laura
- Cousins: Team Sam
- Bunton: Team Laura

Judges votes to save

- Bunton: Johnson & Jodeyne
- Cousins: Johnson & Jodeyne
- Gardiner: Johnson & Jodeyne

=== Week 8 (13 March) ===
Required element: Skating with a prop

Couples are listed in the order they performed.

Couple	Judges' scores			Total score	Music	Prop	Public vote	Points			Result
Couple	Gardiner	Cousins	Bunton	Total score	Music	Prop	Public vote	Judges	Public	Total	Result
Sam & Brianne	8.0	8.0	8.5	24.5	"Beggin'" — Madcon	Microphone stand & hat	16.6	3	2	5	Bottom two
Johnson & Jodeyne	6.5	7.0	6.0	19.5	"Goodnite, Sweetheart, Goodnite" — The Spaniels	Umbrella & hat	19.8	1	4	5	Safe
Laura & Colin	8.5	8.5	8.5	25.5	"Rolling in the Deep" — Adele	Cane & chair	17.4	4	3	7	Safe
Jeff & Isabelle	6.5	7.5	7.5	21.5	"We Can Work It Out" — Sweetbox	Table & chairs	10.6	2	1	3	Eliminated
Chloe & Michael	9.0	9.0	9.0	27.0	"Only Girl (In the World)" — Rihanna	Skipping rope & hula hoop	35.6	5	5	10	Safe

Judges' votes to save

- Cousins: Sam & Brianne
- Gardiner: Sam & Brianne
- Bunton: Sam & Brianne

=== Week 9 (20 March) ===
Required element: Solo challenge

Couples are listed in the order they performed.

Couple	Judges' scores			Total score	Music	Public vote	Points			Result
Couple	Gardiner	Cousins	Bunton	Total score	Music	Public vote	Judges	Public	Total	Result
Chloe & Michael	7.0	7.0	7.0	41.0	"Firework" — Katy Perry	25.9	2	2	4	Bottom two
Chloe	6.5	7.0	6.5	41.0	"That's Not My Name" — The Ting Tings	25.9	2	2	4	Bottom two
Johnson & Jodeyne	6.0	6.0	6.5	34.0	"L.I.F.E.G.O.E.S.O.N." — Noah and the Whale	13.3	1	1	2	Eliminated
Johnson	4.5	5.0	6.0	34.0	"Don't Worry Be Happy" — Bobby McFerrin	13.3	1	1	2	Eliminated
Laura & Colin	9.5	9.0	9.5	54.5	"The Last Dance" — Clare Maguire	29.8	3	3	6	Safe
Laura	8.5	9.0	9.0	54.5	"These Boots Are Made for Walkin'" — Jessica Simpson	29.8	3	3	6	Safe
Sam & Brianne	9.5	9.5	9.0	55.5	"Don't Stop the Music" — Jamie Cullum	31.0	4	4	8	Safe
Sam	9.0	9.5	9.0	55.5	"Superstition" — Stevie Wonder	31.0	4	4	8	Safe

Judges' votes to save

- Cousins: Chloe & Michael
- Gardiner: Chloe & Michael
- Bunton: Chloe & Michael

=== Week 10: Finale (27 March) ===
Each couple performed two routines, one of which was their favourite routine of the series. One couple was eliminated and the final two couples performed the Boléro. Couples are listed in the order they performed.

Couple	Judges' scores			Total score	Music	Public vote	Boléro	Result
Couple	Gardiner	Cousins	Bunton	Total score	Music	Public vote	Boléro	Result
Sam & Brianne	9.5	10.0	10.0	58.0	"Footloose" — from Footloose	42.1%	63.2%	Winners
Sam & Brianne	9.5	9.5	9.5	58.0	"Riverdance" — from Riverdance	42.1%	63.2%	Winners
Laura & Colin	8.5	8.5	9.0	56.0	"Express Yourself" — Madonna	31.6%	36.8%	Runners-up
Laura & Colin	10.0	10.0	10.0	56.0	"I'm So Excited" — Pointer Sisters	31.6%	36.8%	Runners-up
Chloe & Michael	8.5	8.0	9.0	54.0	"(I've Had) The Time of My Life" — from Dirty Dancing	26.3%	—N/a	Third place
Chloe & Michael	9.5	9.5	9.5	54.0	"Kiss Kiss" — Holly Valance	26.3%	—N/a	Third place

== Ratings ==
Viewing figures from BARB.

Episode	Date	Official ITV rating (millions)	Weekly rank	Share	Official ITV HD rating (millions)	Total ITV viewers (millions)
Qualifying 1	9 January	9.37	6	34.0%	0.86	10.23
Qualifying Results 1	9 January	7.56	14	28.8%	0.53	8.09
Qualifying 2	16 January	8.83	7	33.8%	0.72	9.55
Qualifying Results 2	16 January	7.50	14	29.8%	0.57	8.07
Live show 1	23 January	8.19	8	30.3%	0.66	8.85
Results 1	23 January	6.93	14	25.6%	0.54	7.47
Live show 2	30 January	8.06	7	30.2%	0.68	8.74
Results 2	30 January	7.33	14	27.8%	0.59	7.92
Live show 3	6 February	8.13	5	30.8%	0.72	8.85
Results 3	6 February	7.29	15	28.0%	0.65	7.94
Live show 4	13 February	8.60	6	32.1%	0.68	9.28
Results 4	13 February	7.26	13	27.4%	0.53	7.79
Live show 5	20 February	8.04	11	30.9%	0.72	8.76
Results 5	20 February	6.83	14	24.6%	0.48	7.31
Live show 6	27 February	7.83	10	30.0%	0.60	8.43
Results 6	27 February	6.25	16	24.2%	0.51	6.76
Live show 7	6 March	8.34	6	33.6%	0.69	9.03
Results 7	6 March	6.93	14	26.6%	0.58	7.51
Live show 8	13 March	7.95	6	30.6%	0.65	8.60
Results 8	13 March	6.90	14	26.6%	0.45	7.35
Live show 9	20 March	8.34	3	32.3%	0.61	8.95
Results 9	20 March	6.50	12	23.8%	0.37	6.87
Live final	27 March	8.54	5	33.2%	0.81	9.35
