= Michael Zenezini =

French ice dancer

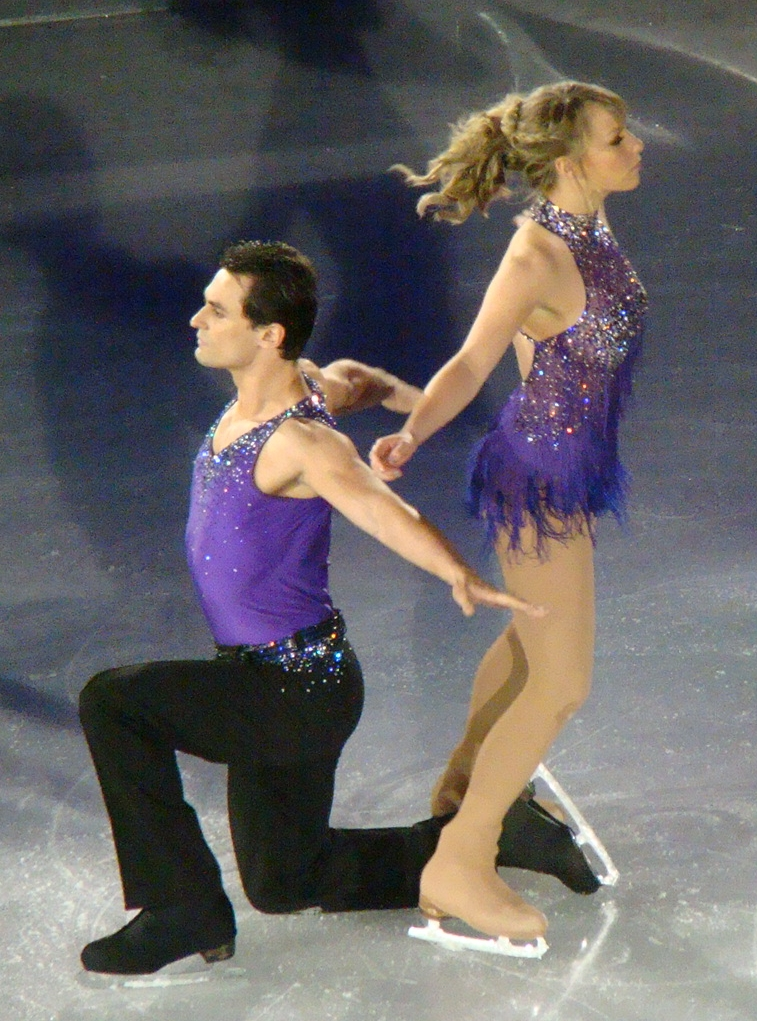
- Zenezini and Chloe Madeley on the Dancing on Ice tour in 2011

Personal information
- Born: 30 September 1980 (age 45) Lyon, France

Figure skating career
- Country: France
- Retired: 2002

Michael Zenezini (30 September 1980) is a French ice dancer. With Melanie Espejo, he placed fifth at the 1998 World Junior Championships. In 2011, he performed on Dancing on Ice with Chloe Madeley.

== Skating career ==
=== Competitive ===
Zenezini grew up in Lyon and began skating at the age of eight. He competed in ice dancing and won the French junior title with Melanie Espejo. They were assigned to the 1997 World Junior Championships in Seoul, South Korea and finished ninth. The following season, they placed fifth at the 1998 World Junior Championships in Saint John, New Brunswick, Canada. Zenezini also competed briefly with Nathalie Péchalat and Véronique Delobel. He retired from competition in 2002.

International
Event	1996–1997 (with Espejo)	1997–1998 (with Espejo)	1999–2000 (with Péchalat)	2001–2002 (with Delobel)
World Junior Champ.	9th	5th		
JGP Germany		4th		
JGP Hungary		4th		
JGP Norway			6th	
Blue Swords	4th J.			
St. Gervais	3rd			
EYOF	2nd J.			
National
French Champ.	1st J.			4th
JGP = Junior Grand Prix (earlier Junior Series)

=== Ice shows ===
Zenezini later appeared in ice shows. He spent six years with Holiday on Ice and then skated in Hot Ice. His partners included Lindsey Woolstencroft, Carole Azario, and Suzanna Dagger.

In 2011, Zenezini joined the British ITV skating competition Dancing on Ice as a professional skater. He was paired with Chloe Madeley for the sixth series, and later returned for the eighth series in 2013, where he was paired with Lauren Goodger.

== Personal life ==
Zenezini lives near Cannes with his wife, Barbara Maros, a Hungarian skater.
