= Dominic Parker =

British Reality Star

- Born: July 1964 (age 61); Kent, England
- Occupation(s): B&B co-owner, TV personality
- Television: Gogglebox; The Jump; Hunted; Celebrity Masterchef
- Spouse: Stephanie Parker (m. 1998)
- Children: 2

Dominic Parker (born July 1964), from Westbere, is an English television personality who lived in Sandwich, Kent. He used to own a Grade I listed house in Kent, The Salutation, designed by Edwin Lutyens. Dom and Steph ran it as a bed and breakfast, and it featured in Channel 4's Four in a Bed. He attended Downside School.

He was a cast member on Gogglebox with his wife Stephanie from 2013 to 2016, and in 2023, for the show’s 10th anniversary special.

He also participated in the second series of The Jump as 'The Arctic Fox'. He suffered concussion while filming The Jump. He participated on the Channel 4 'catch me if you can'-style show Hunted with his wife, Stephanie. In 2019, Parker appeared as a contestant in Celebrity Masterchef.

== 2020s ==
The Salutation went into liquidation in 2021. Speaking about the liquidation, Dom said that he wanted to sell the estate anyway as he and his wife Steph "don't have the energy to run it any more". Steph and Dom now reside in the Canary Islands.

== Books ==
- Parker, Steph; Parker, Dom (24 September 2015). Steph and Dom's Guide to Life: How to get the most out of pretty much everything life throws at you. Hodder & Stoughton. ISBN 978-1-4736-2062-9.
