= The Jump series 2 =

The Jump
- Season 2
- Winner: Joey Essex
- No. of episodes: 8

Release
- Original network: Channel 4
- Original release: 1 February – 9 February 2015

Series chronology
- ← Previous; Series 1 Next → Series 3

The Jump returned for a second series on 1 February 2015. The series was once again hosted by Davina McCall and broadcast live from Austria on Channel 4. On 20 January 2015, it was announced that a new show would air over on sister channel E4 called On the Piste from 2 February, and would be presented by Cherry Healey.

== Contestants ==
The sixteen original celebrities taking part were revealed on 10 December 2014. On 13 December, it was announced that Ola Jordan had to pull out of the competition due to injury. At the time, it was not known whether she would be replaced; however, on 4 January 2015, it was revealed that Chloe Madeley would replace her. On 9 January it was announced that Sally Bercow had to pull out of the competition due to injury; she was replaced by Jodie Kidd.

Celebrity	Known for	Status
Phil Tufnell	England cricketer	Eliminated 1st on 1 February 2015
Dominic Parker	Gogglebox star	Eliminated 2nd on 1 February 2015
Heather Mills	Media personality & businesswoman	Eliminated 3rd on 2 February 2015
Ashley Roberts	Former The Pussycat Dolls singer	Eliminated 4th on 2 February 2015
Louie Spence	Dance expert & choreographer	Eliminated 5th on 3 February 2015
Jodie Kidd	Former model & television presenter	Eliminated 6th on 3 February 2015
Stacey Solomon	Former The X Factor finalist	Eliminated 7th on 4 February 2015
Lady Victoria Hervey	Model & socialite	Eliminated 8th on 5 February 2015
Steve-O	Jackass star & comedian	Eliminated 9th on 6 February 2015
JB Gill	Former JLS singer	Eliminated 10th on 8 February 2015
Jon-Allan Butterworth	Paralympic track cyclist	Eliminated 11th on 9 February 2015
Chloe Madeley	Freelance journalist & model	Eliminated 12th on 9 February 2015
Louise Thompson	Made in Chelsea star	Eliminated 13th on 9 February 2015
Louise Hazel	Olympic heptathlete	Third place on 9 February 2015
Mike Tindall	Former England rugby player	Runner-up on 9 February 2015
Joey Essex	Former The Only Way is Essex star	Winner on 9 February 2015

== Live shows ==
The series began on 1 February 2015, running for eight days until the final on 9 February (with no show on 7 February). During the live ski jump, the celebrities were given the option of three jumps – K15 (small), K24 (medium) or K40 (the largest). The celebrity that jumped the shortest distance was eliminated. For shows three and eight, which were broadcast live from Kühtai, a brand new eliminator called the "Air Jump" was introduced: the celebrities jumped off a 4 1/2-metre kicker and landed safely in a giant airbag. The celebrity or celebrities that jumped the highest stayed in the competition, while whoever jumped the lowest was eliminated.

=== Results summary ===
Colour key

–	Celebrity did not take part in this event
–	Celebrity recorded the slowest time/speed in that event and had to perform a live ski/air jump
–	Celebrity recorded the fastest time/speed in each event

Daily results per celebrity
Celebrity	Day 1	Day 2	Day 3	Day 4	Day 5	Day 6		Day 7	Day 8				Number of events
Celebrity	Day 1	Day 2	Day 3	Day 4	Day 5	Race 1	Race 2	Day 7	Race 1	Race 2	Final		Number of events
Celebrity	Day 1	Day 2	Day 3	Day 4	Day 5	Race 1	Race 2	Day 7	Race 1	Race 2	Jump 1	Jump 2	Number of events
Joey	3rd 44.53	—	2nd	8th 19.75	5th 55.95	1st	—	2nd 40.17	6th DNF	2nd 27.04	15.5m	Winner; 17.5m	7
Mike	8th 46.08	—	1st	1st 16.90	2nd 55.28	1st	—	—	1st 23.56	—	16.5m	Runner-up; 17.0m	6
Louise H	—	1st 43.50	3rd	4th 18.01	4th 55.89	2nd	—	4th 51.33	3rd 27.90	—	16.5m	3rd 17.0m	7
Louise T	—	7th 45.07	1st	2nd 16.93	7th 56.84	DNF	1st	5th 71.96	2nd 24.90	1st 24.43	15.0m	Eliminated (Day 8)	7
Chloe	—	2nd 44.27	1st	9th 19.86	6th 56.03	4th	2nd	6th 73.62	5th 32.10	4th 29.50	Eliminated (Day 8)		7
Jon-Allan	2nd 43.62	—	2nd	7th 19.48	8th 56.85	3rd	4th	1st 35.86	4th 28.92	3rd 27.41	Eliminated (Day 8)		7
JB	7th 45.65	—	3rd	3rd 17.88	1st 55.13	2nd	—	3rd 45.15	Eliminated (Day 7)				6
Steve-O	1st 43.15	—	1st	6th 18.57	3rd 55.88	3rd	3rd	Eliminated (Day 6)					5
Lady Victoria	—	4th 44.53	2nd	5th 18.15	9th N/A	Eliminated (Day 5)							4
Stacey	—	6th 45.03	2nd	10th 20.48	Eliminated (Day 4)								3
Jodie	—	3rd 44.50	3rd	Eliminated (Day 3)									2
Louie	5th 44.79	—	3rd	Eliminated (Day 3)									2
Ashley	—	8th 47.75	Eliminated (Day 2)										1
Heather	—	5th 44.81	Eliminated (Day 2)										1
Dom	6th 44.83	Eliminated (Day 1)											1
Phil	4th 44.58	Eliminated (Day 1)											1
Live ski/air jump	Gill, Parker, Tindall, Tufnell	Hervey, Mills, Roberts, Thompson	Gill, Hazel, Kidd, Spence	Hazel, Madeley, Solomon, Steve-O, Thompson	Butterworth, Hervey, Madeley, Thompson, Tindall	None	Butterworth, Madeley, Steve-O	Gill, Madeley, Thompson	None	Butterworth, Essex, Madeley	None		
Eliminated	Phil Tufnell; K15; 9.0m	Heather Mills; K24; 12.0m	Louie Spence; 6.44m	Stacey Solomon; K24; 13.5m	Lady Victoria Hervey; K24; 13.5m	None	Steve-O; 6.57m	JB Gill; K24; 13.5m	None	Jon-Allan Butterworth; 6.30m	Louise Thompson; K24; 15.0m	Louise Hazel; K40; 17.0m	
Eliminated	Dom Parker; K15; 9.0m	Ashley Roberts; K24; 13.0m	Jodie Kidd; 6.71m	Stacey Solomon; K24; 13.5m	Lady Victoria Hervey; K24; 13.5m	None	Steve-O; 6.57m	JB Gill; K24; 13.5m	None	Chloe Madeley; 6.73m	Louise Thompson; K24; 15.0m	Mike Tindall; K24; 17.0m	
Reference(s)						None			None				

=== Episode details ===
==== Episode 1 (1 February) ====
- Event: Men's skeleton
- Location: Igls Sliding Centre

Race	Celebrity	Time (seconds)	Overall leaderboard	Result
1	Louie Spence	44.79	5th	Safe
1	Mike Tindall	46.08	8th	Bottom two
2	Joey Essex	44.53	3rd	Safe
2	Phil Tufnell	44.58	4th	Bottom two
3	JB Gill	45.65	7th	Bottom two
3	Jon-Allan Butterworth	43.62	2nd	Safe
4	Dom Parker	44.83	6th	Bottom two
4	Steve-O	43.15	1st	Safe

Live ski jump details

Order	Celebrity	Type	Distance (meters)	Result
1	Mike Tindall	K24	18.0	Safe
1	Phil Tufnell	K15	9.0	Eliminated
2	JB Gill	K24	14.5	Safe
2	Dom Parker	K15	9.0	Eliminated

==== Episode 2 (2 February) ====
- Event: Women's skeleton
- Location: Igls Sliding Centre

Race	Celebrity	Time (seconds)	Overall leaderboard	Result
1	Louise Hazel	43.50	1st	Safe
1	Heather Mills	44.81	5th	Bottom two
2	Lady Victoria Hervey	44.53	4th	Bottom two
2	Jodie Kidd	44.50	3rd	Safe
3	Ashley Roberts	47.75	8th	Bottom two
3	Stacey Solomon	45.03	6th	Safe
4	Louise Thompson	45.07	7th	Bottom two
4	Chloe Madeley	44.27	2nd	Safe

Live ski jump details

Order	Celebrity	Type	Distance (meters)	Result
1	Heather Mills	K24	12.0	Eliminated
1	Lady Victoria Hervey	K24	12.5	Safe
2	Ashley Roberts	K24	13.0	Eliminated
2	Louise Thompson	K24	15.5	Safe

==== Episode 3 (3 February) ====
- Event: Snow cross
- Location: Kühtai Saddle

Race	Celebrity	Leaderboard	Result
1	Mike Tindall	1st	Safe
1	Joey Essex	2nd	Safe
1	Louie Spence	3rd	Bottom two
2	Chloe Madeley	1st	Safe
2	Stacey Solomon	2nd	Safe
2	Louise Hazel	3rd	Bottom two
3	Steve-O	1st	Safe
3	Jon-Allan Butterworth	2nd	Safe
3	JB Gill	3rd	Bottom two
4	Louise Thompson	1st	Safe
4	Lady Victoria Hervey	2nd	Safe
4	Jodie Kidd	3rd	Bottom two

Live air jump details

Order	Celebrity	Height (meters)	Result
1	Louie Spence	6.44	Eliminated
1	JB Gill	6.48	Safe
2	Louise Hazel	6.83	Safe
2	Jodie Kidd	6.71	Eliminated

==== Episode 4 (4 February) ====
- Event: Parallel slalom
- Location: Kühtai Saddle

Race	Celebrity	Time (seconds)	Overall leaderboard	Result
1	Louise Thompson	16.93	2nd	Bottom five
1	Mike Tindall	16.90	1st	Safe
2	Stacey Solomon	20.48	10th	Bottom five
2	Jon-Allan Butterworth	19.74	7th	Safe
3	Chloe Madeley	19.86	9th	Bottom five
3	Joey Essex	19.75	8th	Safe
4	Lady Victoria Hervey	18.15	5th	Safe
4	Steve-O	18.67	6th	Bottom five
5	Louise Hazel	18.01	4th	Bottom five
5	JB Gill	17.88	3rd	Safe

Live ski jump details

Order	Celebrity	Type	Distance (meters)	Result
1	Louise Thompson	K24	16.0	Safe
2	Stacey Solomon	K24	13.5	Eliminated
3	Chloe Madeley	K24	16.0	Safe
4	Steve-O	K24	17.0	Safe
5	Louise Hazel	K24	15.0	Safe

==== Episode 5 (5 February) ====
- Event: Bobsleigh
- Location: Igls Sliding Centre

Race	Celebrity	Time (seconds)	Overall leaderboard	Result
N/A	Lady Victoria Hervey	—	9th	Bottom five
1	Joey Essex	55.95	5th	Safe
1	Louise Thompson	56.84	7th	Bottom five
2	Louise Hazel	55.89	4th	Safe
2	Jon-Allan Butterworth	56.85	8th	Bottom five
3	Steve-O	55.88	3rd	Safe
3	Chloe Madeley	56.03	6th	Bottom five
4	Mike Tindall	55.28	2nd	Bottom five
4	JB Gill	55.13	1st	Safe

Live ski jump details

Order	Celebrity	Type	Distance (meters)	Result
1	Lady Victoria Hervey	K24	13.5	Eliminated
2	Louise Thompson	K24	15.5	Safe
3	Jon-Allan Butterworth	K24	13.5	Safe
4	Chloe Madeley	K24	14.5	Safe
5	Mike Tindall	K24	17.0	Safe

==== Episode 6 (6 February) ====
- Event: Ski cross
- Location: Kühtai Saddle

There were two races of four celebrities. The top two in each race qualified for the next show. The bottom two in each race had to race one final time, from which the bottom three went on to face the jump.

Race	Celebrity	Leaderboard	Result
1	Mike Tindall	1st	Safe
1	JB Gill	2nd	Safe
1	Steve-O	3rd	In Race 3
1	Louise Thompson	DNF	In Race 3
2	Joey Essex	1st	Safe
2	Louise Hazel	2nd	Safe
2	Jon-Allan Butterworth	3rd	In Race 3
2	Chloe Madeley	4th	In Race 3
3	Louise Thompson	1st	Safe
3	Chloe Madeley	2nd	Bottom three
3	Steve-O	3rd	Bottom three
3	Jon-Allan Butterworth	4th	Bottom three

Live air jump details

Order	Celebrity	Height (meters)	Result
1	Chloe Madeley	6.66	Safe
2	Steve-O	6.57	Eliminated
3	Jon-Allan Butterworth	6.60	Safe

==== Episode 7: Semi-final (8 February) ====
- Event: Banked slalom snowboarding
- Location: Kühtai Saddle

Race	Celebrity	Time (seconds)	Overall leaderboard	Result
N/A	Mike Tindall	—	—	—
1	Joey Essex	40.17	2nd	Safe
1	Louise Thompson	71.96	5th	Bottom three
2	Jon-Allan Butterworth	35.86	1st	Safe
2	JB Gill	45.15	3rd	Bottom three
3	Louise Hazel	51.33	4th	Safe
3	Chloe Madeley	73.62	6th	Bottom three

Live ski jump details

Order	Celebrity	Type	Distance (meters)	Result
1	Louise Thompson	K24	14.5	Safe
1	Louise Thompson	K24	17.0	Safe
2	JB Gill	K24	14.5	Eliminated
2	JB Gill	K24	13.5	Eliminated
3	Chloe Madeley	K24	15.0	Safe
3	Chloe Madeley	—	—	Safe

==== Episode 8: Final (9 February) ====
- Event: Ski cross
- Location: Kühtai Saddle

Race	Celebrity	Time (seconds)	Overall leaderboard	Result
1	Mike Tindall	23.56	1st	Safe
1	Louise Thompson	24.90	2nd	In Race 3
1	Joey Essex	DNF	6th	In Race 3
2	Louise Hazel	27.90	3rd	Safe
2	Jon-Allan Butterworth	28.92	4th	In Race 3
2	Chloe Madeley	32.10	5th	In Race 3
3	Louise Thompson	24.43	1st	Safe
3	Joey Essex	27.04	2nd	Bottom three
3	Jon-Allan Butterworth	27.41	3rd	Bottom three
3	Chloe Madeley	29.50	4th	Bottom three

Live air jump details

Order	Celebrity	Height (meters)	Result
1	Jon-Allan Butterworth	6.30	Eliminated
2	Chloe Madeley	6.73	Eliminated
3	Joey Essex	6.91	Safe

Live ski jump details (Round 1)

Order	Celebrity	Type	Distance (meters)	Result
1	Mike Tindall	K24	16.5	Safe
2	Louise Hazel	K24	16.5	Safe
3	Louise Thompson	K24	15.0	Eliminated
4	Joey Essex	K24	15.5	Safe

Live ski jump details (Round 2)

Order	Celebrity	Type	Distance (meters)	Result
1	Louise Hazel	K40	17.0	Third place
2	Joey Essex	K24	17.5	Winner
3	Mike Tindall	K24	17.0	Runner-up

== Ratings ==
Official ratings are taken from BARB, but do not include Channel 4 +1.

Episode	Air date	Official rating (millions)
1	1 February	2.85
2	2 February	2.03
3	3 February	2.15
4	4 February	2.15
5	5 February	1.84
6	6 February	1.77
7	8 February	2.17
8	9 February	2.06
