= Jonas Prising =

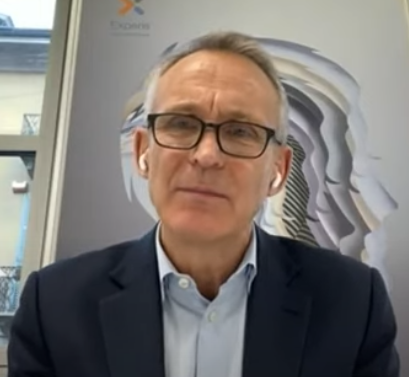
- Prising speaking at the 2022 World Economic Forum
- Born: 1967 (age 58–59); Sweden
- Citizenship: American and Swedish
- Education: Stockholm School of Economics
- Occupation: Business executive
- Spouse: Stephanie Prising
- Children: 3

Jonas Prising (born 1967) is a Swedish American business executive that works in the personnel industry. He became the chief executive officer of ManpowerGroup in 2014 after having been with the group since 1999.

== Early life and education ==
Prising was born in Sweden and obtained the equivalent of an MBA from the Stockholm School of Economics.

== Career ==
Prising was executive VP at Experis US, Inc. and held a range of key roles at Electrolux.

He joined ManpowerGroup in 1999 and became president of United States and Canadian Operations of Manpower Inc., the Executive VP of US and Canadian Operations, Managing Director of Manpower Italy of Manpower Inc., Director of Manpower Global Accounts of EMEA, President of North America and President of the Americas at Manpower Inc.

Prior to his leadership role at ManpowerGroup, Prising held other key executive roles at the firm. This includes: President of The Americas Operations at Manpower Inc. and three years earlier its Executive Vice President.

Prising became chief executive officer of ManpowerGroup Inc. in 2014, giving him responsibility for ManpowerGroup's $20 billion global operations. He was the fourth CEO the company had in its 68-year history up to that point.

== Other positions and events ==
Prising serves on the JA Worldwide, JA USA and JA of Wisconsin Inc., boards. He is co-chair of MiKE.

Over the years Prising has participated in various executive events. This includes such programs at INSEAD, Stanford and Yale, as well as the World Economic Forum annual and regional meetings. He also often speaks at various conferences and summits internationally. He offers insights into work trends for the media.

== Personal life ==
Prising speaks five languages: English, French, German, Italian and Swedish. He has lived in nine countries spanning the Asia, Europe and North American regions. Prising is married to Stephanie, whom he met while working in Singapore and they have three children. Two of their children were born in the UK.

As of 2024, he lives with his family in the Milwaukee area. He takes part in an amateur ice hockey league. He has both American and Swedish citizenship. He was described by outgoing President and CEO Jeffrey Joerres as being "absolutely ready" to take on the role of heading the company and that he is a "true global citizen." He believes that Prising's knowledge of France is extremely useful for the firm as it is their single biggest market.

One of his claims to fame is that out of all active Fortune 500 CEOs, Prising has been on Twitter the longest, by 2014 that was 2,145 days.
