= Margery Hurst =

- Born: Margery Berney; 23 May 1913; Portsmouth, England (probable)
- Died: 11 February 1989 (aged 75)
- Education: Brondesbury and Kilburn High School
- Alma mater: Royal Academy of Dramatic Art
- Occupation: businesswoman
- Known for: founder of Brook Street Bureau
- Spouse: Eric Hurst

Margery Hurst OBE (née Berney; 23 May 1913 – 11 February 1989), was a British businesswoman, and the founder of the recruitment agency Brook Street Bureau, which when it went public in 1965, was the world's largest office employment agency.

== Early life ==
She was born Margery Berney on 23 May 1913, probably in Portsmouth, the second of four daughters of Samuel Berney, a cinema owner and builder, of Portsmouth, and his wife Deborah Berney, née Rose. Her grandparents on both sides of the family were Russian Jewish immigrants.

She was educated at Brondesbury and Kilburn High School, London, followed by the Royal Academy of Dramatic Art (RADA).

== Career ==
She started acting while still a RADA student, two nights a week with the repertory company at Collins's Music Hall, which her father had just bought.

In 1946, she founded Brook Street Bureau and was its managing director.

In a 1965 report in Time magazine, shortly before the company went public in an initial public offering (IPO) on the London Stock Exchange, Hurst was described as one of Britain's richest women, and the head of the UK's largest secretarial employment agency, and was quoted as saying, "I never thought for a moment that I could fail".

In 1965, Brook Street Bureau was actually the world's largest office employment agency. For the flotation, she was persuaded that it would not be possible to have a woman as chairman of a public company, so she reluctantly agreed to stay on as managing director, with her husband as chairman. Within 15 months of the floatation, the share price had doubled.

== Personal life ==
On 26 September 1948, she married her second husband, Eric Kenneth Isaac Hurst (born 1913/14), a barrister who would become her business partner, and the son of Wilfred Hurst, a cotton merchant. They had a daughter together, but were later divorced.

== Later life ==
In her later years, Hurst had "a series of mental breakdowns", and died on 11 February 1989 at her home in London's Eaton Square.
