= Elmer Winter =

American lawyer

Elmer Louis Winter (March 6, 1912 – October 22, 2009) was an American lawyer who co-founded the Manpower Inc. temporary employment agency in 1948, after his law firm encountered difficulties hiring secretarial assistance in an emergency. By the time of his death, the firm was the world's third-largest temporary staffing firm, with 400,000 clients served by 4,100 offices in 82 countries.

== Early life and education ==
Winter was born on March 6, 1912, in Milwaukee, Wisconsin, where his immigrant father owned a clothing store. There he attended the local public schools, and graduated from Riverside High School in 1929. He earned a degree in economics from the University of Wisconsin–Madison and his law degree from the University of Wisconsin Law School.

== Manpower ==
Aaron Scheinfeld, owner of a Chicago law firm, hired Winter in 1936 and Winter moved back to Milwaukee when the firm opened a new branch there. Unable to find a secretary available to type up a last-minute brief that had to be filed with the Wisconsin Supreme Court in April 1948, the two attorneys were only able to finish the work with the assistance of a former employee who worked all night typing. This experience led them to consider that there might be a business opportunity in providing temporary services to businesses that needed assistance.

Despite the fact that almost all of their initial temps were women, they chose the name Manpower at the suggestion of a friend. They rented a Milwaukee storefront, offering bookkeepers, stenographers and typists to businesses as a sideline venture from their law firm. Though their first year was unprofitable, they were able to start making money in 1949. Manpower offered courses to help workers improve their skills on new technology and was the first to offer temporary staffing for industrial positions.

Winter retired from the firm in 1976, but maintained an office at the company's headquarters where served as chairman of the firm's advisory council. He regularly drove into the office until three weeks before his death, where a sign on his desk read "Hang in there, Elmer".

== Other work ==
Winter was national president of the American Jewish Committee in 1973–1977.

== Death ==
A resident of Fox Point, Wisconsin, Winter died at age 97 on October 22, 2009, in Mequon, Wisconsin. He was survived by his second wife, the former Hope Melamed, as well as by three daughters, eight grandchildren and 13 great-grandchildren. His 54-year-long first marriage to the former Nannette Rosenberg ended with her death in 1990.
