= Doreen Miller, Baroness Miller of Hendon =

The Right Honourable The Baroness Miller of Hendon MBE
- Miller in Parliament in 2012

Baroness-in-Waiting Government Whip
- In office 21 July 1994 – 2 May 1997
- Prime Minister: John Major
- Preceded by: The Lord Annaly
- Succeeded by: The Baroness Gould of Potternewton

Member of the House of Lords
- Lord Temporal
- Life peerage 14 October 1993 – 21 June 2014

Personal details
- Born: 13 June 1933
- Died: 21 June 2014 (aged 81)
- Party: Conservative
- Education: London School of Economics

Doreen Miller, Baroness Miller of Hendon, MBE (née Feldman; 13 June 1933 – 21 June 2014) was a British politician (Conservative Party).

== Life ==
Miller was educated at Brondesbury and Kilburn High School, the London School of Economics (LLB, 1957) and the University of Hull, where she was awarded an MA.

Miller was appointed a Member of the Order of the British Empire (MBE) in the 1990 New Year Honours for services to women's rights.

She served as a Government Whip from 1994 to 1997 and as Opposition Whip from 1997 to 1999. From 1995 to 1997 she served as Government Spokesperson for health and from 1996 to 1997 for Education and Employment.

She was created a life peer on 14 October 1993 as Baroness Miller of Hendon, of Gore in the London Borough of Barnet.

Baroness Miller was the Chairman of the charity Attend (then National Association of Hospital and Community Friends) from 1998 to 2003. When she retired in 2003, she was honored as a vice president and held that position until she died in 2014.

From 2002 she was Vice-chair of the Israel Group. She also sat on the House of Lords Information Committee and an EU Sub-Committee

Coat of arms of Doreen Miller, Baroness Miller of Hendon
Coronet That of a Baroness Escutcheon Vert on a fess between in chief a windmill of four sails in the form of stylised petals Or and in base the tree sorbus torminals erased three sparrows close Proper. Supporters Dexter a female figure habited in blouse and skirt temp 1905 wearing from right shoulder to left hip a sash of the suffragette movement holding in the dexter hand a pole thereon a placard with the words "Votes For Women" all Proper; sinister a female figure also habited in a day dress rose decorated with silver grey hatted hand against dexter shoulder a scroll of the law Proper and by the other a torch azure flamed Gules. Motto Quare Non? (Why Not?) Orders Member of the Most Excellent Order of the British Empire
