= Kanya King =

British businesswoman (1969–2026)

Kanya King CBE
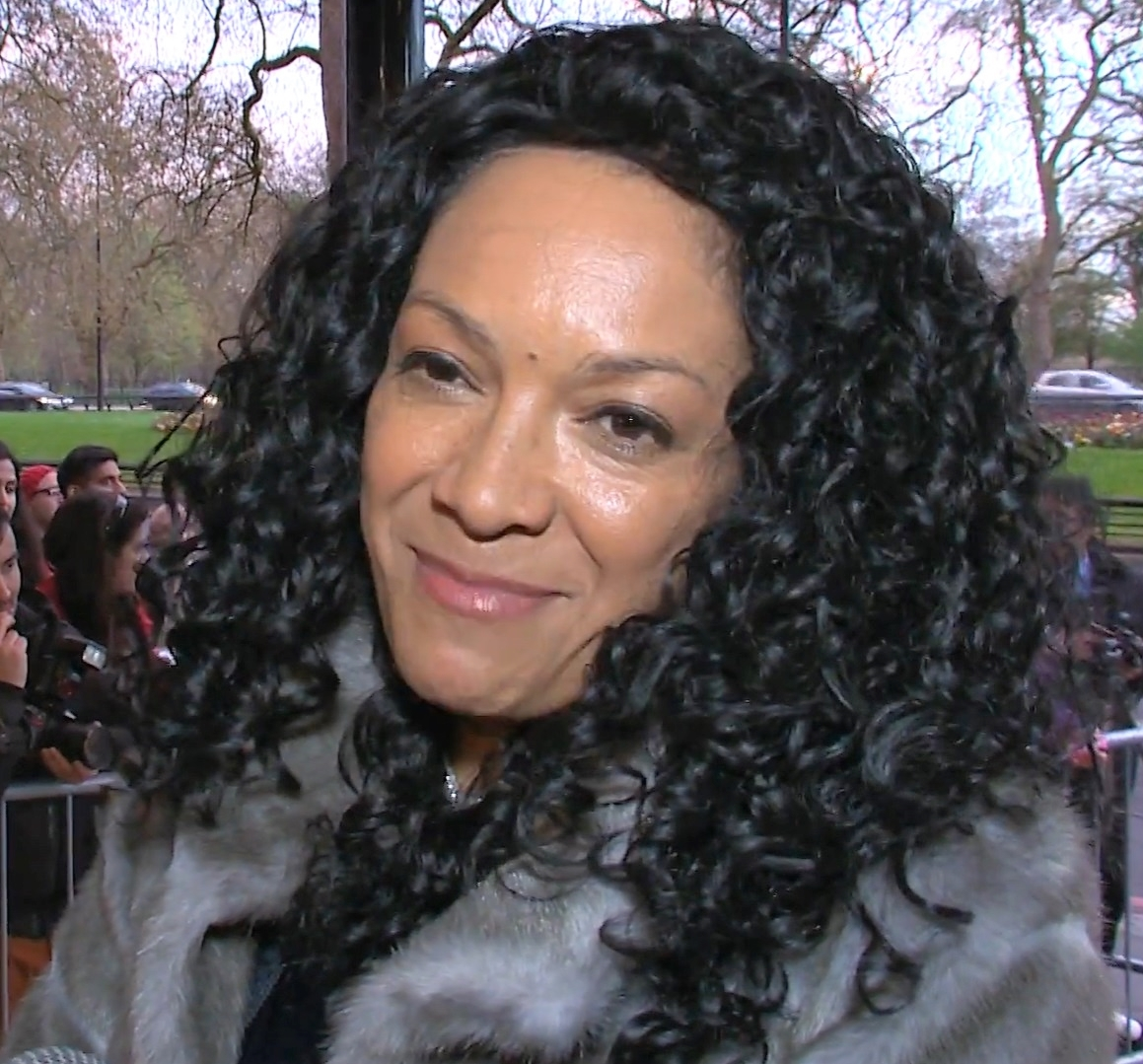
- King at the Asian Awards in 2014
- Born: 12 February 1969; Kilburn, London, England
- Died: 3 June 2026 (aged 57)
- Education: Goldsmiths, University of London
- Occupation: Businesswoman
- Known for: Founder of the MOBO Awards
- Awards: BBC 100 Women (2013)
- Website: www.kanyaking.com

Kanya King (12 February 1969 – 3 June 2026) was a British businesswoman who founded the MOBO Awards in 1996, honouring achievements in "music of Black origin".

== Early life and education ==
Kanya King was born in Kilburn, London, on 12 February 1969, to an Irish mother – Mary (nee Folan) – and a Ghanaian father, the youngest of their nine children. Her father, Christian Ocloo, died when she was 13 years old. King attended Queens Park Community School until, aged 16, she gave birth to her son, after which she dropped out of school.

King would later attend the University of London's Goldsmiths' College, obtaining a bachelor of arts degree.

== Career ==
King was working as a television researcher when she came up with the idea for awards to recognise music of black origin, such as gospel, jazz, R&B, soul, reggae and hip-hop. She sold the idea to the head of London Weekend Television (LWT) after a chance meeting at an Arsenal FC event and, in just seven weeks, King organised the first MOBO Awards, remortgaging her house in order to raise the money to do so. Through her persistence, and supported by the few black industry executives, such as Dej Mahoney and Keith Harris (former manager of Stevie Wonder), the first award show took place in November 1996 at London's Connaught Rooms, broadcast on Carlton Television, the weekday counterpart of LWT. The show would lead to the establishment over time of the MOBO Fringe Festival, MOBO Unsung, MOBO Musicians Amplified, and House of MOBO.

King appeared alongside four multi-millionaire panel members in the ITV series Fortune - Million Pound Giveaway (2007), where members of the panel decide which "contestants" to award no-strings grants, based on the merits of their pitch. In 2017, King spoke to the Evening Standard about building the MOBO Awards brand from being a single mother at the age of 16. She also spoke to the NME about diversity and inclusion in the creative industry, as well as to Music Week about the 22nd MOBO Awards being the strongest yet. In March 2026, King celebrated 30 years of the MOBO awards.

== Recognition ==
In the 1999 Birthday Honours, King was appointed a Member of the Order of the British Empire (MBE) for services to the Music Industry; she was promoted to Commander of the same Order (CBE) in the 2018 Birthday Honours for services to music and culture.

She was also awarded an honorary fellowship of Goldsmiths, University of London (2004), an honorary doctorate of Business Administration at London Metropolitan University (2006), as well as an honorary doctorate from Leeds Metropolitan University (2008).

In 2011, King was named one of London's Most Influential People by the London Evening Standard, one of Britain's Most Entrepreneurial Women (Real Business) and was regularly listed in the Powerlist as one of Britain's Most Influential Black People. She was recognised by the music industry in 2016, with the "Media Pioneer Award" at the Music Week Women In Music Awards. In February 2013, she was rated as one of the 100 most powerful women in the United Kingdom by Woman's Hour on BBC Radio 4, and also featured on the BBC's 100 Women. In October 2015, King was listed by UK-based company Richtopia at number 60 in the list of 100 Most Influential British Entrepreneurs.

In 2021, she received "The Strat", a special honour for an industry icon, presented to her at the Music Week Awards by Craig David.

In 2025, King was awarded one of The Ivors Academy's Honours, recognising "advocates and innovators who champion songwriters and composers and help to build a stronger, fairer and more inclusive music industry", other recipients including Raye and Sir Richard Branson.

== Personal life and death ==
In December 2024, King announced that she had been diagnosed with stage IV bowel cancer. She said at the MOBOs in February 2025: "I never allowed someone to define my limits. Not in life. Not in business. And I'm certainly not going to have that happen now." Attending the MOBO awards in March 2026, she was honoured on stage by Pharrell Williams, recipient of the Global Songwriter Award, who stated: "This is a woman who never stops working.... When you love what you get to do, you're never working, you're just having the time of your life. And that's the same energy that you can look in the mirror and stare cancer in the face like Kanya King and stand here tonight."

She died, as a result of her cancer, on 3 June 2026, aged 57. A statement by the MOBO organisation announcing her death said: "What Kanya created was never simply an awards ceremony. It was an act of cultural justice. MOBO did not just celebrate Black music; it legitimised it, amplified it, and demonstrated its commercial and creative power to a world that had too often chosen not to see it."

== Honours and awards ==
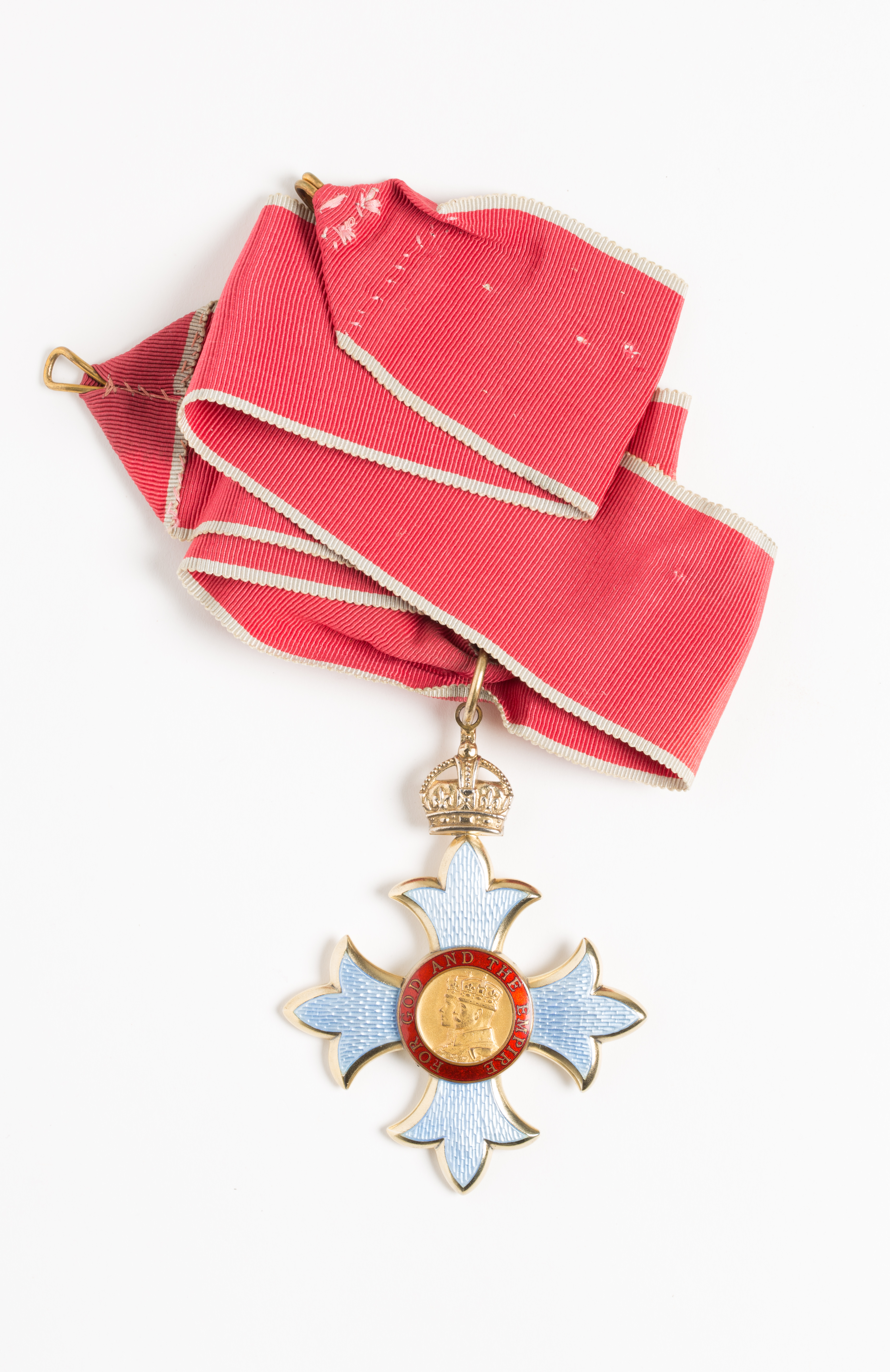
CBE insignia

- Commander of the Order of the British Empire (CBE) (2018), for services to music and the creative industry
- Honorary Fellow of Goldsmiths, University of London (2004)
- Honorary Doctorate of Business Administration, London Metropolitan University (2006)
- Presented with the Ambassador Award at the 12th annual NatWest Everywoman Awards (2014)
- Honorary PhD, University of the Arts, recognising her commitment and success within the creative industries
- Honorary Doctorate of Laws (LLD), University of Exeter, for outstanding achievements in the field of entrepreneurship (2014)
- Honoured Patron of Music at the City of Westminster College
- Lifetime Achievement Award from the Institute of Enterprise and Entrepreneurship (IOEE)
- Honorary Doctorate of Music, Leeds Metropolitan University (2008)
- Honorary Doctorate (D.Mus)from SOAS University of London presented in 2017
