= Richard Madeley =

English television presenter and writer (born 1957)

- Madeley in 2019
- Born: Richard Holt Madeley; 13 May 1956 (age 70); Romford, Essex, England
- Occupations: Television presenter; writer
- Years active: 1976–present
- Television: This Morning (1988–2001, 2019–2020); Richard and Judy (2001–2009); The Wright Stuff (2012–2017); Good Morning Britain (2017–present)
- Spouses: Lynda Hooley (m. 1977; div. 1983); Judy Finnigan (m. 1986)
- Children: 2, including Chloe
- Relatives: James Haskell (son-in-law)
- Website: officialrichardandjudy.com

Richard Holt Madeley (/meɪdli/; born 13 May 1956) is an English television presenter, journalist and writer. Alongside his wife Judy Finnigan, he presented ITV's This Morning (1988–2001, 2019–2020) and Channel 4 chat show Richard & Judy (2001–2008).

Madeley's solo projects include the series Fortune: Million Pound Giveaway (2007) and covering for The Chris Evans Breakfast Show on BBC Radio 2. He was the main relief presenter of Channel 5's The Wright Stuff (2012–2017), and since 2017, he has been one of three main relief presenters of ITV breakfast show Good Morning Britain.

== Early life ==
Richard Holt Madeley was born on 13 May 1956 in Romford, Essex, the son of journalist Christopher Holt Madeley (died 1977), from a family of tenant farmers at Kiln Farm, Shawbury, Shropshire, and Mary Claire (née McEwan). His mother was Canadian. He attended Shenfield High School in Brentwood.

In 2008, Madeley told The Guardian that his father was physically abusive, with little provocation. He estimated that during a period of two years his father beat him with a stick about 25 times. The final and most vicious beating occurred when Richard was aged 10. His father ordered him to remove his shirt and then hit Richard "repeatedly, dementedly, with a stick". The wounds he suffered kept him away from school. The abuse stopped when his mother, previously out at work so unaware of her husband's harsh discipline, told him that she would call the police if it happened again; Madeley stated that after this, his father gave a full and frank apology and he never hit Richard again.

In 2014, Madeley said he was surprised by the level of media interest the beatings generated, "because to me, it was abnormal not to be hit back then", and said he almost regretted writing about it in his 2008 book Fathers and Sons, noting to the general public the beatings are not the defining thing about his father, and calling his father "fun, bright, warm and tactile". Christopher Madeley had himself been subject to physical abuse by his father, Geoffrey.

== Career ==
Madeley joined BBC Radio Carlisle at the age of 19. He moved to Granada Reports in the early 1980s where he met his future wife Judy Finnigan.

=== Richard & Judy ===
The couple left This Morning in 2001, having been approached by Channel 4 to host a similar show, called Richard & Judy, shown for an hour in the early evenings. The show was produced by Cactus TV.

In February 2007, Madeley and Finnigan apologised live on air due to the discovery of a TV quiz phone scam regarding the daily phone-in competition You Say We Pay. Madeley and Finnigan took the decision to suspend the daily quiz until further notice. Later that week, the news media confirmed that police investigations would be pursued, meaning the couple could be subject to a police interview. Channel 4 admitted the scam may have been in force for two series of the show. Whilst Madeley and Finnigan had urged callers to continue entering, it was confirmed that winners were picked in the first 10 minutes of the show. The couple both denied being involved in the scam.

Due to low audience numbers, the show ended in July 2009. The presenters stated that viewers "simply couldn't find us".

Madeley and Finnigan's show Richard & Judy Book Club was shown on digital channel Watch.

=== Other work ===
Whilst working on their daytime show, the couple have been involved in other projects. Madeley and Finnigan won on the season finale of season 2 of a TV version of the classic board game Cluedo in 1991. Madeley presented the last two seasons of the game show, quiz show Connections, from 1988–1989, and the daytime quiz Runway from 1988–1993. In 1999, he presented a series on the world's wildest weather, Eye of the Storm. He hosted the ITV1 show Fortune: Million Pound Giveaway in 2007, and was the presenter for the unaired pilot of the home video show You've Been Framed in 1990.

Madeley hosted the news quiz Have I Got News for You on 14 December 2007, and then featured as a guest panellist in May 2011. He sat in for Richard Bacon on BBC Radio 5 Live. Madeley also covered for Dawn Patrol presenter Sarah Kennedy during the week of 27–30 April 2009, for Zoe Ball for two months until 27 February, and on numerous occasions for Chris Evans' Breakfast Show, all on BBC Radio 2. He appeared on Piers Morgan's Life Stories in April 2009 and was a guest on BBC Question Time in January 2010. In 2011, Madeley was featured in the eighth season of Who Do You Think You Are?, tracing his mother's ancestors to Canada and the United States. In April 2013, he appeared as a Dictionary Corner guest on Countdown for five shows.

Madeley presented his own show on Radio 2, Madeley on Sunday (previously Made on Sunday), covering for Terry Wogan's Weekend Wogan over Wogan's holidays. Wogan died in January 2016, and Madeley's show became a semi-permanent replacement. From April 2016, the slot was shared between Madeley and Michael Ball, with Madeley presenting for approximately 10 weeks a year and Ball taking the remainder.

In 2002, the couple co-wrote their autobiography, Richard and Judy: The Autobiography, published by Hodder & Stoughton. In 2008, Madeley wrote the book Fathers and Sons, which charts his family history; it was published by Simon & Schuster. Madeley is the author of three novels: Some Day I'll Find You (2013), The Way You Look Tonight (2014) and The Night Book (2016).

Madeley and Finnigan were the subjects of This Is Your Life in 1997 when they were surprised by Michael Aspel live on air while broadcasting This Morning.

Since August 2017, Madeley has been a relief presenter on ITV's breakfast programme Good Morning Britain. He has been compared by viewers to the fictional talk show and radio host Alan Partridge for his perceived parallels to Steve Coogan's bumbling, tone-deaf comedy character. Madeley himself has remarked that he believes this comparison is "a bit unfair".

In November 2018, The Telegraph appointed Madeley as their agony uncle to succeed Graham Norton who had stood down the previous month. In June 2020, he apologised after being criticised for the advice he gave a reader who thought their neighbour could be experiencing domestic violence. It included the line "If they were going to kill each other, they'd have done it by now." The charity Refuge said he had written "appalling and dangerous advice".

In January 2021, Madeley covered for Steph McGovern on her Channel 4 programme Steph's Packed Lunch while she had to self-isolate due to the coronavirus pandemic. In November 2021, Madeley was a contestant on the twenty-first series of I'm a Celebrity...Get Me Out of Here!., but withdrew after being taken to hospital due to an unspecified illness.

== Personal life ==
Madeley's first marriage to Lynda Hooley, at age 21, lasted five years and ended in divorce. Madeley has said that he believes the marriage was a mistake, and he had ten affairs during that time. Nine days after the wedding, while the couple were still on their honeymoon, his father died at the age of 49.

Madeley met Judy Finnigan in 1982 when they worked on separate programmes for Granada Television. At the time, they were both married to other people. The couple married on 21 November 1986 in Manchester. They have two children together, both born in Manchester: Jack Christopher (born 1986) and Chloe Susannah (born 1987). They live in Hampstead Garden Suburb, London, having moved there from Didsbury, Manchester, in 1996 when Granada relocated This Morning from Liverpool to London. They also have a second home at Talland Bay, near Polperro, Cornwall, having been on holiday together there before their marriage. Madeley is also stepfather to twin sons from Finnigan's first marriage to journalist David Henshaw.

In October 2011, Madeley was awarded an Honorary Doctor of Letters from Anglia Ruskin University for his contribution to television, reading, entertainment and media.

In 1994, while the co-host of This Morning, Madeley faced legal issues when he was arrested at a Tesco supermarket in Manchester for allegedly failing to pay for certain items, including champagne. He was subsequently acquitted of all shoplifting charges. Madeley attributed the incident to a lapse in memory, stating that he had simply forgotten to pay for the champagne while going through the checkout. Reflecting on the experience in 2008, he described the incident as a 'horrible cropper' and said the negative publicity was 'mortifying', although he had since been able to joke about it.

== Political views ==
Madeley has expressed strong support for former Prime Minister Tony Blair. In a 2001 interview for The Guardian, he said the UK had got better under New Labour, identified independent MP Martin Bell as his favourite politician, and expressed support for the euro. He supported the Iraq War, saying international law on the issue was "incredibly complicated".

Madeley was critical of the UK government's response to the COVID-19 virus, especially the lockdown response after 24 March 2020, saying there was "no point in running away and hiding from the virus".
