= Peter Morley (football club president) =

Peter Lawrence Morley CBE (1929 – 14 September 2013) was the President of Crystal Palace Football Club, an English football team.

Morley was born in 1929.

During the 1980s and 1990s he served on the board of the British Racing and Sports Car Club. Morley also was a Trustee of the Motorsport Safety Fund and chairman of the National Retail Training Council. He was appointed CBE in the 1994 New Year Honours for services to training and the retail industry. During the 1980s, he was Director of Human Resources at Tesco Stores.

After Chairman Mark Goldberg fell into financial ruin in 1999, and the club into administration, Morley was appointed temporary chairman. He stayed in this role until the summer of 2000, when Simon Jordan took control of the club.

On 15 September 2013 Crystal Palace announced that Morley had died. He left behind his wife Paula and daughters Fran and Alex.

Preceded by Mark Goldberg	Crystal Palace chairman 1999-2000	Succeeded by Simon Jordan
