= Tony Berry =

British businessman (1940–2022)

Anthony Berry (22 October 1940 – 26 August 2022) was a British businessman who was the founder of Blue Arrow recruitment agency.

== Life and career ==
Brought up in Tottenham and educated at The Latymer School in Edmonton, Berry played cricket for Middlesex Young Amateurs and became an apprentice football professional for Tottenham Hotspur.

Berry qualified as management accountant with Guinness before joining the management team of an office cleaning company where he worked throughout the 1970s. In 1981 he bought a controlling stake in Blue Arrow, a small recruitment business in St Albans, which he built into the United Kingdom's largest recruitment agency and a constituent of the FTSE 100 Index.

Berry was forced to retire in 1989. He subsequently became Deputy Chairman of Tottenham Hotspur.

Berry latterly served as the chairman of Berry Recruitment Group, which was established in 2009. He died on 26 August 2022, at the age of 81.
