= Brook Street Bureau =

Brook Street (UK) Limited is a UK recruitment specialist for office support, business professional, public sector and social care occupations.

Founded in Mayfair in 1946 by Margery Hurst, the company is part of the ManpowerGroup family of brands, having been acquired in 1985.

== Overview ==
In 1965, Brook Street was the first employment agency to be listed on the London Stock Exchange, and in 1985 it was the first to become a member of the British Quality Foundation. In 1987, it joined the Employers Forum on Disability. Brook Street (UK) Ltd employs more than 300 staff in more than 20 branches nationwide and has 15,000 employer clients each year. It has 9,000 temporary workers at any one time and 1,000 new applicants per week.

Brook Street is a member of the Recruitment and Employment Confederation, a lobby group for the interests of British employment agencies.

== See also ==
- UK agency worker law
- Temporary worker
- British labour law
