= List of Dancing on Ice contestants =

The following is a list of Dancing on Ice celebrity contestants from 2006 to 2025 along with their professional partners and competition placement.

== Contestants ==
Key
Winners
Runners-up
Third place
Withdrew from competition

Celebrity	Notability	Professional partner	Series	Placement
Tamara Beckwith	Socialite	Sergey Malyshev	Series 1	10th
Andi Peters	Television presenter	Tamara Sharp	Series 1	9th
Andrea McLean	GMTV weather presenter	Doug Webster	Series 1	8th
John Barrowman	Actor & singer	Olga Sharutenko	Series 1	7th
Sean Wilson	Coronation Street actor	Marika Humphreys	Series 1	6th
Kelly Holmes	Olympic middle-distance runner	Todd Sand	Series 1	5th
David Seaman	England goalkeeper	Pam O'Connor	Series 1	4th
Bonnie Langford	Actress & West End dancer	Matt Evers	Series 1	3rd
Stefan Booth	Actor	Kristina Lenko	Series 1	2nd
Gaynor Faye	Coronation Street actress	Daniel Whiston	Series 1	1st
Neil Fox	Radio presenter & talent show judge	Pamela O'Connor	Series 2	11th
Phil Gayle	Newsreader & freelance journalist	Natalia Pestova	Series 2	10th
Ulrika Jonsson	Television presenter	Pavel Aubrecht	Series 2	9th
Stephen Gately	Boyzone singer	Kristina Lenko	Series 2	8th
Kay Burley	Sky newscaster	Fred Palascak	Series 2	7th
Lisa Scott-Lee	Steps singer	Matt Evers	Series 2	6th
Lee Sharpe	England footballer	Frankie Poultney	Series 2	5th
Emily Symons	Home and Away & Emmerdale actress	Daniel Whiston	Series 2	4th
Duncan James	Blue singer	Maria Filippov	Series 2	3rd
Clare Buckfield	Actress	Andrei Lipanov	Series 2	2nd
Kyran Bracken	England rugby player	Melanie Lambert	Series 2	1st
Sarah Greene	Television presenter	Fred Palascak	Series 3	13th
Natalie Pinkham	Sports television presenter	Andrei Lipanov	Series 3	12th
Michael Underwood	Television presenter	Melanie Lambert	Series 3	WD
Samantha Mumba	Singer-songwriter	Pavel Aubrecht	Series 3	10th
Aggie MacKenzie	How Clean Is Your House? co-presenter	Sergey Malyshev	Series 3	9th
Tim Vincent	Television presenter	Victoria Borzenkova	Series 3	8th
Steve Backley	Olympic javelin thrower	Susie Lipanova	Series 3	7th
Linda Lusardi	Model & Emmerdale actress	Daniel Whiston	Series 3	6th
Greg Rusedski	Professional tennis player	Kristina Lenko	Series 3	5th
Gareth Gates	Singer-songwriter	Maria Filippov	Series 3	4th
Zaraah Abrahams	Coronation Street actress	Fred Palascak	Series 3	3rd
Chris Fountain	Hollyoaks actor	Frankie Poultney	Series 3	2nd
Suzanne Shaw	Hear'Say singer	Matt Evers	Series 3	1st
Graeme Le Saux	England & Chelsea footballer	Kristina Lenko	Series 4	13th
Gemma Bissix	EastEnders & Hollyoaks actress	Andrei Lipanov	Series 4	12th
Jeremy Edwards	Holby City actor	Darya Nucci	Series 4	11th
Michael Underwood	Television presenter	Melanie Lambert	Series 4	10th
Todd Carty	Stage & screen actor	Susie Lipanova	Series 4	9th
Ellery Hanley	England rugby player	Frankie Poultney	Series 4	8th
Melinda Messenger	Glamour model & television presenter	Fred Palascak	Series 4	7th
Roxanne Pallett	Emmerdale actress	Daniel Whiston	Series 4	6th
Zoe Salmon	Blue Peter presenter	Matt Evers	Series 4	5th
Coleen Nolan	Singer & Loose Women panellist	Stuart Widdall	Series 4	4th
Jessica Taylor	Liberty X singer	Pavel Aubrecht	Series 4	3rd
Donal MacIntyre	Investigative journalist	Florentine Houdinière	Series 4	2nd
Ray Quinn	Actor & The X Factor runner-up	Maria Filippov	Series 4	1st
Sinitta	Pop singer & aide to Simon Cowell	Andrei Lipanov	Series 5	14th
Bobby Davro	Comedian & impressionist	Molly Moenkhoff	Series 5	13th
Jeremy Sheffield	Holby City actor	Susie Lipanova	Series 5	12th
Tana Ramsay	Cookbook author & television presenter	Stuart Widdall	Series 5	11th
Heather Mills	Model & businesswoman	Matt Evers	Series 5	10th
Hilary Jones	General practitioner & television presenter	Alexandra Schauman	Series 5	9th
Sharron Davies	Olympic medley swimmer	Pavel Aubrecht	Series 5	8th
Emily Atack	The Inbetweeners actress	Fred Palascak	Series 5	7th
Mikey Graham	Boyzone singer	Melanie Lambert	Series 5	6th
Danny Young	Coronation Street actor	Frankie Poultney	Series 5	5th
Danniella Westbrook	EastEnders actress	Matthew Gonzalez	Series 5	4th
Kieron Richardson	Hollyoaks actor	Brianne Delcourt	Series 5	3rd
Gary Lucy	The Bill actor	Maria Filippov	Series 5	2nd
Hayley Tamaddon	Emmerdale actress	Daniel Whiston	Series 5	1st
Angela Rippon	Television journalist & newsreader	Sean Rice	Series 6	Did not qualify
Nadia Sawalha	EastEnders actress & television presenter	Mark Hanretty	Series 6	Did not qualify
Craig McLachlan	Neighbours & Home and Away actor	Maria Filippov	Series 6	Did not qualify
Elen Rivas	Model	Łukasz Różycki	Series 6	Did not qualify
Steven Arnold	Coronation Street actor	Nina Ulanova	Series 6	12th
Dominic Cork	International cricketer	Alexandra Schauman	Series 6	11th
Jennifer Metcalfe	Hollyoaks actress	Sylvain Longchambon	Series 6	10th
Comedy Dave	BBC Radio 1 presenter	Frankie Poultney	Series 6	9th
Kerry Katona	Media personality & Atomic Kitten singer	Daniel Whiston	Series 6	8th
Vanilla Ice	Rapper	Katie Stainsby	Series 6	7th
Denise Welch	Actress & Loose Women panellist	Matt Evers	Series 6	6th
Jeff Brazier	Television presenter	Isabelle Gauthier	Series 6	5th
Johnson Beharry	British Army regiment soldier	Jodeyne Higgins	Series 6	4th
Chloe Madeley	Freelance journalist & model	Michael Zenezini	Series 6	3rd
Laura Hamilton	Children's television presenter	Colin Ratushniak	Series 6	2nd
Sam Attwater	EastEnders actor	Brianne Delcourt	Series 6	1st
Andy Akinwolere	Blue Peter presenter	Maria Filippov	Series 7	15th
Laila Morse	EastEnders actress	Łukasz Różycki	Series 7	14th
Mark Rhodes	Children's television presenter	Frankie Poultney	Series 7	13th
Corey Feldman	Hollywood actor	Brooke Castile	Series 7	12th
Charlene Tilton	Dallas actress	Matthew Gonzalez	Series 7	11th
Rosemary Conley	Businesswoman, author & broadcaster	Mark Hanretty	Series 7	10th
Heidi Range	Sugababes singer	Andrei Lipanov	Series 7	9th
Sébastien Foucan	Freerunner	Brianne Delcourt	Series 7	8th
Sam Nixon	Children's television presenter	Alexandra Schauman	Series 7	7th
Andy Whyment	Coronation Street actor	Vicky Ogden	Series 7	6th
Chemmy Alcott	World Cup alpine ski racer	Sean Rice	Series 7	5th
Jennifer Ellison	Stage & screen actress	Daniel Whiston	Series 7	4th
Chico	The X Factor contestant	Jodeyne Higgins	Series 7	3rd
Jorgie Porter	Hollyoaks actress	Matt Evers	Series 7	2nd
Matthew Wolfenden	Emmerdale actor	Nina Ulanova	Series 7	1st
Pamela Anderson	Actress & Playboy model	Matt Evers	Series 8	12th
Lauren Goodger	The Only Way Is Essex cast member	Michael Zenezini	Series 8	11th
Oona King	Labour Party politician	Mark Hanretty	Series 8	10th
Anthea Turner	Television presenter	Andy Buchanan	Series 8	9th
Shayne Ward	Singer & The X Factor winner	Maria Filippov	Series 8	8th
Joe Pasquale	Comedian	Vicky Ogden	Series 8	7th
Keith Chegwin	Television presenter & actor	Olga Sharutenko	Series 8	6th
Samia Ghadie	Coronation Street actress	Sylvain Longchambon	Series 8	5th
Gareth Thomas	Wales rugby player	Robin Johnstone	Series 8	WD
Luke Campbell	Olympic boxer	Jenna Smith	Series 8	3rd
Matt Lapinskas	EastEnders actor	Brianne Delcourt	Series 8	2nd
Beth Tweddle	Olympic artistic gymnast	Daniel Whiston	Series 8	1st
Jorgie Porter	Series 7	Sylvain Longchambon	Series 9 (All-Stars)	14th
Joe Pasquale	Series 8	Robin Johnstone	Series 9 (All-Stars)	13th
David Seaman	Series 1	Frankie Poultney	Series 9 (All-Stars)	12th
Gary Lucy	Series 5	Katie Stainsby	Series 9 (All-Stars)	11th
Todd Carty	Series 4	Alexandra Schauman	Series 9 (All-Stars)	10th
Zaraah Abrahams	Series 3	Andy Buchanan	Series 9 (All-Stars)	9th
Bonnie Langford	Series 1	Andrei Lipanov	Series 9 (All-Stars)	8th
Gareth Gates	Series 3	Brianne Delcourt	Series 9 (All-Stars)	7th
Suzanne Shaw	Series 3	Matt Evers	Series 9 (All-Stars)	6th
Kyran Bracken	Series 2	Nina Ulanova	Series 9 (All-Stars)	5th
Sam Attwater	Series 6	Vicky Ogden	Series 9 (All-Stars)	4th
Beth Tweddle	Series 8	Łukasz Różycki	Series 9 (All-Stars)	3rd
Hayley Tamaddon	Series 5	Daniel Whiston	Series 9 (All-Stars)	2nd
Ray Quinn	Series 4	Maria Filippov	Series 9 (All-Stars)	1st
Candice Brown	The Great British Bake Off winner	Matt Evers	Series 10	12th
Stephanie Waring	Hollyoaks actress	Sylvain Longchambon	Series 10	11th
Perri Shakes-Drayton	Olympic hurdler	Hamish Gaman	Series 10	10th
Cheryl Baker	Bucks Fizz singer & television presenter	Daniel Whiston	Series 10	9th
Lemar	Singer-songwriter & producer	Melody Le Moal	Series 10	8th
Antony Cotton	Coronation Street actor	Brandee Malto	Series 10	6th
Donna Air	Actress & television presenter	Mark Hanretty	Series 10	6th
Alex Beresford	ITV Weather forecaster	Brianne Delcourt	Series 10	5th
Kem Cetinay	Love Island winner	Alex Murphy	Series 10	4th
Max Evans	Rugby union player	Ale Izquierdo	Series 10	3rd
Brooke Vincent	Coronation Street actress	Matej Silecky	Series 10	2nd
Jake Quickenden	Singer & The X Factor contestant	Vanessa Bauer	Series 10	1st
Mark Little	Neighbours actor	Brianne Delcourt	Series 11	12th
Richard Blackwood	EastEnders actor	Carlotta Edwards	Series 11	11th
Didi Conn	Grease actress	Łukasz Różycki	Series 11	10th
Saira Khan	Television presenter	Mark Hanretty	Series 11	9th
Gemma Collins	The Only Way Is Essex cast member	Matt Evers	Series 11	8th
Ryan Sidebottom	England cricketer	Brandee Malto	Series 11	7th
Jane Danson	Coronation Street actress	Sylvain Longchambon	Series 11	6th
Melody Thornton	The Pussycat Dolls singer	Alexander Demetriou	Series 11	5th
Brian McFadden	Westlife singer	Alex Murphy	Series 11	4th
Saara Aalto	Singer-songwriter	Hamish Gaman	Series 11	3rd
Wes Nelson	Love Island finalist	Vanessa Bauer	Series 11	2nd
James Jordan	Strictly Come Dancing professional	Alexandra Schauman	Series 11	1st
Trisha Goddard	Television presenter	Łukasz Różycki	Series 12	12th
Lucrezia Millarini	ITV News presenter & journalist	Brendyn Hatfield	Series 12	11th
Radzi Chinyanganya	Former Blue Peter presenter	Jess Hatfield	Series 12	10th
Caprice	Model & actress	Hamish Gaman	Series 12	WD
Kevin Kilbane	Republic of Ireland footballer	Brianne Delcourt	Series 12	8th
Ian "H" Watkins	Steps singer	Matt Evers	Series 12	7th
Maura Higgins	Love Island finalist	Alexander Demetriou	Series 12	6th
Lisa George	Coronation Street actress	Tom Naylor	Series 12	5th
Ben Hanlin	Magician & television presenter	Carlotta Edwards	Series 12	4th
Libby Clegg	Paralympic sprinter	Mark Hanretty	Series 12	3rd
Perri Kiely	Diversity dancer	Vanessa Bauer	Series 12	2nd
Joe Swash	EastEnders actor & television presenter	Alexandra Schauman & Alex Murphy	Series 12	1st
Myleene Klass	Hear'Say singer & presenter	Łukasz Różycki	Series 13	14th
Denise van Outen	Actress, singer & presenter	Matt Evers	Series 13	WD
Graham Bell	Olympic skier & broadcaster	Karina Manta	Series 13	12th
Rufus Hound	Comedian, actor & presenter	Robin Johnstone	Series 13	WD
Billie Shepherd	The Only Way Is Essex cast member	Mark Hanretty	Series 13	WD
Matt Richardson	Comedian & television presenter	Vicky Ogden	Series 13	9th
Joe-Warren Plant	Emmerdale actor	Vanessa Bauer	Series 13	WD
Amy Tinkler	Olympic artistic gymnast	Joe Johnson	Series 13	7th
Jason Donovan	Actor & singer	Alexandra Schauman	Series 13	WD
Rebekah Vardy	Television personality & model	Andy Buchanan	Series 13	5th
Lady Leshurr	Rapper	Brendyn Hatfield	Series 13	4th
Colin Jackson	Olympic hurdler	Klabera Komini	Series 13	3rd
Faye Brookes	Coronation Street actress	Hamish Gaman & Matt Evers	Series 13	2nd
Sonny Jay	Capital FM presenter	Angela Egan	Series 13	1st
Ben Foden	England rugby player	Robin Johnstone	Series 14	12th
Ria Hebden	Television presenter	Łukasz Różycki	Series 14	11th
Rachel Stevens	S Club 7 singer	Brendyn Hatfield	Series 14	10th
Liberty Poole	Love Island contestant	Joe Johnson	Series 14	9th
Bez	Happy Mondays musician & dancer	Angela Egan	Series 14	8th
Sally Dynevor	Coronation Street actress	Matt Evers	Series 14	7th
Stef Reid	Paralympic athlete	Andy Buchanan	Series 14	6th
Kye Whyte	Olympic cyclist	Tippy Packard	Series 14	4th
Connor Ball	The Vamps bassist	Alexandra Schauman	Series 14	4th
Kimberly Wyatt	The Pussycat Dolls singer	Mark Hanretty	Series 14	3rd
Brendan Cole	Strictly Come Dancing professional	Vanessa Bauer	Series 14	2nd
Regan Gascoigne	Professional dancer	Karina Manta	Series 14	1st
John Fashanu	England footballer & television presenter	Alexandra Schauman	Series 15	11th
Michelle Heaton	Liberty X singer	Łukasz Różycki	Series 15	10th
Ekin-Su Cülcüloğlu	Love Island winner & actress	Brendyn Hatfield	Series 15	9th
Patsy Palmer	EastEnders actress & DJ	Matt Evers	Series 15	8th
Darren Harriott	Stand-up comedian & presenter	Tippy Packard	Series 15	7th
Carley Stenson	Hollyoaks actress & singer	Mark Hanretty	Series 15	6th
Mollie Gallagher	Coronation Street actress	Sylvain Longchambon	Series 15	4th
Siva Kaneswaran	The Wanted singer	Klabera Komini	Series 15	4th
The Vivienne	Drag queen & RuPaul's Drag Race UK winner	Colin Grafton	Series 15	3rd
Joey Essex	The Only Way Is Essex cast member	Vanessa Bauer	Series 15	2nd
Nile Wilson	Olympic artistic gymnast	Olivia Smart	Series 15	1st
Ricky Hatton	Professional boxer	Robin Johnstone	Series 16	12th
Hannah Spearritt	S Club 7 singer & actress	Andy Buchanan	Series 16	11th
Claire Sweeney	Actress, singer & television presenter	Colin Grafton	Series 16	10th
Roxy Shahidi	Emmerdale actress	Sylvain Longchambon	Series 16	9th
Lou Sanders	Stand-up comedian & writer	Brendyn Hatfield	Series 16	8th
Ricky Norwood	EastEnders actor	Annette Dytrt	Series 16	7th
Eddie "The Eagle" Edwards	Olympic ski jumper	Vicky Ogden	Series 16	6th
Amber Davies	Love Island winner & West End performer	Simon Proulx-Sénécal	Series 16	5th
Greg Rutherford	Olympic long jumper & presenter	Vanessa James	Series 16	WD
Adele Roberts	BBC Radio 1 presenter	Mark Hanretty	Series 16	3rd
Miles Nazaire	Made in Chelsea cast member	Vanessa Bauer	Series 16	2nd
Ryan Thomas	Coronation Street actor	Amani Fancy	Series 16	1st
Chelsee Healey	Waterloo Road & Hollyoaks actress	Andy Buchanan	Series 17	11th
Josh Jones	Stand-up comedian	Tippy Packard	Series 17	WD
Ferne McCann	Television personality	Brendyn Hatfield	Series 17	9th
Steve Redgrave	Olympic rower	Vicky Ogden	Series 17	8th
Chris Taylor	Love Island contestant	Vanessa Bauer & Robin Johnstone	Series 17	7th
Charlie Brooks	EastEnders actress	Eric Radford	Series 17	6th
Mollie Pearce	The Traitors contestant	Colin Grafton	Series 17	5th
Dan Edgar	The Only Way Is Essex cast member	Vanessa James	Series 17	4th
Anton Ferdinand	Footballer & pundit	Annette Dytrt	Series 17	3rd
Michaela Strachan	Television presenter	Mark Hanretty	Series 17	2nd
Sam Aston	Coronation Street actor	Molly Lanaghan	Series 17	1st
