= Dancing on Ice series 16 =

Dancing on Ice
- Series 16
- Presented by: Holly Willoughby; Stephen Mulhern
- Judges: Ashley Banjo; Christopher Dean; Oti Mabuse; Jayne Torvill; Johnny Weir (Weeks 5–7)
- Celebrity winner: Ryan Thomas
- Professional winner: Amani Fancy
- No. of episodes: 9

Release
- Original network: ITV
- Original release: 14 January – 10 March 2024

Series chronology
- ← Previous; Series 15 Next → Series 17

The sixteenth series of Dancing on Ice began airing on ITV on 14 January 2024. During the finale of the fifteenth series, it was announced that Dancing on Ice had been renewed for another series. The series was once again filmed in the purpose-built studio at Bovingdon Airfield, which was set up for the tenth series.

In May 2023, Phillip Schofield who had presented the show since its inception, resigned from ITV after admitting to having had a relationship with a young male ITV employee, ultimately confirming his departure from both This Morning and Dancing on Ice. Stephen Mulhern, who previously stood in for Schofield as presenter during the fourteenth series, was announced as his replacement and co-hosted alongside Holly Willoughby. Ashley Banjo, Christopher Dean, Oti Mabuse, and Jayne Torvill all returned to the judging panel, though Banjo was replaced with Johnny Weir for three shows due to Diversity being on tour at the time.

== Professional skaters ==
On 21 October 2023, Matt Evers, who was the show's longest serving professional having been with Dancing on Ice since its inception, announced his departure after seventeen years. Speaking of his exit, Evers said that it was "time to hang up the skates for now" and that he "had loved every minute of it". A spokesperson for the show accredited Evers for being a "huge part of the show [...] and for creating some of the show's iconic moments. Two days later, ITV officially announced the line-up of professional skaters for the sixteenth series, confirming the returns of Mark Hanretty, Sylvain Longchambon, Vanessa Bauer, Brendyn Hatfield, Tippy Packard and Colin Grafton, and ultimately the departures of professional couple Alexandra Schauman and Łukasz Różycki; who left to take part in the skating theatre show Christmas on Ice in Tampa, Florida. Schauman said in statement that she and Różycki, who had been professionals on the show since the fifth and sixth series resepectively; had absolutely "loved being part of the show for so long" however noted that it had "taken a very different angle and that [they] struggled to agree with a lot of it", adding that they felt there was "no opportunity to grow on the show or take on different roles". Reigning champion Olivia Smart also left the show after one series, having returned to competitive skating, as well as Klabera Komini.

They were replaced by two-time British national champion Amani Fancy and German and Czech national champion Annette Dytrt, both of whom previously appeared as professionals on the German version of the show, six-time French national champion Vanessa James, who also represented Canada at the 2022 Winter Olympics and Armenian national champion Simon Proulx-Sénécal, as well as Andy Buchanan and Robin Johnstone who again returned as professionals after a series break. Vicky Ogden also returned as a replacement partner for Eddie the Eagle.

== Couples ==
On 26 September 2023, Ricky Hatton was announced as the first celebrity to be participating in the series. More celebrities continued to be revealed throughout the week before the line-up was concluded on 6 October. Gogglebox cast member Stephen Lustig-Webb was initially announced to be competing in the series, however it was announced on 21 October that he had been forced to withdraw from the competition after breaking his ankle. Eddie the Eagle was announced as his replacement on 25 October and was initially partnered with Tippy Packard, however prior to the beginning of the series, Packard suffered a knee injury and was replaced by Vicky Ogden.

Celebrity	Notability	Professional partner	Status
Ricky Hatton	Professional boxer	Robin Johnstone	Eliminated 1st on 21 January 2024
Hannah Spearritt	S Club 7 singer & actress	Andy Buchanan	Eliminated 2nd on 28 January 2024
Claire Sweeney	Actress, singer & television presenter	Colin Grafton	Eliminated 3rd on 4 February 2024
Roxy Shahidi	Emmerdale actress	Sylvain Longchambon	Eliminated 4th on 11 February 2024
Lou Sanders	Stand-up comedian & writer	Brendyn Hatfield	Eliminated 5th on 11 February 2024
Ricky Norwood	EastEnders actor	Annette Dytrt	Eliminated 6th on 18 February 2024
Eddie the Eagle	Olympic ski jumper	Vicky Ogden	Eliminated 7th on 25 February 2024
Amber Davies	Love Island winner & West End performer	Simon Proulx-Sénécal	Eliminated 8th on 3 March 2024
Greg Rutherford	Olympic long jumper & presenter	Vanessa James	Withdrew on 10 March 2024
Adele Roberts	BBC Radio 1 presenter	Mark Hanretty	Third place on 10 March 2024
Miles Nazaire	Made in Chelsea cast member	Vanessa Bauer	Runners-up on 10 March 2024
Ryan Thomas	Coronation Street actor	Amani Fancy	Winners on 10 March 2024

== Scoring chart ==
The highest score each week is indicated in bold green with a dagger (†), while the lowest score each week is indicated in italicized red with a double-dagger (‡).

Colour key

Winners
Runners-up
Third place
Bottom two or three
Withdrew from competition
Eliminated

Dancing on Ice (series 16) - Weekly scores
Couple	Pl.	Week								
Couple	Pl.	1	2	3	4	5	6	7	8	9
Ryan & Amani	1st	**26.5**†	—N/a	25.0	29.0	25.0	35.0	35.5+1=36.5	3+38.0=41.0	**40.0**† (Note: This couple finished in first place.)
Miles & Vanessa B.	2nd	—N/a	26.0	29.0	31.5	**35.5**†	**36.0**†	37.5	4+36.5=40.5‡	38.0‡ (Note: This couple finished in second place.)
Adele & Mark	3rd	—N/a	**27.5**†	29.0	30.0	31.5	**36.0**†	39.0+1=**40.0**†	2+39.0=41.0 (Note: This couple was in the bottom two or three, but was not eliminated.)	**40.0**† (Note: This couple finished in third place.)
Greg & Vanessa J.	4th	24.5	—N/a	28.5	30.5	31.5	35.0	38.0+1=39.0	5+36.5=**41.5**†	(Note: This couple withdrew from the competition.)
Amber & Simon	5th	25.0	—N/a	**31.0**†	**34.0**†	**35.5**†	33.0	38.0	1+40.0=41.0 (Note: This couple was eliminated.)	
Eddie & Vicky	6th	—N/a	**27.5**†	28.0	28.5	31.5	32.5	33.5‡		
Ricky N. & Annette	7th	—N/a	20.0	21.0	24.0	28.0	30.0‡			
Lou & Brendyn	8th	—N/a	19.5‡	22.0	24.5	26.5				
Roxy & Sylvain	9th	20.0	—N/a	24.0	26.0	24.5‡				
Claire & Colin	10th	—N/a	22.0	24.0	23.5‡					
Hannah & Andy	11th	19.5	—N/a	20.0‡						
Ricky H. & Robin	12th	12.5‡	—N/a							

== Weekly scores ==
=== Week 1 (14 January) ===
Group performances:

- "You Make Me Feel (Mighty Real)" — Sylvester
- "Shake It Out" — Florence and the Machine (performed by professional skaters)

Only half of the celebrities performed this week. Couples are listed in the order they performed.

Couple	Judges' scores				Total score	Music	Result
Couple	Banjo	Mabuse	Torvill	Dean	Total score	Music	Result
Greg & Vanessa J.	5.5	6.5	6.5	6.0	24.5	"Don't Stop Me Now" — Queen	Safe
Roxy & Sylvain	5.0	5.0	5.0	5.0	20.0	"You Don't Own Me" — Saygrace	Safe
Ricky H. & Robin	3.0	3.0	3.0	3.5	12.5	"Gonna Fly Now" — Bill Conti	Eliminated
Amber & Simon	6.5	6.5	6.0	6.0	25.0	"Hold On to Now" — Kylie Minogue	Safe
Hannah & Andy	5.0	6.0	4.0	4.5	19.5	"Break Free" — Ariana Grande	Safe
Ryan & Amani	6.5	7.0	6.5	6.5	26.5	"Sex on Fire" — Kings of Leon	Safe

=== Week 2 (21 January) ===
Group performance: "Land of a Thousand Dances" — Wilson Pickett
Torvill & Dean performance: "I Feel Like Dancing" — Jason Mraz

Only half of the celebrities performed this week. Couples are listed in the order they performed.

Couple	Judges' scores				Total score	Music	Result
Couple	Banjo	Mabuse	Torvill	Dean	Total score	Music	Result
Claire & Colin	5.5	5.5	5.5	5.5	22.0	"Holding Out for a Hero" — Bonnie Tyler	Safe
Miles & Vanessa B.	6.5	6.5	6.5	6.5	26.0	"Hard to Handle" — The Black Crowes	Safe
Adele & Mark	6.5	7.0	7.0	7.0	27.5	"Clearly" — Grace VanderWaal	Safe
Ricky N. & Annette	5.5	4.5	5.0	5.0	20.0	"Body Groove" — Architechs and Wyles	Safe
Lou & Brendyn	5.0	4.5	5.0	5.0	19.5	"Hung Up" — Madonna	Bottom two
Eddie & Vicky	7.0	7.0	6.5	7.0	27.5	"Livin' on a Prayer" — Bon Jovi	Safe

Save Me skates

- Ricky H. & Robin: "If I Can Dream" — Elvis Presley
- Lou & Brendyn: "Try" — Pink

Judges' votes to save

- Banjo: Lou & Brendyn
- Mabuse: Lou & Brendyn
- Dean: Lou & Brendyn
- Torvill: Did not vote, but would have voted to save Lou & Brendyn

=== Week 3 (28 January) ===
Theme: Movies
Musical guest: Ariana DeBose — "Electric Energy" (from Argylle)

Alex Crook replaced Sam Matterface as commentator. There was no skate-off this week. Instead, the couple with the lowest combined judges' score and public vote was eliminated. Couples are listed in the order they performed.

Couple	Judges' scores				Total score	Music	Film	Result
Couple	Banjo	Mabuse	Torvill	Dean	Total score	Music	Film	Result
Ryan & Amani	6.0	6.0	6.5	6.5	25.0	"Pure Imagination" — David Shannon	Willy Wonka & the Chocolate Factory	Safe
Roxy & Sylvain	6.0	5.5	6.0	6.5	24.0	"Jump in the Line" — Harry Belafonte	Beetlejuice	Safe
Hannah & Andy	5.5	5.5	4.5	4.5	20.0	"Let It Go" — Louise Dearman	Frozen	Eliminated
Greg & Vanessa J.	7.0	7.0	7.0	7.5	28.5	"You Never Can Tell" — Chuck Berry	Pulp Fiction	Safe
Claire & Colin	6.0	6.0	6.0	6.0	24.0	"Cruella de Vil" — Dr. John	One Hundred and One Dalmatians	Safe
Lou & Brendyn	5.5	5.5	5.5	5.5	22.0	"Hold On" — Wilson Phillips	Bridesmaids	Safe
Eddie & Vicky	7.0	7.0	7.0	7.0	28.0	"Soul Bossa Nova" — Quincy Jones	Austin Powers	Safe
Ricky N. & Annette	5.5	5.5	5.0	5.0	21.0	"Mr. Blue Sky" — ELO	Guardians of the Galaxy Vol. 2	Safe
Miles & Vanessa B.	7.0	7.0	7.5	7.5	29.0	"A Thousand Years" — Amanda Holden	The Twilight Saga: Breaking Dawn – Part 2	Safe
Adele & Mark	7.5	7.5	7.0	7.0	29.0	"Clubbed to Death" — Rob Dougan	The Matrix	Safe
Amber & Simon	7.5	7.5	8.0	8.0	31.0	"What Was I Made For?" — Billie Eilish	Barbie	Safe

=== Week 4 (4 February) ===
Theme: Dance
Musical guest: Shrek the Musical — "I'm a Believer" (with professional skaters)

Couples are listed in the order they performed.

Couple	Judges' scores				Total score	Music	Style	Result
Couple	Banjo	Mabuse	Torvill	Dean	Total score	Music	Style	Result
Adele & Mark	7.5	7.5	7.5	7.5	30.0	"Hit the Road Jack" — Throttle	Charleston	Safe
Miles & Vanessa B.	7.5	8.0	8.0	8.0	31.5	"Vois sur ton chemin" — Les choristes	Ballet	Safe
Lou & Brendyn	6.0	6.5	6.0	6.0	24.5	"What a Wonderful World" — Eva Cassidy	Waltz	Bottom two
Amber & Simon	8.5	8.5	8.5	8.5	34.0	"Sway" — Michael Bublé	Cha-cha-cha	Safe
Ricky N. & Annette	6.0	6.5	6.0	5.5	24.0	"Y.M.C.A. (Remix)" — Billy McIntyre & His All Star Ceilidh Band	Schuhplattler	Safe
Claire & Colin	6.0	6.0	6.0	5.5	23.5	"Big Spender" — Shirley Bassey	Burlesque	Eliminated
Ryan & Amani	7.0	7.5	7.0	7.5	29.0	"Jungle" — X Ambassadors	Tango	Safe
Eddie & Vicky	7.5	7.0	7.0	7.0	28.5	"Karma Chameleon" — Culture Club	Jive	Safe
Roxy & Sylvain	6.0	7.0	6.5	6.5	26.0	"Beautiful Liar" — Beyoncé & Shakira	Belly dance	Safe
Greg & Vanessa J.	7.5	7.5	7.5	8.0	30.5	"La Bomba" — Ricky Martin	Salsa	Safe

Save Me skates

- Lou & Brendyn: "Try" — Pink
- Claire & Colin: "Relight My Fire" — Dan Hartman

Judges' votes to save

- Banjo: Lou & Brendyn
- Mabuse: Lou & Brendyn
- Dean: Lou & Brendyn
- Torvill: Did not vote

=== Week 5 (11 February) ===
Theme: Musicals
Group performance: "You Can't Stop the Beat" (from Hairspray)
Guest performance: Johnny Weir — "Memory" (from Cats)
Musical guest: Marisha Wallace — "One Night Only" — (from Dreamgirls)

As Ashley Banjo was absent from the judging panel, Johnny Weir filled in this week as a guest judge.

Couples are listed in the order they performed.

Couple	Judges' scores				Total score	Music	Musical	Result
Couple	Weir	Mabuse	Torvill	Dean	Total score	Music	Musical	Result
Lou & Brendyn	6.5	6.5	6.5	7.0	26.5	"Six"	Six	Eliminated in skate-off
Eddie & Vicky	7.0	8.0	8.0	8.5	31.5	"The Phantom of the Opera"	The Phantom of the Opera	Safe
Ryan & Amani	5.5	6.5	6.5	6.5	25.0	"Sit Down, You're Rockin' the Boat"	Guys and Dolls	Safe
Ricky N. & Annette	7.0	7.0	7.0	7.0	28.0	"Sunset Boulevard"	Sunset Boulevard	Bottom three
Roxy & Sylvain	6.0	6.0	6.5	6.0	24.5	"Your Song"	Moulin Rouge!	Eliminated immediately
Amber & Simon	9.0	8.5	9.0	9.0	35.5	"Revolting Children"	Matilda the Musical	Safe
Adele & Mark	8.0	8.0	7.5	8.0	31.5	"Little Shop of Horrors"	Little Shop of Horrors	Safe
Greg & Vanessa J.	7.5	8.0	8.0	8.0	31.5	"On My Own"	Les Misérables	Safe
Miles & Vanessa B.	8.5	9.0	9.0	9.0	35.5	"Cum On Feel the Noize"	Rock of Ages	Safe

Save Me skates

- Lou & Brendyn: "Try" — Pink
- Ricky N. & Annette: "There's Nothing Holdin' Me Back" — Shawn Mendes

Judges' votes to save

- Weir: Ricky N. & Annette
- Mabuse: Ricky N. & Annette
- Torvill: Ricky N. & Annette
- Dean: Did not vote, but would have voted to save Ricky N. & Annette

=== Week 6 (18 February) ===
Theme: Personal
Group performance: Boléro — Maurice Ravel (performed by professional skaters)

As in the previous week, Johnny Weir filled in for Ashley Banjo due to the latter's touring commitments with Diversity.

Couple	Judges' scores				Total score	Music	Result
Couple	Weir	Mabuse	Torvill	Dean	Total score	Music	Result
Greg & Vanessa J.	9.0	9.0	8.5	8.5	35.0	"The Greatest Show" — Panic! at the Disco	Safe
Miles & Vanessa B.	8.5	8.5	9.5	9.5	36.0	"All Along the Watchtower" — Jimi Hendrix	Safe
Amber & Simon	8.5	8.5	8.0	8.0	33.0	"Mama" — Spice Girls	Bottom two
Ricky N. & Annette	7.5	7.5	7.5	7.5	30.0	"Three Little Birds" — Bob Marley and the Wailers	Eliminated
Adele & Mark	9.5	8.5	9.0	9.0	36.0	"Young Hearts Run Free" — Candi Staton	Safe
Eddie & Vicky	8.0	8.5	8.0	8.0	32.5	"Jump" — Van Halen	Safe
Ryan & Amani	8.0	9.0	9.0	9.0	35.0	"Easy" — Dougie James	Safe

Save Me skates

- Amber & Simon: "Power" — Little Mix
- Ricky N. & Annette: "There's Nothing Holdin' Me Back" — Shawn Mendes

Judges' votes to save

- Weir: Amber & Simon
- Mabuse: Amber & Simon
- Dean: Amber & Simon
- Torvill: Did not vote, but would have voted to save Amber & Simon

=== Week 7 (25 February) ===
Theme: Guilty Pleasures
Musical guest: Rod Stewart & Jools Holland — "Pennies from Heaven"

As in the previous two weeks, Johnny Weir filled in for Ashley Banjo.

After their individual performances, the couples were divided into two teams for a group performance. The couples on the winning team, as determined by the judges, had an additional point added to their final scores. Couples are listed in the order they performed.

- Team Miles (Amber & Simon; Eddie & Vicky; and Miles & Vanessa B.): "My Generation" — The Who
- Team Adele (Adele & Mark; Greg & Vanessa J.; and Ryan & Amani): "(I Can't Get No) Satisfaction" — The Rolling Stones

Couple	Judges' scores				Total score	Team skate	Final score	Music	Result
Couple	Weir	Mabuse	Torvill	Dean	Total score	Team skate	Final score	Music	Result
Eddie & Vicky	8.0	8.5	8.5	8.5	33.5	Lost	33.5	"What Makes You Beautiful" — One Direction	Eliminated
Miles & Vanessa B.	9.0	9.5	9.5	9.5	37.5	Lost	37.5	"Genie in a Bottle" — Christina Aguilera	Safe
Ryan & Amani	8.5	9.0	9.0	9.0	35.5	Won	36.5	"Club Tropicana" — Wham!	Safe
Greg & Vanessa J.	10.0	10.0	9.0	9.0	38.0	Won	39.0	"Bye Bye Bye" — NSYNC	Safe
Amber & Simon	9.5	9.5	9.5	9.5	38.0	Lost	38.0	"Waterloo" — ABBA	Bottom two
Adele & Mark	9.5	9.5	10.0	10.0	39.0	Won	40.0	"You're My World" — Jane McDonald	Safe

Save Me skates

- Eddie & Vicky: "Rocket Man" — Elton John
- Amber & Simon: "Power" — Little Mix

Judges' votes to save

- Weir: Amber & Simon
- Mabuse: Eddie & Vicky
- Torvill: Amber & Simon
- Dean: Amber & Simon

=== Week 8: Semi-final (3 March) ===
Theme: Solo skate
Musical guest: Priscilla the Party! — "I Will Survive"

Group performances:

- "Higher Love" — Kygo & Whitney Houston
- "Tattoo" — Loreen (performed by professional skaters)
- "Highway to Hell" — AC/DC (Solo Skate Battle)

Couples are listed in the order they performed.

Couple	Judges' scores				Total score	Solo Skate Battle	Music	Result
Couple	Banjo	Mabuse	Torvill	Dean	Total score	Solo Skate Battle	Music	Result
Miles & Vanessa B.	9.5	9.0	9.0	9.0	36.5	4 pts.	"Feeling Good" — Michael Bublé	Safe
Amber & Simon	10.0	10.0	10.0	10.0	40.0	1 pt.	"Wildest Dreams" — Taylor Swift	Eliminated
Ryan & Amani	9.5	9.5	9.5	9.5	38.0	3 pts.	"Ain't That a Kick in the Head?" — Robbie Williams	Safe
Greg & Vanessa J.	9.0	9.5	9.0	9.0	36.5	5 pts.	"A Sky Full of Stars" — Coldplay	Safe
Adele & Mark	10.0	10.0	9.5	9.5	39.0	2 pts.	"Rise Like a Phoenix" — Conchita Wurst	Bottom two

Save Me skates

- Amber & Simon: "Power" — Little Mix
- Adele & Mark: "Not Giving In" — Rudimental feat. John Newman & Alex Clare

Judges' votes to save

- Banjo: Adele & Mark
- Mabuse: Adele & Mark
- Dean: Adele & Mark
- Torvill: Did not vote, but would have voted to save Adele & Mark

=== Week 9: Final (10 March) ===
Theme: Showcase
Torvill & Dean performance: "Hold My Hand" — Lady Gaga

Group performances:

- "Heroes (We Could Be)" — Alesso, feat. Tove Lo (performed by professional skaters)
- "Good Times" — Ella Eyre (performed by Ashlie Slatter & Atl Ongay-Perez)

Greg Rutherford and Vanessa James withdrew from the competition before the finale after Rutherford suffered an injury that required hospitalization.

Couples are listed in the order they performed.

Couple	Judges' scores				Total score	Music	Result
Couple	Banjo	Mabuse	Torvill	Dean	Total score	Music	Result
Adele & Mark	10.0	10.0	10.0	10.0	40.0	"Texas Hold 'Em" — Beyoncé	Third place
Miles & Vanessa B.	9.5	9.5	9.5	9.5	38.0	"Turn to Stone" — Ingrid Michaelson	Runners-up
Ryan & Amani	10.0	10.0	10.0	10.0	40.0	"Believer" — Imagine Dragons	Winners

== Ratings ==
Official ratings are taken from BARB. Viewing figures are from 7 day data.

Episode	Date	Total viewers (millions)	Total weekly ranking
Live show 1	14 January	4.23	20
Live show 2	21 January	3.58	33
Live show 3	28 January	3.33	37
Live show 4	4 February	3.17	37
Live show 5	11 February	3.20	37
Live show 6	18 February	3.15	35
Live show 7	25 February	3.38	34
Live show 8	3 March	3.12	32
Live show 9	10 March	3.32	31
