= Dancing on Ice series 15 =

Fifteenth series of Dancing on Ice

Dancing on Ice
- Series 15
- Presented by: Phillip Schofield; Holly Willoughby
- Judges: Ashley Banjo; Christopher Dean; Oti Mabuse; Jayne Torvill
- Celebrity winner: Nile Wilson
- Professional winner: Olivia Smart
- No. of episodes: 9

Release
- Original network: ITV
- Original release: 15 January – 12 March 2023

Series chronology
- ← Previous; Series 14 Next → Series 16

The fifteenth series of Dancing on Ice debuted on ITV on 15 January 2023. During the finale of the fourteenth series, it was announced that Dancing on Ice had been renewed for another series. The series was once again filmed in the purpose-built studio at Bovingdon Airfield. Phillip Schofield and Holly Willoughby returned as hosts. Ashley Banjo, Christopher Dean, Oti Mabuse, and Jayne Torvill also returned as judges. This series decreased the number of live shows to nine weeks instead of ten, and featured one fewer celebrity contestant than usual.

For the first time in the show's history, Torvill and Dean were unable to perform the Boléro, as Torvill had ruptured her bicep in training and required surgery.

Olympic artistic gymnast Nile Wilson and Olivia Smart were announced as the winners on 12 March 2023. Nile Wilson was also the first male skater to ever perform the dangerous manoeuvre "the headbanger," which one skater is picked up by their ankle and spun around by their partner.

This was the final series to be presented by Schofield, following his departure from ITV just over two months after the series concluded in the aftermath of revelations over his personal life.

== Professional skaters ==
On 28 October 2022, the professional skaters returning from the previous series were announced as Matt Evers, Alexandra Schauman, Łukasz Różycki, Mark Hanretty, Vanessa Bauer, Brendyn Hatfield, and Tippy Packard, along with Colin Grafton who received a partner for the first time. Andy Buchanan, Robin Johnstone, Angela Egan, Joe Johnson, and reigning champion Karina Manta did not return. They were replaced by Sylvain Longchambon, who received a partner for the first time since the eleventh series, Klabera Komini, and Vicky Ogden, both of whom last appeared in the thirteenth series, as well as new skater Olivia Smart.

== Couples ==
On 3 October 2022, Patsy Palmer was announced as the first celebrity to be participating in the series. More celebrities continued to be revealed throughout the week before the line-up was concluded on 11 October. Due to the series being a week shorter than usual, only eleven couples competed.

Celebrity	Notability	Professional partner	Status
John Fashanu	England footballer & television presenter	Alexandra Schauman	Eliminated 1st on 22 January 2023
Michelle Heaton	Liberty X singer	Łukasz Różycki	Eliminated 2nd on 29 January 2023
Ekin-Su Cülcüloğlu	Love Island winner & actress	Brendyn Hatfield	Eliminated 3rd on 5 February 2023
Patsy Palmer	EastEnders actress & DJ	Matt Evers	Eliminated 4th on 12 February 2023
Darren Harriott	Stand-up comedian & presenter	Tippy Packard	Eliminated 5th on 19 February 2023
Carley Stenson	Hollyoaks actress & singer	Mark Hanretty	Eliminated 6th on 26 February 2023
Mollie Gallagher	Coronation Street actress	Sylvain Longchambon	Eliminated 7th & 8th on 5 March 2023
Siva Kaneswaran	The Wanted singer	Klabera Komini	Eliminated 7th & 8th on 5 March 2023
The Vivienne	Drag queen & RuPaul's Drag Race UK winner	Colin Grafton	Third place on 12 March 2023
Joey Essex	The Only Way Is Essex star	Vanessa Bauer	Runners-up on 12 March 2023
Nile Wilson	Olympic artistic gymnast	Olivia Smart	Winners on 12 March 2023

== Scoring chart ==
The highest score each week is indicated in bold green with a dagger (†), while the lowest score each week is indicated in italicized red with a double-dagger (‡).

Color key:

Winners
Runners-up
Third place
Bottom two or three
Excused from competition for the week
Eliminated

Dancing on Ice (series 15) - Weekly scores
Couple	Pl.	Week								
Couple	Pl.	1	2	3	4	5	6	7	8	9
Nile & Olivia	1st	**29.5**†	—N/a	**33.5**†	**34.0**†	**36.0**†	35.0	**37.5**†	5+40.0=**45.0**†	**40.0**† (Note: This couple finished in first place.)
Joey & Vanessa	2nd	27.0	—N/a	29.0	30.5	33.0	32.5	36.5	4+38.0=42.0 (Note: This couple was in the bottom two or three, but was not eliminated.)	**40.0**† (Note: This couple finished in second place.)
The Vivienne & Colin	3rd	—N/a	28.5	32.5	32.5	33.5	**36.0**†	35.5	1+39.5=40.5	**40.0**† (Note: This couple finished in third place.)
Siva & Klabera	4th	24.0	—N/a	26.5	30.0	(Note: This couple was excused from competition and was granted a bye to the following week.)	32.5	34.0	3+36.0=39.0 (Note: This couple was eliminated.)	
Mollie & Sylvain	4th	—N/a	26.5	28.5	26.0	30.5	30.0	33.0‡	2+34.0=36.0‡	
Carley & Mark	6th	—N/a	**32.0**†	32.5	32.5	34.0	**36.0**†	34.5		
Darren & Tippy	7th	—N/a	26.5	27.0	26.5	28.5	28.5‡			
Patsy & Matt	8th	21.0	—N/a	20.5	24.5	26.5‡				
Ekin-Su & Brendyn	9th	21.5	—N/a	23.0	23.0‡					
Michelle & Łukasz	10th	19.0‡	—N/a	20.0‡						
John & Alexandra	11th	—N/a	19.0‡							

== Weekly scores ==
=== Week 1 (15 January) ===
Group performances:

- "I Wanna Dance with Somebody (Who Loves Me) (David Solomon Remix)" — Whitney Houston & David Solomon
- "Never Tear Us Apart" — Paloma Faith (performed by professional skaters)

Only half of the celebrities performed this week. Couples are listed in the order they performed.

Couple	Judges' scores				Total score	Music	Result
Couple	Banjo	Mabuse	Torvill	Dean	Total score	Music	Result
Joey & Vanessa	7.0	7.0	6.5	6.5	27.0	"Mack the Knife" — Robbie Williams	Safe
Patsy & Matt	5.0	5.0	5.5	5.5	21.0	"Ride on Time" — Black Box	Safe
Siva & Klabera	6.0	6.0	6.0	6.0	24.0	"Rio" — Duran Duran	Safe
Ekin-Su & Brendyn	5.5	6.0	5.0	5.0	21.5	"Toxic" — Britney Spears	Bottom two
Michelle & Łukasz	5.5	4.5	4.5	4.5	19.0	"Waking Up Dreaming" — Shania Twain	Safe
Nile & Olivia	7.0	7.5	7.5	7.5	29.5	"Sign of the Times" — Harry Styles	Safe

=== Week 2 (22 January) ===
Group performance: "Dancin' Fool" — Barry Manilow
Torvill & Dean performance: "Higher" — Michael Bublé

Only half of the celebrities performed this week. Couples are listed in the order they performed.

Couple	Judges' scores				Total score	Music	Result
Couple	Banjo	Mabuse	Torvill	Dean	Total score	Music	Result
The Vivienne & Colin	7.0	7.0	7.0	7.5	28.5	"Strong Enough" — Cher	Safe
John & Alexandra	5.0	5.0	4.5	4.5	19.0	"Eat My Goal" — Collapsed Lung	Eliminated
Mollie & Sylvain	6.5	6.5	6.5	7.0	26.5	"Angeleyes" — ABBA	Safe
Darren & Tippy	6.5	6.5	6.5	7.0	26.5	"Fireball" —Pitbull, feat. John Ryan	Safe
Carley & Mark	8.0	8.0	8.0	8.0	32.0	"Say You Love Me" — Jessie Ware	Safe

Save Me skates

- Ekin-Su & Brendyn: "No Tears Left to Cry" — Ariana Grande
- John & Alexandra: "Spirit in the Sky" — Doctor and the Medics

Judges' votes to save

- Banjo: Ekin-Su & Brendyn
- Dean: Ekin-Su & Brendyn
- Mabuse: Ekin-Su & Brendyn
- Torvill: Did not need to vote, but would have voted to save Ekin-Su & Brendyn

=== Week 3 (29 January) ===
Theme: Musicals

There was no skate-off this week. Instead, the couple with the lowest combined judges' score and public vote was eliminated. Couples are listed in the order they performed.

Couple	Judges' scores				Total score	Music	Musical	Result
Couple	Banjo	Mabuse	Torvill	Dean	Total score	Music	Musical	Result
Nile & Olivia	8.5	8.0	8.5	8.5	33.5	"Chitty Chitty Bang Bang"	Chitty Chitty Bang Bang	Safe
Michelle & Łukasz	5.5	5.0	5.0	4.5	20.0	"All That Jazz"	Chicago	Eliminated
Siva & Klabera	6.5	7.0	6.5	6.5	26.5	"Bohemian Rhapsody"	We Will Rock You	Safe
Carley & Mark	8.0	8.0	8.0	8.5	32.5	"Anything Goes"	Anything Goes	Safe
The Vivienne & Colin	8.0	8.5	8.0	8.0	32.5	"Don't Cry for Me Argentina"	Evita	Safe
Darren & Tippy	6.5	7.0	6.5	7.0	27.0	"Fat Sam's Grand Slam"	Bugsy Malone	Safe
Ekin-Su & Brendyn	6.0	6.0	5.5	5.5	23.0	"Do-Re-Mi"	The Sound of Music	Safe
Mollie & Sylvain	7.0	7.5	7.0	7.0	28.5	"She Used to Be Mine"	Waitress	Safe
Patsy & Matt	5.0	4.5	5.5	5.5	20.5	"Defying Gravity"	Wicked	Safe
Joey & Vanessa	7.5	7.0	7.0	7.5	29.0	"You're the One That I Want"	Grease	Safe

=== Week 4 (5 February) ===
Theme: Dance
Guest performance: "Both Sides, Now" — Josh Groban, feat. Sara Bareilles (performed by Mark Hanretty & Olivia Smart)

Couples are listed in the order they performed.

Couple	Judges' scores				Total score	Music	Style	Result
Couple	Banjo	Mabuse	Torvill	Dean	Total score	Music	Style	Result
Carley & Mark	8.0	8.5	8.0	8.0	32.5	"Samba (Conga)" — Gloria Estefan	Samba	Safe
Mollie & Sylvain	6.5	6.5	6.5	6.5	26.0	"2 Be Loved (Am I Ready)" — Lizzo	Cheerleading	Safe
Darren & Tippy	7.0	7.0	6.0	6.5	26.5	"Making Your Mind Up" — Bucks Fizz	Swing	Safe
Siva & Klabera	7.5	7.5	7.5	7.5	30.0	"Three Times a Lady" — Commodores	Waltz	Safe
Ekin-Su & Brendyn	5.5	6.0	5.5	6.0	23.0	"Car Wash" — Dance X Winners	Disco	Eliminated
Joey & Vanessa	8.0	8.0	7.0	7.5	30.5	"Pushin' On" — 2WEI & Marvin Brooks	Paso doble	Safe
Patsy & Matt	6.0	6.5	6.5	5.5	24.5	"Time Warp" — Black Lace	Time Warp	Bottom two
Nile & Olivia	8.5	8.5	8.5	8.5	34.0	"Friday (Dopamine Re-Edit)" — Riton & Nightcrawlers, feat. Mufasa & Hypeman	Street	Safe
The Vivienne & Colin	8.0	8.5	8.0	8.0	32.5	"Jolene (Dumplin' Remix)" — Dolly Parton	Country	Safe

Save Me skates

- Ekin-Su & Brendyn: "No Tears Left to Cry" — Ariana Grande
- Patsy & Matt: "Never Forget You" — Noisettes

Judges' votes to save

- Banjo: Patsy & Matt
- Mabuse: Patsy & Matt
- Torvill: Patsy & Matt
- Dean: Did not need to vote, but would have voted to save Patsy & Matt

=== Week 5 (12 February) ===
Theme: Icons

Due to Siva Kaneswaran suffering from a chest infection, he & Klabera did not perform this week.

Couples are listed in the order they performed.

Couple	Judges' scores				Total score	Music	Result
Couple	Banjo	Mabuse	Torvill	Dean	Total score	Music	Result
Joey & Vanessa	8.0	8.5	8.0	8.5	33.0	"I'm Still Standing" — Elton John	Safe
Patsy & Matt	6.5	7.0	6.5	6.5	26.5	"Spice Up Your Life" — Spice Girls	Eliminated
Nile & Olivia	9.0	9.0	9.0	9.0	36.0	"Let Me Entertain You" — Robbie Williams	Safe
Darren & Tippy	7.0	7.5	7.0	7.0	28.5	"I'm Your Man" — Wham!	Bottom two
The Vivienne & Colin	8.0	8.5	8.5	8.5	33.5	"Halo" — Beyoncé	Safe
Carley & Mark	8.5	8.5	8.5	8.5	34.0	"Take Another Little Piece of My Heart" — Dusty Springfield	Safe
Mollie & Sylvain	7.5	7.5	7.5	8.0	30.5	"Happier Than Ever" — Billie Eilish	Safe

Save Me skates

- Patsy & Matt: "Never Forget You" — Noisettes
- Darren & Tippy: "Ain't Giving Up" — Craig David & Sigala

Judges' votes to save

- Banjo: Darren & Tippy
- Mabuse: Darren & Tippy
- Dean: Darren & Tippy
- Torvill: Did not need to vote, but would have voted to save Darren & Tippy

=== Week 6 (19 February) ===
Theme: Movies

Couples are listed in the order they performed.

Couple	Judges' scores				Total score	Music	Film	Result
Couple	Banjo	Mabuse	Torvill	Dean	Total score	Music	Film	Result
The Vivienne & Colin	9.0	9.0	9.0	9.0	36.0	"Supercalifragilisticexpialidocious"	Mary Poppins	Safe
Darren & Tippy	7.5	7.0	7.0	7.0	28.5	"Danger Zone"	Top Gun	Eliminated
Mollie & Sylvain	7.5	7.5	7.5	7.5	30.0	"Ghostbusters"	Ghostbusters	Safe
Joey & Vanessa	8.5	8.5	7.5	8.0	32.5	"Breaking Free"	High School Musical	Safe
Siva & Klabera	8.0	8.5	8.0	8.0	32.5	"A Little Less Conversation" — Elvis Presley vs. JXL	Ocean's Eleven	Bottom two
Carley & Mark	9.0	9.0	9.0	9.0	36.0	"You've Got a Friend in Me"	Toy Story	Safe
Nile & Olivia	9.0	9.0	8.5	8.5	35.0	"Theme from Mission: Impossible"	Mission: Impossible	Safe

Save Me skates

- Darren & Tippy: "Ain't Giving Up" — Craig David & Sigala
- Siva & Klabera: "Say You Won't Let Go" — James Arthur

Judges' votes to save

- Banjo: Siva & Klabera
- Mabuse: Siva & Klabera
- Torvill: Siva & Klabera
- Dean: Did not need to vote, but would have voted to save Siva & Klabera

=== Week 7 (26 February) ===
Theme: Prop week
Group performances: "I Hope I Get It" — from A Chorus Line & "Fame" — from Fame (performed by professional skaters)

Couples are listed in the order they performed.

Couple	Judges' scores				Total score	Music	Prop	Result
Couple	Banjo	Mabuse	Torvill	Dean	Total score	Music	Prop	Result
Mollie & Sylvain	8.0	8.5	8.0	8.5	33.0	"Come Fly with Me" — Frank Sinatra	Airport trolley	Safe
Carley & Mark	8.5	9.0	8.5	8.5	34.5	"Fever" — Beyoncé	Feather boa	Eliminated
The Vivienne & Colin	9.0	8.5	9.0	9.0	35.5	"Pump It" — Black Eyed Peas	Chequered flag	Safe
Nile & Olivia	9.0	9.5	9.5	9.5	37.5	"Bleeding Love" — Leona Lewis	Double bed	Safe
Joey & Vanessa	9.0	9.0	9.0	9.5	36.5	"Cake by the Ocean" — DNCE	Surfboard	Safe
Siva & Klabera	8.5	8.5	8.5	8.5	34.0	"Tomorrow" — Marisha Wallace	Oar	Bottom two

Save Me skates

- Carley & Mark: "Stop This Flame" — Celeste
- Siva & Klabera: "Say You Won't Let Go" — James Arthur

Judges' votes to save

- Banjo: Siva & Klabera
- Mabuse: Siva & Klabera
- Dean: Siva & Klabera
- Torvill: Did not need to vote, but would have voted to save Siva & Klabera

=== Week 8: Semifinals (5 March) ===
Theme: Solo skate
Group performances:

- "Music for a Sushi Restaurant" — Harry Styles (performed by professional skaters)
- "Live and Let Die" — Guns N' Roses (Solo Skate Battle)

Couples are listed in the order they performed.

Couple	Judges' scores				Total score	Solo Skate Battle	Music	Result
Couple	Banjo	Mabuse	Torvill	Dean	Total score	Solo Skate Battle	Music	Result
Nile & Olivia	10.0	10.0	10.0	10.0	40.0	5 pts.	"In My Blood" — Shawn Mendes	Safe
Mollie & Sylvain	8.5	8.5	8.5	8.5	34.0	2 pts.	"My Immortal (Band Version)" — Evanescence	Eliminated
Siva & Klabera	9.0	9.0	9.0	9.0	36.0	3 pts.	"Gold Forever (For Tom)" — The Wanted	Eliminated
The Vivienne & Colin	9.5	10.0	10.0	10.0	39.5	1 pt.	"Over the Rainbow" — Eva Cassidy	Safe
Joey & Vanessa	9.5	9.5	9.5	9.5	38.0	4 pts.	"High" — Lighthouse Family	Bottom three

Save Me skates

- Mollie & Sylvain: "Keeping Your Head Up" — Birdy
- Siva & Klabera: "Three Times a Lady" — Commodores
- Joey & Vanessa: "Power Over Me" — Dermot Kennedy

Judges' votes to save

- Banjo: Joey & Vanessa
- Mabuse: Joey & Vanessa
- Torvill: Joey & Vanessa
- Dean: Did not need to vote, but would have voted to save Joey & Vanessa

=== Week 9: Finale (12 March) ===
Group performances:

- "Celestial" — Ed Sheeran (performed by professional skaters)
- "Survivor" — 2WEI, feat. Edda Hayes (Skate Battle)

Couples are listed in the order they performed.

Couple	Judges' scores				Total score	Music	Result
Couple	Banjo	Mabuse	Torvill	Dean	Total score	Music	Result
Nile & Olivia	10.0	10.0	10.0	10.0	40.0	"He's a Pirate" — from Pirates of the Caribbean: The Curse of the Black Pearl	Winners
The Vivienne & Colin	10.0	10.0	10.0	10.0	40.0	"Dark Horse" — Katy Perry, feat. Juicy J	Third place
Joey & Vanessa	10.0	10.0	10.0	10.0	40.0	"Zero to Hero" — Ariana Grande	Runners-up

== Ratings ==
Official ratings are taken from BARB. Viewing figures are from 7 day data.

Episode	Date	Total viewers (millions)	ITV weekly ranking
Live show 1	15 January	4.62	6
Live show 2	22 January	3.97	11
Live show 3	29 January	4.18	11
Live show 4	5 February	3.79	12
Live show 5	12 February	3.65	12
Live show 6	19 February	3.91	11
Live show 7	26 February	3.84	11
Live show 8	5 March	3.58	11
Live show 9	12 March	3.82	14
