= Carmen Suite =

Carmen Suite may refer to:

- Carmen Suites (Bizet/Guiraud), two orchestral suites made by Ernest Guiraud from Georges Bizet's opera Carmen
- Carmen Suite (ballet), a one-act ballet to music by Rodion Shchedrin
