= Stephen Webb (TV personality) =

English television personality (born 1971)

- Born: Stephen Geoffrey Webb; 26 July 1971 (age 55); Sittingbourne, Kent, England
- Occupation: Television personality
- Years active: 2013–present
- Television: Gogglebox
- Spouse: Daniel Lustig (m. 2018; div. 2024)

Stephen Geoffrey Webb (born 26 July 1971) is an English television personality, known for appearing on Channel 4 programme Gogglebox between 2013 and 2023. He was set to appear as a contestant on the sixteenth series of Dancing on Ice, but was forced to withdraw prior to the series airing. He later went on to appear on the E4 series Celebs Go Dating.

== Life and career ==
Stephen Geoffrey Webb was born on 26 July 1971 in Sittingbourne, Kent. A hairdresser by trade, he trained with Toni & Guy and worked for the company for over fifteen years in various locations including London and Brighton, as well as Dubai.

In 2013, Webb became a cast member on the Channel 4 reality programme Gogglebox, alongside his friend and former partner Chris Steed. The pair also appeared as guests on the Christmas special episode of Alan Carr: Chatty Man in 2016. Steed announced his departure from Gogglebox in 2018 after a reported fall out with Webb, who remained on the programme and was instead joined by his mother Pat for the subsequent two series. In 2018, Webb married his partner Daniel Lustig whom he had been engaged to for two years, and Lustig subsequently began appearing alongside him on Gogglebox. They also co-own Lustig & Webb, their own hair salon in Hurstpierpoint. In September 2023, Webb announced his departure from Gogglebox after a decade on the show. In a statement alongside his partner Lustig, the couple issued a statement saying "[They felt] like the time [was] right to move on and explore new opportunities". The following month, Webb was announced as contestant on the sixteenth series of Dancing on Ice, due to begin airing in January 2024. However, later that month it was announced that he had been forced to withdraw from the competition prior to it starting after sustaining a broken ankle in training. In April 2024, Webb announced his divorce from Lustig after six years of marriage. Webb subsequently signed up to appear on the thirteenth series of the E4 series Celebs Go Dating.

== Filmography ==
As himself
Year	Title	Role	Ref.
2013–2023	Gogglebox	Cast member	
2016	Alan Carr: Chatty Man	Guest; 1 episode	
2024	Celebs Go Dating	Cast member; series 13	
