= Regan Gascoigne =

English media personality

- Born: Regan Paul Gascoigne; 18 February 1996 (age 29); Welwyn Garden City, Hertfordshire, England
- Occupations: Dancer; singer; actor
- Relatives: Paul Gascoigne (father); Sheryl Gascoigne (mother); Bianca Gascoigne (half-sister)

Regan Paul Gascoigne (born 18 February 1996) is an English professional dancer, singer and actor. He has worked in several performing arts productions and appeared on television shows. In 2022, he won the fourteenth series of Dancing on Ice.

== Life and career ==
Regan Paul Gascoigne was born on 18 February 1996. His parents are professional attacking midfielder footballer Paul and television personality Sheryl Gascoigne, and his half-sister is Bianca Gascoigne. Gascoigne has studied at the Hammond Ballet School, musical theatre at Tring Park School for the Performing Arts and The Actors Class London. Gascoigne is openly bisexual. He talked about his sexuality on Lorraine in 2019. He was supported by his father. Gascoigne, like his father Paul, has OCD. He is of Irish descent through his father.

When Gascoigne was young he appeared in shows with his father Paul. Gascoigne has been in Cutting Edge and on Being Paul Gascoigne about his father's alcoholism on This Morning. Gascoigne is a member of the Urban Voices Collective. He performed in The Nutcracker with the English National Ballet and has been part of the singing troupe on the ITV specials The Real Full Monty. Gascoigne also auditioned for The Greatest Dancer but did not progress.

Gascoigne won the 2022 season of Dancing on Ice with American skater Karina Manta. Ahead of his skating debut, Gascoigne was named by Ladbrokes as favourite to win the series which he went on to win beating fellow professional dancer Brendan Cole in the Final.
