= Dancing on Ice series 14 =

Fourteenth series of Dancing on Ice

Dancing on Ice
- Series 14
- Presented by: Phillip Schofield; Holly Willoughby
- Judges: Ashley Banjo; Christopher Dean; Oti Mabuse; Jayne Torvill
- Celebrity winner: Regan Gascoigne
- Professional winner: Karina Manta
- No. of episodes: 10

Release
- Original network: ITV
- Original release: 16 January – 27 March 2022

Series chronology
- ← Previous; Series 13 Next → Series 15

The fourteenth series of Dancing on Ice debuted on ITV on 16 January 2022. During the finale of the thirteenth series, it was announced that Dancing on Ice had been renewed for another series. The series was once again filmed in the purpose-built studio at Bovingdon Airfield. Phillip Schofield and Holly Willoughby returned as hosts. Ashley Banjo, Christopher Dean, and Jayne Torvill returned as judges for their fifth series, while it was announced on 3 October 2021, that John Barrowman would not be returning to the judging panel. In December, Strictly Come Dancing professional Oti Mabuse was confirmed as Barrowman's replacement. Arlene Phillips also joined the panel on 20 February as a guest judge.

Schofield tested positive for COVID-19 on 31 January and was unable to present the live show on 6 February. Stephen Mulhern therefore stepped in as co-host instead. Alex Crook also replaced Sam Matterface as commentator for the same show, due to the latter commentating at the 2021–22 FA Cup Liverpool v Cardiff City match. Willoughby tested positive for COVID-19 on 13 March and was unable to present that evening's show. Schofield therefore presented the semifinal episode on his own.

The series finale was postponed by a week due to the 2021–22 FA Cup Nottingham Forest v Liverpool quarterfinals match, which took place on 20 March. The finale aired on 27 March, with Regan Gascoigne and Karina Manta announced as the winners.

== Professional skaters ==
On 26 October 2021, it was announced that Hamish Gaman, Klabera Komini, and Vicky Ogden would not be returning for the fourteenth series. Gaman revealed via social media that he had been fired from the series due to producers wanting to "freshen the lineup" of skaters. They were replaced by three new professionals: Colin Grafton, Morgan Swales, and Tippy Packard.

== Couples ==
On 4 October 2021, Sally Dynevor and Bez were announced as the first two celebrities to be participating in the series. More celebrities were revealed throughout the following days before the full line-up was announced on 12 October.

Celebrity	Notability	Professional partner	Status
Ben Foden	England rugby player	Robin Johnstone	Eliminated 1st on 23 January 2022
Ria Hebden	Television presenter	Łukasz Różycki	Eliminated 2nd on 30 January 2022
Rachel Stevens	S Club 7 singer	Brendyn Hatfield	Eliminated 3rd on 6 February 2022
Liberty Poole	Love Island contestant	Joe Johnson	Eliminated 4th on 13 February 2022
Bez	Happy Mondays musician & dancer	Angela Egan	Eliminated 5th on 20 February 2022
Sally Dynevor	Coronation Street actress	Matt Evers	Eliminated 6th on 27 February 2022
Stef Reid	Paralympic athlete	Andy Buchanan	Eliminated 7th on 6 March 2022
Kye Whyte	Olympic cyclist	Tippy Packard	Eliminated 8th & 9th on 13 March 2022
Connor Ball	The Vamps bassist	Alexandra Schauman	Eliminated 8th & 9th on 13 March 2022
Kimberly Wyatt	The Pussycat Dolls singer	Mark Hanretty	Third place on 27 March 2022
Brendan Cole	Strictly Come Dancing professional	Vanessa Bauer; Brendyn Hatfield (Week 6)	Runners-up on 27 March 2022
Regan Gascoigne	Professional dancer	Karina Manta	Winners on 27 March 2022

== Scoring chart ==
The highest score each week is indicated in bold green with a dagger (†), while the lowest score each week is indicated in italicized red with a double-dagger (‡).

Color key:

Winners
Runners-up
Third place
Bottom two or three
Excused from competition for the week
Eliminated

Dancing on Ice (series 14) - Weekly scores
Couple	Pl.	Week									
Couple	Pl.	1	2	3	4	5	6 (Note: The couples were scored on a 50-point scale due to the presence of a guest judge.)	7	8	9	10
Regan & Karina	1st	—N/a	**33.0**†	33.5	35.5	**36.5**†	45.0	36.0	**40.0**†	4+40.0=44.0	40.0+40.0=**80.0**† (Note: This couple finished in first place.)
Brendan & Vanessa	2nd	**30.5**†	—N/a	33.5	35.5	34.0	47.0	**40.0**†	**40.0**†	2+39.0=41.0	40.0+40.0=**80.0**† (Note: This couple finished in second place.)
Kimberly & Mark	3rd	30.0	—N/a	**34.0**†	**37.5**†	**36.5**†	**47.5**†	38.5	**40.0**†	5+40.0=**45.0**† (Note: This couple was in the bottom two or three, but was not eliminated.)	40.0+40.0=**80.0**† (Note: This couple finished in third place.)
Connor & Alexandra	4th	—N/a	29.0	30.0	33.0	32.0	40.5	34.0	35.0‡	3+38.0=41.0 (Note: This couple was eliminated.)	
Kye & Tippy	4th	24.0	—N/a	(Note: This couple was excused from competition and was granted a bye to the following week.)	30.0	28.5	43.0	34.5	37.0	1+36.0=37.0‡	
Stef & Andy	6th	—N/a	24.0	26.5	29.5	34.0	41.5	36.0	36.5		
Sally & Matt	7th	23.0	—N/a	26.0	24.5	26.5	31.5	25.5‡			
Bez & Angela	8th	12.5‡	—N/a	18.0‡	20.0‡	19.5‡	22.5‡				
Liberty & Joe	9th	—N/a	26.0	27.0	27.5	28.0					
Rachel & Brendyn	10th	—N/a		26.5	25.0						
Ria & Łukasz	11th	24.5	—N/a	26.0							
Ben & Robin	12th	—N/a	23.0‡								

== Weekly scores ==
=== Week 1 (16 January) ===
Group performances:

- "Rhythm Is a Dancer" — Alex Christensen & The Berlin Orchestra, feat. Ivy Quainoo (performed by professional skaters)
- "Warriors" — Imagine Dragons (performed by professional skaters)

Only half of the celebrities performed this week. Couples are listed in the order they performed.

Couple	Judges' scores				Total score	Music	Result
Couple	Banjo	Mabuse	Torvill	Dean	Total score	Music	Result
Brendan & Vanessa	7.5	8.0	7.5	7.5	30.5	"Black Betty" — Ram Jam	Safe
Sally & Matt	5.5	6.5	5.5	5.5	23.0	"She's Always a Woman" — Billy Joel	Safe
Kye & Tippy	6.0	5.5	6.0	6.5	24.0	"Bonkers" — Dizzee Rascal & Armand van Helden	Safe
Bez & Angela	3.0	3.5	3.0	3.0	12.5	"Step On" — Happy Mondays	Safe
Ria & Łukasz	6.0	6.0	6.5	6.0	24.5	"Treat People with Kindness" — Harry Styles	Bottom two
Kimberly & Mark	7.5	8.0	7.0	7.5	30.0	"What About Us" — Pink	Safe

=== Week 2 (23 January) ===
Group performance: "Higher Power" — Coldplay (performed by professional skaters)
Torvill & Dean performance: "Lucy in the Sky with Diamonds" — Elton John

Only half of the celebrities performed this week. Couples are listed in the order they performed.

Rachel & Brendyn didn't perform this week after Rachel Stevens sustained a wrist fracture during practice.

Couple	Judges' scores				Total score	Music	Result
Couple	Banjo	Mabuse	Torvill	Dean	Total score	Music	Result
Ben & Robin	6.0	6.0	5.5	5.5	23.0	"Livin' la Vida Loca" — Ricky Martin	Eliminated
Connor & Alexandra	7.0	7.5	7.0	7.5	29.0	"Paint It Black" — The Rolling Stones	Safe
Stef & Andy	6.0	6.0	6.0	6.0	24.0	"You Know Me" — Robbie Williams	Safe
Liberty & Joe	6.5	6.5	6.5	6.5	26.0	"Shout Out to My Ex" — Little Mix	Safe
Regan & Karina	8.0	8.0	8.5	8.5	33.0	"Too Good at Goodbyes" — Sam Smith	Safe

Save Me skates

- Ria & Łukasz: "Me!" — Taylor Swift, featuring Brendon Urie
- Ben & Robin: "You Know Me" — Robbie Williams

Judges' votes to save

- Banjo: Ria & Łukasz
- Mabuse: Ria & Łukasz
- Dean: Ria & Łukasz
- Torvill: Did not vote, but would have voted to save Ria & Łukasz

=== Week 3 (30 January) ===
Theme: Movies

Kye & Tippy didn't perform this week because Kye Whyte sustained a knee sprain during practice. Couples are listed in the order they performed.

Couple	Judges' scores				Total score	Music	Film	Result
Couple	Banjo	Mabuse	Torvill	Dean	Total score	Music	Film	Result
Kimberly & Mark	8.5	8.5	8.5	8.5	34.0	"The Greatest Show"	The Greatest Showman	Safe
Liberty & Joe	6.5	7.0	7.0	6.5	27.0	"I Like to Move It"	Madagascar	Safe
Connor & Alexandra	7.5	7.5	7.5	7.5	30.0	"Footloose"	Footloose	Safe
Stef & Andy	6.5	7.0	6.5	6.5	26.5	"(I've Had) The Time of My Life"	Dirty Dancing	Safe
Rachel & Brendyn	6.5	6.5	6.5	7.0	26.5	"Lady Marmalade"	Moulin Rouge!	Bottom two
Sally & Matt	6.0	7.0	6.5	6.5	26.0	"The Trolley Song"	Meet Me in St. Louis	Safe
Ria & Łukasz	6.5	6.5	6.5	6.5	26.0	"Into the Unknown"	Frozen II	Eliminated
Regan & Karina	8.5	8.0	8.5	8.5	33.5	"Singin' in the Rain"	Singin' in the Rain	Safe
Bez & Angela	4.5	4.5	4.5	4.5	18.0	"The Raiders March"	Raiders of the Lost Ark	Safe
Brendan & Vanessa	9.0	8.5	8.0	8.0	33.5	"Shallow"	A Star Is Born	Safe

Save Me skates

- Rachel & Brendyn: "Need You Now" — Lady A
- Ria & Łukasz: "Me!" — Taylor Swift, featuring Brendon Urie

Judges' votes to save

- Banjo: Rachel & Brendyn
- Mabuse: Rachel & Brendyn
- Torvill: Rachel & Brendyn
- Dean: Did not vote, but would have voted to save Rachel & Brendyn

=== Week 4 (6 February) ===
Theme: Dance
Performance: "Alone" — Jessie Ware (performed by Łukasz Różycki and Alexandra Schauman, in tribute to Sean Rice.)

Since Phillip Schofield tested positive for COVID-19, Stephen Mulhern filled in as host this week, while Alex Crook replaced Sam Matterface as commentator. Couples are listed in the order they performed.

Connor & Alexandra were due to go on 1st.

Couple	Judges' scores				Total score	Music	Style	Result
Couple	Banjo	Mabuse	Torvill	Dean	Total score	Music	Style	Result
Rachel & Brendyn	6.5	6.5	6.0	6.0	25.0	"If I Ain't Got You" — Alicia Keys	Waltz	Eliminated
Sally & Matt	6.0	6.5	6.0	6.0	24.5	"Build Me Up Buttercup" — The Foundations	Foxtrot	Safe
Regan & Karina	8.5	9.0	9.0	9.0	35.5	"Reggaetón Lento (Remix)" — CNCO & Little Mix	Reggaeton	Safe
Stef & Andy	7.5	8.0	7.0	7.0	29.5	"Bad Romance" — Lady Gaga	Medieval	Safe
Kye & Tippy	7.5	7.5	7.5	7.5	30.0	"Rasputin" — Majestic x Boney M.	Disco	Bottom two
Liberty & Joe	7.5	7.0	6.5	6.5	27.5	"Vogue" — Madonna	Vogue	Safe
Brendan & Vanessa	9.0	8.5	9.0	9.0	35.5	"Sing, Sing, Sing (Part II)" — from Fosse	Fosse	Safe
Connor & Alexandra	8.0	8.0	8.5	8.5	33.0	"Out of Our Heads" — Take That	Charleston	Safe
Bez & Angela	5.5	4.5	5.0	5.0	20.0	"I'm on My Way" — The Proclaimers	Highland Fling	Safe
Kimberly & Mark	9.0	9.5	9.5	9.5	37.5	"Santa María (del Buen Ayre)" — Gotan Project	Argentine tango	Safe

Save Me skates

- Rachel & Brendyn: "Need You Now" — Lady A
- Kye & Tippy: "Sanctify" — Years & Years

Judges' votes to save

- Banjo: Kye & Tippy
- Mabuse: Kye & Tippy
- Dean: Kye & Tippy
- Torvill: Did not vote, but would have voted to save Kye & Tippy

=== Week 5 (13 February) ===
Theme: Favourite things
Torvill & Dean performance: "Come Dance with Me" — Frank Sinatra

Couples are listed in the order they performed.

Couple	Judges' scores				Total score	Music	Result
Couple	Banjo	Mabuse	Torvill	Dean	Total score	Music	Result
Brendan & Vanessa	8.0	8.5	9.0	8.5	34.0	"House of Fun" — Madness	Safe
Kye & Tippy	7.0	7.0	7.0	7.5	28.5	"Supermassive Black Hole" — Muse	Bottom two
Sally & Matt	6.5	7.0	6.5	6.5	26.5	"Faith" — George Michael	Safe
Kimberly & Mark	9.0	9.5	9.0	9.0	36.5	"Bad Guy" — Billie Eilish	Safe
Liberty & Joe	7.0	7.0	7.0	7.0	28.0	"Right Round" — Flo Rida, feat. Kesha	Eliminated
Stef & Andy	8.5	8.5	8.5	8.5	34.0	"Kissing You" — Des'ree	Safe
Bez & Angela	5.0	4.5	5.0	5.0	19.5	"Walking on Sunshine" — Katrina and the Waves	Safe
Regan & Karina	9.0	9.0	9.5	9.0	36.5	"Shivers" — Ed Sheeran	Safe
Connor & Alexandra	8.0	8.0	8.0	8.0	32.0	"Vertigo" — U2	Safe

Save Me skates

- Kye & Tippy: "Sanctify" — Years & Years
- Liberty & Joe: "Stronger" — Britney Spears

Judges' votes to save

- Banjo: Kye & Tippy
- Mabuse: Liberty & Joe
- Torvill: Kye & Tippy
- Dean: Kye & Tippy

=== Week 6 (20 February) ===
Theme: Musicals
Group performance: "One Night Only" — from Dreamgirls

Arlene Phillips served as a guest judge this week.

Due to Vanessa Bauer testing positive for COVID-19, Brendan Cole performed with Brendyn Hatfield this week. Couples are listed in the order they performed.

Couple	Judges' scores					Total score	Music	Musical	Result
Couple	Banjo	Mabuse	Phillips	Torvill	Dean	Total score	Music	Musical	Result
Regan & Karina	9.0	9.0	9.0	9.0	9.0	45.0	"You Can't Stop the Beat"	Hairspray	Safe
Kimberly & Mark	9.5	9.5	9.5	9.5	9.5	47.5	"Don't Rain on My Parade"	Funny Girl	Safe
Stef & Andy	8.5	8.5	7.5	8.5	8.5	41.5	"One (Reprise)/Finale"	A Chorus Line	Safe
Bez & Angela	4.5	4.0	4.0	5.0	5.0	22.5	"Bat Out of Hell"	Bat Out of Hell: The Musical	Eliminated
Kye & Tippy	8.5	8.5	8.0	9.0	9.0	43.0	"Consider Yourself"	Oliver!	Safe
Sally & Matt	6.5	6.5	5.0	6.5	7.0	31.5	"My Favourite Things"	The Sound of Music	Bottom two
Connor & Alexandra	8.0	8.0	8.5	8.0	8.0	40.5	"Stars"	Les Misérables	Safe
Brendan & Brendyn	9.0	9.0	10.0	9.5	9.5	47.0	"Beggin'"	Jersey Boys	Safe

Save Me skates

- Bez & Angela: "Step On" — Happy Mondays
- Sally & Matt: "We've Only Just Begun" — The Carpenters

Judges' votes to save

- Banjo: Sally & Matt
- Mabuse: Sally & Matt
- Phillips: Sally & Matt
- Dean: Did not vote, but would have voted to save Sally & Matt
- Torvill: Did not vote, but would have voted to save Sally & Matt

=== Week 7 (27 February) ===
Theme: Prop week
Group performance: "Touch" — Little Mix & "Move Your Body" — Sia (performed by professional skaters and Oti Mabuse)

Couples are listed in the order they performed.

Couple	Judges' scores				Total score	Music	Prop	Result
Couple	Banjo	Mabuse	Torvill	Dean	Total score	Music	Prop	Result
Regan & Karina	9.0	9.0	9.0	9.0	36.0	"Can't Hold Us" — Macklemore & Ryan Lewis, feat. Ray Dalton	Baseball bat	Safe
Stef & Andy	9.0	9.0	9.0	9.0	36.0	"Material Girl" — Madonna	Clothes rail	Safe
Sally & Matt	6.5	6.5	6.5	6.0	25.5	"You Make Me Feel (Mighty Real)" — Sylvester	Salon chair	Eliminated
Kimberly & Mark	9.5	9.5	9.5	10.0	38.5	"Easy on Me" — Adele	Silk scarf	Safe
Kye & Tippy	8.5	8.5	8.5	9.0	34.5	"Mess Around" — Ray Charles	School desk	Bottom two
Connor & Alexandra	8.5	8.5	8.5	8.5	34.0	"Paradise" — George Ezra	Mop & bucket	Safe
Brendan & Vanessa	10.0	10.0	10.0	10.0	40.0	"Falling" — Harry Styles	Umbrella	Safe

Save Me skates

- Sally & Matt: "We've Only Just Begun" — The Carpenters
- Kye & Tippy: "Sanctify" — Years & Years

Judges' votes to save

- Banjo: Kye & Tippy
- Mabuse: Kye & Tippy
- Torvill: Kye & Tippy
- Dean: Did not vote, but would have voted to save Kye & Tippy

=== Week 8 (6 March) ===
Theme: Torvill and Dean
Group performances:

- "Greatest Day" — Take That
- "I Was Made for Lovin' You" & "Rock and Roll All Nite" — Kiss (performed by Lilah Fear & Lewis Gibson)

Couples are listed in the order they performed.

Couple	Judges' scores				Total score	Music	Result
Couple	Banjo	Mabuse	Torvill	Dean	Total score	Music	Result
Brendan & Vanessa	10.0	10.0	10.0	10.0	40.0	"Let's Face the Music and Dance" — Frank Sinatra	Safe
Kye & Tippy	9.0	9.0	9.5	9.5	37.0	"At the Hop" — Danny & the Juniors	Bottom two
Connor & Alexandra	8.5	8.5	9.0	9.0	35.0	"Cecilia" — Simon & Garfunkel	Safe
Stef & Andy	9.5	9.5	8.5	9.0	36.5	"Mack and Mabel" — Donald Pippin & Orchestra	Eliminated
Kimberly & Mark	10.0	10.0	10.0	10.0	40.0	"Puttin' On the Ritz" — Robbie Williams	Safe
Regan & Karina	10.0	10.0	10.0	10.0	40.0	"Barnum" — Cy Coleman & Michael Reed Orchestra	Safe

Save Me skates

- Kye & Tippy: "Sanctify" — Years & Years
- Stef & Andy: "How Am I Supposed to Live Without You" — Michael Bolton

Judges' votes to save

- Banjo: Kye & Tippy
- Mabuse: Kye & Tippy
- Dean: Kye & Tippy
- Torvill: Did not vote, but would have voted to save Kye & Tippy

=== Week 9: Semifinals (13 March) ===
Theme: Solo skate
Group performances:

- "Don't Go Yet" — Camila Cabello (performed by professional skaters)
- "Heroes" — Zayde Wølf (Solo Skate Battle)

Since Holly Willoughby tested positive for COVID-19, Phillip Schofield hosted on his own. Couples are listed in the order they performed.

Couple	Judges' scores				Total score	Solo Skate Battle	Music	Result
Couple	Banjo	Mabuse	Torvill	Dean	Total score	Solo Skate Battle	Music	Result
Brendan & Vanessa	10.0	10.0	9.5	9.5	39.0	2 pts.	"She" — Elvis Costello	Safe
Kye & Tippy	9.0	9.0	9.0	9.0	36.0	1 pt.	"Stand by Me" — Ben E. King	Eliminated
Kimberly & Mark	10.0	10.0	10.0	10.0	40.0	5 pts.	"We Found Love" — Rihanna, feat. Calvin Harris	Bottom three
Connor & Alexandra	9.5	9.5	9.5	9.5	38.0	3 pts.	"Boys Will Cry" — The Lunar Year	Eliminated
Regan & Karina	10.0	10.0	10.0	10.0	40.0	4 pts.	"I Have Nothing" — Whitney Houston	Safe

Save Me skates

- Connor & Alexandra: "Stop Crying Your Heart Out" — Oasis
- Kimberly & Mark: "Lost Without You" — Freya Ridings
- Kye & Tippy: "At the Hop" — Danny & the Juniors

Judges' votes to save

- Banjo: Kimberly & Mark
- Mabuse: Kimberly & Mark
- Torvill: Kimberly & Mark
- Dean: Did not vote, but would have voted to save Kimberly & Mark

=== Week 10: Finale (27 March) ===
Group performance: "I Lived" — OneRepublic
Torvill & Dean performance: "Gold Forever" — The Wanted (with professional skaters)

Each couple performed two routines. Couples are listed in the order they performed.

Couple	Order	Judges' scores				Total score	Music	Public vote	Pts.	Boléro	Pts.	Result
Couple	Order	Banjo	Mabuse	Torvill	Dean	Total score	Music	Public vote	Pts.	Boléro	Pts.	Result
Regan & Karina	1	10.0	10.0	10.0	10.0	80.0	"Step in Time" — from Mary Poppins	46%	3	62%	2	Winners
Regan & Karina	5	10.0	10.0	10.0	10.0	80.0	"Barnum" — Cy Coleman & Michael Reed Orchestra	46%	3	62%	2	Winners
Kimberly & Mark	2	10.0	10.0	10.0	10.0	80.0	"River" — Joni Mitchell	25%	1	—N/a		Third place
Kimberly & Mark	4	10.0	10.0	10.0	10.0	80.0	"Santa María (del Buen Ayre)" — Gotan Project	25%	1	—N/a		Third place
Brendan & Vanessa	3	10.0	10.0	10.0	10.0	80.0	Carmen Suites: No. 1 (Aragonaise), No. 2 (Habanera) & No. 1 (Les Toréadors) — Georges Bizet	29%	2	38%	1	Runners-up
Brendan & Vanessa	6	10.0	10.0	10.0	10.0	80.0	"Falling" — Harry Styles	29%	2	38%	1	Runners-up

== Ratings ==
Official ratings are taken from BARB. Viewing figures are from 7 day data.

Episode	Date	Total viewers (millions)	Total weekly ranking
Live show 1	16 January	5.03	23
Live show 2	23 January	4.82	23
Live show 3	30 January	4.41	31
Live show 4	6 February	4.20	36
Live show 5	13 February	4.47	28
Live show 6	20 February	3.97	36
Live show 7	27 February	4.10	33
Live show 8	6 March	4.18	23
Live show 9	13 March	3.92	28
Live show 10	27 March	3.93	20
