= Liberty Poole =

English television personality (born 1999)

- Born: Liberty Amor Poole; 2 September 1999 (age 26); Birmingham, West Midlands, England
- Occupation: Television personality
- Television: Love Island; Dancing on Ice; Love Island Games

Liberty Amor Poole (born 2 September 1999) is an English television personality. In 2021, she appeared on the seventh series of Love Island, and in 2022, she competed on the fourteenth series of Dancing on Ice. She has since appeared on Love Island spin-off show Love Island Games (2023) and Love Island: All-Stars (2024).

== Life and career ==
Poole was born on 2 September 1999 in Birmingham, England. Poole had considered becoming a doctor and started her education to do so, but quickly realised it was not for her. She then switched to studying marketing at Birmingham City University, which she preferred. Alongside her studies, Poole worked at Nando's.

In June 2021, Poole became a contestant on the seventh series of Love Island. She coupled up with Jake Cornish on the first day; they split up four days before the final and decided to walk from the series on 20 August 2021, before announcing their split to the rest of the cast. and the pair remained civil. Since leaving Love Island, Poole has shown no interest in watching it back but admits to having enjoyed her experience. Poole and some of her Love Island co-stars presented the award for Newcomer at the 26th National Television Awards. Later that month, she was announced at the new brand ambassador for fashion label InTheStyle in a deal worth £1 million. In October 2021, Poole has also had brand deals with Skinny Tan and Boux Avenue.

In January 2022, Poole began competing on the fourteenth series of Dancing on Ice. She was announced to be competing in October 2021. She was the fourth contestant eliminated, placing ninth. In November 2023, Poole was a contestant on the first season of the Love Island Games. In 2024, Poole appeared as a contestant on the spin-off Love Island: All-Stars. In January 2026, she was featured on Sky News after her car crashed into her neighbour's garden during Storm Goretti.

== Filmography ==
As herself
Year	Title	Role	Notes	Ref.
2021	Love Island	Contestant	Series 7	
2021	Love Island: Aftersun	Guest		
2021	This Morning	Guest		
2021	26th National Television Awards	Award co-presenter	For one award	
2022	Dancing on Ice	Contestant	Series 14	
2023	Love Island Games	Contestant	Series 1	
2024	Love Island: All-Stars	Contestant	Spin-off	
2026	Sky News	Herself	Guest	
