= Karina Manta =

American ice dancer (born 1996)

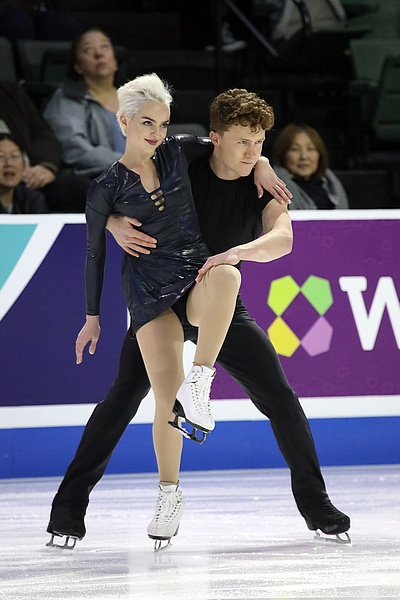
- Manta and Joseph Johnson in 2018

Personal information
- Born: March 20, 1996 (age 30) Olympia, Washington, U.S.
- Home town: Colorado Springs, Colorado, U.S.
- Height: 5 ft 3 in (1.60 m)

Figure skating career
- Country: United States
- Discipline: Ice dance
- Began skating: 2002
- Retired: April 18, 2019

Karina Manta (born March 20, 1996) is an American former competitive ice dancer.

== Early life ==
Manta was born on March 20, 1996, in Olympia, Washington. She began figure skating in 2002.

== Career ==
Manta previously competed in ice dance with Jonathan Thompson. Manta has partnered with ice dancer Joseph Johnson since 2013. The team is coached by Patti Gottwein in Colorado Springs. Manta and Johnson received their first Grand Prix assignment in 2018, competing at Skate America. They finished in 10th place with a total score of 139.33.

On April 18, 2019, Manta announced that she was stepping away from competitive figure skating. She and Johnson plan to move to Montreal in June and join Cirque du Soleil.

In 2020, it was announced that Manta would join the cast of ITV's Dancing On Ice. During the thirteenth series, she was a replacement partner for Graham Bell, whose original partner, fellow newcomer Yebin Mok, was injured during training. Bell and Manta were voted off during Week 3. Manta won the fourteenth series with Regan Gascoigne.

In 2021, Manta's memoir "On Top Of Glass" was published by Penguin Random House. The book is aimed at young adult readers.

As of February 2026, Manta and Johnson coach figure skaters at Chelsea Piers Sky Rink in New York City.

== Personal life ==
In 2018, Manta was a college student. In 2018, she came out as bisexual in a video accompanied by her girlfriend. This made her the first female figure skater competing on behalf of Team USA to come out.

== Programs ==
Season	Short program	Free skating
2018–2019	Malagueña by Ernesto Lecuona; Alcoba Azul by Elliot Goldenthal choreo. by Trina Pratt, Ben Agosto	Sweet Dreams by Eurythmics performed by Emily Browning; Sweet Dreams (are Made of This) by Eurythmics performed by Dave Stewart & His Fabulous Orchestra choreo. by Christopher Dean
2017–2018	Right Now by Pussycat Dolls; Fireball by Pitbull	Your Song; One Day I'll Fly Away by Elton John, Tony Phillips performed by Ewan McGregor, Nicole Kidman
2016–2017	Dream a Little Dream; I Wanna Be Like You by Robbie Williams	Dream On by Aerosmith
2015–2016	March: The Love for Three Oranges; Waltz: Cinderella by Sergei Prokofiev	Maple Leaf Rag; Bethana; The Entertainer by Scott Joplin

== Competitive Highlights ==
GP: Grand Prix; CS: Challenger Series

(with Joe Johnson)

International
Event	14–15	15–16	16–17	17–18	18–19
GP Skate America					10th
CS Autumn Classic		3rd			
CS Nebelhorn				14th	
CS US Classic			5th		5th
Lake Placid IDI			6th	5th	
National
U.S. Champ.	10th J	7th	8th	9th	7th
TBD = Assigned; WD = Withdrew
