= Carmen Suites (Bizet/Guiraud) =

Suites of orchestral music

The Carmen Suites are two suites of orchestral music drawn from the music of Georges Bizet's 1875 opera Carmen and compiled posthumously by his friend Ernest Guiraud. They adhere very closely to Bizet's orchestration. However the order of the musical allusions are in reversed chronological order, and do not adhere to the operatic versions entirely, although the Suite is directly inspired by Bizet's opera.

Guiraud also wrote the recitatives for Carmen, and compiled the second of the two suites from Bizet's L'Arlésienne incidental music.

Each of the Carmen Suites contains six numbers. Both suites have been performed and recorded many times.

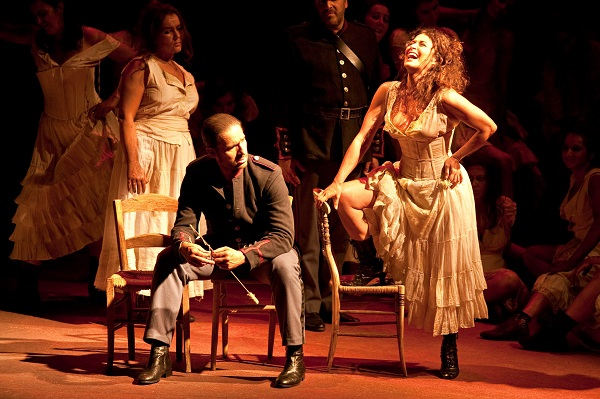
Carmen - Paris Opéra Comique production (2009)

== Carmen Suite No. 1 ==
- Prélude (A minor) – Act I, prelude (fate motive)
- Aragonaise (D minor) – Interlude (entr'acte) before act 4
- Intermezzo (E♭ major) – Interlude (entr'acte) before act 3
- Séguedille (B minor) – Act 1, Carmen: "Près des remparts de Séville"
- Les Dragons d'Alcala (G minor/G major) – Interlude (entr'acte) before act 2
- Les Toréadors (A major) – Theme from prelude to act 1 and Procession of the Toreadors from act 4: "Les voici! voici la quadrille des Toreros!".

Suite No. 1 was published c. 1885.

The Aragonaise was also used by Pablo de Sarasate in his Carmen Fantasy for violin and orchestra and by Franz Waxman in his own Carmen Fantasie.

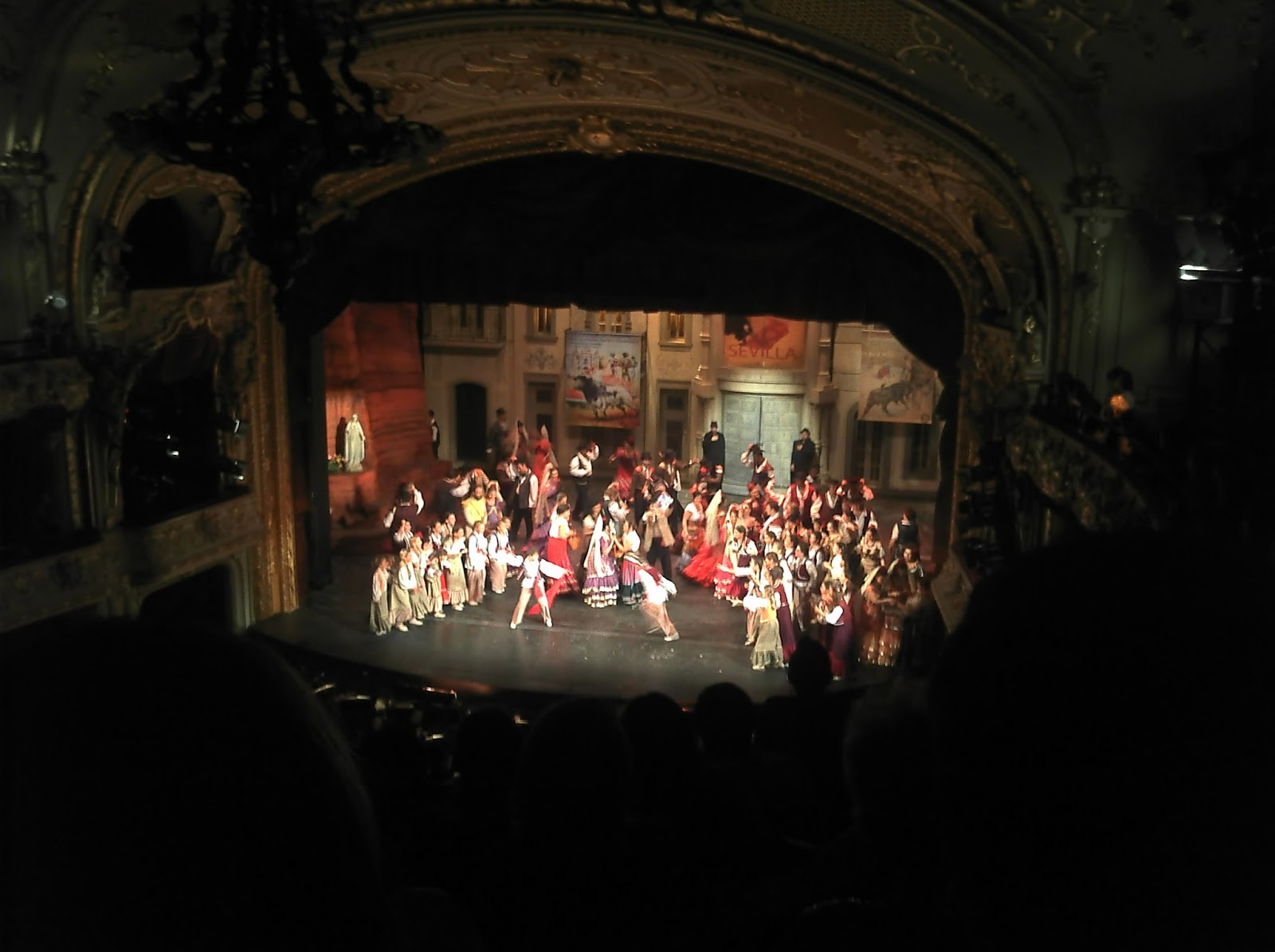
Choreographed Opera performance

== Carmen Suite No. 2 ==
- Marche des Contrebandiers (C minor) – Act 3, chorus: "Écoute, écoute, compagnon!"
- Habanera (D minor/D major): Act 1, aria (Carmen) – "L'amour est un oiseau rebelle"
- Nocturne (E♭ major): Act 3, aria (Micaëla) – "Je dis que rien ne m'épouvante"
- Chanson du Toréador (F minor/F major) – Act 2, introduction and aria (Escamillo): "Votre toast, je peux vous le rendre"
- La Garde Montante (D minor) – Act 1: "Avec la garde montante, nous arrivons, nous voilà!"
- Chanson Bohème (E minor) – Act 2, Gypsy Dance: "Les tringles des sistres tintaient"

Suite No. 2 is longer than the first suite. It was published in 1887.
