= Olivia Smart =

British-Spanish ice dancer (born 1997)

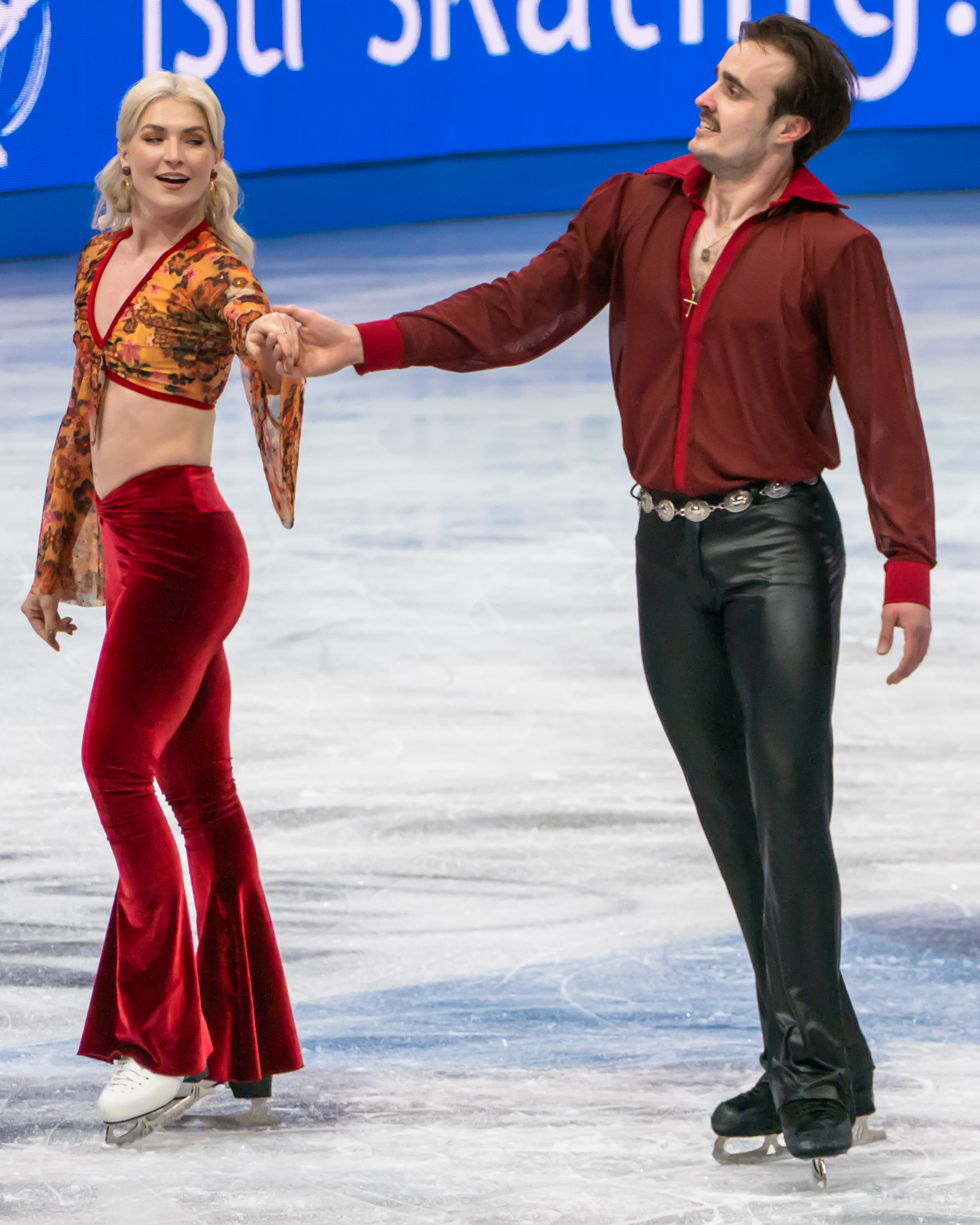
- Olivia Smart and Tim Dieck following their rhythm dance at the 2025 World Championships

Personal information
- Full name: Olivia Sophie Smart
- Born: 1 April 1997 (age 29) Sheffield, England, United Kingdom
- Home town: Barcelona, Spain & Montreal, Canada
- Height: 1.65 m (5 ft 5 in)

Figure skating career
- Country: Spain (since 2016); Great Britain (2011–15)
- Discipline: Ice dance
- Partner: Tim Dieck (since 2023); Adrián Díaz (2016–22); Joseph Buckland (2011–15)
- Coach: Marie-France Dubreuil; Patrice Lauzon; Romain Haguenauer; Pascal Denis
- Skating club: F.C. Barcelona
- Began skating: 2006

Medal record
Representing Spain
Spanish Championships
Gold medal – first place	2018 Jaca	Ice dance
Gold medal – first place	2020 San Sebastián	Ice dance
Gold medal – first place	2022 Jaca	Ice dance
Gold medal – first place	2024 Logroño	Ice dance
Gold medal – first place	2025 Logroño	Ice dance
Gold medal – first place	2026 Jaca	Ice dance
Silver medal – second place	2017 Vielha	Ice dance
Silver medal – second place	2019 Logroño	Ice dance
Representing Great Britain
British Championships
Gold medal – first place	2015 Sheffield	Ice dance

Olivia Smart (born 1 April 1997) is a British-Spanish ice dancer, who currently competes with Tim Dieck for Spain. Together, they are three-time Spanish national champions (2024–26), two-time Grand Prix medalists, and a five-time Challenger Series medalists (including three gold). They won a small bronze medal for their free dance at the 2025 World Championships. They represented Spain at the 2026 Winter Olympics.

She also previously represented Spain with Adrián Díaz. With Díaz, Smart was the 2021 Skate Canada International bronze medalist, a four-time Challenger Series medalist, and a three-time Spanish national champion (2018, 2020, 2022). They represented Spain at the 2022 Winter Olympics.

With former partner Joseph Buckland, she is the 2015 British national champion, a three-time British national junior champion (2012–14), and competed at three World Junior Championships, reaching the top ten in 2014. As well, she competed on the fifteenth series of ITV's Dancing on Ice, partnered with Nile Wilson.

== Personal life ==
Olivia Smart was born on 1 April 1997 in Sheffield, England. She attended Sheffield High School for Girls. Olivia's Trains, a model railway shop in the city, is named after her. She became a Spanish citizen in July 2017.

Since 2024, she has been in a relationship with British-American ice dancer, Jean-Luc Baker. The pair announced their engagement via Instagram on Valentine's Day while at the 2026 Winter Olympics in Milan, Italy.

== Skating career ==
=== Ice dance with Joseph Buckland (for Great Britain) ===
Smart teamed up with Joseph Buckland in 2010. They made their JGP debut in autumn 2011, ranking thirteenth in Austria and twelfth in Estonia. They came in seventeenth at their first World Junior Championships, held in Minsk in March 2012. In the 2012–2013 season, the duo missed the JGP series and finished twenty-second at the 2013 World Junior Championships in Milan.

In 2013–2014, Smart/Buckland placed seventh at both of their JGP assignments, Poland and the Czech Republic, and finished tenth at the 2014 World Junior Championships in Sofia, Bulgaria.

Smart/Buckland moved to the senior level in the 2014–2015 season. In October 2014, they placed fourth at the Ondrej Nepela Trophy, an ISU Challenger Series event. In November, they won silver medals at the International Cup of Nice and NRW Trophy before taking the British national title in the absence of longstanding champions Coomes/Buckland. Smart/Buckland withdrew from the 2015 European Championships before the short dance, Buckland having fallen ill with gastroenteritis. The duo went on to place twenty-seventh at the 2015 World Championships in Shanghai, China. Following that season, they split.

=== 2016–2017 season: Debut of Smart/Díaz ===
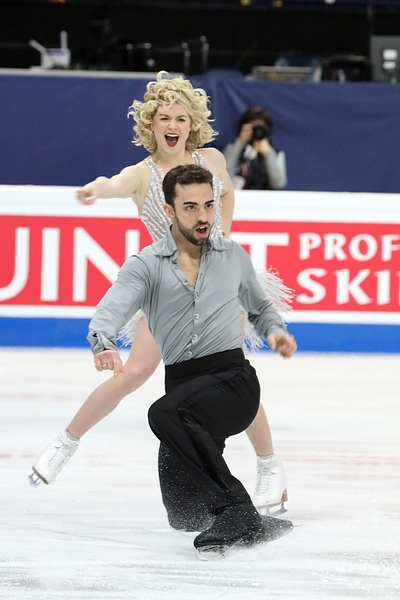
Smart and Díaz during their rhythm dance at the 2017 World Championships

On 13 December 2015, it was announced that Smart had teamed up with Spanish ice dancer Adrián Díaz and that they wished to represent Spain. On 15 January 2016, Smart announced that the British skating association had released her and that she and Díaz would train in Montreal, Quebec, Canada, under Marie-France Dubreuil, Patrice Lauzon, and Romain Haguenauer.

Making their international debut, Smart/Díaz took silver behind Pogrebinsky/Benoit at the Lake Placid Ice Dance International in late July 2016. They later competed at three ISU Challenger Series events, placing fourth at the 2016 U.S. International Classic, sixth at the 2016 CS Autumn Classic International, and sixth at the 2016 CS Finlandia Trophy, before winning gold at the Open d'Andorra.

Smart/Díaz finished second to Hurtado/Khaliavin at the Spanish Championships. As a result, they were not nominated for the 2017 European Championships.

Smart/Díaz took silver in February at the Bavarian Open. Later that month, Federación Española Deportes de Hielo (FEDH) selected them to compete at the 2017 World Championships, the main Olympic-qualifying competition. The two placed sixteenth in the short dance, nineteenth in the free dance, and eighteenth overall at the event in Helsinki, Finland. Their result allowed Spain to send one ice dancing team to the Olympics.

=== 2017–2018 season: First Spanish national title ===
In July 2017, FEDH announced that Spain's Olympic spot would go to the team which received the highest combined score at the 2017 CS Golden Spin of Zagreb and Spanish Championships.

Smart/Díaz began their season on the Challenger Series, placing seventh at the 2017 U.S. International Figure Skating Classic and fourth at the 2017 Autumn Classic International. Making their Grand Prix debut, they placed sixth at the 2017 Skate Canada International in October. In December, they placed fifth at the 2017 CS Golden Spin of Zagreb, scoring 4.18 points less than Hurtado/Khaliavin. Later that month, they won the Spanish national title by a 3.23-point margin, resulting in a final deficit of 0.95 points. On 17 December 2017, FEDH announced that Hurtado/Khaliavin would compete at the European Championships and Olympics while Smart/Díaz would be assigned to the 2018 World Championships. They finished twelfth at the event in Milan, Italy.

=== 2018–2019 season ===
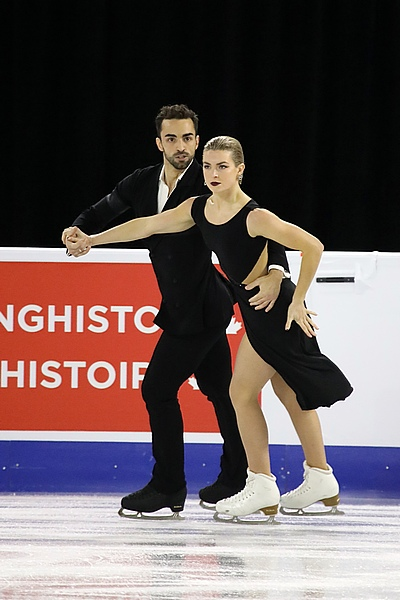
Smart and Díaz at the 2018 Skate Canada International

Smart/Díaz began their season at the Autumn Classic International Challenger Series event, where they placed second behind Canadians Weaver/Poje. At the onset of the 2018–19 season, they were assigned to two Grand Prix events, the Skate Canada and Internationaux de France, finishing fifth at the former and seventh at the latter.

After winning the silver medal at the Spanish Championships, finishing behind Hurtado/Khaliavin, they placed eighth at the 2019 European Championships.

=== 2019–2020 season ===
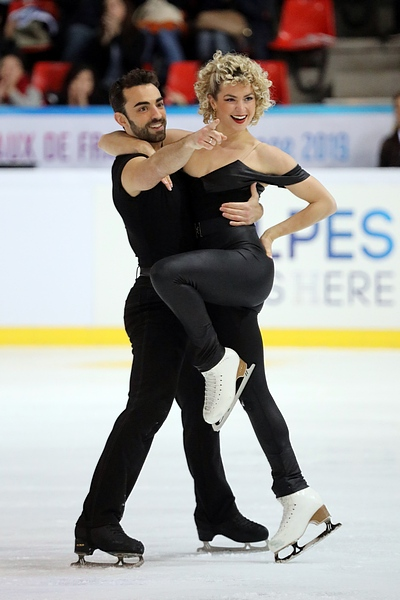
Smart and Díaz at the 2019 Internationaux de France

Smart/Díaz began the season with a victory at the 2019 Lake Placid Ice Dance International and then placed fourth at the 2019 CS Autumn Classic International. At their first Grand Prix assignment, 2019 Skate America, they placed fourth, with three new personal bests set. Smart/Díaz concluded the Grand Prix with another fourth-place finish at the 2019 Internationaux de France.

After winning the Spanish national title for the second time, they finished eighth at the 2020 European Championships, below Hurtado/Khaliavin in seventh place. Despite this, they were assigned to compete at the World Championships in Montreal, but these were cancelled as a result of the COVID-19 pandemic.

=== 2020–2021 season ===
Smart/Díaz were assigned to the 2020 Skate Canada International, but this event was also cancelled due to the pandemic.

While Smart/Díaz were listed on the preliminary entry list for the 2021 World Championships, the Spanish Ice Sports Federation announced on 2 March that the final determination as to which team would represent Spain would be made following a virtual skate-off between them and Hurtado/Khaliavin. On 7 March, the Spanish federation announced that the berth had been awarded to Hurtado/Khaliavin.

=== 2021–2022 season: Beijing Olympics ===
Smart/Díaz began the Olympic season at the 2021 CS Autumn Classic International, where they won the silver medal, setting new personal best scores in the free dance and overall in the process. They beat domestic rivals Hurtado/Khaliavin by 0.25 points in the first of three matchups to determine which team would be named to the Spanish Olympic team at their second event, the 2021 CS Finlandia Trophy.

Competing on the Grand Prix at the 2021 Skate America, they placed fourth in the rhythm dance, 1.27 points behind Canadian training partners Fournier Beaudry/Sørensen. They came third in the free dance but remained fourth overall by 0.54 points. Their Zorro free dance received a standing ovation from the audience, with Smart commenting that the "reaction of the crowd made it all worthwhile and so memorable." The following week at their second Grand Prix, 2021 Skate Canada International, they were third in both segments of the competition, winning the bronze medal, their first Grand Prix medal.

Smart/Díaz faced off against Hurtado/Khaliavin at the 2022 Spanish Championships and won both segments of the competition to take the gold medal with a score of 202.47, with a margin of 8.12 points over their silver medalist rivals, expanding their cumulative margin to 8.37 points. Both teams then went to the 2022 European Championships, the third and final competition for the Spanish Olympic berth. Smart/Díaz were fifth in the rhythm dance and moved up to fourth overall with a fourth-place free dance, despite a technical fall on their ending pose. Smart remarked that this season was "the hardest we've ever worked for anything. It's not only been this competition; it has been the whole season that we gave everything we had." Hurtado/Khaliavin finished in sixth place, 4.96 points back. With a cumulative margin of 13.33 points, Smart/Díaz were subsequently named to Spain's Olympic team.

Competing at the 2022 Winter Olympics in the dance event, Smart/Díaz placed ninth in the rhythm dance. They skated a new personal best in the free dance, breaking 120 points in the segment for the first time with a score of 121.41. Due to errors by higher-ranked teams Fournier Beaudry/Sørensen, Gilles/Poirier and Stepanova/Bukin they were sixth in that segment and rose to eighth overall.

Smart/Díaz finished their season at the 2022 World Championships, held in Montpellier. Russian dance teams were absent due to the International Skating Union banning all Russian athletes due to their country's invasion of Ukraine. They finished seventh, the highest ever result for a Spanish team, and finally achieving the Spanish federation's long-desired goal of earning two berths for Spanish dance teams at the World Championships.

On 23 May, the Spanish federation announced that Díaz was retiring from competition. They indicated that Smart would "follow a new sporting path" with the federation.

=== Dancing on Ice and new partnership ===
With the end of her partnership with Díaz, Smart sought out other opportunities, and was announced as a new professional skater for series 15 of ITV's Dancing on Ice. She was partnered with Nile Wilson, a 2016 Summer Olympic bronze medalist in artistic gymnastics.

At the same time, Smart began to develop a new competitive partnership with German ice dancer Tim Dieck. The two explored options to represent either Spain or Germany, but the Spanish federation offered superior financial support, and they ultimately requested that Dieck be released by the German Ice Skating Union. In December 2022, it was announced that Dieck had been released by the German federation. The two planned to begin training in Montreal in April 2023 with an eye to competing in the 2023–24 season.

Smart and Wilson were named the winners of Dancing on Ice. She said afterward of her time on the show that "I've had a hard time and I've trained for the Olympics but this has been hard. We've loved it but it has been hard physically, mentally. I've learned a lot from doing this show and I'd love to take what I've learnt from this back to competing."

=== 2023–2024 season: Debut of Smart/Dieck ===
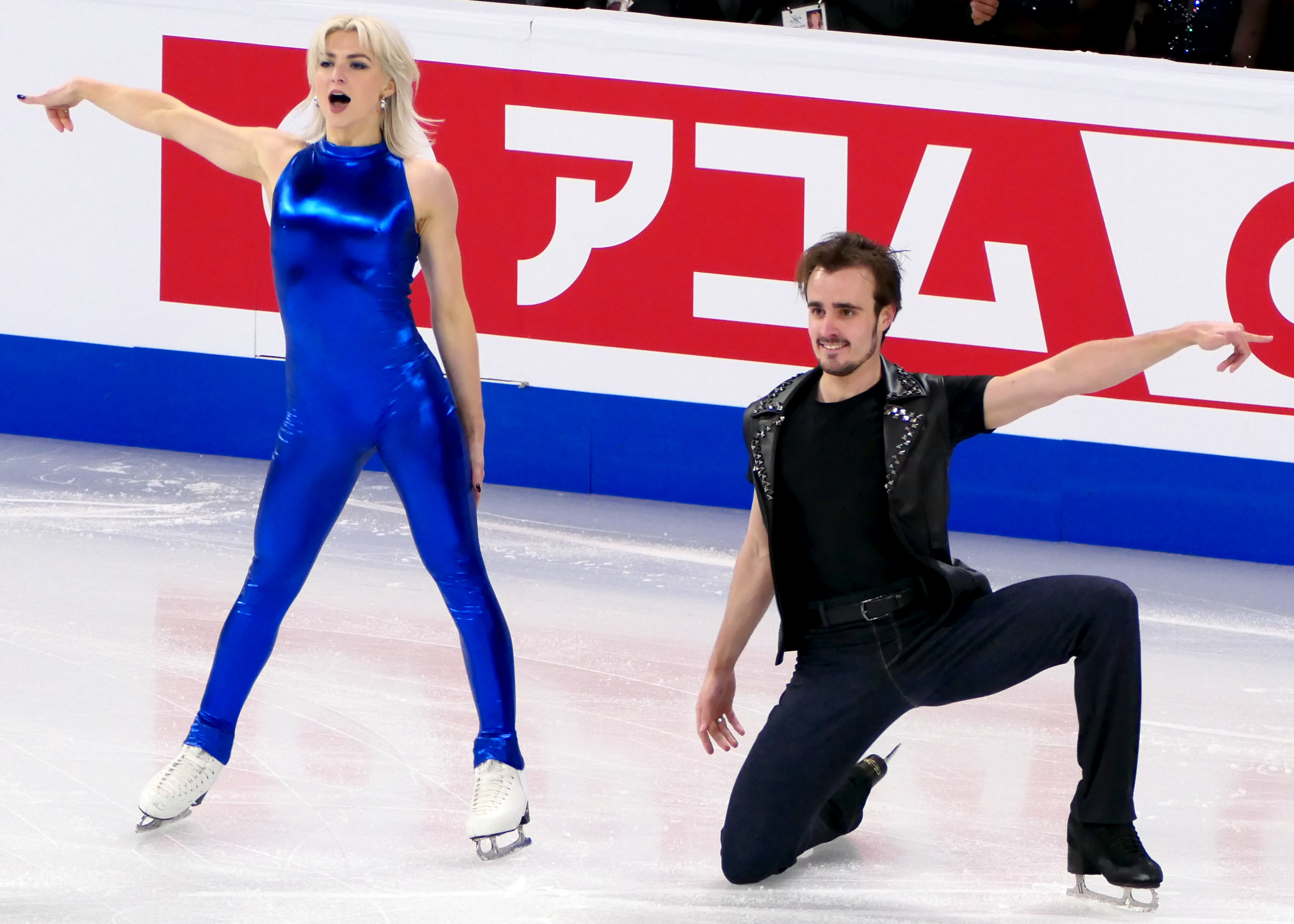
Smart and Dieck during their rhythm dance at the 2024 World Championships

Smart and Dieck made their competitive debut on the Challenger circuit, finishing in fourth place at the 2023 CS Autumn Classic International. They went to come fourth as well at the 2023 CS Finlandia Trophy. Making their Grand Prix debut as a team at the 2023 Skate America, Smart/Dieck placed sixth. They were then eighth at the 2023 Grand Prix de France.

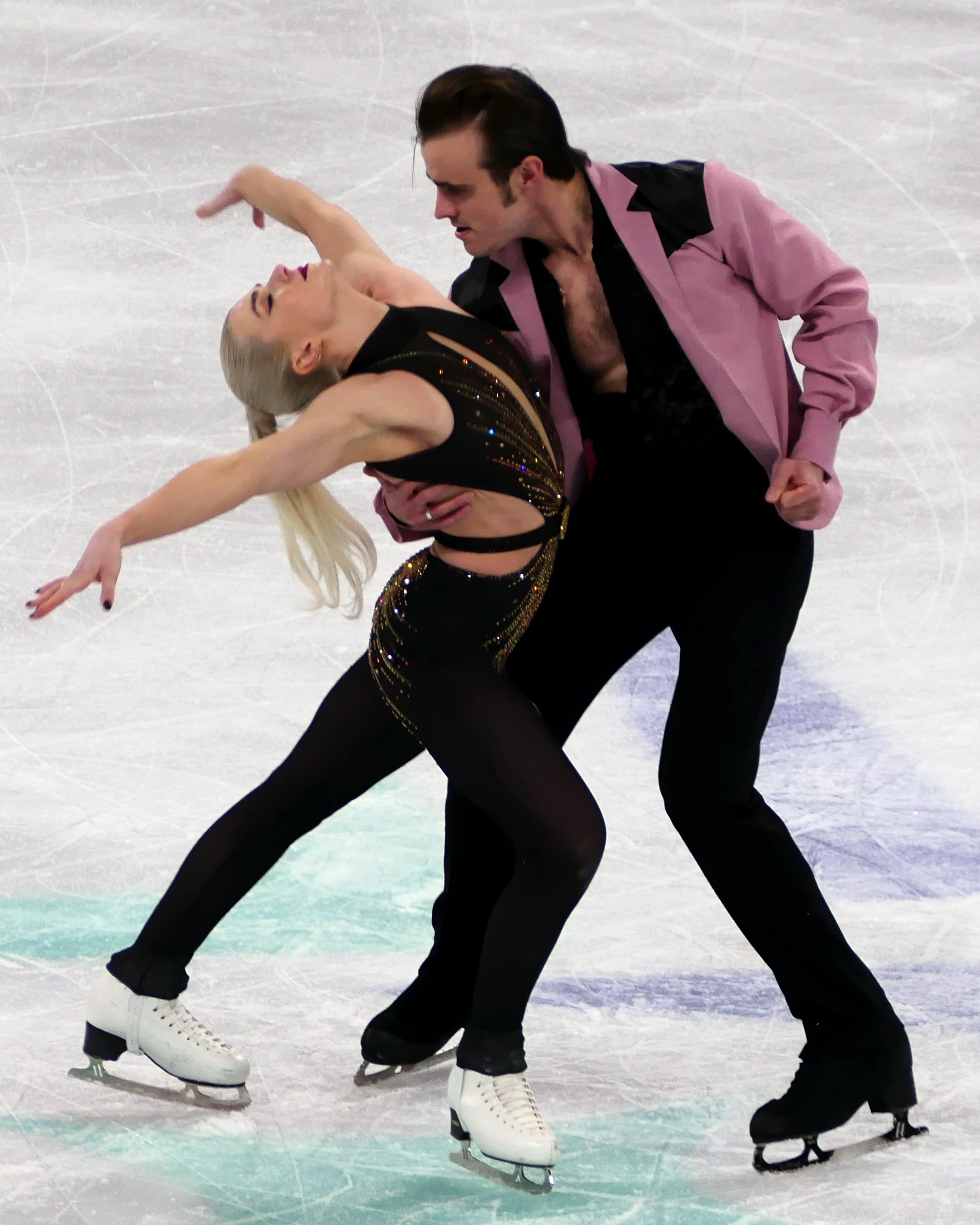
Smart and Dieck during their free dance at the 2024 World Championships

Competing at their first Spanish Championships in December, Smart/Dieck won the gold medal over rivals Val/Kazimov. Despite this, it was initially announced by the Spanish federation that Val/Kazimov would represent the country at the 2024 European and World Championships. Following controversy around the criteria used to arrive at this result, on 27 December the Spanish federation announced that Smart/Dieck would instead be given the country's lone World Championship berth.

Smart/Dieck won the silver medal at the International Challenge Cup in February. At the World Championships, held in Montreal, Quebec, Canada, the home of the team's training base, Smart/Dieck were fifteenth in the rhythm dance and qualified to the free dance. An error on their dance spin saw them finish twentieth among twenty teams in the free dance, dropping to nineteenth overall. Smart remarked that the mistake "fits within this season full of ups and downs, which we accept as a lesson we have to learn"

=== 2024–2025 season: Dune and Grand Prix bronze ===
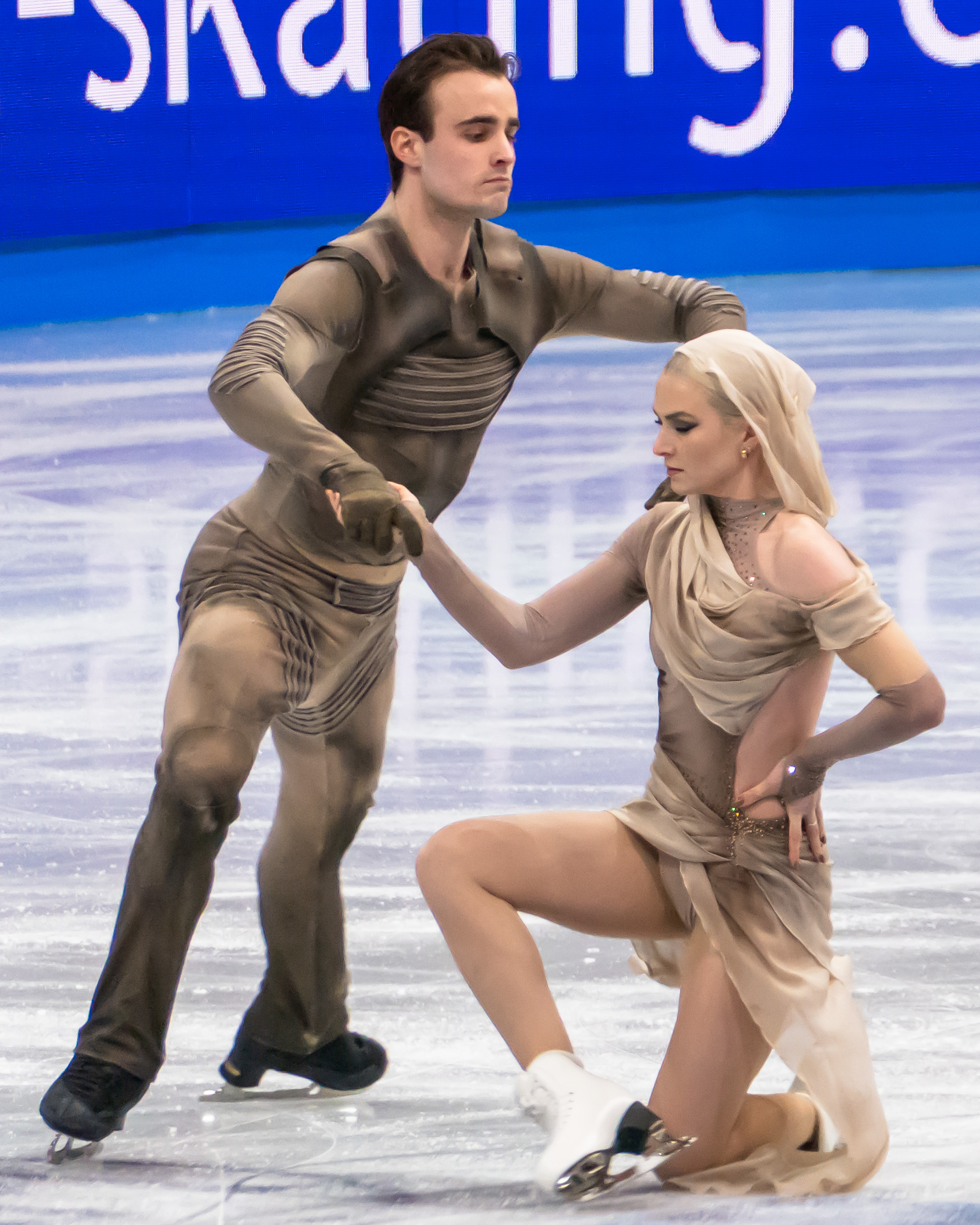
Smart and Dieck performing their "Dune" free dance at the 2025 World Championships

When preparing their programs for the new season, Smart suggested for their free program Hans Zimmer's Dune soundtrack, explaining later that "it gave me a feeling I wanted to feel... I wanted something that gave me goosebumps, something that made me feel that type of way." They were the only ice dance team to use that music during the season.

Smart and Dieck began the season on the Challenger circuit with a sixth-place finish at the 2024 Nebelhorn Trophy. On the 2024–25 Grand Prix series, their first assignment was the 2024 Skate America, they finished fifth in the short program, having lost a twizzle level and receiving only a level one on their pattern steps. However, they came third in the free dance with a new personal best (118.45), and rose to third overall to claim the bronze medal. Smart said that the free dance score made her feel that "finally all our hard work had paid off. Of course there were plenty of doubts." Smart also debuted a new Dune-themed free dance costume at Skate America that had been designed by friend and training partner Madison Chock, saying later "I should have gone to her in the first place." Both the costuming and the program would garner acclaim at the event. One week later, Smart/Dieck won a bronze medal at the 2024 CS Nepela Memorial, their second Challenger appearance. Going on to compete at the 2024 Cup of China, Smart and Dieck were fifth in the rhythm dance and third in the free dance, as at Skate America, but this time finishing fourth overall.

In December, Smart/Dieck won their second consecutive national title at the 2025 Spanish Championships. The following month they made their European Championship debut at the 2025 edition in Tallinn, Estonia. During a practice session, the team had a collision with Israeli dancers Elizabeth Tkachenko and Alexei Kiliakov; while Dieck hit his head on the ice, Kiliakov was cut on the leg and as a result the Israelis withdrew from the event. Smart/Dieck came seventh in the rhythm dance, fifth in the free dance, and finished fifth overall. The Dune program again received a strong reception, Dieck observing that "the audience was incredible. Like, they were so into it. At the quiet parts of the music, you could have heard a pin drop."

At the 2025 World Championships in Boston, Massachusetts, United States, Smart/Dieck placed eighth in the rhythm dance (77.21), setting a new personal best. In the free dance they set another best score of 123.71, which placed third in the segment, elevating them to sixth place overall. They received a bronze small medal for the free dance, a first for a Spanish dance team. Smart said afterward that while they were considering another idea for an Olympic season free dance, it was also possible that they would retain the Dune program for the next season, remarking "we need to weigh our options carefully." They also talked about the evolution of their partnership, the deep trust they've built, their connection, and insight into their training process. They subsequently received the award for Best Costume at the 2025 ISU Skating Awards.

=== 2025–26 season: Milano Cortina Olympics ===
Smart/Dieck performing their free dance at the 2026 European Championships

For the upcoming season, Smart/Dieck announced that they planned to continue performing to the music of Dune for their free dance and that they would "revamp" the program by skating to different tracks from the movies. "We elevated our elements from last season; the transitions are much harder, so we need to build the stamina to skate it cleanly," explained Dieck.

They began the season in late September by winning gold at the 2025 CS Nepela Memorial. The following month, they started competing on the 2025–26 Grand Prix series, finishing fourth at the 2025 Cup of China. "It wasn't our best skate, but it was decent," said Dieck of the Free Dance. "We felt a few little wobbles, maybe not even visible, but the goal was to come as close as possible to how we train, and it was almost there."

The following month, Smart and Dieck placed fourth at 2025 Finlandia Trophy. "Today felt good," said Smart after the Free Dance. "We went out there and did what we could today where we are in this part of the season. They were tough on technique here this week from the Rhythm Dance and the Free Dance. We knew we could be up there in the top three on the podium."

In January, Smart and Dieck competed at the 2026 European Championships where they found themselves in tenth place after the rhythm dance. "This score wasn’t what we hoped for," said Smart. "We definitely want to push more towards the 80s and compete with the top teams." They went on to place fifth in the free dance with a new season's best, and moved up to seventh place overall. "We don’t want to be known as a free dance team," said Smart after the Free Dance. "We want to be up there in the rhythm dance and up there in the free. And yesterday that could have been possible. We could have been closer to the 80s." That same month, it was announced that Smart and alpine skier, Joaquim Salarich, had been selected as the flag bearers for Spain at the upcoming Winter Olympic opening ceremony.

The following month, Smart and Dieck competed at the 2026 Winter Olympics. They placed tenth in the rhythm dance and sixth in the free dance to finish in ninth place overall. "We just finished on an absolute high at our first Olympics together," said Dieck following their free dance. "Worlds are next, and then we’ll see what next season holds. But we’ve definitely said we want to continue. We’re taking it season by season."

In March, Smart and Dieck finished fifth at the 2026 World Championships in Prague, Czech Republic after placing sixth in the rhythm dance and second in the free dance. In the process, the team earned personal best scores in all segments of the competition. "We are overjoyed," said Dieck after their free dance performance. "We had no expectations coming in here other than to do exactly what we did on the ice. To create a moment, skate the best we ever skated this ‘Dune: Part Two.’ And we did that here today on the ice in Prague. The outcome is a small silver medal, something we believed we could achieve and something that we wanted. But we never speak too far into existence because we don’t want to have too many expectations."

=== 2026–27 season ===
Smart/Dieck opened their season in September at 2026 Nepela Memorial where they won gold. In October, they followed up with a silver medal at 2026 Budapest Trophy.

In November, Smart/Dieck competed at 2026 Cup of China, placing third after a mistake in the rhythm dance. “We’re not very happy,” said Smart after the free dance. “We were both nervous going into the free dance, and after a day like yesterday, it makes sense. We felt like we did our job today, but we have a lot more training to do on this program.”

== Programs ==
=== Ice dance with Tim Dieck (for Spain) ===
Season	Short dance	Free dance	Exhibition
2026–2027	Ramalama (Bang Bang) by Róisín Murphy	Sadeness (Part I); Gravity of Love by Enigma	
2025–2026	Freedom; Let Me Entertain You by Robbie Williams choreo. by Samuel Chouinard	Beginnings Are Such Delicate Times; Resurrection; Dune Part Two (Trailer Mix) (from Dune: Part Two) by Hans Zimmer; Dune Part Two - Trailer 3 Music (epic version) by Mathias Fritsche; Navras (from The Matrix Revolutions) by Don Davis & Juno Reactor all arranged by Karl Hugo choreo. by Romain Haguenauer	Tubthumping by Chumbawamba; Beautiful Day by U2; Freed from Desire by Gala
2024–2025	Move Over by Janis Joplin; Piece of My Heart by Jerry Ragovoy & Bert Berns performed by Big Brother and the Holding Company & Janis Joplin; Black Betty by Ram Jam choreo. by Marie-France Dubreuil	Resurrection; Seduction (from Dune: Part Two); House Atreides (from Dune); A Time of Quiet Between the Storms; Trailer 3 Music Dune Part Two (from Dune: Part Two) by Hans Zimmer; The Feeling Begins (from The Last Temptation of Christ) by Peter Gabriel choreo. by Romain Haguenauer, Samuel Chouinard	Also sprach Zarathustra/An American Trilogy by Richard Strauss performed by Elvis Presley; Craw-Fever by Elvis Presley; Suspicious Minds performed by Paravi; Trouble (from Elvis) performed by Austin Butler Marie-France Dubreuil, Romain Haguenauer choreo. by Marie-France Dubreuil, Romain Haguenauer
2024–2025	Move Over by Janis Joplin; Piece of My Heart by Jerry Ragovoy & Bert Berns performed by Big Brother and the Holding Company & Janis Joplin; Touch Me by The Doors choreo. by Marie-France Dubreuil	Resurrection; Seduction (from Dune: Part Two); House Atreides (from Dune); A Time of Quiet Between the Storms; Trailer 3 Music Dune Part Two (from Dune: Part Two) by Hans Zimmer; The Feeling Begins (from The Last Temptation of Christ) by Peter Gabriel choreo. by Romain Haguenauer, Samuel Chouinard	Also sprach Zarathustra/An American Trilogy by Richard Strauss performed by Elvis Presley; Craw-Fever by Elvis Presley; Suspicious Minds performed by Paravi; Trouble (from Elvis) performed by Austin Butler Marie-France Dubreuil, Romain Haguenauer choreo. by Marie-France Dubreuil, Romain Haguenauer
2023–2024	Call Me; Rapture by Blondie choreo. by Marie-France Dubreuil, Romain Haguenauer	Also sprach Zarathustra/An American Trilogy by Richard Strauss performed by Elvis Presley; Craw-Fever by Elvis Presley; Suspicious Minds performed by Paravi; Trouble (from Elvis) performed by Austin Butler choreo. by Marie-France Dubreuil, Romain Haguenauer	The Race by Yello

=== Ice dance with Adrián Díaz (for Spain) ===
Season	Short dance	Free dance	Exhibition
2021–2022	Blues: Proud Mary; Swing: Proud Mary performed by Tina Turner	I Was Always There (from Puss in Boots) by Henry Jackman; The Fencing Lesson (from The Mask of Zorro) by James Horner; I Want to Spend My Lifetime Loving You (from The Mask of Zorro) by Tina Arena & Marc Anthony; The Plaza of Execution (from The Mask of Zorro) by James Horner	Maniac (from Flashdance) by Dennis Matkovsky, Michael Sembello performed by Michael Sembello
2020–2021	Swing: Grease performed by Frankie Valli; Quickstep: You're the One That I Want performed by John Travolta & Olivia Newton-John; Jive: Born to Hand Jive performed by Sha Na Na (from Grease)	Power of Imagination (from Fantasia) by Leopold Stokowski	
2019–2020	Swing: Grease performed by Frankie Valli; Swing: Greased Lightnin' performed by John Travolta; Quickstep: You're the One That I Want performed by John Travolta & Olivia Newton-John; Jive: Born to Hand Jive performed by Sha Na Na (from Grease)	Larrons en Foire (from Micmacs) by Raphaël Beau; My One and Only Love by Guy Wood, Robert Mellin performed by Thomas Hanreich	Maniac (from Flashdance) by Dennis Matkovsky, Michael Sembello performed by Michael Sembello
2018–2019	Tango: A Evaristo Carriego performed by Orquestra Color Tango	A Day in the Life by Jeff Beck; Something; Let It Be by The Beatles	
2017–2018	Rhumba: One to Eight; Cha Cha: Rhumba; Merengue: Bailar by DJ Deorro feat. Elvis Crespo	It's a Man's Man's Man's World by James Brown, Betty Jean Newsome performed by Seal; Composition by Karl Hugo; (You Make Me Feel Like) A Natural Woman by Gerry Goffin, Carole King, Jerry Wexler performed by Amanda Brown	Proud Mary by John Fogerty covered by Tina Turner
2016–2017	Blues and Jive Proud Mary by John Fogerty covered by Tina Turner	Experience by Ludovico Einaudi; Circles (Experience remix) by Ludovico Einaudi, Greta Svabo Bech; Composition by Karl Hugo	

=== Ice dance with Joseph Buckland (for Great Britain) ===
Season	Short dance	Free dance
2014–2015	Paso doble: Diablo Rojo by Rodrigo y Gabriela; Flamenco: Crepuscolo Sul Mare by Piero Umiliani	Sunset Boulevard by Andrew Lloyd Webber
2013–2014	Puttin' On the Ritz by Irving Berlin; Bang Bang	Paso Doble; El Mariachi; Once Upon A Time in Mexico by Robert Rodriguez
2012–2013	Swing Set by Jurassic 5; Feeling Good by Escala	Tango in Ebony by Maksim, Julian Kershaw; Butterflies and Hurricanes by William Joseph
2011–2012	Natural Passion by Latin Festival; Sway	That Man by Caro Emerald; Ain't No Sunshine by Lighthouse Family; Pencil Full of Lead by Paolo Nutini

== Competitive highlights ==
- GP – Event of the ISU Grand Prix Series
- JGP – Event of the ISU Junior Grand Prix Series
- CS – Event of the ISU Challenger Series
- TBD – Assigned
- WD – Withdrew from competition
- C – Event was cancelled

=== Ice dance with Tim Dieck (for Spain) ===
Competition placements at senior level
Season	2023–24	2024–25	2025–26	2026–27
Winter Olympics			9th	
World Championships	19th	6th	5th	
European Championships		5th	7th	
Spanish Championships	1st	1st	1st	
GP Cup of China		4th	4th	3rd
GP Finland			4th	
GP France	8th			
GP NHK Trophy				TBD
GP Skate America	6th	3rd		
CS Autumn Classic	4th			
CS Budapest Trophy				2nd
CS Finlandia Trophy	4th			
CS Nebelhorn Trophy		6th		
CS Nepela Memorial		3rd	1st	1st
CS Tallinn Trophy			1st	
Challenge Cup	2nd			

=== Ice dance with Adrián Díaz (for Spain) ===
Competition placements at senior level
Season	2016–17	2017–18	2018–19	2019–20	2021–22
Winter Olympics					8th
World Championships	18th	12th		C	7th
European Championships			8th	8th	4th
Spanish Championships	2nd	1st	2nd	1st	1st
GP France			7th	4th	
GP Skate America				4th	4th
GP Skate Canada		6th	5th		3rd
CS Autumn Classic	6th	4th	2nd	4th	2nd
CS Cup of Austria					3rd
CS Finlandia Trophy	6th		2nd		4th
CS Golden Spin of Zagreb		5th			
CS Nebelhorn Trophy				5th	
CS U.S. Classic	4th	7th			
Bavarian Open	2nd				
Lake Placid Ice Dance	2nd			1st	
Open d'Andorra	1st				

=== Ice dance with Joseph Buckland (for Great Britain) ===
Competition placements at senior level
Season	2014–15
World Championships	27th
British Championships	1st
CS Nepela Memorial	4th
Cup of Nice	2nd
NRW Trophy	2nd

Competition placements at junior level
Season	2011–12	2012–13	2013–14
World Junior Championships	17th	22nd	10th
British Championships	1st	1st	1st
JGP Austria	13th		
JGP Czech Republic			7th
JGP Estonia	12th		
JGP Poland			7th
Bavarian Open		6th	3rd
Mentor Cup	1st		
NRW Trophy			3rd
Santa Claus Cup		8th	

== Detailed results ==
ISU personal best scores in the +5/-5 GOE System
Segment	Type	Score	Event
Total	TSS	206.37	2026 World Championships
Short program	TSS	81.06	2026 World Championships
Short program	TES	46.11	2026 World Championships
Short program	PCS	34.95	2026 World Championships
Free skating	TSS	125.31	2026 World Championships
Free skating	TES	70.99	2025 World Championships
Free skating	PCS	54.64	2026 World Championships

=== Ice dance with Tim Dieck (for Spain) ===
Results in the 2023–24 season
Date	Event	RD		FD		Total	
Date	Event	P	Score	P	Score	P	Score
Sep 14–17, 2023	(Canada) 2023 CS Autumn Classic International	3	72.27	5	96.81	4	169.11
Oct 4–8, 2023	(Finland) 2023 CS Finlandia Trophy	3	72.56	6	105.91	4	178.47
Oct 20–22, 2023	(United States) 2023 Skate America	6	71.96	6	108.71	6	180.67
Nov 3–5, 2023	2023 Grand Prix de France	6	69.91	9	96.67	8	166.58
Dec 15–17, 2023	(Spain) 2024 Spanish Championships	1	73.04	1	111.94	1	184.98
Feb 22–25, 2024	(Netherlands) 2024 Challenge Cup	2	72.44	2	108.20	2	180.64
Mar 18–24, 2024	(Canada) 2024 World Championships	15	71.81	20	101.72	19	173.53

Results in the 2024–25 season
Date	Event	RD		FD		Total	
Date	Event	P	Score	P	Score	P	Score
Sep 19–21, 2024	(Germany) 2024 CS Nebelhorn Trophy	5	72.43	9	97.62	6	170.05
Oct 18–20, 2024	(United States) 2024 Skate America	5	70.99	3	118.45	3	189.44
Oct 24–26, 2024	(Slovakia) 2024 CS Nepela Memorial	3	74.77	3	116.69	3	191.46
Nov 22–24, 2024	2024 Cup of China	5	75.96	3	120.56	4	196.52
Dec 12–15, 2024	(Spain) 2025 Spanish Championships	1	79.75	1	125.77	1	205.52
Jan 28 – Feb 2, 2025	(Estonia) 2025 European Championships	7	76.13	5	122.85	5	198.98
Mar 26–30, 2025	(United States) 2025 World Championships	8	77.21	3	123.71	6	200.92

Results in the 2025–26 season
Date	Event	RD		FD		Total	
Date	Event	P	Score	P	Score	P	Score
Sep 25–27, 2025	(Slovakia) 2025 CS Nepela Memorial	2	74.44	1	118.23	1	192.67
Oct 24–26, 2025	2025 Cup of China	6	67.37	3	120.14	4	187.51
Nov 21–23, 2025	(Finland) 2025 Finlandia Trophy	4	76.07	4	115.99	4	192.06
Nov 25–30, 2025	(Estonia) 2025 CS Tallinn Trophy	4	73.03	1	119.64	1	192.67
Dec 11–14, 2025	(Spain) 2026 Spanish Championships	1	79.18	1	128.71	1	207.89
Jan 13–18, 2026	(United Kingdom) 2026 European Championships	10	75.17	5	121.27	7	196.44
Feb 9-11, 2026	(Italy) 2026 Winter Olympics	10	78.53	6	122.96	9	201.49
Mar 24–29, 2026	(Czech Republic) 2026 World Championships	6	81.06	2	125.31	5	206.37

Results in the 2026–27 season
Date	Event	RD		FD		Total	
Date	Event	P	Score	P	Score	P	Score
Sep 24–27, 2026	(Slovakia) 2026 CS Nepela Memorial	1	79.17	1	118.05	1	197.22
Oct 15–18, 2026	(Hungary) 2026 CS Budapest Trophy	1	79.42	4	105.67	2	185.09
Nov 6–8, 2026	2026 Cup of China	5	70.98	3	107.32	3	178.30

Olympic Games
Preceded by Támara Echegoyen and Marcus Walz	Flagbearer for Spain (with Joaquim Salarich); Milano Cortina 2026	Succeeded by
