= Tippy Packard =

American professional figure skater and choreographer

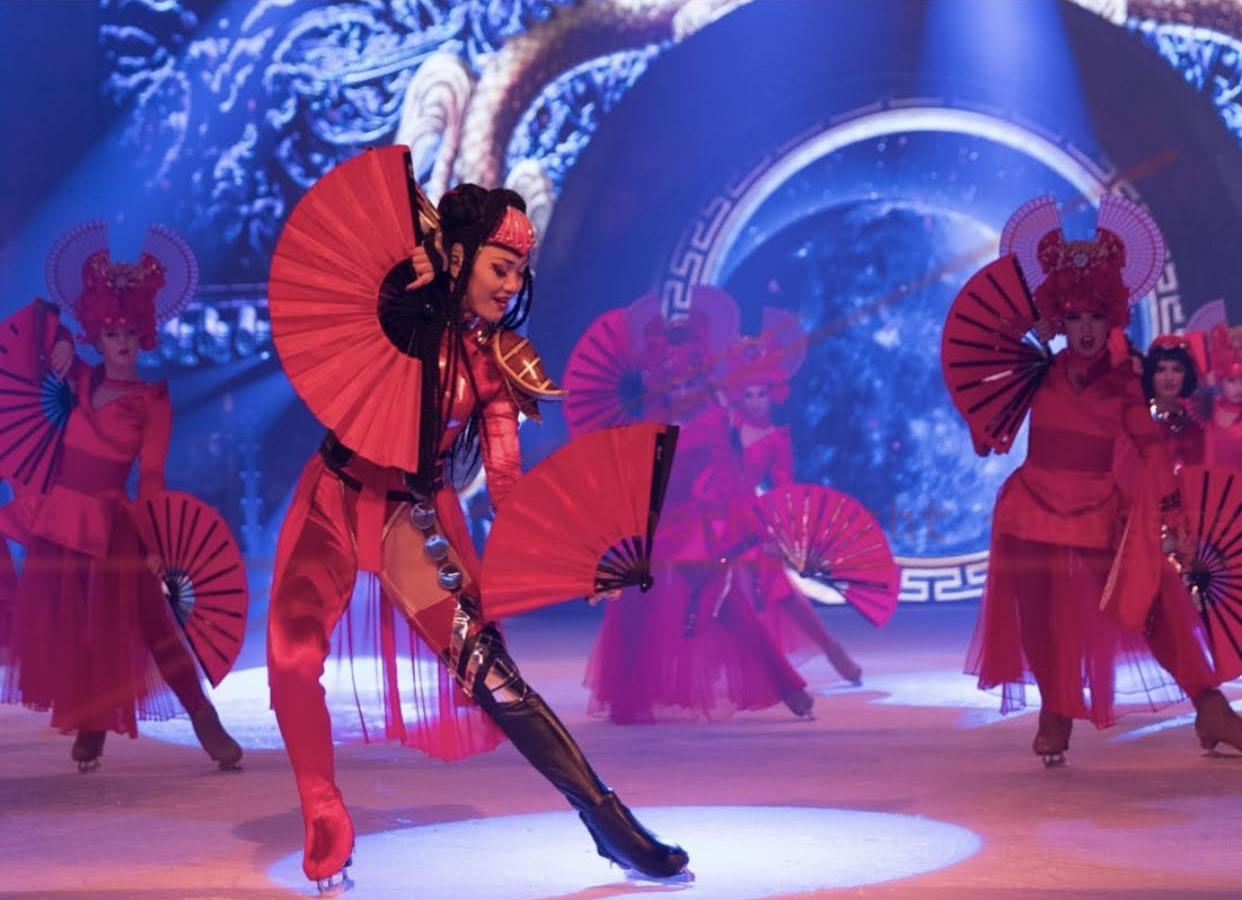
- Packard performing at Holiday on Ice 75th Anniversary

Personal information
- Born: Tiffany Packard Yu
- Home town: Hong Kong
- Height: 5 ft 5 in (1.65 m)

Figure skating career
- Country: Hong Kong
- Discipline: Women's singles & adagio pairs
- Coach: Alex Chang; Sondra Holmes; Jere Michael

Tiffany Packard Yu, known as Tippy Packard (Chinese: 余佩詩; Jyutping: jyu^{4} pui^{3} si^{1}), is a figure skater who represented Hong Kong and United States. Packard is an American professional ice skater and choreographer. Packard continued her professional skating career in mid 2013 as a female principle in Royal Caribbean Ice Shows and CNE-Canadian National Exhibition. She toured over 40 countries as a show skater after retiring from the competitive sport. In 2018, she joined a part of ice skating history by becoming the female principal for the 75th Anniversary of Holiday on Ice.

She was announced as a professional skater in Dancing on Ice Series 14.

She is a three time Hong Kong National Champion and Worlds Competitor. In 2022, Packard became a professional skater on the ITV skating series Dancing on Ice. In her first season, she was paired with Olympic BMX racer Kye Whyte. In Season 14, Packard and her partner Kye had an extremely successful first year: they were eliminated in the semi-final stage.

Tippy was partnered with former ski jumper Eddie (the Eagle) Edwards in Series 16: however a knee injury in training forced her to withdraw from the programme. In Series 17, she was partnered with Josh Jones, but the couple later withdrew from the competition after the third week (after Jones sustained an ankle injury).

== Skating results ==
International
Event	2008–2009	2009–2010	2010–2011	2011–2012	2012–2013
World Championships			31st		
Four Continents Championship		28th	25th		
Ice Challenge					23rd
Merano Cup			25th		
New Year's Cup					18th
U.S. Classic					10th
Volvo Open					18th
National
Hong Kong Championship	2nd	2nd	1st	1st	1st
