= Dancing on Ice series 12 =

Twelfth series of Dancing on Ice

Dancing on Ice
- Series 12
- Presented by: Phillip Schofield; Holly Willoughby
- Judges: Ashley Banjo; John Barrowman; Christopher Dean; Jayne Torvill
- Celebrity winner: Joe Swash
- Professional winner: Alex Murphy
- No. of episodes: 10

Release
- Original network: ITV
- Original release: 5 January – 8 March 2020

Series chronology
- ← Previous; Series 11 Next → Series 13

The twelfth series of Dancing on Ice debuted on ITV on 5 January 2020. During the finale of the eleventh series, it was announced that Dancing on Ice had been renewed for another series. The series is once again filmed in the purpose-built studio at Bovingdon Airfield.

Phillip Schofield and Holly Willoughby returned as hosts. On 1 September 2019, it was announced that Jason Gardiner would not return as a judge and that series 1 participant John Barrowman would replace him. On 22 December 2019, ITV aired Dancing on Ice at Christmas, a special featuring the contestants of series 12 along with previous champion Ray Quinn and series 11 contestant Gemma Collins. Jake Quickenden was also supposed to perform, but on 13 November 2019, it was announced that he had to pull out due to a neck injury.

Joe Swash and Alex Murphy were announced as the winners on 8 March 2020. Swash had originally been partnered with Alexandra Schauman; however, she had to withdraw after sustaining an injury.

== Couples ==
On 24 September 2019, Maura Higgins and Michael Barrymore were announced as the first two celebrities who would be participating in the series. More celebrities were revealed in the following days before the full line-up was announced on 1 October. On 9 October, it was announced that this series will feature the first ever same-sex couple: Ian "H" Watkins and Matt Evers.

Comedian and television presenter Michael Barrymore was originally announced as a contestant, but on 18 December 2019, he had to withdraw from the show due to a broken hand. Barrymore was replaced by former Blue Peter presenter Radzi Chinyanganya. Model and actress Caprice was originally partnered with Hamish Gaman, but after her first performance, they "parted ways" and she was re-partnered with Oscar Peter. She later withdrew from the competition on 2 February. Joe Swash was originally partnered with Alexandra Schauman; however, after she sustained an injury, she couldn't perform for the rest of the series and Swash was re-partnered with Alex Murphy on 26 January.

| Celebrity | Notability | Professional partner | Status |
|---|---|---|---|
| Trisha Goddard | Television presenter | Łukasz Różycki | Eliminated 1st on 12 January 2020 |
| Lucrezia Millarini | ITV News presenter & journalist | Brendyn Hatfield | Eliminated 2nd on 19 January 2020 |
| Radzi Chinyanganya | Blue Peter presenter | Jess Hatfield | Eliminated 3rd on 26 January 2020 |
| Caprice | Model & actress | Hamish Gaman; Oscar Peter (Week 4) | Withdrew on 2 February 2020 |
| Kevin Kilbane | Republic of Ireland footballer | Brianne Delcourt | Eliminated 4th on 2 February 2020 |
| Ian "H" Watkins | Steps singer | Matt Evers | Eliminated 5th on 9 February 2020 |
| Maura Higgins | Love Island finalist | Alexander Demetriou | Eliminated 6th on 16 February 2020 |
| Lisa George | Coronation Street actress | Tom Naylor | Eliminated 7th on 23 February 2020 |
| Ben Hanlin | Magician & television presenter | Carlotta Edwards | Eliminated 8th on 1 March 2020 |
| Libby Clegg | Paralympic sprinter | Mark Hanretty | Third place on 8 March 2020 |
| Perri Kiely | Diversity dancer | Vanessa Bauer | Runners-up on 8 March 2020 |
| Joe Swash | EastEnders actor & television presenter | Alexandra Schauman (Weeks 1–3); Alex Murphy (Weeks 4–10) | Winners on 8 March 2020 |

== Scoring chart ==
The highest score each week is indicated in bold green with a dagger (†), while the lowest score each week is indicated in italicized red with a double-dagger (‡).

Color key:

Winners
Runners-up
Third place
Bottom two
Excused from competition for the week
Withdrew from competition
Eliminated

Dancing on Ice (series 12) - Weekly scores
| Couple | Pl. | Week | | | | | | | | | |
| Couple | Pl. | 1 | 2 | 3 | 4 | 5 | 6 | 7 | 8 | 9 | 10 |
|---|---|---|---|---|---|---|---|---|---|---|---|
| Joe & Alexandra/Alex | 1st | 21.5 | —N/a | 20.5‡ | 27.0 | 29.5 | 32.0 | 34.0 | 34.0+2=36.0 | 38.0+38.0=76.0 | 40.0+40.0=**80.0**† (Note: This couple finished in first place.) |
| Perri & Vanessa | 2nd | **27.5**† | —N/a | **32.0**† | **33.5**† | **35.0**† | **38.0**† | **38.0**† | 39.5+5=**44.5**† | 38.5+40.0=**78.5**† | 40.0+40.0=**80.0**† (Note: This couple finished in second place.) |
| Libby & Mark | 3rd | —N/a | **28.0**† | 28.0 | 28.0 | (Note: This couple was excused from competition and was granted a bye to the following week.) | 33.0 | 33.5 (Note: This couple was in the bottom two, but was not eliminated.) | 35.5+3=38.5 | 39.0+38.5=77.5 | 40.0+40.0=**80.0**† (Note: This couple finished in third place.) |
| Ben & Carlotta | 4th | 22.5 | —N/a | 24.0 | 28.5 | 30.0 | 31.0 | 36.0 | 37.0+4=41.0 | 37.5+37.0=74.5‡ (Note: This couple was eliminated.) | |
| Lisa & Tom | 5th | 26.5 | —N/a | 28.0 | 32.0 | 27.0 | 30.0 | 31.5 | 31.5+1=32.5‡ | | |
| Maura & Alexander | 6th | —N/a | 22.0 | 25.0 | 25.0 | 28.0 | 30.5 | 30.0‡ | | | |
| H & Matt | 7th | 25.0 | —N/a | 26.5 | 28.0 | 29.0 | 29.5‡ | | | | |
| Kevin & Brianne | 8th | —N/a | 18.5 | 22.0 | 21.0‡ | 22.5‡ | | | | | |
| Caprice & Hamish/Oscar | 9th | —N/a | 25.5 | | 25.0 | (Note: This couple withdrew from the competition.) | | | | | |
| Radzi & Jess | 10th | —N/a | 21.0 | 24.5 | 23.0 | | | | | | |
| Lucrezia & Brendyn | 11th | —N/a | 18.0‡ | 21.0 | | | | | | | |
| Trisha & Łukasz | 12th | 13.5‡ | | | | | | | | | |

== Weekly scores ==
=== Week 1 (5 January) ===
Group performances:

- "Waiting All Night" — Rudimental, feat. Ella Eyre
- "Out of Our Heads" — Take That (Caprice & Hamish, Kevin & Brianne, Libby & Mark, Lucrezia & Brendyn, Maura & Alexander and Radzi & Jess)
- "Dusk Till Dawn" — Zayn, feat. Sia (performed by professional skaters)

Only half of the celebrities performed this week. The couple with the lowest votes from the first week competed against the couple with the lowest votes from second week in the skate-off. Couples are listed in the order they performed.

| Couple | Judges' scores | | | | Total score | Music | Result |
| Couple | Banjo | Barrowman | Torvill | Dean | Total score | Music | Result |
|---|---|---|---|---|---|---|---|
| Joe & Alexandra | 5.5 | 5.0 | 5.5 | 5.5 | 21.5 | "Dance with Me Tonight" — Olly Murs | Safe |
| Perri & Vanessa | 7.0 | 6.5 | 7.0 | 7.0 | 27.5 | "Puttin' On the Ritz" — Robbie Williams | Safe |
| Lisa & Tom | 6.0 | 6.5 | 7.0 | 7.0 | 26.5 | "When I Fall in Love" — Nat King Cole | Safe |
| Ben & Carlotta | 5.5 | 5.5 | 6.0 | 5.5 | 22.5 | "Bring Me to Life" — Evanescence | Safe |
| Trisha & Łukasz | 3.5 | 3.5 | 3.5 | 3.0 | 13.5 | "Give It Up" — KC and the Sunshine Band | Eliminated |
| H & Matt | 6.5 | 6.5 | 6.0 | 6.0 | 25.0 | "High Hopes" — Panic! at the Disco | Safe |

=== Week 2 (12 January) ===
Group performances:

- "The Time Is Now" — Moloko (performed by professional skaters)
- "Wow" — Kylie Minogue (Ben & Carlotta, H & Matt, Joe & Alexandra, Lisa & Tom, Perri, and Trisha & Łukasz)
- "When You Believe" — from The Prince of Egypt (performed by professional skaters)

Due to an injury, Vanessa Bauer wasn't able to perform with Perri Kiely in the group number.

Couples are listed in the order they performed.

| Couple | Judges' scores | | | | Total score | Music | Result |
| Couple | Banjo | Barrowman | Torvill | Dean | Total score | Music | Result |
|---|---|---|---|---|---|---|---|
| Maura & Alexander | 5.5 | 5.5 | 5.5 | 5.5 | 22.0 | "Juice" — Lizzo | Safe |
| Lucrezia & Brendyn | 5.0 | 4.5 | 4.5 | 4.0 | 18.0 | "Jump (For My Love)" — The Pointer Sisters | Bottom two |
| Kevin & Brianne | 4.5 | 4.5 | 4.5 | 5.0 | 18.5 | "Mr. Blue Sky" — Electric Light Orchestra | Safe |
| Caprice & Hamish | 6.0 | 6.0 | 6.5 | 7.0 | 25.5 | "Someone You Loved" — Lewis Capaldi | Safe |
| Radzi & Jess | 5.5 | 5.0 | 5.0 | 5.5 | 21.0 | "Cake by the Ocean" — DNCE | Safe |
| Libby & Mark | 7.0 | 7.0 | 7.0 | 7.0 | 28.0 | "Reet Petite" — Jackie Wilson | Safe |

Save Me skates

- Trisha & Łukasz: "Proud" — Heather Small
- Lucrezia & Brendyn: "Time After Time" — Cyndi Lauper

Judges' votes to save

- Banjo: Lucrezia & Brendyn
- Barrowman: Lucrezia & Brendyn
- Dean: Lucrezia & Brendyn
- Torvill: Did not need to vote, but would have voted for Lucrezia & Brendyn

=== Week 3 (19 January) ===
Theme: Musicals
Group performance: "Don't Rain on My Parade" — from Funny Girl

Because they had "parted ways", Caprice and Hamish Gaman did not perform this week.

Couples are listed in the order they performed.

| Couple | Judges' scores | | | | Total score | Music | Musical | Result |
| Couple | Banjo | Barrowman | Torvill | Dean | Total score | Music | Musical | Result |
|---|---|---|---|---|---|---|---|---|
| Lisa & Tom | 7.0 | 7.0 | 7.0 | 7.0 | 28.0 | "The Deadwood Stage (Whip-Crack-Away!)" | Calamity Jane | Safe |
| Kevin & Brianne | 5.5 | 5.5 | 5.5 | 5.5 | 22.0 | "Cheek to Cheek" | Top Hat | Bottom two |
| Lucrezia & Brendyn | 5.5 | 5.5 | 5.0 | 5.0 | 21.0 | "Mamma Mia" | Mamma Mia! | Eliminated |
| Maura & Alexander | 6.0 | 6.0 | 6.5 | 6.5 | 25.0 | "One Night Only" | Dreamgirls | Safe |
| Ben & Carlotta | 6.0 | 6.0 | 6.0 | 6.0 | 24.0 | "Sandy" | Grease | Safe |
| Joe & Alexandra | 5.5 | 5.0 | 5.0 | 5.0 | 20.5 | "If I Only Had a Brain" & "We're Off to See the Wizard" | The Wizard of Oz | Safe |
| Libby & Mark | 7.0 | 7.0 | 7.0 | 7.0 | 28.0 | "Memory" | Cats | Safe |
| Radzi & Jess | 6.5 | 6.0 | 6.0 | 6.0 | 24.5 | "I'm a Believer" | Shrek The Musical | Safe |
| H & Matt | 7.0 | 6.5 | 6.5 | 6.5 | 26.5 | "The Other Side" | The Greatest Showman | Safe |
| Perri & Vanessa | 8.0 | 8.0 | 8.0 | 8.0 | 32.0 | "I Just Can't Wait to Be King" | The Lion King | Safe |

Save Me skates

- Kevin & Brianne: "I'd Do Anything for Love (But I Won't Do That)" — Meat Loaf
- Lucrezia & Brendyn: "Landslide" — Fleetwood Mac

Judges' votes to save

- Banjo: Kevin & Brianne
- Barrowman: Lucrezia & Brendyn
- Torvill: Kevin & Brianne
- Dean: Kevin & Brianne

=== Week 4 (26 January) ===
Torvill & Dean performance: "Just the Two of Us" — José James

Due to Alexandra Schauman's injury, Joe Swash performed with Alex Murphy this week. Caprice performed with Oscar Peter as her new partner this week after "parting ways" with Hamish Gaman.

Couples are listed in the order they performed.

| Couple | Judges' scores | | | | Total score | Music | Result |
| Couple | Banjo | Barrowman | Torvill | Dean | Total score | Music | Result |
|---|---|---|---|---|---|---|---|
| H & Matt | 6.5 | 7.0 | 7.0 | 7.5 | 28.0 | "I Don't Feel Like Dancin'" — Scissor Sisters | Safe |
| Maura & Alexander | 6.0 | 6.5 | 6.5 | 6.0 | 25.0 | "Say You Love Me" — Jessie Ware | Safe |
| Ben & Carlotta | 7.0 | 7.5 | 7.0 | 7.0 | 28.5 | "Star Girl" — McFly | Safe |
| Libby & Mark | 6.5 | 7.0 | 7.5 | 7.0 | 28.0 | "No Excuses" — Meghan Trainor | Safe |
| Lisa & Tom | 8.0 | 8.0 | 8.0 | 8.0 | 32.0 | "Delilah" — Tom Jones | Safe |
| Radzi & Jess | 6.0 | 6.0 | 5.5 | 5.5 | 23.0 | "Your Song" — Elton John | Eliminated |
| Perri & Vanessa | 8.0 | 8.5 | 8.5 | 8.5 | 33.5 | "Señorita" — Shawn Mendes & Camila Cabello | Safe |
| Kevin & Brianne | 5.5 | 5.5 | 5.0 | 5.0 | 21.0 | "Should I Stay or Should I Go" — The Clash | Safe |
| Caprice & Oscar | 6.0 | 6.5 | 6.0 | 6.5 | 25.0 | "Mickey" — Toni Basil | Bottom two |
| Joe & Alex | 7.0 | 6.5 | 6.5 | 7.0 | 27.0 | "Nice to Meet Ya" — Niall Horan | Safe |

Save Me skates

- Radzi & Jess: "The Greatest" — Sia
- Caprice & Oscar: "Glamorous" — Fergie, feat. Ludacris

Judges' votes to save

- Banjo: Caprice & Oscar
- Barrowman: Caprice & Oscar
- Dean: Caprice & Oscar
- Torvill: Did not need to vote, but would have voted for Caprice & Oscar

=== Week 5 (2 February) ===
Theme: Fairy Tales
Guest performance: Disney on Ice

Caprice & Oscar Peter withdrew from the competition prior to the live show. Alexandra Schauman had to withdraw due to injury. During the live show, it was announced that Murphy would be Swash's permanent partner from now on. Due to an illness, Libby Clegg and Mark Hanretty did not compete in the live show.

Couples are listed in the order they performed.

| Couple | Judges' scores | | | | Total score | Music | Result |
| Couple | Banjo | Barrowman | Torvill | Dean | Total score | Music | Result |
|---|---|---|---|---|---|---|---|
| Lisa & Tom | 6.5 | 6.5 | 7.0 | 7.0 | 27.0 | "It's Oh So Quiet" — Björk | Safe |
| Ben & Carlotta | 7.5 | 7.5 | 7.5 | 7.5 | 30.0 | "Hung Up" — Madonna | Safe |
| H & Matt | 7.0 | 7.0 | 7.5 | 7.5 | 29.0 | "One Day I'll Fly Away" — Randy Crawford | Bottom two |
| Kevin & Brianne | 5.5 | 5.5 | 5.5 | 6.0 | 22.5 | "Abracadabra" — Steve Miller Band | Eliminated |
| Maura & Alexander | 7.0 | 7.0 | 7.0 | 7.0 | 28.0 | "She Wolf" — Shakira | Safe |
| Joe & Alex | 7.5 | 7.5 | 7.0 | 7.5 | 29.5 | "Hero" — Enrique Iglesias | Safe |
| Perri & Vanessa | 9.0 | 8.5 | 8.5 | 9.0 | 35.0 | "Stone Cold" — Demi Lovato | Safe |

Save Me skates

- H & Matt: "Sweet Disposition" — The Temper Trap
- Kevin & Brianne: "I'd Do Anything for Love (But I Won't Do That)" — Meat Loaf

Judges' votes to save

- Banjo: H & Matt
- Barrowman: H & Matt
- Torvill: H & Matt
- Dean: Did not need to vote, but would have voted for H & Matt

=== Week 6 (9 February) ===
Theme: Dance Week
Group Performances:

- "Let’s Nacho" — from Kapoor & Sons, "Some Days You Gotta Dance" — The Ranch, "Dance with Me" — Debelah Morgan & "Fireball" — Pitbull, feat. John Ryan (performed by professional skaters)
- "Primavera" — Ludovico Einaudi (performed by professional skaters)

Couples are listed in the order they performed.

| Couple | Judges' scores | | | | Total score | Music | Dance style | Result |
| Couple | Banjo | Barrowman | Torvill | Dean | Total score | Music | Dance style | Result |
|---|---|---|---|---|---|---|---|---|
| Joe & Alex | 8.0 | 8.0 | 8.0 | 8.0 | 32.0 | "Boogie Wonderland" — Earth, Wind & Fire, feat. The Emotions | Disco | Safe |
| H & Matt | 7.0 | 7.5 | 7.5 | 7.5 | 29.5 | "Fever" — Michael Bublé | Jazz | Eliminated |
| Libby & Mark | 8.0 | 8.0 | 8.5 | 8.5 | 33.0 | "I Like It Like That" — Pete Rodriguez | Salsa | Safe |
| Lisa & Tom | 7.5 | 7.5 | 7.5 | 7.5 | 30.0 | "Hot Honey Rag" — from Chicago | Charleston | Safe |
| Perri & Vanessa | 9.5 | 9.5 | 9.5 | 9.5 | 38.0 | "Johnny B. Goode" — Chuck Berry | Jive | Safe |
| Ben & Carlotta | 7.5 | 7.5 | 8.0 | 8.0 | 31.0 | "Little Talks" — Of Monsters And Men | Morris | Bottom two |
| Maura & Alexander | 7.5 | 7.5 | 7.5 | 8.0 | 30.5 | "Don't Let Me Be Misunderstood" — Santa Esmeralda | Flamenco | Safe |

Save Me skates

- H & Matt: "Sweet Disposition" — The Temper Trap
- Ben & Carlotta: "Leave a Light On" — Tom Walker

Judges' votes to save

- Banjo: Ben & Carlotta
- Barrowman: Ben & Carlotta
- Dean: Ben & Carlotta
- Torvill: Did not need to vote, but would have voted for Ben & Carlotta

=== Week 7 (16 February) ===
Theme: Prop Week
Group performance: "Spectrum (Say My Name)" — Florence and the Machine

Couples are listed in the order they performed.

| Couple | Judges' scores | | | | Total score | Music | Prop | Result |
| Couple | Banjo | Barrowman | Torvill | Dean | Total score | Music | Prop | Result |
|---|---|---|---|---|---|---|---|---|
| Libby & Mark | 8.5 | 8.5 | 8.5 | 8.0 | 33.5 | "A Thousand Miles" — Vanessa Carlton | Suitcase | Bottom two |
| Joe & Alex | 8.5 | 8.5 | 8.5 | 8.5 | 34.0 | "Candy" — Robbie Williams | Candy cane | Safe |
| Maura & Alexander | 7.5 | 7.5 | 7.5 | 7.5 | 30.0 | "The Boy Does Nothing" — Alesha Dixon | Broom | Eliminated |
| Ben & Carlotta | 9.0 | 9.0 | 9.0 | 9.0 | 36.0 | "Summer Holiday" — Cliff Richard & The Shadows | Umbrella | Safe |
| Lisa & Tom | 8.0 | 7.5 | 8.0 | 8.0 | 31.5 | "La Vie en rose" — Louis Armstrong | Chair | Safe |
| Perri & Vanessa | 9.5 | 9.5 | 9.5 | 9.5 | 38.0 | "The Rockafeller Skank" — Fatboy Slim | Shopping trolley | Safe |

Save Me skates

- Libby & Mark: "Skyscraper" — Demi Lovato
- Maura & Alexander: "Stay" — Rihanna

Judges' votes to save

- Banjo: Maura & Alexander
- Barrowman: Maura & Alexander
- Torvill: Libby & Mark
- Dean: Libby & Mark (Since the other judges were not unanimous, Dean, as head judge, made the final decision to save Libby & Mark)

=== Week 8 (23 February) ===
Theme: Movie Week
Group performances:

- "Shake a Tail Feather" — from The Blues Brothers, "Married Life" — from Up, "Theme from Mission: Impossible" — from Mission: Impossible & "(I've Had) The Time of My Life" — from Dirty Dancing (performed by professional skaters)
- "Footloose" — from Footloose (Skate Battle)

Couples are listed in the order they performed.

| Couple | Judges' scores | | | | Total score | Solo Skate Battle | Music | Film | Result |
| Couple | Banjo | Barrowman | Torvill | Dean | Total score | Solo Skate Battle | Music | Film | Result |
|---|---|---|---|---|---|---|---|---|---|
| Joe & Alex | 8.5 | 8.5 | 8.5 | 8.5 | 34.0 | 2 pts. | "Live and Let Die" | Live and Let Die | Safe |
| Libby & Mark | 9.0 | 8.5 | 9.0 | 9.0 | 35.5 | 3 pts. | "The Bare Necessities" | The Jungle Book | Bottom two |
| Perri & Vanessa | 10.0 | 10.0 | 10.0 | 9.5 | 39.5 | 5 pts. | "Hedwig's Theme" | Harry Potter and the Philosopher's Stone | Safe |
| Lisa & Tom | 7.5 | 8.0 | 8.0 | 8.0 | 31.5 | 1 pt. | "Have You Met Miss Jones?" | Bridget Jones's Diary | Eliminated |
| Ben & Carlotta | 9.0 | 9.5 | 9.5 | 9.0 | 37.0 | 4 pts. | "My Heart Will Go On" | Titanic | Safe |

Save Me skates

- Libby & Mark: "Skyscraper" — Demi Lovato
- Lisa & Tom: "Never Tear Us Apart" — Paloma Faith

Judges' votes to save

- Banjo: Libby & Mark
- Barrowman: Libby & Mark
- Dean: Libby & Mark
- Torvill: Did not need to vote, but would have voted for Libby & Mark

=== Week 9: Semifinals (1 March) ===
Group performances:

- "Do Your Thing" — Basement Jaxx
- Cirque du Soleil: Crystal

Each couple performed two routines. Couples are listed in the order they performed.

| Couple | Order | Judges' scores | | | | Total score | Music | Result |
| Couple | Order | Banjo | Barrowman | Torvill | Dean | Total score | Music | Result |
|---|---|---|---|---|---|---|---|---|
| Ben & Carlotta | 1 | 9.0 | 9.5 | 9.5 | 9.5 | 74.5 | "Ain't That a Kick in the Head?" — Dean Martin | Eliminated |
| Ben & Carlotta | 6 | 9.0 | 9.5 | 9.0 | 9.5 | 74.5 | "Lightning Bolt" — Jake Bugg | Eliminated |
| Libby & Mark | 2 | 9.5 | 9.5 | 10.0 | 10.0 | 77.5 | "Paradise" — George Ezra | Bottom two |
| Libby & Mark | 5 | 9.5 | 10.0 | 9.5 | 9.5 | 77.5 | "I'm Gonna Be (500 Miles)" — Sleeping at Last | Bottom two |
| Perri & Vanessa | 3 | 9.0 | 9.5 | 10.0 | 10.0 | 78.5 | "Let's Go Crazy" — Prince & The Revolution | Safe |
| Perri & Vanessa | 7 | 10.0 | 10.0 | 10.0 | 10.0 | 78.5 | "Balcony Scene" — from Romeo + Juliet | Safe |
| Joe & Alex | 4 | 9.5 | 9.5 | 9.5 | 9.5 | 76.0 | "Da Ya Think I'm Sexy?" — Rod Stewart | Safe |
| Joe & Alex | 8 | 9.5 | 9.5 | 9.5 | 9.5 | 76.0 | "Stars" — Simply Red | Safe |

Save Me skates

- Ben & Carlotta: "Leave a Light On" — Tom Walker
- Libby & Mark: "Reet Petite" — Jackie Wilson

Judges' votes to save

- Banjo: Libby & Mark
- Barrowman: Ben & Carlotta
- Torvill: Libby & Mark
- Dean: Libby & Mark

=== Week 10: Final (8 March) ===
Group performance: "These Days" — Take That
Torvill & Dean performance: "One Day Like This" — Elbow

Each couple performed two routines. Couples are listed in the order they performed.

| Couple | Order | Judges' scores | | | | Total score | Music | Public vote | Pts. | Boléro | Pts. | Result |
| Couple | Order | Banjo | Barrowman | Torvill | Dean | Total score | Music | Public vote | Pts. | Boléro | Pts. | Result |
|---|---|---|---|---|---|---|---|---|---|---|---|---|
| Joe & Alex | 1 | 10.0 | 10.0 | 10.0 | 10.0 | 80.0 | "Walking the Dog" — from Shall We Dance, "Persecution Music" — The Harmony Group & "Smile" — from Modern Times | 43.20% | 3 | 50.53% | 2 | Winners |
| Joe & Alex | 5 | 10.0 | 10.0 | 10.0 | 10.0 | 80.0 | "Nice to Meet Ya" — Niall Horan | 43.20% | 3 | 50.53% | 2 | Winners |
| Perri & Vanessa | 2 | 10.0 | 10.0 | 10.0 | 10.0 | 80.0 | "Skip to the Good Bit" — Rizzle Kicks | 41.48% | 2 | 49.47% | 1 | Runners-up |
| Perri & Vanessa | 4 | 10.0 | 10.0 | 10.0 | 10.0 | 80.0 | "Señorita" — Shawn Mendes & Camila Cabello | 41.48% | 2 | 49.47% | 1 | Runners-up |
| Libby & Mark | 3 | 10.0 | 10.0 | 10.0 | 10.0 | 80.0 | "Chariots of Fire" — from Chariots of Fire & "Reach" — Gloria Estefan | 15.31% | 1 | —N/a | | Third place |
| Libby & Mark | 6 | 10.0 | 10.0 | 10.0 | 10.0 | 80.0 | "The Bare Necessities" — from The Jungle Book | 15.31% | 1 | —N/a | | Third place |

== Ratings ==
Official ratings are taken from BARB. Viewing figures are from 7 day data.

| Episode | Date | Total viewers (millions) |
|---|---|---|
| Live show 1 | 5 January | 5.87 |
| Live show 2 | 12 January | 5.08 |
| Live show 3 | 19 January | 5.05 |
| Live show 4 | 26 January | 5.04 |
| Live show 5 | 2 February | 5.11 |
| Live show 6 | 9 February | 5.31 |
| Live show 7 | 16 February | 5.24 |
| Live show 8 | 23 February | 5.00 |
| Live show 9 | 1 March | 4.80 |
| Live show 10 | 8 March | 5.16 |
