= List of Dancing on Ice professional skaters =

Professional skaters from the British television show Dancing on Ice are figure skaters who appear with celebrities in front of a panel of judges. Most of the professionals on the series are former ice dancers or pair skaters.

== Competitive appearances ==
If the skater competed at a given international event, the highest placement is indicated. All information relates to senior-level events, except the World Junior Championships. The European Championships is for skaters from Europe, while the Four Continents Championships is for skaters from the other continents.

Those not included in the table below have no senior national medals to their name and did not compete in any ISU Championship or Grand Prix events.

Professional skater	Winter Olympics	World Championships	European Championships or Four Continents	ISU Grand Prix	World Junior Championships	National Championships	Ref.
Viktoria Borzenkova	—N/a	2002; 15th place	2002 Europeans; 7th place	2004 Trophée Éric Bompard & 2005 NHK Trophy; 4th place	—N/a		
Brooke Castile	—N/a	2008; 11th place	2008 Four Continents bronze medalist	2009 Skate America; 6th place	—N/a	2007 U.S. Champion	
Annette Dytrt	—N/a	2008; 12th place	2009 Europeans; 7th place	2004 Cup of Russia; 5th place	1999; 18th place	1999 Czech Champion & 5x German Champion	
Matt Evers	—N/a			1998 Skate Canada; 7th place	—N/a		
Amani Fancy	—N/a	2015; 16th place	2015 Europeans; 12th place	2015 NHK Trophy; 8th place	2013; 41st place	2x British Champion	
Maria Filippov	—N/a	1991; 25th place	—N/a				
Hamish Gaman	—N/a		2015 Europeans; 9th place	—N/a	2004; 14th place	2015 British Champion	
Isabelle Gauthier	—N/a				1996; 15th place	—N/a	
Colin Grafton	—N/a				2012; 8th place	—N/a	
Mark Hanretty	—N/a	2010; 23rd place	2009 Europeans; 18th place	—N/a			
Jodeyne Higgins	—N/a	1993; 10th place	—N/a	1995 Skate Canada bronze medalist	—N/a		
Marika Humphreys	15th	14th	11th	6th	—N/a	5x British Champion	
Vanessa James	2018; 5th place	2018 & 2022 bronze medalist	2019 Europeans gold medalist	2018 Internationaux de France, 2018 Skate Canada & 2018–19 GP Final gold medalist	2007; 27th place	2006 British Champion & 7x French Champion	
Sylvain Longchambon	—N/a			2002 Cup of Russia; 11th place	—N/a		
Pamela O'Connor	—N/a	19th	14th	—N/a		2003 British Champion	
Tippy Packard	—N/a	2011; 44th place	2011 Four Continents; 25th place	—N/a		3x Hong Kong Champion	
Oscar Peter	—N/a	24th	20th	—N/a		3x Swiss Champion	
Simon Proulx-Sénécal	2022; 18th place	2011; 14th place	2022 Europeans; 13th place	—N/a		2016 Armenian Champion	
Sean Rice	—N/a	1993; 10th place	—N/a	1995 Skate Canada bronze medalist	—N/a		
Łukasz Różycki	—N/a				1998; 16th place	—N/a	
Todd Sand	1994; 5th place	1998 silver medalist	1982 & 1983 Europeans; 19th place	1996 NHK Trophy gold medalist	—N/a	2x Danish Champion & 4x U.S. Champion	
Olga Sharutenko	—N/a			6th	1995 gold medalist	—N/a	
Olivia Smart	2022 8th place	2022 7th place	2022 Europeans 4th place	2021 Skate Canada bronze medalist	2014 10th place	3x Spanish Champion	
Nina Ulanova	—N/a			11th	1997 gold medalist	—N/a	
Michael Zenezini	—N/a				1998; 5th place	—N/a	

== Current skaters ==
=== Vanessa Bauer ===
Vanessa Bauer was born on 23 May 1996 in Berlin, Germany. Skating in partnership with Nolan Seegert, she became the German national junior pairs' champion at the 2013 German Figure Skating Championships. The pair was not selected for the 2013 World Junior Championships. Bauer has no senior national medals to her name and did not compete in any ISU Championships. Following the end of her competitive years, she went on to work for Willy Bietak Productions, Inc, and Royal Caribbean. Working on board Royal Caribbean's Harmony of the Seas, she performed in their Iskate and 1887 shows.

After working numerous contracts with Royal Caribbean, she moved to London in late 2017 and joined the ITV show as a professional skater. She was partnered with Jake Quickenden for her first season on the series. The two were named the winners, ahead of Brooke Vincent and Matej Silecky. In series 11, Bauer's second series on the show, she was partnered with Love Island star Wes Nelson, ending up as runner-up to James Jordan and Alexandra Schauman. In series 12, she was partnered with Diversity dancer, Perri Kiely, again ending up as runner-up, this time to Joe Swash and Alex Murphy. In series 13 she was paired with Emmerdale actor Joe-Warren Plant but they were forced to withdraw on 12 February due to them testing positive for COVID-19. In series 14, she was partnered with Brendan Cole, where she once again ended up as runner-up, this time to Regan Gascoigne and Karina Manta. In series 15, she was partnered with Joey Essex and was for the fourth time a runner-up in the competition. In series 16, she was paired with Miles Nazaire, and again finished as the runner-up. For series 17, she was paired with Chris Taylor but had to withdraw due to an injury and was subsequently replaced by Robin Johnstone.

=== Andy Buchanan ===
Andrew Buchanan did not appear in any ISU Championship or Grand Prix events. He was paired with Anthea Turner in series 8, Zaraah Abrahams in series 9, Rebekah Vardy in series 13 and Stef Reid in series 14. After a series break, he returned for series 16 and was paired with Hannah Spearritt. They were the second couple to be eliminated. In series 17, he was paired with Chelsee Healey.

=== Annette Dytrt ===
Annette Dytrt (born 7 September 1983) is a German figure skater who competed internationally for the Germany and the Czech Republic. She is the 1999 Czech national champion and the 2003–06 German national champion. She joined the show in series 16 and was paired with actor Ricky Norwood. They were the sixth couple to be eliminated. For series 17, she was paired with footballer and pundit Anton Ferdinand.

=== Colin Grafton ===
Colin Grafton (born 19 September 1991) is an American pair skater. He is the 2012 U.S. junior bronze medalist and finished eighth at the 2012 World Junior Championships in Minsk. He joined as a professional in fourteenth series; however did not receive a partner until the fifteenth series, when he was partnered with The Vivienne and they finished in third place. For series 16, he was paired with actress Claire Sweeney and the pair were third to be eliminated. In series 17, he was paired with Mollie Pearce.

=== Mark Hanretty ===
Mark Hanretty (born 21 March 1985 in Glasgow) is a Scottish ice dancer. With Christina Chitwood, he is a two-time senior bronze medalist at the British Championships and competed at the 2010 World Championships, where they placed 23rd. He appeared in series 6 with Nadia Sawalha and series 7 with Rosemary Conley. He was paired with Oona King in series 8. Hanretty returned to the show in its 10th series with actress and television presenter Donna Air, they were eliminated in week 7. For the 2019 series, he was paired with Saira Khan. In series 12, he was partnered with paralympic sprinter, Libby Clegg, finishing in 3rd place of the competition. For series 13 he was paired with Reality TV star Billie Shepherd but they withdrew from the competition on 6 February when Billie missed out on two weeks of the competition, one due to a family bereavement and another to Billie suffering a head injury in rehearsals. For series 14, he was paired with Kimberly Wyatt and they finished in third place. In series 15, he was paired with Carley Stenson and they were the sixth couple to be eliminated. In series 16, he was paired with Adele Roberts and they finished in third place. Prior to the start of series 17, in October 2024 5 confirmed it would be his final series as a professional; he was paired with Michaela Strachan.

=== Brendyn Hatfield ===
Brendyn Hatfield (born 4 January 1986) is an American skater. Prior to Dancing on Ice, he was in Disney on Ice and Holiday on Ice. He was partnered with Lucrezia Millarini for the series 12 and they were the second couple to be eliminated. In series 13, he was paired with rapper Lady Leshurr. In series 14, he was paired with Rachel Stevens. In series 15, he was paired with Ekin-Su Cülcüloğlu. They were the third couple to be eliminated. For series 16, he was paired with stand-up comedian Lou Sanders and they were the fifth couple to be eliminated. Hatfield confirmed in October 2024 that the upcoming 17th series would be his last as a professional; for that series he was paired with television personality Ferne McCann.

=== Vanessa James ===
Vanessa James (born 27 September 1987) is a Canadian pair skater. She is the 2019 European Champion, the 2018 World bronze medallist, the 2017 European bronze medallist, the 2018 Grand Prix Final champion, and a seven-time French national champion. James also represented Canada at the 2022 Winter Olympics. She joined the show as a professional in series 16 and was paired with Olympic long jumper Greg Rutherford. They reached the final however were forced to withdraw after Rutherford sustained an injury. She returned for series 17 and was paired with Dan Edgar.

=== Robin Johnstone ===
Robin Johnstone did not appear in any ISU Championship or Grand Prix events. She was paired with Gareth Thomas in series 8, but she withdrew in week 9 due to Gareth's sickness and Joe Pasquale in series 9. Robin returned for the 2021 series, and was partnered with Rufus Hound but withdrew on 3 February after Rufus came in contact with someone who tested positive for COVID-19. They were replaced by Matt Richardson who made his debut in the competition in week 4 but left the same week. In series 14, she was paired with rugby player Ben Foden but they were eliminated first. After a series break, Johnstone returned for series 16 where she was paired with professional boxer Ricky Hatton. They were eliminated first. She returned for series 17 as a replacement partner for Chris Taylor after his original partner Vanessa Bauer withdrew due to injury.

=== Molly Lanaghan ===
Molly Lanaghan is an English figure skater from Doncaster. With Dmirtre Razgulajevs, she has appeared at various national and international ice dance events. She joined the show in series 17 and was paired with Coronation Street actor Sam Aston.

=== Sylvain Longchambon ===
Sylvain Longchambon is a French ice dancer. With Caroline Truong, he won bronze at the 2002 French Championships and competed for two years on the senior international level. He appeared in series 6 with Jennifer Metcalfe. He was due to appear in series 7 with Heidi Range, but due to injury had to pull out. He was paired with Samia Ghadie, whom he later married and had a son with, in series 8 and Jorgie Porter in series 9. He returned to the show when it was revived for its 10th series in 2018, he partnered Stephanie Waring, they were eliminated in 11th place. For the 11th series he was paired with Jane Danson. Longchambon returned for series 15 and was paired with Coronation Street actress Mollie Gallagher, and they were eliminated in the semi-final. For series 16, he was paired with Emmerdale actress Roxy Shahidi. They were the fourth couple to be eliminated. In series 17, he was due to be paired with paralympian Sarah Storey however Storey had been forced to withdraw from the competition due to injury.

=== Vicky Ogden ===
Vicky Ogden is from Milton Keynes. She has no senior national medals to her name and did not compete in any ISU Championships. She appeared in series 7 with Andy Whyment and in series 8 with Joe Pasquale. In series 9, she was partnered with Sam Attwater whom she married in 2014. She temporarily returned for series 13, where she was partnered with Matt Richardson, joining the competition in week 4 after Rufus Hound and his partner Robin Johnstone were forced to withdraw from the competition but left the same week. For the fifteenth series, she did not receive a partner however took part in professional group routines and was used as a reserve. In series 16, Ogden was a replacement partner for Eddie the Eagle after Tippy Packard sustained an injury. They were the seventh couple to be eliminated. For series 17, she was paired with Olympic rower Steve Redgrave.

=== Eric Radford ===
Eric Radford (born January 27, 1985) is a Canadian pair skater. With former partner Meagan Duhamel, he is a two-time world champion (2015, 2016), a 2018 Olympic gold medallist in the team event, a 2014 Olympic silver medallist in the team event, a 2018 Olympic bronze medallist in the pairs event, a two-time Four Continents champion (2013, 2015), the 2014–15 Grand Prix Final champion, and a seven-time Canadian national champion (2012–18). He is also the first openly gay man to have won a gold medal at any Winter Olympics. He joined the show in series 17 and was paired with EastEnders actress Charlie Brooks.

== Former skaters ==
=== Pavel Aubrecht ===
Pavel Aubrecht is a Czech skater. He has no senior national medals to his name and did not appear in any ISU Championship or Grand Prix events. He appeared in series 2 with Ulrika Jonsson, series 3 with Samantha Mumba, series 4 with Jessica Taylor, and series 5 with Sharron Davies.

=== Victoria Borzenkova ===
Viktoria Borzenkova (born 25 December 1981 in Saint Petersburg) is a Russian pair skater. With Andrei Chuvilaev, she finished as high as fourth at the senior Russian Championships and competed once at the World Championships, placing 15th in 2002. She appeared in the third series, partnered with Tim Vincent.

=== Brooke Castile ===
Brooke Castile (born 31 May 1986 in Detroit, Michigan) is an American pair skater. With Benjamin Okolski, she is the 2007 U.S. senior national champion, 2008 Four Continents bronze medalist, and competed twice at the World Championships, placing as high as 11th. She appeared in series 7, partnered with Corey Feldman.

=== Brianne Delcourt ===
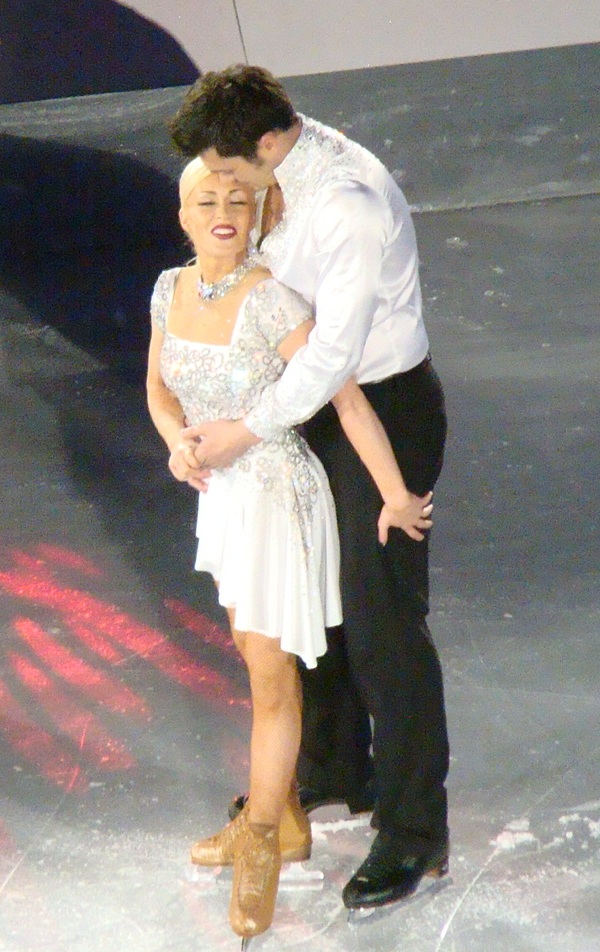
Delcourt with Sam Attwater on the Dancing on Ice tour in 2011.

Brianne Delcourt (born 2 February 1981 in Ontario) is a Canadian pair skater. With partner CJ Pugh, she placed 8th in novice pairs at the 1997 Canadian Championships. She has no senior national medals to her name and did not appear in any ISU Championship or Grand Prix events. Delcourt began skating in shows in September 2001, performing adagio routines with Nicholas Keagan and Gord Willemse.

She made her first appearance on Dancing on Ice in series 5, finishing third with Hollyoaks actor Kieron Richardson. Delcourt and EastEnders actor Sam Attwater were the winners of series 6. In series 7, she was partnered with Sébastien Foucan, with whom she was eliminated in week 7. In series 8, she was paired with another EastEnders actor, Matt Lapinskas, and came second. Delcourt was paired with Gareth Gates for series 9. Delcourt returned to Dancing on Ice when the show returned for its tenth series in January 2018, where she partnered Good Morning Britain's weatherman, Alex Beresford. She was partnered with actor Mark Little for the 2019 series, they were eliminated in week 2. In series 12, she was partnered with footballer and now husband, Kevin Kilbane. On 19 July 2020, it was announced that Delcourt would not return for the 2021 series.

=== Alexander Demetriou ===
Alexander Demetriou was announced as a new professional skater for the 11th series in 2019, alongside wife Carlotta. Demetriou has no senior national medals to his name and did not compete in any ISU Championships. Demetriou was partnered with former Pussycat Dolls member Melody Thornton for the 2019 series. They were eliminated in Week 8, placing 5th. In series 12, he was partnered with Love Island finalist Maura Higgins but were eliminated in week 7, placing 6th. In August 2020, it was announced that Demetriou and Edwards would be dropped from the main professional skater lineup for the thirteenth series.

=== Carlotta Edwards ===
Carlotta Edwards from Canada was announced as a new professional skater for the 11th series in 2019, alongside husband Alexander Demetriou. She has no senior national medals to her name and did not compete in any ISU Championships. She was partnered with actor Richard Blackwood for her first series on the show. They were eliminated in week 3. In series 12, she was partnered with magician and presenter, Ben Hanlin but were eliminated during the semi-final, placing 4th. In August 2020, it was announced that Edwards and Demetriou would be dropped from the main professional skater lineup for the thirteenth series.

=== Angela Egan ===
Angela Egan is a Scottish ice dancer. She began appearing as a professional in series 13. She later won this series on 14 March 2021 with her celebrity partner, Sonny Jay. She is one of four professionals to win their first series. In series 14, she was paired with Happy Mondays dancer Bez.

=== Matt Evers ===
Matt Evers (born 16 March 1976 in Saint Paul, Minnesota) is an American pair skater. With Heather Allebach, he won the 1998 U.S. junior national title and competed at two senior Grand Prix events. He has appeared in every series of Dancing on Ice: Series 1 with Bonnie Langford, series 2 with Lisa Scott-Lee, series 3 with Suzanne Shaw (winner), series 4 with Zöe Salmon, series 5 with Heather Mills, series 6 with Denise Welch, and series 7 with Jorgie Porter (runner up) In series 8, he and partner Pamela Anderson were the first eliminated. He was paired with Suzanne Shaw for series 9. He returned to Dancing on Ice for its tenth series where he was paired with the Great British Bake Off winner, Candice Brown. They were eliminated first. In series 11, he was partnered with The Only Way Is Essex star Gemma Collins. They were the fifth couple to be eliminated in week 6. In series 12, he became part of the first same-sex couple in Dancing on Ice history when he paired up with Steps singer Ian "H" Watkins. In series 13, he was partnered with Denise van Outen however they withdrew from the competition due to injury. However, in week 6 of the competition, Evers returned a replacement partner for Faye Brookes after her original partner Hamish Gaman withdrew due to injury. In series 14, Evers was paired with Coronation Street actress Sally Dynevor, they were eliminated in week 7. For series 15, he was paired with former EastEnders actress and DJ Patsy Palmer. In October 2023, Evers announced his departure from the show and as a result would not return for series 16. Having competed in every series of the show since its inception until series 15, Evers is the longest serving professional skater in Dancing on Ice history.

=== Amani Fancy ===
Amani Fancy (born 14 July 1997) is an English pair skater. She is a 2015 CS Tallinn Trophy bronze medalist and a two-time British national champion in both 2014 and 2016. She was also professional on the German version of the show, which she won in 2019. She joined the show for series 16 and was paired with Coronation Street actor Ryan Thomas. They went on to win the series.

=== Maria Filippov ===
Maria Filippov (born 20 June 1973 as Maria Hadjiiska) Bulgarian ice dancer. With Hristo Nikolov, she competed once at the World Championships in 1991 but did not reach the free dance. She has appeared seven times on Dancing on Ice: Series 2 with Duncan James, series 3 with Gareth Gates with whom she reached the semi-final, series 4 with Ray Quinn (winner), series 5 with Gary Lucy, series 6 with Craig McLachlan (eliminated first), series 7 with Andy Akinwolere, series 8 with Shayne Ward (eliminated 5th), and in series 9 with Ray Quinn, with whom she won again.

=== Hamish Gaman ===
Hamish Gaman (born 20 April 1983) is an English pair skater. With partner Caitlin Yankowskas, he is the 2015 Challenge Cup silver medalist and 2015 British national champion. They were included in the British team to the 2015 European Championships, where they finished 9th. Gaman was announced as a new professional skater for the revived series in 2018. He partnered athlete Perri Shakes-Drayton in 2018, finishing in 10th place. For the 2019 series, he was paired with singer Saara Aalto, finishing in third place. In series 12, he was paired with model and actress, Caprice, however they parted ways in Week 3, and Caprice was re-partnered with Oscar Peter from Week 4 onwards. In series 13, he was paired with Coronation Street actress, Faye Brookes, however Gaman was forced to withdraw from the competition in week 6, and Brookes was re-partnered with Matt Evers.

=== Isabelle Gauthier ===
Isabelle Gauthier (born 2 April 1980) is a Canadian pairs skater who competed once at Junior Worlds, placing 15th in 1996 and retired from competition after finishing 9th on the junior level at the 2000 Canadian Championships. She appeared in series 6 with Jeff Brazier.

=== Matthew Gonzalez ===
Matthew Gonzalez (born 1 October 1986 in Baltimore, Maryland) is an American roller skater who later took up pair skating. He has no senior national medals to his name and did not compete in any ISU Championship or Grand Prix events. He appeared in series 5 with Eastenders actress Danniella Westbrook and series 7 with Dallas actress Charlene Tilton.

=== Jess Hatfield ===
Jessica Hatfield is an American skater. Prior to Dancing on Ice, she was in Disney on Ice and Holiday on Ice. For series 12, she was paired with Radzi Chinyanganya.

=== Jodeyne Higgins ===
Jodeyne Higgins (born 26 September 1974) is a Canadian pairs skater. With husband Sean Rice, she is a two-time Canadian senior bronze medalist and placed as high as 10th at the World Championships in 1993. They also won four national titles in four skating. She appeared in series 6 with Johnson Beharry and series 7 with Chico Slimani.

=== Florentine Houdinière ===
Florentine Houdinière is a French former single skater who placed 13th (last) at the 1992 Grand Prix International de Paris. She appeared in series 4 with Donal MacIntyre (runner-up).

=== Marika Humphreys ===
Marika Humphreys-Baranova (born 3 January 1977 in Chester) is a British ice dancer who is a five-time British senior national champion with three partners. With husband Vitali Baranov, she also competed at the Olympics, placing 15th in 2002, and twice at the World Championships, placing 14th in 2002. She appeared in series 1 with Sean Wilson.

=== Ale Izquierdo ===
Ale Izquierdo is a Mexican skater. She did not compete in any ISU Championships or Grand Prix events. She was announced as a new professional skater for the revived series in 2018 and was paired with Max Evans.

=== Joe Johnson ===
Joseph Johnson (born 5 May 1994) is an American ice dancer. He began appearing as a professional in series 13. He was paired with former Olympic artistic gymnast Amy Tinkler after Denise Van Outen withdrew due to her shoulder injury. They made their debut in the competition in week 3 but were eliminated in week 5. In series 14, Johnson was paired with Liberty Poole, they were also eliminated in week 5.

=== Klabera Komini ===
Klabera Komini (born 31 August 1994) is an American ice dancer. She began appearing as a professional in series 13. She was paired with former Olympic hurdler, Colin Jackson and placed 3rd. She returned for series 15 and was paired with Siva Kaneswaran.

=== Melanie Lambert ===
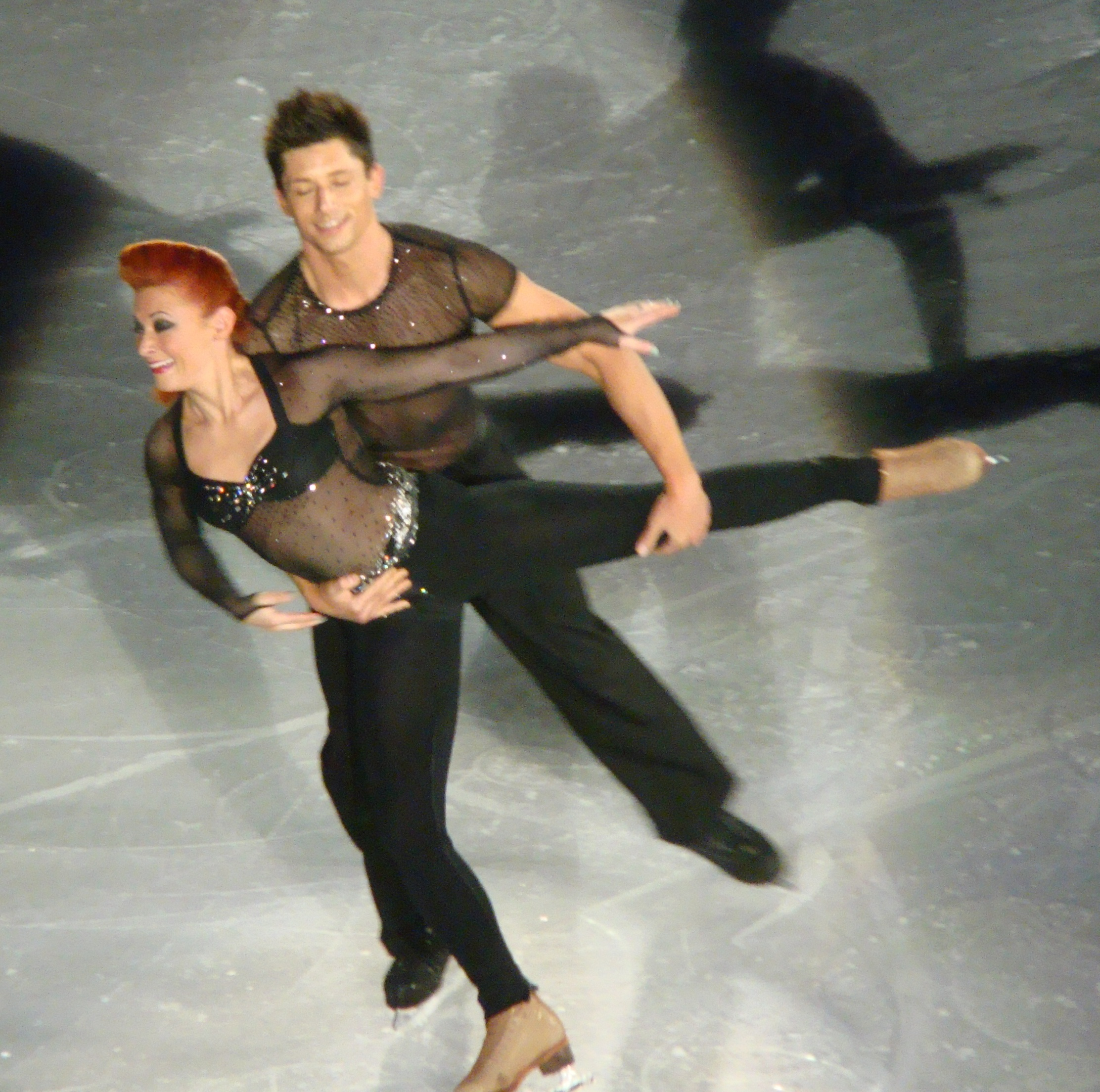
Lambert and Fred Palascak on the Dancing on Ice tour in 2010.

Melanie Lambert (born 30 June 1974 in Boston) is an American pair skater. She and Fred Palascak began skating together in 1994 and married in 2003. They placed 9th on the senior level at the 1996 U.S. national championships. They did not compete in any ISU Championship or Grand Prix events. She was partnered in series 2 with the eventual winner, Kyran Bracken In series 3, she appeared with Michael Underwood who withdrew after breaking his ankle in week 3 training. They reformed their partnership in series 4 and were voted off in week 4. In series 5, Lambert skated with Boyzone star Mikey Graham, who was voted off in week 9.

(with Palascak)

National
Event	1995	1996	1997
U.S. Championships	4th J.	9th	11th
Eastern Sectionals	1st J.	1st	2nd
U.S. Olympic Festival	4th		
J. = Junior level

=== Melody Le Moal ===
Melody Le Moal from France was announced as a new professional skater for the revived series in 2018. She has no senior national medals to her name and did not compete in any ISU Championships. She was partnered with singer Lemar.

=== Kristina Lenko ===
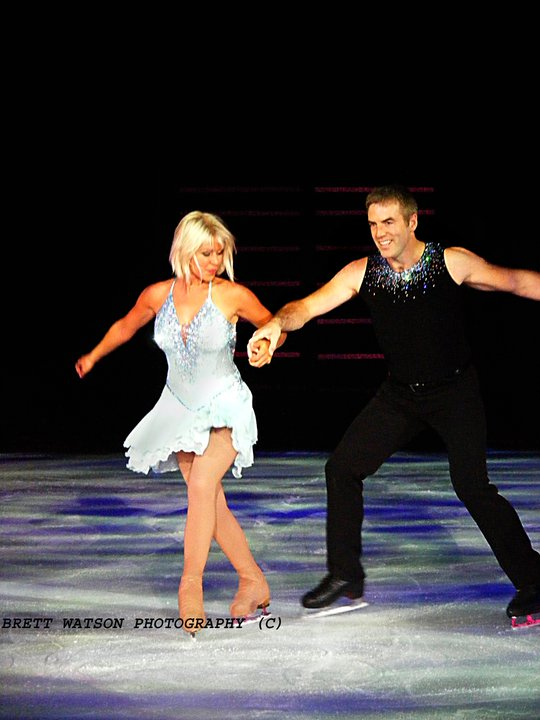
Kristina Lenko in 2009

Kristina Lenko (born 4 October 1980 in Meadow Lake, Saskatchewan) is a Canadian ice dancer. After competing on the junior level with Mitchell Park, she teamed up with Danny Moir to compete as a senior. They placed 8th at the 2003 Canadian national championships and 7th at the 2002 Golden Spin of Zagreb. She has no senior national medals to her name and did not appear in any ISU Championship or Grand Prix events. She appeared in series 1 with The Bill actor Stefan Booth, finishing as runners-up to Gaynor Faye and Daniel Whiston. Lenko also appeared in series 2 with Boyzone singer Stephen Gately, series 3 with tennis player Greg Rusedski, and series 4 with former Chelsea F.C. Graeme Le Saux. She skated with Matt Evers on the Dancing on Ice tour. In 2009, Lenko partnered with former hockey player Bob Probert on the Canadian show Battle of the Blades. She is the sister of Joanna Lenko.

=== Andrei Lipanov ===
Andrei Lipanov (Russian: Андрей Липанов; born 12 April 1976 in Saint Petersburg, Russia) is a Russian skater. He has no senior national medals to his name and did not compete in any ISU Championships. In 1998, he married Susie Lipanova, with whom he has a son, Sasha. In 2006, Lipanov and his partner, Belgian actress, model and presenter Kelly Pfaff, finished in third place in the Belgian/Dutch version of Dancing on Ice.

Lipanov joined the UK version for its second series, in 2007. He partnered actress Clare Buckfield, and achieved the joint top score of 29.5 (out of 30) twice in the finals. They were voted second by the British public, beaten by rugby player Kyran Bracken. In the third series, Lipanov was partnered with sports presenter Natalie Pinkham. They were voted off in week two of the competition, after being defeated by three votes to two in the skate-off against TV presenter Tim Vincent and his professional partner Victoria Borzenkova. In the fourth series, he and his partner, actress Gemma Bissix, were eliminated in week two. In series 5, he was partnered with So Macho pop singer Sinitta; they were eliminated in week one after losing the skate-off to Olympic swimmer Sharron Davies.

He didn't return in series 6 but he return in series 7 he was paired with Heidi Range after her original partner Sylvain Longchambon ruptured a bicep while lowering her from a lift before the series began. In series 9, he returned to be paired with Bonnie Langford, replacing her injured partner Mark Hanretty.

=== Susie Lipanova ===
Susie Lipanova (born Susan Humble on 6 June 1974) is a British skater from South Shields, South Tyneside, England. She was second in the British Junior Championships in 1990 and two years later finished fifth in the senior version. She did not compete in any ISU Championships. Lipanova is married to Andrei Lipanov with whom she has a son, Sasha. She appeared in series 3 with Olympic champion javelin thrower Steve Backley. They were the sixth to be eliminated after a skate-off against actress Zaraah Abrahams and Fred Palascak. In series 4, Lipanova partnered former EastEnders actor, Todd Carty. They were eliminated in week 5 after a skate-off with Ellery Hanley and Frankie Poultney. In series 5, Lipanova and her partner, actor Jeremy Sheffield, were eliminated at the end of the third round.

=== Brandee Malto ===
Brandee Malto from the United States was announced as a new professional skater for the revived series in 2018. She has no senior national medals to her name and did not compete in any ISU Championships. Her partner in 2018 was actor Antony Cotton and in 2019 was Ryan Sidebottom.

=== Sergey Malyshev ===
Sergey Malyshev has no senior national medals to his name and did not compete in any ISU Championships. He appeared in the first series with Tamara Beckwith, with whom he was voted off in the first week following a skate-off with the eventual series winner Gaynor Faye. He also skated in the third series with Aggie MacKenzie in the third series and was voted off in their first skate-off, held in week four of the competition.

=== Karina Manta ===
Karina Manta (born 20 March 1996) is an American ice dancer. She began appearing as a professional in series 13. She was paired with Graham Bell after his original partner Yebin Mok had to pull out due to injury. In series 14, Manta was paired with Regan Gascoigne and the pair went on to win the series.

=== Molly Moenkhoff ===
Molly Moenkhoff competed on the US Team and was an International Medalist. She appeared in series 5 with Bobby Davro.

=== Alex Murphy ===
Alexandra Destiny Klein (née Murphy; (born 1 February 1989 in Boston, Massachusetts) was announced as a new professional skater for the revived series in 2018. She is the reigning Dutch Dancing On Ice (Sterren Dansen op Het Ijs) champion. She partnered with Love Island star Kem Cetinay for her first series on the show, finishing in fourth place. She returned in 2019 and was paired with Brian McFadden, again, finishing in fourth place, following a fall in the semi-final skate-off. She was originally planned to partner with Michael Barrymore in series 12, but on 18 December 2019, it was announced that Barrymore had withdrawn from the show after breaking his hand in training, however from Week 4 onwards she replaced Alexandra Schauman as Joe Swash's partner after Schauman sustained an injury. Swash and Murphy went on to win the series. On 24 June 2020, it was announced that Murphy would not return for the 2021 series. In December 2023, Murphy revealed she had married her partner Kleiny, aka Paul Klein.

=== Tom Naylor ===
Tom Naylor is a British figure skater and doctor. Prior to Dancing on Ice, he was in Holiday on Ice and Hot Ice Show. For series 12 he was partnered with Coronation Street actress, Lisa George.

=== Darya Nucci ===
Darya Nucci has no senior national medals to her name and did not compete in any ISU Championships. She appeared in series 4 with Jeremy Edwards.

=== Pam O'Connor ===
Pamela O'Connor is a Scottish ice dancer. With Jonathon O'Dougherty, she won the 2003 British Championships and finished 19th at the 2003 World Championships. She appeared in series 1 with David Seaman and series 2 with Neil Fox.

=== Tippy Packard ===
Tippy Packard is an ice skater from Hong Kong. She toured over 40 countries as a show skater after retiring from the competitive sport. She was announced as a professional skater in series 14. She was paired up with Kye Whyte. For series 15, she was paired with Darren Harriott.

=== Fred Palascak ===
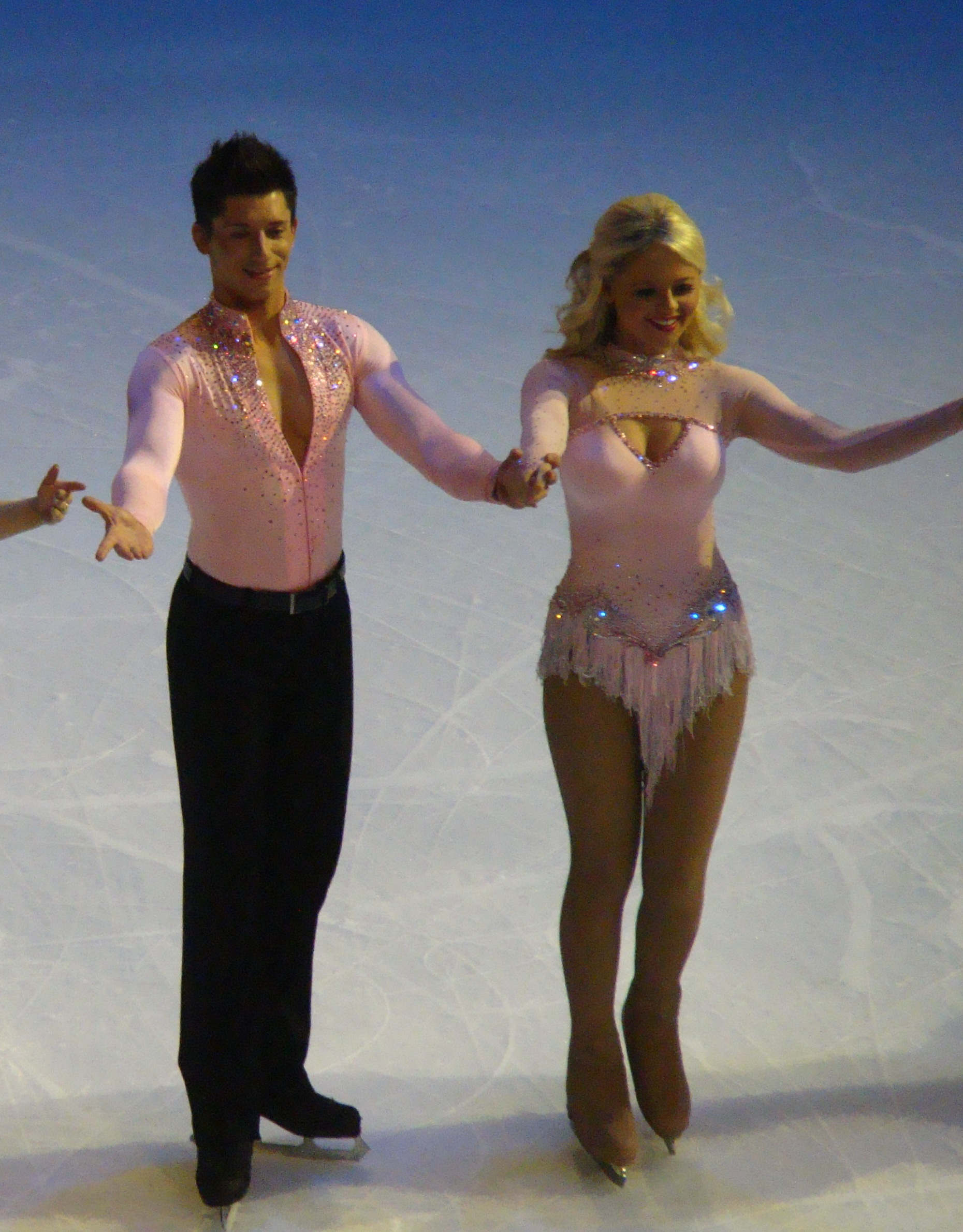
Palascak with Emily Atack on the Dancing on Ice tour in 2010

Fred Palascak (born 2 April 1975 in Parma, Ohio) is an American pair skater. He and Melanie Lambert began skating together in 1994 and married in 2003. They placed 9th on the senior level at the 1996 U.S. national championships. They did not compete in any ISU Championship or Grand Prix events. He appeared in series 2 with Kay Burley. They were eliminated at fifth show. In series 3, he and Sarah Greene were the first partnership voted off, however, Palascak returned to the show in the third week of the competition, partnering actress Zaraah Abrahams, a reserve brought in to fill the space left by Michael Underwood's injury-related departure. Abrahams and Palascak finished in third place. In series 4, he was partnered with Melinda Messenger and was voted off in week 7. Palascak and his series 5 partner, The Inbetweeners actress Emily Atack, were eliminated in week 8. In 2010, Palascak appeared on the U.S. show Skating with the Stars as the partner of the winner, Rebecca Budig.

=== Natalia Pestova ===
Natalia Pestova has no senior national medals to her name and did not compete in any ISU Championships. She appeared in series 2 with Phil Gayle

=== Oscar Peter ===
Oscar Peter (born 11 June 1981) is a Swiss figure skater. He was brought in as a replacement partner for Caprice in Week 4 of series 12 after she parted ways with her original partner, Hamish Gaman.

=== Frankie Poultney ===
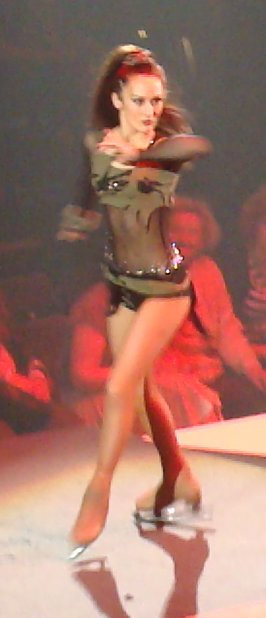
Frankie Poultney in 2009

Frankie Poultney (born 1 March 1973; from 2015 named Frankie Seaman) is a British skater. She has no senior national medals to her name and did not compete in any ISU Championship or Grand Prix events. She performed worldwide for over twenty years as a professional adagio skater. In series 2, she skated with English footballer Lee Sharpe, who was eliminated in week 7. In series 3, Poultney was paired with Hollyoaks and Coronation Street actor Chris Fountain. They finished as runners-up to Suzanne Shaw and Matt Evers. In series 4, she was partnered with British rugby player Ellery Hanley; they were eliminated in week 5. In series 5, her partner was former Coronation Street actor Danny Young, who was eliminated in 5th position against Kieron Richardson and Brianne Delcourt in the week 10 skate-off.

In series 6, Poultney and her partner, BBC Radio 1 presenter Comedy Dave, were eliminated in week 4. In series 7, she was paired with English singer and television presenter Mark Rhodes; they were third to be eliminated. Poultney also competed on the Dancing On Ice, Olympic special spin-off "Dancing On Ice Goes Gold" partnering Olympic silver medalist hurdler Colin Jackson. It was announced in December 2013 that she was engaged to series 1 contestant David Seaman. They were subsequently partnered together in series 9, where they were eliminated in week 2. They married in 2015. David and Frankie Seaman performed together on the second season of The Masked Dancer as "Pillar and Post," finishing in eighth place after Frankie had to withdraw due to injury.

=== Simon Proulx-Sénécal ===
Simon Proulx-Sénécal (born 6 December 1991) is a Canadian-born ice dancer who competes for Armenia. He is a Golden Spin of Zagreb bronze medalist and reached the free dance at two European Championships in 2016 and 2017. He joined the show in series 16 and was paired with Amber Davies. They were the eighth couple to be eliminated in the semi-final.

=== Colin Ratushniak ===
Colin Ratushniak (born 18 August 1985 in Gillam, Manitoba) is a Canadian skater. He switched from hockey to figure skating at the age of 12. He is the 2002 Manitoba novice champion in men's singles. He has no senior national medals to his name and did not appear in any ISU Championship or Grand Prix events. In 2003, after graduating from high school, Ratushniak joined Feld Entertainment to skate in Disney on Ice productions and continued to tour for eight years, working with Rand Productions and Karen Kresge Productions. During this time he also developed his skills as a pairs skater, pairing up with Amanda Frank and Isabelle Gauthier. He appeared in series 6 with Laura Hamilton. They finished as runners-up in the series to Sam Attwater and Brianne Delcourt and went on to perform in cities across the UK with the Dancing on Ice Live Tour.

=== Sean Rice ===
Sean Rice (July 20, 1972 – January 14, 2022) was a Canadian pair skater. With his wife Jodeyne Higgins, he is a two-time Canadian senior bronze medalist and placed as high as 10th at the World Championships in 1993. They also won four national titles in four skating. He was paired with Angela Rippon in series 6 and Chemmy Alcott in series 7. Rice died of unknown causes on 14 January 2022, becoming the first Dancing on Ice professional to pass away.

=== Łukasz Różycki ===
Łukasz Różycki is a Polish pair skater. With Aneta Kowalska, he competed twice at the World Junior Championships (placing as high as 16th) and won a bronze medal at an ISU Junior Grand Prix event. He is married to Finnish skater Alexandra Schauman. He appeared in series 6 with Elen Rivas and series 7 with Laila Morse. In season 9, he was paired with Beth Tweddle. He returned to the show in its 11th series and was partnered with Didi Conn. In series 12, he was partnered with talk show host, Trisha Goddard. They were first to be eliminated. In series 13, he was partnered with musician and presenter, Myleene Klass. They were also first to be eliminated. In series 14, Różycki was paired with Ria Hebden and they were eliminated second. In series 15, he was paired with Michelle Heaton. Różycki and his wife Schauman did not return for series 16, as they left take part in the skating theatre show Christmas on Ice in Tampa, Florida.

=== Todd Sand ===
Todd Sand is an American pair skater. With wife Jenni Meno, he is the 1998 World silver medalist, 1995–96 World bronze medalist, three-time U.S. national champion (1994–96), and competed at two Olympics, placing as high as 5th (1994). He appeared in series 1 with Kelly Holmes.

=== Alexandra Schauman ===
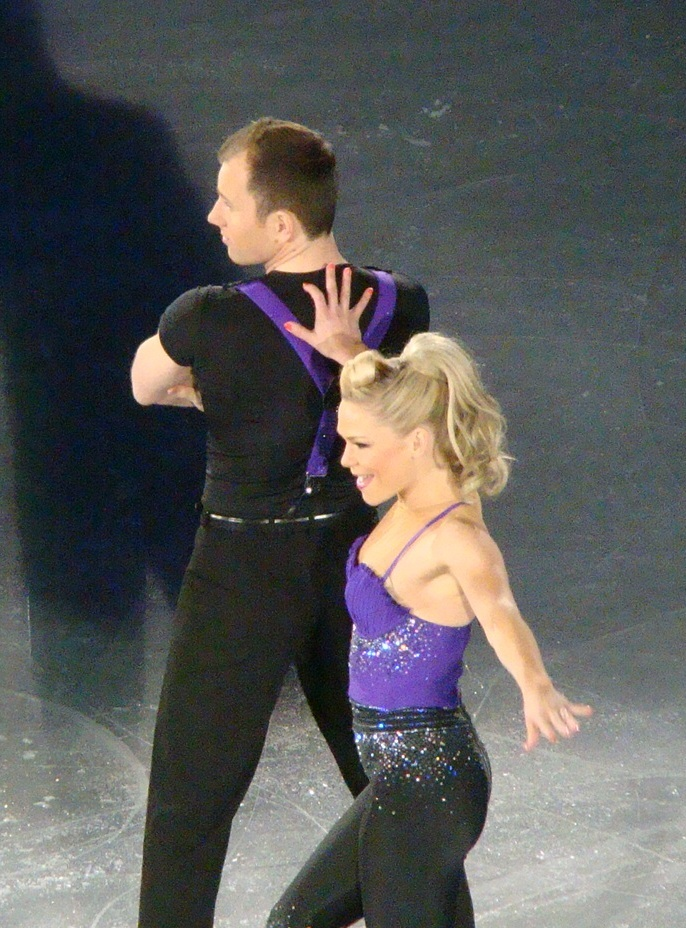
Schauman and Łukasz Różycki on the Dancing on Ice tour in 2011.

Alexandra Schauman (born 17 June 1980) is a Finnish skater who finished 7th in the junior ladies' singles event at the 1996 Finnish Championships. She did not appear in any ISU Championship or Grand Prix events. She is married to Łukasz Różycki.

From October and December 2008, Schauman appeared on the Swedish equivalent of Dancing on Ice, Stjärnor på is. She was runner-up with her partner footballer Jesper Blomqvist. In January 2010, she appeared in series 5 of the British show. She and her partner, Hilary Jones, were eliminated in week 6. In series 6, she was partnered with cricketer Dominic Cork. They survived the skate-off on 23 January but were eliminated the following week. She and Sam Nixon, a children's television presenter, finished seventh in series 7. She was paired with Todd Carty for series 9. She returned to the show in its 11th series and was partnered with professional dancer James Jordan. The pair went on to win the series. For series 12, she was partnered with actor and television presenter, Joe Swash. However, after sustaining an injury, Swash was re-partnered with Alex Murphy. Swash and Murphy went on to win the series. In series 13, she was paired with actor and singer, Jason Donovan but withdrew on 22 February due to Jasons back injury. In series 14, Schauman was paired with singer Connor Ball and they reached the semi-final. In series 15, she was paired with John Fashanu. Schauman and her husband Różycki did not return for series 16, as they left take part in the skating theatre show Christmas on Ice in Tampa, Florida.

=== Tamara Sharp ===
Tamara Sharp did not appear in any ISU Championship or Grand Prix events. She was paired with Andi Peters in series 1.

=== Olga Sharutenko ===
Olga Sharutenko is a Russian ice dancer. With Dmitri Naumkin, she is the 1997 World Junior champion and competed for four seasons on the senior international level, twice winning the Nebelhorn Trophy. Sharutenko appeared in series 1 with John Barrowman and appeared again in series 8, paired with Keith Chegwin.

=== Matej Silecky ===
Matej Silecky is an American skater who competed in senior singles and pairs at the national level. He is the 2012 - 2013 U.S. Collegiate Figure Skating Champion, Junior Men, achieved while attending the University of California, Berkeley. He has no senior national medals to his name and did not compete in any ISU Championships. Matej was partnered with Coronation Street actress Brooke Vincent, in his first series, finishing as runners-up to Jake Quickenden and Vanessa Bauer.

=== Olivia Smart ===
Olivia Smart (born 1 April 1997) is a British-Spanish ice dancer. She was the 2021 Skate Canada an international bronze medalist, a four-time Challenger Series medalist, and a three-time Spanish national champion. She joined the show in series 15 and won alongside Nile Wilson. Smart returned to competitive skating and did not return for series 16.

=== Jenna Smith ===
Jenna Smith (Harrison) did not appear in any ISU Championship or Grand Prix events. She was paired with Luke Campbell in series 8.

=== Katie Stainsby ===
Katie Stainsby is a British skater who originally appeared on the Dutch version of Dancing on Ice partnering comedian John Jones, after their elimination from the show Stainsby took on the role as series choreographer. She performed and choreographed many pro routines as well as the celebrity couple skates. She and her professional partner Stuart Widdall opened a special edition of the show which was performed for Princess Beatrice of Holland. Stainsby also appeared in another version of the show in Holland called Sterren Dansen, partnering world strong man Jarno Hams. Stainsby was paired with Vanilla Ice in series 6 and Gary Lucy in series 9. She also partnered Olympic gold medalist rower Steve Williams in Dancing on Ice Goes Gold, they finished in first place. Stainsby has also appeared in the world renowned Hot Ice show for over 8 years and currently coaches and skates with her partner Swiss and international competitor and champion Oscar Peter in the UK.

=== Nina Ulanova ===
Nina Ulanova is a Russian ice dancer. With Michail Stifunin, she is the 1997 World Junior champion and won several senior international medals (non-Grand Prix). She appeared in series 6 with Steven Arnold and series 7 with Matthew Wolfenden (winner). In series 9, she was partnered with Kyran Bracken.

=== Doug Webster ===
Doug Webster has no senior national medals to his name and did not compete in any ISU Championships. He appeared in series 1 with Andrea McLean.

=== Daniel Whiston ===
Daniel Whiston is an English skater. He has no senior national medals to his name and did not compete in any ISU Championship or Grand Prix events. He appeared in series 1 with Gaynor Faye (winner), series 2 with Emily Symons, series 3 with Linda Lusardi, series 4 with Roxanne Pallett, series 5 with Hayley Tamaddon (winner), series 6 with Kerry Katona, and series 7 with Jennifer Ellison. He was paired with Beth Tweddle (winner) in series 8 and became three-time champion of Dancing on Ice on 10 March 2013. Whiston was paired again with Tamaddon for series 9 and they came runner-up. He returned to the show in its 10th series in 2018 and was partnered with Cheryl Baker. In 2019, he was promoted to Associate Creative Director.

=== Stuart Widdall ===
Stuart Widdall did not appear in any ISU Championship or Grand Prix events. He performed in series 4 with Coleen Nolan and series 5 with Tana Ramsey. Widdall quit the show in 2010 to become a gay porn star under the name of Trey Thornton.

=== Michael Zenezini ===
Michael Zenezini is a French ice dancer. With Melanie Espejo, he competed twice at the World Junior Championships, placing fifth in 1998. He appeared in series 6 with Chloe Madeley and in series 8 with Lauren Goodger.

== See also ==
- List of figure skaters
