= Dancing on Ice series 11 =

Eleventh series of Dancing on Ice

Dancing on Ice
- Series 11
- Presented by: Phillip Schofield; Holly Willoughby
- Judges: Ashley Banjo; Christopher Dean; Jason Gardiner; Jayne Torvill
- Celebrity winner: James Jordan
- Professional winner: Alexandra Schauman
- No. of episodes: 10

Release
- Original network: ITV
- Original release: 6 January – 10 March 2019

Series chronology
- ← Previous; Series 10 Next → Series 12

The eleventh series of Dancing on Ice debuted on 6 January 2019 on ITV. Filming took place in the purpose-built studio at Bovingdon Airfield. An announcement was made on 11 March 2018, during the series ten finale, that the show had been recommissioned for another series.

Phillip Schofield and Holly Willoughby once again returned as hosts; Ashley Banjo, Christopher Dean, Jason Gardiner, and Jayne Torvill all returned as judges. Former judge Karen Barber returned as head coach, a role that she had last held in 2012. Professional skater Daniel Whiston, who has partnered with a celebrity skater in every series since 2006, did not take part in the competition in 2019, but instead took on the role of Associate Creative Director. Jordan Banjo, who was a host in the backstage rink in 2018, was not able to return to the show due to scheduling conflicts; series ten contestant Kem Cetinay joined the show in the role of digital host. Sam Matterface returned as a commentator for series eleven. Daniel Whiston returned as the show's Creative Director.

James Jordan and Alexandra Schauman were announced as the winners on 10 March 2019.

== Couples ==
On 1 October 2018, Gemma Collins and Richard Blackwood were announced as the first two celebrities for series eleven. More celebrities were revealed in the following days, with the full line-up announced on 5 October.

On 29 October, it was revealed that eight of the professional skaters from series ten would return: reigning champion Vanessa Bauer, Brianne Delcourt, Matt Evers, Hamish Gaman, Mark Hanretty, Sylvain Longchambon, Brandee Malto, and Alex Murphy. Two of the professional skaters who last took part in series nine in 2014, Alexandra Schauman and Łukasz Różycki, were to rejoin the show alongside new professionals Carlotta Edwards and Alexander Demetriou.

Celebrity	Notability	Professional partner	Status
Mark Little	Neighbours actor	Brianne Delcourt	Eliminated 1st on 13 January 2019
Richard Blackwood	EastEnders actor	Carlotta Edwards	Eliminated 2nd on 20 January 2019
Didi Conn	Grease actress	Łukasz Różycki	Eliminated 3rd on 27 January 2019
Saira Khan	Television presenter	Mark Hanretty	Eliminated 4th on 3 February 2019
Gemma Collins	The Only Way Is Essex star	Matt Evers	Eliminated 5th on 10 February 2019
Ryan Sidebottom	England cricketer	Brandee Malto	Eliminated 6th on 17 February 2019
Jane Danson	Coronation Street actress	Sylvain Longchambon	Eliminated 7th on 17 February 2019
Melody Thornton	The Pussycat Dolls singer	Alexander Demetriou	Eliminated 8th on 24 February 2019
Brian McFadden	Westlife singer	Alex Murphy	Eliminated 9th on 3 March 2019
Saara Aalto	Singer-songwriter	Hamish Gaman	Third place on 10 March 2019
Wes Nelson	Love Island finalist	Vanessa Bauer	Runners-up on 10 March 2019
James Jordan	Strictly Come Dancing professional	Alexandra Schauman	Winners on 10 March 2019

== Scoring chart ==
The highest score each week is indicated in bold green with a dagger (†), while the lowest score each week is indicated in italicized red with a double-dagger (‡).

Color key:

Winners
Runners-up
Third place
Bottom two or three
Eliminated

Dancing on Ice (series 11) - Weekly scores
Couple	Pl.	Week									
Couple	Pl.	1	2	3	4	5	6	7	8	9	10
James & Alexandra	1st	**30.5**†	—N/a	27.0	31.5	**36.5**†	**34.0**†	36.0	35.5+5=40.5	40.0+40.0=**80.0**†	39.0+40.0=79.0‡ (Note: This couple finished in first place.)
Wes & Vanessa	2nd	—N/a	**25.0**†	**29.5**†	29.5	34.0	33.5	**38.0**†	38.5+4=**42.5**†	37.5+36.0=73.5	40.0+40.0=**80.0**† (Note: This couple finished in second place.)
Saara & Hamish	3rd	20.5	—N/a	26.0	27.0 (Note: This couple was in the bottom two or three, but was not eliminated.)	33.5	31.0	30.0	32.0+1=33.0‡	35.0+38.0=73.0	40.0+40.0=**80.0**† (Note: This couple finished in third place.)
Brian & Alex	4th	—N/a	20.0	22.0	24.0	25.5	24.5	28.5	33.0+2=35.0	33.5+36.5=70.0‡ (Note: This couple was eliminated.)	
Melody & Alexander	5th	—N/a	24.0	20.5	**32.5**†	31.0	33.0	31.0	35.5+3=38.5		
Jane & Sylvain	6th	20.5	—N/a	20.0	21.5	23.5	22.5	25.5			
Ryan & Brandee	7th	—N/a	15.0‡	19.0	—N/a	22.5	22.0	24.0‡			
Gemma & Matt	8th	16.0	—N/a	13.0‡	16.5‡	13.5‡	15.5‡				
Saira & Mark	9th	—N/a	19.5	18.5	24.0	22.0					
Didi & Łukasz	10th	14.5	—N/a	16.5	18.5						
Richard & Carlotta	11th	—N/a	17.5	18.0							
Mark & Brianne	12th	13.5‡									

== Weekly scores ==
=== Week 1 (6 January) ===
Group performances:

- "Come Alive" — from The Greatest Showman
- "Proud Mary" — Tina Turner (Brian & Alex, Melody & Alexander, Richard & Carlotta, Ryan & Brandee, Saira & Mark, and Wes & Vanessa)

Only half of the celebrities performed this week. The couple with the lowest votes from the first week competed against the couple with the lowest votes from second week in the skate-off. Couples are listed in the order they performed.

Couple	Judges' scores				Total score	Music	Public vote	Points			Result
Couple	Gardiner	Banjo	Torvill	Dean	Total score	Music	Public vote	Judges	Public	Total	Result
Jane & Sylvain	3.0	5.5	6.0	6.0	20.5	"On the Street Where You Live" — Dean Martin	23.94%	5	4	9	Safe
Didi & Łukasz	2.5	4.0	4.0	4.0	14.5	"We Go Together" — from Grease	11.70%	3	3	6	Safe
Saara & Hamish	4.5	5.5	5.0	5.5	20.5	"Born This Way" — Lady Gaga	7.40%	5	2	7	Safe
James & Alexandra	8.0	7.5	7.5	7.5	30.5	"I Won't Dance" — Jane Monheit & Michael Bublé	24.19%	6	5	11	Safe
Mark & Brianne	3.0	3.5	3.5	3.5	13.5	"Down Under" — Men at Work	4.50%	2	1	3	Eliminated
Gemma & Matt	2.5	4.5	4.5	4.5	16.0	"Crazy in Love" — Beyoncé, feat. Jay-Z	28.23%	4	6	10	Safe

=== Week 2 (13 January) ===
Group performances:

- "Electricity" — Silk City & Dua Lipa (performed by professional skaters)
- "Runaway Baby" — Bruno Mars (Didi & Łukasz, Gemma & Matt, James & Alexandra, Jane & Sylvain, Mark & Brianne, and Saara & Hamish)

Couples are listed in the order they performed.

Couple	Judges' scores				Total score	Music	Public vote	Points			Result
Couple	Gardiner	Banjo	Torvill	Dean	Total score	Music	Public vote	Judges	Public	Total	Result
Brian & Alex	3.5	5.5	5.5	5.5	20.0	"Mandy" — Westlife	21.16%	4	5	9	Safe
Ryan & Brandee	3.0	4.5	3.5	4.0	15.0	"Crazy Crazy Nights" — Kiss	6.11%	1	1	2	Bottom two
Melody & Alexander	4.5	6.0	6.5	7.0	24.0	"Rise Up" — Andra Day	16.84%	5	4	9	Safe
Richard & Carlotta	3.0	4.5	5.0	5.0	17.5	"Sir Duke" — Stevie Wonder	14.76%	2	3	5	Safe
Saira & Mark	4.0	5.0	5.0	5.5	19.5	"Express Yourself" — Madonna	10.32%	3	2	5	Safe
Wes & Vanessa	4.0	7.0	7.0	7.0	25.0	"Gravity" — DJ Fresh, feat. Ella Eyre	30.78%	6	6	12	Safe

Save Me skates

- Mark & Brianne: "Don't Leave Me This Way" — Harold Melvin & the Blue Notes
- Ryan & Brandee: "Shake It Off" — Taylor Swift

Judges' votes to save

- Gardiner: Ryan & Brandee
- Banjo: Ryan & Brandee
- Torvill: Ryan & Brandee
- Dean: Did not need to vote, but would have voted for Ryan & Brandee

=== Week 3 (20 January) ===
Theme: Musicals Group performance: "There's No Business Like Show Business" — from Annie Get Your Gun

Couples are listed in the order they performed.

Couple	Judges' scores				Total score	Music	Musical	Public vote	Points			Result
Couple	Gardiner	Banjo	Torvill	Dean	Total score	Music	Musical	Public vote	Judges	Public	Total	Result
Didi & Łukasz	3.5	4.5	4.5	4.0	16.5	"A Spoonful of Sugar"	Mary Poppins	5.90%	2	4	6	Safe
Jane & Sylvain	4.0	5.0	5.5	5.5	20.0	"I Dreamed a Dream"	Les Misérables	14.69%	6	10	16	Safe
Richard & Carlotta	4.0	4.5	4.5	5.0	18.0	"Beggin'"	Jersey Boys	4.82%	3	3	6	Eliminated
Saara & Hamish	6.0	6.5	6.5	7.0	26.0	"Let It Go"	Frozen	10.86%	9	7	16	Safe
Brian & Alex	4.5	5.5	6.0	6.0	22.0	"Fat Sam's Grand Slam"	Bugsy Malone	9.14%	8	6	14	Safe
James & Alexandra	6.5	6.5	7.0	7.0	27.0	"The Phantom of the Opera"	The Phantom of the Opera	12.75%	10	9	19	Safe
Saira & Mark	4.5	4.5	4.5	5.0	18.5	"I'd Do Anything"	Oliver!	2.70%	4	1	5	Bottom two
Ryan & Brandee	4.0	5.0	5.0	5.0	19.0	"Beauty and the Beast"	Beauty and the Beast	6.39%	5	5	10	Safe
Wes & Vanessa	7.0	7.5	7.5	7.5	29.5	"You Can't Stop the Beat"	Hairspray	15.70%	11	11	22	Safe
Gemma & Matt	3.0	3.5	3.5	3.0	13.0	"Diamonds Are a Girl's Best Friend"	Gentlemen Prefer Blondes	12.56%	1	8	9	Safe
Melody & Alexander	3.5	5.0	6.0	6.0	20.5	"America"	West Side Story	4.43%	7	2	9	Safe

Save Me skates

- Richard & Carlotta: "The Tracks of My Tears" — The Miracles
- Saira & Mark: "Roar" — Katy Perry

Judges' votes to save

- Gardiner: Richard & Carlotta
- Banjo: Richard & Carlotta
- Dean: Saira & Mark
- Torvill: Saira & Mark (Since the other judges were not unanimous, Torvill, as head judge, made the final decision to save Saira & Mark)

=== Week 4 (27 January) ===
Torvill & Dean performance: "Dangerous Love" — Fuse ODG

Due to an injury, Ryan & Brandee did not compete on the live show.

Couples are listed in the order they performed.

Couple	Judges' scores				Total score	Music	Public vote	Points			Result
Couple	Gardiner	Banjo	Torvill	Dean	Total score	Music	Public vote	Judges	Public	Total	Result
James & Alexandra	7.5	8.0	8.0	8.0	31.5	"Hook Me Up" — The Veronicas	16.98%	8	9	17	Safe
Saara & Hamish	6.5	6.0	7.0	7.5	27.0	"Symphony" — Clean Bandit, feat. Zara Larsson	6.01%	6	2	8	Bottom two
Didi & Łukasz	4.5	4.5	5.0	4.5	18.5	"Eye of the Tiger" — London Music Works	5.42%	3	1	4	Eliminated
Gemma & Matt	4.0	4.5	4.0	4.0	16.5	"It's All Coming Back to Me Now" — Celine Dion	13.84%	2	7	9	Safe
Melody & Alexander	7.5	8.0	8.5	8.5	32.5	"Sax" — Fleur East	11.94%	9	5	14	Safe
Wes & Vanessa	7.5	8.0	7.0	7.0	29.5	"Sign of the Times" — Harry Styles	13.01%	7	6	13	Safe
Brian & Alex	5.5	6.0	6.5	6.0	24.0	"With or Without You" — U2	9.89%	5	4	9	Safe
Saira & Mark	6.0	5.5	6.5	6.0	24.0	"Total Eclipse of the Heart" — Bonnie Tyler	6.21%	5	3	8	Safe
Jane & Sylvain	4.5	5.5	5.5	6.0	21.5	"Dancing" — Kylie Minogue	16.66%	4	8	12	Safe

Save Me skates

- Saara & Hamish: "Fight Song" — Rachel Platten
- Didi & Łukasz: "My Girl" — The Temptations

Judges' votes to save

- Gardiner: Saara & Hamish
- Banjo: Saara & Hamish
- Torvill: Saara & Hamish
- Dean: Did not need to vote, but would have voted for Saara & Hamish

=== Week 5 (3 February) ===
Theme: Fairy Tales
Guest performance: Disney on Ice

Couples are listed in the order they performed.

Couple	Judges' scores				Total score	Music	Public vote	Points			Result
Couple	Gardiner	Banjo	Torvill	Dean	Total score	Music	Public vote	Judges	Public	Total	Result
Melody & Alexander	7.5	7.5	8.0	8.0	31.0	"Breathing Underwater" — Emeli Sandé	6.39%	6	3	9	Safe
Brian & Alex	5.5	6.5	7.0	6.5	25.5	"I Want Candy" — Bow Wow Wow	8.51%	5	4	9	Safe
Saira & Mark	5.0	5.5	6.0	5.5	22.0	"The Perfect Year" — Dina Carroll	3.25%	2	1	3	Eliminated
Wes & Vanessa	8.5	8.5	8.5	8.5	34.0	"Rewrite the Stars" — James Arthur & Anne-Marie	16.89%	8	8	16	Safe
Gemma & Matt	4.0	3.5	3.0	3.0	13.5	"Look What You Made Me Do" — Taylor Swift	9.47%	1	5	6	Safe
Jane & Sylvain	5.5	6.0	6.0	6.0	23.5	"A Kind of Magic" — Queen	16.45%	4	7	11	Safe
Saara & Hamish	9.0	8.0	8.0	8.5	33.5	"Puppet on a String" — Sandie Shaw	12.26%	7	6	13	Safe
Ryan & Brandee	5.0	5.5	6.0	6.0	22.5	"Giant" — Calvin Harris & Rag'n'Bone Man	3.81%	3	2	5	Bottom two
James & Alexandra	9.5	9.0	9.0	9.0	36.5	"Sleeping Beauty Waltz" — Pyotr Ilyich Tchaikovsky	22.93%	9	9	18	Safe

Save Me skates

- Saira & Mark: "Express Yourself" — Madonna
- Ryan & Brandee: "Shake It Off" — Taylor Swift

Judges' votes to save

- Gardiner: Ryan & Brandee
- Banjo: Ryan & Brandee
- Dean: Ryan & Brandee
- Torvill: Did not need to vote, but would have voted for Ryan & Brandee

=== Week 6 (10 February) ===
Group performances:

- "Holding Out for a Hero" — Bonnie Tyler (performed by professional skaters)
- "Heart Upon My Sleeve" — Avicii (Nick Buckland and Penny Coomes)

Couples are listed in the order they performed.

Couple	Judges' scores				Total score	Music	Public vote	Points			Result
Couple	Gardiner	Banjo	Torvill	Dean	Total score	Music	Public vote	Judges	Public	Total	Result
James & Alexandra	8.5	8.5	8.5	8.5	34.0	"Dancing on My Own" — Calum Scott	20.68%	8	8	16	Safe
Ryan & Brandee	5.5	5.5	5.5	5.5	22.0	"Baggy Trousers" — Madness	5.25%	2	1	3	Bottom two
Jane & Sylvain	6.0	5.5	5.5	5.5	22.5	"Love on the Brain" — Rihanna	15.85%	3	6	9	Safe
Melody & Alexander	8.5	8.5	8.0	8.0	33.0	"Somethin' Stupid" — Frank & Nancy Sinatra	7.71%	6	2	8	Safe
Brian & Alex	5.5	6.0	6.5	6.5	24.5	"Believer" — Imagine Dragons	10.78%	4	4	8	Safe
Gemma & Matt	4.0	4.0	4.0	3.5	15.5	"Survivor" — Destiny's Child	9.80%	1	3	4	Eliminated
Wes & Vanessa	8.0	8.5	8.5	8.5	33.5	"Despacito (Remix)" — Luis Fonsi & Daddy Yankee, feat. Justin Bieber	16.51%	7	7	14	Safe
Saara & Hamish	8.0	7.5	7.5	8.0	31.0	"Dancing in the Dark" — Trevor Horn, feat. Gabrielle Aplin & The Sarm Orchestra	13.38%	5	5	10	Safe

Save Me skates

- Gemma & Matt: "Queen of the Night" — Whitney Houston
- Ryan & Brandee: "High Hopes" — Kodaline

Judges' votes to save

- Gardiner: Ryan & Brandee
- Banjo: Ryan & Brandee
- Torvill: Ryan & Brandee
- Dean: Did not need to vote, but would have voted for Ryan & Brandee

=== Week 7 (17 February) ===
Guest performance: "Rule the World" — Take That (Marigold IceUnity)

Couples are listed in the order they performed.

Couple	Judges' scores				Total score	Music	Public vote	Points			Result
Couple	Gardiner	Banjo	Torvill	Dean	Total score	Music	Public vote	Judges	Public	Total	Result
Saara & Hamish	7.5	7.5	7.0	8.0	30.0	"Trouble" — Pink	10.81%	4	3	7	Safe
Wes & Vanessa	9.5	9.5	9.5	9.5	38.0	"Jealous" — Labrinth	21.82%	7	6	13	Safe
Ryan & Brandee	6.5	6.0	6.0	5.5	24.0	"Hold My Girl" — George Ezra	4.04%	1	1	2	Eliminated
Melody & Alexander	7.5	7.5	8.0	8.0	31.0	"That's My Girl" — Fifth Harmony	6.48%	5	2	7	Bottom three
Jane & Sylvain	6.5	6.0	6.5	6.5	25.5	"Hallelujah I Love Her So" — Ray Charles	15.64%	2	4	6	Eliminated
James & Alexandra	9.0	9.0	9.0	9.0	36.0	"Seven Nation Army" — The White Stripes	24.21%	6	7	13	Safe
Brian & Alex	6.5	7.0	7.5	7.5	28.5	"You Never Can Tell" — Chuck Berry	16.97%	3	5	8	Safe

Save Me skates

- Ryan & Brandee: "Baggy Trousers" — Madness
- Melody & Alexander: "Fighter" — Christina Aguilera
- Jane & Sylvain: "Hold On" — Wilson Phillips

Judges' votes to save

- Gardiner: Melody & Alexander
- Banjo: Melody & Alexander
- Dean: Melody & Alexander
- Torvill: Did not need to vote, but would have voted for Melody & Alexander

=== Week 8 (24 February) ===
Theme: Time Tunnel
Group performances:

- "Bad Romance" — Lady Gaga (performed by professional skaters)
- "Pompeii" — Bastille (Skate Battle)
- "#thatPOWER" — will.i.am, feat. Justin Bieber (performed by professional skaters)

Couples are listed in the order they performed.

Couple	Judges' scores				Total score	Solo Skate Battle	Music	Public vote	Points			Result
Couple	Gardiner	Banjo	Torvill	Dean	Total score	Solo Skate Battle	Music	Public vote	Judges	Public	Total	Result
James & Alexandra	8.0	9.0	9.5	9.0	35.5	5 pts.	"Meet the Flintstones" — from The Flintstones	28.73%	4	5	9	Safe
Melody & Alexander	9.0	8.0	9.0	9.5	35.5	3 pts.	"Walk Like an Egyptian" — The Bangles	8.76%	3	1	4	Eliminated
Saara & Hamish	8.0	8.0	8.0	8.0	32.0	1 pt.	"Killer Queen" — Queen	9.22%	1	2	3	Bottom two
Brian & Alex	8.0	8.0	8.5	8.5	33.0	2 its.	"Suspicious Minds" — Elvis Presley	25.28%	2	3	5	Safe
Wes & Vanessa	9.0	9.5	10.0	10.0	38.5	4 pts.	"Treasure" — Bruno Mars	27.99%	5	4	9	Safe

Save Me skates

- Melody & Alexander: "Rise Up" — Andra Day
- Saara & Hamish: "Who You Are" — Jessie J

Judges' votes to save

- Gardiner: Saara & Hamish
- Banjo: Saara & Hamish
- Torvill: Saara & Hamish
- Dean: Did not need to vote, but would have voted for Saara & Hamish

=== Week 9: Semifinals (3 March) ===
Special musical guest: Olly Murs — "Excuses"

Couples are listed in the order they performed.

Couple	Order	Judges' scores				Total score	Music	Public vote	Points			Result
Couple	Order	Gardiner	Banjo	Torvill	Dean	Total score	Music	Public vote	Judges	Public	Total	Result
Saara & Hamish	1	9.0	8.5	8.5	9.0	73.0	"Hot n Cold" — Katy Perry	12.14%	2	1	3	Bottom two
Saara & Hamish	5	9.5	9.5	9.5	9.5	73.0	"Defying Gravity" — from Wicked	12.14%	2	1	3	Bottom two
Wes & Vanessa	2	9.0	9.5	9.5	9.5	73.5	"Breathe" — Jax Jones, feat. Ina Wroldsen	25.47%	3	3	6	Safe
Wes & Vanessa	6	9.0	9.0	9.0	9.0	73.5	"Never Too Much" — Luther Vandross	25.47%	3	3	6	Safe
Brian & Alex	3	8.0	8.0	9.0	8.5	70.0	"Fix You" — Coldplay	23.37%	1	2	3	Eliminated
Brian & Alex	7	9.5	9.0	9.0	9.0	70.0	"Then I Kissed Her" — Beach Boys	23.37%	1	2	3	Eliminated
James & Alexandra	4	10.0	10.0	10.0	10.0	80.0	"Hold Back the River" — James Bay	39.01%	4	4	8	Safe
James & Alexandra	8	10.0	10.0	10.0	10.0	80.0	"Do You Love Me" — The Contours	39.01%	4	4	8	Safe

Save Me skates

- Saara & Hamish: "Who You Are" — Jessie J
- Brian & Alex: "Don't Let the Sun Go Down on Me" — Elton John

Judges' votes to save

- Gardiner: Saara & Hamish
- Banjo: Saara & Hamish
- Dean: Saara & Hamish
- Torvill: Did not need to vote, but would have voted for Saara & Hamish

=== Week 10: Finale (10 March) ===
Torvill & Dean performance: "Bridge over Troubled Water" — Josh Groban

Each couple performed two routines. Couples are listed in the order they performed.

Couple	Order	Judges' scores				Total score	Music	Public vote	Pts.	Boléro	Pts.	Result
Couple	Order	Gardiner	Banjo	Torvill	Dean	Total score	Music	Public vote	Pts.	Boléro	Pts.	Result
Wes & Vanessa	1	10.0	10.0	10.0	10.0	80.0	"Pump It" — The Black Eyed Peas	38.24%	2	45.04%	1	Runners-up
Wes & Vanessa	4	10.0	10.0	10.0	10.0	80.0	"Rewrite the Stars" — James Arthur & Anne-Marie	38.24%	2	45.04%	1	Runners-up
James & Alexandra	2	9.5	9.5	10.0	10.0	79.0	"La cumparsita" — Gerardo Matos Rodríguez	51.25%	3	54.95%	2	Winners
James & Alexandra	5	10.0	10.0	10.0	10.0	79.0	"Do You Love Me" — The Contours	51.25%	3	54.95%	2	Winners
Saara & Hamish	3	10.0	10.0	10.0	10.0	80.0	"Circus" — Britney Spears	10.49%	1	—N/a		Third place
Saara & Hamish	6	10.0	10.0	10.0	10.0	80.0	"Puppet on a String" — Sandie Shaw	10.49%	1	—N/a		Third place

== Ratings ==
Official ratings are taken from BARB. Viewing figures are from 7 day data.

Episode	Date	Total viewers (millions)
Live show 1	6 January	7.51
Live show 2	13 January	N/A
Live show 3	20 January	6.27
Live show 4	27 January	6.91
Live show 5	3 February	6.42
Live show 6	10 February	6.19
Live show 7	17 February	5.61
Live show 8	24 February	5.26
Live semifinal	3 March	5.74
Live finale	10 March	6.37
