= Kevin Kilbane =

English-born Irish footballer

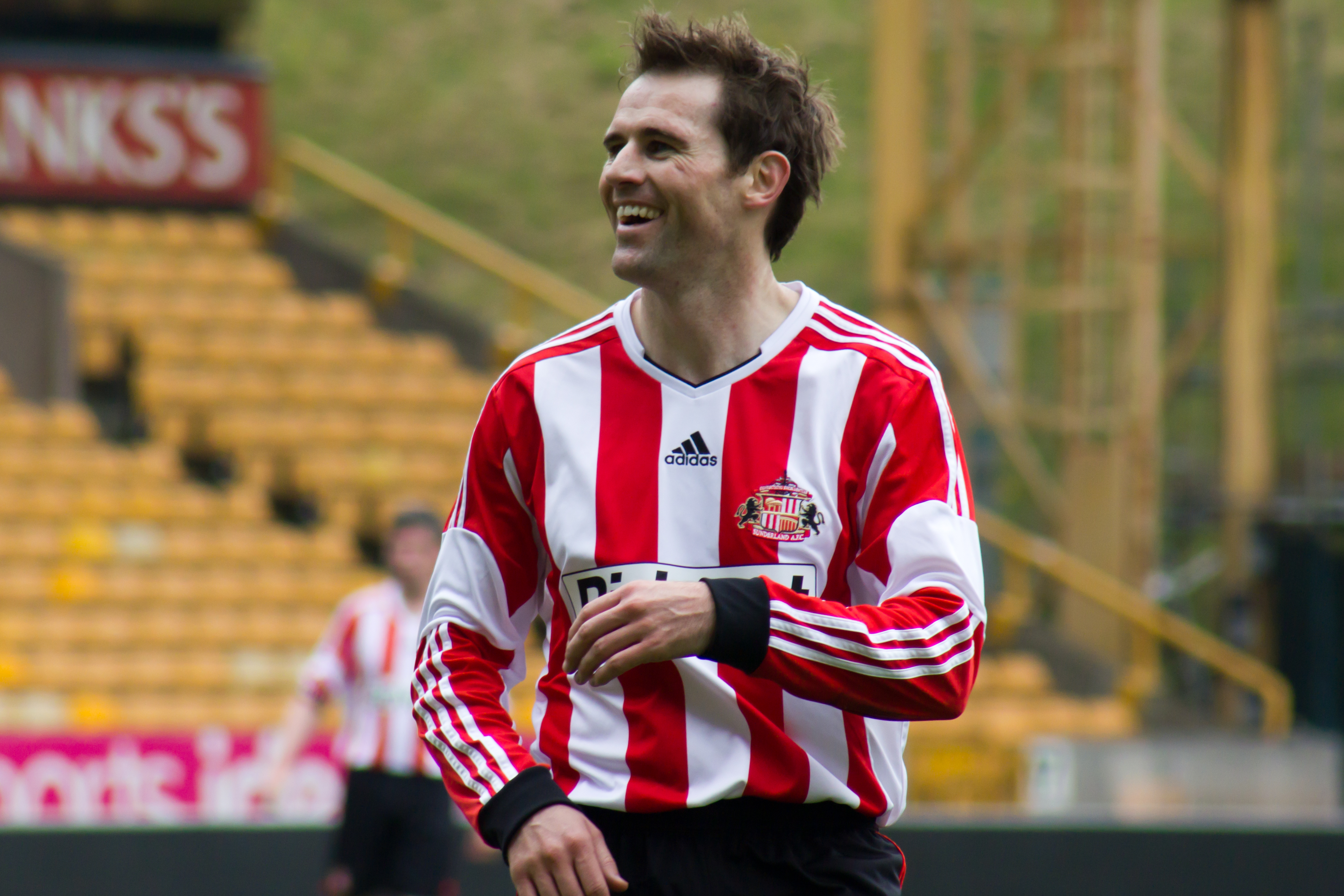
- Kilbane playing in Jody Craddock's testimonial match, 2014

Personal information
- Full name: Kevin Daniel Kilbane
- Date of birth: 1 February 1977 (age 49)
- Place of birth: Preston, England
- Height: 6 ft 0 in (1.83 m)
- Positions: Left-back; left winger

Youth career
- Preston North End

Senior career*
Years	Team	Apps	(Gls)
1995–1997	Preston North End	48	(3)
1997–1999	West Bromwich Albion	106	(15)
1999–2003	Sunderland	113	(8)
2003–2006	Everton	104	(4)
2006–2009	Wigan Athletic	76	(2)
2009–2012	Hull City	51	(2)
2011	→ Huddersfield Town (loan)	24	(2)
2011	→ Derby County (loan)	9	(1)
2012	Coventry City	9	(1)
Total		540	(37)

International career
1996–1997	Republic of Ireland U21	11	(1)
1997–2011	Republic of Ireland	110	(8)
- * Club domestic league appearances and goals

Kevin Daniel Kilbane (born 1 February 1977) is a former professional footballer who played as a left-back or left winger.

Kilbane played for several English clubs, including Everton, West Bromwich Albion, Sunderland, Wigan Athletic, Huddersfield Town and Derby County (the last two on loan from Hull City) and Coventry City.

Born in England, Kilbane won 110 caps for the Republic of Ireland national team, placing him fourth behind only Robbie Keane, Shay Given and John O'Shea on the list of the most capped Irish players.

Towards the end of his career, Kilbane concentrated on forging a media career. He now works as an analyst for Virgin Media Television (Ireland), BBC Radio 5 Live, BBC Match of the Day, Football Focus, Final Score, Ireland's Newstalk Radio Off The Ball football show and most recently for Canada's The Sports Network (TSN) and their coverage of the 2022 and 2026 FIFA World Cups.

== Club career ==
=== Early career ===
Born in Preston, Lancashire, Kilbane made his professional debut at his hometown club, Preston North End, after making his way through the youth system at Deepdale. It was not long before his performances began to attract attention from other clubs, and he was sold to West Bromwich Albion for a fee of £1 million in 1997. Kilbane was Albion's first £1 million player, breaking a club transfer record which had stood since 1979.

=== Sunderland ===
In December 1999, Peter Reid's Sunderland paid £2.5 million for the left winger, making him the third most expensive club signing at the time. His impact was immediate; coming off the bench on his debut against Southampton, Kilbane crossed for Kevin Phillips to score the match winner. However, this was to be Sunderland's last win until March 2000, a loss in form which came to be known as "The Curse of Kilbane".

In spite of his best efforts on the pitch, he soon became a target for the Black Cats fans to vent their frustrations, as the team's drop in form under Peter Reid continued and the team were relegated from the Premiership. In the summer of 2002, he gave the travelling Sunderland fans a two-fingered salute on a pre-season tour of France. His days at the Stadium of Light seemed numbered.

=== Everton ===
On the last day of the transfer window at the start of the 2003–04 season, Kilbane moved to Everton for just under £1 million, where he was reunited with David Moyes. The Goodison Park fans would appreciate his commitment and re-invigorate Kilbane as a player. In return, he displayed great versatility which resulted in him being deployed right across the midfield, at left-back or even as a support striker, as well has his preferred left-wing position. On 26 August 2006, during his last game for Everton against Tottenham Hotspur, he was sent off by referee Mark Halsey for two bookable offences.

=== Wigan Athletic ===
On 31 August 2006, Kilbane signed a three-year deal with Wigan Athletic for an estimated fee of £2 million. On 15 April 2007, he scored his first goal for Wigan Athletic with a powerful header in the 3–3 draw against Tottenham Hotspur. This was his first goal at club level since October 2004. He then scored his second goal for Wigan with a looping header over Robert Green's head from Ryan Taylor's cross as Wigan went on to beat West Ham 1–0. Kilbane played most of his second season in the unfamiliar left-back role, but still managed to win Wiganer.net's Player of The Season Award.

=== Hull City ===
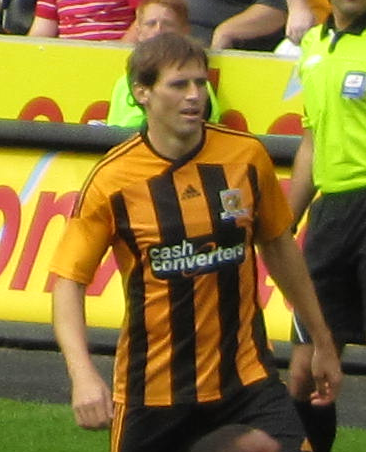
Kilbane playing for Hull City in 2011

With limited first team opportunities at Wigan due to the emergence of Maynor Figueroa and with his contract set to expire in the summer, Kilbane transferred to Hull City on 15 January 2009 for an undisclosed fee believed to be in the region of £500,000, signing a two-and-a-half-year deal with the Yorkshire club. He scored his first goal for the club against Burnley on 10 April 2010.

==== Loan to Huddersfield Town ====
On 1 January 2011, as the transfer window reopened, Kilbane joined Football League One side Huddersfield Town on loan until the end of the season, mainly as a replacement for the injured Damien Johnson. He made his debut the same day in the 2–2 draw against Carlisle United at Brunton Park. He scored his first goal for the club in the 4–2 win over Walsall at the Bescot Stadium on 15 January. After signing for Huddersfield, he helped the team to a club record 26 league games unbeaten, before their eventual 3–0 defeat in the playoff final to Peterborough.

==== Loan to Derby County ====
On 2 August 2011, Kilbane joined Derby County on a six-month loan deal from Hull. Kilbane played 10 times for Derby, scoring one goal in a 3–0 win against Doncaster Rovers on 20 August. However, Kilbane's loan was cut short on 29 November, due to a back injury.

=== Coventry City ===
On 2 July 2012, Kilbane joined Coventry City on an initial one-year deal. On his debut against Dagenham & Redbridge in the League Cup on 14 August, he scored a late winner from the penalty spot. On 16 August, Kilbane was named captain for the 2012–13 season. He made his final professional appearance as a substitute in a 2–1 defeat at Brentford on 24 October, before announcing his immediate retirement on 8 December.

== International career ==
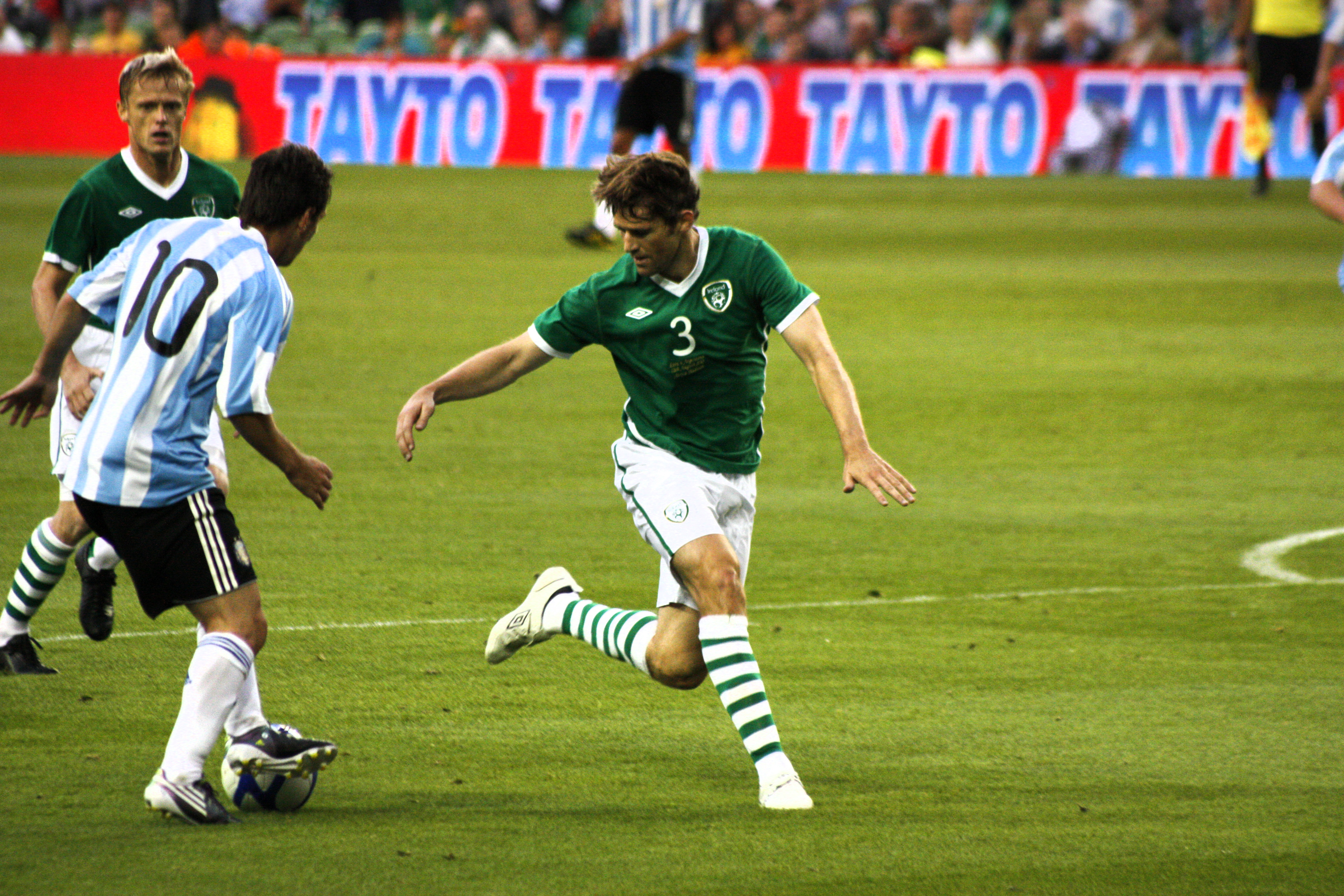
Kilbane defending against Argentina's Lionel Messi, 2010

While still a youth player at Preston, Kilbane was called up to the England u-18 squad, but declined as he had always wished to represent Ireland. Kilbane is an Irish citizen since birth, as both his parents are Irish, and he made his international debut against Iceland on 6 September 1997. He was chosen as part of Mick McCarthy's squad for the 2002 FIFA World Cup in Japan and South Korea. The team did relatively well at the tournament, progressing to the knockout stage. They lost to Spain in a penalty shootout when Iker Casillas saved Kilbane and David Connolly's penalties.

Kilbane scored his first international goal in nearly four years with a magnificent strike against the Czech Republic on 11 October 2006. He scored his 8th international goal on 7 September 2010 against Andorra, the first competitive goal for the Republic of Ireland at the new Aviva Stadium.

Kilbane won his 100th cap against Montenegro on 14 November 2009, and on 2 March 2010, he and Shay Given became the joint most-capped players for the Republic of Ireland, both earning their 103rd caps in a 2-0 friendly defeat to Brazil. As of 4 June 2011, Kilbane played his 66th consecutive competitive international game (a run stretching back to 1999); only England's Billy Wright has achieved a longer unbroken run in competitive international football. Kilbane was only four games away from equalling Wright's record of 70 consecutive competitive international starts. However, this run ended after he was not selected for Ireland's crunch UEFA Euro 2012 qualification tie against Slovakia due to a back operation. He never played for Ireland again, and announced his retirement as a footballer in December 2012.

== Media career ==
Kilbane obtained a degree in Professional Sports Writing and Broadcasting at Staffordshire University. Kilbane was enlisted by RTÉ Sport for their squad of pundits ahead of the 2010 FIFA World Cup in South Africa. From 2012, he became a studio analyst for UEFA Champions League and UEFA Europa League coverage on TV3 and 3e in Ireland, and also a regular on Setanta Sports. On 7 April 2013, he made his first appearance as a studio pundit on the BBC One's Match of the Day 2. On 9 May 2013, he made his first appearance on the Guardian Football Weekly Extra podcast.

In 2014, Kilbane was part of the commentary team for the BBC at the 2014 FIFA World Cup in Brazil.

From August 2016, Kilbane began a role as co-presenter on the Off the Ball show on Newstalk radio in Ireland. Kilbane also provided commentary for the station's Premier League coverage.

In 2020, Kilbane competed in the twelfth series of Dancing on Ice, alongside partner Brianne Delcourt; the couple were eliminated in Week 5. After relocating to Canada with Delcourt, Kilbane took up a role as professional analyst on The Sports Network (TSN) during the COVID-delayed UEFA Euro 2020.

== Personal life ==
Kilbane has been a fan of the Mayo Gaelic footballers since boyhood, became a member of a fanclub upon his retirement from professional association football in 2012, and attended many of the team's matches when he lived in Ireland.

He is a patron of the Down's Syndrome Association, and in February 2015, sent a complaint to the FA over allegations that West Ham United supporters had sung a chant mocking the condition.

Kilbane entered into a relationship with professional figure skater Brianne Delcourt, his skating partner on the twelfth series of Dancing on Ice. They got engaged in February 2020, and were married in September 2020 in Haliburton, Ontario. The couple have two daughters together, while Kilbane is stepfather to Delcourt's daughter from a previous relationship. He had been married to his first wife Laura Harrison until 2011, with whom he also has two daughters.

== Career statistics ==
=== Club ===
Appearances and goals by club, season and competition
Club	Season	League			FA Cup		League Cup		FL Trophy		Play-offs		Europe		Total	
Club	Season	Division	Apps	Goals	Apps	Goals	Apps	Goals	Apps	Goals	Apps	Goals	Apps	Goals	Apps	Goals
Preston North End	1994–95	Third Division				0	0	0		0			0	0		
Preston North End	1995–96	Third Division				0	0	0		0			0	0		
Preston North End	1996–97	Second Division	36	2	0	0	4	0	0	0	0	0	0	0	40	2
Preston North End	Total		48	3	1	0	4	0	2	0	0	0	0	0	55	3
West Bromwich Albion	1997–98	First Division	43	4	2	1	3	0	0	0	0	0	0	0	48	5
West Bromwich Albion	1998–99	First Division	44	6	1	0	2	0	0	0	0	0	0	0	47	6
West Bromwich Albion	1999–2000	First Division	19	5	1	0	5	2	0	0	0	0	0	0	25	7
West Bromwich Albion	Total		106	15	4	1	10	2	0	0	0	0	0	0	120	18
Sunderland	1999–2000	Premier League	20	1	0	0	0	0	0	0	0	0	0	0	20	1
Sunderland	2000–01	Premier League	30	4	3	1	1	0	0	0	0	0	0	0	34	5
Sunderland	2001–02	Premier League	28	2	1	0	1	0	0	0	0	0	0	0	30	2
Sunderland	2002–03	Premier League	30	1	3	0	1	0	0	0	0	0	0	0	34	1
Sunderland	2003–04	First Division	5	0	0	0	1	0	0	0	0	0	0	0	6	0
Sunderland	Total		113	8	7	1	4	0	0	0	0	0	0	0	124	9
Everton	2003–04	Premier League	30	3	3	1	0	0	0	0	0	0	0	0	33	4
Everton	2004–05	Premier League	38	1	3	0	2	0	0	0	0	0	0	0	43	1
Everton	2005–06	Premier League	34	0	4	0	1	0	0	0	0	0	4	0	43	0
Everton	2006–07	Premier League	2	0	0	0	0	0	0	0	0	0	0	0	2	0
Everton	Total		104	4	10	1	3	0	0	0	0	0	4	0	121	5
Wigan Athletic	2006–07	Premier League	31	1	1	0	1	0	0	0	0	0	0	0	33	1
Wigan Athletic	2007–08	Premier League	35	1	2	0	1	0	0	0	0	0	0	0	38	1
Wigan Athletic	2008–09	Premier League	10	0	1	0	2	0	0	0	0	0	0	0	13	0
Wigan Athletic	Total		76	2	4	0	4	0	0	0	0	0	0	0	84	2
Hull City	2008–09	Premier League	16	0	0	0	0	0	0	0	0	0	0	0	16	0
Hull City	2009–10	Premier League	21	1	1	0	2	0	0	0	0	0	0	0	24	1
Hull City	2010–11	Championship	14	1	0	0	1	0	0	0	0	0	0	0	15	1
Hull City	2011–12	Championship	0	0	0	0	0	0	0	0	0	0	0	0	0	0
Hull City	Total		51	2	1	0	3	0	0	0	0	0	0	0	55	2
Huddersfield Town (loan)	2010–11	League One	24	2	2	0	0	0	2	0	3	1	0	0	31	3
Derby County (loan)	2011–12	Championship	9	1	0	0	1	0	0	0	0	0	0	0	10	1
Coventry City	2012–13	League One	9	0	0	0	2	2	1	0	0	0	0	0	12	2
Total			540	37	29	3	31	4	5	0	3	1	4	0	612	45

=== International ===
Appearances and goals by national team and year
National team	Year	Apps	Goals
Republic of Ireland	1997	1	0
Republic of Ireland	1998	2	0
Republic of Ireland	1999	7	0
Republic of Ireland	2000	10	1
Republic of Ireland	2001	10	2
Republic of Ireland	2002	10	0
Republic of Ireland	2003	11	1
Republic of Ireland	2004	8	0
Republic of Ireland	2005	9	1
Republic of Ireland	2006	7	1
Republic of Ireland	2007	11	1
Republic of Ireland	2008	6	0
Republic of Ireland	2009	10	0
Republic of Ireland	2010	6	1
Republic of Ireland	2011	2	0
Total		110	8

== Honours ==
Preston North End

- Football League Third Division: 1995–96

Individual

- FAI Senior International Player of the Year: 2004

== See also ==
- List of Republic of Ireland international footballers born outside the Republic of Ireland
- List of men's footballers with 100 or more international caps
