= Dancing on Ice series 10 =

Tenth series of Dancing on Ice

Dancing on Ice
- Series 10
- Presented by: Phillip Schofield; Holly Willoughby
- Judges: Ashley Banjo; Christopher Dean; Jason Gardiner; Jayne Torvill
- Celebrity winner: Jake Quickenden
- Professional winner: Vanessa Bauer
- No. of episodes: 10

Release
- Original network: ITV
- Original release: 7 January – 11 March 2018

Series chronology
- ← Previous; Series 9 Next → Series 11

The tenth series of Dancing on Ice debuted on ITV on 7 January 2018. It was the first series since the show had ended in 2014 and featured a new set and ice rink, a new panel of judges, and a new logo. After the tenth series, the live tour of Dancing on Ice returned from March to April 2018, featuring celebrities from the series.

For this series, the show relocated from its previous home at Elstree Studios to a new, purpose-built studio at RAF Bovingdon in Hertfordshire. Creative directors and mentors Christopher Dean and Jayne Torvill became head judges and alternated the role on a weekly basis, joined on the panel by newcomer Ashley Banjo and Jason Gardiner, who returned for his ninth series as judge.

Phillip Schofield and Holly Willoughby served as hosts, with Willoughby replacing Christine Lampard. Ashley's brother Jordan Banjo acted as the show's backstage digital host.

On 21 November 2017, it was confirmed that professional skater Mark Hanretty would return to the 2018 show, replacing Lloyd Jones. Matt Chapman was named as commentator for the series in December 2017. However, he left after the first episode and was replaced by Sam Matterface. The production team had asked him to take part in the Friday rehearsals, however these clashed with his commitments with Sky Sports.

The competition was won by Jake Quickenden and Vanessa Bauer on 11 March 2018.

== Couples ==
Coronation Street actress Brooke Vincent was the first celebrity announced for the lineup. More celebrities were announced in early November, concluding with Stephanie Waring on 8 November. On 20 November, it was reported that new professional skaters Megan Marschall and Lloyd Jones had left from the series for "personal reasons". They were replaced by new skater Alex Murphy and returning skater Mark Hanretty. On 5 December, it was confirmed that Monty Panesar had withdrawn from the show after sustaining an injury during training. Lemar was announced as his replacement.

Celebrity	Notability	Professional partner	Status
Candice Brown	The Great British Bake Off winner	Matt Evers	Eliminated 1st on 14 January 2018
Stephanie Waring	Hollyoaks actress	Sylvain Longchambon	Eliminated 2nd on 21 January 2018
Perri Shakes-Drayton	Olympic hurdler	Hamish Gaman	Eliminated 3rd on 28 January 2018
Cheryl Baker	Bucks Fizz singer & television presenter	Daniel Whiston	Eliminated 4th on 4 February 2018
Lemar	Singer-songwriter & producer	Melody Le Moal	Eliminated 5th on 11 February 2018
Antony Cotton	Coronation Street actor	Brandee Malto	Eliminated 6th & 7th on 18 February 2018
Donna Air	Actress & television presenter	Mark Hanretty	Eliminated 6th & 7th on 18 February 2018
Alex Beresford	ITV Weather forecaster	Brianne Delcourt	Eliminated 8th on 25 February 2018
Kem Cetinay	Love Island winner	Alex Murphy	Eliminated 9th on 4 March 2018
Max Evans	Rugby union player	Ale Izquierdo; Brandee Malto (Week 8)	Third place on 11 March 2018
Brooke Vincent	Coronation Street actress	Matej Silecky	Runners-up on 11 March 2018
Jake Quickenden	Singer & The X Factor contestant	Vanessa Bauer	Winners on 11 March 2018

== Scoring chart ==
The highest score each week is indicated in bold green with a dagger (†), while the lowest score each week is indicated in italicized red with a double-dagger (‡).

Color key:

Winners
Runners-up
Third place
Bottom two or three
Eliminated

Dancing on Ice (series 10) - Weekly scores
Couple	Pl.	Week									
Couple	Pl.	1	2	3	4	5	6	7	8	9	10 (Note: The judges did not award any scores.)
Jake & Vanessa	1st	**20.5**†	—N/a	**27.5**†	**27.5**†	**33.5**†	**33.5**†	**36.0**†	**38.0**†	36.5+40.0=**76.5**†	**Winners**
Brooke & Matej	2nd	—N/a	13.0	16.5	17.5	19.0‡	21.0	29.5	30.0	33.0+34.5=67.5‡	Runners-up
Max & Ale	3rd	—N/a	**21.5**†	19.0	22.5	26.0	29.0	32.0 (Note: This couple was in the bottom two or three, but was not eliminated.)	32.5	37.5+36.0=73.5	Third place
Kem & Alex	4th	**20.5**†	—N/a	23.5	**27.5**†	29.5	29.0	30.0	33.5	35.0+38.0=73.0 (Note: This couple was eliminated.)	
Alex & Brianne	5th	—N/a	19.5	20.5	22.5	21.5	29.5	30.0	28.0‡		
Donna & Mark	6th	—N/a	17.5	23.5	23.5	25.5	25.5	26.0			
Antony & Brandee	6th	15.5	—N/a	15.5	20.0	19.0‡	21.0	18.0‡			
Lemar & Melody	8th	—N/a	15.0	16.5	19.0	20.5	20.0‡				
Cheryl & Dan	9th	—N/a	11.5‡	14.0‡	16.0‡	19.0‡					
Perri & Hamish	10th	20.0	—N/a	20.5	19.5						
Stephanie & Sylvain	11th	14.5	—N/a	17.5							
Candice & Matt	12th	13.0‡									

== Weekly scores ==
=== Week 1 (7 January) ===
Group performances:

- "Changing" — Sigma, feat. Paloma Faith
- "I'm Still Standing" — Elton John (Alex & Brianne, Brooke & Matej, Cheryl & Daniel, Donna & Mark, Lemar & Melody, and Max & Ale)
- "Power" — Little Mix (performed by professional skaters)

Only half of the celebrities performed this week. The couple with the lowest votes from the first week competed against the couple with the lowest votes from second week in the skate-off. Couples are listed in the order they performed.

Couple	Judges' scores				Total score	Music	Result
Couple	Gardiner	Banjo	Torvill	Dean	Total score	Music	Result
Antony & Brandee	3.0	4.0	4.5	4.0	15.5	"Club Tropicana" — Wham!	Safe
Candice & Matt	3.0	3.5	3.5	3.0	13.0	"At Last" — Etta James	Eliminated
Jake & Vanessa	4.0	5.0	6.0	5.5	20.5	"Wrapped Up" — Olly Murs	Safe
Perri & Hamish	5.5	4.5	5.0	5.0	20.0	"Runnin' (Lose It All)" — Naughty Boy, feat. Beyoncé & Arrow Benjamin	Safe
Stephanie & Sylvain	3.0	3.5	4.5	3.5	14.5	"Blow Your Mind (Mwah)" — Dua Lipa	Safe
Kem & Alex	4.5	5.0	5.5	5.5	20.5	"Shut Up and Dance" — Walk the Moon	Safe

=== Week 2 (14 January) ===
Group performances:

- "Wonder" — Naughty Boy, feat. Emeli Sandé
- "I Wanna Dance with Somebody" — Whitney Houston (Antony & Brandee, Candice & Matt, Jake & Vanessa, Kem & Alex, Perri & Hamish, and Stephanie & Sylvain)

Couples are listed in the order they performed.

Couple	Judges' scores				Total score	Music	Result
Couple	Gardiner	Banjo	Torvill	Dean	Total score	Music	Result
Brooke & Matej	3.0	3.0	3.5	3.5	13.0	"I Really Like You" — Carly Rae Jepsen	Safe
Max & Ale	4.5	5.5	6.0	5.5	21.5	"Perfect" — Ed Sheeran	Safe
Lemar & Melody	3.5	3.5	4.0	4.0	15.0	"Soul Man" — Sam & Dave	Bottom two
Donna & Mark	4.5	4.0	4.5	4.5	17.5	"I've Got You Under My Skin" — Michael Bublé	Safe
Alex & Brianne	4.5	5.0	5.0	5.0	19.5	"Sun Comes Up" — Rudimental, feat. James Arthur	Safe
Cheryl & Dan	2.5	3.0	3.0	3.0	11.5	"Making Your Mind Up" — Bucks Fizz	Safe

Save Me skates

- Candice & Matt: "A Thousand Miles" — Vanessa Carlton
- Lemar & Melody: "Grenade" — Bruno Mars

Judges' votes to save

- Gardiner: Candice & Matt
- Banjo: Candice & Matt
- Torvill: Lemar & Melody
- Dean: Lemar & Melody (Since the other judges were not unanimous, Dean, as head judge, made the final decision to save Lemar & Melody)

=== Week 3 (21 January) ===
Theme: Disco
Group performance: "Last Dance" — Donna Summer

Couples are listed in the order they performed.

Couple	Judges' scores				Total score	Music	Result
Couple	Gardiner	Banjo	Torvill	Dean	Total score	Music	Result
Kem & Alex	4.5	6.0	6.5	6.5	23.5	"I'm So Excited" — The Pointer Sisters	Safe
Stephanie & Sylvain	4.0	4.5	4.5	4.5	17.5	"After the Love Has Gone" — Earth, Wind & Fire	Eliminated
Antony & Brandee	3.5	4.0	4.0	4.0	15.5	"Spinning Around" — Kylie Minogue	Safe
Max & Ale	4.0	4.5	5.5	5.0	19.0	"Relight My Fire" — Dan Hartman	Safe
Perri & Hamish	6.0	5.5	4.5	4.5	20.5	"Wishing on a Star" — Rose Royce	Safe
Alex & Brianne	4.5	5.0	5.5	5.5	20.5	"You Make Me Feel (Mighty Real)" — Sylvester	Safe
Donna & Mark	5.5	6.0	6.0	6.0	23.5	"I'm Every Woman" — Chaka Khan	Safe
Lemar & Melody	4.0	4.0	4.5	4.0	16.5	"Easy" — Commodores	Bottom two
Jake & Vanessa	6.5	7.0	7.0	7.0	27.5	"Canned Heat" — Jamiroquai	Safe
Cheryl & Dan	3.5	3.5	3.5	3.5	14.0	"Dancing Queen" — ABBA	Safe
Brooke & Matej	4.0	4.5	4.0	4.0	16.5	"Get Lucky" — Daft Punk, feat. Pharrell Williams	Safe

Save Me skates

- Stephanie & Sylvain: "Glow" — Ella Henderson
- Lemar & Melody: "Grenade" — Bruno Mars

Judges' votes to save

- Gardiner: Stephanie & Sylvain
- Banjo: Stephanie & Sylvain
- Dean: Lemar & Melody
- Torvill: Lemar & Melody (Since the other judges were not unanimous, Torvill, as head judge, made the final decision to save Lemar & Melody)

=== Week 4 (28 January) ===
Group performance: "Set Fire to the Rain" — Adele (performed by professional skaters)

Couples are listed in the order they performed.

Couple	Judges' scores				Total score	Music	Result
Couple	Gardiner	Banjo	Torvill	Dean	Total score	Music	Result
Jake & Vanessa	6.5	6.5	7.0	7.5	27.5	"Are You Gonna Be My Girl" — Jet	Safe
Donna & Mark	6.0	6.0	6.0	5.5	23.5	"Bleeding Love" — Leona Lewis	Safe
Perri & Hamish	4.5	5.0	5.0	5.0	19.5	"Hold My Hand" — Jess Glynne	Eliminated
Antony & Brandee	4.5	5.0	5.5	5.0	20.0	"Songbird" — Fleetwood Mac	Safe
Max & Ale	5.0	5.5	6.0	6.0	22.5	"Dancing on the Ceiling" — Lionel Richie	Safe
Lemar & Melody	4.5	4.5	5.0	5.0	19.0	"Viva la Vida" — Coldplay	Bottom two
Cheryl & Dan	4.0	4.0	4.0	4.0	16.0	"Respect" — Aretha Franklin	Safe
Alex & Brianne	5.0	5.5	6.0	6.0	22.5	"My Girl" — The Temptations	Safe
Brooke & Matej	4.0	4.5	4.5	4.5	17.5	"Instruction" — Jax Jones, feat. Demi Lovato	Safe
Kem & Alex	5.5	7.0	7.5	7.5	27.5	"Stay with Me" — Sam Smith	Safe

Save Me skates

- Perri & Hamish: "Stronger (What Doesn't Kill You)" — Kelly Clarkson
- Lemar & Melody: "Grenade" — Bruno Mars

Judges' votes to save

- Gardiner: Lemar & Melody
- Banjo: Lemar & Melody
- Torvill: Lemar & Melody
- Dean: Did not vote, but would have voted to save Lemar & Melody

=== Week 5 (4 February) ===
Group performances:

- "Dancing in the Street" — David Bowie & Mick Jagger
- "Rumba d'Amour" (Penny Coomes & Nick Buckland)

Couples are listed in the order they performed.

Couple	Judges' scores				Total score	Music	Result
Couple	Gardiner	Banjo	Torvill	Dean	Total score	Music	Result
Max & Ale	6.5	6.5	6.5	6.5	26.0	"Pencil Full of Lead" — Paolo Nutini	Safe
Jake & Vanessa	8.5	8.0	8.5	8.5	33.5	"Let It Go" — James Bay	Safe
Donna & Mark	6.5	6.5	6.5	6.0	25.5	"Let's Get Loud" — Jennifer Lopez	Bottom two
Lemar & Melody	5.0	5.0	5.5	5.0	20.5	"Shape of You" — Ed Sheeran	Safe
Cheryl & Dan	4.5	4.5	5.0	5.0	19.0	"She's Always a Woman" — Billy Joel	Eliminated
Antony & Brandee	4.0	5.0	5.0	5.0	19.0	"I Am What I Am" — Gloria Gaynor	Safe
Kem & Alex	6.5	7.0	8.0	8.0	29.5	"24K Magic" — Bruno Mars	Safe
Alex & Brianne	5.5	5.0	5.5	5.5	21.5	"Luck Be a Lady" — Frank Sinatra	Safe
Brooke & Matej	4.0	5.0	5.0	5.0	19.0	"Lush Life" — Zara Larsson	Safe

Save Me skates

- Donna & Mark: "Time After Time" — Cyndi Lauper
- Cheryl & Dan: "Don't Go Breaking My Heart" — Elton John & Kiki Dee

Judges' votes to save

- Gardiner: Donna & Mark
- Banjo: Donna & Mark
- Dean: Donna & Mark
- Torvill: Did not vote, but would have voted to save Donna & Mark

=== Week 6 (11 February) ===
Theme: Love
Group performances:

- "Came Here for Love" — Sigala & Ella Eyre
- "Single Ladies (Put a Ring on It)" — Beyoncé (performed by professional skaters)

Couples are listed in the order they performed.

Couple	Judges' scores				Total score	Music	Result
Couple	Gardiner	Banjo	Torvill	Dean	Total score	Music	Result
Kem & Alex	7.0	7.0	7.5	7.5	29.0	"What Makes You Beautiful" — One Direction	Safe
Lemar & Melody	5.0	5.0	5.5	4.5	20.0	"Someone like You" — Adele	Eliminated
Max & Ale	7.5	7.5	7.0	7.0	29.0	"I Believe in a Thing Called Love" — The Darkness	Safe
Antony & Brandee	5.0	5.5	5.0	5.5	21.0	"Bridge over Troubled Water" — Simon & Garfunkel	Safe
Jake & Vanessa	8.5	8.0	8.5	8.5	33.5	"Can't Take My Eyes Off You" — Andy Williams	Safe
Donna & Mark	6.0	6.5	6.5	6.5	25.5	"Love Shack" — The B-52's	Bottom two
Brooke & Matej	4.5	5.5	5.5	5.5	21.0	"You've Got the Love" — Florence and the Machine	Safe
Alex & Brianne	7.0	7.5	7.5	7.5	29.5	"All of Me" — John Legend	Safe

Save Me skates

- Lemar & Melody: "Viva la Vida" — Coldplay
- Donna & Mark: "Time After Time" — Cyndi Lauper

Judges' votes to save

- Gardiner: Donna & Mark
- Banjo: Donna & Mark
- Torvill: Donna & Mark
- Dean: Did not vote, but would have voted to save Donna & Mark

=== Week 7 (18 February) ===
Special musical guest: Camila Cabello — "Never Be the Same"

Couples are listed in the order they performed.

Couple	Judges' scores				Total score	Music	Result
Couple	Gardiner	Banjo	Torvill	Dean	Total score	Music	Result
Brooke & Matej	7.5	7.5	7.0	7.5	29.5	"Sing Sing Sing" — Bebo Best & The Super Lounge Orchestra	Safe
Alex & Brianne	7.5	7.5	7.5	7.5	30.0	"Perfect Strangers" — Jonas Blue, feat. JP Cooper	Safe
Max & Ale	8.0	8.0	8.0	8.0	32.0	"Always" — Bon Jovi	Bottom three
Antony & Brandee	4.5	4.5	4.5	4.5	18.0	"From New York to L.A." — Patsy Gallant	Eliminated
Kem & Alex	7.5	7.5	7.5	7.5	30.0	"Sorry" — Justin Bieber	Safe
Donna & Mark	6.5	6.5	6.5	6.5	26.0	"Frozen" — Madonna	Eliminated
Jake & Vanessa	9.0	9.0	9.0	9.0	36.0	"Let Me Entertain You" — Robbie Williams	Safe

Save Me skates

- Max & Ale: "I Won't Give Up" — Jason Mraz
- Antony & Brandee: "How Long Will I Love You?" — Ellie Goulding
- Donna & Mark: "Time After Time" — Cyndi Lauper

Judges' votes to save

- Gardiner: Max & Ale
- Banjo: Max & Ale
- Dean: Max & Ale
- Torvill: Did not vote, but would have voted to save Max & Ale

=== Week 8 (25 February) ===
Theme: Fairy Tales
Guest performance: Disney on Ice
Group performances:

- "A Sky Full of Stars" — Coldplay (performed by professional skaters)
- "Could It Be Magic" — Take That
- "Too Good at Goodbyes" — Sam Smith (performed by professional skaters)

Due to Ale Izquierdo having the flu, Max Evans performed with Brandee Malto this week.

Couples are listed in the order they performed.

Couple	Judges' scores				Total score	Music	Result
Couple	Gardiner	Banjo	Torvill	Dean	Total score	Music	Result
Max & Brandee	8.0	8.0	8.0	8.5	32.5	"Hungry Like the Wolf" — Duran Duran	Safe
Brooke & Matej	8.0	7.5	7.0	7.5	30.0	"Black Magic" — Little Mix	Safe
Alex & Brianne	6.0	7.0	7.5	7.5	28.0	"King" — Years & Years	Eliminated
Jake & Vanessa	9.5	9.5	9.5	9.5	38.0	"Toxic" — Britney Spears	Safe
Kem & Alex	8.5	8.5	8.5	8.0	33.5	"I Put a Spell on You" — Nina Simone	Bottom two

Save Me skates

- Alex & Brianne: "Don't Dream It's Over" — Crowded House
- Kem & Alex: "There's Nothing Holdin' Me Back" — Shawn Mendes

Judges' votes to save

- Gardiner: Kem & Alex
- Banjo: Kem & Alex
- Torvill: Kem & Alex
- Dean: Did not vote, but would have voted to save Kem & Alex

=== Week 9: Semifinals (4 March) ===
Guest performance: "Shape of You" & "Thinking Out Loud" — Ed Sheeran (Gabriella Papadakis & Guillaume Cizeron)

Couples are listed in the order they performed.

Couple	Order	Judges' scores				Total score	Music	Result
Couple	Order	Gardiner	Banjo	Torvill	Dean	Total score	Music	Result
Kem & Alex	1	8.5	8.5	9.0	9.0	73.0	"Timber" — Pitbull, feat. Kesha	Eliminated
Kem & Alex	5	9.5	9.5	9.5	9.5	73.0	"Beneath Your Beautiful" — Labrinth, feat. Emeli Sandé	Eliminated
Max & Ale	2	9.0	9.5	9.5	9.5	73.5	"You Really Got Me" — The Kinks	Bottom two
Max & Ale	6	9.0	9.0	9.0	9.0	73.5	"Picture of You" — Boyzone	Bottom two
Brooke & Matej	3	8.0	8.5	8.0	8.5	67.5	"Who Do You Think You Are" — Spice Girls	Safe
Brooke & Matej	7	8.5	8.5	8.5	9.0	67.5	"One Last Time" — Ariana Grande	Safe
Jake & Vanessa	4	8.0	9.5	9.5	9.5	76.5	"Sweet Disposition" — The Temper Trap	Safe
Jake & Vanessa	8	10.0	10.0	10.0	10.0	76.5	"Stay" — Shakespears Sister	Safe

Save Me skates

- Kem & Alex: "There's Nothing Holdin' Me Back" — Shawn Mendes
- Max & Ale: "I Won't Give Up" — Jason Mraz

Judges' votes to save

- Gardiner: Max & Ale
- Banjo: Max & Ale
- Dean: Max & Ale
- Torvill: Did not vote, but would have voted to save Max & Ale

=== Week 10: Finale (11 March) ===
Torvill & Dean performance: "The Impossible Dream (The Quest)" — Andy Williams

No scores were issued by the judges for any of the performances.

Couples are listed in the order they performed.

Couple	Order	Music	Result
Jake & Vanessa	1	"A Little Less Conversation" — Elvis Presley vs. JXL	Winners
Jake & Vanessa	4	"Canned Heat" — Jamiroquai	Winners
Brooke & Matej	2	"Genie in a Bottle" — Christina Aguilera	Runners-up
Brooke & Matej	5	"Sing Sing Sing" — Bebo Best & The Super Lounge Orchestra	Runners-up
Max & Ale	3	"Born to Be Wild" — Steppenwolf	Third place
Max & Ale	6	"Perfect" — Ed Sheeran	Third place

== Ratings ==
Official ratings are taken from BARB.

Episode	Date	Total viewers (millions)	ITV weekly ranking
Live show 1	7 January	8.63	2
Live show 2	14 January	7.02	14
Live show 3	21 January	6.73	14
Live show 4	28 January	6.22	14
Live show 5	4 February	5.74	15
Live show 6	11 February	5.49	17
Live show 7	18 February	5.43	18
Live show 8	25 February	5.67	15
Live semi-final	4 March	5.67	17
Live final	11 March	6.05	14
