= Łukasz Różycki =

Polish pair skater

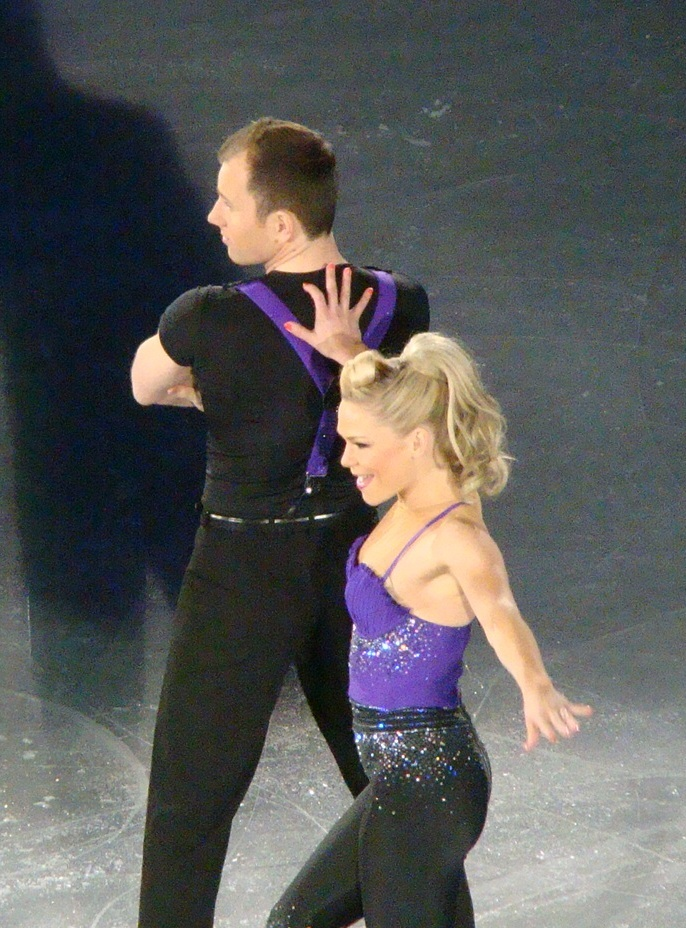
Różycki and Alexandra Schauman on the Dancing on Ice tour in 2011.

Łukasz Różycki ([wuˈkaʂ ruˈʐɨt͡ski]; born 13 December 1979 in Warsaw, Poland) is a Polish pair skater who competed with Aneta Kowalska. He is married to Finnish skater Alexandra Schauman.

== Competitive highlights ==
Event / Season	1997–1998	1998–1999
World Junior Championships	16th	17th
Junior Grand Prix – Grand Prize SNP	7th	8th
Junior Grand Prix – Sofia Cup	–	3rd
Junior Grand Prix – Hungarian Cup	5th	–

== Dancing on Ice ==
In January 2011, Różycki had joined the professional dancers cast for Dancing on Ice. He was paired with Elen Rivas, but they did not qualify for the live shows and were eliminated. In January 2012, Różycki was paired with EastEnders actress, Laila Morse, but due an injury on Morse's rib, the couple were eliminated in 15th place. In January 2014, he was partnered with previous series champion Beth Tweddle. They reached the final and finished third. He returned to the series in its eleventh series in 2019, partnering with actress Didi Conn. He returned for series 12 in 2020, partnered with Trisha Goddard, but they became the first couple to be eliminated. He returned for the 13th series in 2021, partnering with Myleene Klass. They were the first couple to be eliminated, making Różycki the first professional skater on the show to be eliminated first twice in a row.
