= List of figure skaters =

Lists of figure skaters are grouped by discipline and include the following:

- List of figure skaters (men's singles)
- List of figure skaters (women's singles)
- List of figure skaters (pair skating)
- List of figure skaters (ice dance)
