= Red Nose Day 2013 =

Fundraising event organised by Comic Relief

- Also known as: Red Nose Day 2013: Do Something Funny for Money
- Genre: Telethon
- Presented by: Lenny Henry; Michael McIntyre; Davina McCall; Claudia Winkleman; Rob Brydon; Dermot O'Leary; John Bishop; Jonathan Ross; Jack Whitehall; Zoe Ball; David Walliams; Alan Carr; Russell Brand
- Country of origin: United Kingdom
- Original language: English

Production
- Executive producer: Richard Curtis
- Production location: BBC Television Centre
- Camera setup: Multiple

Original release
- Network: BBC One, BBC Two
- Release: 15 March 2013

Related
- Red Nose Day 2011; Red Nose Day 2015; Let's Dance for Comic Relief

Red Nose Day 2013 is a fundraising event organised by Comic Relief. A number of run-up events took place and the main event consisted of a live telethon broadcast on BBC One and BBC Two from the evening of Friday 15 March 2013 to early the following morning.

== Results ==
The sum for the 14th Red Nose Day includes:

- £10,512,406 raised by Sainsbury’s, itself the biggest single donation ever received on the night of Red Nose Day.
- The Through Hell and High Water challenge raised £1,196,000
- Miranda Hart's Mad March raised £1,140,615 towards the total

== Main event ==
The live telethon was broadcast on BBC One and BBC Two from the evening of Friday 15 March 2013 to early the following morning as well as a number of run-up events and was presented by Lenny Henry, Michael McIntyre, Davina McCall, Claudia Winkleman, Rob Brydon, Dermot O'Leary, John Bishop, Jonathan Ross, Jack Whitehall, David Tennant, David Walliams, Alan Carr and Russell Brand.

=== Presenters ===
| Times (approx) | Presenters |
|---|---|
| 19:00 – 20:10 | Dermot O'Leary & Claudia Winkleman |
| 20:10 – 21:20 | Rob Brydon & Michael McIntyre |
| 21:20 – 22:35 | Davina McCall & John Bishop |
| 22:35 – 23:30 | Jonathan Ross & Jack Whitehall |
| 23:30 – 23:50 | Jonathan Ross, Jack Whitehall & Zoe Ball |
| 23:50 – 01:10 | Alan Carr & David Walliams |
| 01:10 – 01:55 | Russell Brand |
| 01:55 – 03:30 | Nick Grimshaw |

=== Appeal Film Presenters ===
Stars including Davina McCall, Lenny Henry, Rob Brydon, Brenda Blethyn, Bill Nighy, Jonathan Ross and One Direction presented appeal films.

=== Official Single ===
One Direction recorded the official single "One Way Or Another (Teenage Kicks)".

=== Sketches and Features ===
| Title | Brief Description | Starring |
|---|---|---|
| Simon Cowell's wedding | Simon Cowell marries... Simon Cowell, but the wedding doesn't go as smoothly as he'd hoped | Simon Cowell, David Walliams, Olly Murs, Louis Walsh, Dermot O'Leary, Sharon Osbourne, Robbie Williams, Peter Dickson, Rylan Clark, Amanda Holden, Alesha Dixon, Sinitta, Caroline Flack, Stacey Solomon, Ashleigh and Pudsey, Paul Potts, JLS, Spelbound, Jonathan and Charlotte, Stephen Mulhern, Stavros Flatley and the Showbears |
| One Born Every Minute meets Call the Midwife | Miranda Hart stars in a mini-episode of Call the Midwife where the Doctor comes to help Jedward's parents give birth | Miranda Hart and Matt Smith |
| Live from Lambeth Palace | Rowan Atkinson acts as the new Archbishop of Canterbury | Rowan Atkinson |
| MasterChef cook-off | Comedians Jack Whitehall and Micky Flanagan take part in a MasterChef cook-off | Jack Whitehall, Micky Flanagan, Dame Edna Everage, John Torode, Michel Roux, Jr. and Gregg Wallace |
| EastEnders | A mini-episode of the soap opera EastEnders surrounding a gang storyline with Liam Butcher and Bianca Butcher | Patsy Palmer, James Forde, Lindsey Coulson and Shona McGarty |
| Peter Kay ~~Stand up~~ Sit down for Comic Relief | Peter Kay travels from Belfast to London raising money, battling Glaucoma, Cramps and Chapped lips, by doing what he does best, sitting down. | Peter Kay, Brian Conley, Rusty Lee, Yvette Fielding, Chico Slimani, Gail Porter, Peter Simon, Yazz, Gordon Burns, Dermot Murnaghan, Phillip Schofield, Holly Willoughby, Lorraine Kelly, Eamonn Holmes, narrated by David Walliams |
| Smithy | After being patronised by Michael McIntyre for raising only £64 in an 'Essex Bake-off', Smithy gatecrashes the stage and starts a rant, in which he debunks the entire celebrity aspect of Red Nose Day and other telethons. The cameras follow him as he leaves Television Centre to give a meaningful, heartfelt, yet comedic speech about how Comic Relief is actually about the fundraisers. | James Corden, Michael McIntyre |
| The Vicar of Dibley | Geraldine and the parishioners head to London to vote on the ordination of women as bishops, but make the mistake of sending Jim to cast the vote. Meanwhile, Geraldine flirts with an attractive vicar and Frank's failing hearing leads him to make some major slip ups | Dawn French and Damian Lewis |
| The Office: Revisited | David Brent starts a new career as a talent manager in the music industry, trying to help urban solo artist Dom Johnson (Doc Brown) secure his big break. | Ricky Gervais and Doc Brown |
| Equality Street | The music video created by David Brent and Dom Johnson | Ricky Gervais and Doc Brown |
| The Royle Family | A message from the Royle Family about how they've been fundraising | Cast of The Royle Family |
| Fresh Meat | The cast of Fresh Meat are challenged to travel UK Universities to raise money for Comic Relief | Cast of Fresh Meat |
| Ron Burgundy | A message from the Anchorman about Comic Relief | Will Ferrell |
| Mrs Brown's Boys | Mrs Brown reports live from her local pub to the studio | Brendan O'Carroll, Jennifer Gibney, Davina McCall, Jonathan Ross and John Bishop |
| Russell Howard's Good News | A special edition of the show | Russell Howard |
| The Morgana Show | Special messages from Sir David Attenborough and Adele | Morgana Robinson |
| David's Exes | David Walliams is told he has an STD and he needs to tell all of the people he's been intimate with over the last year. | David Walliams, Christian Jessen, Kate Moss, the Chuckle Brothers, Richard and Judy, Christopher Biggins, Mary Beard, Clare Balding, Ronnie Corbett, Alan Carr, Frank Lampard, Bruno Tonioli, Len Goodman, John Prescott, David Gandy, Gwyneth Paltrow, Keith Harris, Orville the Duck, David Schwimmer and Hugh Grant. |
| Songs of Praise | Songs of Praise Hymnathon | Aled Jones and Tim Vine |

=== Musical Performances ===
| Artist | Song | Notes |
|---|---|---|
| One Direction | "One Way or Another (Teenage Kicks)" | The official Comic Relief song for this year. |
| Snow Patrol | "Lifening" | |
| Tom Odell | "Another Love" | |

=== Music Videos ===
| Artist | Song | Notes |
|---|---|---|
| Ricky Gervais as David Brent | "Equality Street" | |
| James with Peter Kay | "Sit Down" | |

== Within other shows ==
TV programmes that lead up to the main event included:

- The Great Comic Relief Bake Off
- Great British Menu for Comic Relief
- Let's Dance for Comic Relief
- Comic Relief Does Glee Club
- Comic Relief's Big Chat with Graham Norton
- Comic Relief: Through Hell and High Water
- Grimmy's Comic Relief Late Nighter

== Before main event ==
=== Comic Relief's Big Chat with Graham Norton ===
On Thursday 7 March 2013 at 7:00pm GMT, Graham Norton began his challenge - To Host The Longest Chat Show Ever for Comic Relief. Whilst doing this Norton broke the Guinness World Record for 'The Most Questions Asked on a TV Chat Show'. In the process he raised £1,022,982 for Comic Relief. Guests for the evening included Sir Terry Wogan, Russell Tovey, Jimmy Carr, Martin Freeman, Keith Lemon, Ronnie Corbett and Warwick Davis.

=== Comic Relief does Glee Club ===
In March 2013, Comic Relief Does Glee Club returned to BBC One, which lets a group perform music in three varieties (choir, musical theatre and contemporary). This programme was presented by Sam Nixon, Mark Rhodes and Naomi Wilkinson.

=== Let's Dance for Comic Relief ===
The fifth series of Let's Dance for Comic Relief was broadcast between 16 February and 9 March 2013. It was won by Antony Cotton with Jodie Prenger in 2nd place.

=== Miranda's Mad March ===
Between 10 and 15 March, Miranda Hart was given a challenge, one week to complete five challenges, in five cities across England. The first day, Miranda attempted to break the Guinness World Record for the most armpits waxed in three minutes. The second day, Miranda took part in a Strictly Extravaganza, in which she attempted to dance ballroom with Strictly Come Dancing professional dancer Pasha Kovalev. The third day saw Miranda, singing with her new girlband 'Onesie Direction'. The fourth day saw Miranda take part in a dog show. The fifth and final day saw Miranda plan a wedding in one day. Miranda's Mad March raised £1,140,615 for Comic Relief.

=== Comic Relief: Through Hell and High Water ===
On Thursday 14 March 2013 at 20:00 GMT, BBC One aired a documentary called Comic Relief: Through Hell and High Water, the programme followed six celebrities as they took part in the Zambezi River challenge. Jack Dee, Dara Ó Briain, Melanie C, Chelsee Healey, Greg James and Phillips Idowu. The challenge was a bid to raise £1,000,000 for Comic Relief. The total which was announced on 15 March 2013, totalled to £1,196,000 from this challenge alone.

=== Grimmy's Comic Relief Late Nighter ===
Nick Grimshaw presented the final slot of the 2013 telethon in which he was joined by various celebrity guests.

=== Other events ===
A series of celebrities took part in Dares. These included Jessie J who had her hair shaved off for Comic Relief.

== Donation progress ==
- Sainsbury’s broke their own record from 2011 for the single biggest cheque that Comic Relief has received by raising £10,512,406.

| Time | Amount | Large donations |
|---|---|---|
| 19:56 GMT | £4,498,898 | BT (£507,329) |
| 21:13 GMT | £20,295,015 | British Airways (£2,001,025), TK Maxx (£3,730,385) |
| 22:28 GMT | £57,920,738 | Sainsbury’s (£10,512,406)*, Miranda's Mad March (£1,140,615), Mars/Maltesers (£1,322,122) |
| 23:49 GMT | £66,516,370 | Through Hell and High Water (£1,196,000) |
| 01:55 GMT | £75,107,851 | |
