= Sam & Mark =

English popular music and TV presenting duo

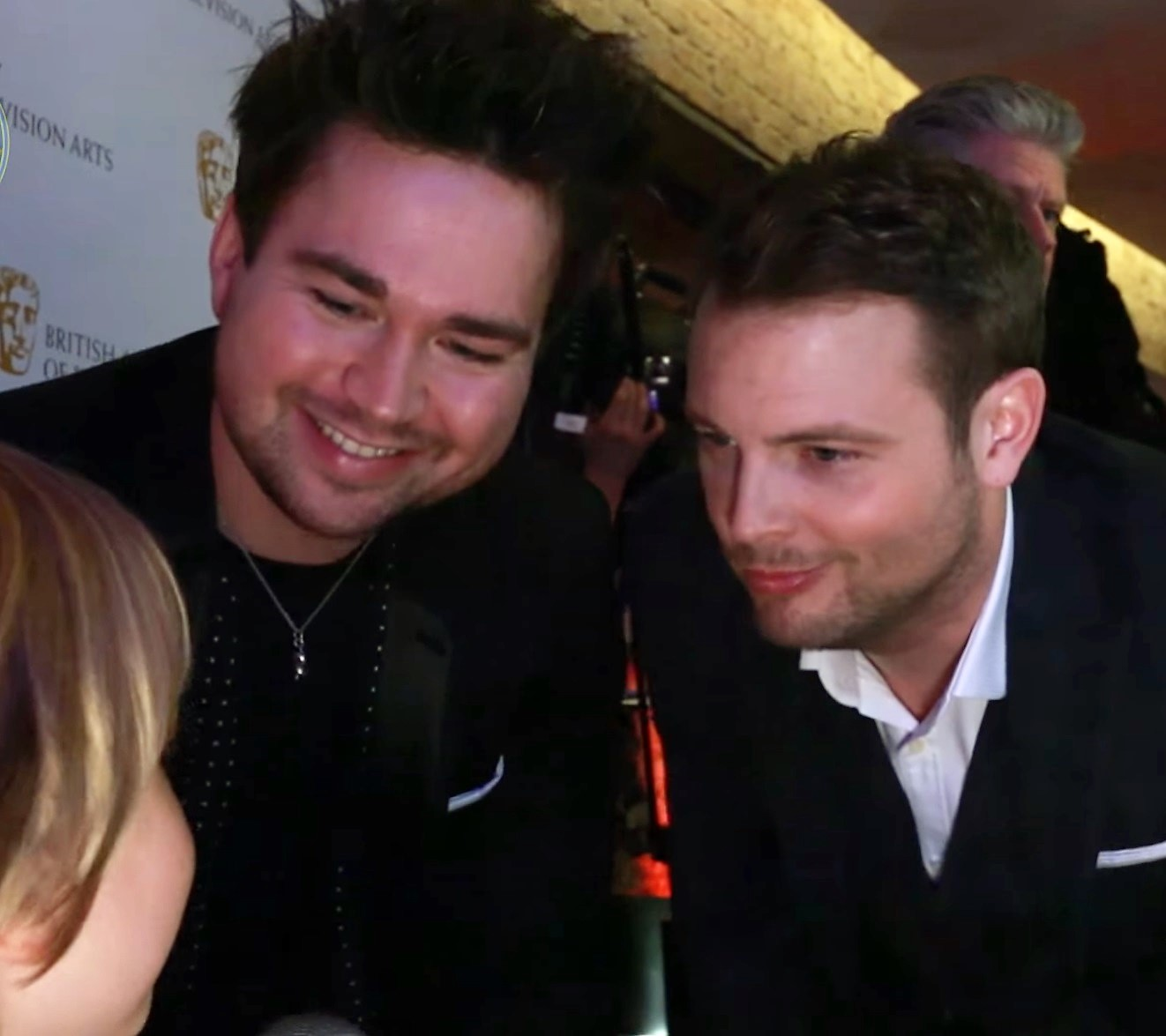
- Child interviews Sam Nixon and Mark Rhodes at the British Academy Children's Awards in 2015

Background information
- Genres: Pop singers / Radio and television presenters
- Years active: 2004–present
- Members: Sam Nixon; Mark Rhodes

Sam Nixon and Mark Rhodes, known collectively as Sam & Mark or Smark, are an English popular music and television presenting duo. They previously competed on the second series of Pop Idol in 2003, in which they finished third and second, respectively, behind winner Michelle McManus. Since then, Sam & Mark have had a successful career in radio and television in the UK, particularly in children’s entertainment.

== Music career ==
Sam Nixon and Mark Rhodes competed on the second series of Pop Idol in 2003. Nixon finished third, while Rhodes came second behind winner Michelle McManus. After Pop Idol, they decided to form a duo, and signed with manager Simon Fuller. Sam & Mark released a cover of The Beatles' "With a Little Help from My Friends" as a single on Fuller's label S. The song entered the UK Singles Chart at No. 1.

However, their follow-up single, "The Sun Has Come Your Way", released by UMTV, reached only number 19. Consequently, the pair, while working for CBBC, were informed that they were no longer allowed to release music, as Sam and Mark had signed a deal with Fearne Cotton for a period of two years to perform both live and pre-recorded shows. This resulted in Fuller signing the duo out of their label and contracts, as they were concentrating on children's shows on CBBC.

== Broadcasting career ==
=== Radio hosts ===
In January 2003, Sam & Mark started a career in radio presenting. First, they hosted Saturdays 10am–1pm and Sundays 11am–3pm on Gem, before moving to weekdays 9am–1pm on 6 June 2005, with the chance to interview the biggest stars on their show. They left Gem on 2 June 2006. On 11 March 2007, they began hosting Smash Hits on Sunday at breakfast, from 7–11am. On 31 December 2007, they hosted a whole night of DJ sets on BBC Radio 1 to see in the new year from 6pm–5am. Their last Sunday Smash Hits Breakfast show was on 26 December 2010.

Sam & Mark were due to return to Gem on 1 January 2011 to host Saturday Night Gem Anthems; however, three hours before they were due on air, they could not host it. On 5 August 2011, Sam & Mark were told that they could not host any more radio shows.

Starting in 2009 and ending in 2015, the duo presented a radio show, which can be heard on Free Radio across Coventry and Warwickshire on Sunday mornings, from 11:00 am until 1:00 pm.

Nixon also did cover work for BBC Radio Leeds.

=== Television hosts ===
Sam & Mark have subsequently had a successful career as children's TV presenters, hosting various BBC programmes, such as TMi, Top of the Pops Reloaded, Copycats, Sam and Mark's Guide to Dodging Disaster, Sam & Mark's Big Friday Wind-Up, Junior Bake Off, and Crackerjack! on CBBC.

Sam & Mark hosted CBBC's weekday morning breakfast show Level Up for four months, from 3 April to 1 September 2006. On 16 September 2006, they hosted the first episode of TMi, a new Saturday morning TV show for the BBC on BBC Two and the CBBC Channel, alongside presenter Caroline Flack. The third series of the show ended in December 2008, and the BBC confirmed a fourth series of the Saturday morning series for CBBC.

In 2007, Sam & Mark presented a show for CBBC, Do Something Different. Beginning on 3 January 2009, Sam and Mark's Who Wants to be a Superhero? began to air, in which children competed to be a new superhero for Stan Lee. They were also asked to perform on Children in Need in 2007.

In January 2010, they began a new show, Jump Nation, which is similar to Skate Nation, another programme they presented. They were also on a celebrity special of Total Wipeout. Neither won, losing to glamour model Danielle Lloyd. In Sam and Mark's Guide to Dodging Disaster for CBBC, they were in non-speaking roles, with a voice over by Hugh Dennis. They have also presented the competition segment of This Morning on ITV1. On 28 April 2010, Sam and Mark presented an On the Box segment for This Morning, in which they reviewed the latest TV shows, DVDs and movies. They then appeared on a CBBC series, Copycats. A show similar to the TMi series, but called Sam and Mark's TMi Friday, began in September 2010, and finished in December; it was then cancelled.

For Red Nose Day 2011, the two presented a series called Comic Relief does Glee Club, which had five 45-minute episodes, four of which were live, on BBC One. In 2012, this continued with Sport Relief does Glee Club, which had eight 30-minute episodes on CBBC and two live episodes on BBC One and CBBC. In 2013, a new series of Comic Relief does Glee Club, hosted by Naomi Wilkinson, aired. Sam and Mark joined Naomi for the last five of the 45-minute heats.

From 2011, the duo had their own series called Sam & Mark's Big Friday Wind-Up. Similar to a prank show, the programme featured celebrity guests each week.

In 2012, Sam and Mark competed against each other in ITV's Dancing on Ice, which also included Rosemary Conley, Charlene Tilton, Jennifer Ellison and Chico; Mark was third to leave, while Sam left in week 9.

In 2013, Sam and Mark co-hosted a Channel 5 special, The Great Christmas Toy Giveaway, alongside Myleene Klass. The two-hour show featured guests, toy reviews, music and videos previewing the toys and games available for Christmas; it also included a competition to win more than £10,000 worth of toys.

In 2020, the BBC's revival of Crackerjack! was presented by the duo.

They presented series 3 and 4 of BBC1's Junior Bake Off in 2015 and 2016.

In 2026, Sam & Mark appeared as themselves in Andy and the Band.

== Sam and Mark: On the Road Show (2017) ==
Sam and Mark began a tour of Butlins holiday camps from February 2017, performing a new game show similar to their TV shows, such as Sam and Mark's Big Friday Wind Up, TMi and Copycats. The tour ended on 3 September the same year.

== Discography ==
=== Singles ===
Title	Year	Peak chart positions		Album
Title	Year	UK	IRL	Album
"With a Little Help from My Friends" (Note: Track listing: 1. "With a Little Help from My Friends"; 2. "Measure of a Man"; 3. Enhanced content: "With a Little Help from My Friends" video and a picture gallery)	2004	1	22	Non-album singles
"The Sun Has Come Your Way" (Note: Track listing: 1. "The Sun Has Come Your Way"; 2. "I'm Gonna Be With You"; 3. "These Days")	2004	19	—	Non-album singles

== Books ==
- The Adventures of Long Arm (2 August 2015)
- The Adventures of Long Arm 2: Long Arm vs The Evil Supply Teacher (3 March 2016)

== See also ==
- Sam Nixon
- Mark Rhodes
