= The Sun Has Come Your Way =

Single by Sam & Mark
- B-side: "I'm Gonna Be with You"; "These Days"
- Released: 24 May 2004
- Genre: Pop
- Length: 3:17
- Label: 19
- Songwriters: Peter Agren; Tobias Karlsson
- Producer: David Eriksen

Sam & Mark singles chronology
"With a Little Help from My Friends" (2004)	"The Sun Has Come Your Way" (2004)

"The Sun Has Come Your Way" is a song written by Peter Agren and Tobias Karlsson and produced by David Eriksen. The song was recorded by Pop Idol contestants Sam Nixon and Mark Rhodes, under their collective name Sam & Mark and was released as a single in May 2004. The single peaked at number 19 in the United Kingdom.

== Track listing ==
1. "The Sun Has Come Your Way" – 3:17
2. "I'm Gonna Be with You" – 2:35
3. "These Days" – 4:14

== Charts ==
Chart (2004)	Peak position
UK Singles (Official Charts)	19
