= Mark Rhodes =

English singer (born 1981)

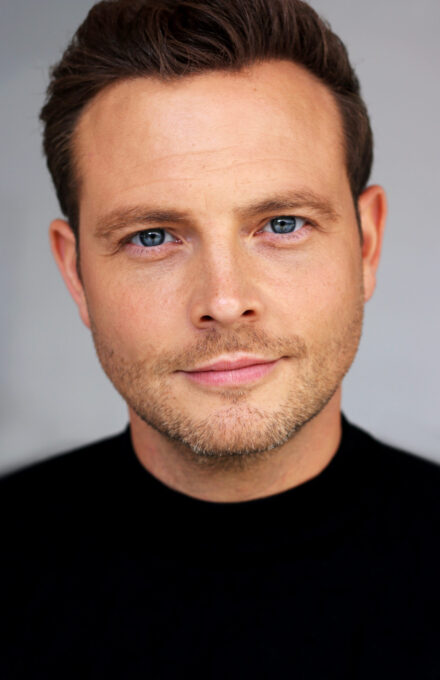
- Rhodes in 2022
- Born: Mark Thomas Rhodes; 11 September 1981 (age 45); Darlaston, Walsall, England
- Occupations: Singer; television presenter
- Years active: 2003–present
- Known for: Pop Idol; Top of the Pops Reloaded; TMi; Copycats; Sam & Mark's Big Friday Wind-Up
- Spouse: Harriet Wilson (m. 2012)
- Children: 2

Mark Thomas Rhodes (born 11 September 1981) is an English singer and television presenter, best known as one half of Sam & Mark, the other being Sam Nixon.

== Career ==
Born in Wolverhampton, England, Rhodes finished in second place in the second series of Pop Idol in the United Kingdom, as runner-up to Michelle McManus. After Pop Idol, he teamed up with third-place Sam Nixon, releasing two singles under the name Sam & Mark. In February 2004, their cover of the song "With a Little Help from My Friends" reached number 1 in the UK singles chart, remaining there for one week. Their second single 'The Sun Has Come Your Way" reached 19 in the singles chart. The pair were subsequently encouraged by manager Simon Fuller to pursue a career in TV.

Rhodes went on to co-present Top of the Pops Reloaded with Nixon and Fearne Cotton in 2004. From April 2006, Rhodes co-hosted the weekday children's breakfast show Level Up on BBC Two alongside Nixon and Ayesha Asantewaa. Level Up finished its first series in September 2006.

In September 2006, Rhodes began presenting BBC Two's Saturday morning show TMi alongside Nixon and Caroline Flack. He had his own short segment on the show called "Question Mark", a feature where he tried to answer viewers' questions, but Flack and Nixon talked through it. In later series, Flack left and the show moved to Fridays. The show's final episode aired on 17 December 2010. He also co-presented Do Something Different with Nixon and Ayesha Asantewaa. Nixon and Rhodes produced a children's reality series, Who Wants to Be a Superhero? and Sam and Mark's Guide to Dodging Disaster.

In 2009, Rhodes co-presented the show Skate Nation on BBC Two. He presented a Total Wipeout Celebrity Special, which aired on 2 January 2010. Rhodes fell at the quarter-final stage, losing out to eventual winner Danielle Lloyd. They subsequently took part in two episodes of Hole in the Wall, airing on 11 October 2008 and 14 November 2009.

Rhodes competed in the 2012 series of Dancing on Ice. He was eliminated by the judges on 22 January after a skate-off with Dallas actress Charlene Tilton.

Sam & Mark were the hosts of CBBC family game show Copycats.

In 2024 Rhodes began presenting a Saturday morning show on BBC Radio WM.

== Awards and nominations ==
BAFTA Best Children’s Presenter

Winner:

2013 (Sam and Mark's Big Friday Wind Up)

2015 (Sam and Mark's Big Friday Wind Up)

Nominations:

2007, 2013, 2014, 2015, 2017, 2018 and 2019

BAFTA Best Children's Entertainment Show

Winner:

2016 (Sam and Mark's Big Friday Wind Up)

Nominations:

2014, 2015 and 2016

RTS North West Awards Best Entertainment Show

Winner:

2015 (Sam and Mark’s Big Friday Wind Up)

2021 (Crackerjack)

Nominations:

2013, 2015 and 2021

Arqiva Commercial Radio Awards Best Newcomer:

Nomination:

2011

== Personal life ==
Rhodes attended Darlaston Comprehensive High School in Darlaston in the West Midlands. Rhodes splits his time between his house in St Margarets, London, and his family house in Wolverhampton, where he is regularly seen socialising in the village of Wombourne.

He got engaged in March 2011 and married his girlfriend Harriet Wilson on 2 June 2012. They now have a daughter, Scarlett and a son, Teddy, born at the end of April 2016.

Rhodes is a Wolverhampton Wanderers fan and played on the All Stars side at Matt Murray's testimonial match in 2011. He also played in Jody Craddock's testimonial match as part of a Wolves XI at Molineux in 2014.

== Pop Idol 2 performances ==
| Week | Theme | Song Choice | Original Artist | Result |
|---|---|---|---|---|
| Top 50 | | "She's Like The Wind" | Patrick Swayze | 20.3% (2/10) |
| Top 12 | Your Pop Idol | "With Or Without You" | U2 | Bottom 3 |
| Top 10 | Birthyear Songs | "Imagine" | John Lennon | Safe |
| Top 8 | Elton John Songs | "Something About The Way You Look Tonight" | Elton John | Safe |
| Top 7 | Disco | "More Than A Woman" | Bee Gees | Bottom 3 |
| Top 6 | The Beatles | "Help!" | The Beatles | Bottom 3 |
| Top 5 | Big Band | "Have You Met Miss Jones?" | Frank Sinatra | Safe |
| Top 4 | Christmas Songs | "Merry Christmas Everybody" | Slade | Bottom 2 |
| Top 4 | Christmas Songs | "Blue Christmas" | Elvis Presley | Bottom 2 |
| Top 3 | Judges' Choice | "Back For Good" | Take That | Safe |
| Top 3 | Judges' Choice | "If You Don't Know Me By Now" | Harold Melvin & The Blue Notes | Safe |
| Final | Contestant's Choice | "She's Like The Wind" | Patrick Swayze | Runner-up |
| Final | B Side | "Measure of a Man" | Clay Aiken | Runner-up |
| Final | Winner's Single | "All This Time" | To be released by the winner. The eventual winner was Michelle McManus | Runner-up |

== Filmography ==
| Year | Title | Notes |
|---|---|---|
| 2003 | Pop Idol | Contestant |
| 2004–2006 | Top of the Pops Reloaded | Co-presenter |
| 2006 | Level Up | Main presenter with Sam Nixon |
| 2006–2010 | TMi | Main presenter with Sam Nixon and Caroline Flack |
| 2007 | Do Something Different | Main presenter |
| 2008 | SMart | Guest presenter |
| 2008 | Sam and Mark's Guide to Dodging Disaster | Main presenter with Sam Nixon |
| 2009 | Who Wants to Be a Superhero? | Main presenter |
| 2009 | Skate Nation | Main presenter with Sam Nixon |
| 2010 | Jump Nation | Main presenter with Sam Nixon |
| 2010–2016 | Copycats | Main presenter with Sam Nixon |
| 2011–2014 | Comic Relief Does Glee Club | Main presenter with Sam Nixon |
| 2011–2019 | Sam & Mark's Big Friday Wind-Up | Main presenter with Sam Nixon |
| 2012 | Dancing on Ice | Contestant |
| 2013 | Hacker Time | Guest |
| 2014–2015,2018 | The Dog Ate My Homework | Contestant; 3 episodes |
| 2015–2016 | Junior Bake Off | Main presenter with Sam Nixon |
| 2016-2017 | Match of the Day: Can You Kick It | Main presenter with Sam Nixon |
| 2017 | Ready or Not | Main presenter with Sam Nixon |
| 2020-2021 | Crackerjack | Main presenter with Sam Nixon |
| 2022 | The One Show | VT Presenter |
| 2022 | The All Star Games for Sport Relief | Contestant |

== Discography ==
=== Singles ===
as Sam & Mark

- "With a Little Help from My Friends" (February 2004)
- "The Sun Has Come Your Way" (May 2004)

== See also ==
- Sam & Mark
- Sam Nixon
- Wombourne
