= Dancing on Ice series 7 =

Seventh series of Dancing on Ice

Dancing on Ice
- Series 7
- Presented by: Phillip Schofield; Christine Bleakley
- Judges: Robin Cousins; Louie Spence; Katarina Witt
- Celebrity winner: Matthew Wolfenden
- Professional winner: Nina Ulanova
- No. of episodes: 23

Release
- Original network: ITV
- Original release: 8 January – 25 March 2012

Series chronology
- ← Previous; Series 6 Next → Series 8

The seventh series of Dancing on Ice aired from on 8 January to 25 March 2012, on ITV. Phillip Schofield returned as presenter, but Holly Willoughby was replaced by Christine Bleakley. Jayne Torvill and Christopher Dean returned to mentor the celebrities, with Karen Barber returning as head coach. This series was judged by Robin Cousins, Louie Spence, and Katarina Witt. The show moved back to its original location of Elstree Studios, which had been used during the show's first five series, but still used the same layout introduced in the previous series.

Emmerdale actor Matthew Wolfenden and Nina Ulanova won the series on 25 March 2012, while Hollyoaks actress Jorgie Porter and Matt Evers finished in second place, and The X Factor contestant Chico and Jodeyne Higgins finished in third.

== Couples ==
In October 2011, it was reported that Keith Chegwin was originally part of the line-up however he withdrew due to injury. He would go on to compete in the following series. Chesney Hawkes was announced to be competing in the series, however was forced to withdraw after sustaining injuries, and was therefore replaced by Chico. On 24 January 2012, it was revealed that the 12 remaining couples would be going head-to-head in individual skating battles, where each couple were paired up and performed their own routine at the same time to the same song. The judges then decided which couple they thought skated best, automatically guaranteeing them a place in the following week's show. They did not hand out any scores. At the end of the battles, the six couples who did not receive immunity from the judges faced the public vote, where one couple was eliminated.

Celebrity	Notability	Professional partner	Status
Andy Akinwolere	Blue Peter presenter	Maria Filippov	Eliminated 1st on 8 January 2012
Laila Morse	EastEnders actress	Łukasz Różycki	Eliminated 2nd on 15 January 2012
Mark Rhodes	Children's television presenter	Frankie Poultney	Eliminated 3rd on 22 January 2012
Corey Feldman	Hollywood actor	Brooke Castile	Eliminated 4th on 29 January 2012
Charlene Tilton	Dallas actress	Matthew Gonzalez	Eliminated 5th on 5 February 2012
Rosemary Conley	Businesswoman, author & broadcaster	Mark Hanretty	Eliminated 6th on 12 February 2012
Heidi Range	Sugababes singer	Andrei Lipanov	Eliminated 7th on 19 February 2012
Sébastien Foucan	Freerunner	Brianne Delcourt	Eliminated 8th on 19 February 2012
Sam Nixon	Children's television presenter	Alexandra Schauman	Eliminated 9th on 26 February 2012
Andy Whyment	Coronation Street actor	Vicky Ogden	Eliminated 10th on 4 March 2012
Chemmy Alcott	World Cup alpine ski racer	Sean Rice	Eliminated 11th on 11 March 2012
Jennifer Ellison	Actress	Daniel Whiston	Eliminated 12th on 18 March 2012
Chico	The X Factor contestant	Jodeyne Higgins	Third place on 25 March 2012
Jorgie Porter	Hollyoaks actress	Matt Evers	Runners-up on 25 March 2012
Matthew Wolfenden	Emmerdale actor	Nina Ulanova	Winners on 25 March 2012

== Scoring chart ==
The highest score each week is indicated in bold green with a dagger (†), while the lowest score each week is indicated in italicized red with a double-dagger (‡).

Color key:

Winners
Runners-up
Third place
Bottom two or three
Eliminated

Dancing on Ice (series 7) - Weekly scores
Couple	Pl.	Week											
Couple	Pl.	1	2	3	4 (Note: This week featured celebrity duels. Couples were paired up to compete head-to-head, and the judges determined which of the two couples from each pairing won. That couple received immunity from elimination.)	5	6	7	8	9 (Note: This week featured team performances. The couples on the winning team had their scores doubled for the night.)	10	11	12
Matthew & Nina	1st	—N/a	**20.5**†	**21.5**†	Won	23.0	22.0	**28.0**†	26.0	28.5	**28.0**†	27.5+28.5=**56.0**†	30.0+28.5=58.5 (Note: This couple finished in first place.)
Jorgie & Matt	2nd	**18.5**†	—N/a	**21.5**†	Lost	**24.0**†	**26.0**†	25.5	**26.5**†	26.0×2=**52.0**†	23.0‡	27.5+27.0=54.5 (Note: This couple was in the bottom two or three, but was not eliminated.)	29.0+30.0=**59.0**† (Note: This couple finished in second place.)
Chico & Jodeyne	3rd	—N/a	18.5	18.0	Won	21.5	23.0	24.0	24.5	25.0	27.0	28.5+27.0=55.5	26.0+30.0=56.0‡ (Note: This couple finished in third place.)
Jennifer & Daniel	4th	—N/a	15.5	18.0	Lost	17.0	19.0	20.0	22.0	24.5×2=49.0	24.5	24.0+23.5=47.5‡ (Note: This couple was eliminated.)	
Chemmy & Sean	5th	16.0	—N/a	10.5	Won	20.0	18.5	22.0	21.5	25.5×2=51.0	26.0		
Andy W. & Vicky	6th	12.0	—N/a	14.0	Lost	17.5	17.5	19.5	19.0‡	20.5‡			
Sam & Alexandra	7th	—N/a	15.5	16.0	Lost	16.5	19.5	19.0	22.0				
Sébastien & Brianne	8th	—N/a	17.5	18.0	Won	21.5	21.0	22.0					
Heidi & Andrei	9th	12.5	—N/a	15.5	Won	16.5	14.0‡	17.5‡					
Rosemary & Mark	10th	—N/a	12.5	10.5	Won	17.0	15.5						
Charlene & Matthew	11th	13.0	—N/a	15.0	Lost	13.5‡							
Corey & Brooke	12th	—N/a	11.0	8.0‡	Lost								
Mark & Frankie	13th	8.0‡	—N/a	10.5									
Laila & Łukasz	14th	—N/a	9.5‡										
Andy A. & Maria	15th	14.0											

== Weekly scores ==
=== Week 1 (8 January) ===
Only half of the celebrities performed this week. Couples are listed in the order they performed.

Couple	Judges' scores			Total score	Music	Public vote	Points			Result
Couple	Spence	Cousins	Witt	Total score	Music	Public vote	Judges	Public	Total	Result
Heidi & Andrei	4.5	4.5	3.5	12.5	"E.T." — Katy Perry	5.90%	3	2	5	Bottom two
Mark & Frankie	2.0	3.0	3.0	8.0	"I'm Still Standing" — Elton John	11.37%	1	5	6	Safe
Charlene & Matthew	4.5	4.0	4.5	13.0	"Guilty" — Barbra Streisand & Barry Gibb	6.03%	4	3	7	Safe
Jorgie & Matt	6.0	6.5	6.0	18.5	"Skinny Love" — Birdy	17.86%	7	6	13	Safe
Chemmy & Sean	4.5	5.5	6.0	16.0	"Raise Your Glass" — P!nk	8.44%	6	4	10	Safe
Andy A. & Maria	3.5	5.0	5.5	14.0	"Moves Like Jagger" — Maroon 5, feat. Christina Aguilera	5.67%	5	1	6	Eliminated
Andy W. & Vicky	4.0	4.0	4.0	12.0	"Walk This Way" — Girls Aloud vs. Sugababes	44.73%	2	7	9	Safe

Judges' votes to save

- Spence: Heidi & Andrei
- Witt: Andy A & Maria
- Cousins: Heidi & Andrei

=== Week 2 (15 January) ===
- Guest performance: Kiss the Stars — Pixie Lott

Only half of the celebrities performed this week. Couples are listed in the order they performed.

Couple	Judges' scores			Total score	Music	Public vote	Points			Result
Couple	Spence	Cousins	Witt	Total score	Music	Public vote	Judges	Public	Total	Result
Jennifer & Daniel	5.5	5.0	5.0	15.5	"Bei Mir Bistu Shein" — The Puppini Sisters	10.73%	5	6	11	Safe
Sam & Alexandra	4.5	5.5	5.5	15.5	"Fascination" — Alphabeat	7.84%	5	3	8	Safe
Rosemary & Mark	3.5	4.5	4.5	12.5	"Fernando" — ABBA	13.81%	4	7	11	Safe
Laila & Łukasz	3.0	3.0	3.5	9.5	"My Guy" — Mary Wells	5.55%	2	1	3	Eliminated
Sébastien & Brianne	5.0	6.0	6.5	17.5	"Clocks" — Coldplay	8.26%	6	4	10	Safe
Chico & Jodeyne	6.0	6.0	6.5	18.5	"Wild Thing" — The Troggs	8.96%	7	5	12	Safe
Corey & Brooke	3.5	4.0	3.5	11.0	"Summer of '69" — Bryan Adams	6.00%	3	2	5	Bottom two
Matthew & Nina	7.0	6.5	7.0	20.5	"Give Me Everything" — Pitbull, feat. Ne-Yo, Afrojack & Nayer	38.85%	8	8	16	Safe

Judges' votes to save

- Spence: Corey & Brooke
- Witt: Corey & Brooke
- Cousins: Corey & Brooke

=== Week 3 (22 January) ===
Theme: Movie Night

Couples are listed in the order they performed.

Couple	Judges' scores			Total score	Music	Film	Public vote	Points			Result
Couple	Spence	Cousins	Witt	Total score	Music	Film	Public vote	Judges	Public	Total	Result
Chico & Jodeyne	6.5	5.5	6.0	18.0	"You've Lost That Lovin' Feelin'" — The Righteous Brothers	Top Gun	7.31	12	8	20	Safe
Rosemary & Mark	3.0	3.5	4.0	10.5	"Wind Beneath My Wings" — Bette Midler	Beaches	9.16	7	10	17	Safe
Sam & Alexandra	4.5	5.0	6.5	16.0	"Kung Fu Fighting" — Cee Lo Green & Jack Black	Kung Fu Panda	3.75	11	2	13	Safe
Chemmy & Sean	3.0	3.0	4.5	10.5	"Rescue Me" — Fontella Bass	Sister Act	5.18	7	5	12	Safe
Corey & Brooke	2.5	2.5	3.0	8.0	"Stand by Me" — Ben E. King	Stand by Me	4.53	6	4	10	Safe
Jennifer & Daniel	6.5	5.0	6.5	18.0	"Listen" — Beyoncé	Dreamgirls	7.29	12	7	19	Safe
Mark & Frankie	3.5	3.0	4.0	10.5	"Everybody Needs Somebody to Love" — The Blues Brothers	Blues Brothers	3.85	7	3	10	Eliminated
Jorgie & Matt	7.5	6.5	7.5	21.5	"9 to 5" — Dolly Parton	9 to 5	11.07	13	12	25	Safe
Matthew & Nina	6.0	8.0	7.5	21.5	"Night Fever" — The Bee Gees	Saturday Night Fever	21.14	13	13	26	Safe
Charlene & Matthew	5.0	4.0	6.0	15.0	"Diamonds Are a Girl's Best Friend" — Marilyn Monroe	Gentlemen Prefer Blondes	2.18	9	1	10	Bottom two
Sébastien & Brianne	5.0	6.5	6.5	18.0	"Mad World" — Michael Andrews, feat. Gary Jules	Donnie Darko	5.28	12	6	18	Safe
Andy & Vicky	4.5	4.5	5.0	14.0	"Grease" — Frankie Valli	Grease	10.77	8	11	19	Safe
Heidi & Andrei	5.0	5.0	5.5	15.5	"Goldfinger" — Shirley Bassey	Goldfinger	8.47	10	9	19	Safe

Judges' votes to save

- Spence: Charlene & Matthew
- Cousins: Charlene & Matthew
- Witt: Charlene & Matthew

=== Week 4 (29 January) ===
Tonight featured partner "duels". Two couples skated simultaneously to the same song, and the judges chose the couple who they thought skated the best to receive immunity for the week. The public then voted among the remaining six couples. Dueling pairs are listed in the order they performed.

Couple	Judges' scores			Music	Public vote	Points	Result
Couple	Spence	Cousins	Witt	Music	Public vote	Points	Result
Chico & Jodeyne	Yes	Yes	Yes	"Under Pressure" — Queen & David Bowie	Immunity		
Sam & Alexandra	No	No	No	"Under Pressure" — Queen & David Bowie	9.18%	3	Safe
Jennifer & Daniel	No	No	No	"Just Can't Get Enough" — The Black Eyed Peas	17.11%	4	Safe
Sébastien & Brianne	Yes	Yes	Yes	"Just Can't Get Enough" — The Black Eyed Peas	Immunity		
Chemmy & Sean	Yes	Yes	Yes	"Opposites Attract" — Paula Abdul	Immunity		
Corey & Brooke	No	No	No	"Opposites Attract" — Paula Abdul	3.19%	1	Eliminated
Charlene & Matthew	No	No	No	"Islands in the Stream" — Kenny Rogers & Dolly Parton	4.66%	2	Bottom two
Heidi & Andrei	Yes	Yes	Yes	"Islands in the Stream" — Kenny Rogers & Dolly Parton	Immunity		
Jorgie & Matt	No	No	Yes	"4 Minutes" — Madonna, feat. Justin Timberlake	36.72%	6	Safe
Matthew & Nina	Yes	Yes	No	"4 Minutes" — Madonna, feat. Justin Timberlake	Immunity		
Andy & Vicky	Yes	No	No	"Baby, It's Cold Outside" — Tom Jones & Cerys Matthews	29.14%	5	Safe
Rosemary & Mark	No	Yes	Yes	"Baby, It's Cold Outside" — Tom Jones & Cerys Matthews	Immunity		

Judges' votes to save

- Witt: Charlene & Matthew
- Cousins: Corey & Brooke
- Spence: Charlene & Matthew

=== Week 5 (5 February) ===
Theme: Pop Week

Guest performers: One Direction — "What Makes You Beautiful"/"One Thing"

Couples are listed in the order they performed.

Couple	Judges' scores			Total score	Pop music	Public vote	Points			Result
Couple	Spence	Cousins	Witt	Total score	Pop music	Public vote	Judges	Public	Total	Result
Jennifer & Daniel	6.0	5.5	5.5	17.0	"Vogue" — Madonna	8.24%	6	7	13	Safe
Sam & Alexandra	5.0	5.5	6.0	16.5	"Wake Me Up Before You Go-Go" — Wham!	5.38%	5	3	8	Bottom two
Charlene & Matthew	5.0	4.0	4.5	13.5	"Poker Face" — Lady Gaga	3.41%	4	1	5	Eliminated
Sébastien & Brianne	7.5	7.0	7.0	21.5	"Fire with Fire" — Scissor Sisters	5.66%	9	5	14	Safe
Heidi & Andrei	6.0	5.0	5.5	16.5	"Price Tag" — Jessie J	6.74%	5	6	11	Safe
Andy & Vicky	5.0	6.0	6.5	17.5	"I'm Gonna Be (500 Miles)" — The Proclaimers	17.54%	7	10	17	Safe
Chemmy & Sean	5.5	7.5	7.0	20.0	"The Loco-Motion" — Kylie Minogue	3.78%	8	2	10	Safe
Matthew & Nina	8.5	8.0	6.5	23.0	"The Look of Love" — ABC	21.89%	10	11	21	Safe
Chico & Jodeyne	7.5	7.0	7.0	21.5	"Don't Stop Movin'" — S Club 7	5.58%	9	4	13	Safe
Rosemary & Mark	4.5	5.5	7.0	17.0	"Perfect" — Fairground Attraction	8.86%	6	8	14	Safe
Jorgie & Matt	8.5	8.0	7.5	24.0	"...Baby One More Time" — Britney Spears	12.92%	11	9	20	Safe

Judges' votes to save

- Spence: Sam & Alexandra
- Cousins: Sam & Alexandra
- Witt: Sam & Alexandra

=== Week 6 (12 February) ===
Theme: Valentine's Day

Couples are listed in the order they performed.

Couple	Judges' scores			Total score	Music	Public vote	Points			Result
Couple	Spence	Cousins	Witt	Total score	Music	Public vote	Judges	Public	Total	Result
Matthew & Nina	7.0	7.5	7.5	22.0	"Everything" — Michael Bublé	20.72%	8	10	18	Safe
Chemmy & Sean	5.0	6.5	7.0	18.5	"I'm into You" — Jennifer Lopez, feat. Lil' Wayne	4.62%	4	2	6	Bottom two
Andy & Vicky	5.5	5.5	6.5	17.5	"Let's Get It On" — Marvin Gaye	15.08%	3	9	12	Safe
Heidi & Andrei	5.0	4.5	4.5	14.0	"Wherever You Will Go" — Charlene Soraia	11.23%	1	7	8	Safe
Jennifer & Daniel	7.5	5.5	6.0	19.0	"Fever" — Peggy Lee	9.73%	5	6	11	Safe
Chico & Jodeyne	8.5	7.0	7.5	23.0	"L-O-V-E" — Nat King Cole	6.23%	9	3	12	Safe
Rosemary & Mark	5.0	5.0	5.5	15.5	"I'll Stand by You" — Pretenders	6.83%	2	4	6	Eliminated
Sam & Alexandra	6.0	6.5	7.0	19.5	"Just the Way You Are" — Bruno Mars	9.03%	6	5	11	Safe
Jorgie & Matt	9.0	8.5	8.5	26.0	"Fallin'" — Alicia Keys	12.32%	10	8	18	Safe
Sébastien & Brianne	7.0	7.0	7.0	21.0	"My Cherie Amour" — Stevie Wonder	4.22%	7	1	8	Safe

Judges' votes to save

- Cousins: Chemmy & Sean
- Spence: Chemmy & Sean
- Witt: Chemmy & Sean

=== Week 7 (19 February) ===
Theme: Ultimate Skills Test
Required elements: Step sequence, unassisted jump, and spin on one foot with at least two rotations

Two couples were eliminated at the end of the night. Couples are listed in the order they performed.

Couple	Judges' scores			Total score	Music	Public vote	Points			Result
Couple	Spence	Cousins	Witt	Total score	Music	Public vote	Judges	Public	Total	Result
Chico & Jodeyne	8.0	8.0	8.0	24.0	"Mama Do the Hump" — Rizzle Kicks	6.28%	7	3	10	Safe
Chemmy & Sean	7.5	7.5	7.0	22.0	"Hold On" — Wilson Phillips	5.33%	6	2	8	Bottom three
Jennifer & Daniel	7.5	6.5	6.0	20.0	"Candyman" — Christina Aguilera	10.39%	5	6	11	Safe
Andy & Vicky	7.5	6.5	5.5	19.5	"Land of 1000 Dances" — Wilson Pickett	13.73%	4	8	12	Safe
Sébastien & Brianne	8.0	7.5	6.5	22.0	"Omen" — The Prodigy	3.39%	6	1	7	Eliminated
Jorgie & Matt	8.5	8.5	8.5	25.5	"Louder" — DJ Fresh, feat. Sian Evans	10.33%	8	5	13	Safe
Sam & Alexandra	7.0	6.5	5.5	19.0	"Lightning" — The Wanted	10.40%	3	7	10	Safe
Heidi & Andrei	7.0	5.5	5.0	17.5	"Push the Button" — Sugababes	10.09%	2	4	6	Eliminated
Matthew & Nina	9.0	9.5	9.5	28.0	"Without You" — David Guetta. feat. Usher	30.06%	9	9	18	Safe

=== Week 8 (26 February) ===
Theme: Rock Week

Couples are listed in the order they performed.

Couple	Judges' scores			Total score	Rock music	Public vote	Points			Result
Couple	Spence	Cousins	Witt	Total score	Rock music	Public vote	Judges	Public	Total	Result
Matthew & Nina	9.0	8.5	8.5	26.0	"Don't Stop Me Now" — Queen	24.87%	6	7	13	Safe
Chemmy & Sean	7.5	7.0	7.0	21.5	"Stronger (What Doesn't Kill You)" — Kelly Clarkson	11.15%	3	4	7	Safe
Jennifer & Daniel	8.0	7.0	7.0	22.0	"Total Eclipse of the Heart" — Bonnie Tyler	10.97%	4	3	7	Safe
Andy & Vicky	6.0	6.5	6.5	19.0	"Don't Look Back in Anger" — Oasis	24.59%	2	6	8	Safe
Sam & Alexandra	8.0	7.0	7.0	22.0	"Human" — The Killers	8.73%	4	2	6	Eliminated
Jorgie & Matt	8.5	9.0	9.0	26.5	"Bring Me to Life" — Evanescence	12.92%	7	5	12	Safe
Chico & Jodeyne	8.5	8.0	8.0	24.5	"Mony Mony" — Billy Idol	6.77%	5	1	6	Bottom two

Judges' votes to save

- Spence: Chico & Jodeyne
- Cousins: Chico & Jodeyne
- Witt: Chico & Jodeyne

=== Week 9 (4 March) ===
After their individual performances, the couples were divided into two teams for a group performance. The couples on the winning team, as determined by the judges, had their final scores doubled. Couples are listed in the order they performed.

- Team Jorgie (Jorgie & Matt; Chemmy & Sean; and Jennifer & Daniel): "Spice Up Your Life" – Spice Girls
- Team Matthew (Matthew & Nina; Andy & Vicky; and Chico & Jodeyne): "YMCA" – The Village People

Couple	Judges' scores			Total score	Team skate	Final score	Music	Public vote	Points			Result
Couple	Spence	Cousins	Witt	Total score	Team skate	Final score	Music	Public vote	Judges	Public	Total	Result
Jorgie & Matt	9.0	8.5	8.5	26.0	Won	52.0	"Crazy in Love" — Beyoncé, feat. Jay-Z	7.89%	6	2	8	Safe
Andy & Vicky	6.5	7.0	7.0	20.5	Lost	20.5	"Suspicious Minds" — Elvis Presley	14.85%	1	4	5	Eliminated
Chico & Jodeyne	8.5	8.0	8.5	25.0	Lost	25.0	"Sexy and I Know It" — LMFAO	16.44%	2	5	7	Safe
Chemmy & Sean	8.5	8.5	8.5	25.5	Won	51.0	"Next to Me" — Emeli Sandé	6.06%	5	1	6	Bottom two
Jennifer & Daniel	9.0	7.5	8.0	24.5	Won	49.0	"Happy" — Leona Lewis	9.58%	4	3	7	Safe
Matthew & Nina	9.5	9.5	9.5	28.5	Lost	28.5	"Dance with Me Tonight" — Olly Murs	45.18%	3	6	9	Safe

Judges' votes for team challenge

- Spence: Team Matthew
- Cousins: Team Jorgie
- Witt: Team Jorgie

Judges votes to save

- Spence: Chemmy & Sean
- Cousins: Chemmy & Sean
- Witt: Chemmy & Sean

=== Week 10 (11 March) ===
Theme: Prop Week at the Circus

Couples are listed in the order they performed.

Couple	Judges' scores			Total score	Music	Role in the circus	Public vote	Points			Result
Couple	Spence	Cousins	Witt	Total score	Music	Role in the circus	Public vote	Judges	Public	Total	Result
Chemmy & Sean	8.5	9.0	8.5	26.0	"Magic" — Pilot	Magician	9.98%	3	2	5	Eliminated
Chico & Jodeyne	9.0	9.0	9.0	27.0	"Stronger" — Kanye West	Strongman	9.23%	4	1	5	Bottom two
Jorgie & Matt	6.5	8.5	8.0	23.0	"Video Games" — Lana Del Rey	Ribbon dancer	41.82%	1	5	6	Safe
Matthew & Nina	9.5	9.5	9.0	28.0	"Real Wild Child" — Iggy Pop	Lion tamer	26.90%	5	4	9	Safe
Jennifer & Daniel	8.0	8.0	8.5	24.5	"You've Got a Friend in Me" — from Toy Story	Clown	12.07%	2	3	5	Safe

Judges' votes to save

- Witt: Chemmy & Sean
- Spence: Chico & Jodeyne
- Cousins: Chico & Jodeyne

=== Week 11 (18 March) ===
Required element: Solo challenge (Ultimate Skills Test)

Couples are listed in the order they performed.

Couple	Judges' scores			Total score	Music	Public vote	Points			Result
Couple	Spence	Cousins	Witt	Total score	Music	Public vote	Judges	Public	Total	Result
Chico & Jodeyne	9.5	9.5	9.5	55.5	"The Flood" — Take That	44.95%	3	3	6	Safe
Chico	9.0	9.0	9.0	55.5	"The Flood" — Take That	44.95%	3	3	6	Safe
Jennifer & Daniel	8.0	8.0	8.0	47.5	"I Wanna Dance with Somebody" — Whitney Houston	19.16%	1	1	2	Eliminated
Jennifer	7.5	8.0	8.0	47.5	"I Wanna Dance with Somebody" — Whitney Houston	19.16%	1	1	2	Eliminated
Jorgie & Matt	9.5	9.0	9.0	54.5	"Shake It Out" — Florence and the Machine	35.89%	2	2	4	Bottom two
Jorgie	9.0	9.0	9.0	54.5	"Shake It Out" — Florence and the Machine	35.89%	2	2	4	Bottom two
Matthew & Nina	9.0	9.0	9.5	56.0	"The Way You Make Me Feel" — Michael Jackson	—N/a				Immunity
Matthew	9.5	9.5	9.5	56.0	"The Way You Make Me Feel" — Michael Jackson	—N/a				Immunity

Judges' votes to save

- Spence: Jorgie & Matt
- Cousins: Jorgie & Matt
- Witt: Jorgie & Matt

=== Week 12: Finale (25 March) ===
Each couple performed two routines, one of which was their favourite routine of the series. One couple was eliminated and the final two couples performed the Boléro. Couples are listed in the order they performed.

Couple	Judges' scores			Total score	Music	Public vote	Boléro	Result
Couple	Spence	Cousins	Witt	Total score	Music	Public vote	Boléro	Result
Matthew & Nina	10.0	10.0	10.0	58.5	"Singin' in the Rain" — from Singin' in the Rain	60.69	74.45%	Winners
Matthew & Nina	9.5	9.5	9.5	58.5	"Don't Stop Me Now" — Queen	60.69	74.45%	Winners
Jorgie & Matt	10.0	9.5	9.5	59.0	"Fame" — from Fame	23.86	25.55%	Runners-up
Jorgie & Matt	10.0	10.0	10.0	59.0	"Fallin'" — Alicia Keys	23.86	25.55%	Runners-up
Chico & Jodeyne	8.5	8.5	9.0	56.0	"Happy Days" — from Happy Days	15.45	—N/a	Third place
Chico & Jodeyne	10.0	10.0	10.0	56.0	"Sexy and I Know It" — LMFAO	15.45	—N/a	Third place

== Ratings ==
Viewing figures from BARB.

Episode	Date	Total ITV viewers (millions)	Share
Live show 1	8 January	9.62	32.5%
Results 1	8 January	7.17	23.9%
Live show 2	15 January	8.47	28.8%
Results 2	15 January	6.92	23.5%
Live show 3	22 January	7.84	27.7%
Results 3	22 January	6.56	23.0%
Live show 4	29 January	8.35	28.0%
Results 4	29 January	6.54	22.2%
Live show 5	5 February	8.01	26.1%
Results 5	5 February	6.77	24.3%
Live show 6	12 February	7.73	26.1%
Results 6	12 February	6.45	21.7%
Live show 7	19 February	7.49	28.0%
Results 7	19 February	6.67	22.0%
Live show 8	26 February	8.08	27.8%
Results 8	26 February	6.44	22.1%
Live show 9	4 March	7.30	27.0%
Results 9	4 March	6.41	22.4%
Live show 10	11 March	8.06	27.4%
Results 10	11 March	6.79	23.4%
Live show 11	18 March	7.79	29.5%
Results 11	18 March	6.61	22.5%
Live final	25 March	7.90	30.1%
