= Level Up (British TV series) =

- Created by: BBC
- Developed by: Pete Davies
- Presented by: Sam Nixon; Mark Rhodes; Ayesha Asantewaa
- Country of origin: United Kingdom

Production
- Producer: Pete Davies
- Running time: 60 minutes

Original release
- Network: BBC
- Release: 3 April – 1 September 2006

Level Up is a UK children's TV programme that was broadcast on CBBC. It was launched on 3 April 2006, replacing Xchange. The show is an hour long and was broadcast during the school year, from 7:30am until 8:30am. During the school holidays, including Bank Holidays, the show aired from 9.30am until 10:30am.

The show was presented by Mark Rhodes and Sam Nixon who rose to fame after coming second and third, respectively, in the second series of Pop Idol. They were assisted by Ayesha Asantewaa, presenter of The Big Toe Radio Show, who read out the "Glitches and Fixes". It was transmitted live from studio TC10 at BBC Television Centre in London.

The first series completed its four-month run after it finished on 1 September 2006. A second series for 2007 was initially planned, although this eventually became Do Something Different.

Features
Feature	Description
Infoburst	where Sam and Mark researched the answer to questions sent in by viewers and answered them on the show.
The Techno Timeline	which took Sam and Mark back in time and explains about the technology of the time. There is also information about new technology that is likely to be seen in the future.
Have-a-go	A viewer sends in a short video about one of their skills (e.g. musical instrument, sport, etc.), and if chosen, is asked to come into the studio and let Sam and Mark have a go. The have-a-goer has to choose who was the best out of Sam or Mark and produces a small video of their tips and tricks for their skill which was then uploaded to the Level Up website. Sam was the overall winner.
60 Seconds of Newsround	CBBC's news programme was aired at around 7:15am and again at 7:45am during the show to keep viewers up-to-date on the latest news.
Instant Message	It's where a particular question was answered on the message board and some of the answers were read out on the show.
Billions Things	Short humorous video clips of ideas of what to do if you're bored.
R8 Your M8	Two friends or 'mates' are given the choice of several 'missions' to earn points. Six points won a V.I.P. visit to the Level Up studio. The missions included feeding a giraffe, cleaning up elephant faeces and running around with a silly costume on whilst dancing to music.
The Cheat Bros	Sam and Mark gives 'advice' on a particular subject, such as acting, moving to secondary school, football, etc.
Player 2 Ready	A feature of the show where a viewer sends in a video about their interest, such as a club, sport, etc.
The Next Level	The feature which allowed viewers interested in a certain job to enter into a competition, the winner of which is given the opportunity to work in a real-life environment, e.g. marine biology, sport commentary, etc.

The Next Level
Job	Child	Mentor	Boss
Fashion Designer	Imogen	Erica	Suet
Cook	Blessing		
Dog Trainer	Matthew	Nicky	Richard
Sports Commentator	Michael		Paul
Radio Journalist	Kate	Rose	Will
Games Demonstrator	Brendan	Callum	Tim
Archaeologist	Kareem	Andrew	Jim
Holiday Rep	Tom	Louise	Ashley
Film director	Grace		Tim
Marine Biologist	Mubeena	Janelle	Simon

== Experts ==
Sam and Mark were aided by young experts from a particular field. An integral part of the show, they occasionally presented a section of the programme live in the studio with Sam and Mark, explaining about how viewers could get involved, i.e. the environmental expert, Sarah , encouraged viewers to be more eco-friendly or Rishi, the technology expert, who informed viewers about the latest technological developments. The experts were:

Area	Expert
Technology	Rishi
Environment	Sarah Bowler
Fashion	Imogen
Film	Ollie
Sport	Stuart
Dance	Matthew Evan Garrett
Music	Jack
Books	Maxine Felicity Stride
Animals	Peter Cooper
Cooking	Blessing
Gardening	Emily
Pelvic Expert	Ian Hatchard
Science	Alex, Alex and Alex (Alex cubed)

Incidentally, two of the 'experts' have featured on the work experience part of the show, The Next Level.

== Gamers ==
On each programme, three of the twelve gamers were contacted at home via a webcam using Skype, although the connection was often temporarily lost. They joined in with the discussions, are set challenges, try to help out with the 'glitches and fixes', and make video diaries of special events/trips/holidays they go on.

The twelve gamers from the first series:

- Maria
- Avijit
- Callam
- Chloe
- Eleanor
- Lauren
- Rhys
- Naomi
- Ryan
- Alice
- Bradley
- Sam

Sam won the 12th Gamer competition.

=== The Gamer Weekender ===
The Gamer Weekender was a special weekend arranged by Level Up of fun and challenges and the chance for all the gamers to meet up. The weekender included several logic, team and competitive challenges with prizes at the end. For each team challenge they passed the gamers would receive two or three 'creds' (heavy weights) which they used to try to raise up a water level in a tall transparent cylinder. In the end, the gamers didn't quite raise the water level high enough but were given another chance and finally managed to raise the water level and win the prize of a ride in a limousine, a helicopter flight and a barbecue prepared by Sam & Mark.

== Glitches and fixes ==
=== Glitches and Fixes ===
Glitches and Fixes was the part of the show where Ayesha sorts through the 'glitches' and 'fixes'. 'Glitches' were problems which the viewers send in, either as a plain text message or a video.

'Fixes' were the other viewers suggestions to these problems which they phone, text or email in. The best were published on the programme's website for other viewers to vote on the top five.

=== Group glitches ===
Group glitches were glitches sent in by a group (e.g. friends, club, etc.) that would require more effort to fix than normal glitches. Group glitches were fixed by sending along a pro-gamer - someone who specialized in the field of the glitch - e.g. a girls football club sent in a group glitch and Level Up sent along one of the England's top women's football players to help them.

== See also ==
- Sam and Mark
