= Do Something Different =

- Also known as: DSD
- Created by: BBC
- Presented by: Sam Nixon; Mark Rhodes; Ayesha Asantewaa
- Country of origin: United Kingdom
- Original language: English

Production
- Running time: 45 minutes

Original release
- Network: BBC Two
- Release: 2 April – 4 September 2007

Do Something Different is a show produced and broadcast by CBBC. It was hosted by music duo Sam and Mark. The show aims to get one million children to try out new things; literally to "do something different", also referred in the programme as 'DSD-ing'. A child who completes a DSD is referred to as a 'DSDer'.

== Premise ==
The idea of the show is to get one million children to do something that they haven't previously tried, by the end of summer 2007. It doesn't matter what activity the viewer chooses to do, as long as it is something 'different' from their normal pastimes and activities. Ideas suggested by the presenters have been incredibly diverse and have included cooking a Spanish Omelette, learning to DJ, taking up a new sport, learning the ukulele, and (somewhat tongue-in cheek) the suggestion to "cross breed some lions and puffins" to make 'luffins'.

== Channel and timeslot ==
The 'first run' of the series was transmitted during the UK schools' Easter holidays on BBC Two, as well as on the CBBC Channel. This initial run comprised ten 45 minute episodes. Each episode was first shown at 8 a.m. on BBC Two, with a different episode being shown for each of the ten weekdays of the Easter holidays.

The 'second run' of the show began transmission during the UK schools' summer holidays, in the same timeslot. Although it started one week earlier in the time slot 7:15am–8:00am on BBC Two.

== Format ==
Each of the Easter and Summer shows contained different 'strands' -

- DSD Challenge
- My DSD – A different person every time telling you about the hobby they do and how to do it and where you can do it and when you can do it.
- Sam Challenge / Mark Challenge
- Boys vs Girls
- Links

Each episode was recorded in a different location within the UK. In the links presenters Sam and Mark would try out a DSD, such as swimming with sharks, trying out the infamous 'cola and mentos' experiment, pigeon racing or racing cars at Silverstone.

The DSD Challenges were 18 minute films, divided into three sections. All three parts to a challenge were shown within one episode of the programme. The films followed the journey of a different viewer each episode, who had been challenged to do a specific DSD activity – for example, one child who was a hip-hop street dancer learned to be a ballroom dancer, and took part in a national competition. Some of the children used in the Easter shows were previously 'gamers' on the shows predecessor, Level Up.

The Sam and Mark Challenge films were similar to the DSD challenges, but they followed the progress of the two presenters being challenged to DSD. These had five parts, with one part from one of the challenges being shown in each episode of the programme. Sam's challenge was to train to become a stuntman in the US, and take part in a stunt-show. Mark's challenge was to learn hip-hop dancing, and take part in a one on one battle at the UK Hip Hop Dance Championships.

The Boys vs Girls segments of the show were presented by Ayesha. In these segments, a group of three boys and a group of three girls would learn a new activity. They would receive training in this activity from a child mentor who had excelled in that field. The activities included golf, pottery, indoor skydiving and playing the xylophone. Once they had received training, the boys and girls would compete against each other. After each team had a go at the activity, the mentor judged which group performed better. A different group of children was featured for each episode. Overall, the girls won during the Easter run, beating the boys 6–4.

== Website ==
The show is heavily dependent upon the website which accompanies the series. The website is divided into a number of sections, including 'How you can DSD', 'Pledge a DSD', and 'Ayesha's Stats'.

In the 'Plegde a DSD' section, viewers can suggest 'DSDs' for users to try out, and pledge to do the suggestions. Once a DSD has been pledged, the user can then mark it as completed, once they have tried the activity. Each child who registers on the website adds to the growing total, with the ultimate goal of reaching one million DSDs.

The 'Ayesha's Stats' area contains statistics such as the number of DSDs that have been completed, the regions of the UK that have the most DSDers, the most pledged and most popular DSDs.
