= Hole in the Wall (British game show) =

British game show

- Genre: Game show
- Presented by: Dale Winton; Anton du Beke
- Starring: Anton du Beke; Darren Gough; Austin Healey; Joe Swash
- Voices of: Peter Dickson
- Narrated by: Jonathan Pearce
- Theme music composer: Simon Darlow
- Country of origin: United Kingdom
- Original language: English
- No. of series: 2
- No. of episodes: 21 (1 unaired)

Production
- Executive producers: Claire Horton (2008); Suzy Lamb (2009)
- Running time: 30 minutes per episode (approx.)
- Production companies: Talkback Thames; BBC Scotland (2009)

Original release
- Network: BBC One
- Release: 20 September 2008 – 12 December 2009

Related
- Brain Wall

Hole in the Wall is a British game show that aired on BBC One in the United Kingdom. It also occasionally aired repeats of this show on CBBC until April 2014. This game was an adaptation of the Japanese game Brain Wall (also known as "Human Tetris") in which players must contort themselves to fit through cutout holes of varying shapes in a large polystyrene wall moving towards them as they stand in front of a swimming pool. Each week, two teams of television personalities competed for £10,000 in prize money to be donated to their chosen charity.

Dale Winton served as the original host while Strictly Come Dancing ballroom dancer Anton du Beke and former international cricketer Darren Gough were the team captains for the first series. Additionally, Jonathan Pearce commented on the replays and Peter Dickson provided the opening voice-over. The wall was activated by the presenter shouting Bring on the wall!

On 3 July 2008, the BBC announced that the show had been commissioned for BBC One. A second series was confirmed, with Anton du Beke giving up his captain role to take over from Dale Winton as host and new team captains in the shape of former rugby player Austin Healey and actor Joe Swash with Jonathan Pearce now doing an opening voice-over plus replay commentary.

A pilot episode for a revival was filmed in 2025, with Alison Hammond (who was a contestant in the first series) hosting, but was not picked up.

== Format ==
The game was split into four rounds as well as the final "Great Wall" (known as "Mega Wall" in the first series).

The first round was "Solo Wall" which saw each team's two guest players take a turn to face a wall just on their own. For each wall, 10 points were given to the player for a pass while a fail could be given up to 5 points depending on the host's whim.

Next was the "Captain's Challenge" or "Captain's Mate" which could be one of a number of games:

- Doubles – The captain and a chosen teammate of his choosing (usually, the one they are encouraged to do so by the studio audience) both attempt a wall. A maximum of 20 points was on offer.
- Props – The captain must complete the wall with a prop. This round made its first appearance when Anton Du Beke successfully cleared a wall on a space hopper.
- Mirror Wall – The captain must attempt a wall backwards (facing the swimming pool) leaving his two teammates communicate to him about the shape he needs to make.
- Blind Wall – The captain is blindfolded and his team members have to instruct to him the shape he needs to make.

The third round was "Mystery Guest or Killer Question", the team leading being offered the choice of which game they wished to play and the currently losing team playing the other challenge. A maximum of 20 points was on offer.

- Killer Question – Two players face a wall without cut-outs with a question written at the top and two answers marked as doors. The "door" with the correct answer on it is perforated on the reverse side and so gives way. The players must pass through the correct door.
- Mystery Guest – One of the team attempts a wall with a mystery guest (or several).

The fourth round was the "Team Wall". All three players face the wall with a maximum of 30 points on offer.

The programme's finale was the "Mega Wall". The leading team got to choose to attempt the wall or nominate the opposition. All three players on the team attempt the wall, which travels at double speed – if they clear the wall, they win the show (and the £10,000 to donate to a charity of their choice), while if they fail, the opposing team wins the £10,000.

Hole in the Wall used a specialised crane made by Street Crane Company of Chapel-en-le-Frith to move the wall.

=== Series 2 changes ===
Series 2, which started on 26 September 2009, contains all new challenges. Solo Wall now only featured one guest attempting a wall instead of two. The Captain's Challenge was replaced with Captain's Mate in which the teammate who did not attempt solo wall stands in the play area with his or her captain (sometimes one person is blindfolded). Team Wall returned. Killer Question was now named Wonder Wall (with both teams now playing it as opposed to just one team). A new challenge named Anton's Twist debuted. Which followed some of the following twists:

- 3 Monkeys (One won't be able to hear, one won't be able to see, one won't be able to speak)
- All team members (In Episode 5, It Was 2) joined together
- Head to Head
- Mimic team member
- No Hole Wall (The shape will be on the screen on top of the wall, the player will try to match this shape)
- Pelting with dodgeballs from the other team
- Mystery Guest
- Jigsaw Wall
- Mirror the audience
- Balloons
- Props
- Building Blocks

The Mega Wall was renamed the Great Wall.

Anton's Twist, according to Anton, involved walls he'd invented with a twist. Variations could be any number players with various twists (such as placing leg braces around the legs of team members commonly used in three-legged races), or the appearance of a mystery guest. Notably, one episode had Anton announce a mystery guest for Joe Swash's team, and Joe asked, "Is it my mum?" It turned out it was his mother, but the two failed the wall (although they still scored points for the team).

== Production ==
Series 1 was recorded at BBC Television Centre in White City, West London, with series 2 seeing the show relocating to BBC Pacific Quay in Glasgow as part of an out-of-London production plan. For series 2, the show was also shot in high-definition.

The first series had the entire audience off to the left side (from the perspective of the cameras looking straight at the wall), with the team benches on the other side, and the scoreboards by each bench. Winton, Du Beke, and Gough (as well as their teammates) would emerge from the left side when introduced, while the mystery guest(s) emerged from a platform below stage that rose to the top when introduced. For the second series, the audience was placed on three sides of the set, and the scoreboards were placed on the floor, hence Anton's catchphrase: "The scores on the floor are..." Du Beke would enter from a ballroom dancer wall and slides were used by Healy, Swash, their Teammates, and the two mystery guests who appeared (Erin Boag and Kiffy Swash).

== Episode guide ==
– Won by red team (Anton Du Beke/Joe Swash)
– Won by blue team (Darren Gough/Austin Healey)

=== Series 1 (2008) ===
Episode	Original airdate	Anton's team	Mystery guest(s)	Points	Darren's team	Mystery guest(s)	Points	Mega wall
1	20 September 2008	Dave Myers; Zoe Salmon	-	49	Andi Peters; Sherrie Hewson	Dancing Dollies	39	Anton's team clear
2	27 September 2008	Vic Reeves; Vanessa Feltz	The Cheeky Girls	27	Nancy Sorrell; DJ Spoony	-	22	Darren's team fail
3	4 October 2008	Phil Tufnell; Nell McAndrew	Glenn Ross	43	Iwan Thomas; Josie D'Arby	-	42	Anton's team fail
4	11 October 2008	Amy Lamé; Sam Nixon	Nouska Hanly	40	Siân Lloyd; Mark Rhodes	-	43	Anton's team clear
5	18 October 2008	Marcus Brigstocke; Sarah Cawood	Neil Fingleton	36	Bobby Davro; Michelle Heaton (Note: Heaton managed to remain dry by not failing a task but this resulted in teammates Darren Gough and Bobby Davro pushing her into the water.)	-	43	Darren's team clear
6	25 October 2008	Vanessa Feltz; Joe Swash	-	39	Alex Wotherspoon; Angellica Bell	Pat Warner	62	Anton's team fail
7	1 November 2008	Phil Tufnell; Nancy Lam	-	49	Carrie Grant; Tony Marshall	Brian Big	54	Anton's team clear
8	8 November 2008	Christine Hamilton; Martin Offiah	-	47	Neil Hamilton; Lady Isabella Hervey	Ross Brewer	37	Anton's team clear
9	15 November 2008	Jennie Bond; Rav Wilding	-	32	David Spinx; Emma Rigby	-	33	Darren's team clear
10	22 November 2008	Ninia Benjamin; Dominic Littlewood	-	39 (Note: Anton's team were docked two points for cheating (shouting an incorrect call) during Darren's Captains Challenge (Darren being blind folded).)	Cleo Rocos; Scott Mills	London Wasps	38	Anton's team fail
11	20 December 2008	Best of Series 1 Retrospective						

=== Series 2 (2009) ===
Episode	Original airdate	Joe's team	Points	Anton's Twist	Austin's team	Points	Anton's Twist	Great wall
1	26 September 2009	Comedy Dave; Anne Diamond	35	3 Monkeys	Sophie Anderton; John Altman	50	Joined Together	Austin's team fail
2	3 October 2009	Kristian Digby; Alison Hammond	65	Head To Head (Jigsaw/Mirrored)	Gemma Merna; Graham Cole	27 (Note: Joe's team won by disqualification on the Great Wall because Austin's team ignored two usable holes, Gemma stepped out of the play area, and Graham damaged the Great Wall. By rule you cannot damage the Great Wall.)	Head To Head (Jigsaw/Mirrored)	Austin's team disqualified
3	10 October 2009	Lil' Chris; Kelly Dalglish	27	Balloon	Matthew Chambers; Gemma Bissix	44	Building Block	Austin's team clear
4	24 October 2009	Ian "H" Watkins; Linda Lusardi	80 (Note: Joe's team were docked ten points because Joe attempted to push Ricky Groves into the water as Ricky was struggling to stay on his feet after going through Team Wall.)	Dodgeball	Ricky Groves; Abi Titmuss	65	No Hole Wall	Joe's team fail
5	31 October 2009	Ninia Benjamin; Rufus Hound	48	Prop	Dennis Taylor; Jessica Taylor	82	Joined Together (2 Players)	Joe's team fail
6	Unaired until 2017 (Note: Due to the Royal British Legion Festival of Remembrance, Episode 6 was not broadcast originally. The episode eventually aired 8 years later on Challenge in 2017. When it aired, it emerged that one of the questions in the Wonder Wall round was related to how many members were in the boyband Boyzone that was inadvertently incorrect; the episode had been recorded before Stephen Gately passed away.)	Danielle Lloyd; Mark Foster	58	3 Monkeys	Debbie McGee; Ben James-Ellis	34	Joined Together	Austin's team fail
7	14 November 2009	Annabel Croft; Sam Nixon	70	Dodgeball	Beth Tweddle; Mark Rhodes	69 (Note: Austin bounced a ball on Anton's head, and then, he admitted it was meant to bounce on Joe's head, which because of that, 1 point was deducted.)	Mystery Guest (Erin Boag)	Joe's team fail
8	21 November 2009	Kate Lawler; Jonathan Ansell	45	Balloon	John Partridge; Siân Reeves	85 (Note: Austin's team were docked 10 points because Austin pushed Jonathan into the pool when he was helping Kate and Joe go through Wonder Wall.)	3 Monkeys	Austin's team fail
9	28 November 2009	Zaraah Abrahams; Simon Rimmer	45	Mystery Guest (Joe's mum Kiffy Swash)	Toyah Willcox; Barney Harwood	77	Mirrored	Austin's team clear
10	5 December 2009	Martin Roberts; Verity Rushworth	39	No Hole Wall	Ben Clarke; Caprice	85	Prop	Austin's team fail
11	12 December 2009	Best of Series 2 Retrospective						

== Transmissions ==
Series	Start date	End date	Episodes
1	20 September 2008	20 December 2008	11
2	26 September 2009	12 December 2009	11
