= Dancing on Ice series 8 =

Eighth series of Dancing on Ice

Dancing on Ice
- Series 8
- Presented by: Phillip Schofield; Christine Bleakley
- Judges: Karen Barber; Robin Cousins; Jason Gardiner; Ashley Roberts
- Celebrity winner: Beth Tweddle
- Professional winner: Daniel Whiston
- No. of episodes: 19

Release
- Original network: ITV
- Original release: 6 January – 10 March 2013

Series chronology
- ← Previous; Series 7 Next → Series 9

The eighth series of Dancing on Ice aired from on 6 January to 10 March 2013, on ITV. Phillip Schofield and Christine Bleakley returned as hosts, with Jayne Torvill and Christopher Dean serving as mentors. The series was judged by Robin Cousins, Karen Barber, Ashley Roberts, and Jason Gardiner. Gardiner had departed after series 6 in 2011, but returned to replace Louie Spence, while Ashley Roberts joined the Ice Panel as Katarina Witt's replacement. Barber rejoined the Ice Panel after serving as head coach in series 6 and series 7.

Gymnast Beth Tweddle and her partner Daniel Whiston won the series on 10 March 2013, with Matt Lapinskas and Brianne Delcourt finishing as runners-up, and boxer Luke Campbell and Jenna Smith placing 3rd. As of 2026, Tweddle is the latest female celebrity to win the show, as no female celebrity has won since the show's revival in 2018.

== Couples ==
The line-up was officially announced on 18 December 2012.

Celebrity	Notability	Professional partner	Status
Pamela Anderson	Actress & Playboy model	Matt Evers	Eliminated 1st on 6 January 2013
Lauren Goodger	The Only Way Is Essex star	Michael Zenezini	Eliminated 2nd on 13 January 2013
Oona King	Labour Party politician	Mark Hanretty	Eliminated 3rd on 20 January 2013
Anthea Turner	Television presenter	Andy Buchanan	Eliminated 4th on 27 January 2013
Shayne Ward	Singer & The X Factor winner	Maria Filippov	Eliminated 5th on 3 February 2013
Joe Pasquale	Comedian	Vicky Ogden	Eliminated 6th on 10 February 2013
Keith Chegwin	Television presenter & actor	Olga Sharutenko	Eliminated 7th on 17 February 2013
Samia Ghadie	Coronation Street actress	Sylvain Longchambon	Eliminated 8th on 24 February 2013
Gareth Thomas	Wales rugby player	Robin Johnstone	Withdrew on 3 March 2013
Luke Campbell	Olympic boxer	Jenna Smith	Third place on 10 March 2013
Matt Lapinskas	EastEnders actor	Brianne Delcourt	Runners-up on 10 March 2013
Beth Tweddle	Olympic artistic gymnast	Daniel Whiston	Winners on 10 March 2013

== Scoring chart ==
The highest score each week is indicated in bold green with a dagger (†), while the lowest score each week is indicated in italicized red with a double-dagger (‡).

Color key:

Winners
Runners-up
Third place
Bottom two
Withdrew from competition
Eliminated

Dancing on Ice (series 8) - Weekly scores
Couple	Pl.	Week									
Couple	Pl.	1	2	3 (Note: This week featured celebrity duels. Couples were paired up to compete head-to-head, and the judges determined which of the two couples from each pairing won. That couple received immunity from elimination.)	4	5	6	7 (Note: This week featured team performances. The couples on the winning team had their scores doubled for the night.)	8	9	10
Beth & Dan	1st	21.0	—N/a	Won	23.0	**30.5**†	29.5	30.5	30.0	33.5+38.0=71.5	36.5+37.5=74.0 (Note: This couple finished in first place.)
Matt & Brianne	2nd	**24.0**†	—N/a	Won	**25.5**†	28.0 (Note: This couple was in the bottom two, but was not eliminated.)	28.5	35.5×2=**71.0**†	**36.0**	39.0+39.0=**78.0**†	40.0+40.0=**80.0**† (Note: This couple finished in second place.)
Luke & Jenna	3rd	—N/a	18.5	Lost	20.0	23.5	24.0	24.5×2=49.0	30.0	30.5+31.5=63.0	34.5+32.5=67.0‡ (Note: This couple finished in third place.)
Gareth & Robin	4th	—N/a	**22.5**†	Lost	23.0	27.5	**30.0**†	29.5×2=59.0	34.5	33.5 (Note: This couple withdrew from the competition.)	
Samia & Sylvain	5th	17.5	—N/a	Won	23.5	18.0‡	22.0	27.0	28.0‡ (Note: This couple was eliminated.)		
Keith & Olga	6th	15.5‡	—N/a	Won	21.5	21.0	22.0	25.0‡			
Joe & Vicky	7th	—N/a	14.0‡	Lost	16.0‡	18.0‡	18.5‡				
Shayne & Maria	8th	16.0	—N/a	Lost	20.0	23.5					
Anthea & Andy	9th	—N/a	18.0	Won	18.5						
Oona & Mark	10th	—N/a	20.5	Lost							
Lauren & Michael	11th	—N/a	15.0								
Pamela & Matt	12th	18.5									

== Weekly scores ==
=== Week 1 (6 January) ===
Group performance: "Spectrum (Say My Name)" — Florence and the Machine

Only half of the celebrities performed this week. Couples are listed in the order they performed.

Couple	Judges' scores				Total score	Music	Public vote	Points			Result
Couple	Cousins	Barber	Roberts	Gardiner	Total score	Music	Public vote	Judges	Public	Total	Result
Samia & Sylvain	4.5	5.5	4.0	3.5	17.5	"Diamonds" — Rihanna	25.93%	3	6	9	Safe
Keith & Olga	4.0	4.5	4.0	3.0	15.5	"Things Can Only Get Better" — D:Ream	12.49%	1	3	4	Bottom two
Beth & Dan	6.5	6.5	4.5	3.5	21.0	"Anything Could Happen" — Ellie Goulding	19.85%	5	4	9	Safe
Matt & Brianne	7.0	7.0	5.0	5.0	24.0	"Turn Up the Music" — Chris Brown	9.41%	6	2	8	Safe
Shayne & Maria	4.0	4.5	4.0	3.5	16.0	"Too Close" — Alex Clare	24.33%	2	5	7	Safe
Pamela & Matt	5.0	6.0	4.0	3.5	18.5	"Read All About It" — Emeli Sandé	7.99%	4	1	5	Eliminated

Save Me skates

- Keith & Olga: "O Fortuna" — Carl Orff
- Pamela & Matt: "Sacrifice" — Sinéad O'Connor

Judges' votes to save

- Barber: Keith & Olga
- Roberts: Keith & Olga
- Gardiner: Keith & Olga
- Cousins: Keith & Olga

=== Week 2 (13 January) ===
Group performance: "All About Tonight" — Pixie Lott

Only half of the celebrities performed this week. Couples are listed in the order they performed.

Couple	Judges' scores				Total score	Music	Public vote	Points			Result
Couple	Cousins	Barber	Roberts	Gardiner	Total score	Music	Public vote	Judges	Public	Total	Result
Gareth & Robin	7.0	7.0	4.5	4.0	22.5	"All These Things That I've Done" — The Killers	12.61%	6	4	10	Safe
Lauren & Michael	4.0	4.0	4.0	3.0	15.0	"Girl on Fire" — Alicia Keys	10.15%	2	3	5	Eliminated
Joe & Vicky	3.0	4.0	5.0	2.0	14.0	"Flash" — Queen	32.33%	1	6	7	Safe
Oona & Mark	6.0	6.0	5.0	3.5	20.5	"No More Tears" — Donna Summer & Barbra Streisand	8.58%	5	1	6	Safe
Luke & Jenna	5.5	5.5	4.0	3.5	18.5	"Gold Forever" — The Wanted	26.55%	4	5	9	Safe
Anthea & Andy	4.5	4.5	4.5	4.5	18.0	"Skyfall" — Adele	9.78%	3	2	5	Bottom two

Save Me skates

- Lauren & Michael: "Rescue Me" — Fontella Bass
- Anthea & Andy: "Lovin' You" — Minnie Riperton

Judges' votes to save

- Barber: Anthea & Andy
- Roberts: Anthea & Andy
- Gardiner: Anthea & Andy
- Cousins: Anthea & Andy

=== Week 3 (20 January) ===
Group performance: "Standing in the Way of Control" — The Gossip

Tonight featured partner "duels". Two couples skated simultaneously to the same song, and the judges chose the couple who they thought skated the best to receive immunity for the week. The public then voted among the remaining five couples. Dueling pairs are listed in the order they performed.

Couple	Judges' scores				Music	Public vote	Points	Result
Couple	Cousins	Barber	Roberts	Gardiner	Music	Public vote	Points	Result
Matt & Brianne	Yes	Yes	Yes	Yes	"The Devil Went Down to Georgia" — Charlie Daniels Band	Immunity		
Gareth & Robin	No	No	No	No	"The Devil Went Down to Georgia" — Charlie Daniels Band	18.14%	2	Bottom two
Samia & Sylvain	Yes	Yes	Yes	Yes	"This Is Love" — will.i.am, feat. Eva Simons	Immunity		
Luke & Jenna	No	No	No	No	"This Is Love" — will.i.am, feat. Eva Simons	22.28%	3	Safe
Beth & Dan	Yes	Yes	Yes	Yes	"Sisters Are Doin' It for Themselves" — Eurythmics & Aretha Franklin	Immunity		
Oona & Mark	No	No	No	No	"Sisters Are Doin' It for Themselves" — Eurythmics & Aretha Franklin	4.36%	1	Eliminated
Anthea & Andy	Yes	Yes	Yes	Yes	"Broken Strings" — James Morrison & Nelly Furtado	Immunity		
Shayne & Maria	No	No	No	No	"Broken Strings" — James Morrison & Nelly Furtado	25.39%	4	Safe
Keith & Olga	Yes	Yes	Yes	Yes	"Soul Man" — Sam & Dave	Immunity		
Joe & Vicky	No	No	No	No	"Soul Man" — Sam & Dave	29.82%	5	Safe

Save Me skates

- Gareth & Robin: "Somebody to Love" — Queen
- Oona & Mark: "Just the Two of Us" — Bill Withers

Judges' votes to save

- Barber: Gareth & Robin
- Roberts: Oona & Mark
- Gardiner: Gareth & Robin
- Cousins: Gareth & Robin

=== Week 4 (27 January) ===
Theme: School Disco
Group performance: "Kidz" — Take That

Couples are listed in the order they performed.

Couple	Judges' scores				Total score	Music	Public vote	Points			Result
Couple	Cousins	Barber	Roberts	Gardiner	Total score	Music	Public vote	Judges	Public	Total	Result
Shayne & Maria	5.0	5.5	5.5	4.0	20.0	"Livin' la Vida Loca" — Ricky Martin	11.65%	5	4	9	Safe
Luke & Jenna	5.5	6.0	4.5	4.0	20.0	"When the Going Gets Tough" — Boyzone	12.34%	5	6	11	Safe
Anthea & Andy	4.5	5.0	5.0	4.0	18.5	"Puppy Love" — Donny Osmond	3.35%	4	1	5	Eliminated
Keith & Olga	5.5	6.0	5.5	4.5	21.5	"I'll Be There" — The Jackson 5	8.11%	6	3	9	Bottom two
Gareth & Robin	6.0	6.5	5.5	5.0	23.0	"When Will I Be Famous?" — Bros	11.70%	7	5	12	Safe
Matt & Brianne	7.0	7.0	6.5	5.0	25.5	"Slam Dunk (Da Funk)" — 5ive	3.90%	9	2	11	Safe
Beth & Dan	6.5	6.5	5.5	4.5	23.0	"5,6,7,8" — Steps	16.02%	7	8	15	Safe
Joe & Vicky	3.5	5.0	4.0	3.5	16.0	"The Things We Do for Love" — 10cc	15.12%	3	7	10	Safe
Samia & Sylvain	6.0	6.0	6.0	5.5	23.5	"Wannabe" — Spice Girls	17.81%	8	9	17	Safe

Save Me skates

- Anthea & Andy: "Feeling Good" — Michael Bublé
- Keith & Olga: "Disturbia" — Rihanna

Judges' votes to save

- Barber: Keith & Olga
- Roberts: Anthea & Andy
- Gardiner: Keith & Olga
- Cousins: Keith & Olga

=== Week 5 (3 February) ===
Theme: The Leveller — Each celebrity was required to perform a 30-second solo skate in their routine.
Group performance: "Hot Right Now" — Rita Ora
Torvill & Dean performance: "Better Together" — Jack Johnson

Couples are listed in the order they performed.

Couple	Judges' scores				Total score	Music	Public vote	Points			Result
Couple	Cousins	Barber	Roberts	Gardiner	Total score	Music	Public vote	Judges	Public	Total	Result
Samia & Sylvain	4.5	5.0	4.5	4.0	18.0	"Wings" — Little Mix	18.71%	3	7	10	Safe
Keith & Olga	5.5	6.0	5.0	4.5	21.0	"Hernando's Hideaway" — The Johnston Brothers	15.50%	4	6	10	Safe
Shayne & Maria	6.0	6.5	6.0	5.0	23.5	"Mama Told Me Not to Come" — Tom Jones & Stereophonics	8.38%	5	2	7	Eliminated
Matt & Brianne	7.0	7.5	7.0	6.5	28.0	"Night on Bald Mountain" — Modest Mussorgsky	4.53%	7	1	8	Bottom two
Luke & Jenna	6.5	6.5	5.5	5.0	23.5	"Little Things" — One Direction	10.30%	5	3	8	Safe
Gareth & Robin	7.5	7.0	6.5	6.5	27.5	"The Best Is Yet to Come" — Michael Bublé	10.85%	6	4	10	Safe
Beth & Dan	8.0	8.0	7.0	7.5	30.5	"Clown" — Emeli Sandé	18.75%	8	8	16	Safe
Joe & Vicky	4.5	5.0	5.0	3.5	18.0	"Hippy Hippy Shake" — The Swinging Blue Jeans	12.99%	3	5	8	Safe

Save Me skates

- Shayne & Maria: "Sweet Disposition" — The Temper Trap
- Matt & Brianne: "Talking to the Moon" — Bruno Mars

Judges' votes to save

- Barber: Matt & Brianne
- Roberts: Matt & Brianne
- Gardiner: Shayne & Maria
- Cousins: Matt & Brianne

=== Week 6 (10 February) ===
Theme: Love Week
Group performance: "Love Is in the Air" — John Paul Young

Couple	Judges' scores				Total score	Music	Public vote	Points			Result
Couple	Cousins	Barber	Roberts	Gardiner	Total score	Music	Public vote	Judges	Public	Total	Result
Gareth & Robin	8.0	8.5	7.0	6.5	30.0	"Beneath Your Beautiful" — Labrinth feat. Emeli Sandé	14.87%	7	6	13	Safe
Joe & Vicky	5.0	5.0	4.5	4.0	18.5	"Tiptoe Through the Tulips" — Michael Holliday	9.21%	2	1	3	Eliminated
Matt & Brianne	7.0	7.5	7.0	7.0	28.5	"Ho Hey" — The Lumineers	13.69%	5	4	9	Safe
Samia & Sylvain	5.5	5.5	5.5	5.5	22.0	"I Will Always Love You" — Whitney Houston	14.47%	3	5	8	Safe
Luke & Jenna	6.0	6.5	6.0	5.5	24.0	"Everyday" — Buddy Holly	9.32%	4	3	7	Safe
Keith & Olga	5.5	6.0	5.5	5.0	22.0	"All About You" — McFly	9.25%	3	2	5	Bottom two
Beth & Dan	8.0	8.0	6.5	7.0	29.5	"We Found Love" — Rihanna	29.18%	6	7	13	Safe

Save Me skates

- Joe & Vicky: "I Started a Joke" — Robin Gibb
- Keith & Olga: "One Day Like This" — Elbow

Judges' votes to save

- Barber: Keith & Olga
- Roberts: Keith & Olga
- Gardiner: Keith & Olga
- Cousins: Keith & Olga

=== Week 7 (17 February) ===
After their individual performances, the couples were divided into two teams for a group performance. The couples on the winning team, as determined by the judges, had their final scores doubled. Couples are listed in the order they performed.

- Team Matt (Matt & Brianne; Luke & Jenna; and Gareth & Robin): "U Can't Touch This" — MC Hammer
- Team Beth (Beth & Dan; Samia & Sylvain; and Keith & Olga): "Gangnam Style" — Psy

Couple	Judges' scores				Total score	Team skate	Final score	Music	Public vote	Points			Result
Couple	Cousins	Barber	Roberts	Gardiner	Total score	Team skate	Final score	Music	Public vote	Judges	Public	Total	Result
Keith & Olga	6.0	6.0	6.5	6.5	25.0	Lost	25.0	"20th Century Boy" — T. Rex	21.82%	1	5	6	Eliminated
Luke & Jenna	6.5	6.5	6.0	5.5	24.5	Won	49.0	"Drive By" — Train	9.61%	4	3	7	Safe
Beth & Dan	8.0	8.0	8.0	6.5	30.5	Lost	30.5	"That Man" — Caro Emerald	34.08%	3	6	9	Safe
Matt & Brianne	9.0	9.0	9.0	8.5	35.5	Won	71.0	"A Change Is Gonna Come" — Seal	8.38%	6	1	7	Safe
Gareth & Robin	7.5	7.5	7.5	7.0	29.5	Won	59.0	"Turn Around" — Conor Maynard ft. Ne-Yo	9.01%	5	2	7	Safe
Samia & Sylvain	6.5	7.0	7.0	6.5	27.0	Lost	27.0	"Barbie Girl" — Aqua	17.10%	2	4	6	Bottom two

Judges' votes for Team challenge

- Barber: Team Matt
- Roberts: Team Matt
- Gardiner: Team Beth
- Cousins: Team Matt

Save Me skates

- Keith & Olga: "O Fortuna" — Carl Orff
- Samia & Sylvain: "Should I Stay or Should I Go" — The Clash

Judges' votes to save

- Barber: Samia & Sylvain
- Roberts: Samia & Sylvain
- Gardiner: Keith & Olga
- Cousins: Samia & Sylvain

=== Week 8 (24 February) ===
Theme: Prop Week
Group performance: "Galvanize" — The Chemical Brothers
Torvill & Dean performance: "Accentuate the Positive" (performed by Jools Holland's Rhythm and Blues Orchestra & Rumer)

Couple	Judges' scores				Total score	Music	Prop	Public vote	Points			Result
Couple	Cousins	Barber	Roberts	Gardiner	Total score	Music	Prop	Public vote	Judges	Public	Total	Result
Beth & Dan	7.5	8.0	7.5	7.0	30.0	"Born This Way" — Lady Gaga	Hula hoop	34.75%	3	5	8	Safe
Luke & Jenna	8.0	7.5	7.0	7.5	30.0	"Sweat" — David Guetta vs. Snoop Dogg	Skipping rope	12.05%	3	2	5	Bottom two
Matt & Brianne	9.0	9.0	9.0	9.0	36.0	"I Need a Dollar" — Aloe Blacc, "The Entertainer" — Scott Joplin & "In the Navy" — The Village People	Hats	11.25%	5	1	6	Safe
Samia & Sylvain	7.0	7.0	7.0	7.0	28.0	"The Look" — Roxette	Hairdresser chair	18.45%	2	3	5	Eliminated
Gareth & Robin	9.0	8.5	8.0	9.0	34.5	"Hall of Fame" — The Script, feat. will.i.am	Rugby ball	23.50%	4	4	8	Safe

Save Me skates

- Luke and Jenna: "Don't You Worry Child" — Swedish House Mafia
- Samia and Sylvain: "Bailamos" — Enrique Iglesias

Judges' votes to save

- Barber: Luke & Jenna
- Roberts: Luke & Jenna
- Gardiner: Luke & Jenna
- Cousins: Luke & Jenna

=== Week 9: Semifinals (3 March) ===
Theme: Flying
Group performance: "Titanium" — David Guetta, feat. Sia
Torvill & Dean performance: "Never Tear Us Apart"

Gareth Thomas was forced to withdraw from the competition after his first performance for medical reasons. As a result, the other three couples automatically advanced to the finals, although they did perform their skate-off routines in exhibition.

Couple	Judges' scores				Total score	Music	Public vote	Points			Result
Couple	Cousins	Barber	Roberts	Gardiner	Total score	Music	Public vote	Judges	Public	Total	Result
Matt & Brianne	10.0	10.0	10.0	9.0	78.0	"Straighten Up and Fly Right" — Robbie Williams	9.89%	4	2	6	Safe
Matt & Brianne	9.5	9.5	10.0	10.0	78.0	"Bad" — Michael Jackson	9.89%	4	2	6	Safe
Beth & Dan	9.0	8.5	8.0	8.0	71.5	"Domino" — Jessie J	49.29%	3	4	7	Safe
Beth & Dan	10.0	9.5	9.5	9.0	71.5	"Angel" — Sarah McLachlan	49.29%	3	4	7	Safe
Luke & Jenna	8.0	8.0	8.0	6.5	62.0	"Higher Love" — James Vincent McMorrow	9.47%	2	1	3	Safe
Luke & Jenna	8.0	8.5	7.5	7.5	62.0	"What About Now" — Westlife	9.47%	2	1	3	Safe
Gareth & Robin	8.5	8.5	8.5	8.0	33.5	"Viva la Vida" — Coldplay	31.35%	1	3	4	Withdrew

Save Me skates

- Matt and Brianne: "Iris" — Goo Goo Dolls
- Beth and Dan: "Live and Let Die" — Paul McCartney
- Luke and Jenna: "Hometown Glory" — Adele

=== Week 10: Finale (10 March) ===
Torvill & Dean performance: "Boléro"

Couple	Judges' scores				Total score	Music	Public vote	Boléro	Result
Couple	Cousins	Barber	Roberts	Gardiner	Total score	Music	Public vote	Boléro	Result
Beth & Dan	9.0	9.0	9.0	9.5	74.0	"Car Wash" — Rose Royce	64.14%	74.99%	Winners
Beth & Dan	9.0	9.5	9.5	9.5	74.0	"Clown" — Emeli Sandé	64.14%	74.99%	Winners
Luke & Jenna	8.5	8.5	9.0	8.5	67.0	"Crazy Little Thing Called Love" — Dwight Yoakam	9.72%	—N/a	Third place
Luke & Jenna	8.0	8.0	8.5	8.0	67.0	"Little Things" — One Direction	9.72%	—N/a	Third place
Matt & Brianne	10.0	10.0	10.0	10.0	80.0	"Mr. Pinstripe Suit" — Big Bad Voodoo Daddy	26.14%	25.01%	Runners-up
Matt & Brianne	10.0	10.0	10.0	10.0	80.0	"Turn Up the Music" — Chris Brown	26.14%	25.01%	Runners-up

== Ratings ==
Official ratings are taken from BARB.

Episode	Date	Official ITV rating (millions)	Weekly rank	Share (%)	Official ITV HD rating (millions)	Total ITV viewers (millions)
Live show 1	6 January	7.49	7	30.5	0.83	8.32
Live results 1	6 January	6.80	11	25.0	0.69	7.49
Live show 2	13 January	6.92	14	27.0	0.64	7.56
Live results 2	13 January	6.41	15	23.8	0.58	6.99
Live show 3	20 January	6.88	11	26.7	0.65	7.53
Live results 3	20 January	5.45	15	18.2	0.51	5.96
Live show 4	27 January	6.73	11	28.2	0.62	7.35
Live results 4	27 January	4.99	15	17.2	0.48	5.47
Live show 5	3 February	6.59	12	27.4	0.68	7.27
Live results 5	3 February	5.22	17	18.1	0.52	5.74
Live show 6	10 February	6.44	12	26.4	0.61	7.05
Live results 6	10 February	4.94	15	17.3	0.49	5.43
Live show 7	17 February	6.32	12	27.7	0.67	6.99
Live results 7	17 February	5.02	14	17.6	0.45	5.47
Live show 8	24 February	6.12	13	26.6	0.62	6.74
Live results 8	24 February	4.97	16	17.7	0.57	5.54
Live show 9	3 March	6.67	11	28.1	0.63	7.30
Live results 9	3 March	5.31	15	17.8	0.50	5.81
Live final	10 March	6.63	12	24.5	0.73	7.36
