= Copycats =

Children's television game show

- Genre: Game show
- Presented by: Sam Nixon; Mark Rhodes
- Voices of: Alan Dedicoat (series 2 onward)
- Composers: Gavin Griffiths (series 1); Marc Sylvan (series 2-4)
- Country of origin: United Kingdom
- Original language: English
- No. of series: 4
- No. of episodes: 182 (inc. 1 special)

Production
- Running time: 28 minutes
- Production company: BBC Scotland

Original release
- Network: CBBC
- Release: 23 November 2009 – 13 December 2016

Copycats is a children's game show which aired on CBBC and was presented by double act Sam & Mark (Sam Nixon and Mark Rhodes). It involved two teams of friends and family, each of six contestants (three children, three adults), battling against each other in a series of games. Each episode consists of a number of rounds. Three of the rounds were based on chinese whispers. These alternate with physical challenges, which varied from episode to episode.

On 17 January 2016, Sam & Mark announced on their Twitter that Copycats would return after a three-year absence. The new series was filmed in March. The new series of "Copycats" had a brand new look with new opening titles, new logo, new games and new set. A christmas special aired on 13 December 2016. In 2017, it was announced that the show had been cancelled. Repeats of the final series continued until 2018.

== Games ==
=== Chinese whispers-style rounds ===
These rounds form the general theme of Copycats. Each team plays in turn. The members of the team are each placed in cubicles separated by sliding doors. Each team member has just 10 seconds to copy the words on the card. The rounds of this form are:

Mime Time
An action, conveyed by miming. Examples are, "Flipping a pancake" or "Clipping Your Toenails".
Quick on the Draw
An object, drawn rapidly on a whiteboard.
Music Round
A musical piece, conveyed by performing it on a kazoo, or by mouthing the words clearly to the next team member.

In each case, the entity to be identified is given to the first member of the team, who must communicate it to the second by the given means, who must in turn communicate it to the third, and so on. The last, sixth member is then asked what was being mimed, drawn or played. If this player correctly identifies the action, object or tune that was originally supplied, the team scores 50 points. Otherwise, the remaining players are asked in turn, with the available score decreasing by 10 for each player who fails to answer correctly.

The winner of Mime Time (or if the game is a draw, the winner of a rock-paper-scissors game) will then play the first physical challenge, with the other team playing after Quick on the Draw.

=== Physical challenges ===
Game	Description
Donut Dash	The team one after another pull themselves along from one end of the course to the other in a giant doughnut with a rope. At the other end they place a doughnut on their spiked helmets and pull themselves back. If all the team retrieve doughnuts in the time limit, they get 50 points. If they fail, the other team get 25 points.
Basket Heads	There are 3 'throwers'. They chuck balls into the basket on the 3 'basket heads' heads. Then they have to move on stilts to another basket and place the balls in. If they get 15 balls in, they get 50 points. If they fail, the other team get 25 points.
Loo Lid Lob	The team drive in motorised toilets and baths. They drive to a stack of loo rolls, place one on their spiked helmets, and drive to the 'scoring zone'. Then they have to throw the loo roll through a loo lid that is moving up and down. If they throw 6 rolls through the lid in the time then they get 50 points. If they fail, the other team get 25 points.
Big Foot Bangers	This game is for both teams. 3 members of each team have to walk on their pair of giant foot-shaped stilts. The teams race to pop all their balloons with their feet first. The team to pop all their balloons first gets 50 points.
Park Your Pooch	All the team have to move their remote-controlled numbered pooches into their corresponding numbered kennel in the time limit. There are balls, toy cats and plastic bones in the way. If they succeed, they get 50 points. If they fail, the other team get 25 points.
Vibration Station	All the team have to load up their plates with food, made up of grapefruit, onions, eggs, lemons and oranges. Then they go on to a platform which vibrates. They have to keep as much food on their plate as possible. They need to have 5 grapefruit, 5 onions, 5 eggs, 5 lemons and 5 oranges left on their plate between them when the vibrations stop to get 50 points. If they fail, the other team get 25 points.
Blow Ball	All the team have their own blower. They are divided into 3 pairs where each pair has their own course and goal. The first pair has to get their ball through the course into the goal to set off the next pair. They get their ball into the goal and set off the last pair, who have to get their ball into their goal all in the time limit. If they succeed they get 50 points, if they fail, the other team get 25 points.
Trolley Ball	The team are divided into 3 pairs. One player in the pair will be blindfolded and push the other player in a trolley with a ball. The player in the trolley has to guide the blindfolded player around the course to the shooting line and throw their ball into the basket. The team need to get 5 balls into the basket in the time limit to get 50 points. If they fail, the other team get 25 points.
Eggscalator	The team have to run one after another against a conveyor belt going in the opposite direction. Halfway down there is a giant chicken above laying eggs. The player has to catch one and run to the end and put it into the basket. The conveyor belt gets faster and faster. If they get 15 eggs in the time limit they get 50 points. If they fail the other team get 25 points.
Balloon Bum Burst	The team have to burst all the red balloons with their over-sized nappies. There are also blue decoy balloons. If they succeed, they get 50 points. If they fail, the other team get 25 points.
Star Strike	The team have to run against a conveyor belt with a big ball and chuck it at 8 poles with celebrities on them. If they knock them all down in the time limit, they get 50 points. If they fail, the other team get 25 points.
Barmy Boot Shoot	The team all drive remote-controlled boots and have to get a big ball into the goal. If they get 3 balls in, in the time limit, they get 50 points. If they fail, the other team get 25 points.
Buzzheads	The team have to complete one after another their section of the course. They have electric rings on their helmets and have avoid the electric wire. If they complete it in the time limit, they get 50 points. If they fail, the other team get 25 points.
Wheelie Pops	The team is split into 3 pairs. 1 of each pair sit inside a wheelbarrow and the other controls it blindfolded. The player in the wheelbarrow has to guide the blindfolded player to run over and pop the balloons. If they pop all the balloons in the time limit, they get 50 points. If they fail, the other team get 25 points.
Flipper Flappers	The team have run against a conveyor belt one after another with inflated fish and put it in the 'pond' while wearing a pair of flippers. If they put all the fish into the 'pond', they get 50 points. If they fail, the other team get 25 points.
Hamster Ball Havoc	This is the final game of the show. It is a race between the teams. The teams run around the course one after another in a giant hamster ball. Knocking down the balls on pillars take away 25 points. The first team to finish the course gets 100 points.

== Transmissions ==
=== Series ===
Series	Start date	End date	Episodes
1	23 November 2009	16 February 2010	52
2	8 November 2010	1 February 2011	52
3	17 December 2011	5 March 2012	52
4	29 April 2016	15 October 2016	25

=== Special ===
Date	Entitle
13 December 2016	Christmas Special
