= Stu Francis =

British comedian (born 1948)

Stuart G. G. Francis (born 30 January 1948 in Bolton, Lancashire, England) is a British comedian with a camp style of delivery who achieved celebrity as lead presenter on the children's television programme Crackerjack (1980–1984). His principal "co hosts" were initially the Krankies and later, on alternating editions, Basil Brush and The Great Soprendo. He went on to host Ultra Quiz in 1985 and Border TV's Crush a Grape in 1987, a children's game and variety show in a similar vein, if not carbon copy, to his era of Crackerjack. He also released a single in 1983 (rereleased in 1985) called "Ooh! I could crush a grape".

After attending Brownlow Fold Junior School and Smithills Base School, both in Bolton, he worked as a bluecoat entertaining guests at Pontins holiday camps. He then switched to comedy and appeared in summer seasons at clubs and in theatres.

== Catchphrases ==
Francis had numerous catchphrases on Crackerjack, mostly based on his prolific "Ooh! I could crush a grape!!". Other variations included: "I could pop a balloon", "I could rip a tissue", "I could jump off a doll's house", "I could wrestle an action man", "I could duff a daffodil", "I could test drive a Tonka", "I could pummel a peach", and "I could eat a whole sausage roll".

Another catchphrase was "There's points to be won, and there are penalties to pay!" used on Crackerjack's final game Take A Chance, where the "penalty" was a gunging to either an unfortunate celebrity and/or to Francis himself.

== Television ==
Television appearances include:

- Jokers Wild
- Ultra Quiz (1985)
- Live from Her Majesty's (1985)
- The Comedians (1971)
- Crackerjack hosted 1980–1984, guest 2020
- Cheggers Plays Pop (1983) episode 6.7
- The Children's Royal Variety Performance (1983)
- CiTV (1983) Presenter (1983–1985)
- The Keith Harris Show
- Ultra Quiz 85 (1986) episode 3.5
- Stupid Punts (2004)
- Our Survey Says: The Ultimate Game Show Moments (2005)
- Sooty (2013) Series 2, episode 14 “Cow Capers”
- The Wheeltappers and Shunters Social Club episode 27 (1975)
