= Skate Nation =

- Starring: Sam Nixon; Mark Rhodes
- Country of origin: United Kingdom

Production
- Executive producer: Elaine Bancroft
- Running time: 60 minutes

Original release
- Network: BBC Two
- Release: 18 July 2009 – 2 January 2010

Skate Nation is a British children's television programme presented by Sam Nixon and Mark Rhodes broadcast by CBBC on BBC Two in 2009. It was an eleven-part series in which fourteen teams of roller skaters competed for a trip to the World Games in Taiwan. Each team consisted of three children aged 7 – 13 and an adult.

The teams competed in one of two heats to reach the final ten, who attended a skate camp. From there eight team progressed to the studio shows, where each week one team was eliminated. Their performances in the stadium were judged by a panel consisting of Kevin Adams, Camilla Dallerup, and Asha Kirkby, as well as the studio audience. The two lowest-placed teams had to take part in the skate showdown, after which the judges voted to save one team.

The eleventh show showed the series winners in Taiwan and also the Skate Nation "Oscars". This was broadcast some time after the original series in January 2010.

== The teams ==
Fourteen teams took part. The teams were made of skaters from many different disciplines and styles of roller skating.

There were six artistic roller skating teams: Three Blondes And A Baldy, Wheeled Wonders, Roller Rockets, Angels, Fab Four, and Blue Sherbert.

There were two roller hockey teams: Pirates (quads) and Slap Shots (inlines).

There were two speed skating teams: Rapid Rollers and Hypa Stry.k.

There was one aggressive skating team: Blades Of Glory.

There were two jam skating teams: Essence and Toe Jammers.

There was one freestyle team: Coast Bladers

== Episode list ==
Episode #	Description	Air date	Left the show
1	The first seven teams (Pirates, Rapid Rollers, Essence, Toe Jammers, Coast Bladers, Three Blondes And A Baldy, and Wheeled Wonders) compete for five places in Skate Camp.	18 July 2009	Toe Jammers, Wheeled Wonders
2	The second set of teams (Slap Shots, Blades Of Glory, Hypa Stry.k, Roller Rockets, Angels, Fab Four, and Blue Sherbert) compete for five places in Skate Camp.	25 July 2009	Hyper Stry.k, Blue Sherbert
3	The ten remaining teams go to Skate Camp where they practice skills such as stops, glides, jumps, and spins. On the second evening, there is a roller disco at which the adult team members perform a routine to Mamma Mia. At the end of the three days, each team must show their skills and perform a short routine.	1 August 2009	Pirates
4	The nine teams go to Pro Skate Camp where they have to learn more new skills, including the barrel roll, the moon walk, the side surf, and the New York Shuffle. Each team is also given a new routine to learn, which they will perform in next week's stadium show, if they get past the judges. The teams also try their hand at roller hockey, which the Coast Bladers win. There is a last minute crisis as Michaela from the Roller Rockets twists her ankle, meaning her team have to perform as a threesome.	8 August 2009	Three Blondes and a Baldy
5	First stadium show. The eight teams compete in the first stadium show being judged by the audience as well as the series judges. In the skate showdown: Fab Four and Blades of Glory	15 August 2009	Fab Four
6	Second stadium Show. There is a shock withdrawal by the Angels due to an injury to Olivia. The other teams perform their second stadium routine. In the skate showdown: Essence and Slap Shots	22 August 2009	Angels (withdrew), Slap Shots
7	Third stadium show with a circus theme. Blades of Glory did a lion-taming routine, Essence were clowns, Rapid Rollers were jugglers, Coast Bladers were strong men and Roller Rockets were acrobats. The teams were also shown taking part in a raft-building and racing activity, with Roller Rockets winning the race. In the skate showdown: Rapid Rollers and Blades of Glory	29 August 2009	Blades of Glory
8	Quarter-final. The teams do routines based on films. Rapid Rollers did a routine based on Harry Potter, Essence did Hairspray, Roller Rockets' routine was based on Star Wars, and Coast Bladers did Shrek. Also they get judged on a slalom battle. The teams also got to try another style of skating: Essence tried speed skating, Rapid Rollers tried jam skating, Roller Rockets tried aggressive skating at a skate park and Coast Bladers tried artistic roller skating. In the skate showdown: Rapid Rollers and Roller Rockets	5 September 2009	Rapid Rollers
9	Semi-final. The last three teams do routines based on countries: Coast Bladers had Spain, Roller Rockets did a USA-themed routine and Essence a Bollywood routine. The show also had a routine by British Champion roller-dancers Darren Dyke and Kirsty Chick, who represented Great Britain at the 2009 World Games. In the skate showdown: Roller Rockets and Essence.	12 September 2009	Roller Rockets
10	The Grand Final. Essence and Coast Bladers perform two routines: a new one summing up their time on Skate Nation and their routine from week 7, with the circus theme. Both teams also set a climbing wall challenge, which is won by Coast Bladers. Mark Rhodes and Sam Nixon perform on skates. The other eight teams who made it to the stadium shows make a brief appearance. After the judges' scores and audience vote have been added together Essence and Coast Bladers are tied, so their scores from the judges and audience from all stadium shows are added and Coast Bladers are confirmed as the winners.	19 September 2009	Essence
11	Winners show and Skate Nation "Oscars".	2 January 2010	
