= Glee Club (TV series) =

British television series

- Also known as: Sport/Comic Relief Does Glee Club
- Directed by: Pati Marr
- Presented by: Sam & Mark; Naomi Wilkinson
- Judges: Carrie Grant; David Grant; Sisco Gomez; John Modi
- Country of origin: United Kingdom
- No. of series: 4
- No. of episodes: 35

Production
- Producer: Chris Hulme
- Running time: 30–60 minutes

Original release
- Network: BBC One; CBBC
- Release: 14 March 2011 – 21 March 2014

Sport/Comic Relief Does Glee Club is a British television programme aired on BBC One and CBBC. Presented by Sam & Mark and Naomi Wilkinson, the first contest aired between 14 and 18 March 2011, and was won by Soulmates. The second series was aired between 12 and 23 March 2012, and was won by The Real Deal. The third series aired between 4 and 15 March 2013 and was won by Resonate. The fourth series was aired between 10 and 21 March 2014 and was won by Musicality.

== Format ==
=== Series 1 ===
In the first series, the glee clubs had to perform songs in different categories. There were three heats, a semi-final and a final.

=== Series 2 ===
In the second series there were eight heats. In the first round the three groups took turns to perform part of the same song as an ensemble (but all on the stage at the same time) with points being deducted for any featured vocals. The second round featured the groups taking it in turns to perform a song of their choice, but this time allowing solo/featured vocals with points being awarded. The final round saw the glee clubs taking to the stage individually and performing their "survival song".

=== Series 3– ===
The third series onwards carried largely the same format as the first two series. There were five heats as opposed to eight, and there were only two rounds (with the second round featured in the second round scrapped). The third series onwards showed the selection process for the heats. Guest judges were also featured in this segment.

Throughout the heats, the judges score the clubs on vocal ability, creativity and performance and their combined score all together determined who wins the heat. The top 5 ranked groups out of all the heats were chosen to go to the live semifinals - whether or not the groups won the heat. The heat winners are awarded with medals. Promotional clips for Sport/Comic Relief are often shown in between each segment as the judges are verifying the scores. In earlier series (series 1 and 2), the total is out of 270, 90 points awarded for each round. Since the third series, a total of 240 points are up for grabs, 120 per round.

The live semifinals featured a phone vote, allowing viewers to vote for their favorite group; however, the judges still scored the glee clubs in the event of a tiebreak. The semi finals consisted of one performance from the glee clubs. The top three groups were put through to the final, where the same rules applied. It usually consisted of a guest performance.

The show is filmed at the BBC Scotland studios. Initial auditions take place in Glasgow, Manchester, London, Belfast, Birmingham, Bristol and Newcastle in front of vocal coach John Modi. These initial auditions are often featured but not fully televised. The top 24 glee clubs are picked by Modi to progress in the competition.

== Judges and presenters ==
Carrie Grant, David Grant, and Sisco Gomez served as judges for the first two series. The judges' auditions in the third series featured Carrie and David Grant, vocal coach John Modi (who also took part in the heats from the third series) and guest judges Dionne Bromfield, Stacey Solomon, and Joe McElderry. Gomez did not feature in the judges' auditions for the third series, but joined the Grants and Modi from the heats onwards. The fourth series featured Bromfield, Kerry Ellis and Erin Boag as guest judges for the judges auditions.

The show was presented solely by Sam & Mark for the first two series. Naomi Wilkinson presented the judges' auditions for the third series and served as backstage presenter for the studio shows while Sam & Mark presented the main show.

== Comic Relief Does Glee Club (series 1 - 2011) ==
=== Reception ===
Show	Date	Viewers	Share
Heat 1	14 March	976,000	6.22%
Heat 2	15 March	910,000	5.78%
Heat 3	16 March	885,000	5.65%
Semifinal	17 March	880,000	5.64%
Final	18 March	1,008,000	6.45%
Series average	2011	931,000	5.94%

== Sport Relief Does Glee Club (series 2 - 2012) ==
=== Reception ===
Show	Date	Viewers	Share
Heat 1	12 March	258,000	2.44%
Heat 2	13 March	212,000	1.91%
Heat 3	14 March	189,000	1.74%
Heat 4	15 March	244,000	2.33%
Heat 5	16 March	227,000	1.92%
Heat 6	19 March	255,000	2.34%
Heat 7	20 March	183,000	1.83%
Heat 8	21 March	195,000	1.95%
Semifinal	22 March	581,000 (Note: 216,000 viewers on CBBC, 365,000 on BBC One.)	5.68%
Final	23 March	1,223,000 (Note: 403,000 viewers on CBBC, 820,000 viewers on BBC One)	8.64%
Series average	2012	357,000	3.07%

== Comic Relief Does Glee Club (Series 3 - 2013) ==
=== Judges' auditions ===
The guest judges for the judges' auditions were Dionne Bromfield, Joe McElderry, and Stacey Solomon.

==== Show 1 ====
Act	Performance	Guest judge	Status
M.A.D	"Shackles (Praise You)"	Joe McElderry	Through to heats
Triple Threat	"Under Pressure/"No-One but You (Only the Good Die Young)"	Stacey Solomon	Eliminated
The Sweets	"She Said"	Dionne Bromfield	Through to heats
Encore	"Picking Up the Pieces"	Joe McElderry	Through to heats
Fly Beat	"I've Got the Music in Me"	Dionne Bromfield	Eliminated
Resonate	"Emotion"	Joe McElderry	Through to heats
Blue Note	"Wildest Moments"	Stacey Solomon	Eliminated
Raveheart	"Wings"	Stacey Solomon	Through to heats

==== Show 2 ====
Act	Performance	Guest judge	Status
Excellar8	"We Are Young"	Stacey Solomon	Through to heats
Fresh	"Don't Stop Movin'"	Joe McElderry	Eliminated
Impact	"Perfect"	Dionne Bromfield	Through to heats
True To Your Skool	"Will You Be There"	Joe McElderry	Eliminated
Musicality	"Joyful, Joyful"	Joe McElderry	Through to heats
New Creation	"Picking Up the Pieces"	Dionne Bromfield	Through to heats
6 String	"Count on Me"	Dionne Bromfield	Eliminated
Diva 8	"Some Nights"	Joe McElderry	Through to heats

==== Show 3 ====
Act	Performance	Guest judge	Status
The Peppermints	"Tears in Heaven"/"Wings"	Stacey Solomon	Through to heats
Activ8	"Domino"	Joe McElderry	Eliminated
Allsorts	"Stereo Hearts"/"LaserLight	Dionne Bromfield	Through to heats
Bittersweet	"Material Girl"	Joe McElderry	Through to heats
Domino	"Blame It on the Boogie"	Joe McElderry	Eliminated
Figure of Eight	"Hold On"	Joe McElderry	Through to heats
Gr8 Expectations	"Pinball Wizard"	Dionne Bromfield	Eliminated
LS8	"The Time Warp"	Joe McElderry	Through to heats

=== Studio Heats ===
Key	Eliminated	Heat winners	Semi-finalists	Heat winners and semi-finalists

==== Heat one ====
Act	First performance	Second performance	Score
Excellar8	"Troublemaker"	"Diamonds"	165
LS8	"Troublemaker"	"It's Oh So Quiet"	177
Diva8	"Troublemaker"	"Waterfalls"	154

==== Heat two ====
Act	First performance	Second performance	Score
Musicality	"The Climb"	"Proud Mary"	173
New Creation	"The Climb"	"Wide Awake"	—N/a
Encore	"The Climb"	"You Bring Me Joy"	144

==== Heat three ====
Act	First performance	Second performance	Score
Raveheart	"Call My Name"	"Sisters Are Doin' It for Themselves"	191
The Peppermints	"Call My Name"	"Swagger Jagger"	—N/a
Figure of Eight	"Call My Name"	"I Don't Want to Miss a Thing"	144

==== Heat four ====
Act	First performance	Second performance	Score
The Sweets	"Live While We're Young"	"Payphone"	—N/a
Impact	"Live While We're Young"	"Stand By Me"	—N/a
M.A.D	"Live While We're Young"	"I Knew You Were Trouble"	183

==== Heat five ====
Act	First performance	Second performance	Score
Resonate	"Wings"	"Run"	179
Bittersweet	"Wings"	"The Promise"	178
Allsorts	"Wings"	"Joyful, Joyful"	—N/a

=== Semi-final ===
Key	Eliminated	Finalists

- Performance: Nina Nesbitt – "Stay Out"

Act	Performance	Status
Bittersweet	"Broken Heels"	Eliminated
Resonate	"Beneath Your Beautiful"	Finalists
M.A.D	"River Deep – Mountain High"	Eliminated
LS8	"Kids in America"	Finalists
Raveheart	"Jump (for My Love)"	Finalists

=== Final ===
Key	Winners

- Performance: Alexandra Burke – "Elephant"

Act	Performance	Status
Resonate	"I Dreamed a Dream"	Winners
LS8	"Forget You"	Runners-up
Raveheart	"E.T"/"DNA"	Runners-up

=== Reception ===
Show	Date	Viewers	Share
Judges' auditions 1	4 March	213,000	1.9%
Judges' auditions 2	5 March	244,000	2.2%
Judges' auditions 3	6 March	278,000	2.2%
Heat 1	7 March	259,000	2.1%
Heat 2	8 March	241,000	2.0%
Heat 3	11 March	202,000	1.6%
Heat 4	12 March	231,000	1.9%
Heat 5	13 March	218,000	1.9%
Semifinal	14 March	964,000 (Note: 179,000 viewers on CBBC and 786,000 viewers on BBC One)	8.8% (Note: 1.6% share on CBBC and 7.2% share on BBC One)
Final	15 March	1,180,000 (Note: 244,000 viewers on CBBC and 937,000 viewers on BBC One.)	10.1% (Note: 2.1% share on CBBC and 8% share on BBC One.)
Series average	2013	403,000	3.5%

== Sport Relief Does Glee Club (Series 4 - 2014) ==
=== Judges' auditions ===
The guest judges for the judges' auditions were Dionne Bromfield, Kerry Ellis and Erin Boag.

==== Show one ====
Act	Performance	Guest judge	Status
VoxBox	"Joyful, Joyful"	Dionne Bromfield	Through to heats
Encore	"Falling"	Dionne Bromfield	Through to heats
Miss Chief	"Revolting Children/When I Grow Up"	Kerry Ellis	Through to heats
Triple Threat	"Mirrors"/"Man in the Mirror"	Erin Boag	Eliminated
MT13	"Wings"	Kerry Ellis	Through to heats
Rococo	"Some Nights"	Dionne Bromfield	Eliminated
Swing and Jazz	"It Don't Mean a Thing (If It Ain't Got That Swing)"	Kerry Ellis	Eliminated
The Peppermints	"Titanium"/"Wannabe"	Dionne Bromfield	Through to heats

==== Show two ====
Act	Performance	Guest judge	Status
Hi'Jinx	"I Love It"	Erin Boag	Through to heats
Figure8	"Starships"	Dionne Bromfield	Eliminated
#BOOM!	"Wings"	Erin Boag	Through to heats
Harmonee	"Super Trouper"	Kerry Ellis	Eliminated
React	"Some Nights"	Erin Boag	Through to heats
Inferno	"Naughty"	Kerry Ellis	Through to heats
All Sorts	"Sweet Georgia Brown"	Erin Boag	Eliminated
Musicality	"Mr. Blue Sky"	Dionne Bromfield	Through to heats

==== Show three ====
Act	Performance	Guest judge	Status
The Gleeks	"Supercalifragilisticexpialidocious"	Kerry Ellis	Through to heats
A-List	"Price Tag"	Erin Boag	Through to heats
Roar Mania	"Roar"	Dionne Bromfield	Eliminated
Abstract	"I Will Survive"	Erin Boag	Through to heats
Tenacity^1	"Mirrors"	Dionne Bromfield	Eliminated
Unity 7	"Shake It Out"	Erin Boag	Through to heats
Young Vibe	"Mercy"	Dionne Bromfield	Eliminated
BuSKerS	"Next To Me"	Dionne Bromfield	Through to heats

^{1} Tenacity were unable to progress to the heats, so Unity 7 took their place.

=== Studio Heats ===
Key	Eliminated	Heat winners	Semi-finalists	Heat winners and semi-finalists

==== Heat one ====
Act	First performance	Second performance	Score
Hi'Jinx	"Story of My Life"	"Call Me Maybe"	142
Voxbox	"Story of My Life"	"Man in the Mirror"	165
The Gleeks	"Story of My Life"	"We Go Together"	170

==== Heat two ====
Act	First performance	Second performance	Score
Miss Chief	"Roar"	"Price Tag"	64^2
Inferno	"Roar"	"Hard Knock Life"	153
Unity 7	"Roar"	"Love Story"	163

==== Heat three ====
Act	First performance	Second performance	Score
BuSKerS	"Applause"	"Seasons of Love"	49^2
The Peppermints	"Applause"	"Move"	70^2
A-List	"Applause"	"Reach Out I'll Be There"	176

==== Heat four ====
Act	First performance	Second performance	Score
MT13	"Mirrors"	"I Want You Back"	174
Encore	"Mirrors"	"It's My Party"	66^2
Abstract	"Mirrors"	"You Keep Me Hanging On"	172

==== Heat five ====
Act	First performance	Second performance	Score
Musicality	"Pompeii"	"Somewhere Only We Know"	194
React	"Pompeii"	"Treasure"	77^2
#BOOM!	"Pompeii"	"Signed, Sealed, Delivered I'm Yours"	173

^{2} Score after round 1.

=== Semi-final ===
Key	Eliminated	Finalists

- Performance: Foxes – "Let Go for Tonight"

Act	Performance	Status
Abstract	"Halo"	Eliminated
MT13	"Rather Be"	Finalists
#BOOM!	"I Won't Give Up"	Eliminated
A-List	"Dynamite"	Finalists
Musicality	"Strong"	Finalists

=== Final ===
Key	Winners

- Performance: Neon Jungle – "Welcome to the Jungle"

Act	Performance	Status
MT13	"Lost in Music"	Runners-up
A-List	"A Thousand Years"	Runners-up
Musicality	"Impossible"	Winners
