= Sam Nixon =

English singer and television presenter (born 1986)

Samuel Nixon
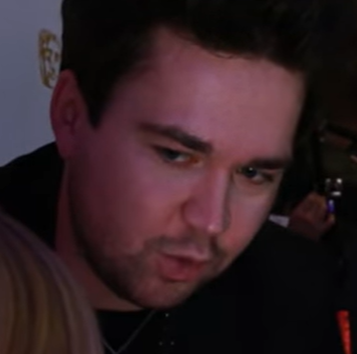
- Nixon in 2015
- Born: 21 March 1986 (age 40); Monk Bretton, Barnsley, South Yorkshire, England
- Education: Holgate School; Barnsley College
- Occupations: Singer, television presenter
- Years active: 1998–present
- Known for: Pop Idol; Top of the Pops Reloaded; TMi; Copycats; Crackerjack
- Spouse: Anne Foy (m. 2012)
- Children: 2

Samuel Nixon is an English singer and television presenter. He came third on the Pop Idol television series in 2003 and is now one half of the duo Sam & Mark, with the other being fellow Pop Idol contestant Mark Rhodes.

== Early life ==
He was originally a catering student from Barnsley College in South Yorkshire. He attended Holgate School, Barnsley from 1997 to 2002 and is still living in Barnsley.

== Career ==
=== Television ===
Nixon's first television appearance was on popular children's game show Fun House presented by Pat Sharp. Nixon and fellow contestant Rosie Feast didn't manage to answer the final question to win the grand prize.

Nixon began a television presenting career, co-hosting Top of the Pops Reloaded. He then formed a presentational double-act on the BAFTA winning CBBC show Level Up, with Mark Rhodes, from 3 April 2006 until 1 September 2006. He worked on the children's Saturday morning show, TMi, on BBC Two, which started on 17 September 2006. The series finished on 7 February 2007. Sam returned to television at the beginning of the Easter holidays 2007 in a show called Do Something Different which he presents with Rhodes and Ayesha Asantewaa to attempt to get 1 million children to "try something new". Sam (along with Mark Rhodes) is the presenter of TMi Friday on the CBBC Channel. Sam and Mark are now hosting Sam & Mark's Big Friday Wind-Up, which features mainly trivia, as well as playing a prank on families.

Sam and Mark took part in two episodes of Hole in the Wall airing on 11 October 2008 and 14 November 2009 and were contestants on a celebrity version of TV show Total Wipeout which aired on 2 January 2010.

In 2012, Nixon took part in the seventh series of Dancing on Ice. He was voted out of the show on 26 February 2012. In 2015, he participated in Celebrity MasterChef on BBC One.

=== Music ===
Sam & Mark had a No. 1 UK chart hit with their cover of The Beatles tune "With a Little Help from My Friends". Their second single "The Sun Has Come Your Way" debuted in the UK top 40 at No. 19, but they were dropped from their record deal after this release.

Nixon also performs in a band called Mason. Mason performed their first gig on 2 June 2007 at the "Burn down the Disco" night at The Arches in Barnsley, supported by local band MUNICH, and also headlined a local mini music festival at Darton, Barnsley a month later. They continue to perform local gigs as and when Sam's TV schedule allows.

=== Radio ===
From 2009 to 2015, Sam & Mark presented a Sunday show on Midlands-based radio station Free Radio.

Nixon is currently a cover presenter across BBC Local Radio in Yorkshire on BBC Radio Sheffield, BBC Radio Leeds and BBC Radio York.

=== Theatre ===
In 2019, Nixon appeared as Jack in Theatre Royal Wakefield's version of Jack and the Beanstalk.

In 2021, Nixon returned to perform at the Theatre Royal Wakefield in their version of Beauty and the Beast.

In 2024, Nixon performed at the Theatre Royal Wakefield in their version of Cinderella playing the part of Buttons.

== Filmography ==
Television

Year	Title	Notes
1998	Fun House	Contestant
2003	Pop Idol	Contestant, came third place
2004–2006	Top of the Pops Reloaded	Co-presenter
2006	Level Up	Main presenter
2006–2010	TMi	Main presenter
2007	Do Something Different	Main presenter
2008	SMart	Guest presenter
2008	Sam and Mark's Guide to Dodging Disaster	Main presenter
2008, 2009	Hole in the Wall	Contestant
2009	Who Wants to Be a Superhero?	
2009	CBBC	Continuity presenter
2009	Skate Nation	Main presenter
2009–2016	Copycats	Main presenter
2010	Jump Nation	Main presenter
2010	BBC News Channel	Entertainment correspondent/anchorman
2011–	Comic Relief Does Glee Club	Main presenter
2011–2019	Sam & Mark's Big Friday Wind-Up	Main presenter
2012	Dancing on Ice	Contestant
2013	Hacker Time	Guest
2014–2015, 2018	The Dog Ate My Homework	Contestant; 3 episodes
2015	Celebrity MasterChef	Contestant, finalist
2020–2021	CrackerJack	Main presenter

== Pop Idol performances ==
- Top 50: "Walking in Memphis" by (Marc Cohn)
- Wildcards: "Over My Shoulder" (Mike + The Mechanics)
- Top 12: "Handbags & Gladrags" (Rod Stewart)
- Top 10: "True Colours" (Cyndi Lauper)
- Top 8: "I Want Love" (Elton John)
- Top 7: "Blame It on the Boogie" (Jackson 5)
- Top 6: "With A Little Help From My Friends" (The Beatles)
- Top 5: "Mr. Bojangles" (Sammy Davis Jr.)
- Top 4: "Santa Claus Is Coming To Town" (Bruce Springsteen)
- Top 4: "I Wish It Could Be Christmas Everyday" (Wizzard)
- Top 3: "Always" (Bon Jovi)
- Top 3: "Maggie May" (Rod Stewart)

== Discography ==
Singles

- "With a Little Help from My Friends" – Sam & Mark (March 2004)
- "The Sun Has Come Your Way" – Sam & Mark (May 2004)
