= Top of the Pops Reloaded =

- Top of the Pops Reloaded title card
- Also known as: Top of the Pops Saturday
- Based on: Top of the Pops
- Starring: Fearne Cotton; Sam Nixon; Mark Rhodes; Emilia Coxe; Jason King; Joel Ross
- Theme music composer: Tony Gibber
- Opening theme: "Now Get Out of That"
- Country of origin: United Kingdom
- Original language: English
- No. of episodes: 28

Production
- Executive producer: Sue Morgan
- Producers: Christina Brown & Lee Mogridge
- Running time: 45 minutes

Original release
- Network: BBC One; BBC Two; CBBC
- Release: 21 September 2002 – 25 March 2006

Related
- Top of the Pops; Top of the Pops@Play

Top of the Pops Reloaded, originally known as Top of the Pops Saturday (2002–2005), is a weekly children's music show that was broadcast as part of the Saturday morning CBBC schedule on BBC One and later BBC Two. It ran from 2002 to 2006. It was based on the programme Top of the Pops.

It was shown on BBC Two at 11 am on Saturdays and repeated at 6 pm on the CBBC on Sundays. Presenters included Fearne Cotton, Sam Nixon and Mark Rhodes. The show also regularly featured Radio 1 DJs Jason King and Joel Ross. From episode twelve onwards, a new feature was introduced where digital viewers could press their red button to access a different choice of music.

== Top of the Pops Saturday ==
Top of the Pops Saturday began on 21 September 2002 as part of the relaunched format of The Saturday Show, as a 45-minute show-within-a-show, taking up the final section of the programme; TOTP Saturday was presented by The Saturday Show's presenters of the time, Fearne Cotton and Simon Grant.

The introduction of TOTP Saturday was seen as an attempt by the BBC to combat the successful ITV Saturday morning series SMTV Live, the last hour of which was given over to music magazine CD:UK. Whereas the BBC had traditionally been dominant in the Saturday morning slot, SMTV Live and CD:UK were hugely successful, something which had contributed to the poor reception of the original version of The Saturday Show, and its subsequent relaunch.

== Top of the Pops Reloaded ==
Following the BBC's decision to end The Saturday Show as a year-round run (and instead run it between series of Dick & Dom in da Bungalow), TOTP Saturday split off and continued as a billed show in its own right, hosted primarily by Fearne Cotton. This continued until the summer of 2005, when the programme took a break from the screen, returning in the Reloaded format in September 2005. This ran alongside the final series of Dick & Dom in da Bungalow, and both Dick & Dom... and TOTP Reloaded ended in March 2006.

Shortly after the demise of TOTP Reloaded, the main weekly Top of the Pops also came to an end. As a result of the demise of the parent show, the Saturday morning spin-off was also decommissioned, though another spin-off series, Top of the Pops 2, featuring archived footage of Top of the Pops, continued.
