= Sam & Mark's TMi Friday =

British children's TV series

- Genre: Children's
- Presented by: Sam Nixon; Mark Rhodes; Caroline Flack (2006–2008)
- Country of origin: United Kingdom
- Original language: English
- No. of series: 5
- No. of episodes: 80

Production
- Production locations: Leicester Square (2006–07); BBC Television Centre (2007–10)
- Running time: 165 minutes (2006–07); 90 minutes (2007–09); 80 minutes (2010)

Original release
- Network: BBC Two (2006–09); CBBC (2010)
- Release: 16 September 2006 – 17 December 2010

Sam & Mark's TMi Friday (originally TMi) is a British children's entertainment programme that was produced for five series by the BBC and aired from 16 September 2006 to 17 December 2010.

== Format ==
TMi launched on 16 September 2006 as a Saturday morning show, airing in the autumn/winter months on BBC Two, replacing former occupant Dick & Dom in da Bungalow. Former Pop Idol contestants turned presenters Sam Nixon and Mark Rhodes, better known as Sam & Mark, were joined by Caroline Flack for a mix of cartoons, competitions, games, music videos and celebrity guests. The first series had a reality theme to the proceedings, which had never been done before on a children's Saturday morning show. This consisted of Sam and Mark living in the 'TMi flat' throughout the week, mainly rehearsing or practising for their weekly head to head challenges in the studio. In 2007, it had been reported that TMi had used a fake phone-in caller during the game, Birthday Bingo, on the first show.

The second series in 2007 saw the demise of the TMi flat and the introduction of a new theme where each week the presenters encouraged viewers to become their 'friend' on the show's website. Nixon, Rhodes and Flack would participate in various challenges, mostly involving gunge, in the hope of gaining new friends. This series also saw a change of location from MTV in Leicester Square to TC9 at BBC Television Centre, and a reduced time slot from the original 165 to 90 minutes.

Flack would later leave the programme after the third series, though her departure was not officially announced until the start of the fourth series in 2009 by Nixon and Rhodes - the last that would air on Saturday mornings.

In 2010 the programme returned with a new slot of Friday evenings on the CBBC Channel, and a new name - Sam & Mark's TMi Friday.

The final edition was broadcast on 17 December 2010.

== Transmissions ==
Series	Start date	End date	Episodes
1	16 September 2006	3 February 2007	24
2	8 September 2007	22 December 2007	16
3	27 September 2008	13 December 2008	12
4	26 September 2009	19 December 2009	13
5	10 September 2010	17 December 2010	15
