= Crackerjack! (TV programme) =

British children's TV series (1955–2021)

- Leslie Crowther and Peter Glaze, Radio Times, 25 September 1965
- Genre: Children's television
- Created by: Johnny Haddon Downes
- Presented by: Eamonn Andrews (1955–1964); Leslie Crowther (1964–1968); Michael Aspel (1968–1974); Ed Stewart (1975–1979); Stu Francis (1980–1984); Sam & Mark (2020–2021)
- Country of origin: United Kingdom
- Original language: English
- No. of series: 29 (original); 2 (revival)
- No. of episodes: 451 (original); 20 (revival)

Production
- Production locations: King's Studio (1955–1963); BBC Television Theatre (1963–1984); Dock10 (2020–2021)
- Running time: 40 minutes

Original release
- Network: BBC Television Service (1955–64); BBC 1 (1964–84)
- Release: 14 September 1955 – 21 December 1984
- Network: CBBC
- Release: 17 January 2020 – 5 March 2021

Crackerjack is a British children's television series which was initially aired on the BBC Television Service between 14 September 1955 and 21 December 1984 (with no series in 1971). The series was a variety show featuring comedy sketches, singers and quizzes, broadcast live with an audience.

Crackerjack returned in 2020. It was hosted by Sam & Mark, with an exclamation mark added to its original title, and aired on CBBC from 17 January. The second revived series aired from December 2020 to March 2021.

Its initial long run featured Eamonn Andrews, Max Bygraves, Leslie Crowther, Ed "Stewpot" Stewart, Jack Douglas, Stu Francis, Peter Glaze, Don Maclean, Michael Aspel, Little and Large, Jan Hunt, The Krankies, Basil Brush, Geoffrey Durham, Bernie Clifton, and Ronnie Corbett, amongst many others.

Performers who appeared as singers/dancers, assisting the host with games, included Sally Ann Triplett (Series 26), Julie Dorne-Brown (Series 27–28), and Ling Tai (Series 29).

== Format ==
Prizegiving on Crackerjack with Eamonn Andrews c. 1958

The shows were frantic, being broadcast live in front of an audience largely of children, originally at the King's Theatre on Hammersmith Road, London (marked today with a blue heritage plaque on the modern office block). This theatre was used by the BBC as the King's Studio for live and recorded broadcasts needing audiences until 1963, then at the BBC Television Theatre (since renamed the Shepherd's Bush Empire). The show opened with the tagline "It's Friday. It's five to five. It's Crackerjack!"

Audiences were recruited from the local secondary schools of west London, from whose ranks contestants were chosen each week. The format of the programme included competitive games for teams of children, a music spot by a current pop star, a comedy double act, and a finale in which the cast performed a short comic play, adapting popular songs of the day and incorporating them into the action. The whole audience would shout "Crackerjack!" whenever anybody said the word.

One of the games was a quiz called "Double or Drop", where each of three contestants was given a prize to hold for each question answered correctly, but given a cabbage if incorrect. They were out of the game if they dropped any of the items awarded or received a third cabbage. While the winner took his or her pick from a basket of toys, every runner-up won a much-envied marbled propelling pencil as a prize, which became so popular that in 1961 Queen Elizabeth II, who visited the programme, was presented with Crackerjack pencils for her children Prince Charles and Princess Anne.

During the early 1970s, high-profile pop guests included The Sweet, Mud, Gary Glitter and, on more than one occasion, Slade.

In 1982, in a bid to boost flagging ratings, Crackerjack introduced gunge into its games and launched a new game called Take a Chance in which the celebrity guests – one female, one male – could score extra points for the contestant they teamed up with by competing against Stu Francis in a quickfire question tie. A wrong answer or the opponent answering first would lead to Francis or the celebrity guest being covered in gunge - although in practice both Francis and the celebrity guest would be gunged anyway. The gunge was always given a name relating to a random theme or to the celebrity guest (Howling Wind for Ian McCaskill, for example).

The format of the final Series 27-29 was revived in all but name by Francis in 1987 for Border Television series Crush A Grape. Francis also toured a live version of his era's format for some time after the BBC cancellation, initially under the Crackerjack name but later as The All Star Laughter Show.

In 2019, CBBC premiered a revival of Crackerjack, hosted by former Big Friday Wind-Up presenters Sam & Mark; the reboot was designed to adapt the traditional aspects of the series for a modern audience, maintaining its focus on variety performances, games (with a retooled version of the original "Double or Drop" game returning as the show's culmination), and comedy sketches. The revival ran for two series in 2019 and 2020, with the latter produced under COVID-19 pandemic protocol.

== Transmissions ==
=== Original ===
Series	Start date	End date	Episodes	Host
1	14 September 1955	28 March 1956	15	Eamonn Andrews
2	12 September 1956	20 March 1957	14	Eamonn Andrews
3	9 October 1957	19 March 1958	12	Eamonn Andrews
4	10 September 1958	4 March 1959	13	Eamonn Andrews
5	1 October 1959	31 March 1960	14	Eamonn Andrews
6	29 September 1960	27 April 1961	16	Eamonn Andrews
7	19 October 1961	3 May 1962	15	Eamonn Andrews
8	13 September 1962	25 April 1963	17	Eamonn Andrews
9	26 September 1963	7 May 1964	17	Eamonn Andrews
10	9 October 1964	26 March 1965	23	Leslie Crowther
11	1 October 1965	25 March 1966	26	Leslie Crowther
12	7 October 1966	31 March 1967	26	Leslie Crowther
13	6 October 1967	16 February 1968	20	Leslie Crowther
14	13 September 1968	14 March 1969	26	Michael Aspel
15	26 September 1969	13 February 1970	19	Michael Aspel
16	7 January 1972	31 March 1972	13	Michael Aspel
17	2 February 1973	20 April 1973	12	Michael Aspel
18	4 January 1974	29 March 1974	13	Michael Aspel
19	3 January 1975	31 March 1975	13	Ed Stewart
20	24 December 1975	26 March 1976	14	Ed Stewart
21	7 January 1977	1 April 1977	13	Ed Stewart
22	6 January 1978	7 April 1978	14	Ed Stewart
23	29 September 1978	15 December 1978	12	Ed Stewart
24	28 September 1979	14 December 1979	13	Ed Stewart
25	26 September 1980	19 December 1980	13	Stu Francis
26	2 October 1981	18 December 1981	12	Stu Francis
27	22 October 1982	24 December 1982	10	Stu Francis
28	30 September 1983	23 December 1983	13	Stu Francis
29	28 September 1984	21 December 1984	13	Stu Francis

Only 148 out of 451 episodes from the original 29 series of the show survive in the BBC archives. The earliest episode known to exist is Episode 12 of series 3 with Eamonn Andrews; of his tenure, Episode 16 of Series 6, Episode 2 of Series 7, Episode 3 of Series 8 and Episodes 1 and 17 of Series 9 also survive. None of the Leslie Crowther episodes are known to exist, and two episodes only (Episodes 12–13 of Series 18) of the Michael Aspel period survive. All of the Ed Stewart (Series 19–24) and Stu Francis (Series 25–29) periods remain.

=== Revival ===
Series	Start date	End date	Episodes	Hosts
1	17 January 2020	20 March 2020	10	Sam Nixon & Mark Rhodes
2	11 December 2020	5 March 2021	10	Sam Nixon & Mark Rhodes
