= 2008 Nebelhorn Trophy =

Figure skating competition

- Type: Senior International
- Date: September 25 – 29
- Season: 2008–09
- Location: Oberstdorf
- Venue: Eislaufzentrum Oberstdorf

Champions
- Men's singles: (Japan) Nobunari Oda
- Ladies' singles: (United States) Alissa Czisny
- Pairs: (Germany) Aliona Savchenko / Robin Szolkowy
- Ice dance: (United States) Emily Samuelson / Evan Bates
- Previous: 2007 Nebelhorn Trophy
- Next: 2009 Nebelhorn Trophy

The 2008 Nebelhorn Trophy took place between September 25 and 29, 2008 at the Eislaufzentrum Oberstdorf. The compulsory dance was the Viennese Waltz. The competition held annually in Oberstdorf, Germany and is named after the Nebelhorn, a nearby mountain.

It is one of the first international senior competitions of the season. Skaters are entered by their respective national federations and compete in four disciplines: men's singles, ladies' singles, pair skating, and ice dance. The Fritz-Geiger-Memorial Trophy is presented to the team with the highest placements across all disciplines. In this year, it was awarded to the United States, with Canada coming in second and Germany coming in third.

== Results ==
=== Men ===
Rank	Name	Nation	Total points	SP		FS	
1	Nobunari Oda	Japan	224.67	1	77.91	1	146.76
2	Michal Březina	Czech Republic	220.29	2	75.84	2	144.45
3	Yannick Ponsero	France	197.71	8	61.79	3	135.92
4	Tomáš Verner	Czech Republic	197.38	3	70.65	4	126.73
5	Anton Kovalevski	Ukraine	179.92	6	62.03	5	117.89
6	Jeremy Ten	Canada	170.58	4	64.06	9	106.52
7	Scott Smith	United States	168.77	10	58.39	8	110.38
8	Dennis Phan	United States	168.40	5	62.11	10	106.29
9	Peter Liebers	Germany	166.06	13	53.49	7	112.57
10	Viktor Pfeifer	Austria	165.98	16	51.23	6	114.75
11	Konstantin Menshov	Russia	164.97	7	61.81	11	103.16
12	Ivan Tretiakov	Russia	154.95	14	52.87	12	101.26
13	Igor Macypura	Slovakia	152.36	9	59.34	17	93.02
14	Przemysław Domański	Poland	150.65	12	54.19	14	96.46
15	Joey Russell	Canada	148.83	11	56.89	18	91.94
16	Mikael Redin	Switzerland	147.79	17	50.06	13	97.73
17	Martin Liebers	Germany	146.21	15	52.10	15	94.11
18	Clemens Brummer	Germany	143.72	18	50.03	16	93.69
19	Maciej Cieplucha	Poland	128.85	19	46.07	19	82.78
20	Mikko Minkkinen	Finland	124.21	20	42.23	20	81.98
21	Justus Strid	Denmark	122.11	21	40.78	21	81.33
22	Luka Čadež	Slovenia	113.53	24	36.01	22	77.52
23	Maxim Shipov	Israel	107.34	22	37.99	23	69.35
24	Mark Webster	Australia	96.13	23	37.16	24	58.97
WD	Luis Hernández	Mexico					

=== Ladies ===
Rank	Name	Nation	Total points	SP		FS	
1	Alissa Czisny	United States	168.28	1	56.55	1	111.73
2	Laura Lepistö	Finland	154.21	2	55.04	2	99.17
3	Akiko Suzuki	Japan	146.93	3	55.02	3	91.91
4	Jelena Glebova	Estonia	131.63	4	50.24	7	81.39
5	Jenna McCorkell	United Kingdom	128.67	6	46.12	4	82.55
6	Myriane Samson	Canada	127.35	7	45.57	6	81.78
7	Kim Na-young	South Korea	123.65	9	41.78	5	81.87
8	Annette Dytrt	Germany	117.67	5	46.98	12	70.69
9	Sarah Hecken	Germany	113.77	12	36.18	8	77.59
10	Kristin Wieczorek	Germany	112.70	11	36.73	9	75.97
11	Katharina Häcker	Germany	110.76	10	41.16	14	69.60
12	Constanze Paulinus	Germany	109.23	15	33.96	10	75.27
13	Chrissy Hughes	United States	108.97	14	35.43	11	73.54
14	Tuğba Karademir	Turkey	108.03	8	44.83	15	63.20
15	Alexandra Ievleva	Russia	106.59	13	36.11	13	70.48
16	Nella Simaová	Czech Republic	95.63	16	33.53	17	62.10
17	Bettina Heim	Switzerland	94.71	17	31.84	16	62.87
18	Ana Cecilia Cantu	Mexico	88.06	21	29.53	18	58.53
19	Victoria Muniz	Puerto Rico	86.98	19	31.55	19	55.43
20	Emma Hagieva	Azerbaijan	85.23	20	31.39	21	53.84
21	Radka Bártová	Slovakia	81.31	22	26.20	20	55.11
22	Aneta Michałek	Poland	76.93	18	31.56	22	45.37
WD	Anastasia Gimazetdinova	Uzbekistan					

=== Pairs ===
Rank	Name	Nation	Total points	SP		FS	
1	Aliona Savchenko / Robin Szolkowy	Germany	183.22	1	67.73	1	115.49
2	Maria Mukhortova / Maxim Trankov	Russia	168.80	2	62.52	2	106.28
3	Tatiana Volosozhar / Stanislav Morozov	Ukraine	156.08	3	61.02	4	95.06
4	Caydee Denney / Jeremy Barrett	United States	149.55	4	52.11	3	97.44
5	Ekaterina Sheremetieva / Mikhail Kuznetsov	Russia	138.02	6	48.15	5	89.87
6	Caitlin Yankowskas / John Coughlin	United States	133.48	5	51.26	7	82.22
7	Rachel Kirkland / Eric Radford	Canada	131.45	7	48.04	6	83.41
8	Kyra Moscovitch / Dylan Moscovitch	Canada	123.13	8	45.65	9	77.48
9	Laura Magitteri / Ondřej Hotárek	Italy	119.88	10	41.53	8	78.35
10	Krystyna Klimczak / Janusz Karweta	Poland	113.14	9	44.31	10	68.83
11	Hayley Anne Sacks / Vadim Akolzin	Israel	92.69	11	36.07	12	56.62
12	Jessica Crenshaw / Chad Tsagris	Greece	92.23	12	34.36	11	57.87
WD	Marina Aganina / Dmitri Zobnin	Uzbekistan					

=== Ice dance ===
Rank	Name	Nation	Total points	CD		OD		FD	
1	Emily Samuelson / Evan Bates	United States	176.15	2	34.53	1	53.36	1	88.26
2	Alexandra Zaretski / Roman Zaretski	Israel	168.59	1	34.93	3	48.70	2	84.96
3	Jane Summersett / Todd Gilles	United States	163.53	3	30.54	2	48.99	3	84.00
4	Andrea Chong / Guillame Gfeller	Canada	151.42	6	29.35	4	46.24	4	75.83
5	Julia Zlobina / Alexei Sitnikov	Russia	145.41	5	29.46	8	42.86	5	73.09
6	Kamila Hájková / David Vincour	Czech Republic	144.19	7	28.72	6	45.83	6	69.64
7	Carolina Hermann / Daniel Hermann	Germany	142.28	8	26.92	5	45.95	7	69.41
8	Siobhan Karam / Kevin O'Keefe	Canada	138.57	4	30.44	7	45.25	11	62.88
9	Phillipa Towler-Green / Phillip Poole	United Kingdom	133.24	11	24.95	10	39.06	8	69.23
10	Christina Chitwood / Mark Hanretty	United Kingdom	132.03	9	25.55	9	41.50	10	64.98
11	Alina Saprikina / Pavel Khimich	Ukraine	126.92	10	25.55	12	35.66	9	65.71
12	Leonie Krail / Oscar Peter	Switzerland	119.28	12	22.62	11	37.02	12	59.64
13	Christa-Elizabeth Goulakos / Bradley Yaeger	Greece	105.03	13	20.27	13	32.32	13	52.44
14	Nadine Ahmed / Bruce Porter	Azerbaijan	94.72	14	18.39	14	30.22	14	46.11
