= Figure skating at the 2010 Winter Olympics – Qualification =

The number of entries for the figure skating events at the Winter Olympics is determined by quotas set by the International Olympic Committee. A total of 148 quota spots were available to athletes to compete in the figure skating events at the 2010 Winter Olympics. There were 30 spots allotted each in men's and women's singles, 20 in pair skating, and 24 in ice dance. There is no individual athlete qualification to the Olympics; the choice of whom to send is at the discretion of each country's National Olympic Committee. Each National Olympic Committee could enter up to 18 skaters total, with a maximum of nine men or nine women. Japan and the United States ultimately earned three quota spots each in the men's event; Japan earned three quota spots in the women's event; China and Russia earned three quota spots each in the pairs' event; and Russia and the United States earned three quota spots each in the ice dance event.

== Qualification of nations ==
Countries were able to qualify entries to the 2010 Winter Olympics in two ways. Most spots were allocated based on the results of the 2009 World Figure Skating Championships. There, countries were able to qualify up to three entries in each discipline according to a predetermined system. The results of the 2009 World Championships determined 83 total spots: 24 entries each in men's and women's singles, 16 in pairs, and 19 in ice dance.

The remainder of the spots were filled at the 2009 Nebelhorn Trophy in late September 2009. Countries that had already earned an entry to the Olympics were not allowed to qualify additional entries at this final qualifying competition. However, if a country had earned two or three spots at the World Championships, but did not have two or three skaters, respectively, qualify for the free skate, then they were allowed to send a skater who did not reach the free segment at the World Championships to the Nebelhorn Trophy to qualify the remaining spot(s). Unlike at the World Championships, where countries could qualify more than one spot depending on the placement of their skater(s), at the Nebelhorn Trophy, countries could earn only one spot per discipline, regardless of ranking.

== Qualified nations ==
Number of qualified skaters or teams per nation
Nations	Men's singles	Women's singles	Pairs	Ice dance	Total skaters
Australia	0	1	0	0	1
Austria	1	1	0	0	2
Belgium	1	1	0	0	2
Canada	2	2	2	2	12
China	0	1	3	1	9
Czech Republic	2	0	0	1	4
Estonia	0	1	1	1	5
Finland	1	2	0	0	3
France	2	0	1	2	8
Georgia	0	1	0	1	3
Germany	1	1	2	1	8
Great Britain	0	1	1	2	7
Hungary	0	1	0	1	3
Israel	0	0	0	1	2
Italy	2	1	1	2	9
Japan	3	3	0	1	8
Kazakhstan	2	0	0	0	2
North Korea	1	0	0	0	1
Poland	1	1	1	0	4
Romania	1	0	0	0	1
Russia	2	2	3	3	16
Slovenia	1	1	0	0	2
Slovakia	0	1	0	0	1
South Korea	0	2	0	0	2
Spain	1	1	0	0	2
Sweden	1	0	0	0	1
Switzerland	1	1	1	0	4
Turkey	0	1	0	0	1
Ukraine	1	0	2	1	7
United States	3	2	2	3	15
Uzbekistan	0	1	0	0	1
Total: 32 NOCs	30	30	20 teams	23 teams	146

=== Men's singles ===
Twenty-four quota spots in the men's event were awarded based on the results at the 2009 World Figure Skating Championships. Six additional quota spots were made available at the 2009 Nebelhorn Trophy.

Qualifying nations in men's singles
Event	Skaters per NOC	Qualifying NOCs	Total skaters
2009 World Championships	3	Japan; United States	24
2009 World Championships	2	Canada; Czech Republic; France; Italy; Kazakhstan; Russia	24
2009 World Championships	1	Belgium; Poland; Slovenia; Spain; Sweden; Ukraine	24
2009 Nebelhorn Trophy	1	Austria; Finland; Germany; North Korea; Romania; Switzerland	6
Total			30

=== Women's singles ===
Twenty-four quota spots in the women's event were awarded based on the results at the 2009 World Championships. Georgia had originally qualified two quota spots at the 2009 World Championships, but relinquished one of them. That extra quota spot was made available at the 2009 Nebelhorn Trophy along with the other six spots originally allocated.

Israel qualified one quota spot after Tamar Katz finished in twelfth place at the 2009 Nebelhorn Trophy. However, the Olympic Committee of Israel declined to send Katz to the Winter Olympics, as she did not meet their prescribed standards. Their quota spot was relinquished to Australia; the Australian Olympic Committee chose to send Cheltzie Lee. Switzerland originally qualified two quota spots in the women's event, but the Swiss Olympic Association only sent one woman: Sarah Meier. Instead, the National Olympic Committee of the Republic of Uzbekistan elected to send Anastasia Gimazetdinova.

Qualifying nations in women's singles
Event	Skaters per NOC	Qualifying NOCs	Total skaters
2009 World Championships	3	Japan	22
2009 World Championships	2	Canada; Finland; ~~Georgia~~; South Korea; Russia; ~~Switzerland~~; United States	22
2009 World Championships	1	Estonia; Georgia; Germany; Great Britain; Italy; Poland; Slovakia; Switzerland; Turkey	22
2009 Nebelhorn Trophy	1	Australia; Austria; Belgium; China; Hungary; ~~Israel~~; Slovenia; Spain; Uzbekistan	8
Total			30

=== Pairs ===
Sixteen quota spots in the pairs event were awarded based on the results at the 2009 World Championships. Four additional quota spots were made available at the 2009 Nebelhorn Trophy.

Qualifying nations in pairs
Event	Teams per NOC	Qualifying NOCs	Total teams
2009 World Championships	3	China; Russia	16
2009 World Championships	2	Canada; Germany; Ukraine; United States	16
2009 World Championships	1	France; Great Britain	16
2009 Nebelhorn Trophy	1	Estonia; Italy; Poland; Switzerland	4
Total			20

=== Ice dance ===
Nineteen quota spots in the ice dance event were awarded based on the results at the 2009 World Championships. Lithuania had originally qualified one quota spot at the 2009 World Championships; however they relinquished that spot when Katherine Copely was unable to secure Lithuanian citizenship. The extra quota spot was made available at the 2009 Nebelhorn Trophy along with the other four spots originally allocated.

Qualifying nations in ice dance
Event	Teams per NOC	Qualifying NOCs	Total teams
2009 World Championships	3	Russia; United States	18
2009 World Championships	2	Canada; France; Great Britain; Italy	18
2009 World Championships	1	Germany; Israel; Japan; ~~Lithuania~~; Ukraine	18
2009 Nebelhorn Trophy	1	China; Czech Republic; Estonia; Georgia; Hungary	5
Total			23

=== Top three NOCs on waitlist per discipline ===
If a country rejected a quota spot, then the additional quota became available. A country could be eligible for one quota spot per event in the reallocation process. The following list was compiled after the remaining spots were allocated at the 2009 Nebelhorn Trophy. No quota spots were vacated after the Nebelhorn Trophy.

Quota spot waitlist
Men's singles	Women's singles	Pairs	Ice dance
Belarus; Estonia; Great Britain	Czech Republic; Uzbekistan; Australia	North Korea; Chinese Taipei; Greece	Greece
