= Figure skating at the 2010 Winter Olympics – Pair skating =

Pair skating at the XXI Olympic Winter Games
- Venue: Pacific Coliseum; Vancouver, Canada
- Dates: 14–15 February 2010
- Competitors: 20 teams from 12 nations
- Winning score: 216.57 points

Medalists
1st place, gold medalist(s)		Shen Xue and Zhao Hongbo	China
2nd place, silver medalist(s)		Pang Qing and Tong Jian	China
3rd place, bronze medalist(s)		Aljona Savchenko and Robin Szolkowy	Germany

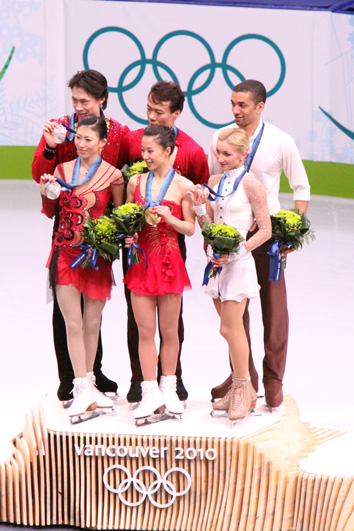
The medalists from the pairs' event at the 2010 Winter Olympics (from left to right): Pang Qing and Tong Jian of China (silver); Shen Xue and Zhao Hongbo of China (gold); and Aljona Savchenko and Robin Szolkowy of Germany (bronze)

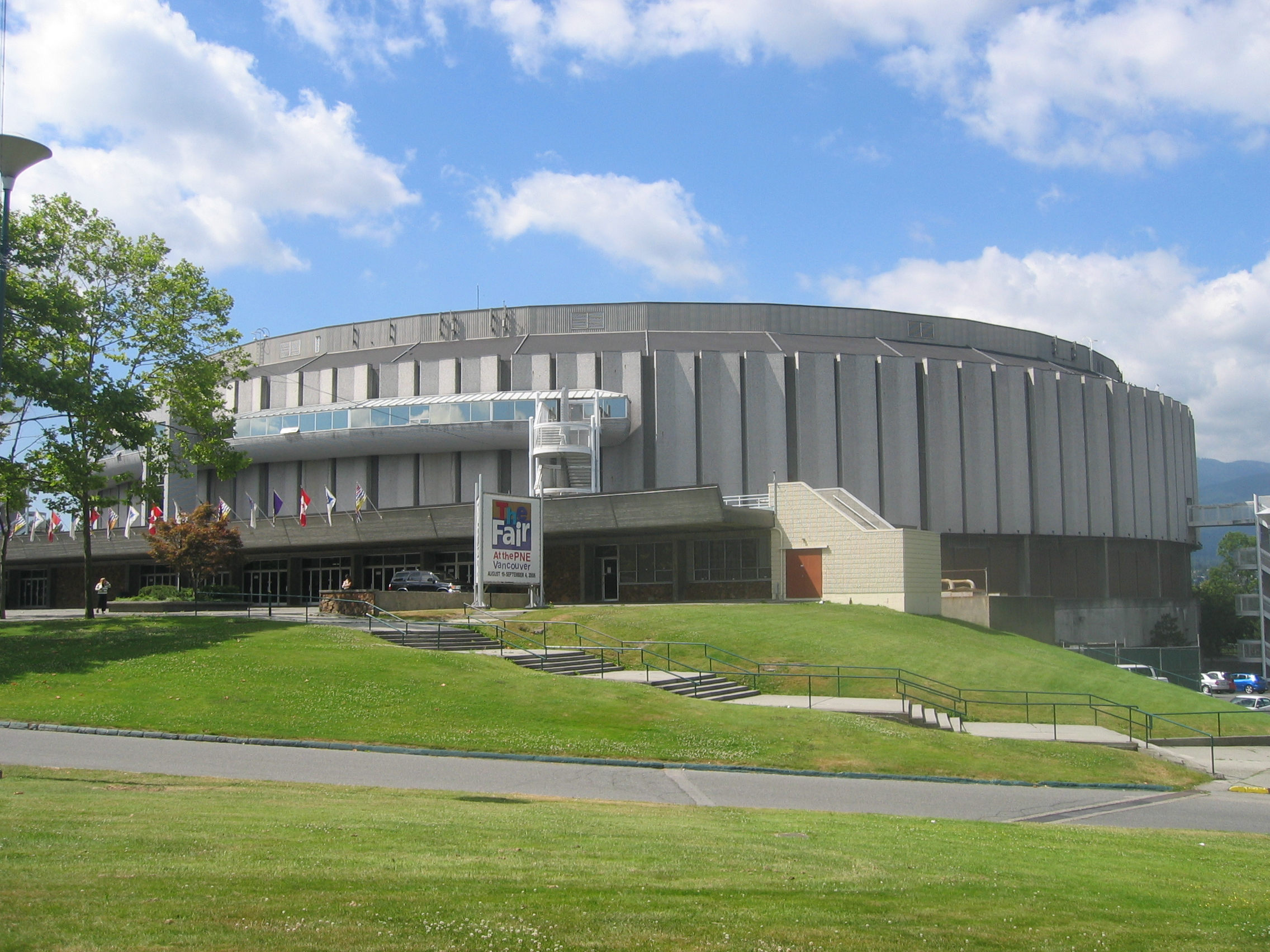
The figure skating events at the 2010 Winter Olympics were held at the Pacific Coliseum in Vancouver, Canada.

The pairs figure skating competition at the 2010 Winter Olympics was held from 14 to 15 February 2010 at the Pacific Coliseum in Vancouver, Canada, and featured 20 teams from 12 different nations. Shen Xue and Zhao Hongbo of China, two-time bronze medalists from the 2002 and 2006 Winter Olympics, won the gold, while Pang Qing and Tong Jian, also of China, won the silver, and Aljona Savchenko and Robin Szolkowy of Germany won the bronze. In addition to their gold and silver medals, both Chinese teams set new world record scores: Shen and Zhao in the short program and overall total, and Pang and Tong in the free skating. This marked the first time since 1960 that a Soviet or Russian team did not win the pairs' event at the Winter Olympics.

== Background ==
The pair skating event was one of four figure skating competitions contested at the 2010 Winter Olympics in Vancouver, British Columbia, in Canada. It was held at the Pacific Coliseum over two nights: the short program took place on 14 February 2010 and the free skating on 15 February 2010. The competition featured 20 teams representing 12 nations. Shen Xue and Zhao Hongbo of China were considered the favorites to win the gold medals. Shen and Zhao had won bronze medals at the 2002 and 2006 Winter Olympics, and were three-time world champions, three-time Four Continents champions, six-time Grand Prix of Figure Skating Final champions, and eight-time Chinese national champions. They had retired after the 2007 World Championships, after which they got married, but they returned to competition in 2009 with the intention of competing at the 2010 Winter Olympics. Shen and Zhao were undefeated since returning to competition and held the world record scores in both the short program and overall total. They had also held the record score in the free skate until Yuko Kavaguti and Alexander Smirnov of Russia beat that score at the 2010 European Championships. Their strongest competition was expected to be Aljona Savchenko and Robin Szolkowy of Germany. Savchenko and Szolkowy were two-time world champions, three-time European champions, and six-time German national champions.

== Qualification ==
There is no individual athlete qualification to the Olympics; the choice of whom to send is at the discretion of each country's National Olympic Committee (NOC). Sixteen quota spots in the pairs' event were awarded based on the results at the 2009 World Figure Skating Championships. Four additional quota spots were made available at the 2009 Nebelhorn Trophy.

Qualifying nations in pairs
Event	Teams per NOC	Qualifying NOCs	Total teams
2009 World Championships	3	China; Russia	16
2009 World Championships	2	Canada; Germany; Ukraine; United States	16
2009 World Championships	1	France; Great Britain	16
2009 Nebelhorn Trophy	1	Estonia; Italy; Poland; Switzerland	4
Total			20

== Required performance elements ==
Couples competing in pair skating performed their short programs on 14 February. Lasting no more than 2 minutes 50 seconds, the short program had to include the following elements: one hand-to-hand lift, one double or triple twist lift, one double or triple throw jump, one double or triple solo jump, one solo spin combination with a change of foot, one pair spin combination with a change of foot, one death spiral, and a step sequence.

After completing the short program, all twenty couples advanced to the free skating, which was performed on 15 February. Lasting 4 minutes 30 seconds (+/− 10 seconds), the free skate had to include the following elements: three pair lifts, two twist lifts, two different throw jumps, one solo jump, one jump combination or sequence, one solo spin combination, one pair spin combination, one death spiral, and a spiral sequence.

== Judging ==
Skaters were judged according to the required technical elements of their program (such as jumps and spins), as well as the overall presentation of their program, based on five program components (skating skills, transitions/linking footwork and movement, performance/execution, choreography/composition, and musical interpretation). Each technical element in a figure skating performance was assigned a predetermined base point value and scored by a panel of nine judges on a scale from −3 to +3 based on the quality of its execution. Each Grade of Execution (GOE) from –3 to +3 was assigned a value as indicated on the Scale of Values. For example, a triple Axel was worth a base value of 8.20 points, and a GOE of +3 was worth 3.00 points, so a triple Axel with a GOE of +3 earned 11.20 points. The judging panel's GOE for each element was determined by calculating the trimmed mean (the average after discarding the highest and lowest scores). The panel's scores for all elements were added together to generate a Total Elements Score. At the same time, the judges evaluated each performance based on the five aforementioned program components and assigned each a score from 0.25 to 10 in 0.25-point increments. The judging panel's final score for each program component was also determined by calculating the trimmed mean. Those scores were then multiplied by the factor shown on the chart below; the results were added together to generate a total Program Component Score.

Program component factoring
Discipline	Short program	Free skate
Pairs	0.80	1.60

Deductions were applied for certain violations, such as time infractions or falls. The Total Elements Score and Program Component Score were then added together, minus any deductions, to generate a final performance score for each skater or team.

== Results ==
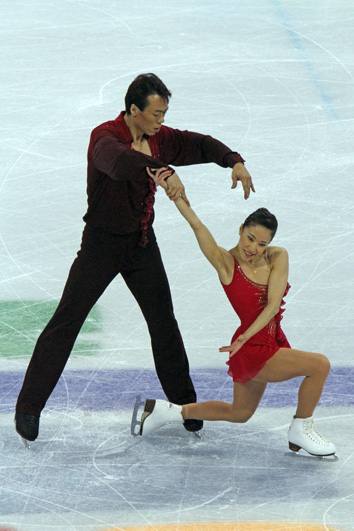
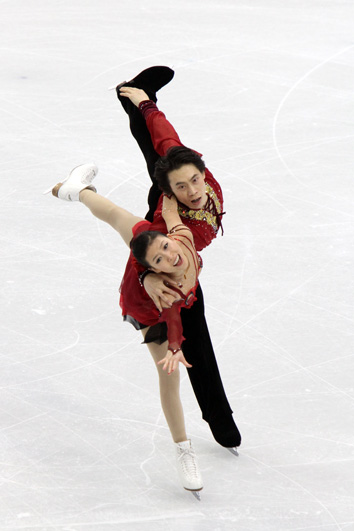
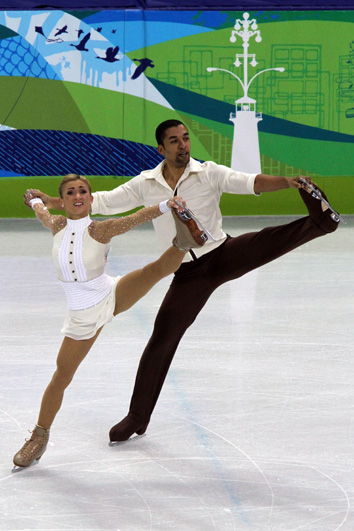
The gold, silver, and bronze medalists from the pairs event at the 2010 Winter Olympics (from left to right):
Shen Xue and Zhao Hongbo of China (gold); Pang Qing and Tong Jian of China (silver); and Aljona Savchenko and Robin Szolkowy of Germany (bronze)

Code key

- TSS – Total Segment Score
- TES – Total Elements Score
- PCS – Program Component Score
- SS – Skating skills
- TR – Transitions
- PE – Performance
- CH – Choreography
- IN – Musical interpretation
- DED – Deductions

=== Short program ===
The pairs short program was held on 14 February 2010. Shen Xue and Zhao Hongbo of China, performing to "Who Wants to Live Forever" by Queen, finished in first place, setting a new world record with a score of 76.66. They beat the previous record, which had been set by them at the 2009–10 Grand Prix of Figure Skating Final. At 31 (Shen) and 36 (Zhao), they were the oldest skaters at the Olympics. Their performance featured side-by-side triple toe loops and a triple twist lift, and, according to Nancy Armour of the Associated Press, "oozed elegance". They skated as if they were one person, with perfect timing and unity. Their score was a mere 0.70 points ahead of Aljona Savchenko and Robin Szolkowy of Germany. Yuko Kavaguti and Alexander Smirnov of Russia finished in third place, while Pang Qing and Tong Jian of China finished fourth, and Zhang Dan and Zhang Hao, also of China, finished fifth.

Pairs short program results
Pl.	Skater	Nation	TSS	TES	PCS	SS	TR	PE	CH	IN	DED
1	Shen Xue; Zhao Hongbo	China	76.66	42.42	34.24	8.60	8.30	8.70	8.60	8.60	0.00
2	Aljona Savchenko; Robin Szolkowy	Germany	75.96	42.24	33.72	8.40	8.25	8.55	8.50	8.45	0.00
3	Yuko Kavaguti; Alexander Smirnov	Russia	74.16	40.92	33.24	8.25	8.10	8.45	8.30	8.45	0.00
4	Pang Qing; Tong Jian	China	71.50	39.90	32.60	8.25	7.90	8.25	8.15	8.20	1.00
5	Zhang Dan; Zhang Hao	China	71.28	41.08	30.20	7.70	7.40	7.55	7.65	7.45	0.00
6	Jessica Dubé; Bryce Davison	Canada	65.36	36.16	30.20	7.60	7.30	7.60	7.65	7.60	1.00
7	Anabelle Langlois; Cody Hay	Canada	64.20	37.60	26.60	6.70	6.30	6.75	6.80	6.70	0.00
8	Maria Mukhortova; Maxim Trankov	Russia	63.44	34.24	30.20	7.65	7.40	7.50	7.65	7.55	1.00
9	Tatiana Volosozhar; Stanislav Morozov	Ukraine	62.14	34.62	27.52	7.05	6.70	6.85	7.00	6.80	0.00
10	Amanda Evora; Mark Ladwig	United States	57.86	33.10	24.76	6.30	5.95	6.35	6.20	6.15	0.00
11	Nicole Della Monica; Yannick Kocon	Italy	56.82	31.90	24.92	6.40	6.10	6.15	6.40	6.10	0.00
12	Vera Bazarova; Yuri Larionov	Russia	56.54	31.74	24.80	6.25	5.90	6.30	6.35	6.20	0.00
13	Anaïs Morand; Antoine Dorsaz	Switzerland	55.34	32.70	22.64	5.85	5.40	5.80	5.75	5.50	0.00
14	Caydee Denney; Jeremy Barrett	United States	53.26	29.86	23.40	6.00	5.60	5.95	5.95	5.75	0.00
15	Vanessa James; Yannick Bonheur	France	51.16	28.56	22.60	5.75	5.40	5.65	5.80	5.65	0.00
16	Stacey Kemp; David King	Great Britain	48.28	27.72	20.56	5.25	4.90	5.25	5.15	5.15	0.00
17	Maylin Hausch; Daniel Wende	Germany	45.46	23.54	21.92	5.60	5.25	5.35	5.55	5.65	0.00
18	Maria Sergejeva; Ilja Glebov	Estonia	42.18	23.70	19.48	5.15	4.60	4.85	5.00	4.75	1.00
19	Ekaterina Kostenko; Roman Talan	Ukraine	39.54	21.74	18.80	4.85	4.50	4.65	4.85	4.65	1.00
20	Joanna Sulej; Mateusz Chruściński	Poland	39.30	23.26	18.04	4.75	4.25	4.40	4.55	4.60	2.00

=== Free skating ===
The pairs free skate was held on 15 February 2010. Although Shen Xue and Zhao Hongbo finished second in the free skate, their total score of 216.57 was enough to secure the gold medals that had lured them out of retirement a year earlier. They finished more than three points ahead of Pang Qing and Tong Jian, who won the silver. Aljona Savchenko and Robin Szolkowy had a flawed free skate and finished in third place. Yuko Kavaguti and Alexander Smirnov finished in fourth place after a performance that Philip Hersh of The Los Angeles Times described as "messy from start to finish". This was the first time since 1960 that a Soviet or Russian team did not win the pairs' event at the Winter Olympics, and marked the first Olympic gold medal for China in figure skating.

Shen and Zhao's performance to Adagio in G minor by Tomaso Albinoni featured what Nancy Armour described as mesmerizing choreography and flawless throw jumps. Armour described their throw triple Salchow as "so massive, [Shen] ought to get frequent flier points". They finished their routine with a carry lift that circled half the ice, bringing the audience to a standing ovation before the music even concluded. However, their free skate still scored below that of Pang Qing and Tong Jian. Pang and Tong's routine, set to "The Impossible Dream" from Man of La Mancha, set a new world record in the free skate with 141.81.

Amanda Evora and Mark Ladwig of the United States finished in tenth place, while Caydee Denney and Jeremy Barrett, also of the United States, finished in thirteenth place. Evora and Ladwig's total score of 171.92 was the worst highest performance by an American pairs team in Olympic history, as was the aggregate finish of the two American pairs teams.

Pairs free skate results
Pl.	Skater	Nation	TSS	TES	PCS	SS	TR	PE	CH	IN	DED
1	Pang Qing; Tong Jian	China	141.81	70.53	71.28	8.90	8.70	9.00	8.90	9.05	0.00
2	Shen Xue; Zhao Hongbo	China	139.91	67.51	72.40	8.95	8.85	9.10	9.10	9.25	0.00
3	Aljona Savchenko; Robin Szolkowy	Germany	134.64	65.08	70.56	8.85	8.60	8.85	8.85	8.95	1.00
4	Zhang Dan; Zhang Hao	China	123.06	65.42	58.64	7.50	7.15	7.35	7.40	7.25	1.00
5	Maria Mukhortova; Maxim Trankov	Russia	122.35	61.27	62.08	7.80	7.55	7.80	7.85	7.80	1.00
6	Jessica Dubé; Bryce Davison	Canada	121.75	60.99	61.76	7.70	7.60	7.70	7.85	7.75	1.00
7	Yuko Kavaguti; Alexander Smirnov	Russia	120.61	57.13	64.48	8.05	7.85	8.05	8.10	8.25	1.00
8	Tatiana Volosozhar; Stanislav Morozov	Ukraine	119.64	64.64	56.00	7.15	6.75	7.05	7.05	7.00	1.00
9	Anabelle Langlois; Cody Hay	Canada	115.77	60.45	56.32	7.10	6.80	7.05	7.10	7.15	1.00
10	Amanda Evora; Mark Ladwig	United States	114.06	62.06	52.00	6.45	6.45	6.65	6.45	6.50	0.00
11	Vera Bazarova; Yuri Larionov	Russia	106.96	57.72	50.24	6.40	6.10	6.20	6.40	6.30	1.00
12	Caydee Denney; Jeremy Barrett	United States	105.07	56.27	48.80	6.20	5.85	6.25	6.15	6.05	0.00
13	Nicole Della Monica; Yannick Kocon	Italy	104.78	54.34	51.44	6.65	6.30	6.35	6.55	6.30	1.00
14	Vanessa James; Yannick Bonheur	France	93.94	48.34	45.60	5.90	5.45	5.75	5.75	5.65	0.00
15	Maylin Hausch; Daniel Wende	Germany	93.28	51.08	43.20	5.50	5.20	5.60	5.35	5.35	1.00
16	Stacey Kemp; David King	Great Britain	91.66	49.90	41.76	5.25	5.10	5.30	5.30	5.15	0.00
17	Anaïs Morand; Antoine Dorsaz	Switzerland	89.08	48.44	42.64	5.40	5.25	5.15	5.45	5.40	2.00
18	Joanna Sulej; Mateusz Chruściński	Poland	86.52	49.44	38.08	4.90	4.40	4.75	4.90	4.85	1.00
19	Maria Sergejeva; Ilja Glebov	Estonia	82.72	43.92	38.80	5.05	4.65	4.90	4.95	4.70	0.00
20	Ekaterina Kostenko; Roman Talan	Ukraine	81.44	45.52	35.92	4.65	4.20	4.65	4.50	4.45	0.00

=== Overall ===
Pairs results
Rank	Team	Nation	Total	SP		FS	
1st place, gold medalist(s)	Shen Xue; Zhao Hongbo	China	216.57	1	76.66	2	139.91
2nd place, silver medalist(s)	Pang Qing; Tong Jian	China	213.31	4	71.50	1	141.81
3rd place, bronze medalist(s)	Aljona Savchenko; Robin Szolkowy	Germany	210.60	2	75.96	3	134.64
4	Yuko Kavaguti; Alexander Smirnov	Russia	194.77	3	74.16	7	120.61
5	Zhang Dan; Zhang Hao	China	194.34	5	71.28	4	123.06
6	Jessica Dubé; Bryce Davison	Canada	187.11	6	65.36	6	121.75
7	Maria Mukhortova; Maxim Trankov	Russia	185.79	8	63.44	5	122.35
8	Tatiana Volosozhar; Stanislav Morozov	Ukraine	181.78	9	62.14	8	119.64
9	Anabelle Langlois; Cody Hay	Canada	179.97	7	64.20	9	15.77
10	Amanda Evora; Mark Ladwig	United States	171.92	10	57.86	10	114.06
11	Vera Bazarova; Yuri Larionov	Russia	163.50	12	56.54	11	106.96
12	Nicole Della Monica; Yannick Kocon	Italy	161.60	11	56.82	13	104.78
13	Caydee Denney; Jeremy Barrett	United States	158.33	14	53.26	12	105.07
14	Vanessa James; Yannick Bonheur	France	145.10	15	51.16	14	93.94
15	Anaïs Morand; Antoine Dorsaz	Switzerland	144.42	13	55.34	17	89.08
16	Stacey Kemp; David King	Great Britain	139.94	16	48.28	16	91.66
17	Maylin Hausch; Daniel Wende	Germany	138.74	17	45.46	15	93.28
18	Joanna Sulej; Mateusz Chruściński	Poland	125.82	20	39.30	18	86.52
19	Maria Sergejeva; Ilja Glebov	Estonia	124.90	18	42.18	19	82.72
20	Ekaterina Kostenko; Roman Talan	Ukraine	120.98	19	39.54	20	81.44

== Records ==
The following new record high scores were set during this competition.

Record high scores
Date	Skater	Segment	Score	Ref.
14 February	(China); Shen Xue; Zhao Hongbo	Short program	76.66	
15 February	(China); Pang Qing; Tong Jian	Free skating	141.81	
15 February	(China); Shen Xue; Zhao Hongbo	Total score	216.57	

== Works cited ==
- "Special Regulations & Technical Rules – Single & Pair Skating and Ice Dance 2008" (PDF). International Skating Union. Archived (PDF) from the original on 16 October 2021.
