= 2009 Nebelhorn Trophy =

Figure skating competition

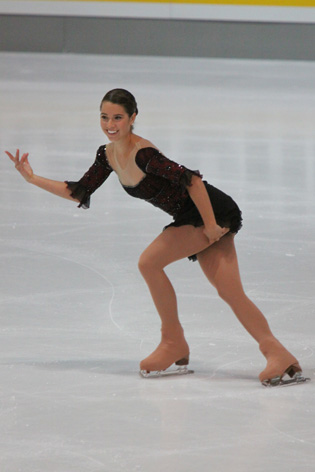
- Alissa Czisny at the 2009 Nebelhorn Trophy
- Type: Senior International
- Date: September 23 – 26
- Season: 2009–10
- Location: Oberstdorf
- Host: Deutsche Eislauf-Union
- Venue: Eislaufzentrum Oberstdorf

Champions
- Men's singles: (Switzerland) Stéphane Lambiel
- Ladies' singles: (United States) Alissa Czisny
- Pairs: (Germany) Aliona Savchenko / Robin Szolkowy
- Ice dance: (United States) Meryl Davis / Charlie White
- Previous: 2008 Nebelhorn Trophy
- Next: 2010 Nebelhorn Trophy

The 2009 Nebelhorn Trophy was held between September 23 and 26, 2009 in Oberstdorf, Germany. It served as the final Olympic qualifier to the 2010 Winter Olympics. Skaters competed in the disciplines of men's singles, ladies' singles, pair skating, and ice dance. The compulsory dance was the Tango Romantica.

== Olympic qualification ==
This competition served as the final Olympic qualifier to the 2010 Winter Olympics. Eligible skaters qualified a spot to the Olympics for their country in order of their placement at this competition; there was no individual skater qualification. Countries who had already qualified a spot to the Olympics at the 2009 World Figure Skating Championships were not eligible to qualify more spots here, and their results were discounted from the overall results when allotting spots to countries. Unlike at the World Championships, where countries could qualify more than one spot depending on the placement of the skater, at this competition, countries who qualified were allotted only one spot to the Olympics, regardless of placement.

There were six Olympic spots available in men's singles, seven in ladies' singles, four in pairs, and five in ice dance. There were originally only six spots available in the ladies event; however, Georgia gave up one of its ladies spots before the competition, which allowed a seventh spot to become available.

If a country later declined to use one or more of its qualified spots, the vacated spot was awarded using the results of the Nebelhorn Trophy in descending order of placement.

=== Qualified countries ===
The following countries qualified an entry to the Olympics. In the event that a country chooses not to fill a spot, the next alternate in line is allotted the spot.

Men	Ladies	Pairs	Ice dance
Switzerland; Austria; Germany; North Korea; Romania; Finland	China; Hungary; Slovenia; Austria; Spain; Belgium; Israel*	Switzerland; Estonia; Poland; Italy	China; Czech Republic; Hungary; Estonia; Georgia
First Three Alternates
Belarus; Estonia; United Kingdom	Czech Republic; Uzbekistan; Australia	North Korea; Chinese Taipei; Greece	Greece

- Georgia, which had earned two spots in the ladies event at the World Championships, informed the ISU before the competition that they would not be filling their second spot. Therefore, Israel qualified an entrant here.

== Schedule ==
(UTC+2)

24/09/2009

- 09:45 Ice dance: Compulsory dance
- 12:10 Men: Short program
- 17:10 Pairs: Short program
- 20:30 Ice dance: Original dance

25/09/2009

- 08:30 Ladies: Short program
- 13:50 Men: Free skating
- 19:45 Pairs: Free skating

26/09/2009

- 08:54 Ladies: Free skating
- 15:00 Ice dance: Free dance

== Results ==
=== Men ===
Rank	Name	Nation	Total points	SP		FS	
1	Stéphane Lambiel	Switzerland	232.36	1	77.45	1	154.91
2	Ivan Tretiakov	Russia	206.23	5	67.05	2	139.18
3	Michal Březina	Czech Republic	205.34	2	73.23	3	132.11
4	Ryan Bradley	United States	195.68	3	68.18	6	127.50
5	Viktor Pfeifer	Austria	194.66	6	65.32	5	129.34
6	Yannick Ponsero	France	187.56	13	55.50	4	132.06
7	Akio Sasaki	Japan	179.16	7	64.30	9	114.86
8	Stefan Lindemann	Germany	178.88	8	63.95	8	114.93
9	Joey Russell	Canada	174.91	4	67.80	13	107.11
10	Maciej Cieplucha	Poland	173.42	12	56.35	7	117.07
11	Ri Song Chol	North Korea	172.14	9	60.41	10	111.73
12	Anton Kovalevski	Ukraine	168.13	11	57.23	11	110.90
13	Zoltán Kelemen	Romania	164.72	15	54.49	12	110.23
14	Ari-Pekka Nurmenkari	Finland	164.67	10	57.68	14	106.99
15	Alexandr Kazakov	Belarus	159.45	14	55.38	17	104.07
16	Viktor Romanenkov	Estonia	154.61	19	51.00	18	103.61
17	Matthew Parr	United Kingdom	154.52	21	49.16	15	105.36
18	Gregor Urbas	Slovenia	151.38	23	46.59	16	104.79
19	Wu Jialiang	China	151.35	18	51.23	19	100.12
20	Kim Min-seok	South Korea	147.23	17	54.19	22	93.04
21	Peter Reitmayer	Slovakia	144.51	16	54.45	23	90.06
22	Tigran Vardanjan	Hungary	139.94	24	46.49	21	93.45
23	Kevin Alves	Brazil	138.16	20	50.82	24	87.34
24	Stephen Li-Chung Kuo	Chinese Taipei	137.01	27	43.00	20	94.01
25	Maxim Shipov	Israel	131.37	25	45.89	25	85.48
26	Boris Martinec	Croatia	124.14	22	46.63	27	77.51
27	Kutay Eryoldas	Turkey	117.60	26	45.32	29	72.28
28	Damjan Ostojič	Bosnia and Herzegovina	111.97	32	32.70	26	79.27
29	Justin Pietersen	South Africa	109.71	29	36.81	28	72.90
30	Luis Hernández	Mexico	105.70	28	37.64	31	68.06
31	Robert McNamara	Australia	104.79	31	34.96	30	69.83
32	Pierre Balian	Armenia	86.42	30	35.68	32	50.74
WD	Fedor Andreev	Azerbaijan					

=== Ladies ===
Rank	Name	Nation	Total points	SP		FS	
1	Alissa Czisny	United States	151.40	1	60.38	6	91.02
2	Kiira Korpi	Finland	150.01	2	58.34	4	91.67
3	Liu Yan	China	147.87	5	48.18	1	99.69
4	Júlia Sebestyén	Hungary	146.76	3	53.68	2	93.08
5	Teodora Poštič	Slovenia	139.97	6	47.82	3	92.15
6	Miriam Ziegler	Austria	132.38	4	52.54	11	79.84
7	Sarah Hecken	Germany	130.73	7	47.58	8	83.15
8	Sonia Lafuente	Spain	130.30	16	39.10	5	91.20
9	Jelena Glebova	Estonia	129.33	9	46.02	7	83.31
10	Katharina Häcker	Germany	126.24	8	47.10	12	79.14
11	Isabelle Pieman	Belgium	123.74	12	43.36	9	80.38
12	Tamar Katz	Israel	121.40	10	45.24	14	76.16
13	Nella Simaová	Czech Republic	119.60	15	41.60	13	78.00
14	Anastasia Gimazetdinova	Uzbekistan	117.93	18	38.08	10	79.85
15	Cheltzie Lee	Australia	113.14	13	42.34	16	70.80
16	Gwendoline Didier	France	112.07	11	43.54	21	68.53
17	Chaochih Liu	Chinese Taipei	111.04	14	41.72	20	69.32
18	Joshi Helgesson	Sweden	109.17	25	34.72	15	74.45
19	Manouk Gijsman	Netherlands	108.04	20	37.28	17	70.76
20	Karina Johnson	Denmark	106.81	19	37.32	19	69.49
21	Eleonora Vinnichenko	Ukraine	102.75	26	32.32	18	70.43
22	Ana Cecilia Cantu	Mexico	102.63	22	35.84	22	66.79
23	Choi Ji-eun	South Korea	101.22	17	39.08	24	62.14
24	Fleur Maxwell	Luxembourg	99.79	23	35.20	23	64.59
25	Megan Williams Stewart	Puerto Rico	98.73	21	37.20	25	61.53
26	Lejeanne Marais	South Africa	96.12	24	34.86	26	61.26
27	Mericien Venzon	Philippines	88.78	27	31.66	28	57.12
28	Alexandra Rout	New Zealand	87.18	30	29.32	27	57.86
29	Laura Kean	United Kingdom	84.16	28	30.64	29	53.52
30	Marina Seeh	Serbia	82.05	29	30.16	30	51.89
31	Emma Hagieva	Azerbaijan	79.53	31	28.98	31	50.55
32	Clara Peters	Ireland	69.29	32	28.04	33	41.25
33	Alessia Baldo	Brazil	64.85	33	21.44	32	43.41
WD	Ariana Tarrado Ribes	Andorra					
WD	Ani Vardanyan	Armenia					

=== Pairs ===
Rank	Name	Nation	Total points	SP		FS	
1	Aliona Savchenko / Robin Szolkowy	Germany	185.99	1	72.80	1	113.19
2	Tatiana Volosozhar / Stanislav Morozov	Ukraine	165.75	2	59.46	2	106.29
3	Anabelle Langlois / Cody Hay	Canada	155.61	3	57.48	5	98.13
4	Brooke Castile / Benjamin Okolski	United States	151.95	4	51.70	3	100.25
5	Anaïs Morand / Antoine Dorsaz	Switzerland	151.49	5	51.32	4	100.17
6	Vanessa James / Yannick Bonheur	France	145.50	8	47.74	6	97.76
7	Maylin Hausch / Daniel Wende	Germany	141.96	6	49.30	8	92.66
8	Stacey Kemp / David King	United Kingdom	139.02	11	45.04	7	93.98
9	Maria Sergejeva / Ilja Glebov	Estonia	134.56	9	47.10	10	87.46
10	Joanna Sulej / Mateusz Chruściński	Poland	131.29	12	40.84	9	90.45
11	Marika Zanforlin / Federico Degli Esposti	Italy	120.46	10	46.46	13	74.00
12	Sung Mi Hyang / Jong Yong Hyok	North Korea	119.01	13	39.18	11	79.83
13	Amanda Sunyoto-Yang / Darryll Sulindro-Yang	Chinese Taipei	113.66	14	38.18	12	75.48
14	Jessica Crenshaw / Chad Tsagris	Greece	108.98	16	35.78	14	73.20
15	Gabriela Čermanová / Martin Hanulák	Slovakia	105.35	15	36.88	15	68.47
16	Nicole Gurny / Martin Liebers	Germany	102.05	17	35.52	16	66.53
17	Marina Aganina / Dmitri Zobnin	Uzbekistan	95.88	18	33.92	17	61.96
WD	Ksenia Krasilnikova / Konstantin Bezmaternikh	Russia		7	48.44		

=== Ice dance ===
Rank	Name	Nation	Total points	CD		OD		FD	
1	Meryl Davis / Charlie White	United States	200.46	1	37.62	1	62.08	1	100.76
2	Alexandra Zaretski / Roman Zaretski	Israel	169.59	2	32.34	2	52.71	2	84.54
3	Katherine Copely / Deividas Stagniūnas	Lithuania	162.02	4	31.23	3	48.09	3	82.70
4	Ekaterina Riazanova / Ilia Tkachenko	Russia	158.88	3	31.64	4	47.91	4	79.33
5	Huang Xintong / Zheng Xun	China	149.85	6	30.16	8	43.67	5	76.02
6	Lucie Myslivečková / Matěj Novák	Czech Republic	148.47	8	28.85	5	45.64	7	73.98
7	Nóra Hoffmann / Maxim Zavozin	Hungary	148.43	5	31.20	10	42.84	6	74.39
8	Christina Chitwood / Mark Hanretty	United Kingdom	146.22	7	29.02	6	45.06	9	72.14
9	Caitlin Mallory / Kristian Rand	Estonia	143.49	9	27.46	11	42.34	8	73.69
10	Isabella Pajardi / Stefano Caruso	Italy	140.29	11	25.53	9	43.52	10	71.24
11	Carolina Hermann / Daniel Hermann	Germany	136.06	10	26.13	7	44.73	12	65.20
12	Allison Lynn Reed / Otar Japaridze	Georgia	130.76	14	23.12	12	41.87	11	65.77
13	Kira Geil / Dmitri Matsjuk	Austria	130.03	12	25.42	13	41.06	14	63.55
14	Tanja Kolbe / Sascha Rabe	Germany	128.94	13	24.00	14	40.27	13	64.67
15	Nikki Georgiadis / Graham Hockley	Greece	113.01	15	19.16	15	36.03	15	57.82
16	Henna Lindholm / Ossi Kanervo	Finland	96.56	16	19.04	16	24.95	16	52.57
WD	Danielle O'Brien / Gregory Merriman	Australia							

== See also ==
- 2005 Karl Schäfer Memorial, the final qualifying competition to the 2006 Winter Olympics
