= Faye Brookes =

English actress (born 1987)

Faye Lewis
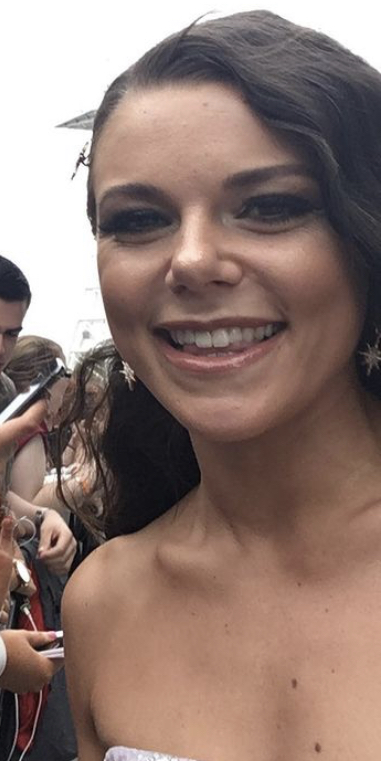
- Brookes in 2019
- Born: Faye Alicia Brookes; 3 September 1987 (age 39); Stretford, Trafford, England
- Occupation: Actress
- Years active: 2011–present
- Spouse: Iwan Lewis (m. 2023)

Faye Alicia Brookes (born 3 September 1987) is an English actress. She is known for playing Kate Connor on the ITV soap opera Coronation Street. In 2021, she competed in the thirteenth series of Dancing on Ice, where she finished in second place.

== Early life ==
Brookes was born on 3 September 1987 in Stretford, Trafford. Whilst growing up, Brookes attended Flixton Junior School and Knutsford High School. She then expressed an interest in musical theatre, initially studying Musical Theatre at Pendleton College from 2004 onwards, before later attending Guildford School of Acting. She graduated in 2010, after completing a Bachelor of Arts degree in Musical Theatre and being awarded the Principal’s Choice Award.

== Career ==
Prior to appearing on television, Brookes starred in various theatre productions, including Grease, Shrek, Legally Blonde and The Sound of Music. In mid-2015, it was announced that the Connor family in Coronation Street was being extended. The family first appeared in the street in 2006 and have featured in many storylines. Brookes was cast as Kate Connor and after her on-screen brother Aidan Connor made his first appearance, played by The X Factor winner Shayne Ward, Brookes first appeared as Kate in October 2015. She won Best Newcomer for her portrayal of Kate in January 2017 at the 22nd National Television Awards. In April 2019, it was announced that Brookes had decided to leave Coronation Street. Her final scenes aired later in 2019.

On 24 September 2020, Brookes was announced as a contestant for the 2021 series of Dancing on Ice. Brookes was originally partnered with Hamish Gaman; however, after he withdrew due to an injury in week 6, Brookes was re-partnered with Matt Evers. She finished the competition in second place.

In November 2021, it was announced that in 2022 Brookes would take over as Roxie Hart in the UK tour of the musical Chicago. She joined the cast of The Sound of Music from 2025 to 2026.

== Personal life ==
In 2012, while appearing in a production of Legally Blonde, Brookes met Gareth Gates, who was playing her character's boyfriend. The pair began a relationship, and became engaged before separating in 2018. While together, the pair set up a stage school, Fates Academy.

In August 2023, Brookes married Legally Blonde co-star Iwan Lewis. She had known him 13 years prior, when Lewis joked to Brookes' mother that he would end up marrying her.

== Filmography ==
| Year | Title | Role | Notes |
|---|---|---|---|
| 2013 | Atlantis | Helena | 1 episode |
| 2014 | Our Zoo | Frankie | 1 episode |
| 2015–2019 | Coronation Street | Kate Connor | Regular role |
| 2016 | The Chase | Herself | Celebrity special |
| 2018 | Coronation Street's DNA Secrets | Herself | One-off documentary |
| 2021 | Dancing on Ice | Herself | Contestant |
| 2022 | Celebrity Bridge of Lies | Herself | Celebrity Contestant |
| 2026 | Girl Troop vs Aliens | June Hopewell | 8 episodes |

== Stage ==
| Year | Title | Role | Notes |
|---|---|---|---|
| 2010–2011 | Grease | Frenchy and Sandy | Piccadilly Theatre |
| 2011–2012 | Legally Blonde | Elle Woods | UK tour |
| 2013 | The Sound of Music | Liesl Von Trapp | Regent's Park Theatre |
| 2013–2014 | That Day We Sang | Ann/Edna | Royal Exchange Theatre |
| 2014–2015 | Shrek: The Musical | Princess Fiona | UK tour |
| 2021–2022, 2024–2025 | Chicago | Roxie Hart | UK tours |
| 2023 | Strictly Ballroom | Fran | UK tour |
| 2024 | Constellations | Marianne | The Barn Theatre |
| 2025–2026 | The Sound of Music | Elsa Schraeder | Curve Theatre |

== Awards and nominations ==
| Year | Award | Category | Result | Ref. |
|---|---|---|---|---|
| 2016 | TV Choice Awards | Best Soap Newcomer | Nominated | |
| 2016 | Inside Soap Awards | Sexiest Female | Nominated | |
| 2017 | 22nd National Television Awards | Newcomer | Won | |
| 2017 | Digital Spy Reader Awards | Best Soap Relationship (with Bhavna Limbachia) | Second | |
| 2018 | The British Soap Awards | Best On-Screen Partnership (with Limbachia) | Nominated | |
| 2018 | Inside Soap Awards | Best Partnership (with Limbachia) | Nominated | |
| 2018 | I Talk Telly Awards | Best Soap Partnership (with Limbachia) | Nominated | |
