= Dancing on Ice series 13 =

Thirteenth series of Dancing on Ice

Dancing on Ice
- Series 13
- Presented by: Phillip Schofield; Holly Willoughby
- Judges: Ashley Banjo; John Barrowman; Christopher Dean; Jayne Torvill
- Celebrity winner: Sonny Jay
- Professional winner: Angela Egan
- No. of episodes: 8

Release
- Original network: ITV
- Original release: 17 January – 14 March 2021

Series chronology
- ← Previous; Series 12 Next → Series 14

The thirteenth series of Dancing on Ice debuted on ITV on 17 January 2021. During the finale of the twelfth series, it was announced that Dancing on Ice had been renewed for another series. The series was once again filmed in the purpose-built studio at Bovingdon Airfield, which had been set up for the tenth series. Phillip Schofield and Holly Willoughby returned as hosts, while Ashley Banjo, John Barrowman, Christopher Dean, and Jayne Torvill returned as judges.

Due to the COVID-19 pandemic, the series was filmed without a live audience for the first time in the show's history, while the judges were separated by perspex screens. The celebrities and their professional partners formed bubbles in order to work together safely.

This series experienced numerous withdrawals. Denise van Outen, Billie Shepherd, and Jason Donovan were forced to withdraw from the series after suffering injuries, while Rufus Hound and Joe-Warren Plant both withdrew after testing positive for COVID-19. Amy Tinkler and Matt Richardson joined the competition as replacement contestants in weeks 3 and 4, respectively.

On 15 February 2021, ITV announced that they would postpone the sixth live show scheduled for 21 February in order to give the remaining contestants sufficient time to recover from any injuries, stating that "The welfare of all of those involved is important to us and we felt it prudent to take a week's break at this juncture". The episode was instead replaced with a pre-recorded special celebrating the most memorable moments in the show's history entitled Dancing on Ice: The Greatest Show on Ice. The live shows resumed on 28 February.

On 26 February 2021, ITV announced that the current series would end a week earlier than originally planned, taking the number of live shows to eight instead of the usual 10.

Sonny Jay and Angela Egan were announced as the winners on 14 March 2021.

== Professional skaters ==
On 24 June 2020, it was announced that Alex Murphy had not been re-contracted for the upcoming series, and on 19 July 2020, that Brianne Delcourt would be leaving the show to spend more time with her husband, Kevin Kilbane, with whom she partnered last series. On 30 August 2020, it was announced that Alexander Demetriou and Carlotta Edwards would also not be returning, although Demetriou did still appear in some of the group numbers. On 7 October 2020, it was announced that Jess Hatfield, Oscar Peter, and Tom Naylor would not be returning either. They were replaced by returning professionals Andy Buchanan and Robin Johnstone, and new professionals Angela Egan, Klabera Komini, and Yebin Mok, along with Joe Johnson and Karina Manta who led the professional group routines. Vicky Ogden, also a returning professional, joined the cast in week 4 when Matt Richardson entered the competition, but did not take part in the pre-recorded group routines. On 16 February 2021, it was announced that Hamish Gaman had been forced to withdraw from the competition after snapping a tendon in his hand. Therefore, Faye Brookes was re-partnered with Matt Evers.

== Couples ==
On 20 September 2020, Myleene Klass was announced as the first celebrity to be participating in the series. More celebrities were revealed in the following days before the line-up was concluded on 4 October. On 26 January 2021, Denise van Outen was forced to withdraw from the competition after suffering three bone fractures and partially dislocating her shoulder. Van Outen was replaced by former Olympic artistic gymnast Amy Tinkler, who made her debut in the competition in week 3. Former Olympic skier and broadcaster Graham Bell was originally partnered with Yebin Mok; however, after Mok sustained an injury before their first performance, Bell was re-partnered with Karina Manta. On 3 February 2021, it was announced that Rufus Hound had tested positive for COVID-19 and was forced to withdraw from the competition. He was replaced by comedian and television presenter Matt Richardson, who made his debut in the competition in week 4. On 6 February 2021, Billie Shepherd was forced to withdraw from the competition after suffering a head injury in training. On 12 February 2021, it was announced that Joe-Warren Plant had to withdraw from the competition after both he and partner Vanessa Bauer tested positive for COVID-19. On 22 February 2021, it was announced that Jason Donovan had been forced to withdraw from the competition after suffering a back injury.

Celebrity	Notability	Professional partner	Status
Myleene Klass	Hear'Say singer & presenter	Łukasz Różycki	Eliminated 1st on 24 January 2021
Denise van Outen	Actress, singer & presenter	Matt Evers	Withdrew on 26 January 2021
Graham Bell	Olympic skier & broadcaster	Karina Manta	Eliminated 2nd on 31 January 2021
Rufus Hound	Comedian, actor & presenter	Robin Johnstone	Withdrew on 3 February 2021
Billie Shepherd	The Only Way Is Essex star	Mark Hanretty	Withdrew on 6 February 2021
Matt Richardson	Comedian & television presenter	Vicky Ogden	Eliminated 3rd on 7 February 2021
Joe-Warren Plant	Emmerdale actor	Vanessa Bauer	Withdrew on 12 February 2021
Amy Tinkler	Olympic artistic gymnast	Joe Johnson	Eliminated 4th on 14 February 2021
Jason Donovan	Actor & singer	Alexandra Schauman	Withdrew on 22 February 2021
Rebekah Vardy	Television personality & model	Andy Buchanan	Eliminated 5th on 28 February 2021
Lady Leshurr	Rapper	Brendyn Hatfield	Eliminated 6th on 7 March 2021
Colin Jackson	Olympic hurdler	Klabera Komini	Third place on 14 March 2021
Faye Brookes	Coronation Street actress	Hamish Gaman; Matt Evers (Weeks 6–8)	Runners-up on 14 March 2021
Sonny Jay	Capital FM presenter	Angela Egan	Winners on 14 March 2021

== Scoring chart ==
The highest score each week is indicated in bold green with a dagger (†), while the lowest score each week is indicated in italicized red with a double-dagger (‡).

Color key:

Winners
Runners-up
Third place
Bottom two
Excused from competition for the week
Withdrew from competition
Eliminated

Dancing on Ice (series 13) - Weekly scores
Couple	Pl.	Week							
Couple	Pl.	1	2	3	4	5	6	7	8
Sonny Jay & Angela	1st	—N/a	26.5	28.0	29.5	**35.0**†	**37.5**†	37.0+38.0=75.0‡	39.5+40.0=79.5 (Note: This couple finished in first place.)
Faye & Hamish/Matt	2nd	—N/a	**31.5**†	29.0	**32.5**†	32.0	34.5	37.0+40.0=**77.0**†	38.0+40.0=78.0‡ (Note: This couple finished in second place.)
Colin & Klabera	3rd	—N/a	25.0	29.5	29.0 (Note: This couple was in the bottom two, but was not eliminated.)	32.5	**37.5**†	37.0+38.0=75.0‡	40.0+40.0=**80.0**† (Note: This couple finished in third place.)
Lady Leshurr & Brendyn	4th	**25.0**†	—N/a	24.5	**32.5**†	30.5	33.5‡	40.0+37.0=**77.0**† (Note: This couple was eliminated.)	
Rebekah & Andy	5th	**25.0**†	—N/a	25.0	30.0	32.5	34.0		
Jason & Alexandra	6th	**25.0**†	—N/a	22.0‡	26.5	(Note: This couple was excused from competition and was granted a bye to the following week.)	(Note: This couple withdrew from the competition.)		
Amy & Joe	7th	(Note: Amy & Joe did not join the competition until week 3.)		28.0	29.0	29.0‡			
Joe-Warren & Vanessa	8th	**25.0**†	—N/a	**30.0**†	**32.5**†				
Matt & Vicky	9th	(Note: Matt & Vicky did not join the competition until week 4.)			23.5‡				
Billie & Mark	10th	—N/a	25.0						
Rufus & Robin	11th	23.5	—N/a						
Graham & Karina	12th	—N/a	26.0	25.0					
Denise & Matt	13th	19.5‡	—N/a						
Myleene & Łukasz	14th	—N/a	22.0‡						

== Weekly scores ==
=== Week 1 (17 January) ===
Group performances:

- "Shine" — Emeli Sandé (performed by professional skaters with Torvill & Dean)
- "9 to 5" — Dolly Parton (Billie & Mark, Colin & Klabera, Faye & Hamish, Graham, Myleene & Łukasz, and Sonny Jay & Angela)
- "Run Boy Run" — Woodkid (performed by professional skaters)

Graham Bell and Yebin Mok were meant to perform this week. However, after Mok sustaining an injury in training, Rufus Hound and Robin Johnstone performed instead.

In a new twist for this series, during the first two weeks, the judges awarded a Golden Ticket to one couple, which granted them immunity from the public vote. Only half of the celebrities performed this week. The couple with the lowest votes from the first week competed against the couple with the lowest votes from second week in the skate-off. Couples are listed in the order they performed.

Couple	Judges' scores				Total score	Music	Result
Couple	Banjo	Barrowman	Torvill	Dean	Total score	Music	Result
Jason & Alexandra	6.0	6.0	6.5	6.5	25.0	"Moondance" — Michael Bublé	Safe
Joe-Warren & Vanessa	6.0	6.5	6.0	6.5	25.0	"Sucker" — Jonas Brothers	Safe
Denise & Matt	5.0	5.0	5.0	4.5	19.5	"Proud Mary" — Tina Turner	Safe
Lady Leshurr & Brendyn	6.5	6.0	6.0	6.5	25.0	"Salute" — Little Mix	Bottom two
Rufus & Robin	6.5	6.0	5.5	5.5	23.5	"Think About Things" — Daði og Gagnamagnið	Immunity
Rebekah & Andy	6.0	6.0	6.5	6.5	25.0	"Alive" — Sia	Safe

Golden Ticket vote

- Banjo: Rufus & Robin
- Barrowman: Rufus & Robin
- Torvill: Rufus & Robin
- Dean: Did not need to vote, but would have voted for Rufus & Robin

=== Week 2 (24 January) ===
Group performances:

- "Glitterball" — Sigma, feat. Ella Henderson (performed by professional skaters)
- "Roll Over Beethoven" — Electric Light Orchestra (Denise & Matt, Jason & Alexandra, Joe-Warren & Vanessa, Lady Leshurr & Brendyn, and Rebekah & Andy)
- "Don't Start Now" — Dua Lipa (performed by Joe Johnson & Karina Manta)

Due to Yebin Mok being injured, Graham Bell instead performed with Karina Manta this week. Rufus Hound and Robin Johnstone did not perform in the group routine after Hound came into contact with someone who tested positive for COVID-19, and was therefore forced to self-isolate for ten days.

Couples are listed in the order they performed.

Couple	Judges' scores				Total score	Music	Result
Couple	Banjo	Barrowman	Torvill	Dean	Total score	Music	Result
Colin & Klabera	6.0	6.0	6.5	6.5	25.0	"Tutti Frutti" — Little Richard	Safe
Billie & Mark	6.5	6.5	6.0	6.0	25.0	"Spice Up Your Life" — Spice Girls	Safe
Graham & Karina	6.0	6.0	7.0	7.0	26.0	"Pop Looks Bach" — Sam Fonteyn	Safe
Sonny Jay & Angela	6.5	7.0	6.5	6.5	26.5	"Hold Me While You Wait" — Lewis Capaldi	Immunity
Myleene & Łukasz	5.5	5.5	5.5	5.5	22.0	"Blinding Lights" — The Weeknd	Eliminated
Faye & Hamish	7.5	8.0	8.0	8.0	31.5	"Lover" — Taylor Swift	Safe

Golden Ticket vote

- Banjo: Colin & Klabera
- Barrowman: Sonny Jay & Angela
- Dean: Sonny Jay & Angela
- Torvill: Sonny Jay & Angela

Save Me skates

- Lady Leshurr & Brendyn: "Confident" — Demi Lovato
- Myleene & Łukasz: "Nothing's Real but Love" — Rebecca Ferguson

Judges' votes to save

- Banjo: Lady Leshurr & Brendyn
- Barrowman: Lady Leshurr & Brendyn
- Dean: Lady Leshurr & Brendyn
- Torvill: Did not need to vote, but would have voted for Lady Leshurr & Brendyn

=== Week 3 (31 January) ===
Theme: Musicals
Group performance: "When I Get My Name in Lights" — from Legs Diamond (all with John Barrowman)

Denise van Outen and Matt Evers withdrew from the competition earlier in the week due to van Outen's shoulder injury. They were replaced by Amy Tinkler and Joe Johnson, who performed for the first time this week.

Due to Yebin Mok's injury, Graham Bell again performed with Karina Manta this week. Rufus Hound and Robin Johnstone did not perform this week, as Hound was still self-isolating after coming into contact with someone who tested positive for COVID-19. Additionally, Billie Shepherd and Mark Hanretty did not perform this week due to a family bereavement.

Couples are listed in the order they performed.

Couple	Judges' scores				Total score	Music	Musical	Result
Couple	Banjo	Barrowman	Torvill	Dean	Total score	Music	Musical	Result
Faye & Hamish	7.0	7.5	7.0	7.5	29.0	"Supercalifragilisticexpialidocious"	Mary Poppins	Safe
Rebekah & Andy	6.0	6.0	6.5	6.5	25.0	"Let's Face the Music and Dance"	Follow the Fleet	Bottom two
Sonny Jay & Angela	7.0	7.0	7.0	7.0	28.0	"Flash, Bang, Wallop"	Half a Sixpence	Safe
Amy & Joe	7.0	7.5	6.5	7.0	28.0	"Fame"	Fame	Safe
Graham & Karina	6.5	6.5	6.0	6.0	25.0	"Born to Hand Jive"	Grease	Eliminated
Jason & Alexandra	5.5	5.5	5.5	5.5	22.0	"Don't Leave Me This Way"	Priscilla, Queen of the Desert	Safe
Lady Leshurr & Brendyn	6.0	6.0	6.5	6.0	24.5	"If My Friends Could See Me Now"	Sweet Charity	Safe
Colin & Klabera	7.5	7.0	7.5	7.5	29.5	"I Will Always Love You"	The Bodyguard	Safe
Joe-Warren & Vanessa	7.0	7.0	8.0	8.0	30.0	"The Room Where It Happens"	Hamilton	Safe

Save Me skates

- Rebekah & Andy: "My Life Would Suck Without You" — Kelly Clarkson
- Graham & Karina: "Many of Horror" — Biffy Clyro

Judges' votes to save

- Banjo: Rebekah & Andy
- Barrowman: Rebekah & Andy
- Torvill: Rebekah & Andy
- Dean: Did not need to vote, but would have voted for Rebekah & Andy

=== Week 4 (7 February) ===
Theme: Dance Week
Torvill & Dean performance: "Me and My Shadow" — Frank Sinatra & Sammy Davis Jr.

Rufus Hound and Robin Johnstone withdrew from the competition earlier in the week after Hound tested positive for COVID-19. They were replaced by Matt Richardson and Vicky Ogden, who performed for the first time this week. Billie Shepherd and Mark Hanretty withdrew from the competition the day before the live show after Shepherd suffered a head injury during training.

Couples are listed in the order they performed.

Couple	Judges' scores				Total score	Music	Dance style	Result
Couple	Banjo	Barrowman	Torvill	Dean	Total score	Music	Dance style	Result
Joe-Warren & Vanessa	7.0	8.5	8.5	8.5	32.5	"The Ballroom Blitz" — The Sweet	Quickstep	Safe
Matt & Vicky	6.0	6.5	6.0	5.0	23.5	"Somebody Told Me" — The Killers	Paso doble	Eliminated
Rebekah & Andy	7.0	7.5	7.5	8.0	30.0	"Galop infernal" — Jacques Offenbach	Can-can	Safe
Sonny Jay & Angela	6.5	7.5	8.0	7.5	29.5	"Rather Be" — Clean Bandit, feat. Jess Glynne	Baroque	Safe
Jason & Alexandra	6.0	6.5	7.0	7.0	26.5	"Here Comes the Rain Again" — Eurythmics	Tango	Safe
Colin & Klabera	6.5	7.5	7.5	7.5	29.0	"Bamboléo" — Gipsy Kings	Samba	Bottom two
Lady Leshurr & Brendyn	7.5	8.5	8.0	8.5	32.5	"Candyman" — Christina Aguilera	Swing	Safe
Amy & Joe	7.5	7.5	7.0	7.0	29.0	"5,6,7,8" — Steps	Line dance	Safe
Faye & Hamish	7.5	8.0	8.5	8.5	32.5	"Swan Lake" — Tchaikovsky	Ballet	Safe

Save Me skates

- Matt & Vicky: "Youngblood" — 5 Seconds of Summer
- Colin & Klabera: "Leave Right Now" — Will Young

Judges' votes to save

- Banjo: Colin & Klabera
- Barrowman: Colin & Klabera
- Dean: Colin & Klabera
- Torvill: Did not need to vote, but would have voted for Colin & Klabera

=== Week 5 (14 February) ===
Theme: Love Stories
Group performances:

- "Can't Take My Eyes Off You" — Andy Williams
- "Clair de lune" — Claude Debussy (performed by Mark Hanretty & Yebin Mok)

Special musical guest: Rita Ora—"Bang Bang"

Joe-Warren Plant and Vanessa Bauer withdrew from the competition on 12 February after they both tested positive for COVID-19. Jason Donovan and Alexandra Schauman did not perform this week due to Jason suffering from back pain.

Couples are listed in the order they performed.

Couple	Judges' scores				Total score	Music	Love story	Result
Couple	Banjo	Barrowman	Torvill	Dean	Total score	Music	Love story	Result
Sonny Jay & Angela	8.5	8.5	9.0	9.0	35.0	"Wellerman (Sea Shanty)" — Nathan Evans (220 Kid x Billen Ted Remix)	Popeye & Olive Oyl	Safe
Lady Leshurr & Brendyn	7.5	7.5	7.5	8.0	30.5	"Maneater" — Nelly Furtado	Antony & Cleopatra	Bottom two
Faye & Hamish	7.5	7.5	8.5	8.5	32.0	"Marry You" — Bruno Mars	Prince William & Kate Middleton	Safe
Rebekah & Andy	7.5	8.0	8.5	8.5	32.5	"I'll Be There for You" — The Rembrandts	Ross & Rachel	Safe
Amy & Joe	7.5	7.0	7.0	7.5	29.0	"Bang Bang" — will.i.am	Bonnie & Clyde	Eliminated
Colin & Klabera	8.0	8.5	8.0	8.0	32.5	"With or Without You" — 2Cellos & U2	Mr. Darcy & Elizabeth Bennet	Safe

Save Me skates

- Lady Leshurr & Brendyn: "Confident" — Demi Lovato
- Amy & Joe: "Final Song" — MØ

Judges' votes to save

- Banjo: Lady Leshurr & Brendyn
- Barrowman: Lady Leshurr & Brendyn
- Torvill: Lady Leshurr & Brendyn
- Dean: Did not need to vote, but would have voted for Lady Leshurr & Brendyn

=== Week 6 (28 February) ===
Theme: Movie Week
Group musical performance: Marisha Wallace — "Reflection" (from Mulan; with professional skaters)
Torvill & Dean performance: "Stand by Me" — Florence and the Machine

This episode was originally set to air on 21 February; however, a decision was made to postpone the show for a week to allow the remaining couples to recover from any injuries.

Jason Donovan and Alexandra Schauman withdrew from the competition earlier in the week due to Jason's back injury. Faye Brookes performed with Matt Evers for the first time this week after Hamish Gaman withdrew from the competition due to injury.

Couples are listed in the order they performed.

Couple	Judges' scores				Total score	Music	Film	Result
Couple	Banjo	Barrowman	Torvill	Dean	Total score	Music	Film	Result
Colin & Klabera	9.0	9.5	9.5	9.5	37.5	"You Should Be Dancing"	Saturday Night Fever	Safe
Rebekah & Andy	8.5	9.0	8.0	8.5	34.0	"Moon River"	Breakfast at Tiffany's	Eliminated
Sonny Jay & Angela	9.5	9.0	9.5	9.5	37.5	"Town Called Malice"	Billy Elliot	Safe
Faye & Matt	8.5	8.5	9.0	8.5	34.5	"Oh, Pretty Woman"	Pretty Woman	Safe
Lady Leshurr & Brendyn	8.0	8.5	8.5	8.5	33.5	"Jurassic Park Theme"	Jurassic Park	Bottom two

Save Me skates

- Rebekah & Andy: "My Life Would Suck Without You" — Kelly Clarkson
- Lady Leshurr & Brendyn: "Candyman" — Christina Aguilera

Judges' votes to save

- Banjo: Lady Leshurr & Brendyn
- Barrowman: Rebekah & Andy
- Dean: Lady Leshurr & Brendyn
- Torvill: Lady Leshurr & Brendyn

=== Week 7: Semifinals (7 March) ===
Theme: Prop Week
Group performances:

- "Mad World" — Jasmine Thompson & "Make 'Em Laugh" — from Singin' in the Rain (performed by professional skaters)
- "Will You Still Love Me Tomorrow?" — Amy Winehouse (performed by Joe Johnson & Karina Manta)

Couples are listed in the order they performed.

Couple	Order	Judges' scores				Total score	Music	Prop	Result
Couple	Order	Banjo	Barrowman	Torvill	Dean	Total score	Music	Prop	Result
Faye & Matt	1	9.5	9.5	9.0	9.0	77.0	"It Don't Mean a Thing (If It Ain't Got That Swing)" — Tony Bennett & Lady Gaga	Golf clubs	Safe
Faye & Matt	5	10.0	10.0	10.0	10.0	77.0	"The Best" — James Bay	Golf clubs	Safe
Lady Leshurr & Brendyn	2	10.0	10.0	10.0	10.0	77.0	"Shout" — Lulu	Chairs	Eliminated
Lady Leshurr & Brendyn	7	9.5	9.5	9.0	9.0	77.0	"No One" — Alicia Keys	Chairs	Eliminated
Colin & Klabera	3	9.0	9.0	9.5	9.5	75.0	"Ça plane pour moi" — Plastic Bertrand	Hotel trolley	Bottom two
Colin & Klabera	6	9.5	9.5	9.5	9.5	75.0	"Baby, I Love Your Way" — Big Mountain	Hotel trolley	Bottom two
Sonny Jay & Angela	4	9.0	9.0	9.5	9.5	75.0	"River" — Bishop Briggs	Table	Safe
Sonny Jay & Angela	8	9.5	9.5	9.5	9.5	75.0	"Sweet Disposition" — The Temper Trap	Table	Safe

Save Me skates

- Lady Leshurr & Brendyn: "Candyman" — Christina Aguilera
- Colin & Klabera: "Leave Right Now" — Will Young

Judges' votes to save

- Banjo: Lady Leshurr & Brendyn
- Barrowman: Lady Leshurr & Brendyn
- Torvill: Colin & Klabera
- Dean: Colin & Klabera (Since the other judges were not unanimous, Dean, as head judge, made the final decision to save Colin & Klabera)

=== Week 8: Finale (14 March) ===
Group performance: "Amazing" — Foxes (performed by professional skaters)
Torvill & Dean performance: "Fly Me to the Moon" — Frank Sinatra

Couples are listed in the order they performed.

Couple	Order	Judges' scores				Total score	Music	Result
Couple	Order	Banjo	Barrowman	Torvill	Dean	Total score	Music	Result
Faye & Matt	1	9.5	9.5	9.5	9.5	78.0	"Teenage Dream" — Katy Perry	Runners-up
Faye & Matt	4	10.0	10.0	10.0	10.0	78.0	"Swan Lake" — Tchaikovsky	Runners-up
Sonny Jay & Angela	2	10.0	10.0	9.5	10.0	79.5	"Sitting on the Ice in an Ice Rink", "When I'm Cleaning Windows" & "Leaning on a Lamp-post" — George Formby	Winners
Sonny Jay & Angela	5	10.0	10.0	10.0	10.0	79.5	"Wellerman (Sea Shanty)" — Nathan Evans (220 Kid x Billen Ted Remix)	Winners
Colin & Klabera	3	10.0	10.0	10.0	10.0	80.0	"Hot Hot Hot" — Arrow	Third place
Colin & Klabera	6	10.0	10.0	10.0	10.0	80.0	"I Will Always Love You" — from The Bodyguard	Third place

== Ratings ==
Official ratings are taken from BARB. Viewing figures are from 7 day data.

Episode	Date	Total viewers (millions)
Live show 1	17 January	6.07
Live show 2	24 January	5.56
Live show 3	31 January	4.98
Live show 4	7 February	5.15
Live show 5	14 February	4.99
Live show 6	28 February	4.19
Live show 7	7 March	4.34
Live show 8	14 March	4.25
