= Mark Hanretty =

Scottish ice dancer (born 1985)

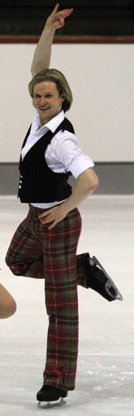
- Chitwood/Hanretty at the 2009 Nebelhorn Trophy

Personal information
- Full name: Mark Hanretty
- Born: 21 March 1985 (age 41) Erskine, Scotland
- Height: 1.83 m (6 ft 0 in)

Figure skating career
- Country: Great Britain
- Skating club: iceSheffield
- Began skating: 1995
- Retired: 2010

Mark Hanretty (born 21 March 1985) is a Scottish former competitive ice dancer who represented the United Kingdom with Christina Chitwood. They are two-time (2008, 2010) British medalists and competed at the 2009 European Championships, placing 18th and at the 2010 World Figure Skating Championships in Turin, Italy. Hanretty served as a professional skater on the ITV competition series Dancing on Ice from 2011 until his departure in 2025.

== Competitive career ==
Hanretty began figure skating in 1995. As a single skater, he was coached by John Christie and Diane C. Dewar in Edinburgh and East Kilbride. He switched to ice dancing in 2004. He competed briefly with Lauren Bradshaw.

Hanretty and American ice dancer Christina Chitwood decided to team up on 31 December 2005 and began training together properly in May 2006. Their training was disrupted by Chitwood's contraction of mononucleosis (glandular fever). They made their debut in January 2007 at the British Championships at the National Ice Centre in Nottingham, England, finishing in 7th place.

Chitwood/Hanretty won bronze at the 2008 British Championships at IceSheffield in Sheffield in January 2008. In the summer of 2008, they were selected by the National Ice Skating Association (NISA) to join the Great Britain Squad (also known as Team Skate G.B.). This enabled them to represent Great Britain in elite international competitions. In September 2008, Chitwood/Hanretty made their international debut at the 2008 Nebelhorn Trophy in Oberstdorf, Germany, where they placed 10th. In November of that same year, they won the bronze medal in their second international competition, the Pavel Roman Memorial in Olomouc, Czech Republic.

Chitwood/Hanretty placed 4th at the 2009 British Championships at the National Ice Centre in Nottingham, in January 2009. However, their international success earlier in the season enabled them to qualify for the 2009 European Championships in Helsinki, Finland. At the event, they competed alongside the first-ranked British team, Sinead Kerr / John Kerr, and finished 18th.

In autumn 2009, Chitwood/Hanretty placed 8th at the 2009 Nebelhorn Trophy in Oberstdorf, Germany, fourth at the Ice Challenge in Graz, Austria, third at the 2009 NRW Trophy in Dortmund, Germany, and fourth at the Mont Blanc Trophy in Courmayeur, Italy. In November 2009, Chitwood/Hanretty won the bronze medal at the 2010 British Championships at IceSheffield in Sheffield. They were ranked third overall in the 2009–10 NISA National Rankings, based on the personal best scores achieved during the 2009–2010 season. They retired from competition in 2010.

Chitwood/Hanretty received funding from the Lloyds TSB Local Heroes initiative.

== Later career ==
=== Dancing on Ice ===
Since 2011, Hanretty appeared on ITV's Dancing on Ice. He was partnered with Nadia Sawalha in series 6 in 2011. They were voted out early along with Angela Rippon and Sean Rice. In series 7 in 2012, Hanretty was partnered with Rosemary Conley. They were the sixth couple eliminated. Hanretty skated with Oona King in series 8 in 2013. On 20 January 2013, he dislocated his shoulder as he was about to perform the survival skate but a doctor moved it back into place and the couple completed the performance. They were eliminated at the end of the show. Hanretty was set to be paired with Bonnie Langford for the ninth series, however was forced to withdraw due to injury and was replaced by Andrei Lipanov.

On 21 November 2017, it was confirmed that Hanretty would return to Dancing on Ice when the show returned for its tenth series in January 2018. His partner was Donna Air. In 2019, he was partnered with Saira Khan, and 2020, he was partnered with Libby Clegg. In 2021, he was paired with Billie Shepherd. They had to withdraw from the competition in Week 4, due to Billie sustaining a head injury during training. For the fourteenth series he was paired with Kimberly Wyatt and they finished in third place. In series 15 he was paired with Carley Stenson and they were the sixth couple to be eliminated. He was partnered with Adele Roberts for series 16 and they also finished in third place. Prior to the start of series 17, in October 2024 5 confirmed it would be his final series as a professional; he was paired with Michaela Strachan and they finished as runner-ups to Sam Aston and his professional partner Molly Lanaghan.

Hanretty's statistics
Series	Celebrity Partner	Place
6 (2011)	Nadia Sawalha	DNQ
7 (2012)	Rosemary Conley	10th
8 (2013)	Oona King	10th
10 (2018)	Donna Air	6th
11 (2019)	Saira Khan	9th
12 (2020)	Libby Clegg	3rd
13 (2021)	Billie Shepherd	10th
14 (2022)	Kimberly Wyatt	3rd
15 (2023)	Carley Stenson	6th
16 (2024)	Adele Roberts	3rd
17 (2025)	Michaela Strachan	2nd

=== Other work ===
In 2012, Hanretty won the Young Artists Showcase, a choreography competition in the United States. He works as a coach and choreographer, based mainly in Sheffield, England.

== Personal life ==
Hanretty was born in Erskine, near Glasgow in Scotland. He lives with his wife, Kathy – a skating coach – in Nottinghamshire. Their son, Lukasz, was born 2 February 2013.

== Programs ==
(with Chitwood)

Season	Original dance	Free dance
2009–2010	Scottish folk: Highland by Phil Keaggy; Amazing Grace by David Arnold; Clueless by various artists	El Tango De Roxanne from Moulin Rouge!
2008–2009	Bei Mir Bistu Shein composed by Sholom Secunda	Elizabeth: The Golden Age composed by Craig Armstrong
2007–2008	Scottish folk: Highland by Phil Keaggy; Amazing Grace by David Arnold; Clueless by various artists	The Mission; Nella Fantasia
2006–2007	Assassin's Tango (from Mr. & Mrs Smith); Una Música Brutal by Gotan Project	Handel's Sarabande by Amici

== Competitive highlights ==
(with Christina Chitwood)

International
Event	06–07	07–08	08–09	09–10
Worlds				23rd
Europeans			18th	
Ice Challenge				4th
Pavel Roman Memorial			3rd	
Mont Blanc Trophy				4th
Nebelhorn Trophy			10th	8th
NRW Trophy				3rd
National
British Champ.	7th	3rd	4th	3rd
Scottish Champ.	5th			

(with Lauren Bradshaw)

Event	2004–05
British Championships	2nd J.
J. = Junior level

== Detailed competitive results ==
(with Christina Chitwood)

Event	Season	Compulsory Dance (CD)	Original Dance (OD)	Free Dance (FD)	Combined Total Score
European Figure Skating Championships	2008 – 2009	23.75	44.56	66.67	134.98
British Figure Skating Championships	2009 – 2010	27.14	48.87	76.38	152.39
British Figure Skating Championships	2008 – 2009	20.03	45.52	67.51	133.06
British Figure Skating Championships	2007 – 2008	23.83	48.25	73.05	145.13
British Figure Skating Championships	2006 – 2007	15.99	34.17	57.11	107.27
Mont Blanc Trophy	2009 – 2010	28.12	45.16	71.36	144.64
NRW Trophy	2009 – 2010	29.46	49.25	77.34	156.05
Ice Challenge	2009 – 2010	28.30	47.20	74.65	150.15
Pavel Roman Memorial	2008 – 2009	27.32	46.77	70.08	144.17
Nebelhorn Trophy	2009 – 2010	29.02	45.06	72.14	146.22
Nebelhorn Trophy	2008 – 2009	25.55	41.50	64.98	132.03
