= Iwan Lewis =

Welsh actor

- Born: Iwan Hedd Lewis; 28 December 1988 (age 37); Llandeilo, Wales
- Occupations: Stage and Film Actor
- Years active: 2010–present

Iwan Lewis (born 28 December 1988) is a Welsh theatre and film actor. He is known for the roles of Emmett in the UK tour of the stage version of Legally Blonde and Bahorel in the film version of Les Miserables. Lewis graduated from the Guildford School of Acting in 2010. In 2007, during his time at the GSA, he was a recipient of an award from the Elizabeth Evans Trust. In addition to his roles in Les Misérables and Legally Blonde, Lewis also appeared in the 2010 London Revival of Stephen Sondheim's Passion.

Lewis appeared as Oarsman in the Park Theatre transfer of Therese Raquin, which ran from the end of July through to August in 2014. He is represented by Stuart Piper and Oliver Thomson at Cole-Kitchenn.

In March 2017, he became Artistic Director of the Barn Theatre. The theatre's first production, a folk rework of The Secret Garden musical in March 2018, received 4 stars from The Stage, calling it "A delight for all ages". Lewis received a 2018 The Stage Debut Awards nomination for his direction on the theatre's 2018 Built By Barn production of Simon Stephens' One Minute.

In 2023, Lewis became engaged to Faye Brookes after three months into their relationship and in August that year, is now married to her.
