= Christina Chitwood =

American ice dancer

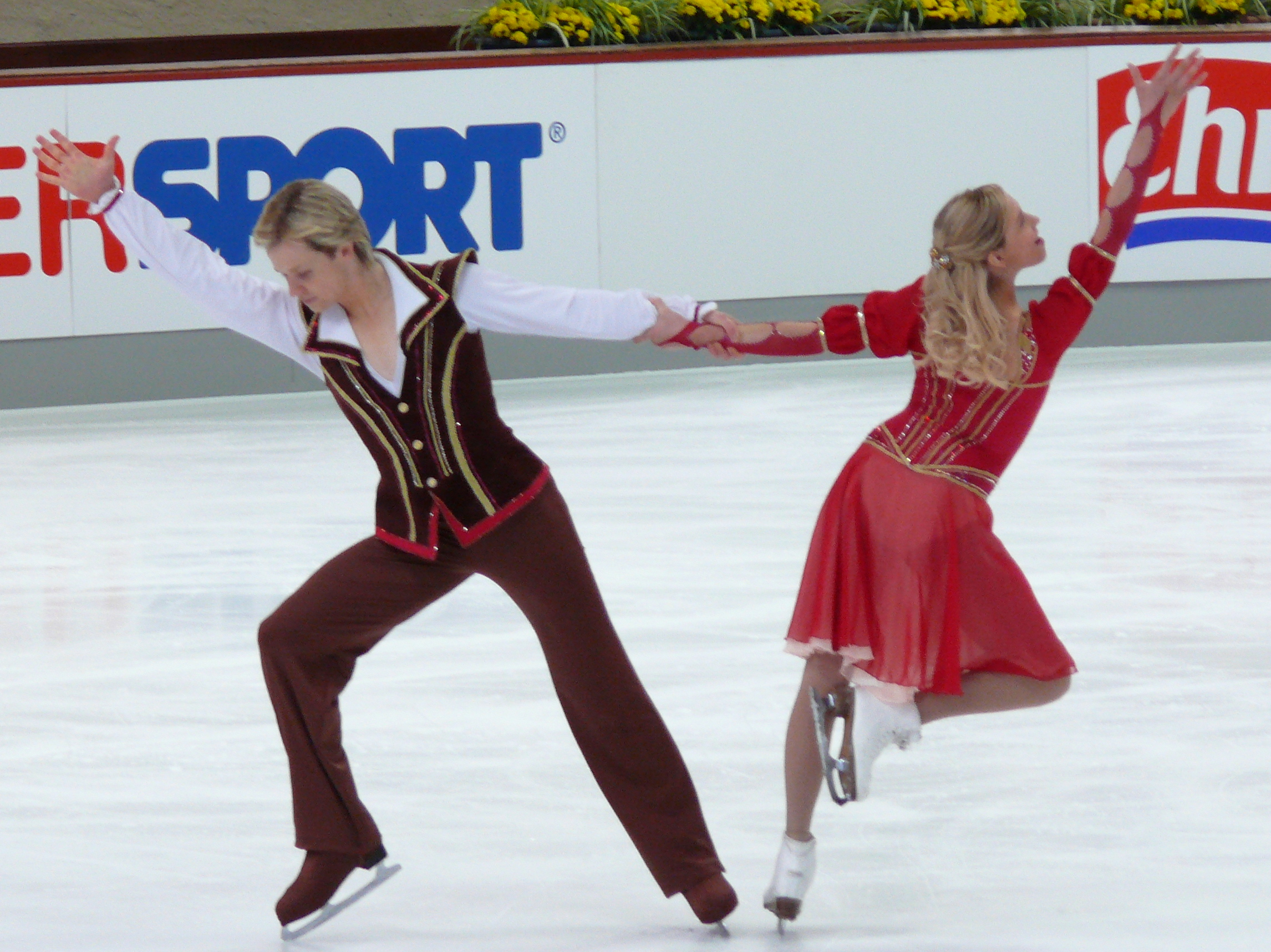
- Chitwood/Hanretty skating their free dance at the 2008 Nebelhorn Trophy

Personal information
- Born: 21 March 1990 (age 36) Sioux Falls, South Dakota, United States
- Height: 1.73 m (5 ft 8 in)

Figure skating career
- Country: United Kingdom
- Skating club: iceSheffield
- Retired: 2010

Christina Chitwood (born 21 March 1990) is an American former competitive ice dancer who represented Great Britain with Mark Hanretty. They are two-time (2008, 2010) British bronze medalists and competed at the 2009 European Championships, placing 18th.

== Competitive career ==
Early in her career, Chitwood competed in pair skating with her brother, Will Chitwood. She later switched to ice dancing and competed with Stephen Chasman.

Chitwood and Scottish ice dancer Mark Hanretty decided to team up on 31 December 2005 and began training together properly in May 2006. Their training was disrupted by Chitwood's contraction of glandular fever (also known as mononucleosis). They made their debut at the 2007 British Championships at the National Ice Centre in Nottingham, Great Britain, in January 2007, finishing in 7th place.

Chitwood and Hanretty won bronze at the 2008 British Championships at IceSheffield in Sheffield in January 2008. In the summer of 2008, they were selected by the National Ice Skating Association (NISA) to join the Great Britain Squad (also known as Team Skate G.B.). This enabled them to represent Great Britain in elite international competitions. In September 2008, Chitwood and Hanretty made their international debut at the 2008 Nebelhorn Trophy in Oberstdorf, Germany, where they placed 10th. In November of that same year, they won the bronze medal in their second international competition, the Pavel Roman Memorial in Olomouc, Czech Republic.

Chitwood and Hanretty placed 4th at the 2009 British Championships at the National Ice Centre in Nottingham, in January 2009. However, their international success earlier in the season enabled them to qualify for the 2009 European Championships in Helsinki, Finland. At the event, they competed alongside the first-ranked British team, Sinead Kerr / John Kerr, and finished 18th.

In autumn 2009, Chitwood and Hanretty placed 8th at the 2009 Nebelhorn Trophy in Oberstdorf, Germany, fourth at the Ice Challenge in Graz, Austria, third at the 2009 NRW Trophy in Dortmund, Germany, and fourth at the Mont Blanc Trophy in Courmayeur, Italy. In November 2009, Chitwood and Hanretty won the bronze medal at the 2010 British Championships at IceSheffield in Sheffield. They were ranked third overall in the 2009–2010 NISA National Rankings, based on the personal best scores achieved during the 2009–2010 season. They retired from competition at the end of the season.

Chitwood and Hanretty received funding from the Lloyds TSB Local Heroes initiative.

== Programs ==
(with Hanretty)

Season	Original dance	Free dance
2009–2010	Scottish folk: Highland by Phil Keaggy; Amazing Grace by David Arnold; Clueless by various artists	El Tango De Roxanne from Moulin Rouge!
2008–2009	Bei Mir Bistu Shein composed by Sholom Secunda	Elizabeth: The Golden Age composed by Craig Armstrong
2007–2008	Scottish folk: Highland by Phil Keaggy; Amazing Grace by David Arnold; Clueless by various artists	The Mission; Nella Fantasia
2006–2007	Assassin's Tango (from Mr. & Mrs Smith); Una Música Brutal by Gotan Project	Handel's Sarabande by Amici Forever

== Competitive highlights ==
=== With Hanretty for the United Kingdom ===
International
Event	2006–07	2007–08	2008–09	2009–10
World Championships				23rd
European Championships			18th	
Mont Blanc Trophy				4th
NRW Trophy				3rd
Ice Challenge				4th
Pavel Roman Memorial			3rd	
Nebelhorn Trophy			10th	8th
National
British Championships	7th	3rd	4th	3rd
Scottish Championships	5th			

=== With Chasman for the United States ===
Event	2004–05
US Championships	7th J.
Midwestern Sectional Championships	3rd J.
J. = Junior level

== Detailed competitive results ==
(with Mark Hanretty)

Event	Season	Compulsory Dance (CD)	Original Dance (OD)	Free Dance (FD)	Combined Total Score
European Figure Skating Championships	2008 – 2009	23.75	44.56	66.67	134.98
British Figure Skating Championships	2009 – 2010	27.14	48.87	76.38	152.39
British Figure Skating Championships	2008 – 2009	20.03	45.52	67.51	133.06
British Figure Skating Championships	2007 – 2008	23.83	48.25	73.05	145.13
British Figure Skating Championships	2006 – 2007	15.99	34.17	57.11	107.27
Mont Blanc Trophy	2009 – 2010	28.12	45.16	71.36	144.64
NRW Trophy	2009 – 2010	29.46	49.25	77.34	156.05
Ice Challenge	2009 – 2010	28.30	47.20	74.65	150.15
Pavel Roman Memorial	2008 – 2009	27.32	46.77	70.08	144.17
Nebelhorn Trophy	2009 – 2010	29.02	45.06	72.14	146.22
Nebelhorn Trophy	2008 – 2009	25.55	41.50	64.98	132.03
