= Joe-Warren Plant =

English actor (born 2002)

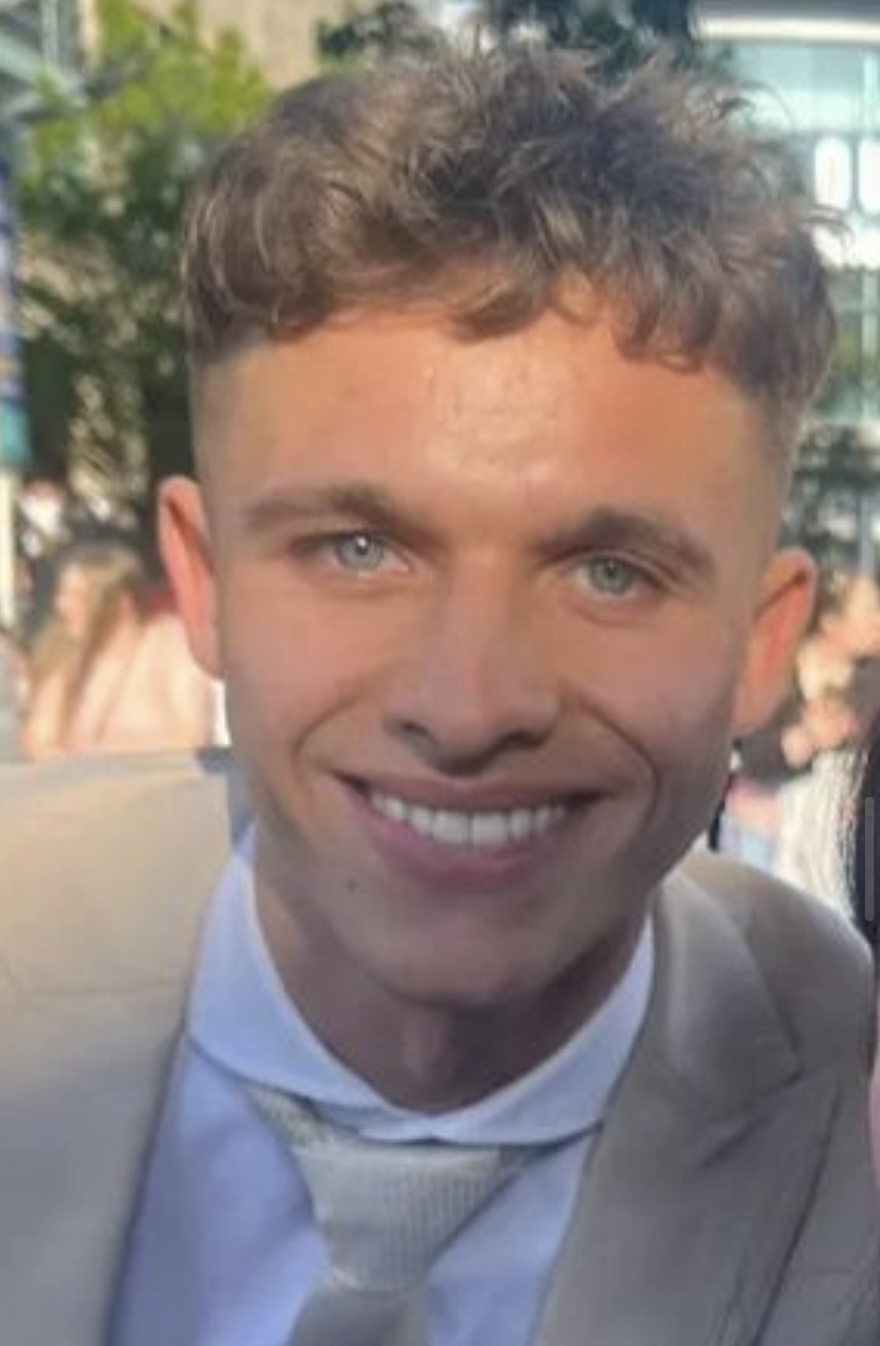
- Plant in 2023
- Born: Joseph Warren Plant; 12 April 2002 (age 24); Blackpool, Lancashire, England
- Education: Baines School
- Occupation: Actor
- Years active: 2010–present

Joseph-Warren Plant (born 12 April 2002) is an English actor, best known for portraying the role of Jacob Gallagher in the ITV soap opera Emmerdale. He has portrayed the role of Jacob since 2010 and has been nominated for a British Soap Award in the Best Young Performance category three times, in 2014, 2019 and 2021. He was also a contestant on the thirteenth series of Dancing on Ice in 2021.

== Early life ==
Plant was born in Blackpool on 12 April 2002 to mother Steph Plant. His father is Warren Plant. He was raised in Poulton-le-Fylde with his parents. Plant had been enrolled in the Scream Theatre School in Blackpool since he was four years old.

== Career ==
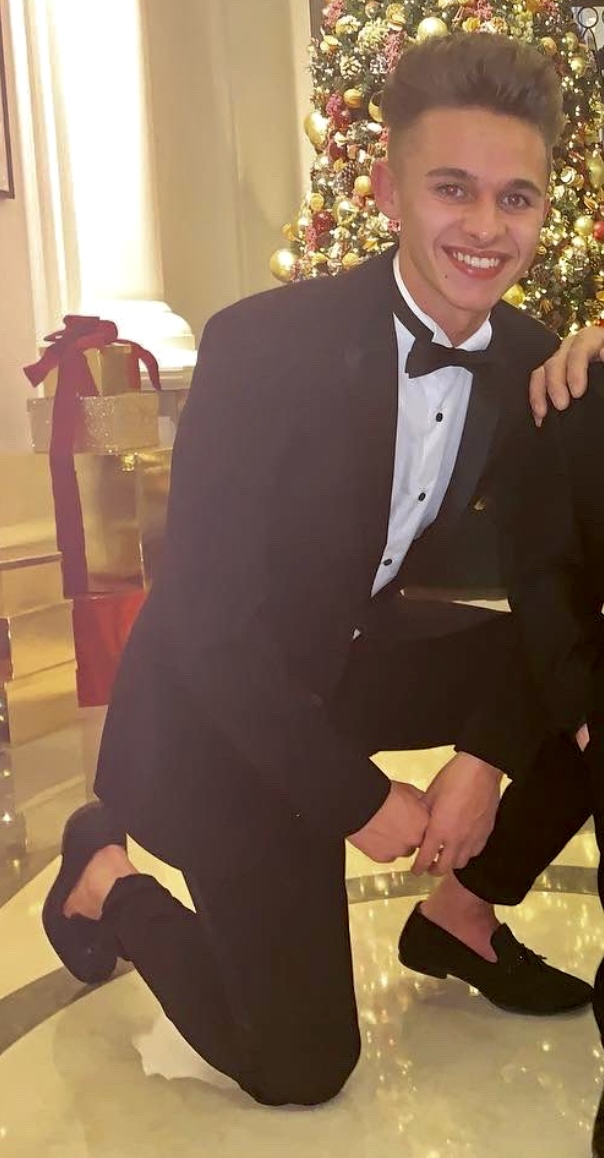
Plant in 2022

=== Emmerdale ===
In August 2010, aged 8, Plant joined the cast of Emmerdale as Jacob Gallagher. The character was introduced along with his parents Justin (Andrew Langtree) and Alicia Gallagher (Natalie Anderson). During his time on the soap Jacob's storylines have included finding out he was adopted and that he is the biological son of Leyla Harding (Roxy Shahidi) and being groomed by Maya Stepney (Louisa Clein).

Plant was nominated three times for Best Young Actor at The British Soap Awards in 2014, 2019 and 2021. Plant was discovered at Scream Theatre School in Blackpool by the Actors Agency division of Scream Management, which is now based at MediaCityUK, Salford Afterwards, Plant was recruited by Scream Management and acted on his behalf as his agent and secured him the role in Emmerdale.

In 2020, it was announced that Plant would be taking a six-month break from appearing in the show due to competing in Dancing on Ice.

=== Dancing on Ice and other work ===
In 2021, Plant was a contestant on the British show Dancing on Ice where he was partnered with Vanessa Bauer. Aged 18 at the time of competing, Plant is the youngest contestant to ever participate in the show. In February 2021, Plant and Bauer had to leave the show early due to both skaters testing positive for COVID-19.

Plant had not experienced any symptoms of COVID-19, however, after receiving a positive test, he had to withdraw from the series, claiming that he was "gutted". Even after completing the required isolation period in a hotel, ITV bosses at Dancing on Ice refused to let Plant and Bauer participate in the show again, with a spokesperson at ITV claiming that there was a "fear" that letting Plant skate and participate in the show again "may upset the apple cart". An official statement from ITV thanked Plant and Bauer for "all their dedication and beautiful performances".

==== Performances ====
Date	Couple	Judges' scores				Total	Scoreboard	Song	Result
Date	Couple	Banjo	Barrowman	Torvill	Dean	Total	Scoreboard	Song	Result
17 January	Joe-Warren & Vanessa	6.0	6.5	6.0	6.5	25.0	=1st	"Sucker"—Jonas Brothers	Safe
31 January	Joe-Warren & Vanessa	7.0	7.0	8.0	8.0	30.0	1st	"The Room Where It Happens"—from Hamilton	Safe
7 February	Joe-Warren & Vanessa	7.0	8.5	8.5	8.5	32.5	=1st	"The Ballroom Blitz"—The Sweet	Safe
14 February	Joe-Warren & Vanessa	N/A	N/A	N/A	N/A	N/A	N/A	"Secret Love Song"—Little Mix	Withdrew (due to testing positive for COVID-19.)

Plant portrayed the role of Harri Hart in the US action film Broken Hearts. In 2018, Plant appeared as a contestant on Soap Hand of Dance with Arran Crascall, a series by YouTuber Arran Crascall where soap stars from the United Kingdom compete to show off their dancing skills. To celebrate 50 years of Emmerdale being broadcast, he participated in a special of Ninja Warrior UK in 2022.

Plant frequently participates in charity football matches in order to raise awareness of cancer and Down’s Syndrome.

== Personal life ==
Plant attended Baines School in Poulton-Le-Fylde. He was in a relationship with Nicole Hadlow for three years, however, in 2021 just prior to his appearance on Dancing on Ice, the couple decided to separate, citing relationship issues between Plant and Hadlow as a result of his close relationship and partnership with his Dancing on Ice partner Vanessa Bauer.

== Filmography ==
Year	Title	Role	Notes
2010–present	Emmerdale	Jacob Gallagher	Series regular Nominated–Best Young Actor (British Soap Awards, 2021); Nominated– Best Young Actor (British Soap Awards, 2019); Nominated–Best Young Performance (British Soap Awards, 2014)
2012	Broken Hearts	Harri Hart	
2018	Soap Hand of Dance with Arron Crascall	Himself	
2021	Dancing on Ice	Himself, contestant	Withdrew, 8th Place
2021	Central Tonight	Himself	
2022	The British Soap Awards	Himself	Nominee
2022	Ninja Warrior UK	Contestant	
