= David King (figure skater) =

British pair skater

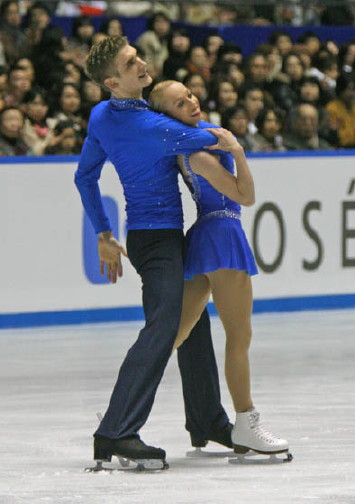
- Stacey and David in 2008

Personal information
- Full name: David King
- Born: 8 May 1984 (age 42) Carlisle, Cumbria
- Height: 184 cm (6 ft 0 in)

Figure skating career
- Country: Great Britain
- Partner: Stacey King (née Kemp)
- Began skating: 1994
- Retired: 2014

David King (born 8 May 1984) is an English former competitive pair skater who represented Great Britain. With his wife Stacey King (née Kemp), he is an eight-time British national champion.

== Personal life ==
David King was born on 8 May 1984 in Carlisle, Cumbria. He became engaged to Stacey Kemp in 2010. They married in April 2016.

== Career ==
Originally a skier, King began skating at age ten. He teamed up with Kemp in 2003. The pair began appearing internationally in the 2004–05 season. After competing on the Junior Grand Prix (JGP) series, they placed 11th at the 2005 World Junior Championships in Kitchener, Ontario, Canada.

The following season, Kemp/King moved up to the senior level. They placed 11th at the 2006 European Championships in Lyon, France, and 17th at the 2006 World Championships in Calgary, Alberta, Canada. They were coached by Dawn Spendlove and Stephen Pickavance in Blackburn.

The pair's Grand Prix debut came in November 2006; they placed ninth at the 2006 Cup of China and then seventh at the 2006 NHK Trophy. They trained in Blackburn under Dawn Spendlove. Following the 2006–07 season, they joined Mariusz Siudek and Dorota Siudek in Toruń, Poland.

In January 2010, Kemp/King placed 13th in the short program, 10th in the free skate, and 11th overall at the European Championships in Tallinn, Estonia. In February, the pair represented the UK at the 2010 Winter Olympics in Vancouver, British Columbia, Canada. They finished 16th after ranking 16th in both segments. Concluding their season, they placed 16th at the 2010 World Championships, held in March in Turin, Italy.

Kemp/King were coached by the Siudeks until the end of the 2010–11 season. After moving to Florida, they were coached by Jeremy Barrett in the 2011–12 season and then joined Lyndon Johnston.

In January 2014, Kemp/King finished 13th at the European Championships in Budapest, having placed 16th in the short and 13th in the free. In February, they competed at the 2014 Winter Olympics in Sochi, Russia. During the team trophy, the pair placed tenth in their segment and the UK team had the same result. During the separate pairs' event, Kemp/King placed 19th in the short program and did not advance to the free skate. Their coaches were Lyndon Johnston, Jim Peterson, and Alison Smith.

== Programs ==
(with Kemp)

Season	Short program	Free skating
2013–14	Piano Concerto No. 1 by Pyotr I. Tchaikovsky	"Eleanor Rigby" by The Beatles; Imagine by John Lennon; Hey Jude by The Beatles
2012–13	Doctor Zhivago by Maurice Jarre	Pomp and Circumstance by Edward Elgar
2011–12	Cello Suite No. 1 in G major by Johann Sebastian Bach performed by Yo-Yo Ma	Far and Away by John Williams
2010–11	Coldplay	Sweeney Todd by Stephen Sondheim
2009–10	Numb by Linkin Park and Jay Z	Fantasie for Piano and Orchestra by M. Kaplan
2008–09	Numb by Linkin Park and Jay Z	Requiem for a Tower by Clint Mansell
2007–08	Flamenco Fantasy by Rodriguez	James Bond medley
2006–07	Guitar Concerto by Rodriguez	Art on Ice by Edvin Marton
2005–06	Kill Bill	Art on Ice by Edvin Marton

== Competitive highlights ==
GP: Grand Prix; JGP: Junior Grand Prix

(with Kemp)

International
Event	04–05	05–06	06–07	07–08	08–09	09–10	10–11	11–12	12–13	13–14
Olympics						16th				19th
Worlds		17th	17th	15th	13th	16th	17th	19th	15th	
Europeans		11th	11th	6th	11th	11th	8th	9th	10th	13th
GP Bompard				8th						
GP Cup of China			9th							
GP NHK Trophy			7th		4th					
GP Skate America				7th		7th	8th			
GP Skate Canada							8th			
Cup of Nice							5th	9th		
Golden Spin					1st					
Ice Challenge						5th				
Nebelhorn Trophy			9th	6th		8th				7th
International: Junior
Junior Worlds	11th									
JGP Romania	5th									
JGP Serbia	9th									
National
British Champ.	1st J	1st	1st	1st	1st	1st	1st	1st	1st	2nd
Team events
Olympics										10th T
