= Caitlin Yankowskas =

American pair skater

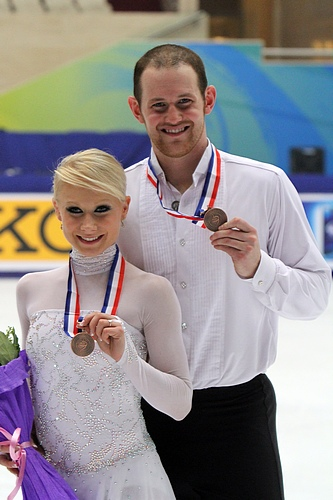
- Yankowskas in 2010 with former partner John Coughlin

Personal information
- Born: May 6, 1990 (age 36) Nashua, New Hampshire, U.S.
- Home town: Pelham, New Hampshire, U.S.
- Height: 5 ft 3 in (1.60 m)

Figure skating career
- Country: United Kingdom
- Partner: Hamish Gaman
- Skating club: Guildford IFSC Surrey
- Began skating: 1994
- Retired: September 10, 2015

Caitlin Yankowskas (born May 6, 1990) is an American retired pair skater. She competed for the United States with John Coughlin from 2007 to 2011. They are the 2010 Cup of China bronze medalists and 2011 U.S. national champions. With partner Hamish Gaman, Yankowskas skated for the United Kingdom. They are the 2015 Challenge Cup silver medalists and 2015 British national champions.

== Personal life ==
Yankowskas was born May 6, 1990, in Nashua, New Hampshire. Raised in Pelham, New Hampshire, she was homeschooled and took ballet lessons in addition to skating. She was a member of the Methuen Ballet Ensemble in Salem, New Hampshire, for five years before moving to Colorado Springs. Her father has a dental practice in Massachusetts. She has an older sister, Erica.

== Career ==
=== Early years ===
Yankowskas began skating at the age of six. She skated with Daniyel Cohen in pairs at the novice level while competing as a single skater at the same time and at the same level. She and Cohen were the 2007 U.S. novice silver medalists. She did not make it out of sectionals as a single skater. Yankowskas and Cohen were coached by Alexander Vlassov and Laura Amelina.

=== Partnership with Coughlin ===
In June 2007, Yankowskas had a tryout with new coach Dalilah Sappenfield in Colorado Springs, Colorado. Sappenfield suggested John Coughlin as a potential partner and they had a tryout in early August 2007. They placed 6th at the 2008 U.S. Championships and made their Grand Prix debut at the 2008 Skate America.

During the 2010–11 season, their Ave Maria long program was a tribute to Coughlin's mother who died in February 2010. They finished 4th at 2010 NHK Trophy and won the first Grand Prix medal, bronze, at Cup of China. At the 2011 U.S. Nationals, they placed first in the short program and then won the free program to earn their first national title.

Yankowskas and Coughlin went on to a sixth-place finish in their debut at the World Championships in April 2011; it was the best result by an American pair since 2006. After the event, Coughlin told Yankowskas that he wanted to split up. On May 4, the pair announced the end of their partnership.

=== Later partnerships ===
After leaving Sappenfield and Colorado Springs, Yankowskas moved in July 2011 to Canton, Michigan, to train with Johnny Johns and Adrienne Lenda at the Arctic Edge Ice Arena. She skated for seven weeks with Italian skater Matteo Guarise but the pairing did not go further because they were unable to agree on which country to represent. In December 2011, Yankowskas said that she still wanted to continue her pairs career.

On March 22, 2012, it was announced that Yankowskas had teamed up with Joshua Reagan. They were coached by Johnny Johns, David Kirby, and Marina Zueva in Canton, Michigan. Yankowskas and Reagan were assigned to the 2012 Cup of China and the 2012 NHK Trophy but withdrew from both events after Reagan sustained a rib injury in practice. They parted ways at the end of the season.

In May 2013, Yankowskas formed a partnership with Hamish Gaman, coached by Johnny Johns and Marina Zueva in Canton, Michigan. Competing for Great Britain, the pair placed fifth in their debut at the 2013 Ice Challenge. They went on to take the bronze medal at the 2014 British Championships. In mid-February 2014, they moved to Boston and began training under Bobby Martin and Carrie Wall at the Skating Club of Boston. After spending part of June 2014 in Montreal, coached by Bruno Marcotte and Richard Gauthier, the pair decided to move there in July. At the 2015 European Championships in Stockholm, Yankowskas/Gaman placed seventh in the short program, 14th in the free skate, and ninth overall.

On September 10, 2015, Yankowskas and Gaman announced their retirements from competitive figure skating due to lack of funding.

== Programs ==
Season	Short program	Free skating
2015–2016	All I Ask of You (from The Phantom of the Opera) by Andrew Lloyd Webber	Cinderella choreo. by Julie Marcotte
2014–2015	All I Ask of You (from The Phantom of the Opera) by Andrew Lloyd Webber	Piano Concerto No. 2 in C Minor Op. 18 by Sergei Rachmaninoff

=== With Reagan ===
Season	Short program	Free skating
2012–2013	Daphnis et Chloé by Maurice Ravel	O mio babbino caro (from Gianni Schicchi) by Giacomo Puccini

=== With Coughlin ===
Season	Short program	Free skating
2010–2011	Oblivion by Astor Piazzolla	Ave Maria by Franz Schubert
2009–2010	Sonata for Piano No. 16 by Wolfgang Amadeus Mozart	Pearl Harbor by Hans Zimmer
2008–2009	The Swan by Camille Saint-Saëns	Bram Stoker's Dracula by Wojciech Kilar
2007–2008	The Swan by Camille Saint-Saëns	Bram Stoker's Dracula by Wojciech Kilar

=== With Cohen ===
Season	Short program	Free skating
2006–2007	The Mission by Ennio Morricone	Swan Lake by Pyotr Ilyich Tchaikovsky
2005–2006	The Mission by Ennio Morricone	Don Quixote by Ludwig Minkus

== Competitive highlights ==
GP: Grand Prix; CS: Challenger Series (began in the 2014–15 season)

=== With Gaman for the United Kingdom ===
International
Event	2013–14	2014–15
Europeans		9th
CS Autumn Classic		8th
Challenge Cup		2nd
Ice Challenge	5th	
National
British Champ.	3rd	1st
WD = Withdrew

=== With Coughlin for the United States ===
International
Event	2007–08	2008–09	2009–10	2010–11
Worlds				6th
Four Continents			4th	4th
GP Cup of China				3rd
GP NHK Trophy				4th
GP Skate America		6th		
GP Skate Canada			7th	
Ice Challenge			1st	
Nebelhorn Trophy		6th		
National
U.S. Championships	6th	7th	6th	1st
