= Ivan Tretiakov =

Russian figure skater

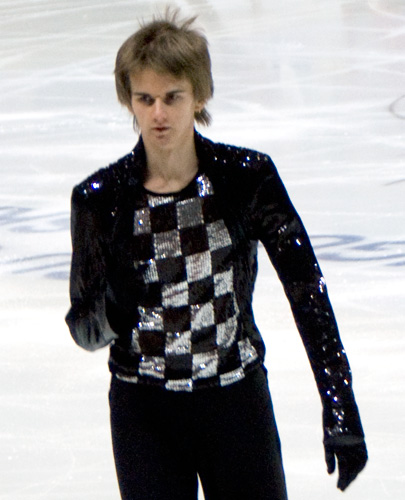
- Tretiakov in 2010

Personal information
- Full name: Ivan Pavlovich Tretiakov
- Born: 7 January 1989 (age 37) Kirov, Kirov Oblast
- Home town: Moscow
- Height: 1.77 m (5 ft 9 1/2 in)

Figure skating career
- Country: Russia
- Skating club: CSKA Moscow
- Began skating: 1994

Ivan Pavlovich Tretiakov (Russian: Иван Павлович Третьяков; born 7 January 1989) is a Russian former competitive figure skater. He won silver medals at the 2009 Nebelhorn Trophy and 2010 NRW Trophy. He made his Grand Prix debut at the 2009 Cup of Russia. He was a member of the 2009–10 Russian reserve team.

== Programs ==
| Season | Short program | Free skating |
|---|---|---|
| 2011–12 | Valse triste by Jean Sibelius | Once Upon a Time in America by Ennio Morricone |
| 2010–11 | Valse triste by Jean Sibelius | Charade by Henry Mancini |
| 2009–10 | Toccata and Fugue (modern arrangement) by Johann Sebastian Bach | Charade by Henry Mancini |

== Competitive highlights ==
GP: Grand Prix; JGP: Junior Grand Prix

International
| Event | 05–06 | 06–07 | 07–08 | 08–09 | 09–10 | 10–11 | 11–12 |
|---|---|---|---|---|---|---|---|
| GP Cup of Russia | | | | | 10th | 8th | |
| Cup of Nice | | | | | | WD | 9th |
| Finlandia Trophy | | | | | | | 6th |
| Golden Spin | | | 5th | | | | |
| Nebelhorn Trophy | | | | 12th | 2nd | 9th | |
| NRW Trophy | | | | | 10th | 2nd | |
International: Junior
| JGP Czech Rep. | | 4th | | | | | |
| JGP Estonia | 3rd | | 8th | | | | |
| JGP Poland | 6th | | | | | | |
| JGP Romania | | 4th | | | | | |
National
| Russian Champ. | | 7th | 10th | 8th | 6th | 5th | WD |
| Russian Junior | 6th | 7th | 4th | | | | |
WD: Withdrew
