= Kateryna Kostenko =

Ukrainian pair skater

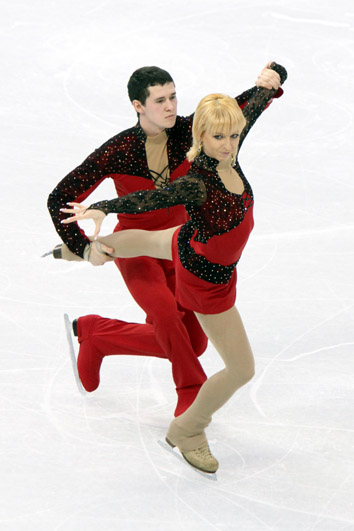
- Kostenko/Talan at the 2010 Olympics

Personal information
- Native name: Катерина Василівна Костенко
- Full name: Kateryna Vasylivna Kostenko
- Other names: Ekaterina Kostenko (Russian)
- Born: 30 June 1984 (age 42) Dnipropetrovsk, Ukrainian SSR, Soviet Union
- Height: 1.61 m (5 ft 3 1/2 in)

Figure skating career
- Country: Ukraine
- Skating club: Meteor Dnipropetrovsk
- Began skating: 1988
- Retired: 2010

Kateryna Vasylivna Kostenko (Ukrainian: Катерина Василівна Костенко, also known as Ekaterina Kostenko from Russian: Екатерина Костенко; born 30 June 1984) is a Ukrainian retired pair skater. With Roman Talan, she is the 2009 Ukrainian national champion and represented Ukraine at the 2010 Winter Olympics.

== Personal life ==
Kateryna Kostenko was born in Dnipropetrovsk, Ukrainian SSR. She married Roman Talan in 2011 and their daughter, also named Kateryna, was born on 25 February 2012.

== Career ==
Kostenko teamed up with Roman Talan when she was 21 years old and he 17. Gold medalists at the 2009 Ukrainian Championships, they represented their country at the 2008 and 2009 European Championships, 2010 World Championships, and 2010 Winter Olympics. They ended their competitive career in 2010 and began coaching in Dnipropetrovsk.

Kostenko coached Elizaveta Usmantseva / Roman Talan, who qualified a spot for Ukraine in the pairs' event at the 2014 Winter Olympics but it was later assigned to another pair.

== Programs ==
(with Talan)

Season	Short program	Free skating
2009–2010	Music by Yanni; Carmen by Georges Bizet	Gypsy music medley; Moonlight Sonata by Ludwig van Beethoven
2007–2009	Music by Yanni	Gypsy music medley

== Results ==
(with Talan)

International
Event	2007–08	2008–09	2009–10	2010–11
Winter Olympics			20th	
World Championships			22nd	
European Championships	13th	18th		
Cup of Nice			3rd	6th
Golden Spin of Zagreb		3rd		
NRW Trophy			5th	
Winter Universiade		7th		
National
Ukrainian Championships	2nd	1st	2nd	WD
WD = Withdrew
