= Hamish Gaman =

English figure skater (born 1983)

Personal information
- Born: 20 April 1983 (age 43) Chertsey, England, United Kingdom
- Home town: London, England, United Kingdom
- Height: 1.92 m (6 ft 3 1/2 in)

Figure skating career
- Country: Great Britain
- Partner: Caitlin Yankowskas; Vanessa James; Rebecca Collett
- Coach: Bruno Marcotte; Richard Gauthier; Bobby Martin; Carrie Wall; Kathryn Hudson
- Skating club: Guildford IFSC Surrey
- Began skating: 1998
- Retired: 10 September 2015

Hamish Gaman (born 20 April 1983) is an English former competitive pair skater. With partner Caitlin Yankowskas, he is the 2015 Challenge Cup silver medalist and 2015 British national champion. Since 2018, he has appeared on the ITV series Dancing on Ice.

== Career ==
Gaman competed with Rebecca Collett in the 2003–04 season. They appeared at one ISU Junior Grand Prix event, placing 11th, and at the 2004 World Junior Championships, where they finished 14th. In 2007, he teamed up with Vanessa James but she ended the partnership in January 2008 to skate for France. He then worked as a coach in the U.K.

In May 2013, Gaman formed a partnership with American skater Caitlin Yankowskas, coached by Johnny Johns and Marina Zueva in Canton, Michigan. Representing the United Kingdom, they earned minimum technical scores at the 2013 Ice Challenge. The pair went on to take the bronze medal at the 2014 British Championships. In mid-February 2014, they moved to Boston and began training under Bobby Martin and Carrie Wall at the Skating Club of Boston. After spending part of June 2014 in Montreal, coached by Bruno Marcotte and Richard Gauthier, the pair decided to move there in July. At the 2015 European Championships in Stockholm, Yankowskas/Gaman placed seventh in the short program, 14th in the free skate, and ninth overall.

On 10 September 2015, Yankowskas and Gaman announced their retirements from competitive figure skating due to lack of funding.

=== Dancing on Ice ===
In 2018, Gaman joined the cast of the ITV competition series Dancing on Ice as a professional skater. In series 10, his celebrity partner was Olympic athlete Perri Shakes-Drayton. They were eliminated on 28 January 2018, after a skate-off with Lemar and Melody Le Moal. In the eleventh series, he was partnered with singer Saara Aalto. They finished in third place after making it into the final.

For the twelfth series, Gaman was partnered with model and actress Caprice Bourret. After their first performance, Oscar Peter replaced Gaman as her partner but Gaman continued to appear in group performances on the show. Deciding to withdraw in mid-February, Gaman stated, "The past three and a half months have been the worst of my life, and I'm struggling." He said that "untrue stories are continually being fed to the press by a 'source'."

== Personal life ==
Gaman became engaged to Amelia Humfress in March 2020.

== Programs ==
=== With Yankowskas ===
Season	Short program	Free skating
2015–2016	All I Ask of You (from The Phantom of the Opera) by Andrew Lloyd Webber	Cinderella choreo. by Julie Marcotte
2014–2015	All I Ask of You (from The Phantom of the Opera) by Andrew Lloyd Webber	Piano Concerto No. 2 in C Minor Op. 18 by Sergei Rachmaninoff

=== With Collett ===
Season	Short program	Free skating
2003–2004	The Matrix by Rob Dougan	Yellow River Piano Concerto by Chengzong Yin Slovak Radio Symphony Orchestra

== Competitive highlights ==
CS: Challenger Series; JGP: Junior Grand Prix

=== With Yankowskas ===
International
Event	2013–14	2014–15
Europeans		9th
CS Autumn Classic		8th
Challenge Cup		2nd
Ice Challenge	5th	
National
British Champ.	3rd	1st

=== With Collett ===
International
Event	2003–04
World Junior Champ.	14th
JGP Poland	11th
Triglav Trophy	5th J
National
British Champ.	1st J
