= 2014 in British television =

This is a list of events that took place in 2014 related to British television.

== Events ==
=== January ===
Date	Event
1	50th anniversary of the first edition of Top of the Pops. Although an edition was aired on New Year's Eve 2013, the anniversary itself goes unmarked by the BBC because of the programme's association with the late Jimmy Savile.
1	ITV screens the terrestrial television premiere of the concluding film in the Harry Potter series, Harry Potter and the Deathly Hallows – Part 2, which is watched by an average audience of 5.1 million. It is up against the series three premiere of Sherlock on BBC One, which is watched by an average of 9.2 million.
2	It is reported that newspaper proprietor Richard Desmond has appointed Barclays Bank to advise his company on the possible sale of Channel 5.
2	Responding to a suggestion from former Channel 5 chief executive David Elstein that the BBC should introduce a subscription model for its services, the Corporation rejects the idea, saying it would exclude those who couldn't afford to pay for it.
4	It is reported that Only Fools and Horses will return for a one-off sketch that will air during the BBC's Sport Relief telethon in March.
5	Speaking on an edition of BBC One's The Andrew Marr Show, Prime Minister David Cameron declines an invitation from Scottish First Minister Alex Salmond to take part in a televised debate on Scottish independence ahead of September's referendum on the issue.
5	Actor Sir Tony Robinson and TV historian and Labour MP Tristram Hunt criticise Education Secretary Michael Gove after he wrote in a Daily Mail article that "left-wing academics" were using the television series Blackadder "to feed myths" about World War I.
6	The media regulator Ofcom concludes that news coverage of the murder of Lee Rigby didn't breach broadcasting regulations, but issues new guidelines to news outlets on giving appropriate warnings before distressing content is aired.
7	Police are investigating death threats made against five people who featured in Channel 4's documentary Benefits Street. The programme also draws criticism for stereotyping people on welfare.
7	The BBC issues a statement rejecting claims of political bias after an episode of Sherlock that aired on 5 January displayed a spoof newspaper article describing a fictional Mayor of London as "dithering, incoherent, and self-interested". Boris Johnson had suggested it was the broadcaster's raison d'être to attack Conservative politicians during an interview for London's LBC.
7	Royal Mail releases a set of stamps celebrating 60 years of children's television from the BBC, ITV, Channels 4 and 5, featuring characters such as Bagpuss, Postman Pat and Bob the Builder.
7	The Magic House celebrates its 20th anniversary.
8	The first episode of Benefits Street has attracted 300 complaints to the media regulator Ofcom and 400 to Channel 4. An online petition calling for the broadcaster to axe the remainder of the series has also been launched, so far attracting 3,000 signatures.
8	The Advertising Standards Authority bans two commercials for logbook loans company Loans2Go that feature a man dressed as an Austrian singing a jingle to the tune of "For He's a Jolly Good Fellow", deeming it an inappropriate way to sell expensive loans.
8	Conservative MP Penny Mordaunt is confirmed as one of the contestants in the upcoming series of ITV's high-diving reality show, Splash!. Reports describe her party as being "relaxed" about her participation in the show, with the politician set to donate her appearance fee to charity.
9	Channel 4 announces plans for live broadcasts from the International Space Station, including the airing of a 90-minute orbit of the Earth.
13	West Midlands-born comedian Frank Skinner tells the Birmingham Mail that he turned down an offer to narrate Channel 4's Benefits Street because he had concerns about how people from Birmingham would be portrayed, and did not wish to criticise the city.
15	Sky introduces AdSmart, a system enabling customers to receive specifically targeted advertisements depending on income, lifestyle, geography, etc.
15	Sky Sports presenter Charlie Webster speaks candidly about a sexual assault she suffered as a teenager during an interview on BBC Radio 5 Live.
15	Figures from the Department of Culture, Media and Sport indicate that jobs in the entertainment industry, which includes television, have increased by 8.6% over recent years, and now make up 5.6% of the UK workforce.
15	BBC Political Editor Nick Robinson's tablet computer interrupts a heated debate about Prime Minister's Questions on the day's edition of Daily Politics when it begins playing the Queen song "Fat Bottomed Girls".
17	Channel 4 News broadcasts the only known recording of Cambridge spy Guy Burgess. It is the first time the material, recorded in New York in 1951, has been heard publicly, after it was released to City University London researchers by the US government.
18	The first edition of weekend breakfast show Scrambled! airs over three years after Toonattik, Action Stations! and The Fluffy Club had all ended.
20	Julie Hesmondhalgh makes her final appearance in Coronation Street as Hayley Cropper. As soap's first transgender character, Hayley was a regular in the series for several years, and helped to change public attitudes towards transgender issues. She is killed off in a dramatic and emotional right to die storyline after Hesmondhalgh decided to leave the show.
22	Actress Julie Hesmondhalgh, who played Hayley Cropper in Coronation Street is presented with the award for best serial drama performance at the 2014 National Television Awards for the soap's storyline which saw the character take her own life following a diagnosis of terminal cancer.
24	The BBC confirms that John Linwood, the Corporation's former head of technology was sacked in July 2013 over the failure of the Digital Media Initiative.
27	Granada Television weatherman Fred Talbot faces several charges related to a number of alleged sexual offences in a previous profession.
29	As part of a four-year deal with Sky, ITV announces the launch of ITV Encore, a pay-TV channel exclusive to Sky that will show recent ITV series and commission new material.
29	A safety advert for Cycling Scotland is banned by the Advertising Standards Authority for showing a rider without a helmet.
29	Comedian and television presenter Jim Davidson wins the thirteenth series of Celebrity Big Brother.
30	The Scottish Football Association agrees a new four-year deal with Sky Sports to show its matches in the UK and Ireland.
30	Ashley Walters announces, during an interview with Charlie Sloth, on BBC Radio 1Xtra that his series Top Boy has been cancelled by Channel 4, after two series.

=== February ===
Date	Event
3	The Law Society of Scotland says it is in favour of allowing cameras into Scottish Courts, and suggests adopting the format used by New Zealand, where filming is left to the Judge's discretion.
3	Joe McElderry wins the first series of The Jump.
4	Launch of Channel 5 +24, a channel that airs the previous day's primetime content from Channel 5.
4	ITV airs the final edition of the game show Who Wants to Be a Millionaire? after more than 15 years. The following week, on 11 February, a compilation of some of the best bits of Millionaire is aired as part of Chris's Final Answer, a documentary taking a look at the show's history. The show is revived in 2018.
5	The BBC confirms that Sarah Smith will join BBC Scotland to present Scotland 2014, a 30-minute weeknight studio programme about the independence referendum. The programme replaces Newsnight Scotland from May, which will not return once Scotland 2014 ends in October.
5	Debut of the dark comedy anthology series Inside No. 9 on BBC Two.
6	Sarah Smith criticises Twitter users who have accused her of anti-independence bias following the previous day's announcement of her new presenting role.
6	Coronation Street actor William Roache is cleared of several accusations of historical sexual offences following a trial at Preston Crown Court. ITV says it will discuss his return to the soap.
7	Simon Cowell confirms he will return to The X Factor when the show returns later in the year.
8	In an interview for the following day's Observer, the BBC Director of Television, Danny Cohen says that the BBC will make no more all male panel shows. His announcement follows recommendations made by the BBC Trust in 2013 to boost the on screen presence of women.
13	Former BBC Radio 1 DJ and Top of the Pops presenter Dave Lee Travis is cleared of twelve historic counts of indecent assault, with the jury unable to reach a verdict on the remaining two. It is announced on 24 February that he will face a retrial on the remaining allegations, and on 28 March that he will face charges on another count.
15	Janice Hadlow will step down as joint Controller of BBC Two and BBC Four to take up a new role in charge of "special projects and seasons" at the BBC.
15	Perri Kiely, a dancer with Diversity, wins the second series of Splash!.
16	ITV confirms plans for a three-part miniseries about the rise to fame of Cilla Black, which will star Sheridan Smith as Black.
17	Figures from Broadcasters' Audience Research Board indicate that people in the UK watched an average of 3 hours 55 minutes and 30 seconds of television a day in 2013, down nine minutes from 2012.
17	It is announced that Lorraine Kelly will leave Daybreak to concentrate on presenting her self-titled show on ITV.
17	Big Tobacco advertising returns to British television for the first time in almost 50 years as British American Tobacco launches a television, press and poster campaign for its electronic cigarette brand Vype.
20	The BBC announce that David Dimbleby and Huw Edwards will share the presenting of its 2015 general election coverage, with Dimbleby fronting the programme overnight from 10 pm on 7 May, and Edwards taking over at 7 am the following day. Dimbleby will then present a special post-election edition of Question Time on the evening of 8 May. The announcement is made after media speculation Dimbleby would be replaced by Edwards, although 2015 (Dimbleby's ninth election at the helm) is expected to be the last one he will cover.
24	A camera fault on the lunchtime edition of BBC Look North leads to presenter Caroline Bilton appearing to sink into the floor. Over the following four days, footage of the incident is watched on YouTube by three million viewers.
25	Media regulator Ofcom says it has launched an investigation into Benefits Street after the show generated more than 1,700 complaints.
26	Speaking at the Oxford Media Conference, Maria Miller, the Secretary of State for Culture, Media and Sport says Scotland will lose the BBC if it votes for independence in September.
26	A third series of the BBC period crime drama Ripper Street, axed by the broadcaster in 2013, will be produced in Ireland by Amazon for its video on-demand service.
28	Actress Sheridan Smith will play journalist Lisa Lynch is a BBC adaptation of Lynch's 2010 book, The C-Word, which chronicles her fight against breast cancer.

=== March ===
Date	Event
2	Tim Pigott-Smith, who plays Prime Minister H. H. Asquith in BBC drama 37 Days, tells The Andrew Marr Show that television needs "more informative drama".
3	Susanna Reid leaves BBC Breakfast to become a presenter on ITV's Daybreak, which will relaunch later in the year as Good Morning Britain. She will be joined by Ben Shephard, Charlotte Hawkins and Sean Fletcher.
3	EastEnders villain Nick Cotton, last seen on screen in 2009, is to be killed off, it is confirmed, his death occurring off screen. The episode of the soap featuring his funeral, shown on 27 March, is watched by 6.7 million viewers.
5	A celebrity campaign is launched to save BBC Three amid reports that the channel will become an online-only channel to cut costs.
6	BBC Director-General Tony Hall confirms BBC Three will close in Autumn 2015, and shift its content online. Subject to the approval of the BBC Trust, the plans will also allow an extra £30m to be spent on drama for BBC One and a BBC One +1 service.
6	An audience member storms out of the studio midway through the evening's edition of Question Time after engaging in a heated debate about immigration with panel member David Aaronovitch.
7	Ministers are considering decriminalising non-payment of the TV licence, making it a civil offence instead, the Daily Telegraph reports.
7	Research conducted by TV Licensing indicates that 10% of viewers in Northern Ireland watch television on a screen larger than 50 inches, a higher proportion than does the rest of the UK, where the average is 3%.
7	Channel 4 shows the first of ten days of live coverage of the 2014 Winter Paralympics. This is the first time that the Winter Paralympic Games has ever been seen on British television.
9	The ninth and final series of Dancing on Ice, titled Dancing on Ice: All Stars, is won by actor Ray Quinn and dance partner Maria Filippov. The programme also sees Jayne Torvill and Christopher Dean make their final television performance of Boléro, a routine they made famous at the 1984 Winter Olympics. Dancing on Ice would later return in 2018 before axing again in 2025.
10	Linking the licence fee to the rate of inflation is among several suggestions in a BBC commissioned report into post-2020 funding for the broadcaster.
10	Singer Cheryl Cole will return as a judge on The X Factor for its eleventh series, replacing Sharon Osbourne.
11	An updated version of BBC iPlayer is unveiled by the BBC, with extra features and content.
12	An edition of BBC Three's live debate show, Free Speech attracts criticism after dropping a question asking "When will it be right to be Muslim and gay?". BBC Three says the decision was taken amid security concerns after the show's venue, Birmingham Central Mosque, received threats.
15	Presenter Kate Garraway confirms she will be part of the Good Morning Britain team when the programme launches later in the year.
17	The BBC apologises for failing to fully brief students from the London School of Economics about the risks of participating in a 2013 Panorama documentary about North Korea after the BBC Trust found the broadcaster had "failed to consider a number of important issues and risks, and failed to deal with them appropriately".
17	In an address to BAFTA, the comedian Lenny Henry calls for funds to be ringfenced to boost the representation of black, Asian and minority ethnic people in the broadcasting industry.
18	BBC News announces the appointment of ITV News Social Affairs Editor Penny Marshall as its new Education Editor. At the same time, BBC Chief Economics Correspondent Hugh Pym is appointed as their new Health Editor.
19	Actress Lisa Hammond is to join EastEnders as market trader Donna Yates, the show's second regular character with a disability. The first was Adam Best, played by David Proud in 2009–10.
21	Government ministers give their formal backing to decriminalising non-payment of the TV licence.
21	Highlights of Sport Relief 2014 include an Only Fools and Horses sketch involving David Beckham and a performance of Especially for You by Kylie Minogue and Jason Donovan, believed to be their first live performance of the 1988 hit for 25 years. The telethon also raises a record £51,242,186, beating the £50.4m raised in 2012.
21	Research commissioned by the campaign group Action on Junk Food Marketing suggests children are being exposed to a high level of advertising for unhealthy food, and wants commercials for junk food banned from prime-time television.
21	Kylie Minogue says she will leave The Voice at the end of the current series to concentrate on tour commitments. She confirms her decision to leave on 11 April.
25	Non-payment of the television license fee is decriminalised by Government.
31	Two days after same sex marriage is made legal in England and Wales, Channel 4 airs Our Gay Wedding: The Musical, a documentary featuring Benjamin Till and Nathan Taylor, one of the first couples to marry under the changes in the law, and who decided to celebrate the occasion by turning it into a television musical.

=== April ===
Date	Event
1	A timeshift Cartoon Network +1 is relaunched, replacing Cartoon Network Too.
2	David Dimbleby chairs The European Union: In or Out in which Lib Dem leader Nick Clegg and UKIP leader Nigel Farage debate Britain's future in Europe.
2	The BBC confirms that its school drama Waterloo Road will end in 2015, following the conclusion of series 10.
2	Radio and television presenter Sandi Toksvig questions the logic of a BBC pledge to ban all-male panel shows, suggesting in a TV Times interview that more female presenters would be a better idea as it would encourage greater female participation in such programmes.
2	Ricky Norwood, who plays Fatboy in EastEnders, is suspended from the series for two months after online footage emerged of him smoking cannabis.
3	BSkyB, one of Scotland's largest private sector employers, says it has no plans to make any business changes if Scotland votes for independence in September.
4	Sir Bruce Forsyth announces that he is stepping down from hosting the regular live shows of Strictly Come Dancing after 10 years but will continue the role for pre-recorded specials.
4	The BBC Trust approves plans to extend the time content is made available on BBC iPlayer from seven to thirty days.
5	The quiz show Fifteen to One returns to Channel 4 with Sandi Toksvig as host.
5	Jermain Jackman wins the third series of The Voice, becoming the show's first male winner.
7	Model and journalist Peaches Geldof is found dead at her home in Wrotham, Kent.
7	Trinity College, Cambridge wins the 2013–14 series of University Challenge, beating Somerville College, Oxford 240–135.
9	Sajid Javid is appointed as Culture Secretary following the resignation of Maria Miller.
9	The Advertising Standards Agency bans a television advert for Wonga.com which it deems has misled viewers about the amount of interest rates charged on payday loans.
9	EastEnders confirms that Patsy Palmer is to leave the series in the autumn after playing Bianca Jackson for 21 years.
11	Kim Shillinglaw is named Controller of BBC Two and BBC Four, replacing Janice Hadlow.
13	The BBC announces plans to mark the 70th anniversary of the D-Day landings with a series of programmes on television and radio.
16	Channel 4 is to increase its arts coverage after receiving £3 million in funding from Arts Council England.
16	Speaking on BBC Radio 5 Live, Kieran Smith, Executive Producer of Love Productions, confirms plans for a follow-up programme to Benefits Street, provisionally titled Immigration Street, but says Channel 4 are yet to commission it.
17	Bid Shopping goes into administration, forcing its channels Shop at Bid and Price Drop off air.
18	Launch of the "Who Killed Lucy Beale?" storyline in EastEnders, a whodunit plot that will run throughout the rest of 2014 and into early 2015, with the resolution timed to coincide with the soap's 30th anniversary.
20	50th anniversary of the launch of BBC Two.
20	BBC News reports that Miranda Hart is in early talks with the BBC about the possibility of reviving The Generation Game. The broadcaster confirms on 17 August that the show will return, and that Hart will take on the presenting role; however, although a pilot episode is filmed later this year, Hart withdraws from the project.
21	Debut of BBC One's three-part adaptation of Daphne Du Maurier's novel Jamaica Inn. The first episode attracts several hundred complaints from viewers because of its poor sound quality. The BBC later apologises, saying it could not adjust the sound while the episode was on air, but will do so for the remaining two instalments.
21	ITV premieres the Tommy Cooper television biopic Not Like That, Like This in which the late comedian is depicted as a wife beating alcoholic. The film has attracted criticism from Cooper's daughter, Vicki, who says it is a false account of his life and that he did not hit anybody.
21	The Lark Ascending composed by Ralph Vaughan Williams, which featured in Coronation Street during Hayley Cropper's death scene, is voted Britain's favourite piece of classical music by listeners of Classic FM.
22	Advertisements appear in the day's newspapers advising people who were abused by Jimmy Savile how they can claim compensation. Claims can be made against Savile's estate, the BBC and the National Health Service, with payments capped at £60,000.
22	As ITV prepares to launch Good Morning Britain, Nick Owen, a former presenter on TV-am says viewers are alienated from watching breakfast television by reports of presenters receiving high salaries.
23	Andy Wilman, the executive producer of Top Gear expresses regret over what he describes as a "light-hearted" remark made by Jeremy Clarkson on its Burma special that aired in March. Clarkson had used the word "slope" as an Asian man crossed a newly built bridge spanning the River Kwai, leading to the programme being accused of racism. Commenting on the bridge, Clarkson had observed "That is a proud moment. But there's a slope on it." Co-presenter Richard Hammond replied "You're right. It's definitely higher on that side." Wilman says that at the time they were unaware the term, not widely known in the UK, is considered offensive in some cultures. On 6 May, Ofcom launches an investigation to determine whether Clarkson's remark breached its regulations.
23	Award-winning journalist Nikki Fox is appointed as BBC News's first Disability Correspondent.
25	Aled Jones and Kate Garraway present the final edition of ITV's Daybreak. Jones begins presenting a new weekend breakfast show, Weekend from the following day.
25	Irish actress Pauline McLynn, who played housekeeper Mrs Doyle in Channel 4 comedy Father Ted will have a "recurring guest role" in EastEnders as Dot Cotton's daughter-in-law, it is confirmed.
27	The Wind in the Willows celebrates its 30th anniversary.
28	Good Morning Britain makes its debut on ITV. The first edition has an average audience of 800,000, just over half of the 1.5 million who tune into BBC Breakfast, but an improvement on ratings for Daybreak. However, by 30 April audiences have fallen to 600,000, the average Daybreak viewership.
29	A BBC Trust report into BBC News content finds it is "trusted and highly regarded by audiences" but that some viewers perceive it as "distant".
30	An Ofcom report highlights the delay between spoken and subtitled content in live programming, but says the accuracy and words per minute of subtitling is very good.
30	Jeremy Paxman announces he will leave Newsnight in June after 25 years with the programme.

=== May ===
Date	Event
1	Richard Desmond agrees to sell Channel 5 to Viacom for £450 million, subject to regulatory approval.
1	Jeremy Clarkson rejects claims in a Daily Mirror article that he used the word "nigger" while reciting the children's nursery rhyme "Eeny, meeny, miny, moe" as he filmed an episode of Top Gear. After the newspaper subsequently releases footage of the incident, which occurred some time ago, Clarkson concedes he appears to use the word, and issues an apology on video. The BBC says that it has left the presenter "in no doubt how seriously" it takes the incident. Clarkson later says the BBC has warned him he will be sacked if he makes "one more offensive remark, anywhere, at any time".
1	The BBC will provide radio, television and online coverage of the Hay Literary Festival in June, it is announced, as it takes over broadcast rights for the event from Sky Arts.
2	It is reported that Miranda Richardson and Anna Chancellor are to star in a new BBC adaptation of E. F. Benson's Mapp and Lucia novels, which will be written by Steve Pemberton.
2	BBC Two's Newsnight appoints The Guardian newspaper's investigations editor, Nick Hopkins as its investigations correspondent.
6	Chris Patten steps down as Chairman of the BBC Trust following major heart surgery.
7	ITV buys a controlling stake in US reality television company Leftfield Entertainment, the firm behind programmes such as Pawn Stars and Real Housewives of New Jersey.
7	A Party Election Broadcast by the Labour Party attracts media attention for its parody of the 1950s black-and-white film The Incredible Shrinking Man. Liberal Democrat leader Nick Clegg is portrayed as The Un-Credible Shrinking Man in a comedy piece that sees him being treated with contempt by his coalition partners in the Conservative Party, shrinking to the size of a doll as he is forced to abandon his party's election manifesto policies, and finally being chased by the Downing Street cat. The Liberal Democrats release their own black-and-white film in response, portraying Labour leader Ed Miliband as the "incredible silent man".
10	Claudia Winkleman is named as Bruce Forsyth's replacement as presenter of Strictly Come Dancing.
10	Austrian drag artist Conchita Wurst wins the 2014 Eurovision Song Contest, staged in Copenhagen and broadcast in the UK by the BBC, with "Rise Like a Phoenix". The UK entry, "Children of the Universe", written and sung by Molly, places 17th.
11	Alan Hansen co-presents his final Match of the Day after 22 years.
12	In an interview with The Daily Telegraph, television presenters and husband-and-wife team Richard Madeley and Judy Finnigan speak candidly about a suicide pact they have made in case one of them is diagnosed with a terminal illness.
13	Caroline Aherne is recovering after receiving treatment for lung cancer, it is reported. The news comes as Macmillan Cancer Support says the actress and writer will speak at an event in Manchester aimed at improving care for cancer patients on 26 June.
15	YouTube, The Daily Telegraph and The Guardian announce joint plans to host an online leaders' debate ahead of the 2015 general election. Although it could be televised by other media, such an event would not be governed by the broadcasting rules covering organisations such as the BBC, and could allow greater scope in terms of the party leaders who take part.
16	Following a trial at Preston Crown Court, former BBC presenter Stuart Hall is cleared of two charges of rape, but convicted of an indecent assault. On 23 May he is sentenced to a further 30 months imprisonment.
16	Comedian Frank Skinner will have a guest role in an episode of the eighth series of Doctor Who, it is reported.
16	Ping Coombes wins the 2014 series of MasterChef.
20	An original Humpty toy used in the BBC children's series Play School sells at auction for £6,250.
21	William Roache's return to Coronation Street is confirmed. He will begin filming again within two weeks, with his character, Ken Barlow, reappearing on screen from August.
22	The final edition of Newsnight Scotland is broadcast on BBC Two Scotland.
23	Ofcom has fined sports channel ESPN £120,000 for failing to meet the 5% audio description requirements for its output.
27	Khali Best, who plays Dexter Hartman in EastEnders, has been suspended from the soap for three months, the BBC confirms.
28	243 viewers have complained to the BBC about the poor sound quality on the first episode of Irish detective series Quirke, which made its BBC One debut on 25 May. Writer Andrew Davies later tells Radio Times that he watched the programme with the subtitles on after his wife told him she could not hear the dialogue.
29	BBC One's Question Time is broadcast from the newly built Heathrow Terminal 2 ahead of its official opening.
31	Peppa Pig celebrates its 10th anniversary.

=== June ===
Date	Event
2	A recording of the thought-to-be lost 1957 BBC television play Requiem for a Heavyweight, which sees Sean Connery playing a former boxer in his first lead role, has been unearthed by the film's director.
2	Sam Bickley is appointed as acting editor of BBC Three, and will take up the position when Zai Bennett relinquishes the role to join Sky Atlantic in July.
5	The BBC announce plans to screen three football matches from the 2014 World Cup in 4K resolution to a limited number of televisions.
6	The i newspaper reports that the BBC and Channel 4 lost 12% of their viewers in the 23–34 age range between 2010 and 2013, compared with an average of 7% among other broadcasters.
7	The BBC and ITV have retained the broadcast rights for the FIFA World Cup, having signed a deal to air the 2018 and 2022 tournaments from Russia and Qatar.
7	Operatic boy band Collabro win the eighth series of Britain's Got Talent.
9	Comedian Rik Mayall dies suddenly at home. His wife later says he collapsed after returning from his morning run and "suffered an acute cardiac event" before his death.
9	ITV launches the pay-TV channel ITV Encore, its first venture into subscription television since the collapse of ITV Digital more than a decade earlier. The channel will showcase the "best of contemporary British ITV drama", with series such as Broadchurch and Poirot. ITV also plans to commission original drama for the channel, in a similar vein to HBO in the United States.
11	Former Spice Girl Mel B is confirmed as a judge on the forthcoming series of The X Factor, joining Simon Cowell, Cheryl Cole and Louis Walsh.
12	The 2014 World Cup begins in Brazil, but viewers watching the opening match between Croatia and Brazil on ITV Player miss key parts of the game because of technical problems caused by a high volume of people watching online.
12	Addressing the Better Together Campaign, the cross-party group arguing for Scotland to stay as part of the United Kingdom in the forthcoming referendum, former Prime Minister Gordon Brown says that plans for a state-funded Scottish Broadcasting Service in an independent Scotland would require a significantly higher TV licence fee to enable it to produce the same quantity of programming currently put out by the BBC.
13	Granada Television weatherman Fred Talbot is charged with a further count of sexual assault, bringing the total number of sex offence charges he faces to eleven. The historic charges relate to when Talbot was a school teacher at Altrincham Grammar School for Boys.
14	Italy beat England 2–1 in their opening World Cup match, a game aired on BBC One and on which commentary is provided by former Manchester United player Phil Neville. Neville later receives criticism from viewers for his lack of emotion and "monotone" style, while several hundred complaints are made to the BBC.
16	Ofcom launches an investigation into the BBC's Daily Politics after Conservative MP Nick Herbert swore live on air on the 22 May edition of the show while quoting another guest.
16	British actress Sheree Murphy has joined the cast of the Australian soap opera Neighbours, it is reported.
17	1980s cartoon series Danger Mouse will be reprised for CBBC in 2015, it is announced.
18	After 25 years, Jeremy Paxman steps down as presenter of Newsnight after fronting his final edition.
20	Conservative MP Michael Fabricant apologises after tweeting that he would punch left-wing journalist Yasmin Alibhai-Brown in the throat if he ever had to appear on a discussion programme with her while watching a heated Channel 4 News debate between Alibhai-Brown and right-wing commentator Rod Liddle the previous evening.
20	The former Coronation Street set in Central Manchester, which was vacated earlier in the year when production was moved to Salford Quays, has been granted a licence to hold weddings, and will be opened up as a marriage venue. Guided tours of the complex are also being held.
22	Scottish First Minister Alex Salmond agrees to take part in a televised debate on Scottish independence with the head of the Better Together campaign, Alistair Darling, which will be aired by STV.
23	The BBC announces the UK's largest ever political debate ahead of the referendum. 12,000 first time voters will gather at Glasgow's SSE Hydro for a BBC One debate on independence on 11 September.
24	ITV celebrity diving series Splash! is axed because of poor ratings.
26	Sony Pictures Television says it has agreed to buy CSC Media Group and its 15 channels for £107 million ($180 million).
26	ITV announces that Wendi Peters is returning to Coronation Street reprising her role as Cilla Battersby-Brown for a six-week guest stint, after seven years away. Peters last appeared as the character in the 2008 spin-off direct to DVD release Coronation Street: Out of Africa.
30	Following an investigation into the Channel 4 programme Benefits Street, Ofcom concludes that the programme did not breach the broadcasting regulations.
30	Following a trial at Southwark Crown Court, entertainer Rolf Harris is found guilty on 12 counts of indecent assault between 1968 and 1986.

=== July ===
Date	Event
2	ITV apologises after repeating an episode of Benidorm that made reference to Rolf Harris a day after he was convicted of indecent assault.
4	Rolf Harris is sentenced to five years and nine months in prison after being found guilty of twelve counts of indecent assault, but will not face trial over the allegations of downloading sexual images of children.
4	A study by researchers at the University of Limerick has noted the high proportion of appearances of junk food on children's television programmes in the UK and Ireland.
4	Research published by Ofcom shows a dramatic fall in the percentage of viewers who believe there is too much sex, violence and bad language on television, falling from 55% in 2008 to 35% in 2013.
7	Vanessa Feltz condemns "vile" negative social media comments made in response to her claims she was sexually assaulted by Rolf Harris during a live broadcast of The Big Breakfast in 1996.
7	Doctor Who producers ask the show's fans not to share five scripts from the new series that have been leaked onto the internet two months before it is due to be broadcast. An investigation is also launched into the incident.
8	The BBC announces that current BBC Radio 5 Live presenter Victoria Derbyshire will join the BBC News Channel. Derbyshire is scheduled to leave the radio station as part of a shakeup of its schedules.
9	Rhod Gilbert is named as presenter of Never Mind the Buzzcocks, joining the programme from its 28th series and becoming its first regular presenter since Simon Amstell left in 2008.
9	BBC Two brings back the "1991–2001" idents (based around a sans-serif '2') for the channel's 50th anniversary. Since then, the "1991–2001" idents have extended beyond their timeframe, meaning that they are now permanent and will air into 2015 and beyond.
10	An edition of BBC One's Question Time from Inverness, Scotland, is believed by its producers to be the first to feature a panel without any politicians.
13	The family of Conservative MP Airey Neave have said that an episode of the Channel 4 series Utopia that fictionalises his death should not be aired. Neave was killed by a bomb planted by the Irish National Liberation Army in 1979, but the series attributes his death to a secret MI5 unit.
13	BBC One and ITV air the 2014 World Cup Final from Rio de Janeiro. On BBC One, the coverage is the final to be presented by Alan Hansen before he retires. The simulcast is watched by 20.6 million viewers, with 16.7 million tuning into BBC One and 3.9 million watching ITV.
14	BBC Breakfast confirms that Naga Munchetty will leave BBC World News to join the presenting team full-time to present shows alongside Charlie Stayt from Thursdays to Saturdays. Bill Turnbull and Louise Minchin will continue to present from Mondays to Wednesdays.
15	BBC journalists announce plans for a 24-hour strike beginning at midday on 23 July after failing to reach agreement with BBC management over pay levels, which the National Union of Journalists says have fallen by 10% in real terms since 2009. The strike is called off on 18 July following talks between union officials and BBC Director-General Tony Hall which sees BBC journalists given an improved pay offer.
16	Ofcom has fined the Discovery Channel £100,000 for showing Deadly Women, a series about female killers, before the 9 pm watershed.
17	BBC Director of News James Harding announces that the BBC's news department will lose a further 415 jobs as part of cost-cutting measures.
17	BBC Worldwide has blamed recent online leaks of Doctor Who scripts and footage on a "damaging mistake".
17	Al Jazeera English announce plans to move their London studios and offices from Knightsbridge where they have been since the channel's founding to The Shard.
18	Glenn Thomas, a former BBC journalist who went on to become a media officer with the World Health Organization, is confirmed as having been among 298 people killed in the previous day's crash of Malaysia Airlines Flight 17, which came down in Eastern Ukraine.
18	Research by Ofcom indicates that Hollyoaks has superseded EastEnders as the UK's most violent soap. Hollyoaks had an average of 11.5 violent scenes per hour in 2013, up from 2.1 in 2002, while over the same period, violent scenes in EastEnders fell from 6.1 per hour in 2002 to 2.1 in 2013.
18	The British High Court orders Fox Television Studios to rename the US series title Glee in the United Kingdom to another title after it sided with Comic Enterprises, the owners of The Glee Club comedy chain, due to a breach of trademark infringement and copyright issues over the "Glee" name. Fox, claiming that changing the name "would adversely affect fans' enjoyment of Glee in the U.K.," has filed an appeal to challenge this decision.
18	Sophie Thompson wins the 2014 series of Celebrity MasterChef.
19	As the country gears up for the 2014 Commonwealth Games from Scotland, BBC One airs Live at Edinburgh Castle, a concert from Edinburgh Castle featuring artists such as Smokey Robinson, Kaiser Chiefs, Culture Club, Ella Henderson and Katherine Jenkins.
19	BBC iPlayer and other BBC online services are hit by technical problems, preventing users from accessing the content.
20	Monty Python present the last of 10 reunion shows at London's O2 Arena, the last time the comedy team plan to work together. The show is also aired on Gold.
20	An article in the Daily Star Sunday claims that Jill Dando investigated allegations of a paedophile ring at the BBC during the mid-1990s, but that no action was taken on her findings. The BBC says it has seen no evidence to support the claims.
21	It is announced that Evan Davis will join Newsnight following Jeremy Paxman's departure. Davis will leave his current role as a presenter of BBC Radio 4's Today programme in the Autumn to take up the new role.
21	A trial in which singer and television personality Tulisa Contostavlos is accused of brokering a drugs deal collapses after the judge tells the court he believes the main prosecution witness has lied under oath.
21	Ofcom has received 110 complaints from viewers about an item shown on Sky News the previous day during which reporter Colin Brazier picked up items from a suitcase at the crash site of Malaysia Airlines Flight 17. In a subsequent article for The Guardian, Brazier writes that he was wrong to handle the items.
21	King Bert Productions, a TV production company owned by comedians David Walliams and Miranda Hart, and television producer Jo Sargent, signs a deal with BBC Worldwide to sell its programmes internationally.
22	Residents in Southampton launch a campaign to stop Channel 4's plans to film its Benefits Street follow up, Immigration Street, in the city.
23	An inquest into the death of Peaches Geldof returns a verdict of drugs-related death after hearing how the model and journalist had fought a two-year battle against heroin addiction prior to her death in April.
23	The BBC will stream the Commonwealth Games in High-frame-rate (HFR) and ultra-high-definition (UHD) in London and Glasgow to test new ways of covering live events.
23	The 2014 Commonwealth Games opening ceremony in Glasgow is watched by an average audience of 7.6 million, peaking at 9.42 million.
25	BSkyB is to pay £4.9bn to buy Sky Italia and Sky Germany from 21st Century Fox. The move will enable the creation of Sky Europe, and free up resources to allow Fox to pursue plans to launch a takeover bid for Time Warner. Fox subsequently announces on 5 August that it is withdrawing its bid for Time Warner.
25	Tulisa Contostavlos is fined £200 after being convicted of assaulting a celebrity blogger at the 2013 V Festival in August last year.
25	A house in Barry, South Wales, described as "the spiritual home" of the BBC series Gavin & Stacey, is on the market for £125,000, BBC Radio 1's Newsbeat reports.
28	Ofcom rules that Top Gear's Burma special broke the broadcasting rules after Jeremy Clarkson used a racial slur during the programme.
29	EastEnders confirms that John Altman will reprise his role as the soap's ultimate villain Nick Cotton after the previous evening's episode revealed that the character's death was faked.
30	The Attorney General's office announces that Rolf Harris's sentence will not be referred to the Court of Appeal despite 150 complaints about its leniency.
30	Lawyers for the Jimmy Savile Charitable Trust are to launch a legal challenge against the compensation scheme under which the Savile estate, NHS and the BBC are liable for compensation payments to Savile's victims. The case will be heard by the Court of Appeal later in the year.
30	Ofcom grants KMTV a licence to run a local television service in the Maidstone and Tonbridge areas of Kent.

=== August ===
Date	Event
1	The Judicial Office confirms that Rolf Harris has applied for permission to appeal against his conviction for indecent assault.
3	BBC One airs the Commonwealth Games closing ceremony which features a performance by Kylie Minogue. Overnight viewing figures released the following day indicate the event is watched by 6.8 million.
4	The BBC broadcast a series of memorial events in Great Britain and Belgium marking 100 years since Britain's entry into the First World War. BBC Two broadcasts a memorial service at Westminster Abbey, culminating at 11 pm, the hour at which Britain's entry was confirmed.
4	William Roache returns to Coronation Street as Ken Barlow.
4	UKTV launches its video on demand service UKTV Play.
5	Alex Salmond and Alistair Darling take part in a televised debate on Scottish independence held by STV at Glasgow's Royal Conservatoire of Scotland. The debate is streamed live online through STV Player, but viewers outside Scotland report encountering problems trying to watch the feed.
7	Protesters in Southampton pelt a television film crew working on Channel 4's planned Immigration Street with eggs.
8	The BBC and Sky News are among broadcasters to air a Disasters Emergency Committee appeal for people affected by the Israel–Gaza conflict, having declined to air a similar appeal in 2009. The appeal raises £4.5 million during its first 24 hours.
8	Birmingham City TV goes into administration before its planned launch. The channel was due to go on air in November, but its license will now be re-auctioned.
9	Tumble, a show featuring 10 celebrities who take part in gymnastics to win the votes of the public, debuts on BBC One.
13	Charlotte Smith is to return as a presenter on BBC One's Countryfile, covering for Tom Heap while he takes a holiday in September. Smith was one of several older female presenters dropped from the show when it was moved to an evening slot in 2009.
13	The BBC confirms that BBC One Scotland will air a debate on Scottish independence featuring Alex Salmond and Alistair Darling on 25 August.
15	Police deny that information was leaked to the BBC after the broadcaster received advanced details of a planned police search of the home of singer Cliff Richard, which took place the previous day. South Yorkshire Police subsequently make a complaint to the BBC accusing it of breaching its own broadcasting guidelines.
15	Producers of Downton Abbey have removed a promotional image from ITV's Instagram account because it included a plastic bottle, an object invented several years after the period drama is set.
15	The former Coronation Street set at Manchester's Quay Street is to be demolished and redeveloped as a housing and retail complex. The site was purchased by builders Allied London, who allowed Granada Television to use it as a temporary visitor's attraction, which is scheduled to close in October.
15	Helen Wood wins the fifteenth series of Big Brother.
18	UKIP MEP Janice Atkinson is forced to apologise after describing a Thai constituent and party member as a "ting tong from somewhere" during an interview on the previous Friday's edition of BBC One's South East Today.
18	Ofcom launches an investigation into Colin Brazier's Sky News report from the crash site of Malaysia Airlines Flight 17 after receiving 205 complaints about the 20 July broadcast.
19	Ofcom launches an investigation into Gold's live broadcast of the Monty Python farewell show following complaints about the airing of bad language before the 9 pm watershed.
19	Writing in The Guardian, former BBC Director General John Birt discusses the "devastating" impact he feels a Yes vote in the forthcoming Scottish independence referendum would have on the BBC, and that Scottish viewers would have to pay to receive BBC services. His views are echoed in a speech the following day by Margaret Curran, the Shadow Secretary of State for Scotland.
21	BBC Director General Tony Hall says the broadcaster "acted appropriately" over its news coverage of the police raid on Cliff Richard's house.
21	The Iain Banks novel Stonemouth is to be adapted into a two part television drama for BBC Scotland in a joint project between the broadcaster and production company Slate North.
22	The Home Affairs Select Committee has summoned BBC bosses and representatives of South Yorkshire Police to answer questions about how the BBC knew in advance about the raid on a property belonging to Cliff Richard.
22	50th anniversary of the first edition of Match of the Day.
23	Deep Breath, the feature length opening episode of series eight of Doctor Who, which sees Peter Capaldi make his debut as the Twelfth Doctor, is screened simultaneously in cinemas as it airs on BBC One.
25	BBC One Scotland airs a second televised debate on Scottish independence, featuring Alex Salmond and Alistair Darling.
27	Meyne Wyatt, the first indigenous Australian actor to have a leading role in Neighbours, makes his debut in the soap as Nate Kinski.
27	Controversy hits The Great British Bake Off when Iain Waters is disqualified after he throws his melted Baked Alaska in the bin, prompting viewers to express their anger on the culprit Diana Beard who is disqualified by the producers the following week.
28	Ofcom reveals that six viewers have complained after a lesbian kiss was shown in the opening episode of the latest series of Doctor Who, but says it will not launch an investigation. The scene, featuring Madame Vastra and Jenny Flint (played by Neve McIntosh and Catrin Stewart), had prompted concern among the complainants that the material was inappropriate, although it was generally received positively by the majority of the episode's seven million viewers.
29	The Specials, a UK web series about a group of young adults with learning disabilities in Brighton that failed to attract a British television commission, has been picked up by the Oprah Winfrey Network in the United States, it is reported.
29	Channel 5 airs Episode 6000 of Home and Away.
30	Rona Fairhead, a former head of Financial Times Group, is appointed as Chair of the BBC Trust, becoming the first woman to hold the post.

=== September ===
Date	Event
1	BBC staff vote to take strike action in an ongoing disagreement over the broadcaster's plans to cut 500 jobs.
4	The BBC says it has removed a scene from the Doctor Who episode "Robot of Sherwood" in which a character is beheaded following the recent beheadings of two U.S. hostages held by the Islamic State jihadist group.
4	Judy Finnigan will return to daytime television as a panellist for Loose Women when the series returns on 8 September.
5	Channel 4 game show Countdown reaches its 6000th edition, earning itself a place in the Guinness Book of Records as the longest running programme of its type.
7	Bruce Forsyth hands over the Strictly Come Dancing presenting role to Tess Daly and Claudia Winkleman with a dance routine to kick off the show as the programme returns for its eleventh series.
10	The BBC begins airing the first Invictus Games, a Paralympic-style multi-sport event for wounded service personnel. Events kick off with the opening ceremony in London.
11	Former actor Giles Watling, best known for his role as Oswald in the television sitcom Bread, is selected as the Conservative Party candidate to fight the forthcoming Clacton by-election on 9 October.
11	Scottish First Minister Alex Salmond is involved in a heated exchange with BBC journalist Nick Robinson during a referendum press conference in Edinburgh after Salmond accuses the Treasury of leaking market sensitive information outside of trading hours. Robinson had reported plans by The Royal Bank of Scotland to relocate to England in the event of a Yes vote the previous evening, causing some overnight negative market reaction in Asia, and prompting the First Minister to call for an investigation into the source of the leak, which he felt the BBC should co-operate with. An official announcement from the bank was due to be made at 7.00 am on 11 September.
11	BBC One airs Scotland Decides: The Big, Big Debate in which 16 and 17-year-old first time voters are given the opportunity to quiz a Question Time-style panel of politicians about issues surrounding the Independence referendum.
12	US actor Gary Busey wins the fourteenth series of Celebrity Big Brother, becoming the first American to take the accolade.
13	Actress and director Samantha Morton tells The Guardian that she suffered sexual abuse while in care as a child, saying she has decided to speak out in the wake of the Rotherham child sexual exploitation scandal.
13	Bobby Lockwood and gymnastics partner Kristin Allen win the first and only series of Tumble.
14	Demonstrators gather outside BBC Scotland's Glasgow headquarters to protest against what they perceive to be the BBC's anti-independence bias.
14	The closing ceremony of the inaugural Invictus Games takes place in London, with a music concert at Olympic Park featuring artists and groups such as Bryan Adams, Ellie Goulding, James Blunt and the Kaiser Chiefs.
16	Two days before the Scottish independence referendum, BBC One airs Scotland Decides: The Dimbleby Interviews in which David Dimbleby conducts an in-depth interview with Gordon Brown for the No campaign and Alex Salmond for the Yes campaign.
16	BBC One airs a special edition of Crimewatch marking 30 years of the series.
16	In an interview with the Radio Times, actor David Morrissey criticises the "intern culture" of acting that he says is excluding people from working-class backgrounds from entering the profession.
18	Comedian Alexander Armstrong is to become the voice of Danger Mouse, taking over from David Jason when the series returns in 2015.
18–19	The BBC, ITV and Sky News provide coverage of the results of the Scottish independence referendum as the results are counted overnight. Shortly after 5.00 am, it is announced that Scotland has voted to reject secession from the United Kingdom.
19	Dennis Waterman, best known for his roles as DS George Carter in The Sweeney and Terry McCann in Minder announces he will leave the role of Gerry Standing as the last original cast member of BBC detective series New Tricks in 2015.
22	The BBC apologises after seven viewers complained about an edition of TOTP2 that aired on 13 September on BBC Two which included a brief clip of Jimmy Savile from a 1971 edition of Top of the Pops. The footage has since been edited out of the programme.
23	Following a trial at Southwark Crown Court, broadcaster Dave Lee Travis is convicted of indecently assaulting a television researcher, but cleared of two further sexual assault charges. On 26 September, he is given a three-month suspended sentence.
23	The BBC Trust introduces a current affairs quota to safeguard news programming, stipulating that BBC One's peak time schedule must include a minimum of 40 hours of current affairs programming annually.
23	Rita Ora will be a panelist on the fourth series of The Voice, replacing Kylie Minogue.
23	The local TV channel Sheffield Live goes on air at 6 pm. The channel is available on Freeview and cable in the Sheffield area.
23	A power outage at the BBC's Plymouth studios affects output from BBC South West, requiring the evening's edition of BBC Spotlight to be broadcast as a joint programme with BBC Points West.
24	Channel 4 confirms that Jeremy Paxman will be hosting their coverage of the 2015 general election.
26	Jonathan King, the music mogul who was convicted of child sex offences in 2001, is to appear in Genesis Together, a BBC documentary about the group Genesis, a band that he discovered and nurtured. The BBC says King's appearance in the documentary reflects the "significant role" he played in the group's success.
28	BBC One's Midlands news programme, Midlands Today, celebrates its 50th anniversary.
29	Newsnight is relaunched with Evan Davis as presenter, who has promised a less combative interviewing style than Jeremy Paxman. The edition, in which Davis interviews David Cameron, is watched by 549,000 viewers. 606,000 tune in the following day for an interview with Boris Johnson.

=== October ===
Date	Event
1	The BBC confirms that a live episode of EastEnders will be aired to coincided with its 30th anniversary. Each episode during the week leading up to the anniversary will have a live element, with the live edition itself revealing the killer of Lucy Beale.
1	BBC Two airs the This World documentary, Rwanda's Untold Story, which questions official accounts of the 1994 Rwandan Genocide.
2	EastEnders Executive Producer Dominic Treadwell-Collins confirms that the BBC will stop airing omnibus editions of the soap from April 2015 because of declining viewing figures.
3	BBC One's Question Time apologises after the sister of murdered teenager Alice Gross complained about a discussion on the previous day's edition of the show that linked the case with the immigration debate.
3	It is reported that a Top Gear special in Argentina has been cut short after one of the cars used for the programme sparked protests because of an apparent reference to the Falklands War in its number plate. However, the BBC says that the Porsche, with the registration H982 FKL, had not been chosen deliberately. Top Gear Executive Producer Andy Wilman later says the choice of number plate was not a stunt.
6	Ofcom is critical of Colin Brazier's report from the crash site of Malaysia Airlines Flight 17 in which the reporter examined items of luggage, but does not reprimand Sky News or Brazier, because Brazier had immediately expressed regret over his actions and Sky updated their guidelines for journalists following the incident.
6	1950s Cambridge-set crime drama Grantchester makes its debut on ITV starring Robson Green as DI Geordie Keating.
7	The BBC has defended a controversial rape storyline in EastEnders after 278 complaints were made to Ofcom. The scenes, featuring the characters Dean Wicks (played by Matt Di Angelo) and Linda Carter (Kellie Bright) were aired in the previous day's episode of the soap, which some viewers felt was inappropriate before the 9 pm watershed. The BBC says the story was well signposted and that care was taken to handle it sensitively.
7	The BBC asks the public to submit entries for the UK's entry for the 2015 Eurovision Song Contest, the first time this has happened since 2008.
7	A version of The Beach Boys song "God Only Knows" is simulcast across BBC television and radio channels to launch BBC Music. It features Brian Wilson and other major artists from different musical genres (creating a supergroup called The Impossible Orchestra). The song will be released to raise money for Children in Need.
8	Viacom, the new owners of Channel 5, outline plans to overtake Channel 4 in the ratings as "the first step" in their plans to increase the channel's profile. Viva will also be pulled from Freeview to enable Spike to be launched in the UK.
8	The BBC says it will no longer show editions of Top of the Pops presented by Dave Lee Travis following his recent conviction for indecent assault.
8	Nancy Birtwhistle wins the fifth series of The Great British Bake Off.
9	Rona Fairhead is officially confirmed as the new Chair of the BBC Trust.
9	Thomas and Friends celebrates its 30th anniversary.
11	A suspected attempt is made to steal the statue of the late comedian, Eric Morecambe from its seafront position in the Lancashire town of Morecambe. A man is subsequently detained under the Mental Health Act after trying to saw off one of the statue's legs. Work is carried out to repair the statue, which is restored to its position in December.
13	The UK's main broadcasters announce plans for three televised debates before next year's general election, one of which will see UKIP leader Nigel Farage invited to take part. The debates will follow a 2–3–4 format, with the first being a joint Channel 4-Sky News debate featuring Prime Minister David Cameron and Leader of the Opposition Ed Miliband. A BBC debate will include Cameron, Miliband and Liberal Democrat leader Nick Clegg, and an ITV debate will feature Cameron, Miliband, Clegg and Farage. The broadcasters say the debates, planned for 2 April, 16 April and 30 April 2015, reflect "changes in the political landscape" since the debates ahead of the 2010 general election. However, other parties such as the Greens and the Scottish National Party have expressed anger that they will not be invited to take part, while Farage, whose party recently won its first seat in the House of Commons, is keen to be included in a second debate.
13	Judy Finnigan issues an apology after comments she made on the day's edition of Loose Women concerning footballer and convicted rapist Ched Evans sparked anger on social media.
15	The local television channel Made in Cardiff goes live at 8 pm.
15	Launch of the BBC Genome Project, an online resource allowing users to browse through back copies of the Radio Times from 1923 to 2009, including television and radio listings.
16	The Welsh language soap opera Pobol y Cwm celebrates its 40th anniversary.
16	ITV airs the 7000th episode of Emmerdale.
17	Martin Clunes and Neil Morrissey perform a sketch as Gary and Tony from the 1990s sitcom Men Behaving Badly for Channel 4's Stand Up to Cancer, the first time the characters have been seen on screen since 1998.
18	Top Gear presenter Jeremy Clarkson says that he will have penalty points on his driving licence for the first time in three decades after he was caught speeding between Whitby and London.
20	ITV announces that Sally Ann Matthews is returning to Coronation Street reprising her role as Jenny Bradley after more than two decades away.
21	Alicia Castro, the Argentinian ambassador to the UK, calls on the BBC to issue a public apology over the recent Top Gear row involving her country. Castro has also made an official complaint to the broadcaster alleging that presenter Jeremy Clarkson behaved provocatively and made offensive remarks about Argentina. The Argentinian embassy confirms that Castro met with BBC Director of Television Danny Cohen to discuss the matter on 20 October.
21	Appearing before the Culture, Media and Sport Select Committee, BBC Trust Chair Rona Fairhead gives her backing to the licence fee, saying it is the best way to fund the broadcaster.
21	BBC One airs the Panorama film To Walk Again, documenting a pioneering therapy that enabled a paralysed man to walk again by transplanting cells from his nasal cavity into his spinal cord.
22	ITV airs a special edition of Loose Women recorded before the death of actress and presenter Lynda Bellingham, who died from colorectal cancer on 19 October. In the edition, Bellingham talks about her wish to spend a final Christmas with her family.
23	ITV announces that Tina O'Brien is returning to Coronation Street after eight years away reprising her role of Sarah Platt.
23	In what is believed to be a first for British television, ITV announces that Phillip Schofield will make a 24-hour non-stop broadcast on the ITV network to raise funds for charity. He will begin the challenge on This Morning on 1 December and appear on other ITV shows throughout the next 24 hours, raising funds for the broadcaster's Text Santa appeal.
23	Two episodes of the 1960s ITV sketch series At Last the 1948 Show, which featured John Cleese and Graham Chapman, have been discovered in the private collection of the late Sir David Frost, the British Film Institute announces.
23	Appearing on BBC Radio 2's Steve Wright in the Afternoon, comedian Miranda Hart announces there will be no more episodes of her sitcom, Miranda after Christmas 2014. The series, which started in 2009, will end with two Christmas specials.
23	Publication of the Home Affairs Select Committee report into the police raid on a property belonging to Cliff Richard, which describes the process as "inept", and says that South Yorkshire Police should not have tried to agree a deal with a BBC reporter to provide coverage of the raid.
26	Channel 4 has commissioned a drama about the talks that led to the forming of the coalition government following the 2010 general election, starring Mark Gatiss as Peter Mandelson, Bertie Carvel as Nick Clegg, Mark Dexter as David Cameron and Ian Grieve as Gordon Brown. The 90-minute drama, written by Mark Graham, looks at the rise to prominence of Clegg during the coalition talks, with filming beginning in London within days.
29	Channel 4 announces plans for a mockumentary imagining what would happen if the UK Independence Party were to win the 2015 general election. Announced under the working title of 100 Days of UKIP, it aired in February 2015 as UKIP: The First 100 Days.
31	The Judicial Office confirms that Rolf Harris has lost the first round of an appeal against his conviction for indecent assault.
31	The BBC says it will not issue an apology over its Top Gear Argentina special, and will broadcast the programme.

=== November ===
Date	Event
1	The BBC announces plans to launch a public consultation on televised debates for the 2015 general election. The move is welcomed by the Scottish National Party, which had urged broadcasters to think again about the present arrangement which excludes them from taking part.
2	Fans of the ITV soap Crossroads celebrate the programme's 50th anniversary at a former filming location in Sutton Coldfield. The show was launched on 2 November 1964, and axed in 1988. It was briefly revived in 2001 before being axed again two years later.
3	More4 will screen The Vote, a play by James Graham set on election night 2015, on the night of the next general election, the channel announces.
5	Hugh Bonneville, who plays Robert Crawley in the ITV period drama Downton Abbey, dismisses rumours that the programme's dog Isis was killed off in a recent episode because of the similarity of her name to an acronym used for the extremist group Islamic State. Speculation began following the episode's transmission a few days earlier, but Bonneville describes anyone adhering to the theory as "a complete berk".
5	BBC Education Editor Penny Marshall announces she is returning to ITV News to resume her role as their Social Affairs Editor. Her announcement comes a day after she appeared before a House of Lords select committee on women and broadcasting.
6	ITV's This Morning airs a live vasectomy operation ahead of World Vasectomy Day on 7 November.
7	Former BBC journalist Olenka Frenkiel criticises the broadcaster for discriminating against female presenters.
7	Channel 5 airs the Episode 7000 of Neighbours.
8	James Jordan, a dancer on the BBC's Strictly Come Dancing, accuses the programme's producers of trying to turn the public against his wife, Ola, also a dancer on the programme, after an article appeared in the Daily Mail alleging that she was bullying her dance partner, Steve Backshall.
9	A video in which Doctor Who star Peter Capaldi appears in character as the Twelfth Doctor to deliver a personal message of comfort to a nine-year-old autistic boy whose grandmother had recently died has been viewed more than 500,000 times on YouTube, it is reported.
10	A change in advertising regulations comes into force that allows the use of electronic cigarettes to be shown on television for the first time. Although commercials for e-cigarettes have aired for some time, showing the act of using the cigarette, known as vaping, was not permitted.
10	ITV confirms that it has dropped the comedian Dapper Laughs from its schedules following controversial comments he made about rape and homeless people. His series, Dapper Laughs: On the Pull, will not be recommissioned for a second series following an online campaign for it to be discontinued.
11	Following requests from the public, My Christmas Advert, a 1984 Oxo commercial featuring Lynda Bellingham, will air on ITV on Christmas Day as a tribute to the actress, Oxo have confirmed.
11	Television sports presenter Charlie Webster resigns as a patron of Sheffield United after footballer and convicted rapist Ched Evans is allowed to begin training at the club following his recent release from jail.
13	The BBC2 "Window on the World" ident package is seen for the final time after about 8 years in use, although elements of it (programme slides) are retained.
15	The BBC celebrity gymnastics competition Tumble is axed after one series, due to poor ratings.
16	The BBC issues an apology after Strictly Come Dancing judge Len Goodman swore during the previous evening's live edition of the show.
16	Gareth Malone's All-Star Choir reach number one in the UK Singles Chart with their version of Avicii's "Wake Me Up", recorded for Children in Need 2014.
16	The Band Aid 30 version of "Do They Know It's Christmas?" is broadcast for the first time on ITV's The X Factor, a day after it was recorded to raise money for the victims of the Ebola virus epidemic in West Africa. The song tops the UK chart the following week (23 November) after selling 312,000 copies.
16	BBC One airs a repeat of an edition of Countryfile first shown in August which includes an interview with Northern Ireland blacksmith Barney Devlin, who inspired Seamus Heaney's poem, The Forge. The piece is shown with subtitles, prompting nationalist and unionist politicians to accuse the BBC of being "patronising".
17	Sky News presenter Jayne Secker cuts short an interview with Sir Bob Geldof after he uses the word "bollocks" twice while live on air.
17	Ofcom launches an investigation into EastEnders following its storyline involving the rape of Queen Vic landlady Linda Carter.
17	Singer Myleene Klass criticises Labour Party leader Ed Miliband for his plans to introduce a mansion tax for houses costing over £2m during an edition of ITV's The Agenda, claiming it will hit "little grannies" in modest London homes rather than the super-rich at whom it is aimed.
18	Ofcom launches an investigation into the way the Premier League sells the broadcast rights for live football matches following a complaint from Virgin Media.
18	The charity Prostate Cancer UK praises EastEnders for "[breaking] down one of the biggest taboos in men's health" with a storyline in which the character Stan Carter (played by Timothy West) is diagnosed with prostate cancer.
18	Ofcom rules that STV was in breach of broadcasting rules after airing a repeat edition of Scotland Tonight discussing the independence referendum on the day the vote was being held.
18	The Only Way Is Essex star Gemma Collins withdraws from the fourteenth series of I'm a Celebrity...Get Me Out of Here! after spending 72 hours in the jungle.
21	David Prowse, who played the Green Cross Code man in a 1970s road safety ad campaign, is to reprise the role for two short YouTube films aimed at teaching adults road safety.
21	Phoebe Riley wins the 2014 series of Junior MasterChef.
25	Top Gear's Argentina special will air at Christmas as part of two programmes recorded in South America, the BBC confirms.
25	Jazz Journal reports that the 2014 M&S Christmas ad campaign features a duet of Gregory Porter and Julie London singing London's 1963 recording of "Fly Me to the Moon". Decca Records have also released the song as a single to raise money for the Make-A-Wish Foundation UK.
27	Linda Henry, who plays Shirley Carter in EastEnders, will stand trial in February 2015 for racially aggravated harassment following an incident in September, it is reported.

=== December ===
Date	Event
1	The BBC Trust declines a request to take further action against Jeremy Clarkson for his apparent use of the N-word.
1	Stephen Fry will be part of the voice cast of the 2015 Danger Mouse revival, it is confirmed. He will play the role of Colonel K.
1–2	Phillip Schofield completes his 24-hour broadcasting marathon for ITV's Text Santa. The event, aired on ITV3, sees the presenter doing a number of things, including abseiling down a building and meeting Prime Minister David Cameron.
4	The programme content of the Welsh language channel S4C becomes available to view live and on demand through BBC iPlayer. S4C is the only independent channel available via the service, and programmes will be viewable for 30 days.
4	Conservative MP Alec Shelbrooke seeks a House of Commons debate on the topic of the number of repeats being shown on television over Christmas after the day's edition of the Daily Mirror reported that 63% of the programming shown on the UK's mainstream channels over Christmas 2014 will be repeats. Shelbrooke's request is turned down.
5	The BBC Trust announces plans for a full public consultation into its proposed transfer of BBC Three to online-only.
7	Jeremy Paxman is confirmed as the presenter of Churchill: The Nation's Farewell, an hour-long documentary to air in January 2015 to coincide with the 50th anniversary of the State funeral of Winston Churchill, held on 30 January 1965. BBC Parliament will air television coverage of the funeral in real time on 30 January.
7	World Superbike champion Carl Fogarty wins the fourteenth series of I'm a Celebrity...Get Me Out of Here!.
8	Barbara Windsor will reprise her role as EastEnders pub landlady Peggy Mitchell for a special episode of the soap to culminate with its 30th anniversary, it is reported.
9	The BBC One late evening regional news bulletins in England will be extended from 7 1/2 to 15 minutes in the run-up to next year's general election, the BBC confirms.
9	Figures released by Ofcom indicate that the number of households owning a TV set fell by 300,000 between the end of 2012 and 2013, the first decrease to be recorded. The figure dropped from 26.33 million to 26.02 million as more people used online resources to watch TV content.
10	Further details of plans to move BBC Three online are unveiled, where the channel will broadcast 24 hours a day and have an emphasis on comedy and long form content. Subject to the approval of the BBC Trust, a BBC One + 1 service will occupy the channel space vacated by BBC Three, while CBBC's daily airtime will be extended by two hours.
11	The BBC announce plans for a series based on author J. K. Rowling's Cormoran Strike crime series, which she writes under the pseudonym Robert Galbraith.
11	Chris Evans and Fearne Cotton present the first BBC Music Awards live from the Earls Court Exhibition Centre in London. Among the winners are Ed Sheeran for British Artist of the Year, and Pharrell Williams, who picks up the awards for Best International Artist of the Year, and Single of the Year for "Happy". Overnight figures suggest the Awards, aired simultaneously by BBC One, BBC Radio 1 and BBC Radio 2, were watched by an average audience of 3.9 million, peaking at 4.7 million.
11	Comedian Russell Brand and UKIP leader Nigel Farage are involved in a heated exchange on BBC One's Question Time during which Brand criticises Farage for being a "pound shop Enoch Powell", a reference to the politician who made the infamous Rivers of Blood speech in 1968.
14	2014 Formula One winner Lewis Hamilton is named this year's BBC Sports Personality of the Year.
14	Ben Haenow wins the eleventh series of The X Factor.
15	BBC reporter Alan Little announces he will leave the broadcaster at the end of 2014, after working for them for three decades.
15	BBC Three's Don't Tell the Bride is to move to BBC One, it is announced. The programme had faced the axe if BBC Three is given the go ahead to move its content online.
16	Fox Broadcasting announces that Gracepoint, the US version of ITV's Broadchurch, will not return for a second series because of poor ratings.
16	The possible finalists of the tenth series of The Apprentice may have been revealed ahead of the following day's semi-final after an error on the programme's website saw two of the remaining five candidates deleted. They were later restored.
18	Channel 4 confirm that the Michael family have left the TV series Gogglebox because father, Andrew, has been selected as a candidate for the UK Independence Party at the next general election; seeking elected office is against the show's rules.
18	Nick Hewer announces he will leave The Apprentice at the end of the current series.
20	Caroline Flack and dance partner Pasha Kovalev win the twelfth series of Strictly Come Dancing.
21	Australian businessman Mark Wright wins the tenth series of The Apprentice.
22	Data released by Ofcom indicated that Big Brother was the most complained about television programme of 2014, with 3,784 complaints. Most of these concerned the behaviour of the show's 2014 winner, Helen Wood.
23	William Pooley, a British nurse who survived Ebola, is to present Channel 4's Alternative Christmas message.
23	Jamie Scott wins the seventh series of MasterChef: The Professionals.
24	The Advertising Standards Agency has banned three commercials for e-cigarettes. Two ads for VIP Electronic Cigarettes were banned because they were deemed to be glamourising the product, while it was felt that a commercial for KIK e-cigarettes was encouraging their use by ex-smokers.
24	James Bond film Skyfall makes its British television debut on ITV at 8 pm. Overnight viewing figures later reveal the film was watched by 6.33 million viewers, the highest audience of the day excluding soaps.
25	The Christmas Day episode of Doctor Who reveals that Jenna Coleman will return in the next series as The Doctor's assistant, Clara Oswald. Doctor Who producer Steven Moffat later tells Doctor Who Magazine that Coleman had planned to leave the series before or during the 2014 Christmas special, but later changed her mind because she felt Clara's story was not finished.
26	Overnight viewing figures for Christmas Day indicate that the Royal Christmas Message was the most watched programme of the day. The broadcast, aired simultaneously by BBC One and ITV, received an audience of 7.82 million. BBC One's Mrs. Brown's Boys had 7.61 million viewers, and was the single most watched show of the day. BBC One also had seven of the top ten Christmas Day programmes.
27	Part One of the Top Gear Patagonia Special is aired on BBC Two and seen by an average audience of 4.7 million viewers. The second part, which features the controversial Argentina leg of the programme's visit to South America, airs the following day and is watched by an average of 4.8 million viewers.
29	BBC One's crime drama Happy Valley is voted as the best drama of 2014 by a group of Radio Times critics.
29	Jamie Oliver reveals that he was offered a role as a Hobbit in one of Peter Jackson's films as a thank you for providing the catering for the director's 50th birthday, but turned it down because of work commitments.
30	Singer Sam Smith, who performed live on the 2014 final of The X Factor, criticises the series for being damaging to songwriters because contestants are required to perform cover versions of popular songs.
31	It is reported that Police Scotland are investigating several complaints concerning tweets made by TV personality Katie Hopkins about an Ebola patient.
31	As part of its New Year's Eve celebration, BBC One airs Queen & Adam Lambert Rock Big Ben Live, a concert at Westminster's Central Hall featuring the surviving members of Queen and American vocalist Adam Lambert, the runner up on the 2009 season of American Idol.

== Most watched television of this year ==
=== Top 20 Most Watched Broadcasts ===
Rank	Show	Number of Viewers in millions	Date	Network	Brief Description
1	World Cup 2014: GER v ARG	14.92	13 July	BBC One	Germany beat Argentina 1 – 0 in the final of the World Cup, making it their fourth victory.
2	World Cup 2014: ENG v ITA	14.70	14 June	BBC One	England played their first game of the 2014 FIFA World Cup, losing 2 – 1 to Italy.
3	FIFA World Cup 2014: Uruguay v England	13.87	19 June	ITV	England lose to Uruguay 2 – 1, making it impossible to progress to the knockout stages of the 2014 FIFA World Cup.
4	The Great British Bake Off	13.51	8 October	BBC One	Nancy Birtwhistle is crowned the winner of the fifth series of The Great British Bake Off.
5	World Cup 2014: BRA v GER	13.46	8 July	BBC One	Brazil lose to Germany national football team 7 – 1, which is the biggest winning margin in a World Cup semi-final or final.
6	Sherlock	12.72	1 January	BBC One	The first episode of the third series of Sherlock, where it's revealed how Sherlock Holmes survived a fall from St Bartholomew's Hospital.
7	New Year's Fireworks	12.50	31 December	BBC One	The airing of the annual fireworks around the London Eye.
8	Britain's Got Talent	11.84	12 April	ITV	The premiere of the eighth series of the hit show, where the new "golden-buzzer" are introduced into the auditions.
9	Strictly Come Dancing	11.67	20 December	BBC One	The dance performances for the final of Strictly Come Dancing. Caroline Flack & Pasha Kovalev achieve two perfect scores of 40.
10	I'm a Celebrity...Get Me Out of Here!	11.62	16 November	ITV	The premiere of the fourteenth series of the hit show, where it's revealed which celebrities will be going into the jungle, including Tinchy Stryder, Melanie Sykes, Craig Charles and Carl Fogarty.
10	Strictly Come Dancing: The Results	11.62	20 December	BBC One	Caroline Flack and her dance partner Pasha Kovalev are crowned champions, with Frankie Bridge and Simon Webbe being runners-up.
12	Britain's Got Talent	11.53	7 June	ITV	Collabro are crowned champions of the eighth series, with Lucy Kay being runner-up. Cheryl premiered her new single "Crazy Stupid Love", performing alongside Tinie Tempah.
13	Strictly Come Dancing: The Results	11.46	15 November	BBC One	The show's annual broadcast, live from the Blackpool Tower.
14	Sherlock	11.38	5 January	BBC One	Doctor Watson marries Mary Morstan.
14	Sherlock	11.38	12 January	BBC One	The finale to the third series.
16	Call the Midwife	11.35	19 January	BBC One	The premiere of the third series, and the midwives move into a new house, and Princess Margaret, Countess of Snowdon makes a visit.
17	I'm a Celebrity...Get Me Out of Here!	11.15	7 December	ITV	Carl Fogarty is crowned King of the Jungle.
18	Strictly Come Dancing	10.98	13 December	BBC One	The semi-final, where Caroline Flack achieves the first perfect score of the series. It was also the first show following the shock exit of favourite Pixie Lott.
19	Strictly Come Dancing	10.97	6 December	BBC One	The quarter-final which featured a waltz-athon.
20	Strictly Come Dancing	10.93	1 November	BBC One	The annual Halloween special, which featured the first ten given out by one of the regular judges, Bruno Tonioli, for Frankie Bridge's Tango.

== Debuts ==
=== BBC ===
Date	Debut	Channel
2 January	Dolphins – Spy in the Pod	BBC One
4 January	Catherine Tate's Nan	BBC One
5 January	Operation Grand Canyon with Dan Snow	BBC Two
6 January	The 7.39	BBC One
9 January	Tough Young Teachers	BBC Three
11 January	Reflex	BBC One
14 January	House of Fools	BBC Two
16 January	Hidden Kingdoms	BBC One
17 January	The Dog Ate My Homework	CBBC
20 January	The Great Interior Design Challenge	BBC Two
27 January	Britain's Great War	BBC One
28 January	Hank Zipzer	CBBC
29 January	The Restaurant Man	BBC Two
5 February	Inside No. 9	BBC Two
6 February	Pound Shop Wars	BBC One
7 February	Alan Davies Après-Ski	BBC Two
8 February	Salamander	BBC Four
10 February	The Life of Rock with Brian Pern	BBC Four
13 February	The Brits Who Built the Modern World	BBC Four
24 February	Revenge of the Egghead	BBC Two
25 February	Hair	BBC Three
27 February	Jumbo: The Plane that Changed the World	BBC Two
3 March	Sport Relief's Top Dog	BBC Two
3 March	Mary Berry Cooks	BBC Two
3 March	Mind the Gap: London vs the Rest	BBC Two
6 March	37 Days	BBC Two
10 March	The Michael McIntyre Chat Show	BBC One
10 March	Watchdog Test House	BBC One
12 March	Famous, Rich and Hungry	BBC One
12 March	Collectaholics	BBC Two
13 March	The Walshes	BBC Four
17 March	Life and Death Row	BBC Three
19 March	W1A	BBC Two
20 March	Turks & Caicos	BBC Two
24 March	The Voice: Louder on Two	BBC Two
27 March	Salting the Battlefield	BBC Two
1 April	Killer Magic	BBC Three
2 April	The European Union: In or Out	BBC Two
2 April	Invasion of the Job Snatchers	BBC Three
2 April	Monkey Planet	BBC One
6 April	The Crimson Field	BBC One
12 April	The Guess List	BBC One
15 April	Watermen: a Dirty Business	BBC Two
15 April	The Big Allotment Challenge	BBC Two
17 April	Parking Mad	BBC One
21 April	Jamaica Inn	BBC One
29 April	Happy Valley	BBC One
30 April	A Poet in New York	BBC Two
5 May	The Link	BBC One
15 May	Tyger Takes On...	BBC Three
17 May	WHOOPS I MISSED THE BUS	CBBC
22 May	From There to Here	BBC One
25 May	Quirke	BBC One
2 June	A Very British Airline	BBC Two
2 June	World War I at Home	BBC One & BBC Four
3 June	Tigers About the House	BBC Two
21 June	A Question of Sport: Super Saturday	BBC One
3 July	The Honourable Woman	BBC Two
6 July	Common	BBC One
21 July	Pop Slam!	CBBC
4 August	Kate & Mim-Mim	CBeebies
5 August	Harriet's Army	CBBC
5 August	In the Club	BBC One
7 August	Our World War	BBC Three
8 August	Sweets Made Simple	BBC Two
8 August	The Great British Bake Off: An Extra Slice	BBC Two
9 August	Tumble	BBC One
15 August	Boomers	BBC One
18 August	Two Tribes	BBC Two
19 August	Young Vets	BBC Two
30 August	Crimes of Passion	BBC Four
1 September	The Housing Enforcers	BBC One
1 September	A Taste of Britain	BBC One
3 September	Our School	CBBC
3 September	Our Zoo	BBC One
4 September	Castles in the Sky	BBC Two
7 September	The Secrets	BBC One
9 September	The Motorway: Life in the Fast Lane	BBC Two
12 September	Lorraine Pascale: How to Be a Better Cook	BBC Two
23 September	The Driver	BBC One
25 September	Your Home in Their Hands	BBC One
26 September	The Furchester Hotel	CBeebies
29 September	Home Away from Home	BBC One
1 October	Millie Inbetween	CBBC
2 October	Detectorists	BBC Four
5 October	Wonders of the Monsoon	BBC Two
6 October	The Kitchen	BBC Two
20 October	Holiday of My Lifetime	BBC One
20 October	Big Dreams Small Spaces	BBC Two
23 October	Life Story	BBC One
28 October	The Missing	BBC One
3 November	The Passing Bells	BBC One
9 November	The Mekong River with Sue Perkins	BBC Two
10 November	Glorious Garden's From Above	BBC One
13 November	Puppy Love	BBC Four
18 November	Secrets of the Castle	BBC Two
23 November	Remember Me	BBC One
24 November	Don't Mess with Me	BBC One
24 November	Channel Patrol	BBC One
8 December	Oxford Street Revealed	BBC One
15 December	Operation Meet the Street	BBC One
17 December	Hey Duggee	CBeebies
24 December	The Incredible Adventures of Professor Branestawm	BBC One
26 December	The Boy in the Dress	BBC One
27 December	Win Your Wish List	BBC One
29 December	Mapp & Lucia	BBC One

=== ITV ===
Date	Debut	Channel
6 January	A Great Welsh Adventure with Griff Rhys Jones	ITV
14 January	Paul O'Grady's Animal Orphans	ITV
18 January	Scrambled!	ITV & CITV
4 February	Births, Deaths and Marriages	ITV
14 February	Student Nurses: Bedpans and Bandages	ITV
21 February	Edge of Heaven	ITV
26 February	Party Wright Around the World	ITV2
3 March	I Never Knew That About Britain	ITV
16 March	Educating Joey Essex	ITV2
16 March	Harry's South Pole Heroes	ITV
17 March	Auf Wiedersehen My Pet	ITV
17 March	The Widower	ITV
20 March	Ade at Sea	ITV
20 March	Dangerous Dogs	ITV
7 April	Undeniable	ITV
10 April	Tom Daley Goes Global	ITV2
11 April	Weekend Escapes with Warwick Davis	ITV
12 April	Amazing Greys	ITV
21 April	Tommy Cooper: Not Like That, Like This	ITV
22 April	Warren United	ITV4
24 April	Wanted: A Family of My Own	ITV
26 April	Weekend	ITV
26 April	Let Me Entertain You	ITV
27 April	Viral Tap	ITV2
28 April	Jo Frost: Family Matters	ITV
28 April	Good Morning Britain	ITV
28 April	Ejector Seat	ITV
28 April	Prey	ITV
7 May	Billy Connolly's Big Send Off	ITV
5 June	TV OD	ITV2
11 July	The Cruise Ship	ITV
14 July	The Speakmans	ITV
4 August	The 21st Question	ITV
6 August	Secrets from the Clinc	ITV
7 August	Kids with Cameras: Diary of a Children's Ward	ITV
10 August	Come on Down! The Game Show Story	ITV
10 August	The Great War: The People's Story	ITV
11 August	Judge Rinder	ITV
18 August	Gift Wrapped	ITV
20 August	Secrets from the Asylum	ITV
1 September	Who's Doing the Dishes?	ITV
4 September	Chasing Shadows	ITV
9 September	Wilderness Walks with Ray Mears	ITV
11 September	Bad Bridesmaid	ITV2
15 September	The Undriveables	ITV
15 September	Cilla	ITV
29 September	Dapper Laughs: On the Pull	ITV2
6 October	Grantchester	ITV
8 October	Ladies of London	ITVBe
13 October	Seven Days With...	ITVBe
16 October	The Great Fire	ITV
17 October	Secrets from the Sky	ITV
26 October	Keep It in the Family	ITV
5 November	Broadmoor	ITV
10 December	The Lost Honour of Christopher Jefferies	ITV
23 December	Below Deck	ITVBe
23 December	Collage and Service: Meets G & G1	ITV

=== Channel 4 ===
Date	Debut	Channel
6 January	Benefits Street	Channel 4
7 January	The Taste	Channel 4
10 January	Jamie & Jimmy's Friday Night Feast	Channel 4
26 January	The Jump	Channel 4
6 February	Big Ballet	Channel 4
9 February	Babylon	Channel 4
17 February	Superstar Dogs: Countdown to Crufts	Channel 4
25 February	Kirstie's Best of Both Worlds	Channel 4
1 April	New Worlds	Channel 4
20 April	For the Love of Cars	Channel 4
26 April	Weekend Kitchen with Waitrose	Channel 4
5 May	Draw It!	Channel 4
5 May	The Island with Bear Grylls	Channel 4
21 July	Virtually Famous	E4
1 August	The Singer Takes It All	Channel 4
4 August	Win It, Cook It	Channel 4
4 August	Cooks' Questions	More4
1 September	Jamie's Comfort Food	Channel 4
4 September	Educating the East End	Channel 4
15 September	Glue	E4
29 September	24 Hours in Police Custody	Channel 4
2 October	Lovesick (Scrotal Recall)	Channel 4
3 October	Stars at Your Service	Channel 4
13 October	Daily Brunch	Channel 4
3 November	Small Animal Hospital	Channel 4
11 November	Bad Robots	E4

=== Channel 5 ===
Date	Debut	Channel
12 February	Suspects	Channel 5
17 April	Beware! Cowboy Builders: Abroad	Channel 5
29 April	GPs: Behind Closed Doors	Channel 5
5 May	Lily's Driftwood Bay	Channel 5
12 June	Pip Ahoy!	Channel 5
11 July	On the Yorkshire Buses	Channel 5
24 October	Rome: The World's First Superpower	Channel 5

=== Other channels ===
Date	Debut	Channel
7 February	Duck Quacks Don't Echo	Sky 1
6 March	Brian Conley's Timeline	Challenge
22 April	Ex on the Beach	MTV
23 April	Marooned with Ed Stafford	Discovery Channel
24 April	Trying Again	Sky Living
9 May	The Football's On	BT Sport
23 May	Mr. Sloane	Sky Atlantic
16 June	Alan Davies: As Yet Untitled	Dave
21 August	Most Haunted	Really
6 October	Wallykazam!	Nick Jr.
10 October	The Evermoor Chronicles	Disney Channel

== World Cup ==
The winner of the 2014 World Cup was Germany.

== Channels ==
=== New channels ===
Date	Channel
4 February	Channel 5 +24
24 March	Mustard TV
31 March	London Live
1 April	Cartoon Network +1
9 June	ITV Encore
10 June	Forces TV
14 July	Pop +1
4 August	TruTV
12 August	Sky Sports 5
8 October	ITVBe

=== Defunct channels ===
Date	Channel
3 February	5* +1
1 April	Cartoon Network Too
17 April	Shop at Bid
17 April	Price Drop
14 July	Kix +

=== Rebranding channels ===
Date	Old Name	New Name
10 March	Bid	Shop at Bid
12 August	Sky Sports News	Sky Sports News HQ

== Television shows ==
=== Changes of network affiliation ===
Show	Moved from	Moved to
Birds of a Feather	BBC One	ITV
The Kumars	BBC One	Sky1
The Sky at Night	BBC One	BBC Four
Only Connect	BBC Four	BBC Two
Russell Howard's Good News	BBC Three	BBC Two
The Great British Bake Off	BBC Two	BBC One
Robot Wars (repeats)	Dave	Challenge
The Hoobs	Channel 4	YouTube
The Only Way is Essex	ITV2	ITVBe
Dinner Date	ITV	ITVBe
The Job Lot	ITV	ITV2
Royal Ascot	BBC One & BBC Two	Channel 4
Helix	Channel 5	5*
Two and a Half Men	Comedy Central	ITV2
Most Haunted	Sky Living	Really

=== Returning this year after a break of one year or longer ===
Programme	Date(s) of original removal	Original channel(s)	Date of return	New channel(s)
Birds of a Feather	24 December 1998	BBC One	2 January 2014	ITV
The Kumars	18 August 2006	BBC Two & BBC One	15 January 2014	Sky1
Coach Trip	9 March 2012	Channel 4	27 January 2014	N/A (Same channel as original)
Police 5	18 December 1992	ITV	11 February 2014	Channel 5
Only Fools and Horses	29 December 1996; 25 December 2003	BBC One	21 March 2014 (part of Sport Relief)	N/A (Same channel as original)
Good Morning Britain	31 December 1992	ITV	28 April 2014	N/A (Same channel as original)
Comedy Playhouse	9 July 1975	BBC One	29 April 2014	N/A (Same channel as original)
Most Haunted	21 July 2010	Sky Living	21 August 2014	Really
Celebrity Squares	7 July 1979; 3 January 1997	ITV	10 September 2014	N/A (Same channel as original)
Sunday Night at the Palladium	1955; 1974	ITV	14 September 2014	N/A (Same channel as original)

== Continuing television shows ==
=== 1920s ===
Programme	Date
BBC Wimbledon	(1927–1939, 1946–2019, 2021–present)

=== 1930s ===
Programme	Date
Trooping the Colour	1937–1939, 1946–2019, 2023–present
The Boat Race	(1938–1939, 1946–2019, 2021–present)

=== 1950s ===
Programme	Date
Panorama	(1953–present)
The Sky at Night	(1957–present)
Final Score	(1958–present)
Blue Peter	(1958–present)

=== 1960s ===
Programme	Date
Coronation Street	(1960–present)
Points of View	(1961–present)
Songs of Praise	(1961–present)
South Today	(1961–present)
University Challenge	(1962–1987, 1994–present)
Doctor Who	(1963–1989, 1996, 2005–present)
Match of the Day	(1964–present)
Top of the Pops	(1964–present)
Gardeners' World	(1968–present)
A Question of Sport	(1968, 1970–present)

=== 1970s ===
Programme	Date
Emmerdale	(1972–present)
Mastermind	(1972–present)
Newsround	(1972–present)
Arena	(1975–present)
One Man and His Dog	(1976–present)
Top Gear	(1977–2001, 2002–present)
Ski Sunday	(1978–present)
Antiques Roadshow	(1979–present)
Question Time	(1979–present)

=== 1980s ===
Programme	Date
Children in Need	(1980–present)
Only Fools and Horses	(1981–1996, 2001–2003, 2014)
Countdown	(1982–present)
ITV Breakfast	(1983–present)
Channel 4 Racing	(1984–2016)
Thomas & Friends	(1984–present)
EastEnders	(1985–present)
Comic Relief	(1985–present)
Casualty	(1986–present)
Fifteen to One	(1988–2003, 2013–present)
This Morning	(1988–present)
Countryfile	(1988–present)

=== 1990s ===
Programme	Date
Have I Got News for You	(1990–present)
MasterChef	(1990–2001, 2005–present)
ITV News Meridian	(1993–present)
Junior MasterChef	(1994–1999, 2010–present)
Room 101	(1994–2007, 2012–present)
The National Lottery Draws	(1994–2017)
Top of the Pops 2	(1994–present)
Hollyoaks	(1995–present)
Soccer AM	(1995–present)
Never Mind the Buzzcocks	(1996–2015)
Silent Witness	(1996–present)
Midsomer Murders	(1997–present)
Y Clwb Rygbi, Wales	(1997–present)
Who Wants to Be a Millionaire?	(1998–2014)
British Soap Awards	(1999–2019, 2022–present)
Holby City	(1999–2022)

=== 2000s ===
Programme	Date
2000
Big Brother	(2000–2010, 2011–present)
Bargain Hunt	(2000–present)
BBC Breakfast	(2000–present)
Click	(2000–present)
Doctors	(2000–present)
A Place in the Sun	(2000–present)
Unreported World	(2000–present)
2001
Celebrity Big Brother	(2001–2010, 2011–2018)
BBC South East Today	(2001–present)
Football Focus	(2001–present)
Rogue Traders	(2001–present)
2002
Escape to the Country	(2002–present)
Fifth Gear	(2002–2016)
Flog It!	(2002–2020)
Foyle's War	(2002–2015)
I'm a Celebrity...Get Me Out of Here!	(2002–present)
In It to Win It	(2002–2016)
Inside Out	(2002–present)
Most Haunted	(2002–2010, 2014–present)
River City	(2002–2026)
Saturday Kitchen	(2002–present)
2003
Daily Politics	(2003–2018)
QI	(2003–present)
Peep Show	(2003–2015)
This Week	(2003–2019)
Celebrity Mastermind	(2003–present)
New Tricks	(2003–2015)
Eggheads	(2003–present)
Extraordinary People	(2003–present)
Grumpy Old Men	(2003–present)
Homes Under the Hammer	(2003–present)
Traffic Cops	(2003–present)
2004
Doc Martin	(2004–2022)
Match of the Day 2	(2004–present)
Strictly Come Dancing	(2004–present)
The X Factor	(2004–2018)
The Big Fat Quiz of the Year	(2004–present)
The Culture Show	(2004–present)
Football First	(2004–present)
The Gadget Show	(2004–present)
Live at the Apollo	(2004–present)
NewsWatch	(2004–present)
SadlerVision	(2004–present)
Strictly Come Dancing: It Takes Two	(2004–present)
Who Do You Think You Are?	(2004–present)
2005
8 Out of 10 Cats	(2005–present)
Coach Trip	(2005–2006, 2009–2012, 2013–present)
Deal or No Deal	(2005–2016)
The Andrew Marr Show	(2005–present)
The Adventure Show	(2005–present)
The Apprentice	(2005–present)
Dragons' Den	(2005–present)
The F Word	(2005–present)
The Hotel Inspector	(2005–present)
The Jeremy Kyle Show	(2005–present)
Mock the Week	(2005–present)
Springwatch	(2005–present)
2006
Dancing on Ice	(2006–2014)
Waterloo Road	(2006–2015, 2023–present)
The Album Chart Show	(2006–present)
Animal Spies!	(2006–present)
Lewis	(2006–2015)
The Apprentice: You're Fired!	(2006–present)
Banged Up Abroad	(2006–present)
Cricket AM	(2006–present)
Dickinson's Real Deal	(2006–present)
Don't Get Done, Get Dom	(2006–present)
Monkey Life	(2006–present)
Not Going Out	(2006–present)
The One Show	(2006–present)
People & Power	(2006–present)
Peschardt's People	(2006–present)
The Secret Millionaire	(2006–2008, 2010–present)
The Slammer	(2006–2015)
2007
Britain's Got Talent	(2007–present)
Outnumbered	(2007–2014)
Would I Lie to You?	(2007–present)
The Alan Titchmarsh Show	(2007–2014)
Benidorm	(2007–present)
The Big Questions	(2007–present)
Don't Tell the Bride	(2007–present)
The Graham Norton Show	(2007–present)
Harry & Paul	(2007–present)
Heir Hunters	(2007–present)
Helicopter Heroes	(2007–present)
Inspector George Gently	(2007–2017)
Jeff Randall Live	(2007–2014)
London Ink	(2007–present)
Real Rescues	(2007–present)
The Hot Desk	(2007–present)
2008
An Là	(2008–present)
Celebrity Juice	(2008–present)
Country House Rescue	(2008–present)
Only Connect	(2008–present)
Police Interceptors	(2008–present)
Put Your Money Where Your Mouth Is	(2008–present)
Rubbernecker	(2008–present)
Seachd Là	(2008–present)
Supersize vs Superskinny	(2008–2014)
Wallander	(2008–2016)
2009
Miranda	(2009–2015)
Pointless	(2009–present)
Rip Off Britain	(2009–present)
Russell Howard's Good News	(2009–2015)
The Chase	(2009–present)
The Cube	(2009–2015)
Alan Carr: Chatty Man	(2009–2016)
Bang Goes the Theory	(2009–2014)
Countrywise	(2009–present)
Cowboy Trap	(2009–present)
The Football League Show	(2009–2015)
Piers Morgan's Life Stories	(2009–present)
Rip Off Britain	(2009–present)

=== 2010s ===
Programme	Date
2010
Daybreak	(2010–2014)
DCI Banks	(2010–2016)
Downton Abbey	(2010–2015)
Eddie Stobart: Trucks & Trailers	(2010–2014)
The Great British Bake Off	(2010–present)
Great British Railway Journeys	(2010–present)
A League of Their Own	(2010–present)
Little Crackers	(2010–present)
Lorraine	(2010–present)
Luther	(2010–present)
The Million Pound Drop	(2010–2015)
The Nightshift	(2010–present)
The Only Way Is Essex	(2010–present)
Sherlock	(2010–present)
Strike-back	(2010–2014)
Sunday Morning Live	(2010–present)
Take Me Out	(2010–2020)
2011
All Over the Place	(2011–present)
Black Mirror	(2011–present)
Episodes	(2011–2017)
Four Rooms	(2011–present)
Fresh Meat	(2011–2016)
Friday Download	(2011–present)
Hacker Time	(2011–2016)
Horrible Histories: Gory Games	(2011–2018)
Junior Bake Off	(2011–present)
Made in Chelsea	(2011–present)
Match of the Day Kickabout	(2011–present)
Perfection	(2011–2015)
Ross Kemp: Extreme World	(2011–2017)
Scott & Bailey	(2011–2016)
The Sparticle Mystery	(2011–2015)
Sun, Sex and Suspicious Parents	(2011–present)
Text Santa	(2011–2015)
The Jonathan Ross Show	(2011–present)
Vera	2011–2025
2012
Derek	(2012–2014)
Endeavour	(2012–present)
Call the Midwife	(2012–present)
The Midnight Beast	(2012–2014)
Prisoners' Wives	(2012–present)
Pramface	(2012–2014)
Rocket's Island	(2012–2015)
The Syndicate	(2012–present)
Stella	(2012–present)
The Voice UK	(2012–present)
Tipping Point	(2012–present)
Paul O'Grady: For the Love of Dogs	(2012–2023)
Bad Education	(2012–2014)
The Bletchley Circle	(2012–2014)
Last Tango in Halifax	(2012–present)
Claimed and Shamed	(2012–present)
2013
Fake Reaction	(2013–2014)
The Dumping Ground	(2013–present)
Splash!	(2013–2014)
Mr Selfridge	(2013–2016)
Blandings	(2013–present)
Dani's Castle	(2013–2015)
Absolute Genius with Dick and Dom	(2013–present)
Badults	(2013–2014)
Broadchurch	(2013–2017)
Bluestone 42	(2013–2015)
In the Flesh	(2013–2014)
The Village	(2013–2014)
The Great British Sewing Bee	(2013–2016)
The Mill	(2013–2014)
Count Arthur Strong	(2013–2017)
The Fall	(2013–2016)
Big School	(2013–2014)
Big Star's Little Star	(2013–2018)
Tipping Point: Lucky Stars	(2013–2014, 2016–2017)
The Dog Rescuers	(2013–present)
Pressure Pad	(2013–2014)
Great British Garden Revival	(2013–2014)
Utopia	(2013–2014)
Atlantis	(2013–2015)
Yonderland	(2013–2016)

== Ending this year ==
Date(s)	Programme	Channel(s)	Debut(s)
5 January	That Puppet Game Show	BBC One	2013
13 January	Sacred Wonders of Britain	BBC Two	2013
16 January	Wild Brazil	BBC Two	2014
27 January	The Bletchley Circle	ITV	2012
30 January	Hidden Kingdoms	BBC One	2014
2 February	The Route Masters: Running London's Roads	BBC Two	2013
4 February	Who Wants to Be a Millionaire?	ITV	1998
14 February	Britain's Best Bakery	ITV	2012
15 February	Splash!	ITV	2013
17 February	Britain's Great War	BBC One	2014
20 February	Big Ballet	Channel 4	2014
21 February	Alan Davies Après-Ski	BBC Two	2014
27 February	The Brits Who Built the Modern World	BBC Four	2014
27 February	The Midnight Beast	E4	2012
5 March	Outnumbered	BBC One	2007
6 March	Fake Reaction	ITV2	2013
6 March	Supersize vs Superskinny	Channel 4	2008
8 March	37 Days	BBC Two	2014
9 March	Dancing on Ice	ITV	2006
25 March	Pramface	BBC Three	2012
27 March	Jeff Randall Live	Sky News	2007
28 March	Edge of Heaven	ITV	2014
29 March	Reflex	BBC One	2014
31 March	The Widower	ITV	2014
4 April	The Voice: Louder on Two	BBC Two	2014
14 April	Undeniable	ITV	2014
16 April	Monkey Planet	BBC One	2014
17 April	The Hoarder Next Door	Channel 4	2012
21 April	I Never Knew That About Britain	ITV	2014
22 April	New Worlds	Channel 4	2014
23 April	Jamaica Inn	BBC One	2014
24 April	Ade at Sea	ITV	2014
25 April	Daybreak	ITV	2010
5 May	Bang Goes the Theory	BBC One	2009
11 May	The Crimson Field	BBC One	2014
17 May	Amazing Greys	ITV	2014
24 May	The Guess List	BBC One	2014
5 June	Trying Again	Sky Living	2014
5 June	Food Inspectors	BBC One	2012
7 June	Let Me Entertain You	ITV	2014
8 June	Quirke	BBC One	2014
8 June	In the Flesh	BBC Three	2013
9 June	Classic Car Rescue	Channel 5	2012
13 June	Eddie Stobart: Trucks & Trailers	Channel 5	2010
16 June	A Very British Airline	BBC Two	2014
22 June	Ejector Seat	ITV	2014
27 June	Mr. Sloane	Sky Atlantic	2014
4 July	Draw It!	Channel 4	2014
7 July	Badults	BBC Three	2013
19 July	A Question of Sport: Super Saturday	BBC One	2014
24 July	TV OD	ITV2	2014
12 August	Utopia	Channel 4	2013
15 August	The 21st Question	ITV	2014
21 August	The Honourable Woman	BBC Two	2014
21 August	Our World War	BBC Three	2014
22 August	The Singer Takes It All	Channel 4	2014
23 August	Tipping Point: Lucky Stars	ITV	2013
24 August	The Mill	Channel 4	2013
29 August	Gift Wrapped	ITV	2014
12 September	The Secrets	BBC One	2014
13 September	Tumble	BBC One	2014
14 September	The Village	BBC One	2013
19 September	Win It, Cook It	Channel 4	2014
29 September	Cilla	ITV	2014
3 October	Pressure Pad	BBC One	2013
7 October	The Driver	BBC One	2014
8 October	Our Zoo	BBC One	2014
10 October	Big School	BBC One	2013
21 October	Bad Education	BBC Three	2012
2 November	Wonders of the Monsoon	BBC Two	2014
3 November	Glue	E4	2014
3 November	Dapper Laughs: On the Pull	ITV	2014
6 November	The Great Fire	ITV	2014
7 November	The Passing Bells	BBC One	2014
14 November	The Alan Titchmarsh Show	ITV	2007
27 November	Life Story	BBC One	2014
30 November	The Mekong River with Sue Perkins	BBC Two	2014
5 December	Daily Brunch	Channel 4	2014
7 December	Remember Me	BBC One	2014
13 December	The Munch Box	CITV	2013
17 December	Secrets of the Castle	BBC Two	2014
18 December	Puppy Love	BBC Four	2014
18 December	Babylon	Channel 4	2014
22 December	Derek	Channel 4	2012
28 December	Got to Dance	Sky 1	2009
31 December	Mapp & Lucia	BBC One	2014

== Deaths ==
Date	Name	Age	Broadcast credibility
12 January	Alexandra Bastedo	67	Actress (The Champions)
15 January	Roger Lloyd-Pack	69	Actor (Only Fools and Horses, The Vicar of Dibley, The Old Guys, Harry Potter and the Goblet of Fire)
18 January	Komla Dumor	41	Journalist and presenter (BBC World News)
19 January	Christopher Chataway	82	Broadcaster
5 February	Samantha Juste	69	Model, television personality and fashion designer (Top of the Pops)
13 February	Ken Jones	83	Actor (Porridge, The Liver Birds)
15 February	Christopher Malcolm	67	Actor (Only Fools & Horses, The Comic Strip Presents, The Rocky Horror Picture Show)
18 February	Malcolm Tierney	75	Actor (Brookside, Lovejoy, A Bit of a Do, Braveheart, The Saint)
8 March	Jimmy Ellis	82	actor (Z-Cars)
15 March	Clarissa Dickson Wright	66	Celebrity chef and television presenter, surviving half of the Two Fat Ladies
30 March	Kate O'Mara	74	Actress (Howards' Way, Doctor Who)
31 March	Bob Larbey	79	Comedy script writer (The Good Life)
7 April	Peaches Geldof	25	Journalist, television presenter and model
11 April	Edna Doré	92	Actress (EastEnders, Les Misérables, Another Year, Doctor Who, Gavin & Stacey)
29 April	Bob Hoskins	71	Film and television actor (Van der Valk, Pennies from Heaven, The Long Good Friday, Who Framed Roger Rabbit, BT ad campaign, Hook, Nixon, Frasier, Mrs Henderson Presents, Outlaw, A Christmas Carol, Snow White and the Huntsman)
1 May	Eli Woods	91	Comedian and comic actor (Over the Garden Wall)
5 May	Timothy John Byford	72	Director and screenwriter
9 June	Rik Mayall	56	Actor and comedian (The Young Ones, Blackadder, Bottom, The New Statesman)
14 June	Sam Kelly	70	Actor (Porridge, 'Allo 'Allo!, Barbara)
14 June	Francis Matthews	86	Actor (Paul Temple, Captain Scarlet and the Mysterons)
17 June	Patsy Byrne	80	Actress (Blackadder II, Watching)
1 July	Marylyn Webb	66	Journalist (Calendar News)
1 July	Harry Whittaker	3	Actor (Leo Dingle in Emmerdale)
11 July	Ray Lonnen	74	Actor (Harry's Game)
14 July	John Milne	72	Journalist and broadcaster with BBC Scotland
17 July	Glenn Thomas	49	BBC journalist and World Health Organization press officer
17 July	Elaine Stritch	89	Actress (Two's Company)
23 July	Dora Bryan	91	Actress (Last of the Summer Wine)
28 July	Sally Farmiloe	60	Actress (Howards' Way)
31 July	Kenny Ireland	68	Actor and theatre director (Victoria Wood As Seen On TV, Benidorm)
1 August	Mike Smith	59	Television and radio presenter
24 August	Sir Richard Attenborough	90	Actor and film director
3 September	Roy Heather	79	Actor (Only Fools and Horses)
4 September	Clare Cathcart	48	Actress (Call the Midwife, Doctors)
11 September	Sir Donald Sinden	90	Actor (Two's Company, Never the Twain)
12 September	John Bardon	75	Actor (EastEnders, Rumpole of the Bailey)
14 September	Angus Lennie	84	Actor (The Great Escape, Crossroads, Doctor Who)
30 September	Sheila Tracy	80	Television announcer, radio broadcaster, and newsreader
1 October	Lynsey de Paul	64	Singer, songwriter, artist and presenter (singer of No, Honestly theme, presenter of Lynsey's Love Songs)
19 October	Lynda Bellingham	66	Actress, presenter and writer (Oxo ad campaign, All Creatures Great and Small, Second Thoughts, Faith in the Future, Loose Women, The Bill)
11 November	Rebekah Gibbs	41	Actress (Casualty)
12 November	Warren Clarke	67	Actor (Dalziel and Pascoe)
14 November	Cherry Wainer	79	Pianist with Lord Rockingham's XI (Oh Boy!, Lunchbox)
25 November	Arthur Montford	85	Broadcaster and sports commentator (Scotsport)
25 November	Joanna Dunham	78	Actress (Van der Valk, Sanctuary)
11 December	Tom Adams	76	Actor (The Onedin Line, The Great Escape)
11 December	Gerald Sim	89	Actor (Gandhi, Patriot Games, Frenzy)
20 December	John Freeman	99	Broadcaster and journalist (Face to Face)
21 December	Billie Whitelaw	82	Stage, film and television actress (Dixon of Dock Green)
23 December	Jeremy Lloyd	84	Comedy writer ('Allo 'Allo!, Are You Being Served?, Grace & Favour, Which Way to the War)
25 December	David Ryall	79	Actor (The Elephant Man, The Singing Detective, Inspector Morse, The Chief, The Men's Room, To Play the King, Outnumbered)
25 December	Bernard Kay	86	Actor (Coronation Street, Z-Cars, Doctor Who)

== See also ==
- 2014 in British music
- 2014 in British radio
- 2014 in the United Kingdom
- List of British films of 2014
