= Matthew Frank =

British television executive

- Born: 2 May 1961 (age 65); Nakuru, Kenya
- Education: Wye College, London University
- Occupations: CEO, The RightsXchange
- Spouse: Claire Browne
- Children: Finlay, Esme, Martha

Matthew Frank (born 2 May 1961) is a British television executive who is currently CEO of The RightsXchange, a new online marketplace for secondary TV rights. Matthew was formerly the CEO of RDF Rights and of Zodiak Rights and is also a company director of Dial Square 86

== Personal life and education ==
Matthew Frank was born in Nakuru, Kenya – the youngest of five children - where his father Peter worked for the Kenyan government running dairy farms. His family later moved to Malawi and Matthew was sent to boarding school in the UK. Matthew attended Austin Friars School in Carlisle before going on to study a Bsc (Hons) in Animal Science at London University (Wye College), graduating with a 2nd class degree.

== Career ==
Matthew’s first job after university was working for the Ministry of Agriculture as a Dairy Husbandry Advisor. He then went on to work as a commodity broker in The City of London trading sugar, coffee and potato futures for 5 years before changing direction and becoming a freelance radio journalist in 1990. He was a regular contributor on BBC Radio Four and Five and worked on shows such as Woman’s Hour, Science Now, The Health Show, The AM Alternative, and GLR Sports desk

== RDF ==
In 1994 Matthew joined his brother, David, at the production company RDF where Matthew was responsible for setting up the distribution arm, RDF Rights. The business began selling a small number of short news and business features each month but grew into one of the UK’s leading independent distributors of both television programmes produced by RDF and other independent producers with an annual turnover of around £30m, also being voted number 1 Distributor in Broadcast Magazine’s Peer Poll survey in 2006, 2007 and 2009.

By 2005, RDF revenues exceeded £40m and the company was floated on the London Stock Exchange (AIM) with a valuation of £49m.

In 2009, with revenues of approximately £150m, Matthew Frank was part of the members of the RDF management team that, supported by Cyrte Investments, led a management buy-out of the company for around £53m.

RDF merged with Zodiak in 2010 to become Zodiak Media, and Matthew Frank was named CEO of the newly created Zodiak Rights.

== Zodiak ==
The acquisition of RDF by Zodiak created one of the largest television ‘super-indies’ in the world, producing entertainment, factual, drama and kids' programming, with 45 companies operating in 17 countries and $800 million in annual revenues. Although Frank and other senior executives at the time were based in London, Zodiak Media Group is headquartered in Paris and with other key offices in, Los Angeles, Milan, Stockholm and Moscow. It is majority-owned by Italian conglomerate De Agostini and operates across the world.

Following the resignation of his brother, David Frank, as CEO of Zodiak Media Group in late 2013, Matthew Frank stepped down as CEO of Zodiak Rights in January 2014 and was succeeded in the position by Steve Macallister. By the time of his resignation, Frank had helped create a company that distributed 20,000 hours of content across the world including shows such as So You Think You Can Dance, Wife Swap, The Secret Millionaire, Being Human and The Returned.

== Dial Square 86 and TRX ==
In 2014, Matthew joined his brother David Frank in creating Dial Square 86, a next-generation content group which specialises in creating, financing and exploiting audio-visual content for media platforms worldwide. The company launched in October 2014 announcing its first acquisition, that of YouTube talent agency Red Hare Digital and announcing plans to invest in and acquire other companies that create, enhance or exploit content online or on TV.

In June 2015, Dial Square 86 announced the creation of The RightsXchange (TRX), an online marketplace for TV rights. It was announced that Matthew Frank was to become CEO of TRX, with David Frank acting as Chairman of TRX, and remaining as CEO of parent company Dial Square 86.
