= Ejector seat (disambiguation) =

An ejector seat or ejection seat is an aircraft emergency exit device.

Ejector Seat or ejection seat may also refer to:

- Ejector Seat, UK game show
- Ejector Seat Reservation, Swervedriver album
- Reverse bungee, catapult bungee, or sling shot, a fairground thrill ride
