= Arnis (name) =

Masculine given name

- Gender: Male
- Language: Latvian
- Name day: 7 June (Latvia)

Origin
- Region of origin: Latvia

Arnis is a Latvian masculine given name and may refer to:

- Arnis Balčus (born 1978), Latvian photography and video artist
- Arnis Mednis (born 1961), Latvian singer
- Arnis Rumbenieks (born 1988), Latvian track and field athlete and Olympic competitor
- Arnis Vecvagars (born 1974), Latvian basketball player and coach
- Arnis Zaļkalns (died 2014), Latvian convicted murderer and suspected murderer of a 14-year-old English girl, Alice Gross
