= The Necessary War =

The Necessary War may refer to:

- La Guerra Necesaria, a Cuban name for the Cuban War of Independence
- The Necessary War, an episode of the BBC World War I centenary season
