= Remarkable Entertainment =

British television production company

- Formerly: Remarkable Television (2009–2016)
- Type: Subsidiary
- Industry: Television
- Predecessors: Cheetah Television (1987–2009); Brighter Pictures (1992–2009); RDF Television
- Founded: 2009; 17 years ago
- Headquarters: London, England
- Parent: Banijay UK Productions
- Website: remarkable.tv

Remarkable Entertainment (formerly known as Remarkable Television) is a British television production company that is part of Banijay UK Productions which is part of French production & distribution company Banijay Entertainment. It was created through the merger of two British production companies Cheetah Television and Brighter Pictures by their Dutch parent company Endemol in 2009.

== History ==
In June 2014, Remarkable announced that establishment of their game-show division Remarkable Games with former head of entertainment at Remarkable Television named James Fox heading the new games division as their creative director.

In July 2020, Remarkable and its Dutch production & distribution parent Endemol Shine Group was merged into French production & distribution company Banijay Group (who owns its British subsidiaries) with Remarkable became a subsidiary of Banijay's UK division Banijay UK and became its new parent as Banijay's distribution arm Banijay Rights will distribute Remarkable's future programmes.

In July 2023, Banijay UK Productions announced the merger of Remarkable's factual production division Remarkable Factual into Banijay's other British factual production subsidiary RDF Television with Kitty Walshe stepping down of the CEO of both factual producers.

== Filmography ==
#	Title	Years	Network	Notes
1	Ready Steady Cook	1994–2021	BBC Two/BBC One	inherited from Cheetah Television
2	Deal or No Deal	2005–present (under Cheetah Television West between 2005-2009, (known as Known as Endemol West during series 1)	Channel 4/ITV1	inherited from Cheetah Television West
3	Only Connect	2008–present	BBC Four/BBC Two	inherited from Presentable and RDF Television
4	Pointless	2009–present	BBC Two/BBC One	inherited from Brighter Pictures
5	Celebrity Big Brother	2010 (2006-2009 under Brighter Pictures)	Channel 4	
6	Big Brother	2010 (2006-2009 under Brighter Pictures)	Channel 4	
7	Divided 2010	2010 (2006-2009 under Brighter Pictures)	rowspan="2"	ITV1
8	The Million Pound Drop	2010–2015; 2018–2019	Channel 4	
9	The Bank Job	2012	Channel 4	
10	Tipping Point	2012–present	ITV1	inherited from RDF Television and Fizz
11	The Common Denominator	2013	Channel 4	
12	Ejector Seat	2014	ITV1	
13	The Singer Takes It All	2014	Channel 4	co-production with Initial
14	Two Tribes	2014–2015	BBC Two	
15	The Big Spell	2017	Sky One	
16	House of Games	2017–present	BBC Two	
17	All Together Now	2018–2019	BBC One	
18	The Wall	2019–2022	BBC One	co-production with Glassman Media and Springhill Entertainment
19	The Birthday Cake Game	2021	BBC Radio 4	
20	Starstruck	2022–2023	ITV1	
21	The Big Interiors Battle	2023	Channel 4	
22	Survivor	2023	BBC One	
23	Genius Game	2025–present	ITV1	
24	Building the Band	2025	Netflix	
