= The Brits Who Built the Modern World =

British factual television series

- Genre: Factual
- Written by: Peter Sweasey
- Directed by: Peter Sweasey
- Country of origin: United Kingdom
- Original language: English
- No. of series: 1
- No. of episodes: 3

Production
- Executive producer: Nicholas Kent
- Producer: Peter Sweasey

Original release
- Network: BBC Four; BBC Four HD
- Release: 13 February – 27 February 2014

The Brits Who Built the Modern World is a British factual television series that was first broadcast on BBC Four from 13 to 27 February 2014. The three-part series tells the story of British architects Richard Rogers, Norman Foster, Nicholas Grimshaw, Michael Hopkins and Terry Farrell.

== Production ==
The series was produced with the Open University and a Royal Institute of British Architects exhibition (which also included Lady Patty Hopkins). The exhibition was open between 13 February and 27 May 2014.

== Episodes ==
No.	Title	Directed by	Written by	Original release date
1	"The Freedom of the Future"	Peter Sweasey	Peter Sweasey	13 February 2014
2	"The Power of the Past"	Peter Sweasey	Peter Sweasey	20 February 2014
3	"The Politics of Power"	Peter Sweasey	Peter Sweasey	27 February 2014

== Controversy ==
The series was the subject of controversy when the BBC were accused of removing Patty Hopkins from a photograph of the architects, used to illustrate the third programme of the series. Patty Hopkins had been a full partner in the Hopkins company from the outset. The BBC were accused of ignoring women architects, though the BBC responded by saying that at the start of making the series, the director met with both Michael and Patricia Hopkins to discuss their involvement in the series.
