= BBC World War I centenary season =

Logo for the centenary season

The BBC World War I centenary season was the marking of the centenary of the First World War across the BBC. Programming started in 2014 and lasted until 2018, corresponding to 100 years after the war. The BBC season included 130 newly-commissioned radio and television programmes which lasted over 2500 hours, including more than 600 hours of new content. The programmes were broadcast on over twenty BBC television and radio stations.

== Overview ==
The First World War centenary season was announced on 16 October 2013 by the BBC. Adrian Van Klaveren, the BBC World War I centenary controller called the project the "biggest and most ambitious pan-BBC project ever commissioned". The series featured a wide variety of programming that according to its producers were intended to present a more neutral and accurate picture of the war than the view commonly held by the public. In support of this goal, several programmes explored lesser-known topics such as the experiences of troops from New Zealand and Australia in the Gallipoli Campaign and several others focused on presenting the impact that the war had had on the world today. Other programmes attempted to show the effect that the war had on the individuals involved in it and one documentary showed numerous veteran interviews that were filmed for the BBC documentary The Great War on the conflict's fiftieth anniversary in 1964 but were omitted from that programme.

The series also featured a number of live broadcasts on the 100th anniversaries of significant events during the war, beginning with a broadcast from Sarajevo, the site of assassination of Archduke Franz Ferdinand of Austria, on 28 June 2014. Other event anniversaries had dedicated live broadcasts include the Battle of the Somme on 1 July 2016, the Battle of Jutland on 31 May 2016, and the Battle of Passchendaele on 31 July 2017, plus the annual Remembrance Sunday event at the Cenotaph.

The programmes were broadcast on over twenty different BBC television and radio stations including BBC One, BBC Two, BBC Three, BBC Four, BBC Parliament, BBC News, BBC World News, BBC Alba, CBBC, CBeebies, BBC World Service, BBC Radio 1, BBC Radio 2, BBC Radio 3, BBC Radio 4, BBC Radio Cymru, BBC Radio Ulster, BBC Radio Foyle, BBC Radio Scotland, BBC Radio nan Gàidheal and BBC Asian Network.

== Programmes ==
=== Documentaries ===
Programme	Presenter	Channel	Description
Britain's Great War	Jeremy Paxman	BBC One	Britain's Great War was co-produced with the Open University and presented by Jeremy Paxman. The series explores how Britain and its people were affected by the war.
Teenage Tommies	Fergal Keane	BBC Two	Fergal Keane discovers the stories of child soldiers.
The Story of Women in World War One	Kate Adie	BBC Two	The Story Of Women In World War One documents the accomplishments of women during the war.
WW1 Uncut	Dan Snow	BBC iPlayer	A series of short films offering a fresh perspective on some of the most fascinating aspects of WWI, shining a light on the real experience and answering key questions.
Royal Cousins at War	N/A	BBC Two	Royal Cousins At War consists of two parts, each lasting 60 minutes. The first part looks at the tensions between Queen Victoria's family members. The second part looks at how the European royal families contributed to the war. It will air on BBC Two and was produced by Blakeway Productions.
Pipers of the Trenches	N/A	BBC Two	Pipers Of The Trenches is a 60-minute documentary.
The Machine Gun & Skye's Band of Brothers	Neil Oliver	BBC Two	Presented by Neil Oliver, the 60 minute documentary describes the Maxim gun.
I Was There: The Great War Interviews	N/A	BBC Two	This 60 minute documentary is based on interviews conducted 50 years ago for The Great War.
Gallipoli	N/A	BBC Two	Gallipoli will focus on the Gallipoli Campaign which took place in the Ottoman Empire. The production company for this 60 minute documentary is Blakeway Productions.
The World's War	David Olusoga	BBC Two	David Olusoga, a historian and film-maker, provides the perspective of Indian, African and Asian troops. The two-part series will broadcast on BBC Two.
World War One's Forgotten Photographs	N/A	BBC Four	Testimony Films made this hour-long documentary for BBC Four. Photographs which were taken by British and German soldiers will have their stories revealed.
Forgotten Heroes – Indian Army in the Great War	N/A	BBC Radio 2	BBC Radio 2 tells the story of men from the British Indian Army through their letters.
Keep the Home Fires Burning	N/A	BBC Radio 2	This 60 documentary on BBC Radio 2 is about Ivor Novello and Keep the Home Fires Burning, the war song he composed in 1914.
1914 – Day by Day	Margaret MacMillan	BBC Radio 4	Margaret MacMillan will present daily from June to August 2014. Created by Somethin' Else, it is split into 42 parts with each one lasting four minutes for BBC Radio 4.
How Britain Went to War	Peter Hennessy	BBC Radio 4	Peter Hennessy describes how Britain planned the war on BBC Radio 4.
Month of Madness	Christopher Clark	BBC Radio 4	Christopher Clark explains the reasons for the war from the perspective of Sarajevo, Saint Petersburg, Berlin, Paris and London. Each part of the five-part series will run for 15 minutes and is produced by Blakeway Productions.
Voices of the First World War	N/A	BBC Radio 4	Voices Of The First World War will be co-produced by Imperial War Museums and made for BBC Radio 4. The series describes what happened according to those who were fighting.
Real Time World War One on the Jeremy Vine Show	Jeremy Vine	BBC Radio 2	Real Time World War One sees Jeremy Vine present events as they unfolded on BBC Radio 2. Unique Productions produced 15 15-minute parts.
The War that Changed the World	Amanda Vickery	BBC World Service; BBC Radio 3	Amanda Vickery presents the series which sees BBC World Service, BBC Radio 3 and the British Council partner to show the impact of the war on the different countries that took part.
India's Forgotten War	Anita Rani	BBC World Service	Anita Rani tells us about India's response to the war in this documentary.
I Don't Remember the War	N/A	BBC World Service	In this series on the BBC World Service, writers aged under 36 explore what their ancestors did during the war.
Our World War	N/A	BBC Three	This series is based on what people have told us.

=== Historical debate ===
Programme	Channel	Description
The Pity of War	BBC Two	Niall Ferguson argues that Britain should have stayed out of war in this 90 minute debate for BBC Two.
The Necessary War	BBC Two	Max Hastings argues in The Necessary War that Britain was right to enter the war in this 60 minute debate for BBC Two.
To War	BBC Parliament	Mark D’Arcy describes the Parliamentary speeches and political actions that lead to Britain fighting in the war on BBC Parliament.
Long Shadow	BBC Two	David Reynolds goes over the legacy of the war. The three-part series was produced by ClearStory for BBC Two.
Rethinking the Culture of World War One	BBC Radio 3	In Cradle of Jazz Alyn Shipton tells us about the birth of jazz as a result of African-American troops being sent to America and Europe with their music.
Woman's Hour	BBC Radio 4	Woman's Hour shows how the war affected women.
The Battle for the Meaning of World War One	BBC Radio 4	The Battle for the Meaning of World War One questions which version of the war we commemorate.

=== Arts and music ===
The following Arts & Music programmes were shown: Artists of War, Writers of the Somme, The Great War – An Elegy: A Culture Show Special, The Poet who Loved the War: Ivor Gurney, 1914–1918 – The Cultural Front, Music on the Brink, The Ballads of the Great War, Live in Concert – The Vienna Philharmonic in Sarajevo, A Soldier and a Maker – Ivor Gurney on Radio 3, Music in the Great War and Soldier Songs.

=== Drama ===
The following drama programmes were broadcast: The Crimson Field, The Passing-Bells, War Poems, Great War Diaries, 37 Days, Our World War, Oh, What a Lovely War, All is Calm – The Christmas Truce, War Horse, Home Front and Tommies.

=== Across the UK ===
The following programmes were broadcast across the UK: Ireland's Great War, My Great-Granddad's Great War, With Love from the Front, The Man who Shot the Great War, Our Place in the War, And the Band Played Waltzing Matilda, Ballad of the Unknown Soldier, The Photograph/An Dealbh, Diary of World War One, Eòrpa – HMS Timbertown, The Handsome Lads/Na Gillean Grinn, The Battlefield/Sìnt' Sa Bhlàr, The School That Went to War, Shinty Heroes/Curaidhean Na Camanachd, Weekly War Briefing/Seachdain Sa Chogadh, Small Hands in a Big War, The Writers' Propaganda Bureau, Welsh Towns at War, Cymry 24, The Welsh and World War One/Cymry’r Rhyfel Byd Cyntaf, The Greatest Welshman Never Heard Of, The Great War Live, Wales and the Great War Today, The Man they Couldn't Kill – Frank Richards and the Great War and Stiwdio.

=== Children ===
Programme	Channel	Description
Horrible Histories	CBBC	A 40-minute episode of Horrible Histories described how Girl Guides passed secret information, the war trenches and the football match during the Christmas truce.
Emily's Army	CBBC	Emily's Army was a three-part series set during the war.
My Story	CBeebies	Nicky Campbell presented this 15-minute special which compares the past with the present.
Operation Ouch! Goes Back in Time	CBBC	A special episode of Operation Ouch! showed what medicine was like during the war.

=== Special editions ===
Programme	Channel	Description
Antiques Roadshow	BBC One	Two episodes of Antiques Roadshow marked the 2014 centenary on BBC One.
Countryfile	BBC One	A special Remembrance Sunday edition of Countryfile
Songs of Praise	BBC One	Two episodes of Songs of Praise filmed in Belgium and France marked the centenary on BBC One. The first one, The Shadow of War, was broadcast in August 2014 and was presented by Bill Turnbull. The second episode, War and Peace, was about the carols which were popular during the war.
The Why Factor	BBC World Service	Mike Williams looks at sacrifice and memorialisation in a special episode of The Why Factor.
Railways of the Great War with Michael Portillo	BBC Two	Michael Portillo uncovers World War One's railway story, 100 years on. Each episode uncovered how the entire conflict, from start to finish, was a railway war: from the very earliest military planning prior to the declaration of war until the signing of the armistice in a railway carriage in Compiègne.
Casualty Entrenched	BBC One	Rita is promoted to Senior Staff Nurse. Mac attends a war memorial service. A football fan riot starts and a young boy is caught up in the fight. A flare is set off in the ED and smoke alarms wail. Matthew protects everyone from the blast and Lofty saves the young boy's life by dragging him out of cubicles. Dylan appears back in ED and treats the boy, who later dies. Big Mac as he is having trouble dealing with Jeff's death and a transfer back to ED is suggested.
