= The Passing Bells =

- DVD cover with Jack Lowden (l) and Patrick Gibson (r)
- Genre: Historical drama
- Written by: Tony Jordan
- Directed by: Brendan Maher
- Starring: Patrick Gibson; Jack Lowden
- Composer: John Lunn
- Country of origin: United Kingdom
- Original language: English
- No. of series: 1
- No. of episodes: 5

Production
- Production location: Poland
- Running time: 30 minutes
- Production company: Red Planet Pictures

Original release
- Network: BBC One; BBC One HD; TVP 1 (Poland); TVP 1 HD (Poland)
- Release: 3 November – 7 November 2014

The Passing Bells (Polish: Dzwony wojny) is a five-part British-Polish television drama that was first broadcast on BBC One in 2014. The series is set during World War I and was a part of the BBC First World War centenary season.

It shows events through the eyes of two very ordinary teenagers, one from England and one from Germany, who enlist in the war, which they expect will be over within months. The drama stars Patrick Gibson and Jack Lowden, and was written by Tony Jordan and directed by Brendan Maher.

== Plot ==
The series operates in parallel as it follows two teenagers in two countries, one German (Jack Lowden) and one British (Patrick Gibson), who sign up as soldiers at the outbreak of the First World War. The plot covers the time period from just prior to the war to its conclusion.

The story includes the boys' families, their love interests, and the friends and comrades they make during the war. It reveals the toll the war takes on the two young men and their fellow soldiers as it lasts far longer than expected, and grows harsher and more meaningless. The two soldiers encounter each other at certain points, including at the conclusion of the war.

== Cast ==
- Patrick Gibson – Tommy Edwards, a teen in England who enjoys sketching birds
- Jack Lowden – Michael Lang, a carefree teen in Germany
- Erika Kaar – Joanna, a young Polish nurse Tommy meets when wounded
- Sabrina Bartlett – Katie, Michael's girlfriend in Germany
- Brian Fletcher – Derek, a frightened underage British recruit Tommy takes under his wing
- Jennifer Hennessy – Susan Lang, Michael's mother
- Simon Kunz – William Lang, Michael's farmer father
- Amanda Drew – Annie Edwards, Tommy's mother
- Alex Ferns – David Edwards, Tommy's father
- Hubert Burton – Cyril, a young British soldier who tries to keep things humorous
- Matthew Aubrey – Kenny Bond, a British soldier who becomes a corporal
- Wilf Scolding – Freddie, a young German soldier
- Mark Burghagen – Erich, a gruff and defeatist German soldier
- Adam Long – Anthony, a young British soldier
- Ben McGregor – Kevin, a young British soldier
- Felix Auer – Lanzo, a young German soldier

== Production ==
The series was announced by the BBC in October 2013, along with other programmes that played a part in the BBC World War I centenary season. It was a Red Planet Production with BBC Worldwide as the distributor. Filming took place in Poland. Telewizja Polska and Apple Film Production were co-producers.

The series aired in the pre-watershed time-slot of 7pm, and the script was written for a younger audience and family viewing. The title was taken from the first line of Wilfred Owen's 1917 poem, "Anthem for Doomed Youth": "What passing-bells for these who die as cattle?"

== Broadcast and home video ==
The series was broadcast on five consecutive days on BBC 1 beginning on 3 November 2014. In Australia, the series premiered on BBC First on 28 May 2015.

The Region 2 DVD was released on 10 November 2014. The streaming video is available on various services.
