= RDF Television =

British television production company

- Type: Subsidiary
- Industry: Television
- Founded: 1993; 33 years ago
- Founder: David Frank; Matthew Frank
- Defunct: February 2, 2024; 2 years ago
- Fate: Merged with and folded into Remarkable Entertainment; restructuring shut down
- Successor: Remarkable Entertainment; Zodiak Kids & Family Productions UK
- Owner: Zodiak Media (2011–2016); Banijay Entertainment S.A. (2016–2024)
- Parent: Banijay UK (2020–2024)
- Divisions: RDF West

RDF Television was a British independent television production company that was owned by French production & distribution group Zodiak Media since 2010 before being merged with Banijay Entertainment (then Banijay Group) in 2016, which folded it into Remarkable Entertainment in 2024. It was founded in 1993 by David Frank after stepping down as a reporter at the BBC. The name ceased in 2024.

== History ==
RDF Television was founded in 1993 by David Frank after stepping down as a reporter at the BBC.

A year later in 1994 following RDF Television's establishment, RDF Television launched its own distribution division called RDF Rights with David Frank's brother Matthew Frank joining RDF Television's distribution arm as its CEO.

=== Expansion into other genres (2005–2008) ===
In October 2005, RDF Television's parent company RDF Media Group was in exclusive talks to acquire Glasgow-based Scottish independent production company and co-production partner behind Location, Location, Location named IWC Media in order for RDF to expand their regional production outputs. The deal would could expand RDF's factual production activities as their parent RDF Media Group previously had a partnership with the Scottish production company with RDF's distribution division RDF Rights distributed IWC's factual programming internationally before the announcement to acquire IWC. Two months later in December of that same year, RDF Media Group completed their acquisition of Glasgow-based Scottish independent production company IWC Media with Alan Clements remained CEO and president of the acquired company

In April 2006, RDF Media Group had brought rival Cardiff-based Welsh poker television production company Presentable, giving RDF Media Group their own Welsh television production subsidiary and an entry into the Welsh production business.

In August 2006, RDF Television under their parent company RDF Media Group announced that they had acquired Kent-based children's television producer The Foundation.

In October 2006, RDF Media Group launched a digital arm named RDF Digital Media.

In February 2008, RDF Media Group acquired factual independent producer History Television International as their expansion of its factual operations.

=== Acquisitions, restructuring and shut down (2010–2024) ===
In June 2010, RDF Television alongside its parent RDF Media Group had been bought by Swedish/French entertainment production and distribution group Zodiak Entertainment, bringing together RDF Media Group's operations with Zodiak Entertainment's operations; RDF Media Group's CEO and founder and David Frank became the new CEO of the enlarged Zodiak Entertainment group along with chairman and CEO of both De Agostini Group and Zodiak Entertainment. Lorenzo Pellicioli continued to serve as chairman of the combined group.

Three months later in September of 2010, Zodiak Entertainment announced that they were rebranding themselves by renaming it to Zodiak Media Group following Zodiak's acquisition of British independent production company RDF Media Group, with RDF's international division RDF Rights being folded into Zodiak International Distribution and renamed to Zodiak Rights.

In November 2021, RDF Television restructured its operations by appointing founders of Banijay's fellow production subsidiary Definitely Rachel Arnold and Jon Green as RDF's respectively creative director and creative director of development with RDF taking over Banijay's fellow production subsidiary Definitely from Zepptron as a subsidiary of RDF Television with its founders continued leading the company under RDF whilst Little Wonder was spun off from Banijay's factual production unit Wonder and became RDF Television's subsidiary as founder Claire Morrison continued leading Little Wonder under RDF Television.

In July 2023, Banijay Entertainment announced the merger of RDF Television with Banijay's fellow British factual production subsidiary Remarkable Factual, whilst retaining the RDF brand with Kitty Walshe stepping down of the CEO of both factual producers.

== Filmography ==
Title	Years	Network	Notes
The Crystal Maze	1990–2020	Channel 4/E4	inherited from Chartsworth Television under RDF West co-production with Fizz
The Block	2004	ITV	
Ladette to Lady	2005–2010	ITV	
Anthea Turner: Perfect Housewife	2006–2007	BBC Three	
Dementia & Us	2021	BBC Two	co-production with Wonder
Shop Well for the Planet?	2021	BBC One	as RDF West
