= Auf Wiedersehen My Pet =

- Genre: Factual entertainment
- Narrated by: Ruth Rogers
- Country of origin: United Kingdom
- Original language: English
- No. of series: 1
- No. of episodes: 20 (list of episodes)

Production
- Production location: United Kingdom
- Running time: 60 minutes (including adverts)
- Production company: Shine Limited

Original release
- Network: ITV
- Release: 17 March 2014 – present

Auf Wiedersehen My Pet is a British television series that began airing on ITV on 17 March 2014. The series was produced by Shine Limited, with the first series airing for 20 episodes.

== Format ==
Each episode follows a pet owner who must make the decision to relinquish their animals due to personal reasons.

== Episode guide ==
| Episode | Original Air Date | Pet | Breed |
|---|---|---|---|
| 1 | 17 March 2014 | Rosie | Lakeland Terrier |
| 2 | 18 March 2014 | Skye | Horse |
| 3 | 19 March 2014 | Summer, Oliver, Maggie & Poppy | Guinea Pigs |
| 4 | 20 March 2014 | Missy | Dog |
| 5 | 21 March 2014 | Revisit | |
| 6 | 24 March 2014 | Bill & Tilly | Pygmy goats |
| 7 | 25 March 2014 | Toby | Parrot |
| 8 | 26 March 2014 | Baloo | Dog |
| 9 | 27 March 2014 | Rocky | Horse |
| 10 | 28 March 2014 | Revisit | |
| 11 | 31 March 2014 | Tyson | Staffie-cross |
| 12 | 1 April 2014 | Bob & Tiggy | Guinea Pigs |
| 13 | 2 April 2014 | Molly | Cat |
| 14 | 3 April 2014 | George | Parrot |
| 15 | 4 April 2014 | Revisit | |
| 16 | 7 April 2014 | Gloria-Jane | Dog |
| 17 | 8 April 2014 | Isis & Cerce | Rabbits |
| 18 | 9 April 2014 | Rosie | Collie |
| 19 | 10 April 2014 | Milo-Jo | Cocker Spaniel |
| 20 | 11 April 2014 | Revisit | |
