= The Singer Takes It All =

British TV talent show 2014

- Genre: Talent
- Presented by: Alan Carr
- Country of origin: United Kingdom
- Original language: English
- No. of series: 1
- No. of episodes: 4

Production
- Executive producers: Nic McNeilis; Karen Troop
- Production location: Elstree Studios
- Running time: 60 minutes (inc. adverts)
- Production companies: Initial and Remarkable Television

Original release
- Network: Channel 4
- Release: 1 August – 22 August 2014

Related
- Your Face Sounds Familiar; Sing If You Can

The Singer Takes It All is a British talent game show hosted by comedian Alan Carr, airing on Channel 4. The show premiered on 1 August 2014.

In 2015, Channel 4 announced that the programme had been cancelled after one series.

== Format ==
Contestants perform on a moving stage (18m in length) which will be manipulated by viewers who can vote up to four times during each performance on a special app. The acts who impress the audience will move towards a 'Gold Zone' where contestants will compete for a cash prize. If, however, they fail to impress, they will be sent to the back of the stage and out of the show.

The viewers will be able to choose 'Hit' or 'Miss' depending on whether they like a contestant's performance on The Singer Takes It All mobile app.

The contestant who stays in the Gold Zone for the longest amount of time will go through to the final where they can win up to £15,000, the commentator of the show (only seen as a giant pair of lips) is former The X Factor contestant Brenda Edwards.

The show ended up being dominated by a singer named Steve Dorsett who appeared on 3 of the 4 shows, winning all 3 and netting himself a total of £42,600.

=== App ===
The Singer Takes It All official free mobile app was released in July 2014.

On 31 July 2014, a day before the first live show, Channel 4 revealed that over 1 million votes had been cast via the official app. Since its launch, the app had been downloaded around 35,000 times.

== Celebrity guests and ratings ==
Official episode viewing figures are from BARB.

| Episode | Original air date | Celebrity guests | Total viewers (millions) | Weekly ranking (for Channel 4) |
|---|---|---|---|---|
| 1 | 1 August 2014 | Pixie Lott & Rob Beckett | 1.16 | 12 |
| 2 | 8 August 2014 | Paddy McGuinness | 1.08 | 15 |
| 3 | 15 August 2014 | Rizzle Kicks | 0.87 | 26 |
| 4 | 22 August 2014 | Jason Manford | 0.75 | 30 |
