= Immigration Street =

Documentary Series

Immigration Street is a Channel 4 documentary series about the people living in Derby Road, Southampton, England. This area is ethnically diverse with a large number of immigrants.

It started as a spin-off of the show Benefits Street, originally set for six episodes, but reduced due to protest from local residents.

== Concerns from the community ==
The local police requested to be shown the series prior to airing, expressing concern that the series could cause far-right groups to focus on the area of Derby Road.

A Member of Parliament for Southampton Test, Alan Whitehead, stated that he had asked local residents and that "Over 95% of the people we received replies from were opposed to the filming of the programme and were worried how their area and community would be portrayed."

Steve Townsend, who chaired the Southampton City Clinical Commissioning Group (CCG), was quoted in the Southern Daily Echo as saying, "We wholeheartedly support the local community in its condemnation of the programme especially as the potential harm it will do will outweigh any public interest."

The crew filming the show had eggs and flour thrown at them.

The BBC announced that because of disruptions while filming by locals, Channel 4 took the decision to create fewer episodes than planned.
