= David Frank (media executive) =

British media executive (1958–2021)

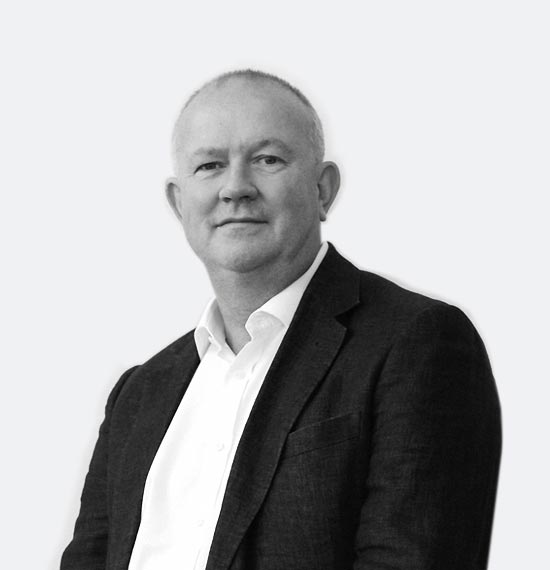
- Frank in 2014
- Born: David Vincent Mutrie Frank; 24 September 1958; Nakuru, Kenya
- Died: 11 November 2021 (aged 63)
- Education: Trinity College, Oxford
- Occupation: CEO Dial Square 86
- Spouse: Isabelle Tuquet de Beauregard
- Children: 3

David Vincent Mutrie Frank (24 September 1958 – 11 November 2021) was the CEO of Dial Square 86 and the chairman of The RightsXchange, which is an online marketplace for TV rights. He was the founder of RDF Media (which created international TV hits Faking it, Wife Swap, and The Secret Millionaire) and the onetime CEO of Zodiak Media SA (the super-indie whose portfolio of hits include The Girl with the Dragon Tattoo, Totally Spies! and The Inbetweeners). He was also Chairman (and a shareholder) of Mint Digital, a digital product development studio in London and New York, and Objekt Films, a London-based film and video content creation company.

== Personal life and education ==
Frank was born in Nakuru, Kenya, the son of Joy (née Sollis) and Peter Frank. He was educated at Trinity College, Oxford, where he graduated with a BA in Jurisprudence. Frank was married to Isabelle (née Tuquet de Beauregard) Frank, and had three children.

He died on 11 November 2021, aged 63.

== Career ==
Prior to running one of the world's biggest TV production companies Frank spent five years working in investment banking in London, first with Hill Samuel and latterly with Swiss Bank Corporation. Following his time in finance he decided to pursue a career in journalism, first in newspapers – Euromoney – and subsequently working for the BBC as a television reporter specialising in business and finance.

=== RDF Media ===
After three years at the BBC, he left to set up his own independent production company, RDF Media, in 1993 with £35,000 start-up capital. His brother, Matthew Frank, joined RDF in 1994 to establish the company's distribution arm. Originally the company focused on the production of factual programmes but rapidly expanded into other genres such as entertainment, drama and children's, establishing itself as a leading force in TV production in the UK.

Within 10 years RDF was turning over around £32m a year. In 2000 the company established a successful presence in the US.

In 2002, Frank turned down the opportunity to become the Chief Executive at Channel Five.

By 2005, revenues exceeded £40m and the company was floated on the London Stock Exchange (AIM) with a valuation of £49m.

In 2006, RDF won its third 'Best Independent Production Company' award at the annual Broadcast Awards, adding to wins in 2002 and 2004. It was the first and, as of 2016, the only company to have won the award three times.

==== Queengate Affair ====
In July 2007, RDF became embroiled in a controversy concerning a documentary series the company was making about the Queen. The incident, which became known as Queengate, centred on manipulation of footage in a promotional tape for the series which was shown to journalists at a BBC One press event purporting to show the Queen storming out of a photoshoot with Annie Leibovitz. The affair led to the resignations of RDF Director of Programmes Stephen Lambert and BBC One Controller Peter Fincham.

==== Management Buy-Out ====
The controversy resulted in a sharp fall in the RDF share price on AIM. In 2009, with revenues now of approximately £150m and in response to the fall in the share price, Frank led a management buy-out of the company's shares supported by Dutch private equity firm Dasym Investment Strategies (formerly Cyrte Investments).

In July 2010, RDF Media was sold to Zodiak Entertainment, for a reported £150m, and Frank was appointed the CEO of the enlarged group, now renamed Zodiak Media.

=== Zodiak Media ===
The acquisition of RDF Media, in 2010, created a £500m "super-indie" global production giant, Zodiak Media. Zodiak Media is an independent media company that produces entertainment, factual, drama and kids' programming, with 45 companies operating in 17 countries and $800 million in annual revenues. It is headquartered in Paris and with other key offices in London, Los Angeles, Milan, Stockholm and Moscow. It is majority-owned by Italian conglomerate De Agostini and operates across the world.

Following his appointment as CEO in July 2010, Frank rebranded Zodiak Entertainment as Zodiak Media and organised the group along geographical divisions to replace the acquired group brands (Marathon Media Group, Magnolia, Zodiak Entertainment and RDF Media). He launched a “creativity and innovation unit” at the centre of the group to look for shows and formats with the best chance of becoming international hits. In 2011 Zodiak acquired UK comedy producer Bwark Productions (makers of hit TV series and movie The Inbetweeners). Under Frank, the group also made its first scripted series for a US broadcaster (Being Human for SyFy Channel). Frank also oversaw a $267m refinancing of the group's debt through a deal with a syndicate of international banks.

Frank informed majority owner De Agostini several months prior to his departure of his intent to leave Zodiak at the end of 2013.

During his two decades in TV, Frank gained a reputation as an executive who, although driven by business, was capable of creating a very enjoyable working environment.

=== Dial Square 86 and TRX ===
Frank was the CEO of Dial Square 86, which he founded after leaving Zodiak Media. The company launched in 2014.

In June 2015, Frank announced the creation of The RightsXchange (TRX), an online marketplace for TV rights. David Frank remained CEO of Dial Square 86, the parent company of the new venture, and was also chairman of TRX.

In August 2016, TRX announced that it had received co-investment from Sky and Channel 4, marking the first time that the two companies had jointly invested in a start up.
