= Rome: The World's First Superpower =

- Genre: Documentary
- Narrated by: Larry Lamb
- Country of origin: United Kingdom
- Original language: English
- No. of series: 1

Production
- Production companies: 360 and Motion Content Group

Original release
- Network: Channel 5
- Release: October 2014

Rome: The World's First Superpower is a 2014 Channel 5 television series in 4 episodes narrated by Larry Lamb about the Roman Empire first broadcast in October 2014. The series combined input from historians and CGI to present the history of ancient Rome.

== Episode I: "City of Blood" ==
In the first episode Larry Lamb visits Rome and describes how the Roman Empire was created by Romulus, using the works of ancient Roman historian Livy as a guide, starting with Rome's 2767th birthday celebrations in April 2014. According to Lucy Mangan, writing in The Guardian, "Larry Lamb’s breathless account of the history of the Eternal City did away with the nuances – and was all the better for it"

== Episode II: "Total War" ==
The second episode starts at the Roma Termini railway station where we are led to discover how the city of Rome was sacked and razed to the ground by the Gauls who also killed many of its citizens, which led to the construction of a great wall to protect the city from future raids, many parts of the wall are preserved around Rome to the present day.

== Episode III: "Death of a Hero" ==
In this episode we learn how Tiberius Gracchus became a "champion of the common citizen farmer" which would ultimately result in his downfall; and the hypocaust, a central heating system.

== Episode IV: "Caesar" ==
The final episode covers the life of Julius Caesar and the Triumvirate of Caesar, Crassus and Pompey
