= The Mekong River with Sue Perkins =

- Presented by: Sue Perkins
- Country of origin: United Kingdom

Original release
- Network: BBC
- Release: 2014

The Mekong River with Sue Perkins is a television show on the BBC.
