= Jamie's Comfort Food =

- Presented by: Jamie Oliver
- Country of origin: United Kingdom
- Original language: English
- No. of series: 1
- No. of episodes: 8

Production
- Running time: 30 minutes

Original release
- Network: Channel 4
- Release: 1 September – 20 October 2014

Jamie's Comfort Food is a UK food lifestyle programme which was broadcast on Channel 4 in 2014. In each half-hour episode, Jamie Oliver creates three 'comfort food' dishes including snacks, mains and desserts. A tie-in book of recipes was released in September 2014.

== Episodes ==
No.	Title
1	"Ultimate Burger, Lobster Mac & Cheese and Marshmallow Pavlova"
Oliver cooks the ultimate burger with Christian Stevenson, rich lobster mac and cheese and double layer marshmallow pavlova.
2	"Bolognese Ravioli, Cheese Toastie and Chicken Tikka Masala"
Oliver cooks bolognese ravioli with Gennaro Contaldo, the perfect toasted cheese sandwich, and chicken tikka masala cooked on an open fire.
3	"Steak Sandwich, Sticky Toffee Pudding and Osso Bucco"
Oliver makes the perfect steak and onion sandwich, glazed sticky toffee pudding with his mother, and osso bucco with risotto Milanese.
4	"Chicken Kiev, Spaghetti Vongole, and Shepherd's Pie"
Oliver rustles up a chicken Kiev with his father, spaghetti vongole with rosé and tomato, and a deluxe slow roasted lamb shepherd's pie.
5	"Curried Fish Pie, Butter and Sage Gnudi and Hummingbird Cake"
Oliver makes the family classic: fish pie with a curry twist, butter and sage gnudi, and a hummingbird cake topped with smashed pecan brittle.
6	"Jerk Ham with Egg and Chips, Chocolate Nougat Cake and Chicken Kebab"
Oliver cooks a full jerk ham with a side of egg and chips, plus crispy chocolate nougat cake. Later he cooks a jumbo chicken shawarma.
7	"Duck Lasagne, Huevos Rancheros and Bacon Sarnies"
Oliver makes a crispy roast duck lasagne, fresh spicy huevos rancheros and works with his friend Pete Begg to create the ultimate bacon sandwich.
8	"Fish and Chips, Gado Gado and Crab Linguine"
Oliver shows how to cook crispy fish and chips, Indonesia's favourite comfort food: gado gado, and perfect crab linguine.
