= Murder of Alice Gross =

2014 murder in London, England

Alice Gross
- Born: Alice Poppy Madeleine Gross; 14 February 2000; London, England
- Disappeared: 28 August 2014 (aged 14); London, England
- Cause of death: Murder by asphyxiation
- Body discovered: 30 September 2014; River Brent, London, England
- Known for: Murder victim

Alice Gross (14 February 2000 – 28 August 2014) was an English girl who was murdered in West London. Her body was found hidden on the bed of the River Brent on September 30, five weeks after she disappeared.

== Missing case ==
Alice Poppy Madeleine Gross was a 14-year-old girl who suffered from anorexia, which was suggested by her mother and some mainstream media sources in the early days of the search for her as being related to her disappearance. She lived in Hanwell, West London, with her sister, Nina Gross, and parents, Jose Gross and Rosalind Hodgkiss. She went missing after leaving her home on 28 August 2014. The search for her was the largest deployment of Metropolitan Police officers in a search operation since the 7 July 2005 London bombings. It involved 600 officers from eight services.

== Suspects ==
Two men were arrested in connection with Gross's death; both were later released without charge.

The prime suspect was Latvian builder and convicted murderer Arnis Zalkalns, who went missing from Ealing, West London, on 3 September.

== Murder inquiry ==
On 1 October, police launched a murder inquiry after Gross's decomposed body was found hidden under logs on the bed of the River Brent the night before. On 4 October, police announced that they had found a badly decomposed body in dense woodland in Boston Manor Park during their search for Zalkalns, and that early indications suggested the body might be his. Police confirmed two days later that the body was that of Zalkalns. The cause of his death was hanging.

== Community involvement ==
The local community of Hanwell was galvanised during the time Gross was missing, and a poster campaign to "Find Alice" was organised through a Facebook page. In order to increase public awareness of Gross being missing, the community tied yellow ribbons to trees, railings, their cars and homes. Ealing Borough Council flew flags at half-mast following the discovery of Gross's body, opened a public book of condolence and replanted flower beds near to the Hanwell Clock Tower with yellow pansies in Gross's memory.

== Police briefing ==
In a briefing on 28 January 2015, the Metropolitan Police stated that "all the evidence points firmly to Arnis Zalkalns" and that he would have been charged if he had not hanged himself.

== Lost inquest file ==
On 26 July 2015, it was reported that a 30-page document relating to the case had been lost after West London coroner Chinyere Inyama left it on a train. Inyama subsequently was told to reassign the case to another coroner, and it was taken by Dr Fiona Wilcox.

== See also ==
- Lists of solved missing person cases
