= Ejector Seat =

- Genre: Game show
- Presented by: Andi Peters
- Country of origin: United Kingdom
- Original language: English
- No. of series: 1
- No. of episodes: 30

Production
- Production location: Dock10 studios
- Running time: 60 minutes (inc. adverts)
- Production company: Remarkable Television

Original release
- Network: ITV
- Release: 28 April – 6 June 2014

Ejector Seat is a British game show, presented by former Children's BBC presenter Andi Peters, that aired on ITV from 28 April to 6 June 2014 as a temporary spring replacement for Tipping Point.

Six contestants compete for a chance to win up to £10,000 cash on each episode. They sit in armchairs mounted on parallel tracks that stretch the length of the stage. The farthest one-fourth of each track is lit up red as a "danger zone." If a contestant moves all the way through their danger zone to the end of the track, they are eliminated from the game and "ejected" by being tipped backward out of their chair amid a burst of light and dry ice smoke.

In an interview with the Gloucestershire Echo, Peters stated that it was not answering the questions that was difficult; it was answering them whilst on the move that contestants struggled with.

== Format ==
=== Round 1 ===
Initially positioned halfway along the track, the contestants answer toss-up questions on the buzzer. A correct response moves a contestant to the start of the track and advances them to the next round, while a miss sends them to the end and ejects them. The round ends when either one contestant has been ejected or five have advanced, with the sixth being automatically ejected in the latter case.

=== Round 2 ===
The host asks one question to each contestant in turn. A correct answer allows them to stay where they are, but a miss sends them along the track; the questions then continue, and the contestant can only stop and end their turn by giving a correct answer. After a contestant is ejected, the others return to the start of the track; the round ends after two ejections.

The movement speed of the seats increases after each of the first three passes through the field. If no one has been ejected after four passes, a "sudden death" playoff is conducted under the rules of Round 1. The speed is reset to its lowest level after the first ejection.

At the start of this round, each contestant is given a "Panic Button" to use one time during the remainder of the game. Once a contestant enters the danger zone, they may press this button to stop moving. The current question (if any) is thrown out, and the host asks a multiple-choice question with three answer options. A correct answer moves the contestant to the leading edge of their danger zone and ends their turn, but a miss ejects them immediately.

=== Round 3 ===
A toss-up question is asked on the buzzer to all three contestants, who are initially positioned at the start of the track. A correct answer allows a contestant to sit out the next question; if one of the other two answers it correctly, the third begins to move and can only stop by answering another question correctly or using their Panic Button, as in Round 2. An incorrect answer on a toss-up question starts the contestant moving immediately. Once a contestant stops moving, a new set of toss-ups is asked. The round ends after one ejection.

=== Head-to-Head ===
All questions in this round are asked as toss-ups to both remaining contestants, and they are initially positioned at the start of the track. A correct answer to the first question starts the opponent moving, while a miss causes that contestant to move instead. For all subsequent questions, a correct answer by the moving contestant stops them and sets the opponent moving. Conversely, if a stationary contestant misses a question, they begin to move and the opponent stops. Correct answers from the stationary contestant and incorrect ones from the moving contestant have no effect. If a contestant uses the Panic Button and successfully avoids ejection, a new question is asked to determine who will move next as at the start of the round.

After one contestant has been ejected, the opponent advances to the final.

=== Final Round ===
Initially placed at the start of the track, the contestant must answer three sets of questions, each 45 seconds in length; they begin moving after a miss, but stop on a correct answer. The Panic Button is no longer in play. After completing a set, the contestant begins the next one from their current position and the movement speed increases. The contestant wins £500 for completing the first set, £1,000 for the second, and £10,000 for the third, and is automatically ejected after winning the full prize.

== Filming ==
The series consists of thirty episodes, and was filmed next to Channel 4's Countdown. During filming, the seats malfunctioned and producers had to run on and off the stage in order to fix them. This left some audience members disgruntled, and they had to be bribed to stay by being given chocolates.

== Broadcast ==
The show forms part of a shake-up of ITV daytime programming; Tipping Point was replaced by Ejector Seat and The Chase was replaced by The Paul O'Grady Show. Good Morning Britain and Jo Frost: Family Matters were also introduced that week. The Chase returned on 6 May 2014.

== Critical reception ==
The game show has been the subject of some criticism, with Marion McMullen of the Coventry Telegraph accusing that the idea of tipping over chairs had been stolen from The Graham Norton Show and was "a gimmick too far". She also stated that the show was an inferior replacement for Tipping Point. That said, the Digital Spy team called it a "delight" and said "[we] can't wait to see more people being tipped back into their Ejector Seat chairs".
