= Michael Hopkins (architect) =

English architect (1935–2023)

Sir Michael Hopkins CBE RA
- Born: Michael John Hopkins; 7 May 1935; Poole, Dorset, England
- Died: 17 June 2023 (aged 88)
- Education: Sherborne School, Dorset, and Architectural Association
- Occupation: Architect
- Spouse: Patty Hopkins (m. 1962)
- Children: 3
- Awards: Knight Bachelor (1995)

Sir Michael John Hopkins CBE RA (7 May 1935 – 17 June 2023) was an English architect.

The RIBA Royal Gold Medal-winning architect founded Hopkins Architects with his wife Patty and was widely regarded as among the greatest of contemporary British architectural figures. Michael, alongside Patty, was part of a small group of leading British architects who were regarded as the founders of the "High-Tech" architectural movement (the other four included Richard Rogers, Norman Foster, Nicholas Grimshaw and Terry Farrell).

== Life and career ==
Hopkins was born in 1935 in Poole. His father, Gerald, was a builder and his mother, Barbara, decided at a young age that Hopkins would become an architect. Hopkins attended a public school in Sherborne. He studied architecture at the Bournemouth School of Art and worked with Basil Spence and Frederick Gibberd before, aged 23, enrolling at the Architectural Association in London.

While studying at the Architectural Institute, Hopkins met Patty Wainwright (later Hopkins), who would go on to be his lifelong collaborator. The couple married in 1962.

Hopkins partnered with Norman Foster, where he was the project architect of the Willis Faber headquarters in Ipswich. With Foster, Richard Rogers, Terry Farrell and Nicholas Grimshaw, both Hopkins and his wife were leading figures in the introduction of high-tech architecture into Britain.

In 1976, Hopkins set up what became Hopkins Architects in partnership with his wife, who had run her own practice. One of their first buildings was their own house in Hampstead, a lightweight steel structure with glass façades. Early Hopkins Architects' buildings, such as the Greene King brewery in Bury St Edmunds and the Schlumberger laboratories near Cambridge, used new materials and construction techniques. The firm challenged conventional architectural wisdom by demonstrating that lightweight steel-and-glass structures could be energy efficient and pioneered the use in Britain of permanent lightweight fabric structures, of which the Mound Stand at Lord's Cricket Ground is a notable example.

From the mid-1980s the practice began to explore what they called the "updating of the traditional materials", adding to the expressive potential of traditional crafts like masonry and carpentry by combining them with contemporary engineering. The practice became recognised for its combination of ultra-modern techniques with traditional architecture, broadening their palette of materials and forms.

Together, the Hopkins received the Royal Institute of British Architects Royal Gold Medal, awarded in 1994. The citation describes the Hopkins' work as "not only a matter of exploiting technology to build beautifully, nor simply of accommodating difficult and changing tasks in the most elegant way, but above all of capturing in stone and transmitting in bronze the finest aspirations of our age", praising their contribution to the debate about the "delicate relationship between modernity and tradition" and adding: "For Hopkins, progress is no longer a break with the past but rather an act of continuity where he deftly and intelligently integrates traditional elements such as stone and wood, with advanced and environmentally responsible technology."

== Personal life ==
Patty and Michael's three children, Sarah, Abigail and Joel, grew up in the Hopkins’ open-plan house in Hampstead, though the children later demanded that their bedrooms were given walls. All three children followed their parents into creative/design-based professions: Sarah is project director for the refurbishment of the National Gallery; Abigail became an architect and has a joint practice with her husband; and Joel is a BAFTA-winning film writer/ director. Sarah is married to Sir Alex Younger, a British intelligence officer who served as the Chief of the Secret Intelligence Service (MI6), from 2014 to 2020. Hopkins had 11 grandchildren. Samuel Younger, Grandson of Hopkins and son of Sarah and Alex Younger, died in a motorbike accident at the age of 22.

Hopkins died from vascular dementia on 17 June 2023, aged 88.

== Honours and awards ==
Hopkins’ contribution to architecture was recognised both with appointment as a Commander of the Order of the British Empire (CBE) in the 1989 Birthday Honours, and with a knighthood in the 1995 New Year Honours for Services to Architecture. In 2011 he was awarded the AJ100 Contribution to the Profession award. He was elected a Royal Academician in 1992 and two years later he was jointly awarded the RIBA Gold Medal for Architecture with Patty Hopkins.

== Notable buildings ==
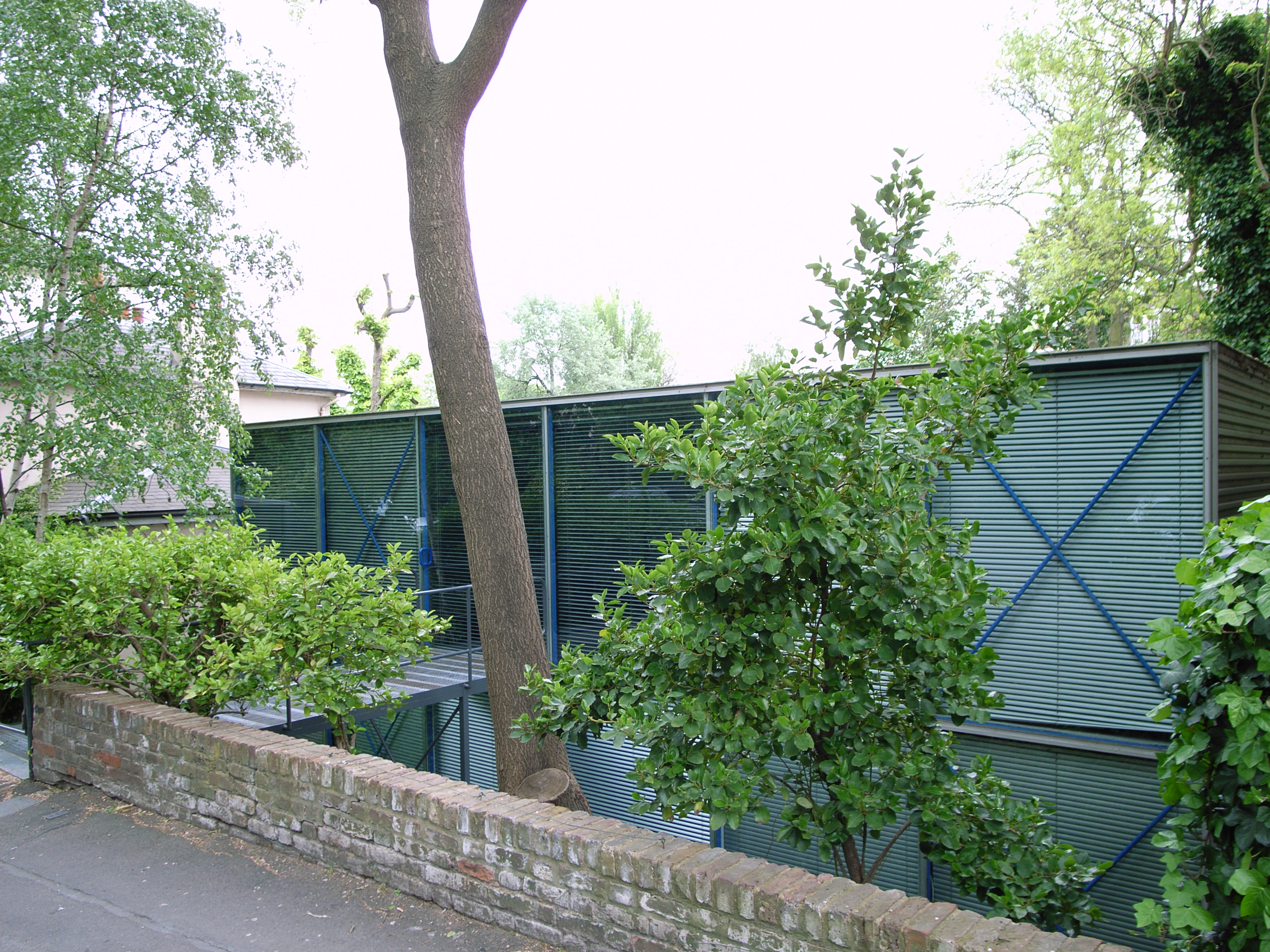
Hopkins House, Hampstead (1976)

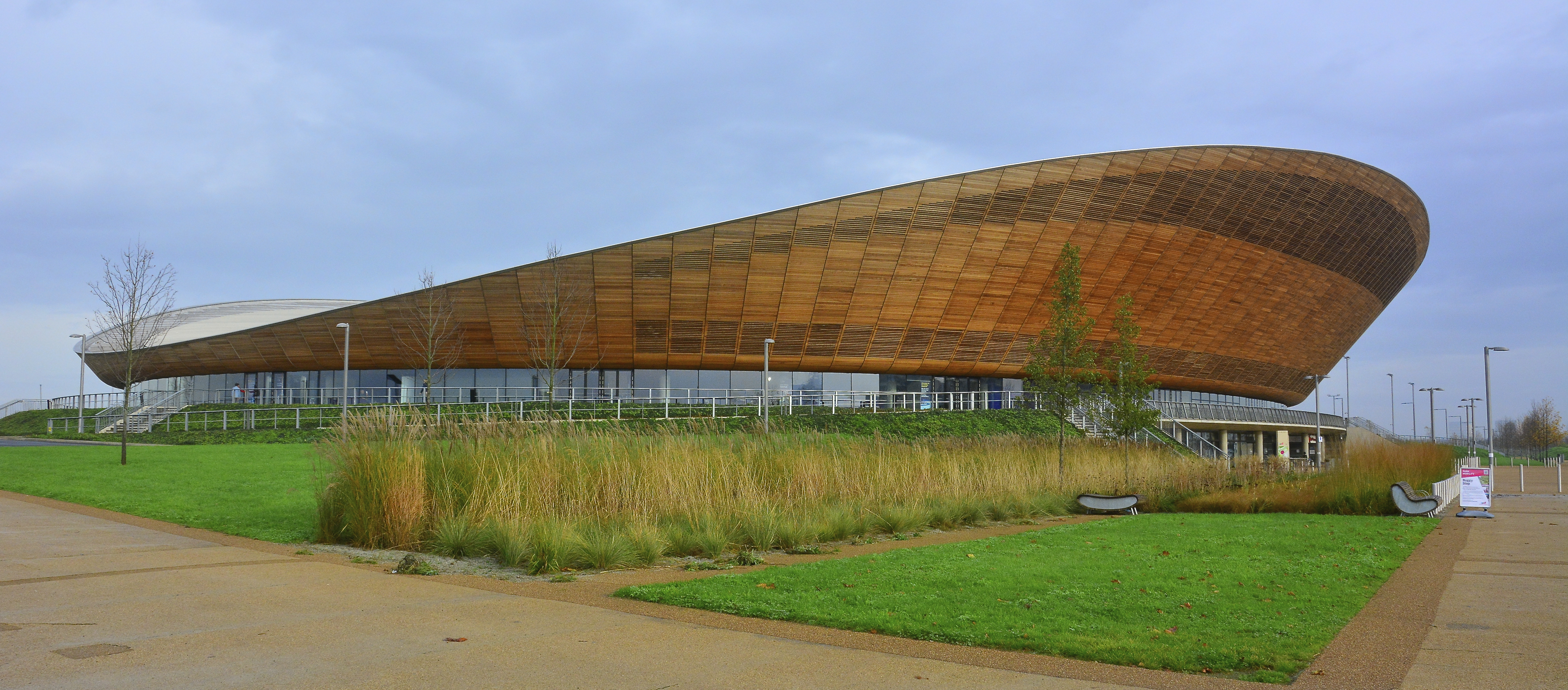
The London 2012 Olympic Velodrome. Stratford, London

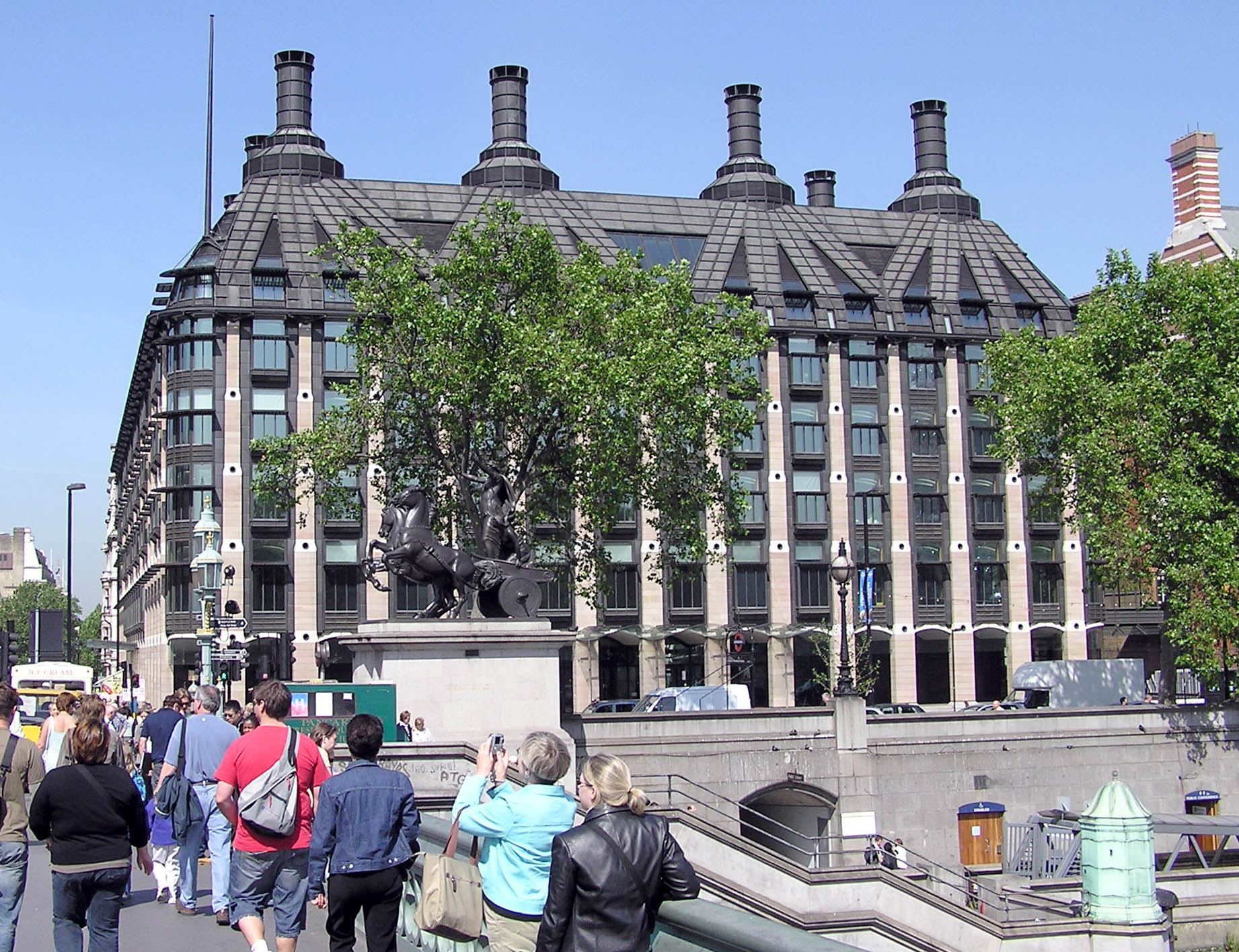
Portcullis House, Westminster, London

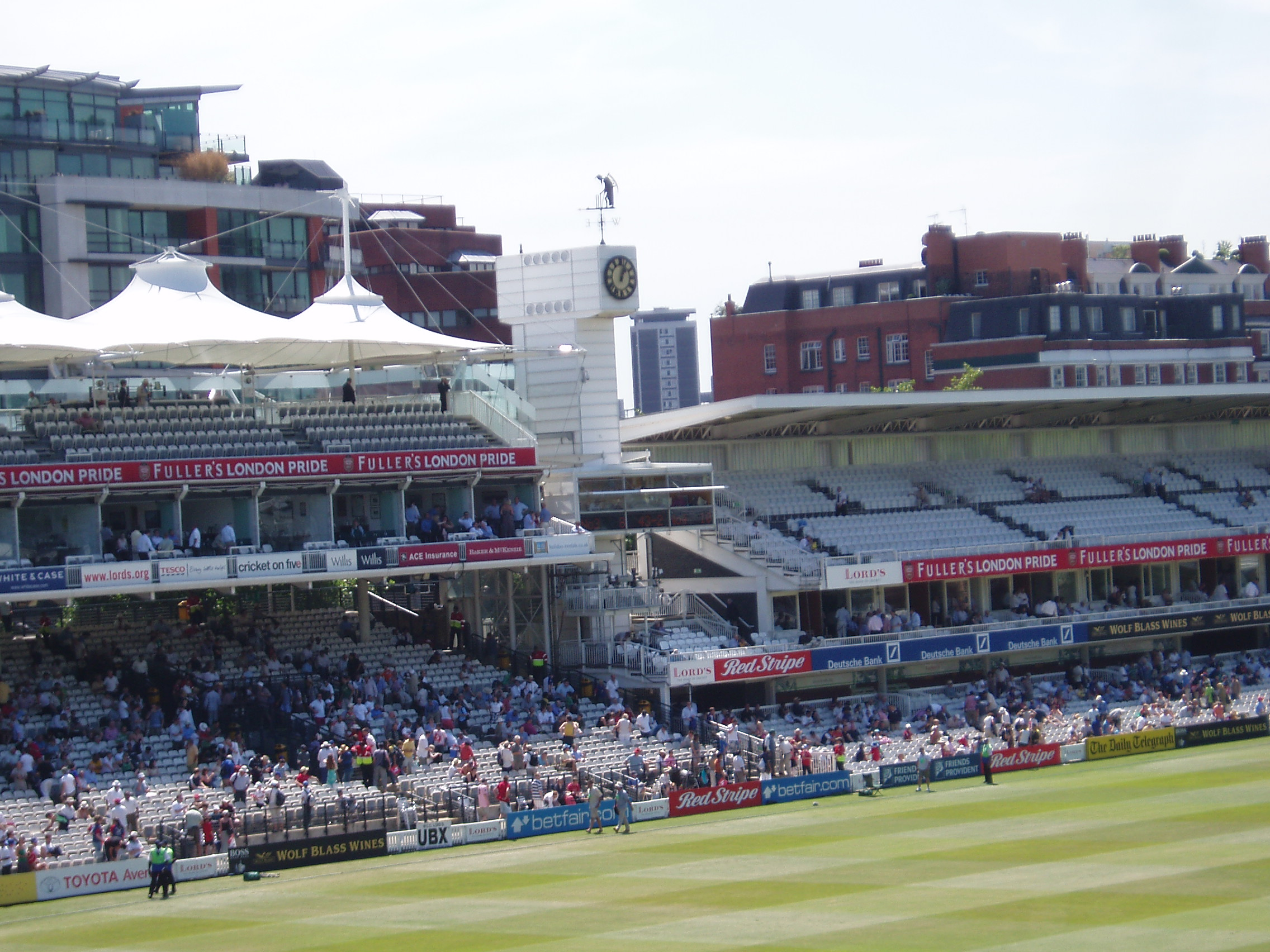
Mound Stand at Lord's Cricket Ground (left)

- Rose Bowl (cricket ground) at Hampshire County Cricket Club
- King's College School Wimbledon, Music School, London, United Kingdom (2018)
- Smith Campus Center, Harvard University, Massachusetts, US (2018)
- Tokyo Midtown Hibiya, Tokyo, Japan
- St Thomas' Hospital East Wing, London, United Kingdom (2015)
- WWF-UK Headquarters, Living Planet Centre, Woking, United Kingdom (2013)
- Maharashtra Cricket Association Stadium, Pune, India (2012)
- University College Hospital Macmillan Cancer Centre, London, United Kingdom (2012)
- London 2012 Velodrome, London, United Kingdom (2011)
- M. A. Chidambaram "Chepauk" Stadium, Chennai, Tamil Nadu, India (2010)
- Rice University: South Colleges & Duncan and McMurtry Colleges, Houston, Texas, USA (2010)
- Princeton University: Frick Chemistry Laboratory, New Jersey, USA (2010)
- Yale University: Kroon Hall, School of Forestry & Environmental Studies, New Haven, Connecticut, USA (2009)
- Dubai International Financial Centre: Gate Village, Dubai, UAE (2008)
- Lawn Tennis Association: National Tennis Centre, Roehampton, United Kingdom (2007)
- Wellcome Trust: Wellcome Collection & Gibbs Building, London, United Kingdom (2007 & 2004)
- Portcullis House, New Parliamentary Building, London, United Kingdom (2001)
- Westminster Underground Station, London, United Kingdom (2001)
- University of Cambridge: Queen's Building, Emmanuel College, Cambridge, United Kingdom (1995)
- Victoria and Albert Museum Masterplan, London, United Kingdom (1993)
- Glyndebourne Opera House, Sussex, United Kingdom (1994)
- Lord's Cricket Ground: Mound Stand, London, United Kingdom (1987)
- Hopkins House, London, United Kingdom (1976)

== Gallery ==
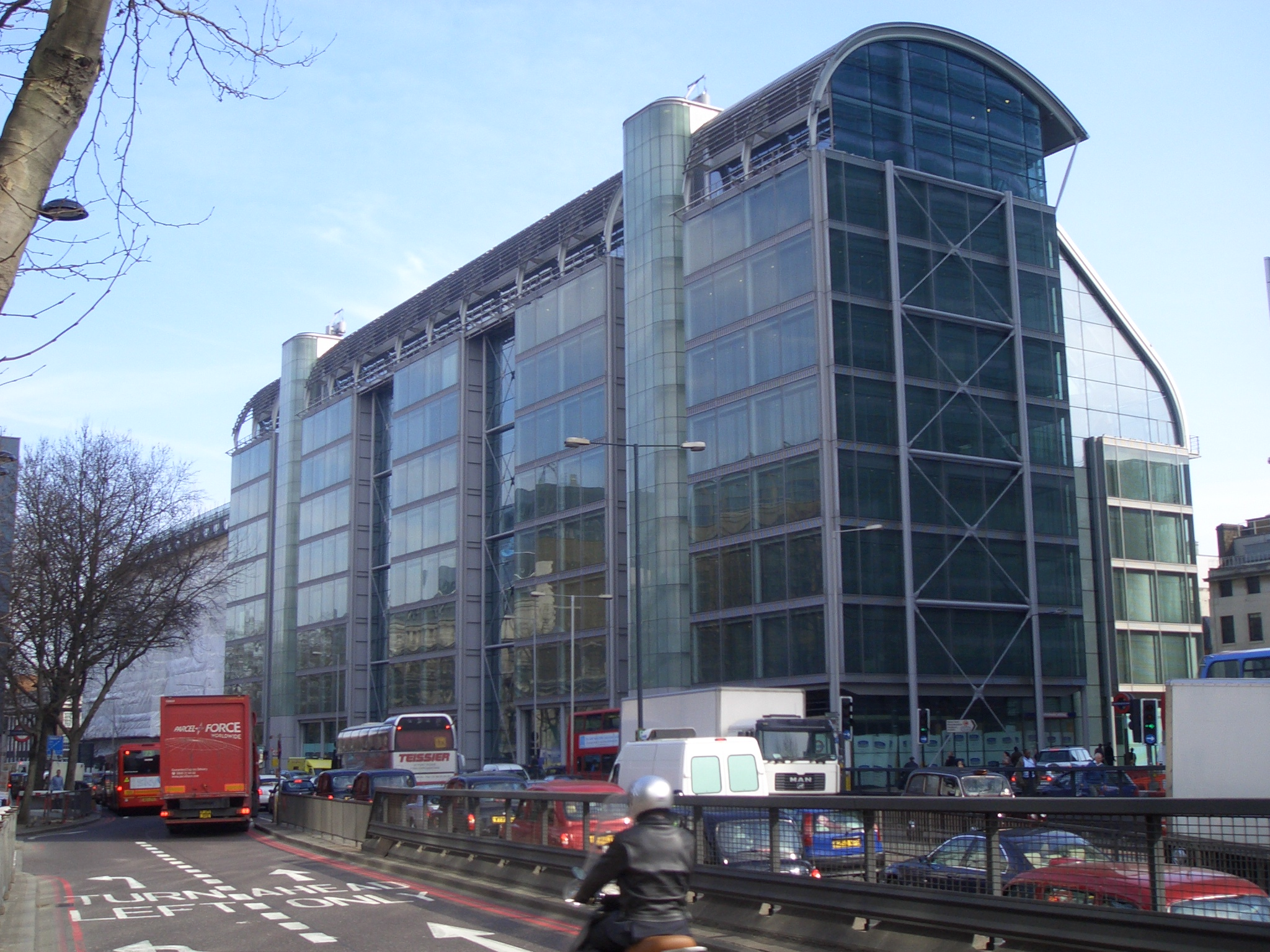
Wellcome Trust building on Euston Road, London

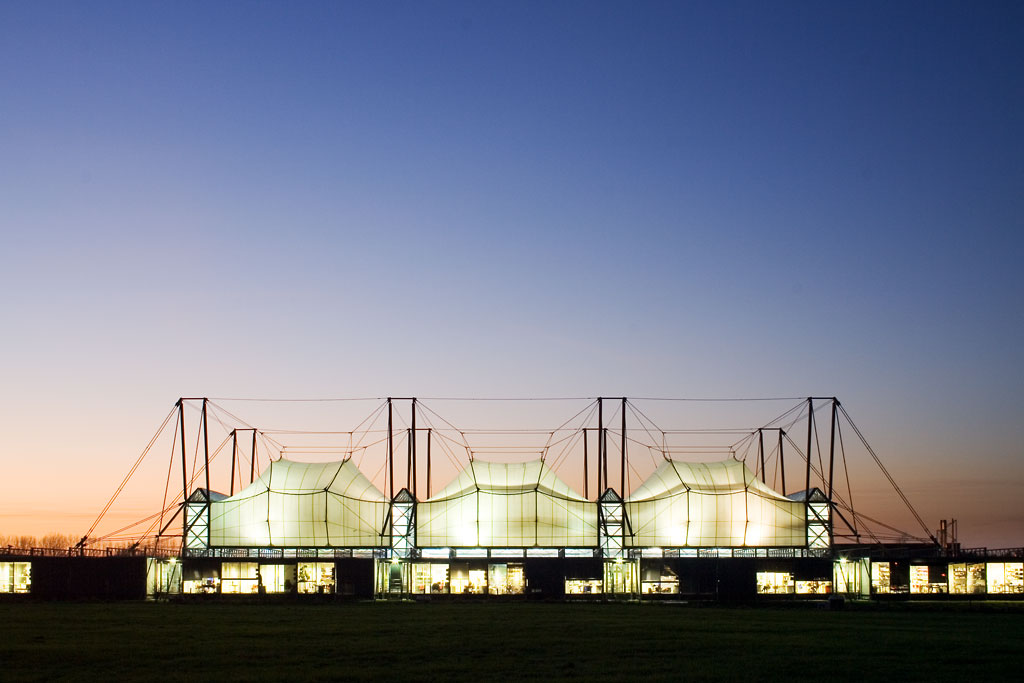
The Schlumberger Cambridge Research Centre, opened in 1985, was one of Hopkins' earliest buildings and shows his distinctive use of a suspended, high-tech, fabric roof.

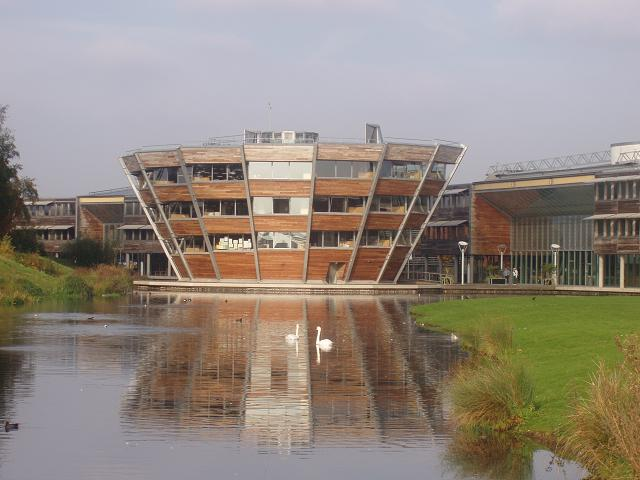
All of the Phase 1 Construction on the University of Nottingham's Jubilee Campus was designed by Hopkins.

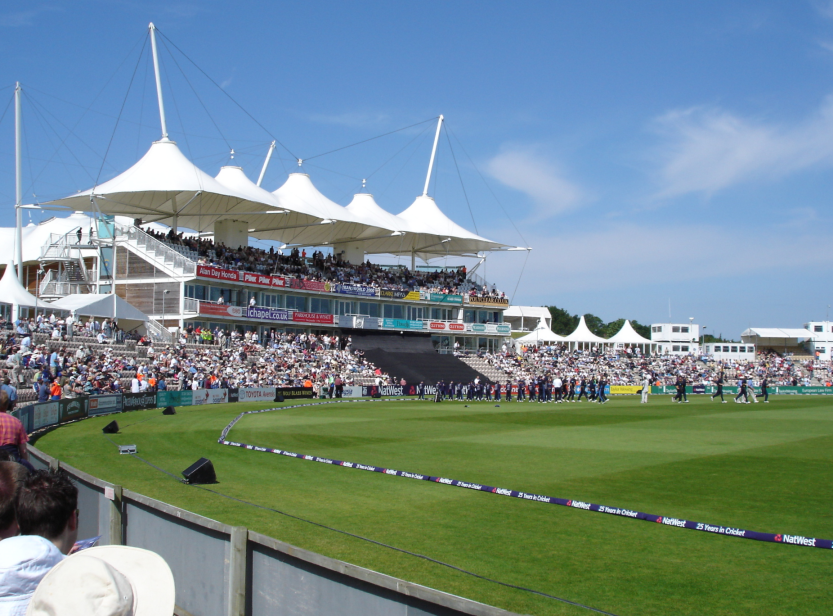
The Rose Bowl, Southampton, showing the pavilion with its distinctive fabric roof

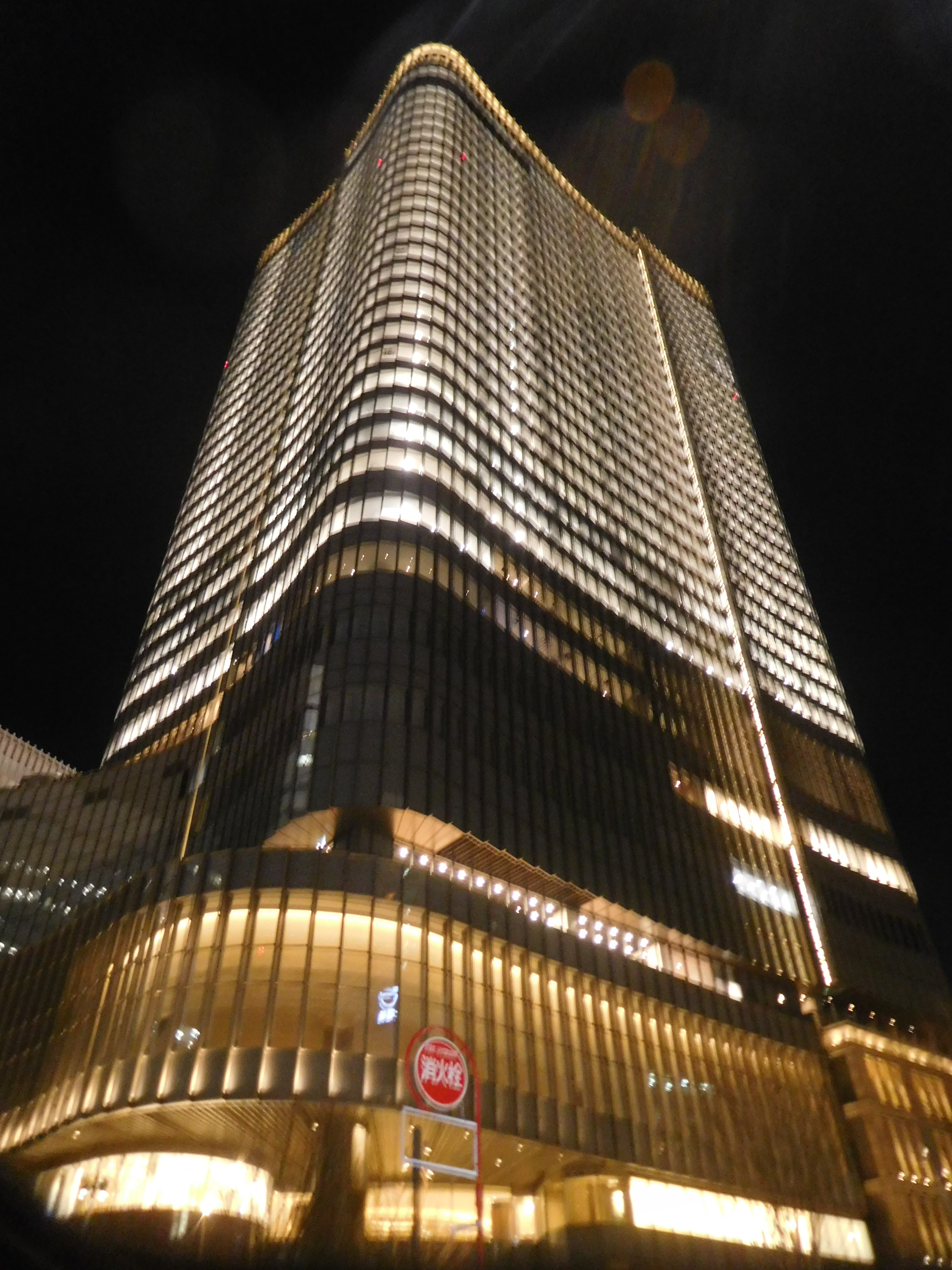
Tokyo Midtown Hibiya, Tokyo

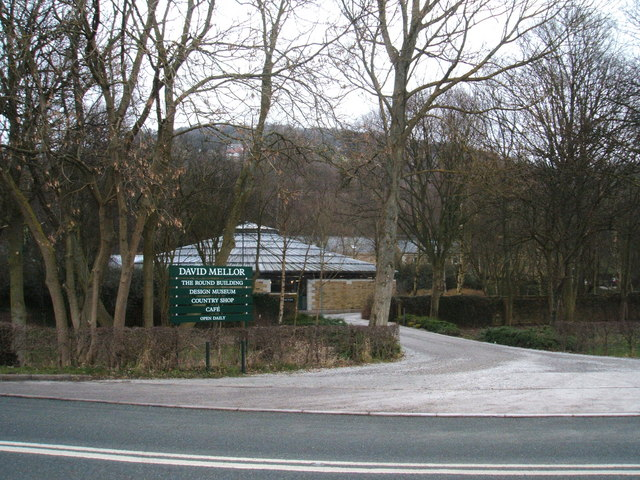
The David Mellor cutlery factory in Hathersage 1990
