= Bill Dunster =

British architect

William Robert Dunster OBE (born 9 July 1960 ) is a British architect.

Prior to forming Zedfactory, Dunster worked for Hopkins Architects for over 14 years specialising in low energy and sustainable development.

While an associate at Hopkins he worked on Nottingham University's Jubilee Campus. As project architect in charge, he took the scheme from the initial competition bid through to completion. Opened in December 1999 by Elizabeth II the campus has since been awarded the RIBA Sustainability Award 2001.

Before Nottingham he developed the environmental strategy and detailed façade design for Portcullis House. This work followed four years of research in the European Union funded Joule Research Project, collaborating with the leading environmental consultants in Europe, including Arup, CSTB Nantes, Christian Bartenbach and Conphoebus.

In 1995 he built his own house, Hope House which is a prototype low energy live/work unit in which he and his family now live. Dunster was educated at the University of Edinburgh and is an honorary graduate of Oxford Brookes University. He has taught at the Architectural Association, Kingston University, Harvard University and EPFL (Switzerland), University of Westminster and University College London.

He founded the architecture practice Zedfactory in 1999. Zedfactory specialise in the field of zero-carbon design and development. Zedfactory's most notable project is bedZED, winner of 2003 Royal Institute of British Architects (RIBA) Sustainability Award,[3] and shortlisted for the 2003 Stirling Prize.

In 2009 Zedfactory won the UK Green Building Council 'Sustainable Development of the Year Award' for projects under £2million, for their RuralZED development in Upton Square, Northampton. This project was also the first commercially available housing development awarded the Code for Sustainable Homes, Level 6.[5]

== Zed Book ==
He co-authored the ‘ZEDbook’ with ecological footprint expert Craig Simmons and building physicist Bobby Gilbert. The book is a manual for achieving zero carbon development at different densities and scales. In 2008 it won the RIBA Research Award.

== Popular Knowledge ==
Dunster was appointed Officer of the Order of the British Empire (OBE) in the 2010 Birthday Honours.
