= National Tennis Centre (United Kingdom) =

Tennis venue in Roehampton, London, England

Coordinates: 51.460°N 0.253°W

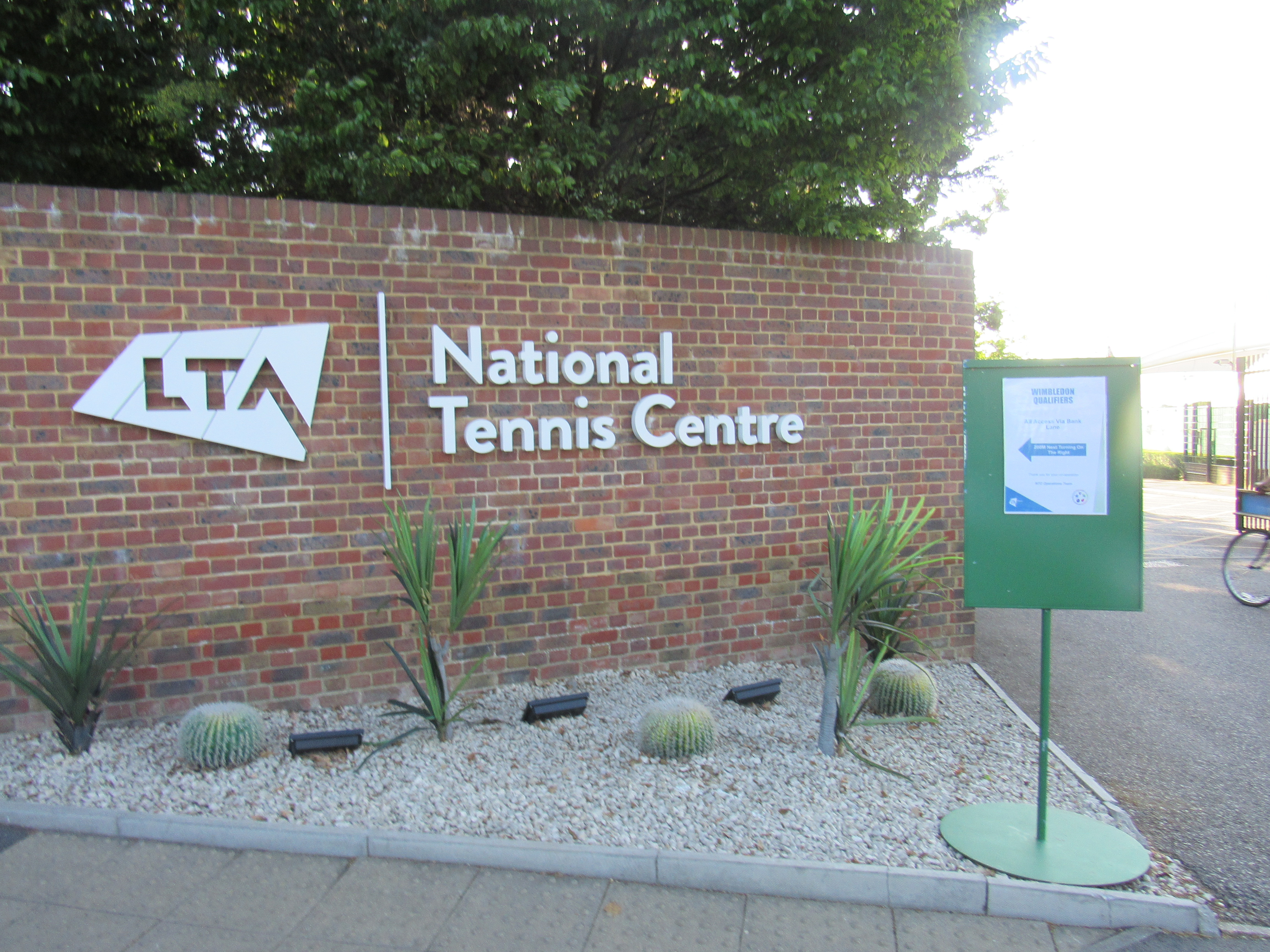
- Established: 2007
- Chief Executive: Scott Lloyd
- Address: 100 Priory Lane, Roehampton; London, SW15
- Location: Roehampton, London, England, United Kingdom

The United Kingdom's National Tennis Centre at Roehampton in south-west London is the high-performance training facility of the Lawn Tennis Association (LTA). It was officially opened by Queen Elizabeth II on 29 March 2007. The Chief Executive of the centre is Scott Lloyd.

The centre has 16 outdoor courts, covering all the Grand Slam surfaces, six indoor courts, a gymnasium and sports science and medical facilities. It also houses the administration of the LTA, which was previously based at the Queen's Club in West Kensington.

== Construction ==
The National Tennis Centre was built in response to a 1999 review by the LTA of the reasons for its sustained failure to produce world class tennis players (the only British players of either sex to make the world top fifty in the 1990s were Tim Henman, who did not come up through the LTA system, and Greg Rusedski, who learned to play in Canada). It was inspired by the national tennis centres in the more successful tennis nations of France, Belgium, Spain, Italy, Switzerland and the United States and serves as a focus for high performance players and coaches.

Previously the LTA's elite training facilities were at Queen's Club, but they were deemed inadequate for the purpose and Queen's is better known as a social club for wealthy Londoners rather than as a centre of sporting excellence. The LTA sold Queen's Club back to the club members. The south-west London location was chosen because it is close to the All England Club, home of the Wimbledon Championships, and many leading British players live in the area.

The National Tennis Centre was designed by Hopkins Architects, the designers of Portcullis House.

The centre was criticised in 2009 for financial waste and for not producing world class tennis players.

The Sport Canopy won a British Construction Industry Awards in 2011.

The centre closed in September 2014. Under the new model overseen by the LTA's chief executive, Michael Downey, the NTC was to remain the administrative headquarters of the organisation, but the elite players were only to use the 22 courts for occasional training camps.
