= Hopkins Architects =

British architectural firm

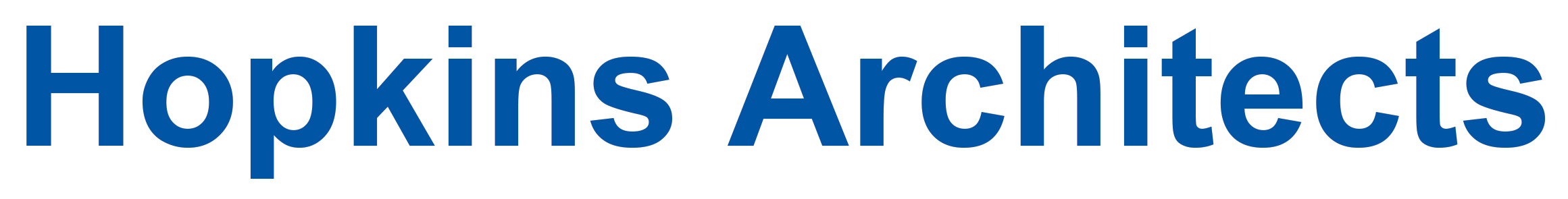

Practice information
- Partners: Michael Hopkins; Patricia Hopkins; James Greaves; Andrew Barnett; Simon Fraser; Michael Taylor; Henry Buxton
- Founded: 1976
- Location: London, Dubai

Website
- www.hopkins.co.uk

Hopkins Architects (formerly Michael Hopkins and Partners) is a prominent British architectural firm established by architects Sir Michael and Patricia, Lady Hopkins.

== Background ==
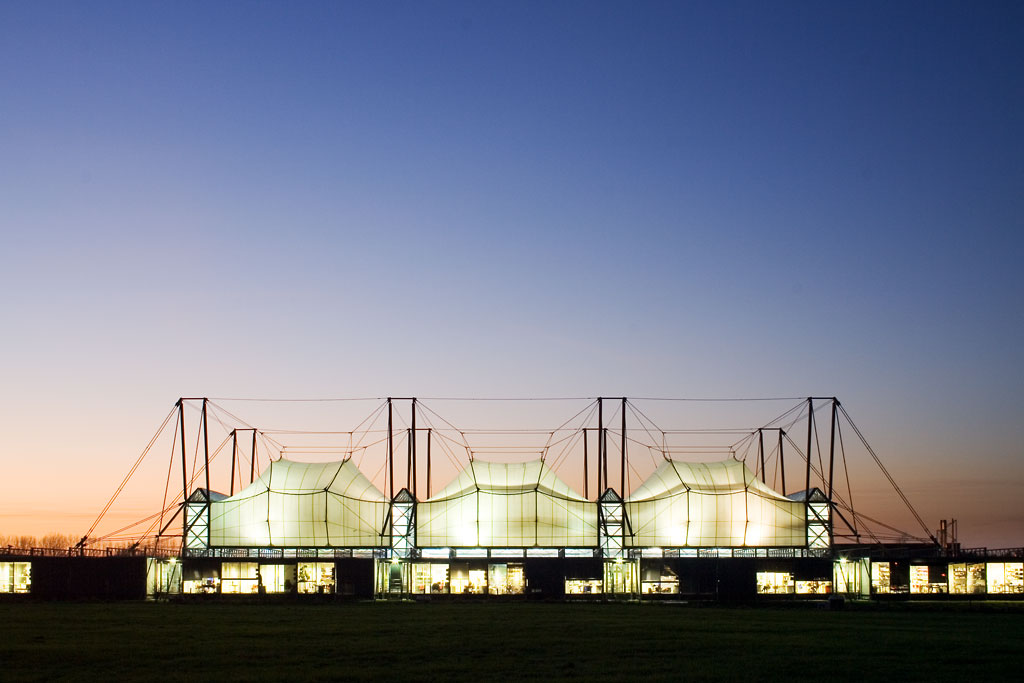
The Schlumberger Cambridge Research Centre, opened in 1985, was one of Hopkins' earliest buildings and shows the Practice's distinctive use of a suspended, high-tech, fabric roof

The practice was established in 1976 by Michael and Patty Hopkins and is now run by five Principals. The practice has won many awards for its work and has been shortlisted for the Stirling Prize three times, including in 2011 for the London 2012 Velodrome, in 2006 for Evelina Children's Hospital and in 2001 for Portcullis House and Westminster Underground Station. The founders were awarded the Royal Institute of British Architects Royal Gold Medal in 1994 and Michael Hopkins was appointed a CBE and knighted for services to architecture.

The practice's first building outside of the United Kingdom was the headquarters for GEK in Athens in 2003, followed by Tokyo's Shin-Marunouchi Tower in 2007. It has now designed buildings on four continents, with projects completed or under development in the UK, the US, Italy, Greece, Turkey, India, Japan, the UAE and Saudi Arabia.

Hopkins maintain their headquarters in Marylebone, London and operate an additional Design Studio in Dubai. In addition, they operate Project Offices in Munich, Shanghai and Tokyo.

Current work includes the new Harold Alfond Athletics and Recreation Center at Colby College in Maine, USA, and the Peninsula London Hotel.

In July 2022, 100 Liverpool Street, a mixed use development for British Land in the City of London, was shortlisted for the Stirling Prize.

== Notable buildings ==
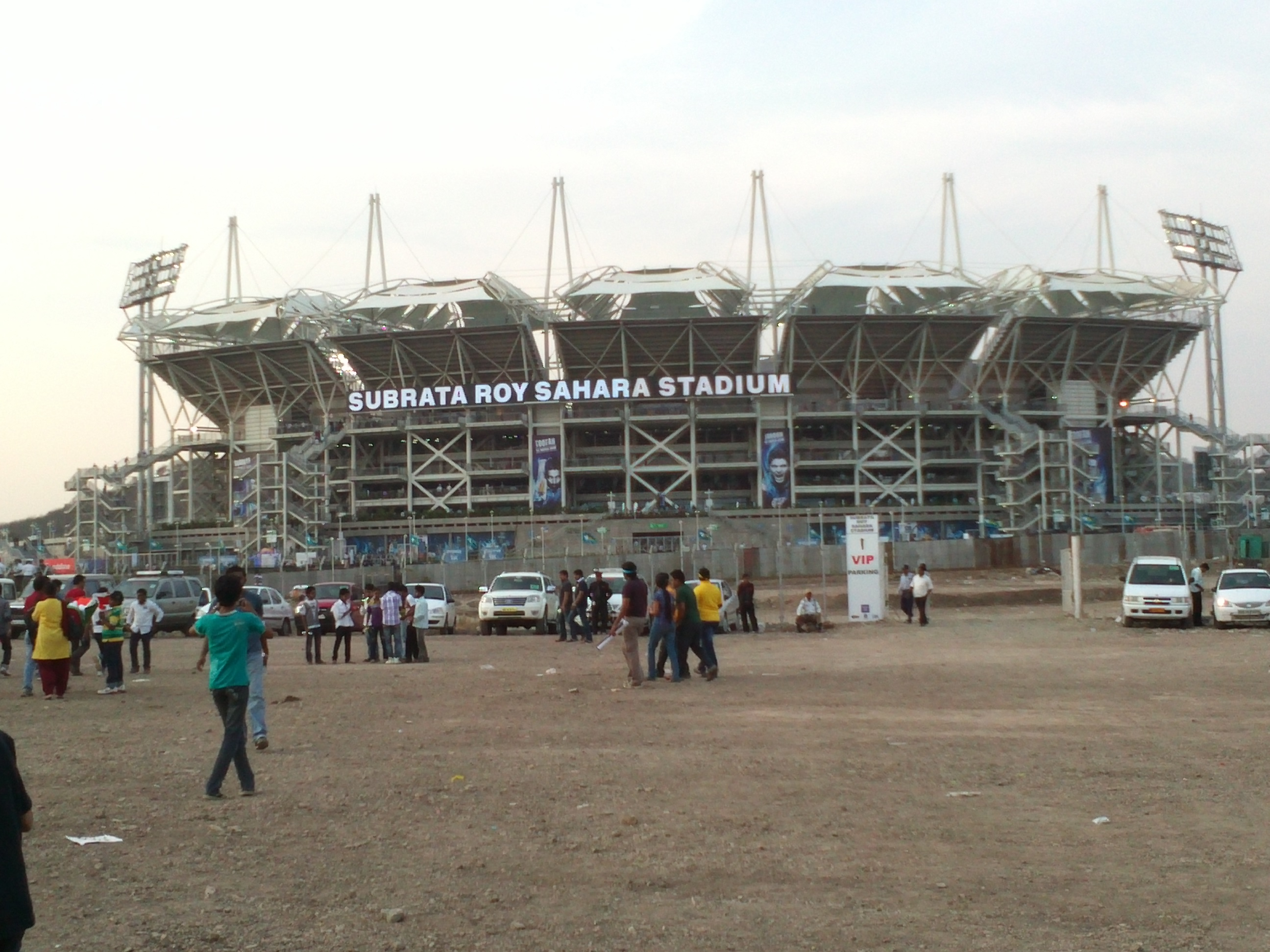
Maharashtra Cricket Association Stadium at Gahunje, the home ground of Pune Warriors India from 2012–2013

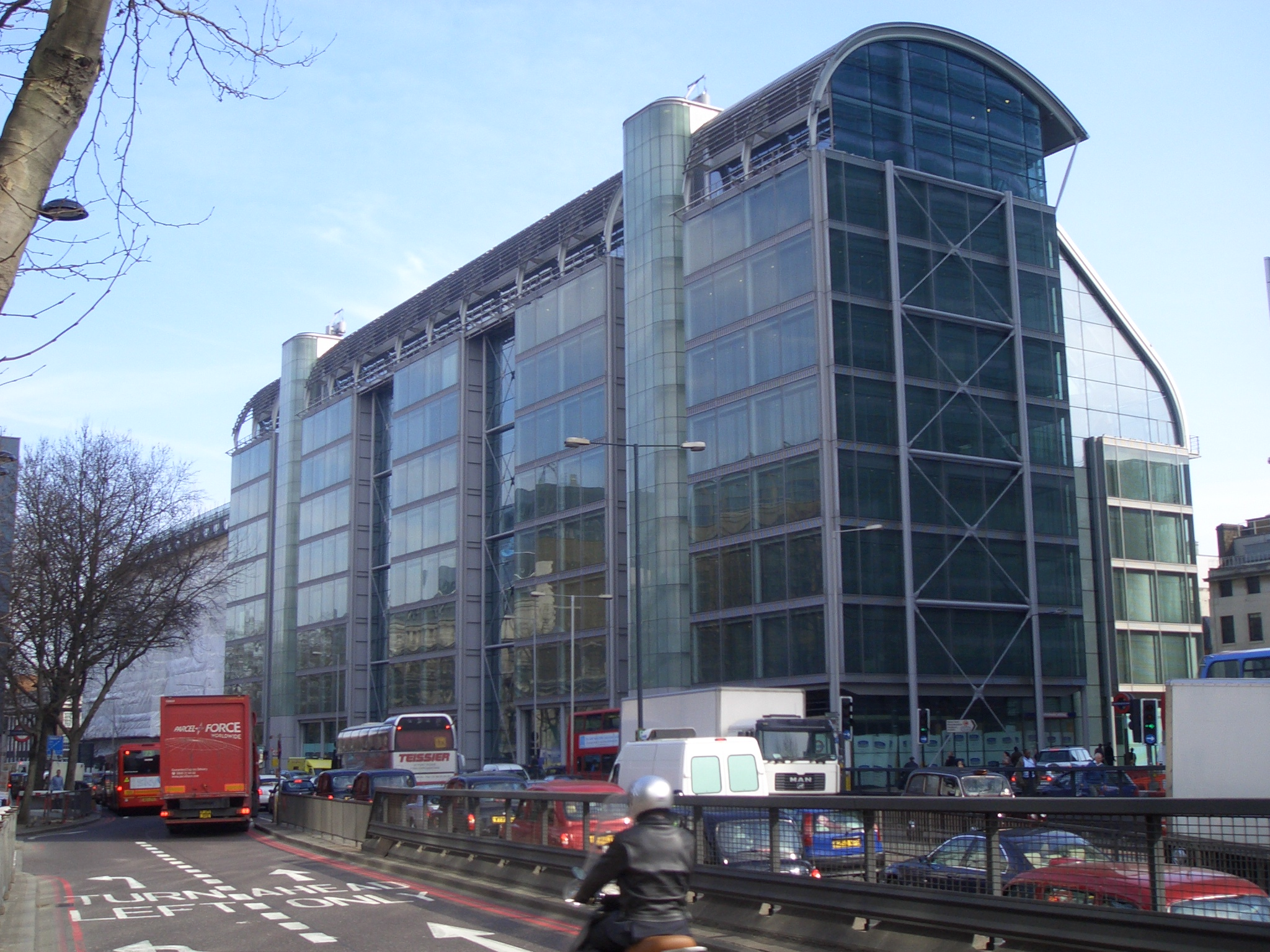
Wellcome Trust building, London

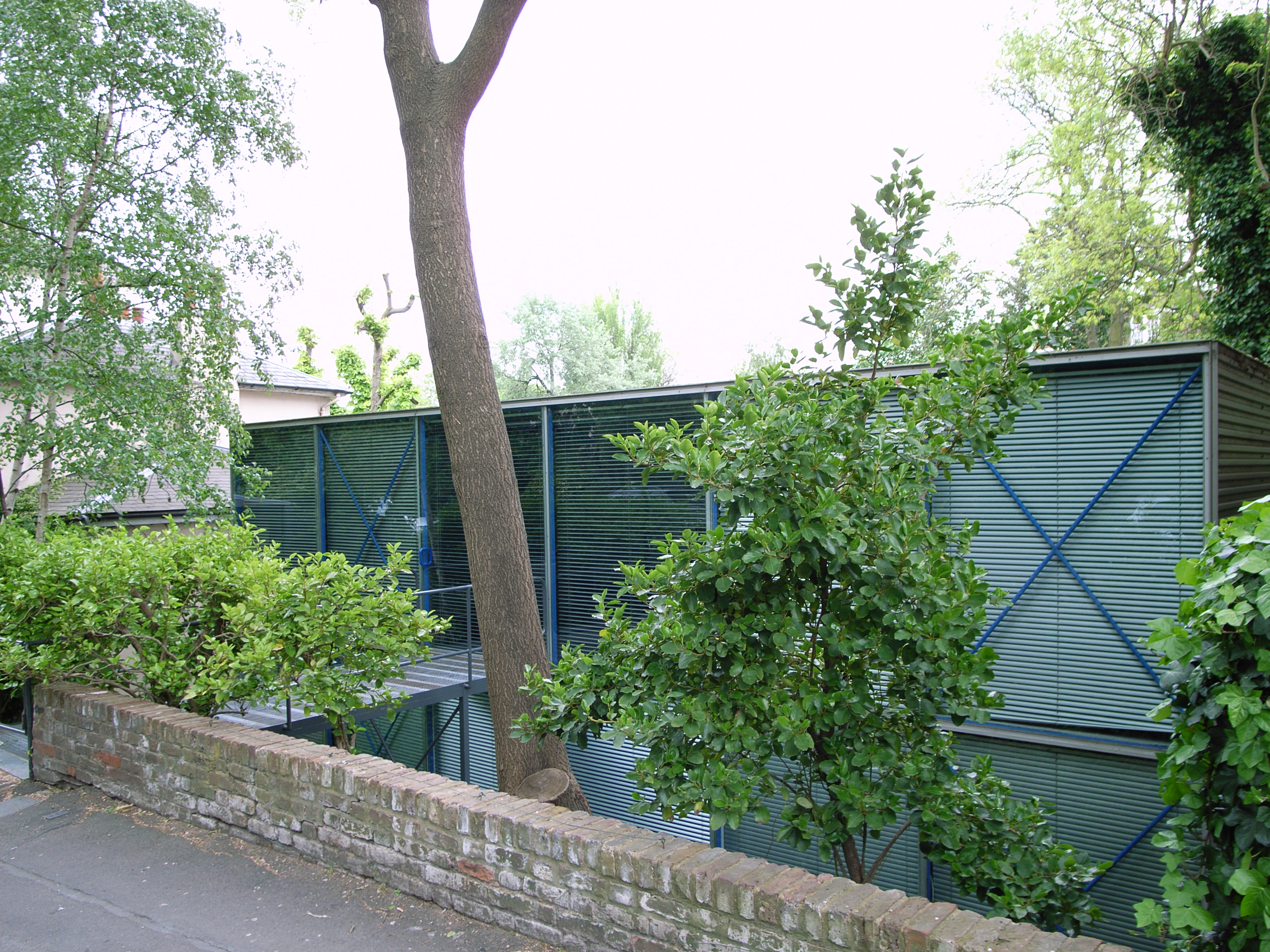
Hopkins House, Hampstead (1976)

- Stephen A. Schwarzman Centre for the Humanities, Oxford, United Kingdom (2025)
- Music School, King's College School Wimbledon, London, United Kingdom (2018)
- Smith Campus Center, Harvard University, Massachusetts, US (2018)
- Alder Hey Children's Hospital: Institute in the Park, Liverpool, United Kingdom (2018)
- Tokyo Midtown Hibiya, Tokyo, Japan
- St Thomas' Hospital East Wing, London, United Kingdom (2015)
- Bryanston School: The Tom Wheare Music School, Dorset, United Kingdom (2014)
- Brent Civic Centre, London, United Kingdom (2013)
- WWF-UK Headquarters, Living Planet Centre, Woking, United Kingdom (2013)
- University of East London: Stratford Library, London, United Kingdom (2013)
- St George's Chapel, Great Yarmouth, United Kingdom (2012)
- Maharashtra Cricket Association Stadium, Pune, India (2012)
- University College Hospital Macmillan Cancer Centre, London, United Kingdom (2012)
- London 2012 Velodrome, London, United Kingdom (2011)
- Rice University: South Colleges, Houston, Texas, USA (2010)
- Rice University: Duncan and McMurtry Colleges, Houston, Texas, USA (2010)
- Princeton University: Frick Chemistry Laboratory, New Jersey, USA (2010)
- M. A. Chidambaram "Chepauk" Stadium, Chennai, Tamil Nadu, India (2010)
- Norwich Cathedral Hostry, Norwich, United Kingdom (2009)
- Nottingham Trent University: Newton and Arkwright Buildings, Nottingham, United Kingdom (2009)
- Yale University: Kroon Hall, School of Forestry & Environmental Studies, New Haven, Connecticut, USA (2009)
- Dubai International Financial Centre: Gate Village, Dubai, UAE (2008)
- Lawn Tennis Association: National Tennis Centre, Roehampton, United Kingdom (2007)
- Wellcome Trust: Wellcome Collection, London, United Kingdom (2007)
- Evelina Children's Hospital, London, United Kingdom (2006)
- Wellcome Trust: Gibbs Building, London, United Kingdom (2004)
- Norwich Cathedral Refectory, Norwich, United Kingdom (2004)
- Portcullis House, New Parliamentary Building, London, United Kingdom (2001)
- Westminster Underground Station, London, United Kingdom (2001)
- The Forum, Norwich, United Kingdom (2001)
- University of Nottingham: Jubilee Campus, Nottingham, United Kingdom (1999)
- Our Dynamic Earth, Edinburgh, United Kingdom (1999)
- University of Cambridge: Queen's Building, Emmanuel College, Cambridge, United Kingdom (1995)
- Victoria and Albert Museum Masterplan, London, United Kingdom (1993)
- Inland Revenue Centre, Nottingham, United Kingdom (1994)
- Glyndebourne Opera House, Sussex, United Kingdom (1994)
- Bracken House, London, United Kingdom (1992)
- Lord's Cricket Ground: Mound Stand, London, United Kingdom (1987)
- Schlumberger Research Centre, Cambridge, United Kingdom (1982 – 1985)
- Hopkins House, London, United Kingdom (1976)
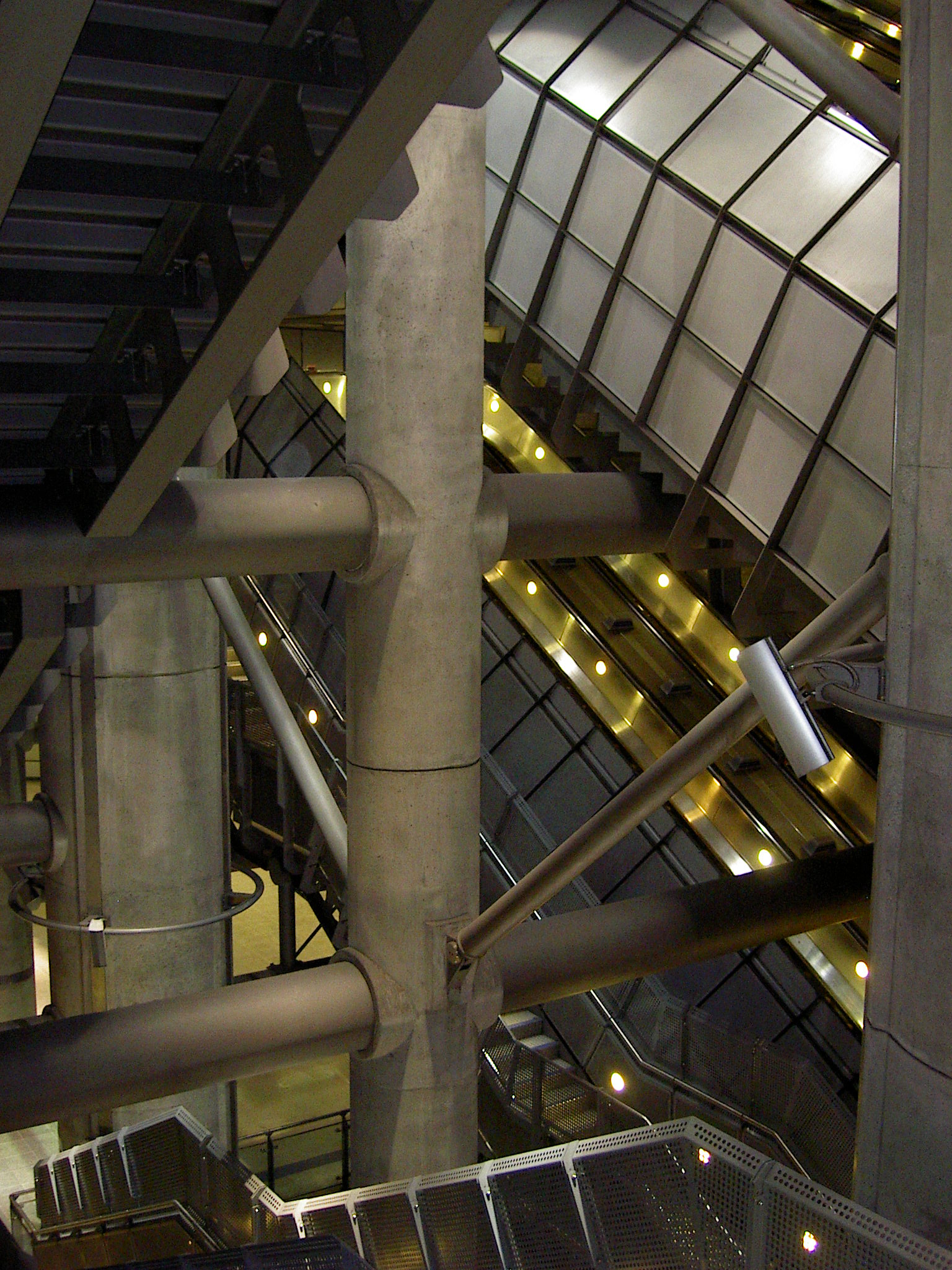
Westminster Underground Station, London

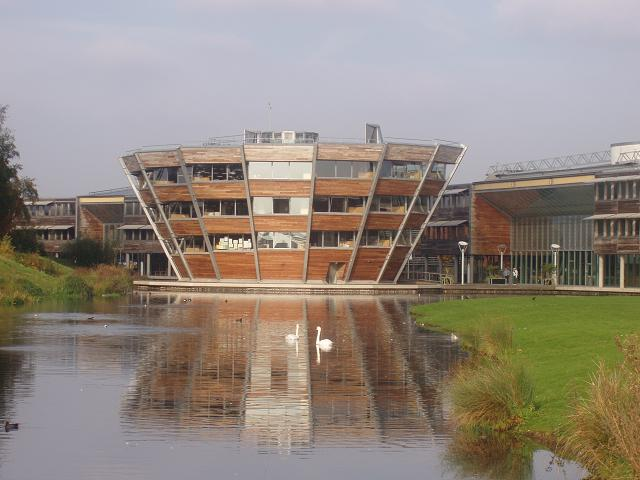
University of Nottingham: Jubilee Campus

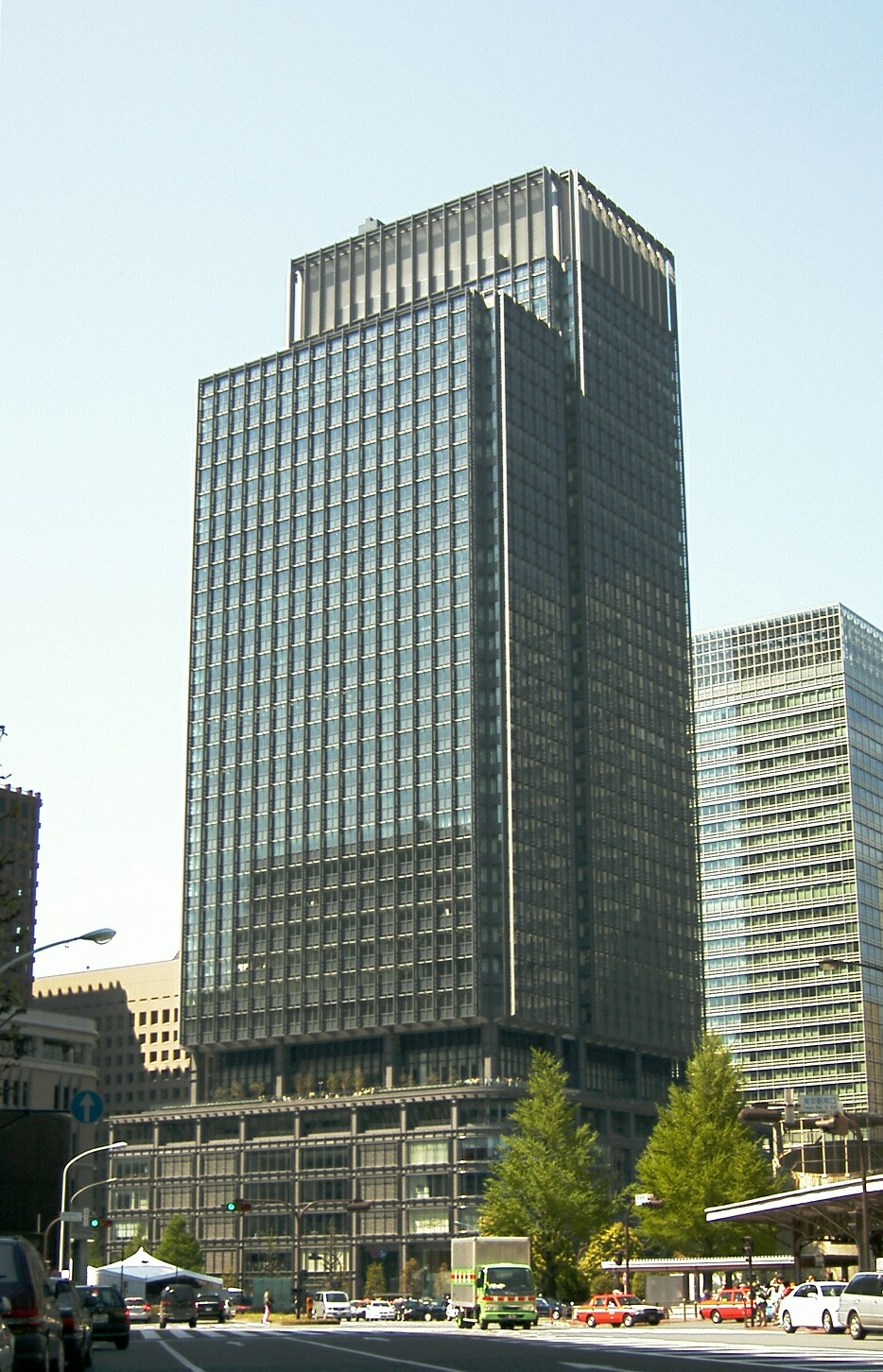
Shin-Marunouchi Building, Tokyo

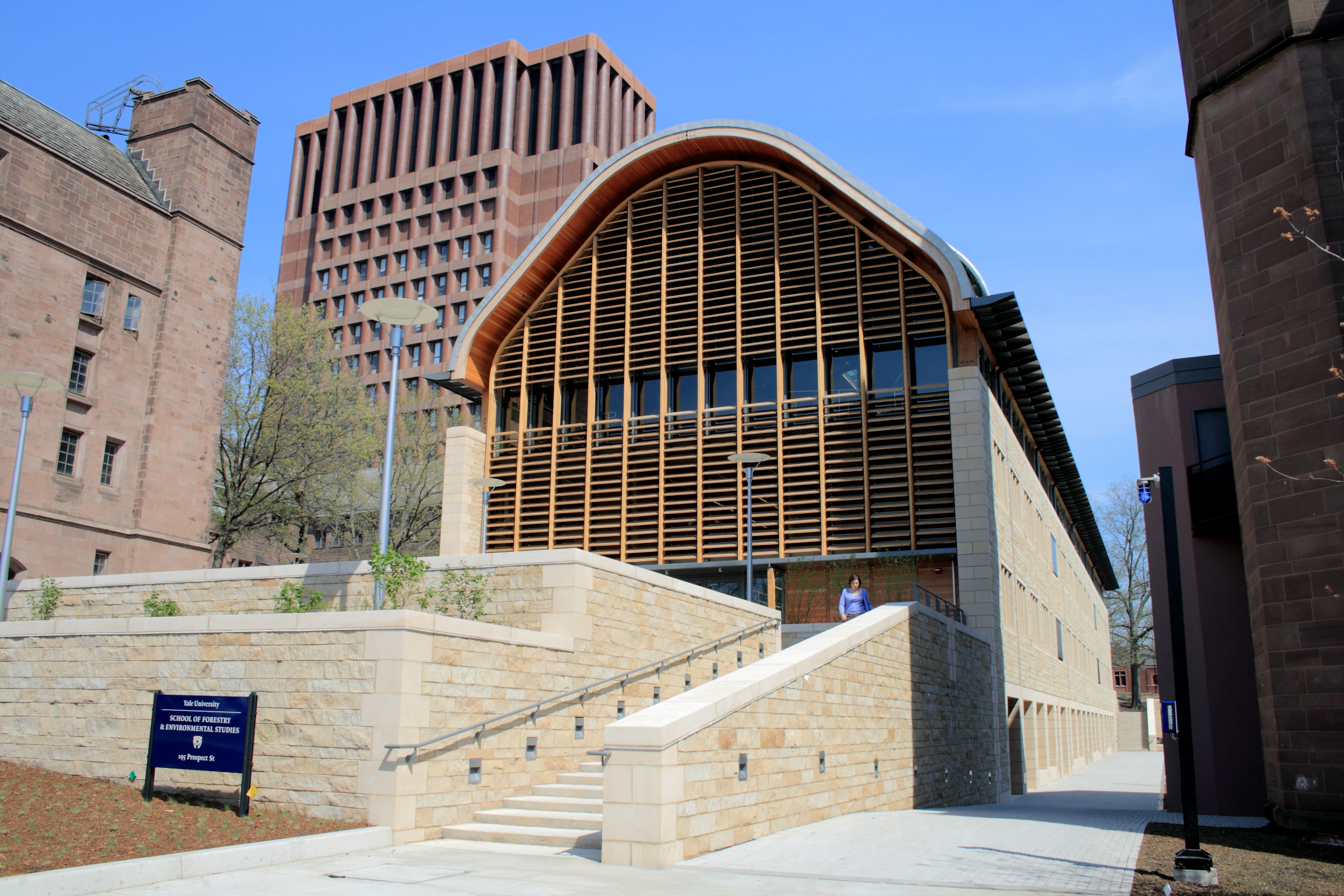
Yale University: Kroon Hall, School of Forestry & Environmental Studies, New Haven

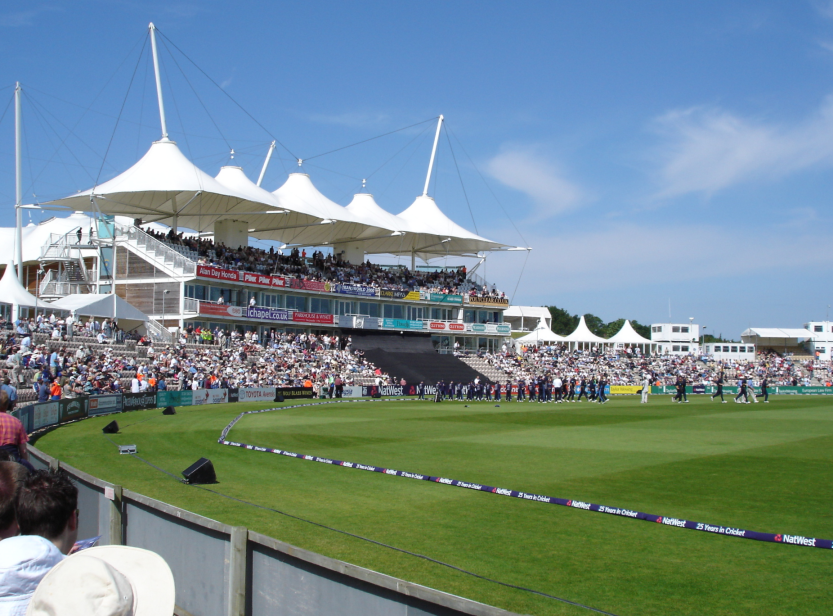
Hampshire County Cricket Club, Southampton

== Former collaborators ==
Former Hopkins staff include Chris Wilkinson, Bill Dunster, and John Pringle and Ian Sharratt (who went on to set up Pringle Richards Sharratt)

== Appearances ==
Buildings by Hopkins appear in two James Bond films. The interior of the IBM Building at Bedfont Lakes serves as the location for Elliot Carver's media party in Hamburg in Tomorrow Never Dies. In the following film, The World Is Not Enough, Portcullis House makes a fleeting appearance in the boat chase down the Thames.

On 22 October 2006, the practice's Westminster Underground Station was closed for the day to allow filming for Harry Potter and the Order of the Phoenix to take place for a scene where Harry takes the tube with Arthur Weasley to go to a disciplinary hearing at the Ministry of Magic.

As one of the main venues during the 2012 Summer Olympics in London, the interior and exterior of the 2012 London Velodrome featured prominently during track cycling events on many major networks throughout the world.
