= Hopkins House, Hampstead =

High-tech home in Hampstead, London, England

Coordinates: 51°33′19″N 0°10′14″W

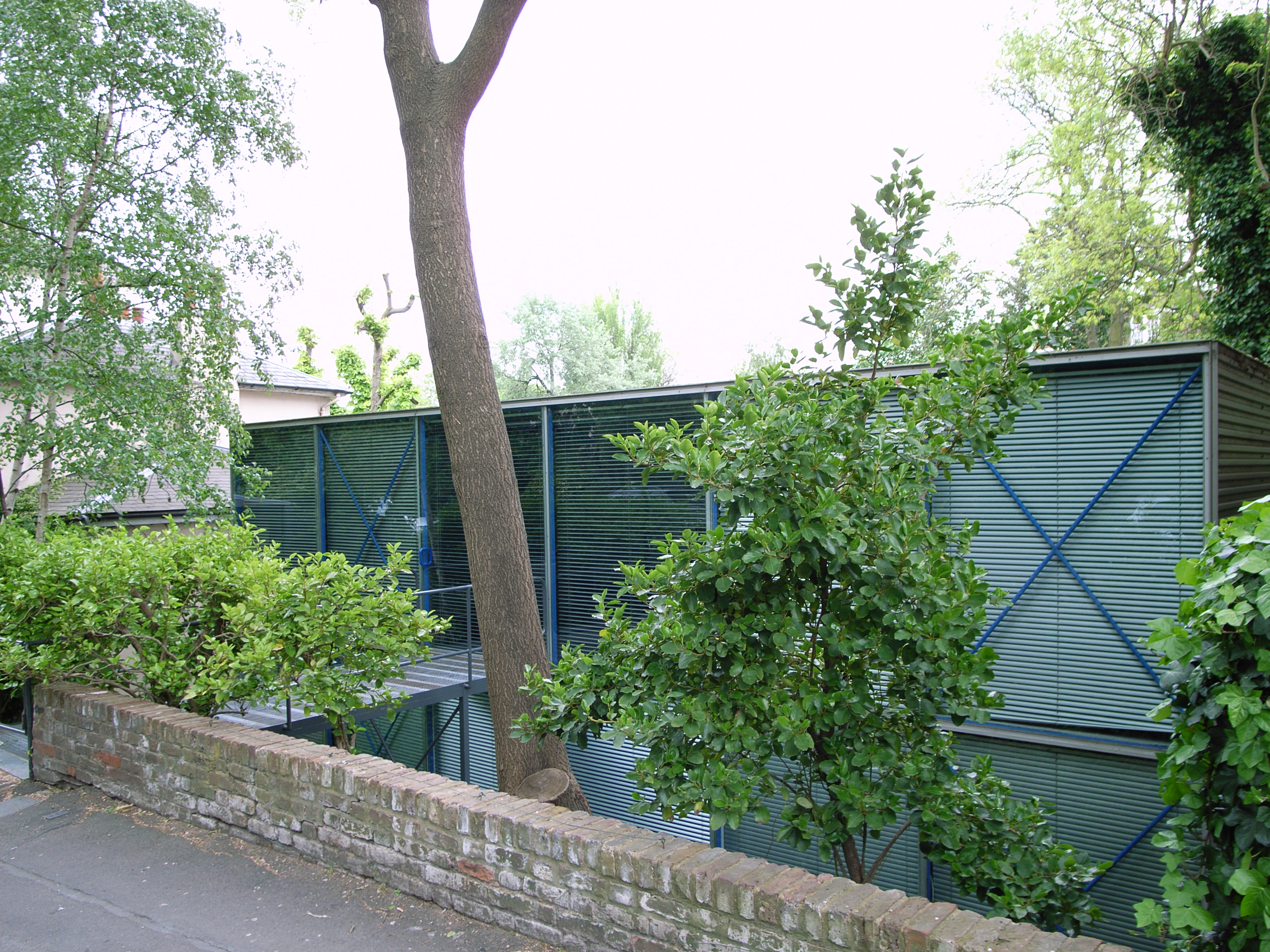
Hopkins House, Hampstead (1976)

The Hopkins House at 49a Downshire Hill is the common name given to the high-tech home and workspace in Hampstead, London (1976), designed by architects Michael and Patty Hopkins. It has been described as a "genuine icon of the High Tech movement". The house won a RIBA Award for Architecture in 1977 and a Civic Trust Award in 1979.

== History and description ==
Though the house has no formal name (simply a street number 49a) it was the first project of Michael and Patty Hopkins' architecture practice, Michael Hopkins and Partners (now Hopkins Architects), founded in 1976. It remains their "calling card" over 40 years later. The couple believed at the time architecture would soon combine with engineering and increasingly favour prefabricated, ultra-lightweight construction. Design of the slender post and beam structure is attributed to Anthony Hunt, who worked closely with the British High Tech Architects during the 1970s and early 1980s.

The building was designed as "a machine for both living and working in". It was a simple two-storey glass and steel box, with few permanent interior partitions, only occasional plastic panels for privacy of the bathrooms and sleeping areas. The steel frame structure is left clearly visible. Patty Hopkins describes the technique as "really very basic 16th-century engineering", though replacing crafted timber joints with sophisticated metal joints, rods, and tension cables. The house is reached from the street by a 'drawbridge' entering at the first floor level. As such, the house appears to be only one floor in height from the street. It easily gained planning permission because the site was already expected to have a much larger four-storey building developed at that spot. The couple paid £30,000 for the site and a further £20,000 to complete the construction.

The house was used as the offices of Michael Hopkins and Partners for the next eight years (until the practice outgrew the space and moved to Marylebone). It served as an advertisement for the company's work and clients would be keen to visit. The Hopkins family also lived in the building and their three children grew up there. Defying convention, there was nothing to physically distinguish the work space from the living areas, other than the fact the family generally stayed on the ground floor and the work was carried out above. All the same, Patty Hopkins recalled having to hide the bed to make the work area look more professional. She also found it easier to reinforce the children's behavioural boundaries when business was regularly being conducted nearby.

The couple continued to use the house as their London home. The Hopkins House was designated a Grade II* listed building in 2018.
