= Patty Hopkins =

English architect

Patty Hopkins OBE
- Born: Patricia Ann Wainwright; 1942 (age 83–84); Stoke on Trent, Staffordshire, England
- Education: Architectural Association
- Occupation: Architect
- Spouse: Sir Michael Hopkins
- Awards: Royal Gold Medal for Architecture
- Practice: Hopkins Architects

Patricia Ann Hopkins, Lady Hopkins, OBE (née Wainwright; born 1942), is an English architect and joint winner, along with her husband Sir Michael Hopkins, of the 1994 Royal Gold Medal for Architecture.

== Early life ==
Hopkins was born in Stoke on Trent, Staffordshire, to Shelagh (née Barry, 1909–2003) and Denys Wainwight (1908–2008). Both parents were doctors, and on her father's side her grandfather was an architect and grandmother a general practitioner.

Hopkins was educated at Wycombe Abbey boarding school in Buckinghamshire. After considering a career in science, she opted to take the entrance exam to enrol at London's Architectural Association, in 1959 becoming one of five women out of 60 students. At age 20 she married fellow AA student, Michael Hopkins, after which they lived in Suffolk until 1970 before moving to North London.

== Career ==
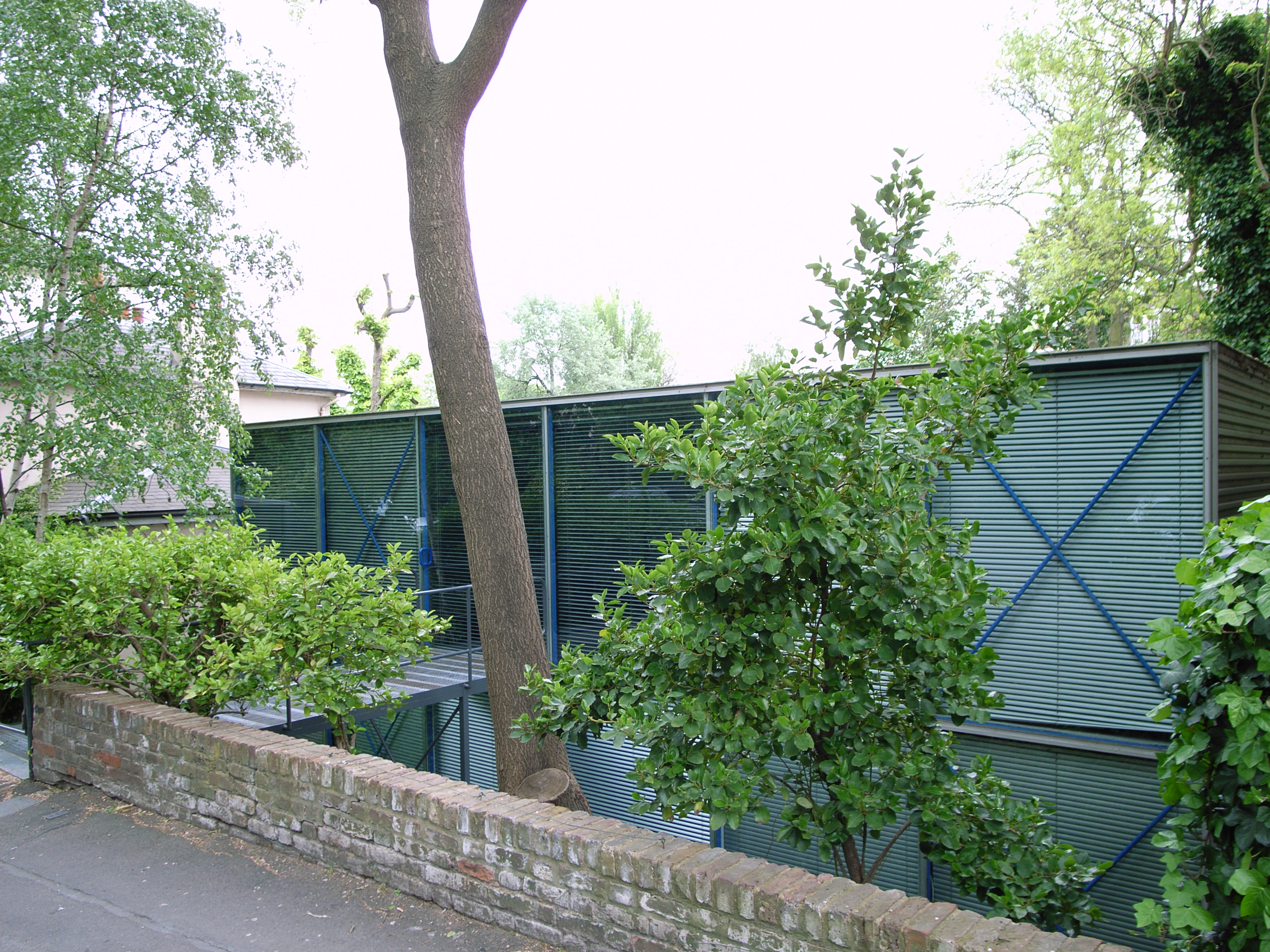
Hopkins House, Hampstead (1976)

After graduating from the Architectural Association, Hopkins set up her own practice.

In 1976 she set up an architectural practice Hopkins Architects with her husband. Notable is the couple's own home, which they built themselves (1976) in Hampstead, London, to be used as a flexible live-work space, an office for their business for the next eight years and a home for themselves and their three children. The house had transparent glass walls and an exposed steel frame with a lack of internal walls. Together they continued to create buildings using innovative new materials, for example using lightweight fabric for the Mound Stand at Lord's Cricket Ground (1987).

In 1994 Patty and Michael Hopkins were jointly awarded the Royal Institute of British Architects (RIBA) Royal Gold Medal for Architecture, with the medal citation saying "What best characterises the work of Michael and Patricia Hopkins is an equal appeal to ordinary people and to architects." Patty Hopkins had a major role in the new Glyndebourne Opera House project, completed the same year.

She became an honorary fellow of the Royal Institute of Architects in Scotland (RIAS) in 1996 and of the American Institute of Architects (AIA) in 1997. She gave the keynote speech to the Women in Architecture luncheon at the Langham Hotel in 2014.

On her work as a woman architect Hopkins said in 2011 "When I was younger, older men would be rather patronising. You still find certain clients uncomfortable with women architects, but I can't say it exercises me. I'm not a feminist. I'm an architect, trying to concentrate on my work."

Hopkins was appointed Officer of the Order of the British Empire (OBE) in the 2024 New Year Honours for services to architecture.

== 2014 incident ==
In 2014 the BBC was criticised when it allegedly removed Patty Hopkins from a photograph used as an illustration in the third programme of the BBC's series The Brits Who Built the Modern World. The series focused on the five male architects, Norman Foster, Richard Rogers, Nicholas Grimshaw, Terry Farrell and Michael Hopkins, her husband. The criticism focused on the fact that Hopkins was a full partner in the Hopkins firm alongside her husband. The BBC were accused of ignoring women architects, though the BBC responded by saying they had met with Patty Hopkins to agree on her level of involvement. The photo had been edited by the photographer. All six architects were the subject of the associated RIBA exhibition, also called The Brits Who Built the Modern World.
