= Tokyo Midtown Hibiya =

Skyscraper in Japan

Coordinates: 35.6737°N 139.7592°E

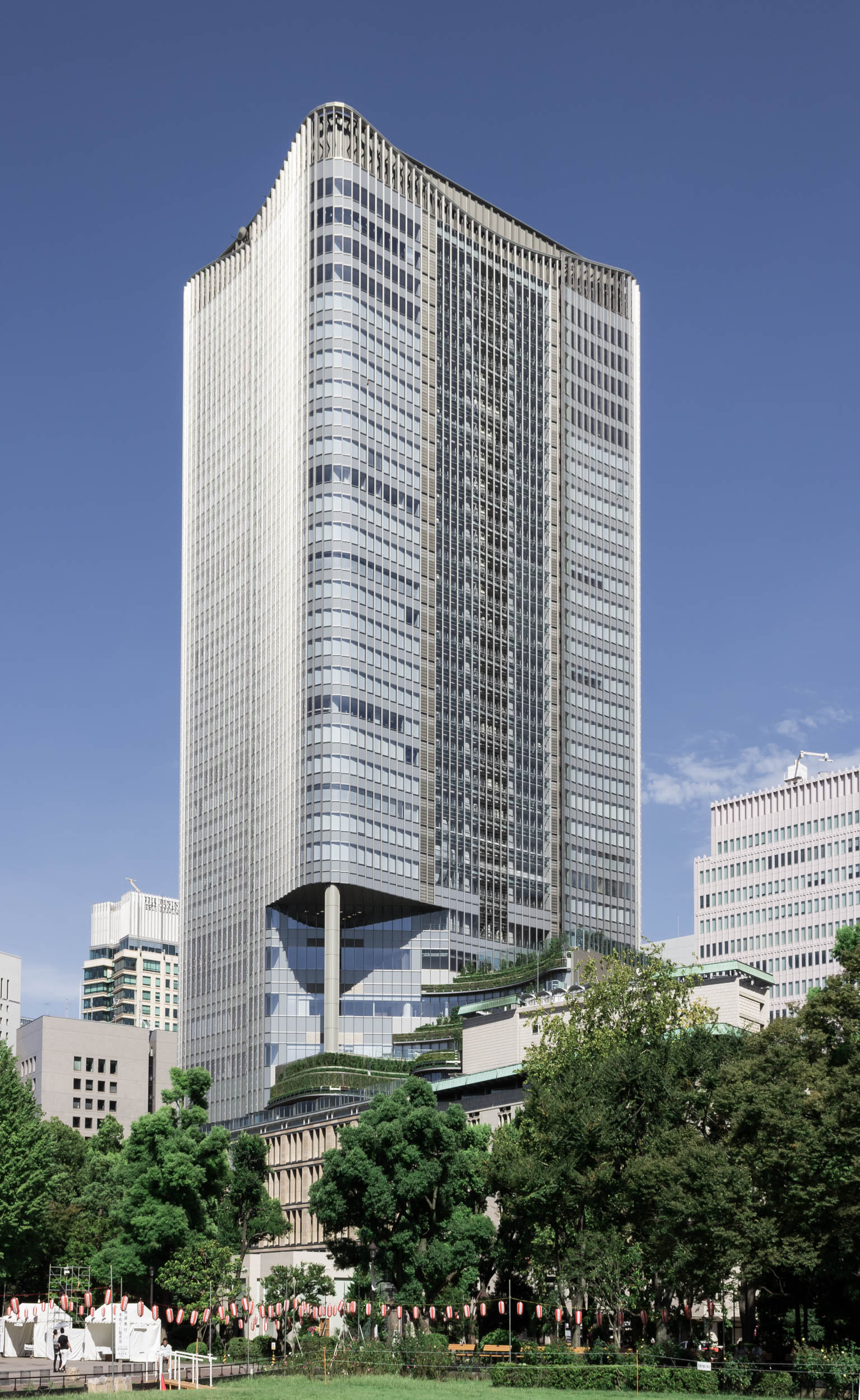
- Interactive map of Tokyo Midtown Hibiya
- Location: Yurakucho, Chiyoda, Tokyo, Japan
- Status: Complete
- Constructed: 2015–2018
- Opening: March 29, 2018
- Use: Mixed
- Website: www.hibiya.tokyo-midtown.com.e.adj.hp.transer.com/en/

Companies
- Architect: Hopkins Architects
- Developer: Mitsui Fudosan Co., Ltd
- Owner: Mitsui Fudosan Co., Ltd
- Manager: Tokyo Midtown Management Co., Ltd.

Technical details
- Buildings: 1

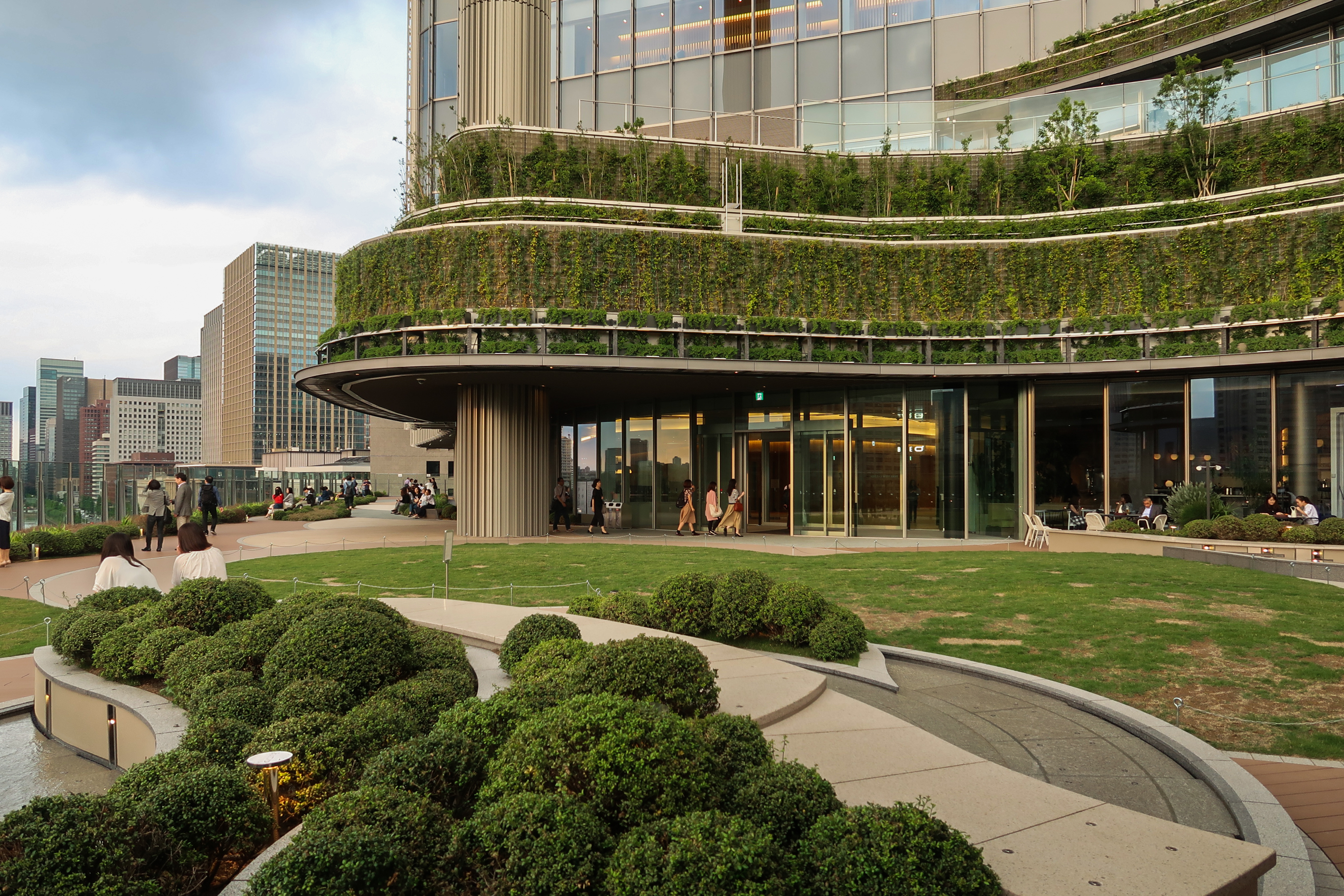
Level 6 Garden

Tokyo Midtown Hibiya (東京ミッドタウン日比谷, Tōkyō Middotaun Hibiya) is a 190,000-square-meter (2.0 million sq ft) mixed-use development in Yurakucho, Tokyo, Japan. Completed in March 2018, the project includes office, commercial, and dining and entertainment facilities.

== Overview ==
The project site overlooks Hibiya Park on a site previously occupied by the Sanshin Building (1930) and the Hibiya Mitsui Building (1960), the latter having been the head office of Mitsui Bank then of Sumitomo Mitsui Financial Group. The primary developer was Mitsui Fudosan, working in concert with several partners. The same developer owned and operated the larger Tokyo Midtown (東京ミッドタウン) multipurpose project in Tokyo’s Roppongi neighbourhood.

The building’s concave glass exterior facing Hibiya Park produces noticeable solar glare onto the streets immediately to the south of the building echoing one of the design flaws of London’s 20 Fenchurch Street skyscraper.

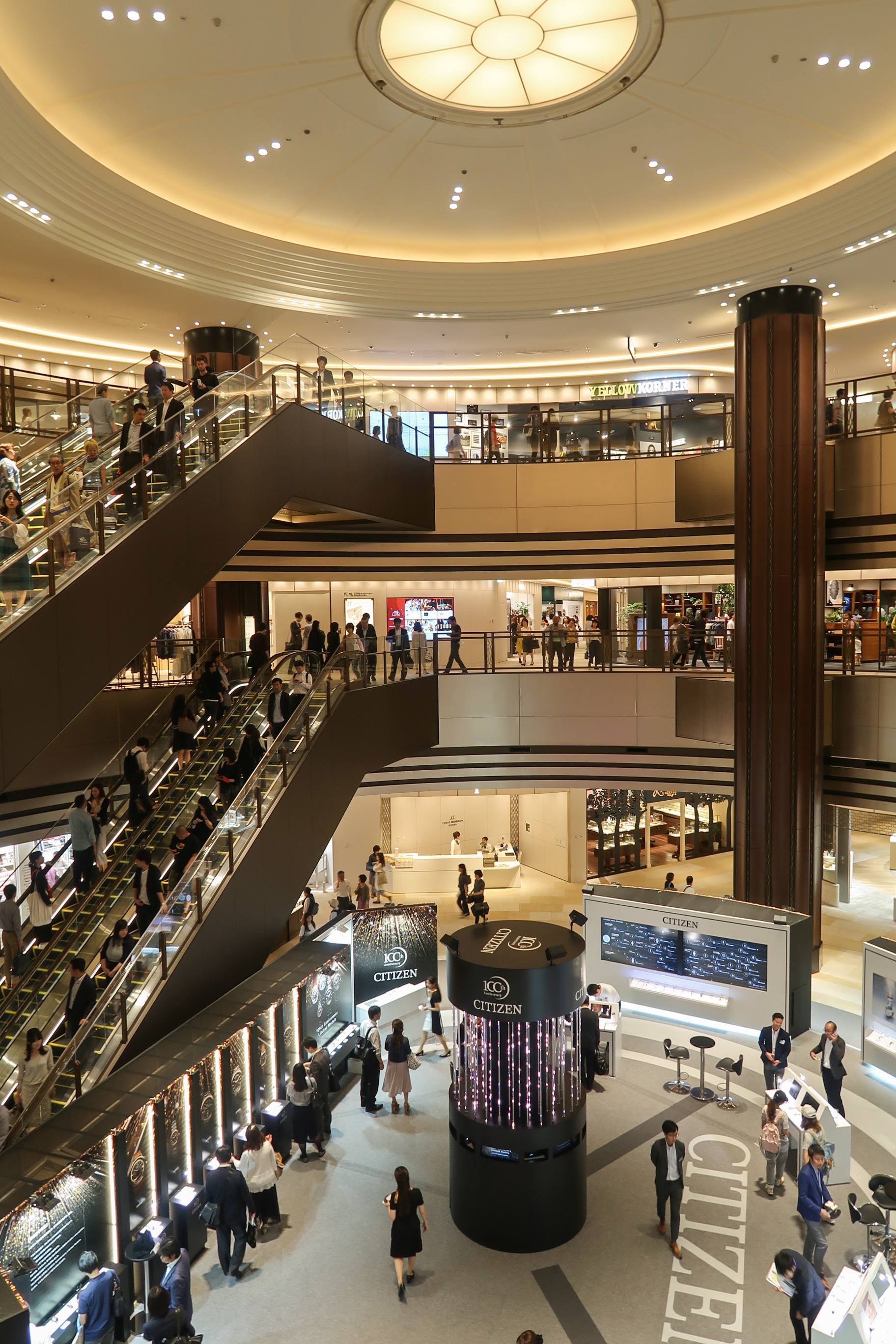
Atrium

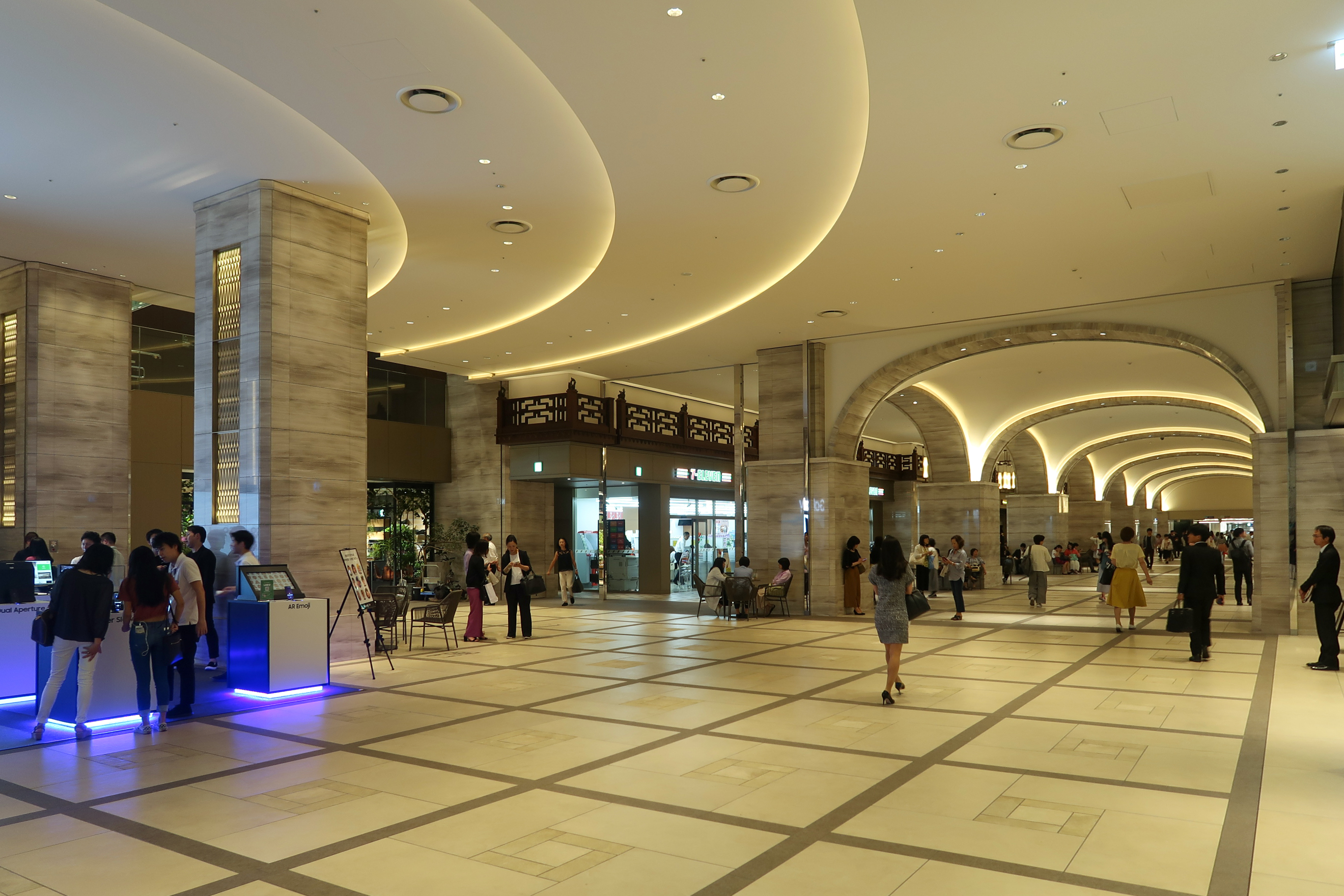
B1 Hibiya Avenue

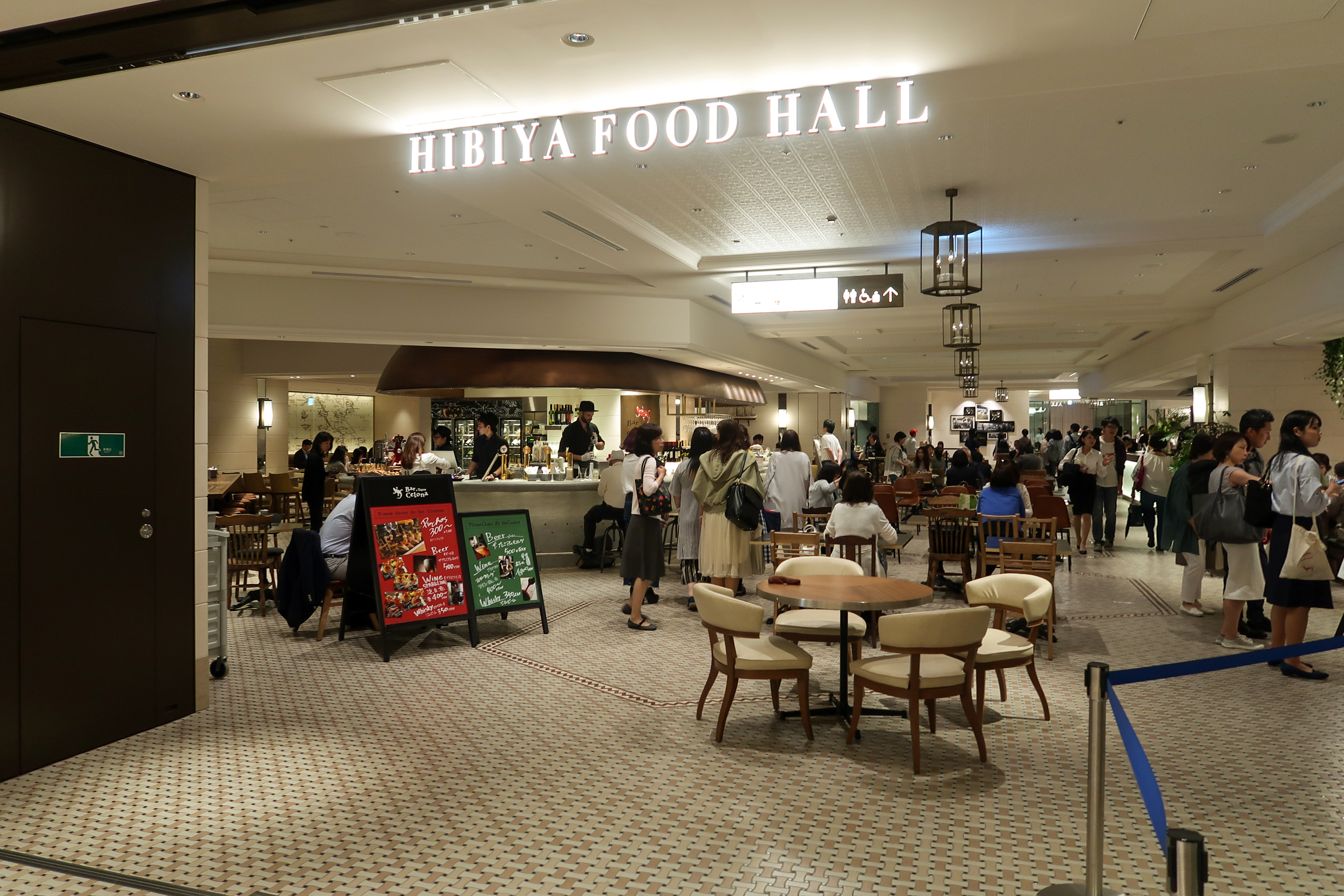
B1 Hibiya Food Hall

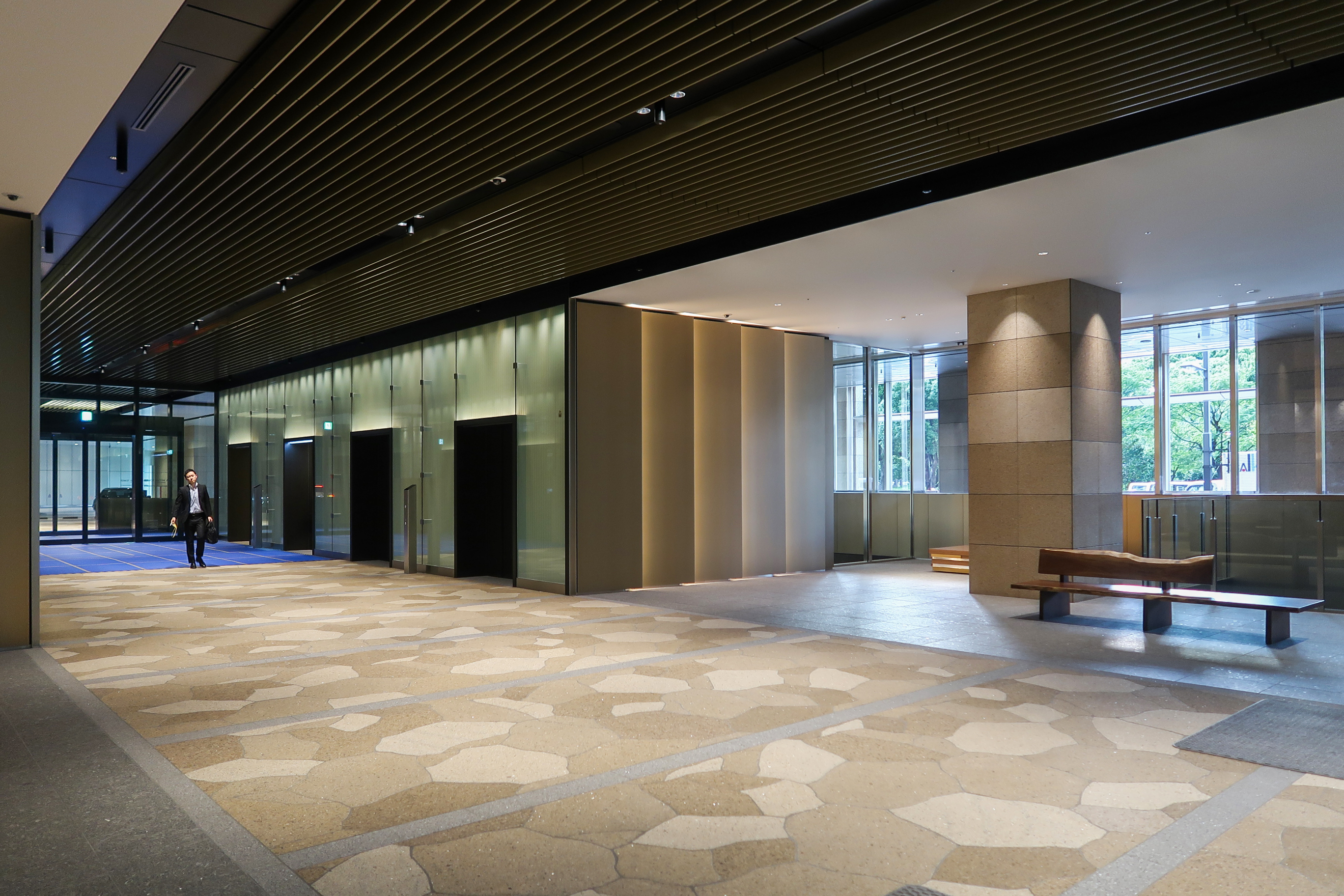
Level 1 Office Lobby

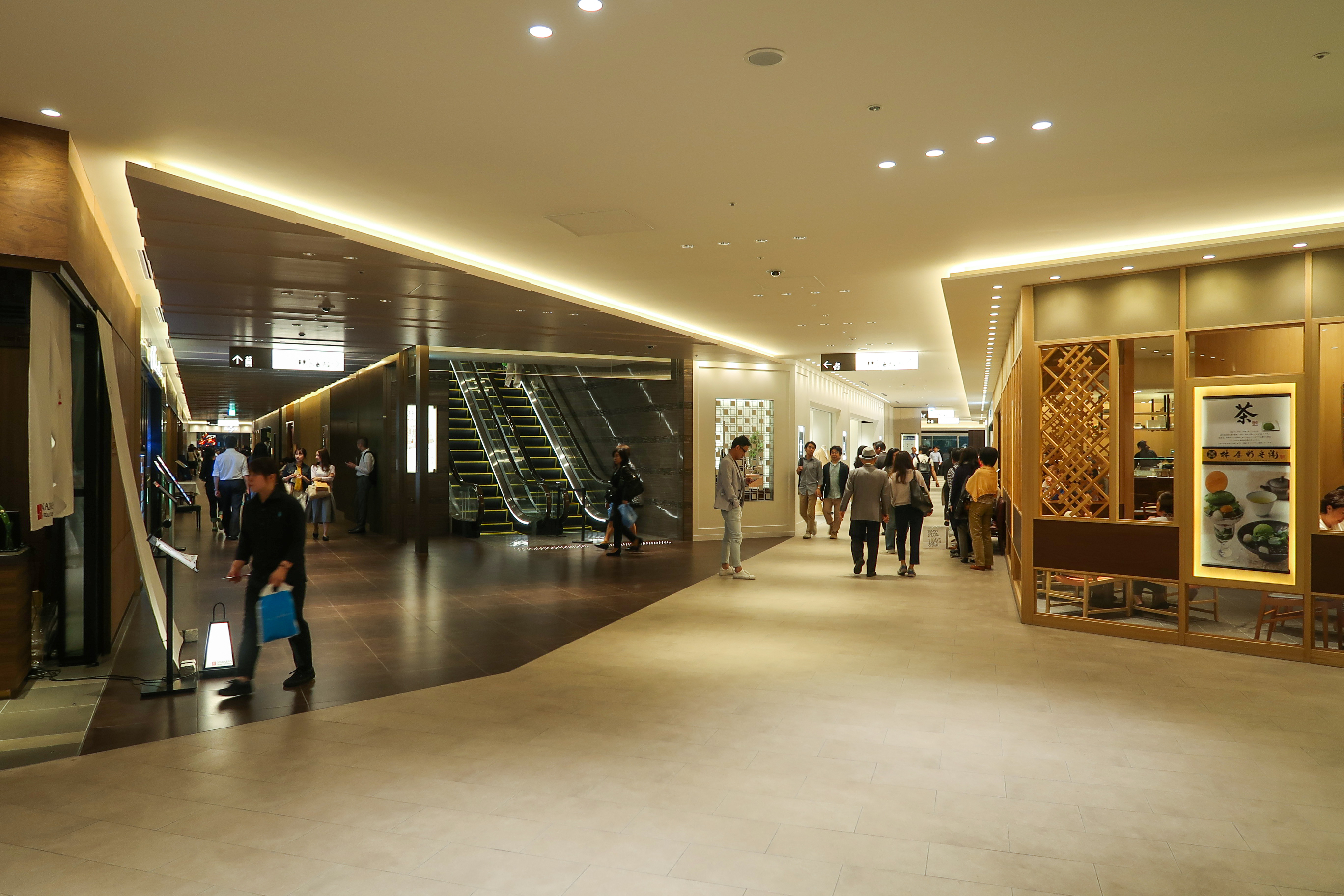
Level 2 shops

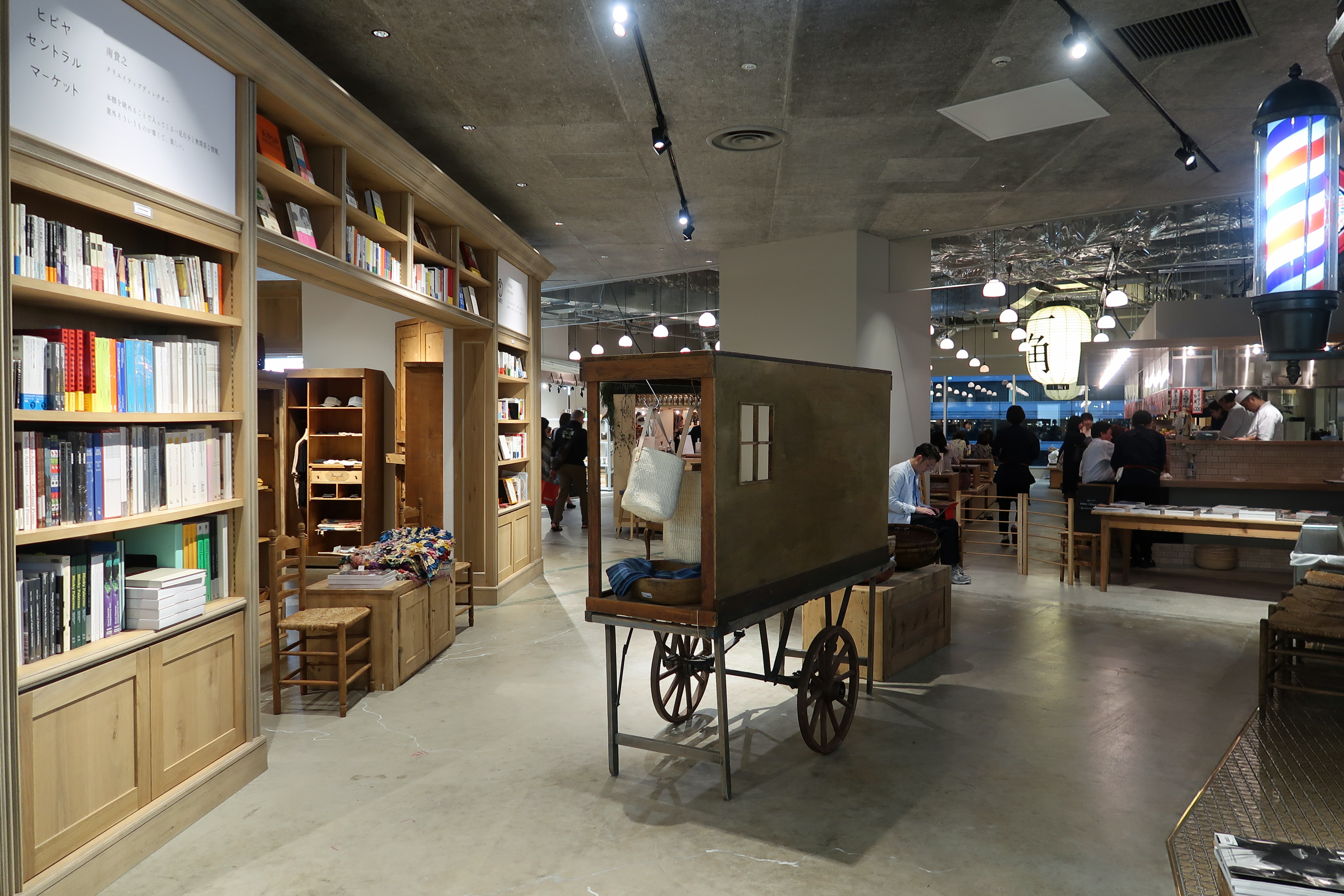
Level 3 HIBIYA CENTRAL MARKET

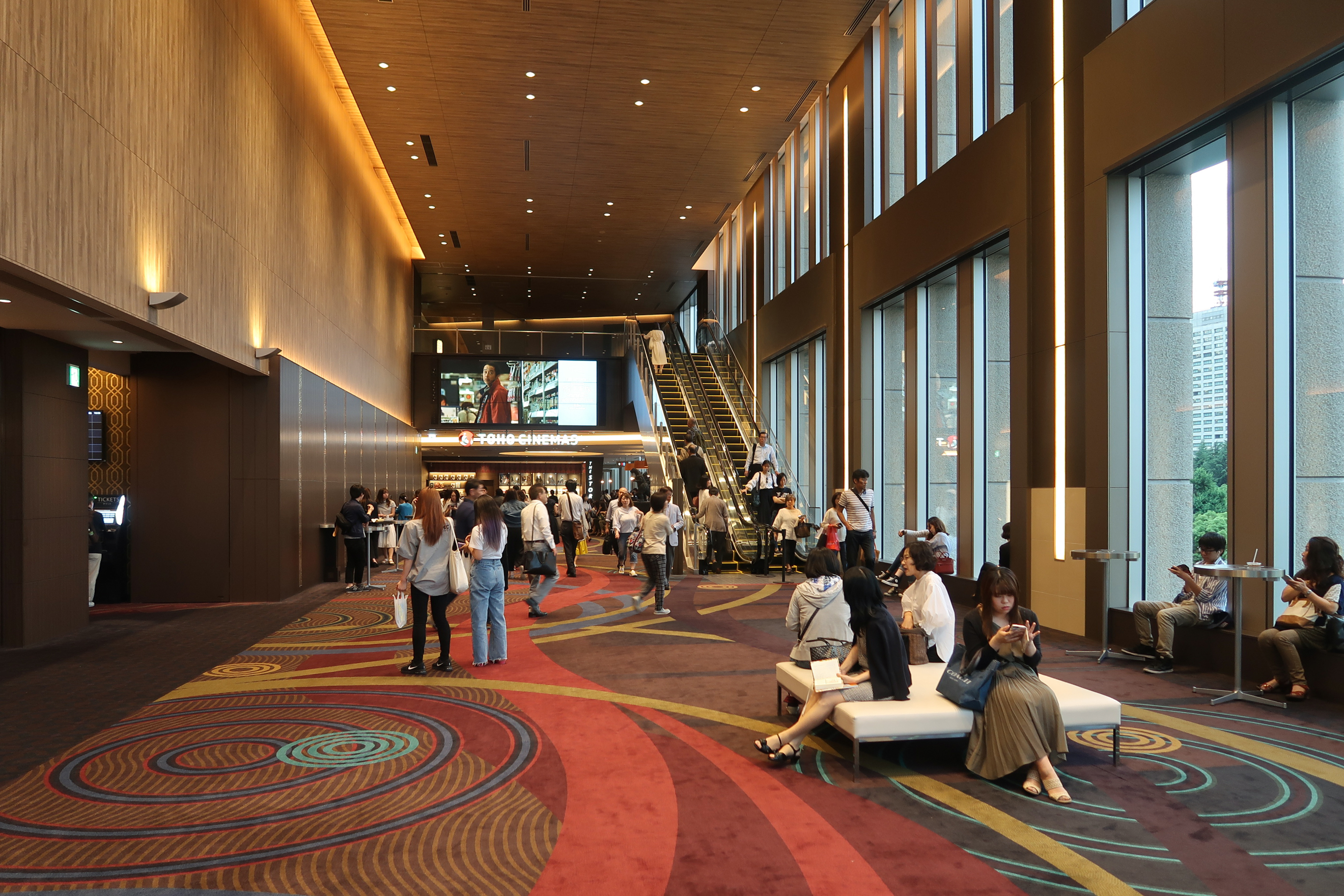
Level 4 TOHO Cinema

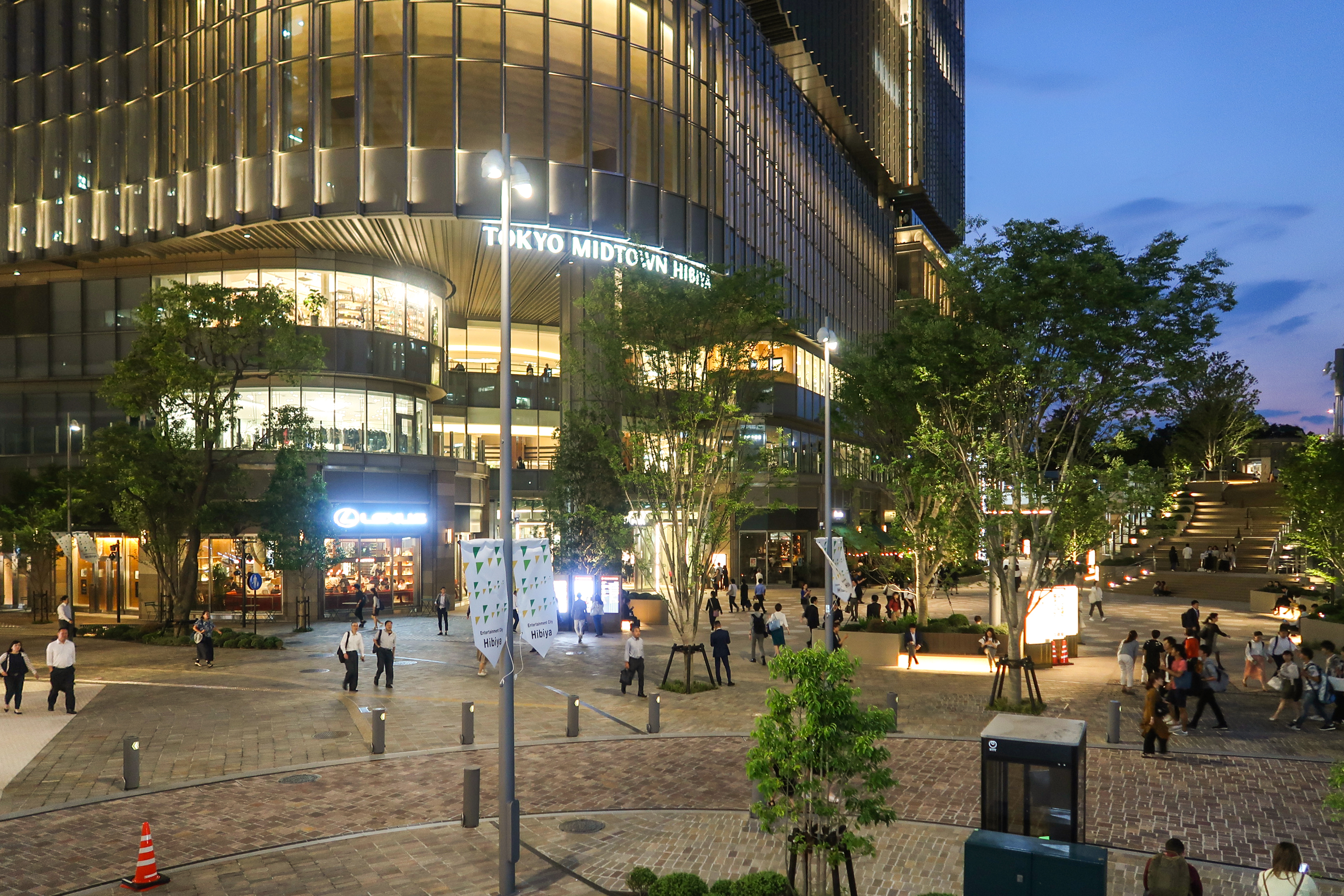
Night view

== See also ==
- List of tallest buildings and structures in Tokyo
