= Portcullis House =

Office building in Westminster, London, England

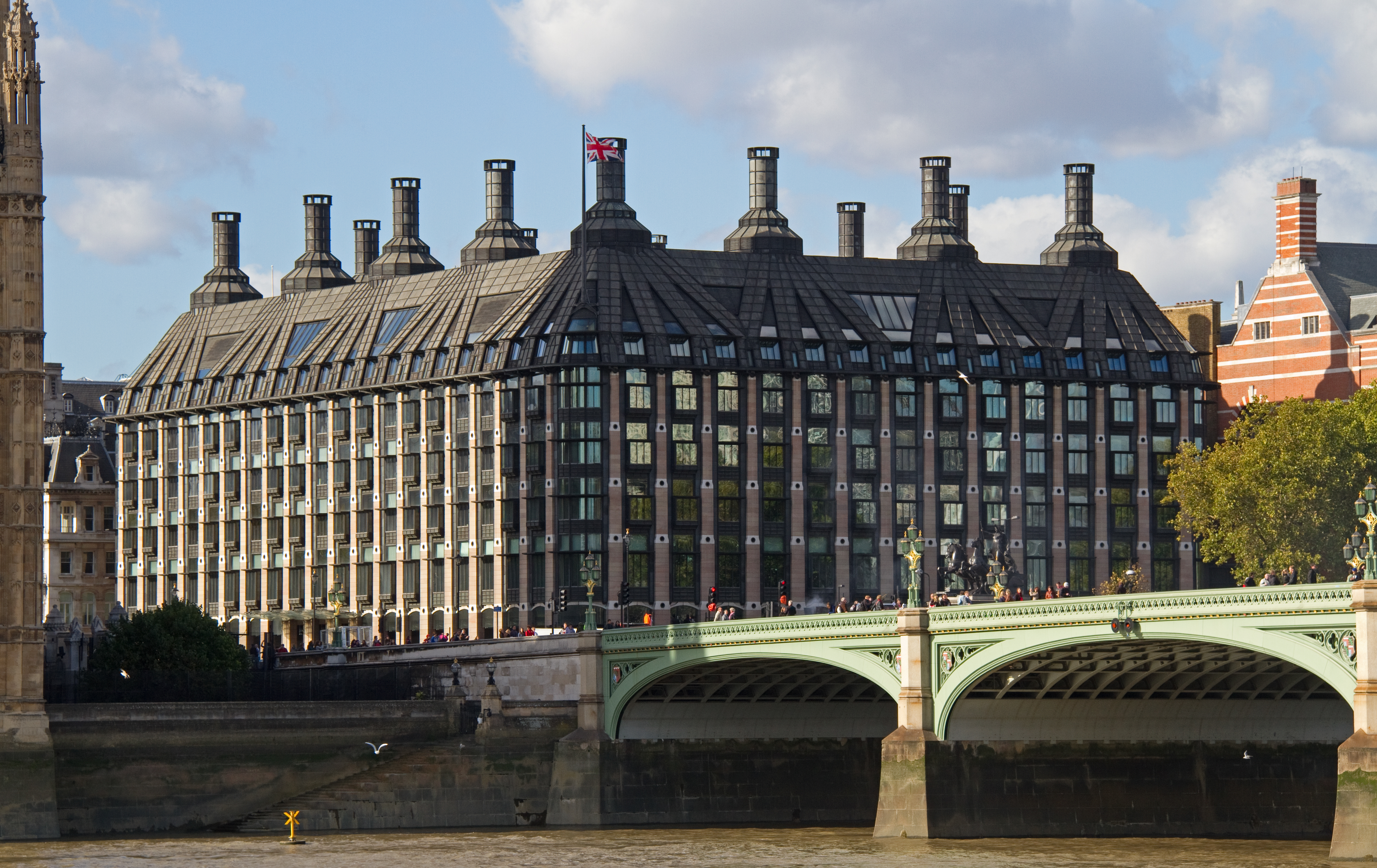
- Portcullis House
- Interactive map of the Portcullis House area

General information
- Status: Completed
- Location: Bridge Street; London; SW1A 2LW; England, London, England
- Coordinates: 51°30′05″N 0°07′30″W
- Current tenants: Parliament of the United Kingdom; Westminster Station
- Construction started: 1992
- Opened: February 2001
- Cost: £235m

Design and construction
- Architecture firm: Michael Hopkins and Partners
- Structural engineer: Ove Arup & Partners

Website
- https://www.parliament.uk/about/living-heritage/building/northern-estate/portcullishouse/

Portcullis House (PCH) is an office building in Westminster, London, England, that was commissioned in 1992 and opened in 2001 to provide offices for 213 members of the Parliament of the United Kingdom and their staff. The public entrance is on the Embankment. Part of the Parliamentary Estate, the building augments limited space in the Palace of Westminster and surroundings.

== History and use ==
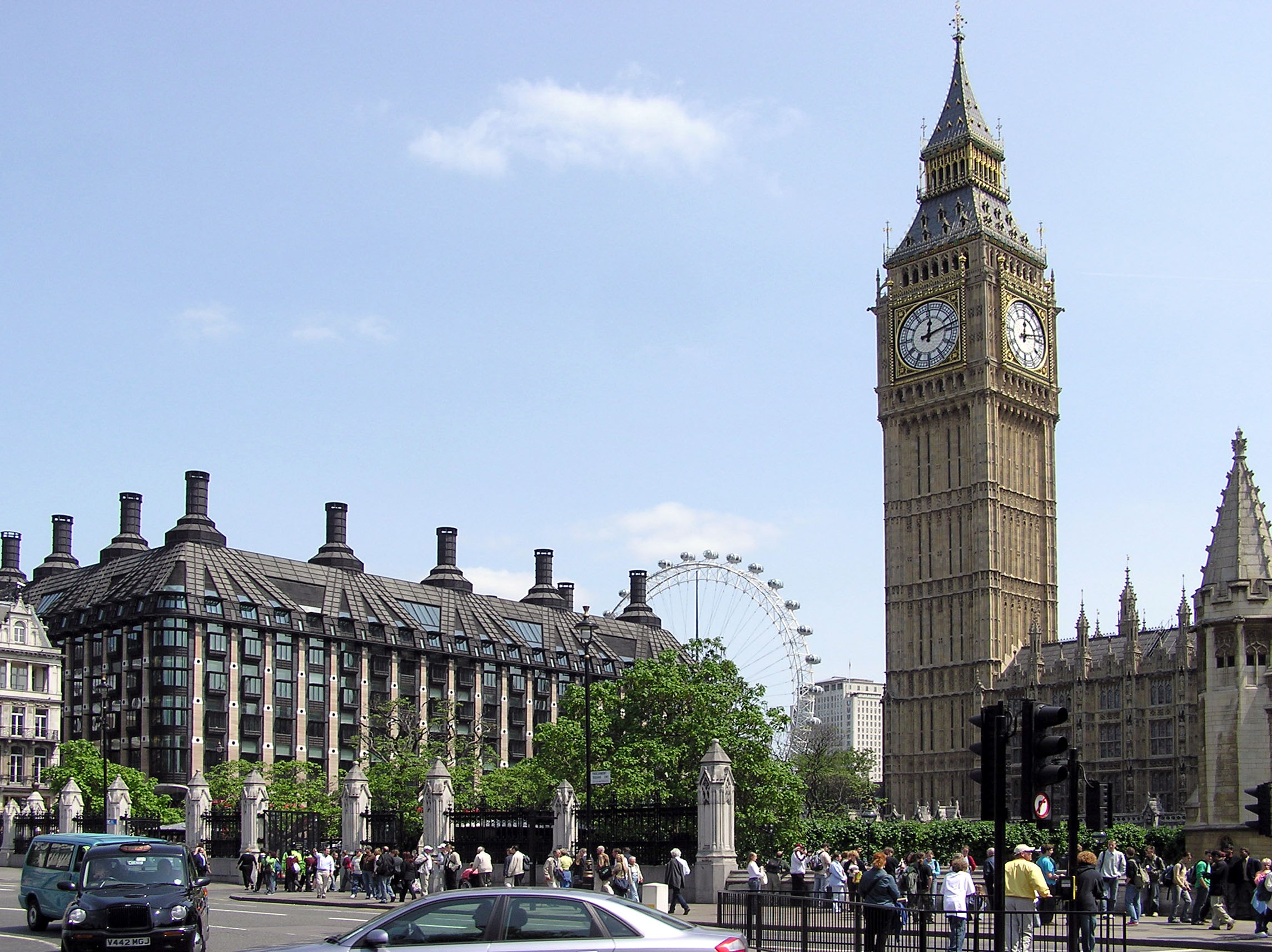
Left to right: Portcullis House with the London Eye and the Elizabeth Tower

The architects, Michael Hopkins and Partners, published their design in 1993 and the existing buildings on the site were demolished in 1994. At the same time, the London Underground was building the Jubilee Line Extension, including a new interchange station at Westminster tube station which occupies the same area; the two were thus designed and built as a single unit. Construction began with works to the existing District line station at sub-basement level. The track had to be lowered slightly and underpinned to allow the extensive excavation to the Jubilee line many feet below. The building above ground began to rise in 1998 (Note: Portcullis House, then incomplete and with its roof under construction, can briefly be glimpsed in the traditional pre-credits sequence of the James Bond film The World Is Not Enough, as Bond chases a villain by speedboat along the Thames from the MI6 Building at Vauxhall Cross to the Millennium Dome. The film was released in November 1999, having presumably been filmed a year or so earlier.) and opened in 2001. It is located at the corner of Bridge Street (at the western end of Westminster Bridge) and Victoria Embankment – overlooking the River Thames – and adjacent to the Norman Shaw South Building, which also overlooks the river.

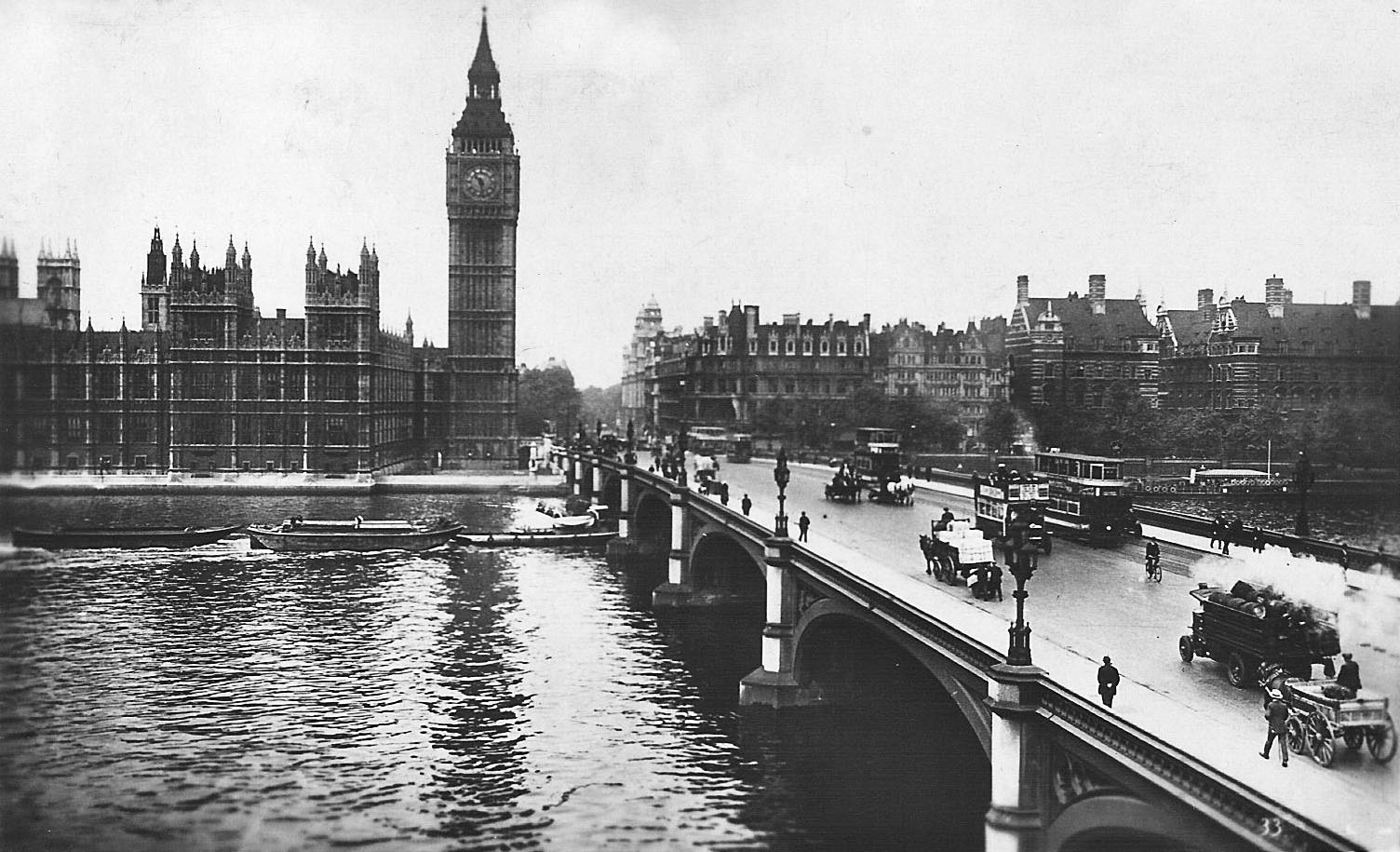
Buildings on the site of Portcullis House (centre) in 1928

The building is named after the chained portcullis used to symbolise the Houses of Parliament on letterheads and official documents. Portcullis House accommodates about one third of members of parliament; other Members and Parliamentary departments have offices in the two Norman Shaw Buildings (formerly known as Scotland Yard), in 1 Parliament Street, and in the Palace of Westminster itself.

The first floor of Portcullis House is open to members of the public to allow attendance at Committee sessions. Throughout the rest of the building, as with the rest of the Parliamentary Estate, members of the public must remain with a passholder. There is a Post Office branch within Portcullis House that is not open to the public.

== Design ==
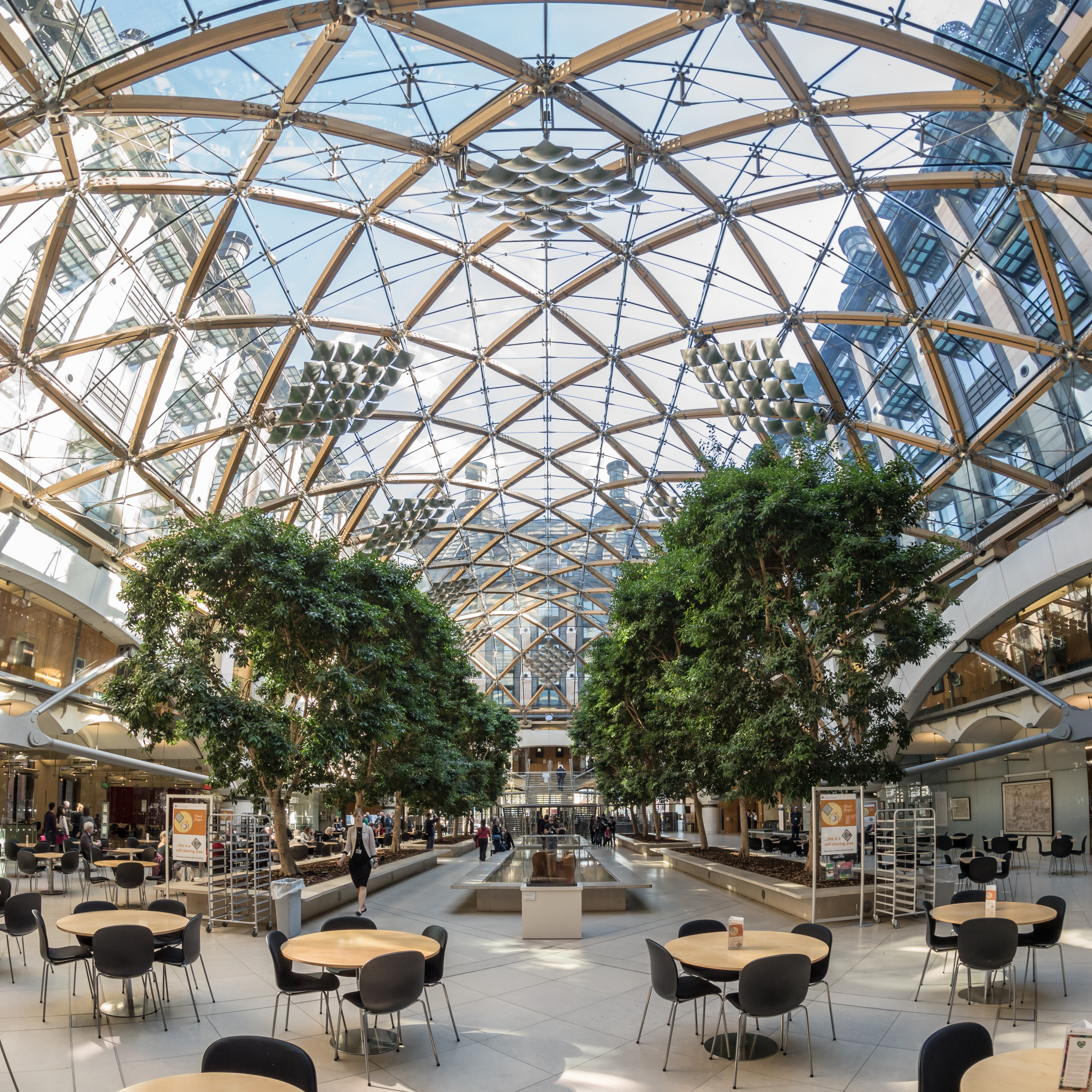
The main atrium of Portcullis House

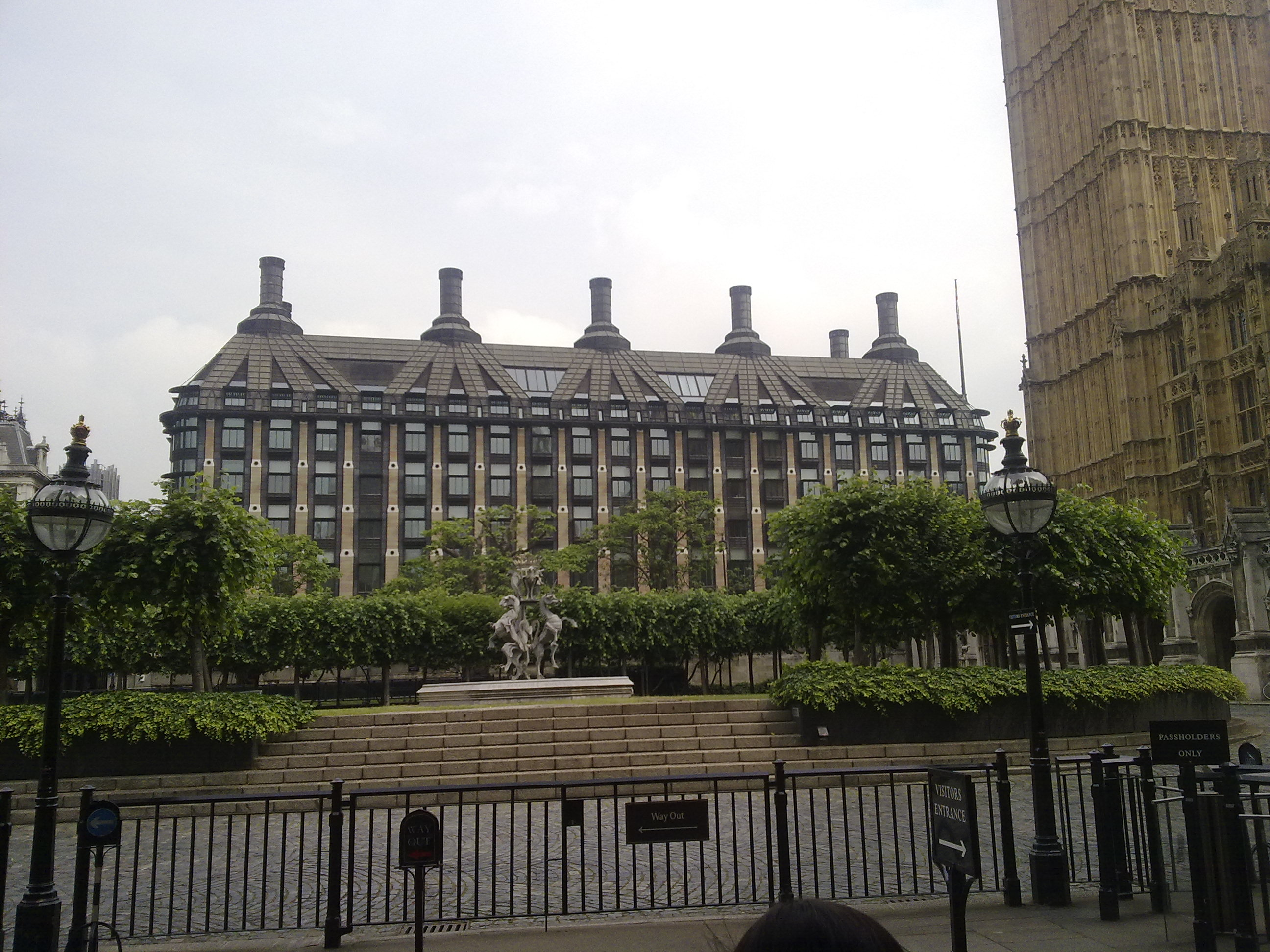
Portcullis House from the Houses of Parliament

The building was designed by Michael Hopkins and Partners and incorporates Westminster tube station below it. A thick slab of concrete separates Portcullis House from the station, reportedly to defend against any underground bomb attacks. The load is borne by the walls, without interior posts. The corners of the building are hung from the roof using massive steel beams. The design life of 120 years meant that aluminium bronze was chosen for exposed metal on the roof and walls. The structure also includes granite from Devon and was the last consignment to be excavated at Merrivale Quarry on Dartmoor. The columns between the windows are constructed of post-tensioned Birchover Gritstone.

The building's curious profile, with its rows of tall chimneys, is intended to recall the Victorian Gothic design of the Palace of Westminster and to fit in with the chimneys of the Norman Shaw Building next door. Portcullis House's chimneys are not used to expel fumes but are part of an unpowered air conditioning system, which is designed to draw air through the building by exploiting natural convection flows. It is based on the system used in 1996 in the Eastgate Centre, Harare, Zimbabwe.

The building itself was designed to look and feel like a ship inside. All the offices and passages are made up with bowed windows and light oak finishing. Each floor looks identical to the others except the ground floor which houses the main courtyard with ship-like metallic sails suspended overhead. The courtyard is decorated with trees and two shallow baths of water.

The offices at Portcullis House are generally in sets of two sharing a common bay in the centre. Each floor is unofficially allocated to a different political party so that generally MPs with similar politics are kept together. The first floor houses a number of conference suites and committee rooms, which are named after famous politicians Betty Boothroyd, Harold Macmillan, Margaret Thatcher, Clement Attlee, Harold Wilson, and Jo Grimond. These Committee rooms are accessible to the public and are fitted with television cameras and microphones, to broadcast the proceedings via BBC Parliament and via parliamentlive.tv.

All rooms in the building are fitted with annunciators (monitors which announce in real-time the current business in the Chambers of the House of Commons, the House of Lords, or both). Division bells are also installed throughout the building, which alert MPs to the calling of a division (vote) in the Chamber of the House of Commons. Along with this, visual aids (a flashing image of a bell) are displayed on television sets and computer desktops in MPs' offices when the Division bell sounds.

On the ground floor are a range of services including a waiter-service restaurant ("The Adjournment"), informal cafeteria ("The Debate") and a coffee shop ("The Despatch Box"), available only to pass holders and their guests. There is also a post office and an e-library, an enquiry point where Members and staff can use networked computers, run by the House of Commons Library. There is also an underground passage into the Palace of Westminster and a connection to the 1 Parliament Street building and to the Norman Shaw Buildings. For security reasons this is now the main route of access for Parliament.

== Cost ==
When commissioned in 1992 the cost of Portcullis House was to be £165m. After building cost inflation and delays, the price increased to £235m. Costs included £150,000 for decorative fig trees, £2m for electric blinds and, for each MP, a reclining chair at £440. A parliamentary inquiry into the over-spend was undertaken by Sir Thomas Legg. Although completed in 2000, the report was never published. By April 2012 the fig trees, which were rented, had cost almost £400,000.

== See also ==
- Parliament of the United Kingdom
- Tŷ Hywel
