= Golden Coach =

Golden Coach may refer to:

- Golden coaches used by monarchs
- Golden Coach (Netherlands) owned and used by Dutch royal family
- Golden Coach (Germany) in Sondershausen Palace museum
- The Golden Coach, 1952 English-language French-Italian film by Jean Renoir
- The Golden Coach, 2002 album by Australian musician Jamie Hutchings
