= Caroline Flack =

English radio and television presenter (1979–2020)

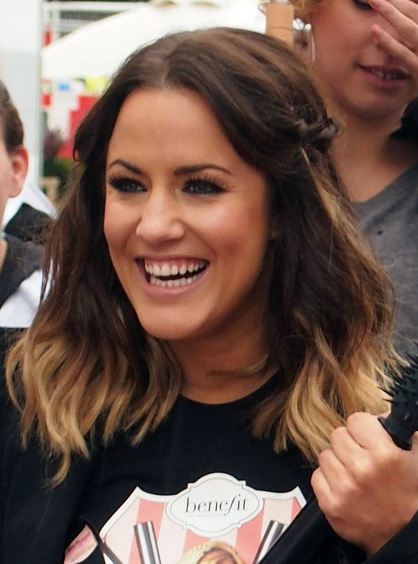
- Flack in 2012
- Born: Caroline Louise Flack; 9 November 1979; Enfield, London, England
- Died: 15 February 2020 (aged 40); Stoke Newington, London, England
- Cause of death: Suicide by hanging
- Occupations: Television presenter; actress
- Years active: 2001–2020

Caroline Louise Flack (9 November 1979 – 15 February 2020) was an English television presenter. Flack grew up in Norfolk and took an interest in dancing and theatre while at school. She began her professional career as an actress, starring in the comedy sketch show Bo' Selecta! (2002) and went on to present various ITV2 shows including I'm a Celebrity...Get Me Out of Here! NOW! (2009–2010) and The Xtra Factor (2011–2013).

In 2014, Flack won the twelfth series of BBC's Strictly Come Dancing and was praised for achieving a record perfect score in the final. The following year, she began presenting The X Factor, with Olly Murs, replacing the long-standing presenter Dermot O'Leary, and Love Island, hosting until her resignation in December 2019 after being arrested for assault.

On 15 February 2020, Flack was found dead at her home in North East London; in August, a coroner's inquest recorded a verdict of suicide.

== Early life ==
Caroline Louise Flack was born on 9 November 1979 at Chase Farm Hospital, Enfield, the youngest of the four children of Coca-Cola sales representative Ian Flack and his wife, Christine (née Callis). She had a twin sister, older than her by six minutes. Shortly after her birth, her father was promoted to the company's management, and the family moved to Thetford, Norfolk. When Flack was seven, they moved again to nearby East Wretham. Flack attended Great Hockham Primary School and Wayland High School in Watton, Norfolk. She developed an interest in dancing and performed in village pantomimes while at school. As a pupil, she was given medical treatment for being underweight. Between 1996 and 1999, she studied dancing and musical theatre at the Bodywork Company in Cambridge.

== Career ==
In 2002, Flack gained her break on television playing a version of Michael Jackson's pet chimpanzee Bubbles on the sketch show Bo' Selecta!. She then presented the International Pepsi Chart Show, and Fash FC which followed footballer John Fashanu managing an amateur team. In 2005, she had a regular segment on the video games show When Games Attack. From 2006 to 2008, she co-presented the Saturday morning show TMi with Sam & Mark, which aired on BBC Two and the CBBC Channel. Subsequently, she hosted the CBBC show Escape from Scorpion Island together with Reggie Yates.

Flack hosted the CBBC coverage of Comic Relief Does Fame Academy in March 2007, commenting on the semi-finals of the Eurovision Song Contest 2008 with Paddy O'Connell. She also hosted Big Brother's Big Mouth during the 2008 series. The Daily Mirror journalist Rob Leigh commented that "her sharp delivery makes her the best presenter they've had on this series". She was also reported to be replacing Dermot O'Leary on Big Brother's Little Brother.

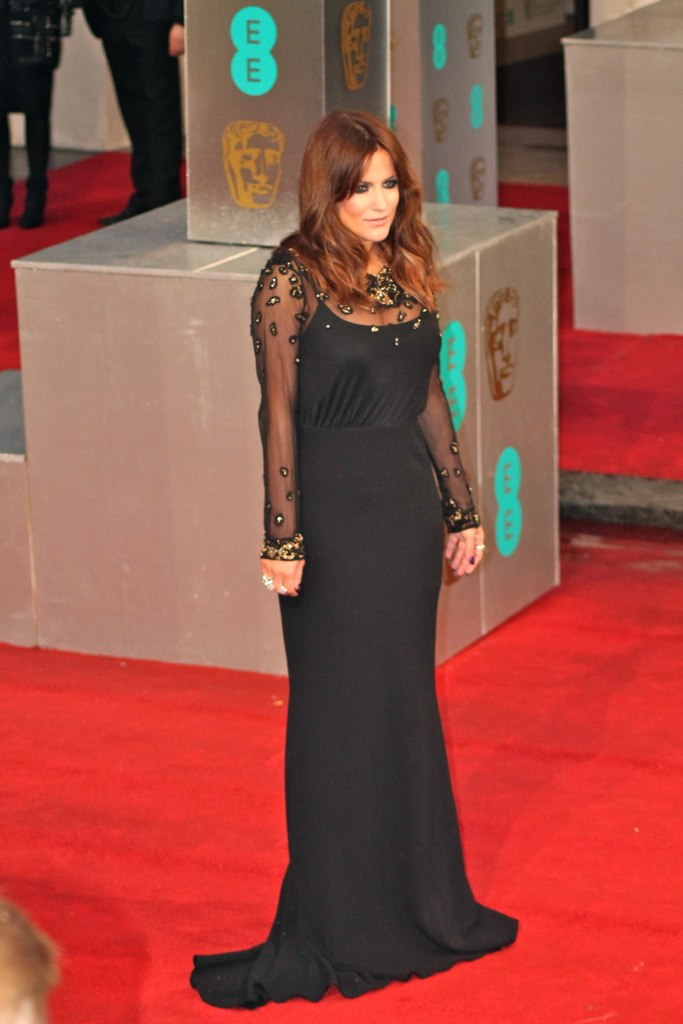
Flack at the 2013 BAFTAs

In 2008, Flack co-presented the reboot of Gladiators, staying for two series. In July 2009, she was a substitute presenter on the BBC's Sunday show Something for the Weekend, while Amanda Hamilton was on maternity leave. In the same year Flack began hosting the ITV2 reality show I'm a Celebrity... Get Me Out of Here NOW! She also won BBC Three's Dancing on Wheels with disabled partner James O'Shea and the pair represented Great Britain in the 2009 Wheelchair Dancing European Championships in Tel Aviv, finishing 16th in their category.

On 16 February 2010, she presented backstage at the 2010 Brit Awards on ITV2. In November, she returned to host I'm a Celebrity, Get Me out of Here Now! on ITV2. She also modelled for the magazine Maxim in the same year.

In 2011, Flack was a team captain on the ITV2 game show Minute to Win It. That year she and Olly Murs presented the eighth series of The Xtra Factor, replacing Konnie Huq. Flack and Murs both returned for the ninth series. Flack returned for the tenth series in 2013, while Murs was replaced by Matt Richardson. Both left at the end of the series. Flack hosted the ITV2 show Viral Tap in 2014. In December 2014, she reunited with Murs to host a Christmas Day and New Year's Eve programme on British radio station Magic Radio.

Flack was announced as a contestant on the twelfth series of Strictly Come Dancing in 2014, partnered with Pasha Kovalev. The couple went on to win the series that December. They earned the first perfect 40 of the series for their salsa in the semi-finals, followed by an additional three in the finals giving them a perfect total of 120 points, a previously unmatched feat. Judge Bruno Tonioli described Flack as a "golden sex goddess" in her cha-cha-cha performance, while Darcey Bussell said their showdance reminded her of "watching a beautiful contemporary ballet". The win motivated Flack to do more theatre work, leading to her starring as Irene Roth in a touring version of the musical Crazy for You in 2017, and playing Roxie Hart in a production of Chicago at the Phoenix Theatre the following year.

In April 2015, it was announced that Flack, along with Murs, would replace Dermot O'Leary as the hosts for the 12th series of The X Factor from August. The following February, Flack and Murs confirmed that they would not be returning for the 13th series of The X Factor and were replaced by a returning O'Leary.

Flack began presenting ITV2's Love Island in 2015. The programme had previously been shown on ITV a decade earlier but had not been particularly successful. With Flack as presenter, the show attracted 4 million viewers by 2018, becoming the most watched on the channel. She also presented the spin-off show Love Island: Aftersun when the third series was broadcast in 2017. She stood down from the role in December 2019 following allegations of common assault. She was nominated as best television presenter at the National Television Awards four times from 2017 to 2020 consecutively for her work on the show.

In December 2015, she was part of the presenting team for ITV's Christmas telethon Text Santa. In May 2016, she began co-presenting Sunday Morning Breakfast from 9 am to noon over the summer with Gethin Jones across the Heart Network.

Flack had been due to present a reality series about cosmetic surgery called The Surjury on Channel 4, but it was cancelled following her death in February 2020. She has a cameo role in the film Greed, which was released on 21 February 2020. The trailer, which featured her role, premiered on the same day.

=== Strictly Come Dancing scores ===
Week #	Dance / Song	Judges' scores					Result
Week #	Dance / Song	Horwood	Bussell	Goodman	Tonioli	Total	Result
1	Cha-cha-cha / "Can You Feel It?"	6	7	7	7	27	No Elimination
2	Tango / "Blame"	7	7	7	8	29	Safe
3	Rumba / "I Don't Want to Miss a Thing"	8	8	8	9	33	Safe
4	Quickstep / "We Go Together"	8	8	9	8	33	Safe
5	Paso doble / "Live and Let Die"	8	9	8	9	34	Safe
6	Samba / "Le Freak"	7	8	8	9	32	Safe
7	Waltz / "3 Times a Lady"	7	8	8	8	31	Bottom two
8	Jive / "Crocodile Rock"	9	9	9	10	37	Safe
9	American Smooth / "Mack the Knife"	7	8	9	9	33	Safe
10	Charleston / "Istanbul"	9	10	10	10	39	Safe
11	Argentine tango / "La cumparsita"	9	10	10	10	39	Safe
12	Foxtrot / "Diamonds"; Salsa / "María"	8; 10	9; 10	9; 10	9; 10	35; 40	Safe
13	Cha-cha-cha / "Can You Feel It?"; Freestyle / "Angels"; Charleston / "Istanbul"	10; 10; 10	10; 10; 10	10; 10; 10	10; 10; 10	40; 40; 40	WINNER

== Personal life ==
Flack had long-term mental health issues, attempting suicide and self-harming on various occasions as a young presenter and actress. She was known not to take the criticism that came with fame well, and TV producer Anna Blue said that "she just wasn't emotionally wired to deal with all the problems that came with being famous".

She dated Prince Harry in 2009, but the relationship ended quickly after the media began reporting on it, according to both of their autobiographies. In 2011, she briefly dated Harry Styles when he was 17. Around 2014 and 2015, she was in a relationship with Sam Smith's manager Jack Street. She was briefly engaged to the reality TV personality Andrew Brady in 2018, and dated the rugby player Danny Cipriani in 2019.

On 13 December 2019, Flack was charged with assaulting her boyfriend, tennis player Lewis Burton, after an incident reported by Burton at her Islington flat the previous morning. Police found Flack covered in blood when they arrived, and they reported that she admitted that she had struck Burton (saying "I did it, I whacked him round the head like that"), before warning them she would kill herself. Her inquest later found that Flack had hit and attacked Burton while he slept as she thought he was cheating on her, and that Burton had sustained a head wound. On 17 December, Flack stood down from hosting Love Island in order to "not detract attention from the upcoming series".

It was later reported that Flack was glad for the break from her hosting role as she was experiencing "personal issues" and had been suffering from an emotional breakdown for "a very long time". Despite this, the show's producers said that the "door was open" for a possible future return as host. Flack pleaded not guilty to the charges at Highbury Corner Magistrates' Court on 23 December 2019. Her solicitor told the court that Burton did not support the prosecution and that "he is not the victim, as he would say, he was a witness". She was released on bail with the condition that she not contact Burton and was due to stand trial on 4 March 2020. Burton posted an affectionate Valentine's Day message on his Instagram profile the day before she died. Flack's management criticised the Crown Prosecution Service (CPS) for continuing with what her management termed a "show trial", even after Burton decided not to support the prosecution. The CPS chief prosecutor responded that he was unaware of Flack's background and that "You cannot do what you think is popular".

== Death ==
On 15 February 2020, Flack was found dead in her flat, in Stoke Newington, London. She was 40 years old. The lawyer acting for her family stated that her death was a suicide by hanging. Her private funeral took place in Greenacres Memorial Park at Colney near Norwich on 10 March.

The inquest into her death opened on 19 February, and was adjourned until 5 August. On 6 August, after a two-day hearing, the coroner found that Flack's death was a suicide.

=== Reactions ===
As a result of her death, a scheduled Love Island highlights episode on ITV2 was cancelled and E4 pulled a Love Island sketch on the 10th season of Robot Chicken involving Bitch Pudding (a recurring female character of the show) and Diane Kruger voicing Caroline Flack out of respect. The next episode of Love Island to air showed a tribute to Flack along with advertisements for the support charity Samaritans. Flack's is the third suicide linked to Love Island. (Note: Former contestants Sophie Gradon and Mike Thalassitis had also died by suicide after appearing on the show. Gradon's boyfriend also died by suicide in the weeks following her death.) Her death raised questions about the pressures of the programme and resulted in calls for it to be cancelled, with some social media users pointing out that The Jeremy Kyle Show had recently been cancelled after a participant had died by suicide.

Following Flack's death, British Labour politician Lisa Nandy blamed social media networks for failing to prevent harassment and bullying, saying: "In no other area of life would we allow private companies to police themselves. We ought to make sure the state has a system of regulation and support around that." Several other British politicians, including Keir Starmer, Grant Shapps, Daisy Cooper, Matt Hancock, Nadine Dorries and Kate Osamor criticised the coverage of Flack in press outlets and on social media; Cooper said: "In Britain we have trial by courts and not trial by media for a reason. Regardless of what took place she should not have been hounded to death by tabloid newspapers desperate for clickbait." Flack's friend, Stephanie Davis, set up a petition to establish new laws for "safeguarding celebrities and people in the public eye", which attracted over half a million signatures in a week.

Following a review of Flack's charges by the CPS, it was found that the decision to go ahead with the trial was handled appropriately. On 13 February 2023, the Metropolitan Police apologised to Flack's mother, Christine, saying that while no misconduct was identified, records should have been kept per standard procedure and they would listen to recommendations from the Independent Office for Police Conduct. She later said she believed Flack would still be alive had she not been charged with assault.

At the 2020 Brit Awards, a few days after Flack's death, singer Harry Styles wore a black ribbon on his jacket as a tribute to her.

== Legacy ==
In February 2020, Flack's ex-boyfriend, Andrew Brady, set up a fundraiser in Caroline's name for the trans children's charity Mermaids, which Flack was passionate about.

In February 2021, on the anniversary of her death, a mural of Flack was painted by artist Scott Wilcock on a wall in Ashton in Makerfield, near Wigan, as a tribute. It featured a quote by author Clare Pooley that Flack had requoted, "In a world where you can be anything, be kind".

In June 2021, several of Flack's friends participated in a charity fundraising event that was dedicated to her memory. The event, called "Climb for Caroline", challenged participants to climb 24 peaks in the Lake District within a 24-hour period. Proceeds from the event were donated to the Samaritans. One of Flack's friends who participated, Olly Murs, noted afterwards that the event was a particularly appropriate remembrance of Flack because exercise was one of the strategies she had used to manage her mental health.

The music festival Flackstock is named after her in honour and the first series of concerts took place in 2022.

It was reported in June 2026 that her brother, Paul Flack, was found unresponsive at his home in Norwich, and died later in hospital, aged 55. Norfolk Coroner's Court heard a provisional cause of death was cardiac arrest due to hanging.

== Filmography ==
=== Principal shows ===
Year	Title	Role	Notes	Ref.
2001	Is Harry on the Boat?	Blonde	British made-for-TV film, based on the lives of holiday reps in Ibiza	
2002, 2004	Bo' Selecta!	Bubbles		
2003–2004	Fash FC	Presenter		
2004	Weapons of Mass Distraction	Corporal Flack	A satirical comedy taking a sideways look at the tabloid news	
2005	The Games: Live at Trackside	Co-presenter	2 series	
2005	When Games Attack	Co-presenter and reporter		
2006–2008	TMi	Co-presenter	3 series	
2007	Comic Relief Does Fame Academy	Co-presenter		
2007	Escape from Scorpion Island	Host	1 series	
2008	Eurovision Song Contest 2008	Semi-finals commentator		
2008	Big Brother's Big Mouth	Week 5 presenter	5 episodes	
2009	Gladiators	Co-presenter	1 series	
2009	Something for the Weekend	Presenter	As maternity cover for the permanent presenter Amanda Hamilton	
2009	Dancing on Wheels	Participant	Winner	
2009–2010	I'm a Celebrity...Get Me Out of Here! NOW!	Co-presenter	2 series	
2010	The Whole 19 Yards	Co-presenter	1 series	
2010	BRIT Awards: Backstage	Co-presenter		
2011	Minute to Win It	Team captain	1 series	
2011–2013	The Xtra Factor	Co-presenter	3 series	
2013	The X Factor	Backstage presenter	Live Shows	
2014	Viral Tap	Presenter	1 series	
2014	Strictly Come Dancing	Contestant	Series 12 winner	
2015	The X Factor	Co-presenter	Series 12	
2015	Text Santa	Co-presenter	Christmas appeal show	
2015–2019	Love Island	Presenter	5 series	
2017–2019	Love Island: Aftersun	Main presenter	Love Island spin-off show	
2021	Caroline Flack: Her Life and Death	Archive footage	Documentary charting Flack's life and death	
2025	Caroline Flack: Search For The Truth	Archive footage	Disney+ Documentary	

=== Guest appearances ===
- Celebrity Juice (13 May 2010, 6 October 2011, 26 April 2012, 18 October 2012, 17 October 2013, 1 May 2014, 19 March 2015, 31 March 2016) – Panelist
- Never Mind the Buzzcocks (2 December 2011, 12 November 2012) – Panelist
- Loose Women (25 June 2012, 12 January 2015, 13 June 2017, 20 December 2018) – Guest
- Sweat the Small Stuff (30 April 2013) – Panelist
- Who Wants to Be a Millionaire? (22 June 2013) – Contestant
- Alan Carr: Chatty Man (3 October 2014, 29 May 2015) – Guest
- Alan Carr's New Year Specstacular (31 December 2014) – Guest

=== Radio ===
Year	Station	Show	Role	Ref.
2016	Heart Network	Sunday Mornings	Co-presenter	

=== Bibliography ===
Flack published her autobiography Storm in a C-Cup in 2015. Following her death, it was reissued in 2020, with further information about her battles with anxiety.

It has been confirmed by Simon & Schuster that Flack had been working on another book before her death, which blended aspects of self-help with her personal recollections on maintaining good mental health.

== See also ==
- List of Strictly Come Dancing contestants
