= Peabody (band) =

Australian rock band

- Origin: Sydney, Australia
- Genres: Rock, post-punk, indie rock
- Years active: 1994–present
- Labels: Nonzero Records; Peabrain Recordings; ABC Music
- Members: Bruno Brayovic; Ben Chamie; Tristan Courtney-Prior; Jared Harrison
- Past members: Graeme Trewin; Garry Butler; Dave Bembrick
- Website: Official website

Peabody are an Australian four-piece rock band, formed in 1994.

== Career ==
Peabody formed as a three-piece group after leaving school in Sydney in 1994. They entered the Sydney live circuit, playing at venues like The Lansdowne Hotel and The Iron Duke, then subsequently larger venues such as The Annandale Hotel, The Hopetoun Hotel and The Sandringham Hotel.

The band recorded and self-released two early EPs, before beginning an association with Sydney-based independent record label Nonzero Records, founded in 2001.

Through Nonzero Records, the band met producer Jamie Hutchings, leader of label-mates Bluebottle Kiss, who produced their first album, 2003's Professional Againster (named after a song by New Bomb Turks), and their second LP, The New Violence, released in 2005. According to critic Mark Nielsen, "The New Violence shows a darker side to the group, with songs that are still well crafted yet less immediate".

Their single, "Got You on My Radar", featuring guest vocals from Sarah Blasko, reached No. 13 on the AIR charts.

Midway through 2006, drummer Graeme Trewin left the band, and was replaced later that year by Jared Harrison, also of Bluebottle Kiss. Early in 2007 Tristan Courtney-Prior joined the band as a second guitarist.

In June 2007, Peabody recorded their third album, Prospero, again produced by Hutchings. The first single, "The Devil For Sympathy", was released in September that year, followed by the album in October 2008.

In May 2010, Peabody's self-produced fourth album, Loose Manifesto, was recorded by Tim Kevin and released on the band's own label Peabrain Recordings through MGM Distribution in October 2010.

Peabody released a split 7-inch single ("All the bad girls") with local band Machine Machine, in late 2011. The band started recording its fifth studio album in January 2017.

== Discography ==
=== Albums ===
- Professional Againster, September 2003
- The New Violence, May 2005
- Prospero, October 2008
- Loose Manifesto, October 2010
- A Redder Shade of Rust, October 2018

=== EPs ===
- Hi-Cycle, April 1997
- Rock, Girls and Computers, October 2000
- Stupid Boy, 2002
- Got You on My Radar, October 2004
- The Devil For Sympathy, September 2007
