= Claremont Road (disambiguation) =

The Claremont Road Ground was a former football ground in Cricklewood, UK

Claremont Road may also refer to:

- Claremont Road Cricket Ground, cricket ground in Dublin, Ireland
- Claremont Road District, district formerly called Claremont Road in Perth, Australia
- Claremont Road, Leytonstone, demolished street in Leytonstone, London, UK
