= Spastique =

Studio album by Magic Lunchbox
- Released: 2005
- Recorded: 2004/2005
- Genre: Alternative rock
- Label: Nonzero
- Producer: Tom Kazas, Scott Saunders

Magic Lunchbox chronology
What Time Is the Orgy? (2001)	Spastique (2005)

Spastique is the fourth major release and third full-length album by Magic Lunchbox. The title is supposedly a reference to an infamous nightclub in west Paris.

The closing track "Fashanu" is possibly the only known song dedicated to English Premier League footballer John Fashanu, and the match-fixing scandal involving him, Bruce Grobbelaar and Hans Segers.

== Track listing ==
All songs written by Magic Lunchbox.

1. "Dreaming is Over"
2. "New Shoes"
3. "Taking a Chance"
4. "Doin' Alright"
5. "Gay Tennis Coach"
6. "Fix My Mo'"
7. "Song For Greg"
8. "I Can See"
9. "Fashanu"

== Personnel ==
- Ernie Luney - vocals, guitar, keyboard
- Danny Nighttime - guitar, backing vocals
- Rob Child - bass, guitar
- Damian Kukulj - drums, V-Drums
- Lauren Freedom - vocals
