= Deal or No Deal Nigeria =

- Genre: Game show
- Based on: Deal or No Deal by John de Mol Jr.
- Presented by: John Fashanu
- Country of origin: Nigeria
- Original language: English
- No. of seasons: 1

Production
- Production company: Endemol

Original release
- Network: M-Net Africa
- Release: July 7 – December 29, 2007

Deal or No Deal Nigeria was the Nigerian adaptation of the international game show format Deal or No Deal. It aired on M-Net Africa on Saturdays at 18:00. The first series started on July 7, 2007, and finished on December 29, 2007. One-time Football player and TV presenter John Fashanu was the host. As in many other versions, models hold 26 cases, with values going up to US$100,000.

== Case Values ==
$0.01
$1
$5
$10
$25
$50
$75
$100
$200
$300
$400
$500
$750

$1,000
$2,500
$5,000
$7,500
$10,000
$12,500
$15,000
$20,000
$30,000
$40,000
$50,000
$75,000
$100,000

== International Broadcasts ==
Deal or No Deal Nigeria was previously aired on UK station The Africa Channel.
