= Matt Richardson =

British comedian and television presenter

- Richardson in 2015
- Born: Matthew Jeffrey Richardson; 28 May 1991 (age 35); Didcot, Oxfordshire, England
- Notable work: The Xtra Factor (2013); Viral Tap (2014); Celebrity Haunted Hotel Live (2016); Celebrity Haunted Mansion (2018); The Hangover Games (2019); Dancing on Ice (2021)
- Spouse: Sam Rollinson

Comedy career
- Medium: Stand-up; television
- Website: www.mattrichardsoncomedy.co.uk

Matthew Jeffrey Richardson (born 28 May 1991) is an English comedian and broadcaster, known as a co-presenter on the ITV2 spin-off show The Xtra Factor with Caroline Flack in 2013. In 2016, Richardson became the drive time presenter on the digital radio station Virgin Radio UK. Richardson has also co-presented Celebrity Haunted Hotel Live and Celebrity Haunted Mansion with Christine Lampard on UKTV's W channel, and he competed in the thirteenth series of Dancing on Ice, as a replacement for Rufus Hound and was the 3rd contestant to be eliminated.

== Early life ==
Richardson grew up in the South Oxfordshire town of Didcot and has performed at the Cornerstone Arts Centre in the town.

== Career ==
=== Comedy ===
Richardson began doing stand-up from the age of 18, with his debut performances being in November of 2009. He appeared in the finals of So You Think You're Funny and the Chortle Student Comedian of the Year in 2010. Richardson's first solo show, Hometown Hero, won Best New Show at the 2012 Leicester Comedy Festival and was taken on a 54 date national tour from September 2013 to June 2014. His second show, Slash, debuted at the Edinburgh Festival Fringe in 2017 before going on a UK Tour in Autumn 2017. After a run at the 2019 Edinburgh Fringe Festival he went on tour with his show, Impostor, in early 2020.

=== Television and radio ===
In 2013, Richardson replaced Olly Murs as co-presenter of the ITV2 spin-off show The Xtra Factor with Caroline Flack, airing immediately after the main ITV show. On 4 June, both Richardson and Flack announced that they would not return for The Xtra Factor for series 11. Richardson was also a regular panelist and presenter on Channel 5's Big Brother spin-off show Big Brother's Bit on the Side. In 2014, Richardson was a regular panelist on the ITV2 panel show Viral Tap presented by Caroline Flack.

In 2016, Richardson became the drive time presenter on the digital radio station Virgin Radio UK. In 2018 his show on Virgin was nominated for a Radio Academy Award for Funniest Show He left Virgin Radio on 2 August 2019. In October 2016, Richardson co-presented Celebrity Haunted Hotel Live on the W channel, alongside Christine Lampard and Jamie East. He also presented the spin-off show Celebrity Haunted Hotel: Do Not Disturb. On 29 May 2017, Richardson presented the final episode of Just Tattoo of Us: The Aftermath. In February 2018, Richardson co-presented Celebrity Haunted Mansion on UKTV's W channel with Christine Lampard. He also presented its spin-off show Celebrity Haunted Mansion: High Spirits.

On 13 May 2020, he launched When No One’s Watching, a podcast he co-hosts with Matt Willis. Guests have included, Ricky Wilson, Tom Fletcher, and Keith Lemon. On 3 February 2021, it was announced that Richardson would be a contestant on the thirteenth series of Dancing on Ice, as a replacement for Rufus Hound who had been forced to withdraw from the competition after testing positive for COVID-19. Richardson was paired with Vicky Ogden and joined the show in week 4, however was eliminated in the same week.

From March to October 2023, Richardson presented the breakfast show on Jack FM, a radio station in Oxfordshire, where he replaced Iain Lee.

== Filmography ==
Television

| Year | Title | Role | Channel | Notes |
|---|---|---|---|---|
| 2013 | The Xtra Factor | Co-presenter | ITV2 | With Caroline Flack |
| 2014 | Viral Tap | Regular panellist | ITV2 | |
| 2015 | Big Brother's Bit on the Side | Regular panellist | Channel 5 | |
| 2016 | Pampered Pooches: Hollywood | Presenter | ITV2 | Filmed in Los Angeles |
| 2016 | Meet the Family Guys | Presenter | ITV2 | Filmed in Los Angeles |
| 2016 | Celebrity Haunted Hotel Live | Co-presenter | W | With Christine Lampard and Jamie East |
| 2016 | Celebrity Haunted Hotel: Do Not Disturb | Presenter | W | Spin-off show |
| 2017 | Just Tattoo of Us: The Aftermath | Presenter | MTV | 1 episode |
| 2018 | Celebrity Haunted Mansion | Co-presenter | W | With Christine Lampard |
| 2018 | Celebrity Haunted Mansion: High Spirits | Presenter | W | Spin-off show |
| 2019 | The Hangover Games | Presenter | E4 | With Ken Cheng |
| 2021 | Dancing on Ice | Contestant | ITV | Third contestant to be eliminated |
| 2023 | Celebrity Mastermind | Contestant | BBC1 | Second place |

Guest appearances

- Sweat the Small Stuff (11 June, 15 October 2013)
- Big Brother's Bit on the Side (25 June 2013, 26 August 2013, 2015 (as semi-regular panelist))
- Sunday Brunch (6 October 2013)
- Never Mind the Buzzcocks (14 October 2013)
- Celebrity Juice (24 October 2013)
- Fake Reaction (27 February 2014)
- Big Brother's Bit on the Side (4 September 2014)
- The Feeling Nuts Comedy Night (24 October 2014)
- Drunk History (23 March 2016)
- Up Late with Rylan (25 May 2016)
- It's Not Me, It's You (7 & 29 July 2016)
- Len Goodman's Partners in Rhyme (19 August 2017)
- The Chase: Celebrity Special (24 December 2017)
- Top Gear: Extra Gear (11 March 2018)
- The Chris Ramsey Show (14 March 2018)
- Westworld: The Story So Far (31 March 2018)
- Love Island: Aftersun (22 July 2018)

== Awards ==
| Year | Group | Award | Result | Reference |
|---|---|---|---|---|
| 2010 | Newbury Comedy Festival | New Act of the Year | Won | |
| 2010 | So You Think You're Funny | | Nominated | |
| 2010 | Chortle Student Comedian of the Year | | Nominated | |
| 2010 | Reading Comedy Festival | New Act of the Year | Nominated | |
| 2011 | Bath Comedy Festival | New Act of the Year | Won | |
| 2011 | Latitude Festival | New Act of the Year | Nominated | |
| 2012 | Leicester Comedy Festival | Best New Show | Won | |
| 2018 | Radio Academy Awards | Funniest Show | Nominated | |
