= Bluebottle Kiss =

Australian indie rock band

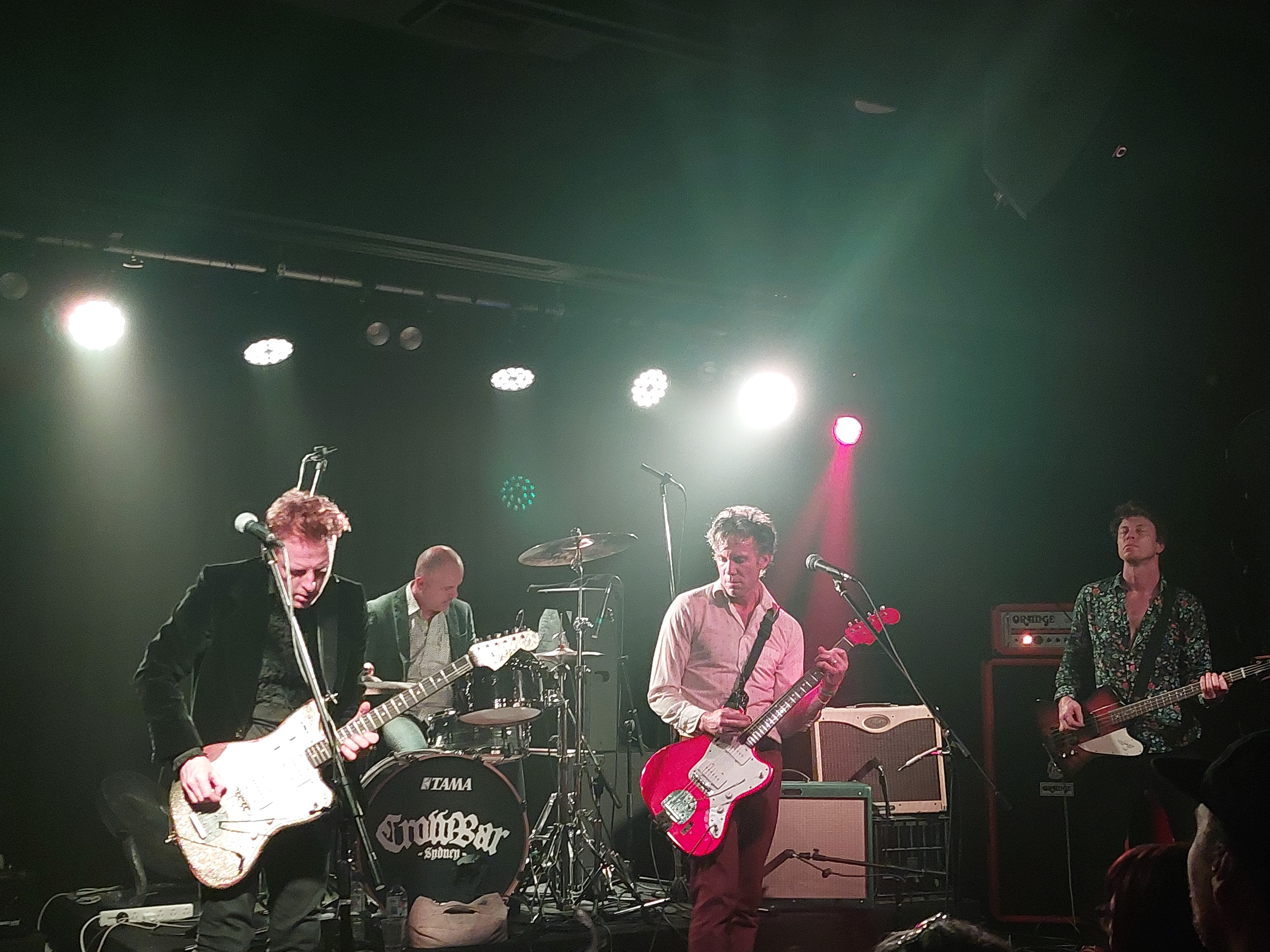
- Performing at the Crowbar, Sydney, October 2022. L-R Ben Fletcher, Richard Coneliano, Jamie Hutchings, Ben Grounds.

Background information
- Origin: Sydney, New South Wales, Australia
- Genres: Rock; alternative rock; grunge; indie rock
- Years active: 1993–2007, 2022–present
- Labels: Murmur/Sony; Nonzero
- Members: Jamie Hutchings; Ben Fletcher; Richard Coneliano; Ben Grounds
- Past members: Simon Adams; Sian Williams; John James; Peter Noble; Simon Fuhrer; Ross Dickie; Jared Harrison
- Website: bluebottlekiss.com

Bluebottle Kiss, sometimes seen as BBK, are an Australian indie rock band formed in 1993 by mainstay member Jamie Hutchings on guitar and vocals. Other long-term members are Ben Fletcher on vocals, guitar and bass guitar, and Ben Grounds on bass guitar and guitar. The band issued six studio albums, Higher Up the Firetrails (1995), Fear of Girls (1996), Patient (1999), Revenge Is Slow (2002), Come Across (2003) and Doubt Seeds (2006). Revenge is Slow reached the ARIA albums chart top 100. Bluebottle Kiss disbanded in 2007 and reformed in 2022.

== History ==
Bluebottle Kiss were formed in Sydney in early 1993 as a grunge trio by Simon Adams on drums, Jamie Hutchings on lead guitar and lead vocals and Sian Williams on bass guitar. According to Hutchings the group's name combines Portuguese man o' war, commonly known as bluebottle jellyfish together with Barbed Wire Kisses (1988) – an album by Scottish group the Jesus and Mary Chain. Ben Fletcher replaced Williams on bass guitar and backing vocals later in 1993.

Bluebottle Kiss' influences are from the late 1980s United States indie scene, which include Sonic Youth and the Afghan Whigs, singer-songwriters of the 1970s, Neil Young and Van Morrison, as well as the Australian independent scene with the Church and Nick Cave and the Bad Seeds. AllMusic's James Christopher Monger described their sound, as "atmospheric power pop in the vein of Nick Cave, Coldplay, and Brendan Benson." John James on guitar and backing vocals briefly joined in 1994. Sonic Elevator Music for the Masses (1994), their first extended play (EP), was issued independently as a five-track cassette tape. In 1995 Hutchings and Fletcher were joined by Peter Noble on drums as a three-piece band.

One-and-a-half years after forming, the band were signed to Murmur, an imprint of Sony Music Australia. Their debut studio album, Higher Up the Firetrails, was issued in April 1995. It was recorded at the Bondi Pavilion Theatre with Wayne Connolly producing (Underground Lovers, You Am I). All ten tracks were written by Hutchings. Australian musicologist, Ian McFarlane, noticed they did not use a "sterile" studio setting, but used a theatre "to capture a certain ambience. The album ran the gamut of sounds from quiet dirge to chaotic noise." They supported shows by Beck, JSBX, Crow and Silverchair.

For the group's second album, Fear of Girls (August 1996), they used US producer, Jack Endino (Nirvana, Mudhoney, Afghan Whigs). McFarlane opined "[it] covered a lot of ground, from tough, noisy art-rock to bleak ballads." Sajade of Woroni enthused about its "rich and sensuous, yet at the same time, groovy and rocking tracks". A reviewer at ideal.net.au declared, "an outstanding album from a band in definite progress. It's dark stormy night stuff, angst, frustration, disappointment, frailty." Late in 1997 Noble was replaced on drums by Richard Coneliano.

Although dropped from Murmur after the release of their five-track EP, Somnambulist Homesick Blues in 1997, Bluebottle Kiss continued to make records on their own with various indie imprints. In 1998 another EP, Tap Dancing on the Titanic was issued on the now-dormant Troy Horse label. Jasper Lee of Oz Music Project observed, "[it] features songs of a much more stripped back tone, gaining mostly support and praise from it's [sic] loyal fanbase." In May 1999 their next studio album, Patient was released via Citadel Records, whose roster includes New Christs, Died Pretty, the Stems and Knievel. Hutchings had taken up production duties and recorded Patient in four days. It is named for his hospitalisation after a sporting accident. Greg Lawrence of WHAMMO declared, "[it] hones the band's emotion and angst and draws wonderful attention to the songwriting cleverness of [Hutchings]." SoulShine's writer observed, "[which] delivered some of the most ferocious and most tender Bluebottle Kiss moments to date".

The band briefly moved to the US after this before regrouping as four-piece in 2001. In 2002, a long-time music fan, Nick Carr - inspired by labels such as Citadel - started his own label, Nonzero Records, to release Bluebottle Kiss' studio album, Revenge is Slow (March 2002). It reached the ARIA albums chart top 100. The album was also released in the US on the In Music We Trust label. Charles Spano of AllMusic rated it at four stars and explained, "[it] may not be an entirely consistent album, but when at its best, Bluebottle Kiss is unstoppable, layering noise, feedback, and jangles over a core of power pop." Lawrence found "[they] have created the kind of meisterwerk that only comes around once or twice in the lifetime of a great band. Their hybrid of strong dynamics, subtle experimentation and an ever-present classic sense of melody has seen [them] gain a highly loyal following in Australia." In November of that year, Triple J's Richard Kingsmill presented a music special, "Bluebottle Kiss", for their J Files series to showcase the band's output.

During 2002 Coneliano left the group; he was replaced on drums by Simon Fuhrer in 2003. Come Across (2003) their fifth studio album, was named Featured Album in November by Australian music journalist, Ed Nimmervoll. It contains "slow brooding blues rock songs, big building rockers, amazing variety from song to song, using piano one some tracks, harmony vocals elsewhere, acoustic guitars on another song. All round it's a really strong performance from everyone." AllMusic's Hal Horowitz rated it at four stars, with its "challenging, rugged, dramatic rock with folk tendencies woven intricately into its coarse fabric. Best digested whole where the dramatic songs build on and off each other". Ross Dickie on bass guitar and Jared Harrison on drums replaced Fletcher and Fuhrer, respectively. The relationship between Bluebottle Kiss and Nonzero Records has endured, with the band's sixth studio album - the double album Doubt Seeds - being their third on that label, among numerous singles and EPs. Doubt Seeds was produced by Hutchings at Linear Recording studio in Sydney. The band separated in 2007, with Hutchings pursuing a solo career.

The band reformed by July 2022 with the Revenge Is Slow-era line-up of Coneliano, Fletcher, Grounds and Hutchings. They toured Australia with five shows in October 2022 to support the reissue of Patient on vinyl. Filmmaker Ben deHoedt shot their performance at Sydney's Crowbar for their reunion gig on 22 October. It was issued in May 2024 both as a feature-length documentary film, Bluebottle Kiss: Never Leave Town - Live in Sydney and as a live album of the same title. It provided a single, "Outside Are the Dogs" (July). In October–November they undertook a joint tour with Screamfeeder. On the tour Bluebottle Kiss promoted the re-release of Fear of Girls (July 2024) on vinyl via Perth's Love as Fiction Records. In 2026 the band performed an eight-date tour supporting a vinyl reissue of Revenge Is Slow.

== Members ==
Current members

- Jamie Hutchings – lead vocals, lead guitar, keyboards (1993–2007, 2022–present)
- Ben Fletcher – vocals, guitar, bass guitar (1993–2004, 2022–present)
- Richard Coneliano – drums, piano (1997–2002, 2022–present)
- Ben Grounds – bass guitar, guitar (2001–2007, 2022–present)

Former members

- Simon Adams – drums (1993–1994)
- Sian Williams – bass guitar (1993)
- John James – guitar, backing vocals (fl. 1994)
- Peter Noble – drums (1994–1997)
- Simon Fuhrer – drums (2003–2004)
- Ross Dickie – bass guitar (2004–2007)
- Jared Harrison – drums (2004–2007)

== Discography ==
=== Studio albums ===
List of albums, with Australian chart positions
Title	Album details	Peak chart positions
Title	Album details	AUS
Higher Up the Firetrails	Released: April 1995; Format: CD; Label: Murmur/Sony Music Australia (MATTCD006)	–
Fear of Girls	Released: 1996; Format: CD; Label: Murmur/Sony Music Australia (MATTCD037)	–
Patient	Released: May 1999; Format: CD; Label: Sponge Worthy Records (sprc-0005)	–
Revenge is Slow	Released: March 2002; Format: CD; Label: Nonzero/Shock (NZ001)	63
Come Across	Released: 2003; Format: CD; Label: Nonzero/Shock (NZ010)	– (Note: Come Across did not enter ARIA albums chart but peaked at number 8 on the ARIA Hitseekers albums chart.)
Doubt Seeds	Released: 2006; Format: 2xCD; Label: Nonzero/Shock (NZ037)	– (Note: Doubt Seeds did not enter ARIA albums chart but peaked at number 10 on the ARIA Hitseekers albums chart.)

=== Live albums ===
- Bluebottle Kiss: Never Leave Town - Live in Sydney (17 May 2024) – Love as Fiction Records

=== Extended plays ===
- Sonic Elevator Music for the Masses (1994) – Independent
- Double Yellow Tarred (1995) – Murmur/Sony Music Australia (MATTCD019)
- Helping You Hate Me (November 1996) – Murmur
- Somnambulist Homesick Blues (1997) – Murmur (MATTCD054, MATTV054)
- Tap Dancing on the Titanic (February 1998) – Troy Horse/MDS (MDSTH018)
- Girl Genius (May 1999) – Citadel
- Gangsterland (August 2001) – Nonzero/Shock (XHBT002) ARIA Alternative singles: No. 23 (Note: Gangsterland did not enter ARIA singles chart but peaked at number 23 on the ARIA Alternative singles chart.)
- Last Playboy in Town (21 June 2004) – Nonzero/Shock (NZ016)

=== Singles ===
- "Rust and the Time" (1996)
- "Return to the City of Folded Arms" (1999)
- "Ounce of Your Cruelty" (2001)
- "Father's Hands" (2004)
- "A Little Bit of Light" (2005) ARIA Hitseekers singles: No. 12 (Note: "A Little Bit of Light" did not enter ARIA singles chart but peaked at number 12 on the ARIA Hitseekers singles chart.)
- "The Women are an Army" (2006)
- "Outside Are the Dogs" (live) (2024)
