= Viral Tap =

- Genre: Comedy panel game
- Created by: Vision Independent Productions
- Written by: Stephen Parry
- Directed by: Ashley S. Gorman
- Presented by: Caroline Flack
- Starring: Regular Panellists: Matt Richardson; Carly Smallman
- Theme music composer: Vinylizor
- Country of origin: United Kingdom
- Original language: English
- No. of series: 1
- No. of episodes: 8

Production
- Executive producer: Robert Gray
- Producer: Sarah Pack
- Production location: The Hospital Club
- Editor: David Frisby
- Running time: 50 minutes (inc. adverts)
- Production company: Yalli Productions

Original release
- Network: ITV2
- Release: 27 April – 15 June 2014

Viral Tap is a British television comedy panel game shown on ITV2 which ran from 27 April to 15 June 2014. The show is presented by Caroline Flack and stars regular panellists Matt Richardson, Carly Smallman and Jim Chapman as a side show presenter.

The show features viewers sending in viral videos which could earn them either £250, £500 or £1,000.

== Episodes ==
Episode no.	Original air date	Guest panelists
1	27 April 2014	Joey Essex, Joel Dommett
2	4 May 2014	Charlotte Crosby
3	11 May 2014	David Morgan, Jamie Laing
4	18 May 2014	Joel Dommett, Ashley Roberts
5	25 May 2014	London Hughes, Tinchy Stryder
6	1 June 2014	Rick Edwards, Millie Mackintosh
7	8 June 2014	Jameela Jamil
8	15 June 2014	Louis Smith
