= Fash FC =

- Presented by: Caroline Flack; John Fashanu
- Country of origin: United Kingdom

Production
- Running time: 30 minutes

Original release
- Network: Bravo
- Release: September 2003 – May 2004

Fash FC
- Full name: Fash Football Club
- Nickname: Fash FC
- Founded: 2003
- Dissolved: 2004
- Ground: Claremont Road, Hendon
- Capacity: 3,000
- Chairman: Roy Agyemang (Producer)
- Manager: John Fashanu
- League: Hendon Sunday Premier League
Home colours

Fash FC, sometimes styled as Football Challenge was a British weekly reality sports documentary, showing John Fashanu the ex-professional footballer as he went back to the grassroots of football, managing a team of amateur players in a Sunday League. The show was launched in September 2003, and was broadcast throughout the 2003–2004 football season on Bravo. The show received a re-run on Loaded TV, the Sky satellite platform Channel 200 and online.

== Overview ==
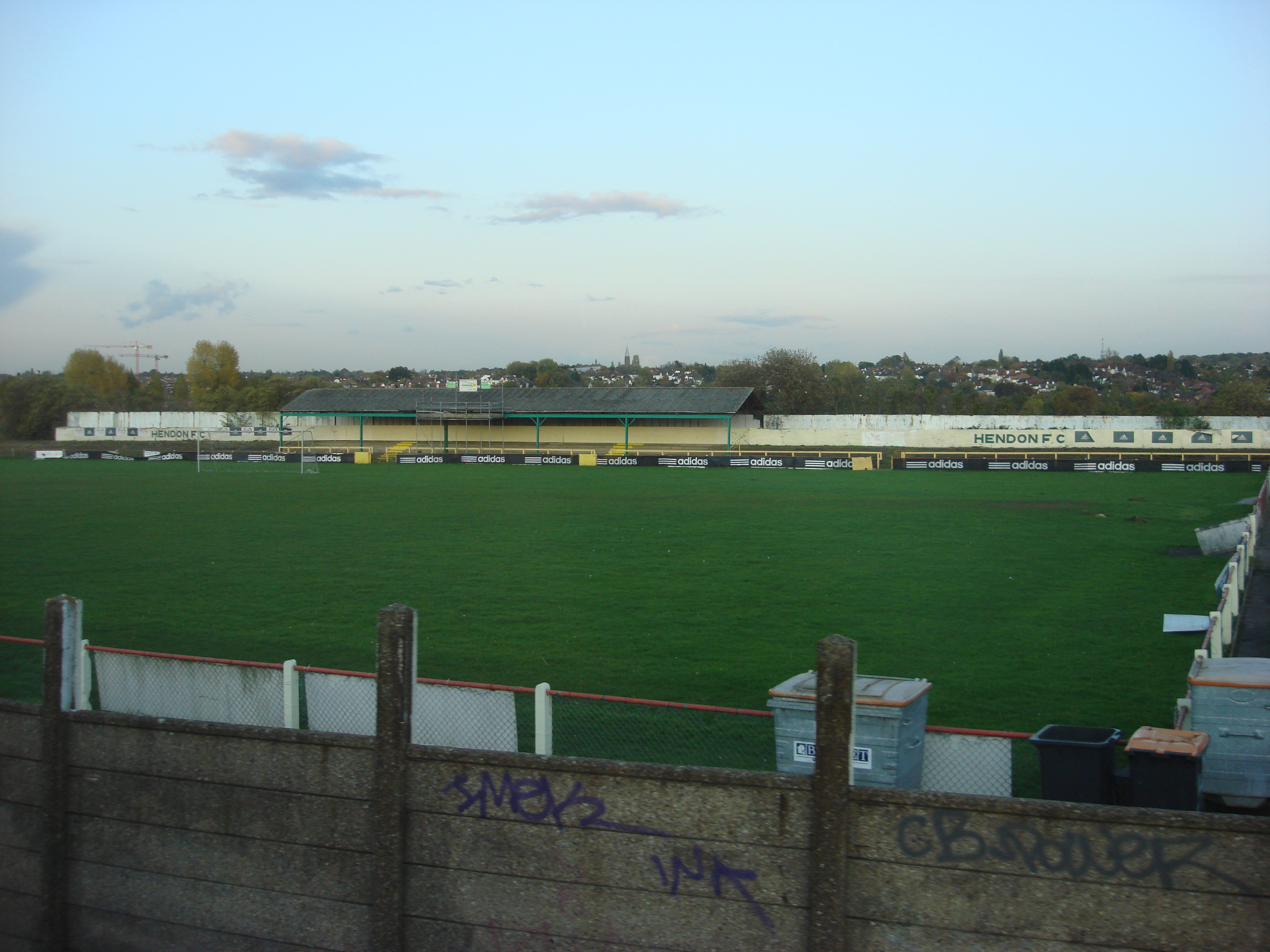
Claremont Road

Fash FC competed in the 2003–2004 Hendon Sunday Premier League in London, they played their home games at Claremont Road, the former home of Hendon Football Club.

For the show, Fash FC played in the suburb of Cricklewood, within the London Borough of Barnet, at a ground simply known by the local road name, Claremont Road. The ground was owned by Hendon Football Club.

== Show staff ==
Name	Role
(England) John Fashanu	Manager
(England) Glynn "Mace" Mason	Assistant manager
(England) Caroline Flack	Presenter
(England) Andy Goldstein	Commentator
(England) Andy Burton	Commentator

== Results ==
=== Hendon & District Sunday League Division One ===
Complete League results for Fash FC during the 2003–04 season.

5 October 2003 1	Fash FC	0–4	St. Andrews	Hendon
				Stadium: Claremont Road

12 October 2003 2	Fash FC	3–3	Highgate Albion	Hendon
	Amerdee, Diamond, Spanyol			Stadium: Claremont Road

19 October 2003 3	Fash FC	0–3	Golborne	Hendon
				Stadium: Claremont Road

26 October 2003 4	Oakpark FC	1–1	Fash FC	Hendon
			McCarthy

9 November 2003 5	Fash FC	6–0	Kosova	Hendon
	Amerdee (2), Diamond, Hermosa, Parara (2)			Stadium: Claremont Road

16 November 2003 6	Little House FC	1–1	Fash FC	Hendon
				Stadium: Phillips

30 November 2003 7	Kings United	1–6	Fash FC	Hendon
			Amerdee, Diamond (3), Hermosa, Own Goal

18 January 2004 8	Hendon Town	1–1	Fash FC	Hendon
			Hinchcliffe

9 February 2004 9	Golborne	Forfeit	Fash FC	Hendon

15 February 2004 10	Kosova	1–2	Fash FC	Hendon

29 February 2004 11	Fash FC	2–1	Hendon Town	Hendon
				Stadium: Claremont Road

7 March 2004 12	Highgate Albion	0–0	Fash FC	Hendon

14 March 2004 13	Fash FC	1–0	Oakpark FC	Hendon
				Stadium: Claremont Road

21 March 2004 14	Fash FC	1–1	Kings United	Hendon
				Stadium: Claremont Road

21 March 2004 15	St Andrews	1–0	Fash FC	Hendon

4 April 2004 16	Fash FC	3–4	Little House FC	Hendon
				Stadium: Claremont Road

=== Middlesex County FA Sunday Premier Cup ===
Complete Middlesex Cup results for Fash FC during the 2003–04 season

2 November 2003 1	Fash FC	6–3	Linton	Hendon
				Stadium: Claremont Road

7 December 2003 2	Fash FC	5–3	Bedfont Sunday (CHIS)	Hendon
				Stadium: Claremont Road

8 February 2004 3	Fash FC	3–3 (4–3 p)	Enfield Rangers Old Boys	Hendon
				Stadium: Claremont Road

22 February 2004 Semi-final	Kings United	3–0	Fash FC	Hendon

=== Reg Ellis Cup ===
Complete Reg Ellis Cup results for Fash FC during the 2003–04 season

11 January 2004 1	Fash FC	6–1	Oakpark FC	Hendon
				Stadium: Claremont Road

13 March 2004 2	KSC FC	Forfeit	Fash FC	Hendon

=== Challenge Cup ===
Complete Challenge Cup results for Fash FC during the 2003–04 season

12 March 2004 1	Fash FC	Forfeit	St Andrews	Hendon

== League Table ==
Final standings.

Pos	Team	Pld	W	D	L	F	A	GD	Pts
1	Kings United	16	10	3	3	30	17	+13	33
2	St Andrews	16	10	3	3	33	21	+12	33
3	Little House FC	16	9	4	3	47	30	+7	31
4	Fash FC	16	6	6	4	28	23	+5	24
5	Highgate Albion	16	5	4	7	29	36	-7	19
6	Oakpark FC	16	5	3	8	13	28	-15	18
7	Golborne	16	5	1	10	26	11	+15	16
8	Kosova	16	5	2	9	9	23	-46	16
9	Hendon Town	16	2	4	10	24	41	-17	10

== Notable players ==
- Warren Waugh

== Notes ==
1. The IMDb page for the TV show "Football Challenge" on their website, this is incorrect and the show was actually called "Fash FC".
