= Warren Waugh =

English footballer

Personal information
- Full name: Warren Waugh
- Date of birth: 9 October 1980 (age 46)
- Place of birth: Harlesden, England
- Height: 6 ft 2 in (1.88 m)
- Position: Forward

Youth career
- –1999: Exeter City

Senior career*
Years	Team	Apps	(Gls)
1999–2000	Exeter City	10	(0)
2000–2001	Cambridge City		
2001–2002	Crawley Town		
2002–2003	Enfield Town		
2003	Tooting & Mitcham United		
2004	Metropolitan Police		
2005	Carshalton Athletic		
2006	Ramsgate		
2007–2008	Hillingdon Borough		
2008–2009	Caernarfon Town	12	(4)
- * Club domestic league appearances and goals

Warren Waugh (born 9 October 1980) is an English former professional footballer who played as a forward. He played professionally for English club Exeter City before dropping into non-league football.

== Career ==
On 5 January 1999, Waugh made his debut for Exeter City as a substitute in a 3–1 win over Southend United in an EFL Trophy match. He then made his league debut four days later as an 86th minute substitute in a 4–0 win over Swansea City in a Football League Third Division match.

He then played in non-league football for the likes of Cambridge City, Crawley Town and in Wales for Caernarfon Town.

He was also part of the Fash FC squad during the 2003–04 season for the television program Fashanu's Football Challenge.
