= John Fashanu =

English footballer (born 1962)

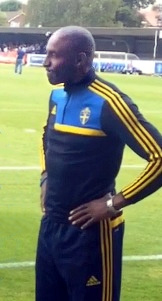
- Fashanu in 2014

Personal information
- Full name: John Winton Fashanu
- Date of birth: 18 September 1962 (age 64)
- Place of birth: Kensington, London, England
- Height: 6 ft 1 in (1.85 m)
- Position: Striker

Youth career
- Norwich City

Senior career*
Years	Team	Apps	(Gls)
1978–1983	Norwich City	7	(1)
1982	→ Miramar Rangers (loan)	11	(15)
1983	→ Crystal Palace (loan)	1	(0)
1983–1984	Lincoln City	36	(11)
1984–1986	Millwall	50	(12)
1986–1994	Wimbledon	276	(107)
1994–1995	Aston Villa	13	(3)
Total		394	(149)

International career
1989	England	2	(0)
- * Club domestic league appearances and goals

John Winton Fashanu (born 18 September 1962) is an English television presenter and former professional footballer.

As a footballer he was a centre-forward from 1978 until 1995, most notably in an eight-year spell at Wimbledon in which he won the FA Cup in 1988 and scored over 100 goals in all competitions. He also played in the earlier years of the Premier League for Wimbledon and later for Aston Villa. He also featured in the Football League for Norwich City, Lincoln City, Crystal Palace and Millwall, as well as a brief loan spell in New Zealand with Miramar Rangers. He was capped twice at senior level by England. He scored 134 league goals in a career lasting 17 years, retiring at the end of the 1994–95 season.

Following his football career, he moved into television presenting and went on to co-host popular British television show Gladiators in the 1990s, and between 2003 and 2004 he managed his own Sunday league football side Fash FC which featured on Bravo. He has also previously presented Deal or No Deal Nigeria and has notably appeared as a contestant on I'm a Celebrity... Get Me out of Here! and Dancing on Ice.

== Early life ==
Fashanu was born in Kensington, London, the son of Pearl Gopal, a nurse from British Guiana and Patrick Fashanu, a Nigerian barrister living in the UK. When his parents split up he was sent, together with his older brother Justin, to a Barnardo's care home. When he was five, he and his brother were fostered by Alf and Betty Jackson and were subsequently brought up in Shropham near Attleborough, Norfolk.

== Football career ==
=== Early career ===
Fashanu's footballing career began as an apprentice at Norwich City in 1979, and he turned professional two years later – just as his elder brother Justin was transferred to Nottingham Forest from the relegated Carrow Road club.

Norwich were promoted straight back to the First Division in 1981–82, but Fashanu managed just five league appearances and scored once. He managed two appearances in the 1982–83 First Division campaign – which would be his last for the club. He was never a regular player at Carrow Road.

He had a brief loan spell with Crystal Palace from Norwich. He also played in the English off-season in New Zealand with Miramar Rangers, and made an appearance in the final of the local equivalent of the FA Cup, the Chatham Cup (he remains the only player to have played in the final of both the English and New Zealand major cup

He joined Lincoln City on a free transfer on 23 September 1983, when they were in the Third Division. He scored seven goals from 26 league games that season, and managed four from 10 league games the following campaign before his £55,000 transfer to Third Division promotion challengers Millwall on 30 November 1984. In his first season at The Den Fashanu scored four goals in 25 games helping the Lions reach the FA Cup quarter-finals (where they lost at Luton Town in a game marred by fans who invaded the pitch) and secure promotion to the Second Division. He managed eight goals from 25 games in 1985–86, before leaving to join Wimbledon towards the end of the Second Division season.

=== Wimbledon ===
Fashanu made a £125,000 move to Second Division promotion contenders Wimbledon in March 1986, when they were pushing for a third promotion in four seasons as they looked to complete a rapid rise from the Fourth Division to the First. At the time, he was the club's record signing.

Immediately becoming a regular starter, Fashanu's four goals from the remaining nine league games helped Wimbledon seal the final promotion place and they became a First Division side a mere nine years after being elected to the Football League - and also became only the second club in Football League history to be promoted three divisions in four seasons.

Fashanu and his colleagues quickly settled well into the First Division, surprising all the observers by finishing sixth in the league (briefly topping the table in early September) and finishing above traditionally much bigger clubs including Nottingham Forest and Manchester United. Fashanu was Wimbledon's top scorer with 11 league goals that season, and would be a regular goalscorer in the top flight for the Dons for a further seven seasons.

In 1988, Fashanu helped Wimbledon win the FA Cup, beating Liverpool in a final that was billed as a "rags versus riches" affair, although the two clubs were separated by just six places in the First Division - as Liverpool had been the dominant side in English football for some 15 years whereas Wimbledon had played just two seasons in the First Division and only 11 as a Football League club. He performed well in the league again, scoring 14 goals.

He also scored Wimbledon's goal as Liverpool defeated them 2–1 in that year's Charity Shield. Fashanu claimed two England caps – against Chile and Scotland in a friendly tournament in May 1989, but did not score.

During his time at Wimbledon, Fashanu scored 126 goals. His best season was 1990–91, when he was the First Division's joint third highest scorer with 20 goals as his side finished seventh.

He received criticism during the 1993–94 season when a clash with Gary Mabbutt, then Spurs captain, in an aerial challenge left the Spurs defender with a broken skull and eye socket. Fashanu had already established a reputation by that point of being a very aggressive and physical striker, and this was seen as another example of that behaviour. With the likes of Vinnie Jones and Dennis Wise, he was one of the "Crazy Gang" which had built up a reputation for this style of aggressive, no nonsense play.

=== Aston Villa ===
On 4 August 1994, just before the start of the 1994–95 season, Fashanu was sold to Aston Villa for £1.35million. However, injury restricted him to just 13 games and three goals for a Villa side who narrowly avoided relegation that season. He managed a goal on his Villa debut when they drew 2–2 at Everton on the opening day of the Premier League season, his other two goals coming in successive games against Queens Park Rangers and then Nottingham Forest in January.

Fashanu's last game was on 4 February 1995 away at Manchester United in a Premiership game that they lost 1–0. In a tackle with Ryan Giggs he snapped his knee ligaments and was stretchered off. After the end of the season, Fashanu retired as a result of this injury.

In 1995, he hit the front pages as well as the back when The Sun published allegations of match fixing against Fashanu, fellow Wimbledon player Hans Segers and Liverpool goalkeeper Bruce Grobbelaar. All three players were eventually cleared of the allegations in a subsequent court case in August 1997.

== International career ==
Fashanu represented England at full International level gaining two caps – against Chile and Scotland in the 1989 Rous Cup, due to his good form at club level for his then club Wimbledon. He was also eligible to play for Nigeria and since retiring he has expressed regret in not being able to do so.

== Post-football career ==
Following retirement from the game through injury, Fashanu became a television presenter. He presented the UK edition of Gladiators alongside Ulrika Jonsson for six seasons in the 1990s. Fashanu became associated with the catchphrase "Awooga".

In 2003, he came second in the second series of I'm a Celebrity... Get Me out of Here!. Later that year he presented Fash's Football Challenge, a reality television show that followed Fashanu managing an amateur football team. Also in 2003, he fronted a six-part series for ITV1 based on the American format Man vs. Beast; however, following protests from animal rights groups, the series was never broadcast. He also released a video "Focus on Fitness with Fash". In 2007 he was the host of Deal or No Deal Nigeria, airing on M-Net Africa.

Since retirement Fashanu has also maintained his sporting connections, becoming involved with the Nigeria Football Association, and as chairman of Welsh football team Barry Town for one year, vacating this post in 2003.

In 2000, he also compiled, all with an investigator, a report on corruption in Nigeria in the 1980s and 1990s that came to be known as the Fashanu Report. In 2003, he became the manager of his own Sunday league football team Fash FC as part of a television reality show.^{1}

In September 2005 Wimbledon Old Players' Association was launched. John is involved in the Wimbledon Old Players' Association, an organisation set up by the Wimbledon Independent Supporters Association. He said: "It's going to be great to be back as part of the Wimbledon family. As an ex-Wimbledon player, I know all about the heroics of the likes of Roy Law and Dickie Guy in the old days, as well as what the new boys have been doing at AFC Wimbledon".

In 2007, The Times named him 22nd out of the 50 worst footballers to have played in the Premier League.

In August 2009, Fashanu, who in 2000 accused Bob Minton and Ibrahim Babangida of stealing money from Nigeria, apologised saying, "I can say it again and again, that there was nothing like debt buy-back or any billions stacked away in any account anywhere." Minton said that Fashanu was given false information by the Church of Scientology to attack him.

In January 2023, Fashanu was a contestant on the fifteenth series of Dancing on Ice. He was paired with Alexandra Schauman and was first to be eliminated.

== Personal life ==
Fashanu, who was the younger brother of Justin Fashanu, disowned his brother after the latter came out as gay, telling The Voice that Justin was "an outcast". After Justin died by suicide in 1998, Fashanu expressed remorse for abandoning his brother. However, in an interview with Talksport in 2012, John Fashanu claimed his brother was not gay and was merely an attention seeker.

Fashanu has two sons, Amir and Akio, and two daughters, Alana and Amal.

Fashanu has been married three times, according to a documentary on football culture made by his daughter Amal. He met his first wife, a Spaniard, when they were both 18. That marriage broke up when Amal was two years old.

Fashanu holds a black belt in Karate.

== In pop culture ==
- Australian band Magic Lunchbox recorded a song about John Fashanu entitled "Fashanu" on their 2005 album Spastique.
- He appeared on Channel 4's Come Dine with Me for a football special shortly prior to the 2010 FIFA World Cup.
- The satirical current affairs programme The Day Today featured a trailer for a fictional show titled "John Fashanu". The trailer consisted of various clips of Fashanu accompanied by sinister music and a voice-over (Steve Coogan) saying the words "John Fashanu" multiple times. This was followed by presenter Chris Morris pronouncing the name incorrectly.
- Fashanu was voted twice to be part in the BBC's satirical "England's Worst ever football team" TV movie, the first time in 2010 and the second time in 2014.

== Honours ==
Wimbledon

- FA Cup: 1987–88

== Notes ==
1. The IMDb page for the TV show Football Challenge on their website, this is incorrect and the show was actually called Fash FC.
