= The Xtra Factor (British TV series) =

- Also known as: The Xtra Factor Live (2016)
- Genre: Reality television
- Created by: Simon Cowell
- Presented by: Ben Shephard; Fearne Cotton; Holly Willoughby; Konnie Huq; Caroline Flack; Olly Murs; Matt Richardson; Sarah-Jane Crawford; Rochelle Humes; Melvin Odoom; Roman Kemp; Rylan Clark; Matt Edmondson
- Voices of: Peter Dickson; Brian Blessed; Redd Pepper
- Country of origin: United Kingdom
- Original language: English
- No. of series: 13
- No. of episodes: 359

Production
- Running time: 30–80 minutes (including advert breaks)
- Production companies: Syco Entertainment; Talkback Thames (2004–2011); Thames (2012–2016)

Original release
- Network: ITV2
- Release: 4 September 2004 – 11 December 2016

Related
- The X Factor

The Xtra Factor (known as The Xtra Factor Live in 2016) is a companion show to the British television music competition The X Factor. It was broadcast on ITV2 and on TV3 in Ireland, on Saturday and Sunday nights after the main ITV show from 4 September 2004 to 11 December 2016. It featured behind-the-scenes footage of The X Factor and shows the emotional responses of the contestants after the judges comment on their performances.

== Background and overview ==
The commissioning of The Xtra Factor was prompted by the success of Big Brother's Little Brother, a former Big Brother companion show screened on E4.

The Xtra Factor featured extra auditions, bootcamp performances and judges' houses performances and behind-the-scenes footage. There were sometimes competitions and games featuring the judges and presenters. During the live shows the programme featured behind-the-scenes footage and answered live video and phone calls for the judges and contestants. Facebook statuses and tweets were read out as well. It also showed the emotional responses of the contestants after the judges comment on their performances. A celebrity panel was usually featured, who gave their opinions on the contestants.

Voiceovers from series 1–6 were done by Peter Dickson, and by Brian Blessed in series 7. Dickson returned in series 8 and continued his role until the show ended after series 13. Redd Pepper only featured in one episode – series 12’s judges houses.

== Broadcast ==
The Xtra Factor usually aired on ITV2 directly after the ITV broadcast of The X Factor. Therefore, from series 1 to 5, The Xtra Factor aired once a week. From Series 6, with the introduction of the Sunday results show, The Xtra Factor aired twice a week, during weeks that there were two episodes of The X Factor.

In series 12, initially The Xtra Factor aired directly after every show (Saturday and Sunday for the first four weeks during the auditions, then every Sunday for the next five weeks during bootcamp and the six-chair challenge, before returning to both Saturday and Sundays, live for judges' houses). From the live shows, the Saturday episode was replaced by a live episode on Thursdays for the remainder of the series, starting on 29 October 2015. For series 13, it reverted to airing directly after each ITV broadcast of The X Factor, though the episode after the live performance shows was 30 minutes long instead of an hour.

Up to the live shows, episodes of The Xtra Factor were pre-recorded, and during the live shows, they were broadcast live from the Fountain Studios, however, for series 13, The Xtra Factor became The Xtra Factor Live which aired live from The Hospital Club after every pre-recorded X Factor show. The live editions after the live shows were still filmed at the Fountain Studios

== Cancellation ==
On 18 January 2017, it was announced that The Xtra Factor would be axed after 13 years and would be replaced by an online show instead.

== Presenters ==
Until series 3, The Xtra Factor was hosted by Ben Shephard. Shephard did not return for series 4, and Fearne Cotton took over as presenter, for series 4 only, before leaving the show to concentrate on her career in America. For series 5, Cotton was replaced by presenter and close friend Holly Willoughby. Willoughby first presented The Xtra Factor on 9 August 2008, a week before series 5 was broadcast. Konnie Huq replaced Willoughby as the new Xtra Factor presenter for series 7. However, Huq decided to depart from the series in March 2011 because of work commitments.

On 31 May 2011, Caroline Flack and Olly Murs were confirmed as the new co-presenters for series 8 by The X Factor's official Twitter page. Both Flack and Murs returned in 2012, however, due to touring in America with One Direction, Murs only presented the live shows though he did recorded interviews with the contestants earlier in the series, while guest presenters such as Jedward and Westlife helped Flack with the audition stages. In April 2013, it was confirmed that Murs would not be returning for series 10 as he wished to concentrate on his own music career. Comedian Matt Richardson was later announced to replace Murs. On 4 June 2014, it was announced that Richardson would not return as co-presenter for series 11. Flack confirmed on 11 June 2014 that she would not be returning to present the 11th series of The Xtra Factor. The next day, it was confirmed that Sarah-Jane Crawford would replace Flack and Richardson as presenter. On 11 May 2015, Crawford confirmed via Twitter that she would not return for a second series in 2015.

On 18 June 2015, it was confirmed that The Saturdays singer Rochelle Humes and Kiss FM DJ Melvin Odoom would be the hosts. On 27 June 2016, it was confirmed that Matt Edmondson would be the host of The Xtra Factor. It was confirmed on 1 July 2016 that Rylan Clark-Neal would co-host alongside Edmondson. The same day, it was announced that Roman Kemp would join the show as the new digital online presenter and social media reporter.

== Spin-offs and specials ==
Cameras follow the finalists during their day, and in early series some of the footage was aired in a spin-off show called The Xtra Factor: The Aftermath, which was broadcast in the middle of the week on ITV2. The Xtra Factor: Xcess All Areas was a live show in which there were interviews, games and trips around the contestants' homes. The show also let viewers know which songs the contestants would be singing in the next live show. Both shows were axed after series 3 due to ITV2 cutting back on spin-off programing. For the series 12 live shows, both formats were revived under a single Thursday night live edition of The Xtra Factor as a replacement for the Saturday edition.

Until Series 10, after the series has come to an end, The Xtra Factor has a week of special programmes titled Best and Worst, featuring the best and worst auditions from the previous series, ranging from one to five episodes each year.

A 60-minute special titled The Winner's Story is broadcast each year over the festive period, featuring the winner of that year's X Factor. Cameras follow the winner from the announcement of the result through the lead-up to the Christmas number one. As from 2010, one week before each series due to start, there features a special called X Factor Rewind looking back at the previous year's contestants and what happened to them during The X Factor and what has happened to them since the show ended. In Series 12, these programmes aired in late afternoon slots on weekends. They started two weeks before the show began, and finished the day the show started, for the first time on ITV. In 2016, the same format was used, but with only 2 episodes, and airing on ITV2.
