= Strictly Come Dancing series 12 =

Strictly Come Dancing
- Series 12
- Presented by: Tess Daly; Claudia Winkleman; Zoe Ball (guest)
- Judges: Darcey Bussell; Len Goodman; Craig Revel Horwood; Bruno Tonioli; Donny Osmond (guest)
- Celebrity winner: Caroline Flack
- Professional winner: Pasha Kovalev
- No. of episodes: 27

Release
- Original network: BBC One
- Original release: 7 September – 20 December 2014

Series chronology
- ← Previous; Series 11 Next → Series 13

Strictly Come Dancing returned for its twelfth series beginning from 7 September 2014 with a launch show, and the live shows began on 26 and 27 September.

After Sir Bruce Forsyth announced his departure from the show at the end of the previous series (He would continue to host the Christmas and Children in Need specials) Tess Daly returned to present the main show on BBC One alongside Claudia Winkleman, who was promoted to co-presenter in addition to the results show, this change would last for 12 additional series until 2025. Zoe Ball returned as presenter of the spin-off show Strictly Come Dancing: It Takes Two on BBC Two. Judges Darcey Bussell, Len Goodman, Craig Revel Horwood, and Bruno Tonioli also returned.

The shows from 1 to 16 November were hosted by Daly and Zoe Ball, after one of Winkleman's children was involved in an accident. Winkleman returned to co-host the show on 22 November.

Caroline Flack and Pasha Kovalev were announced as the winners on 20 December, while Simon Webbe and Kristina Rihanoff, and Frankie Bridge and Kevin Clifton were the runners-up.

== Format ==
Hosts and Judges for Strictly Come Dancing series 12

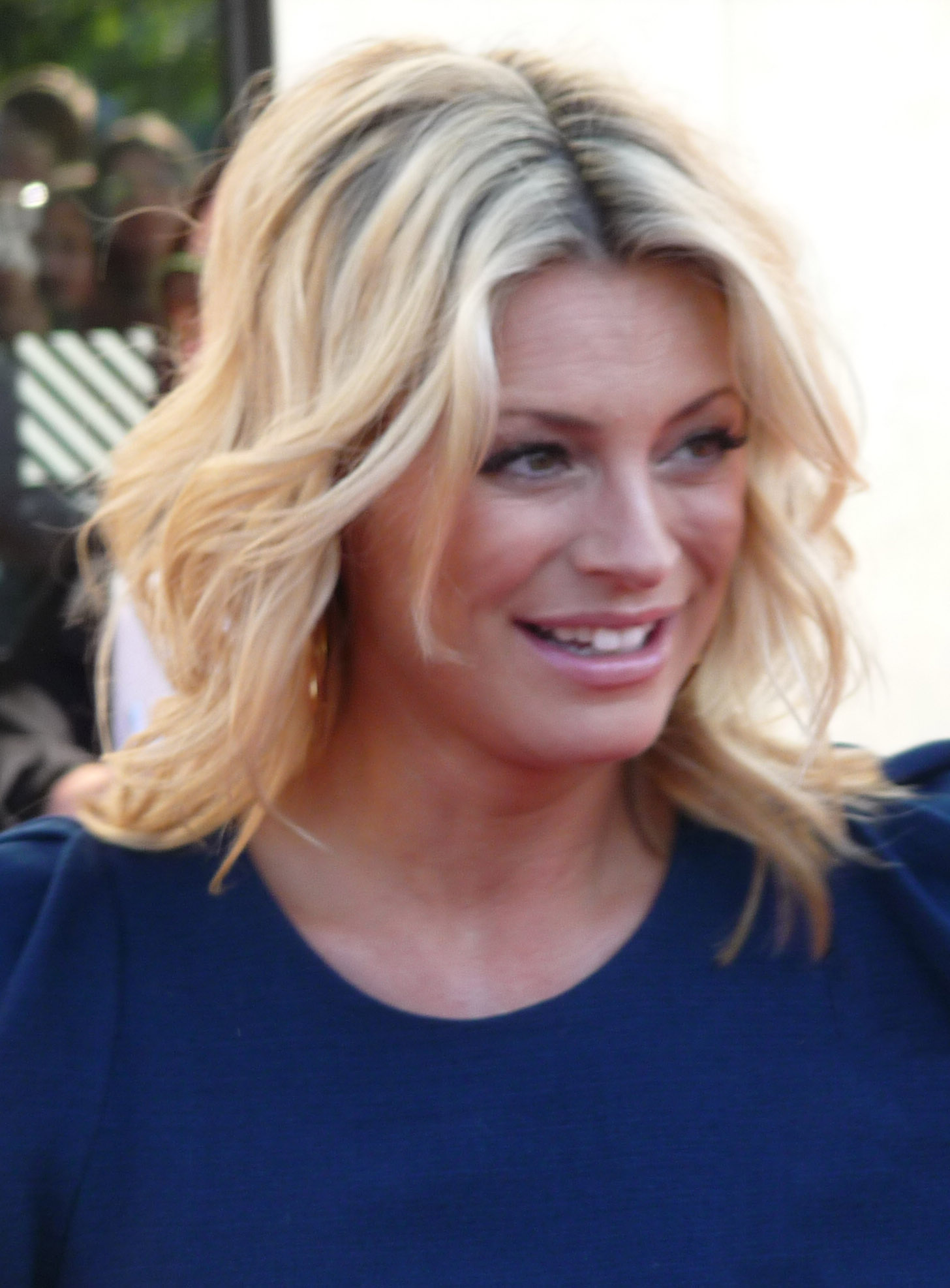
Tess Daly

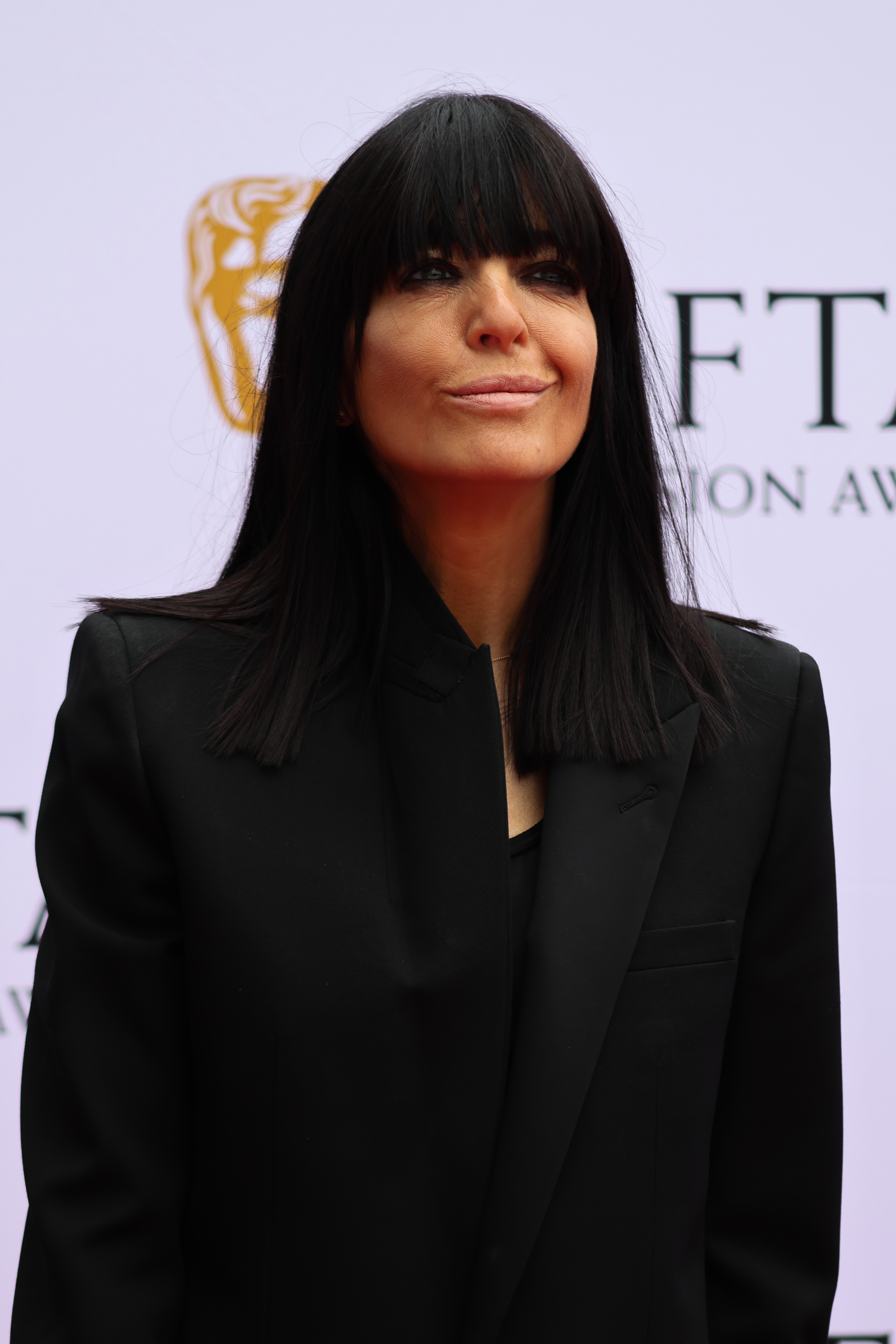
Claudia Winkleman

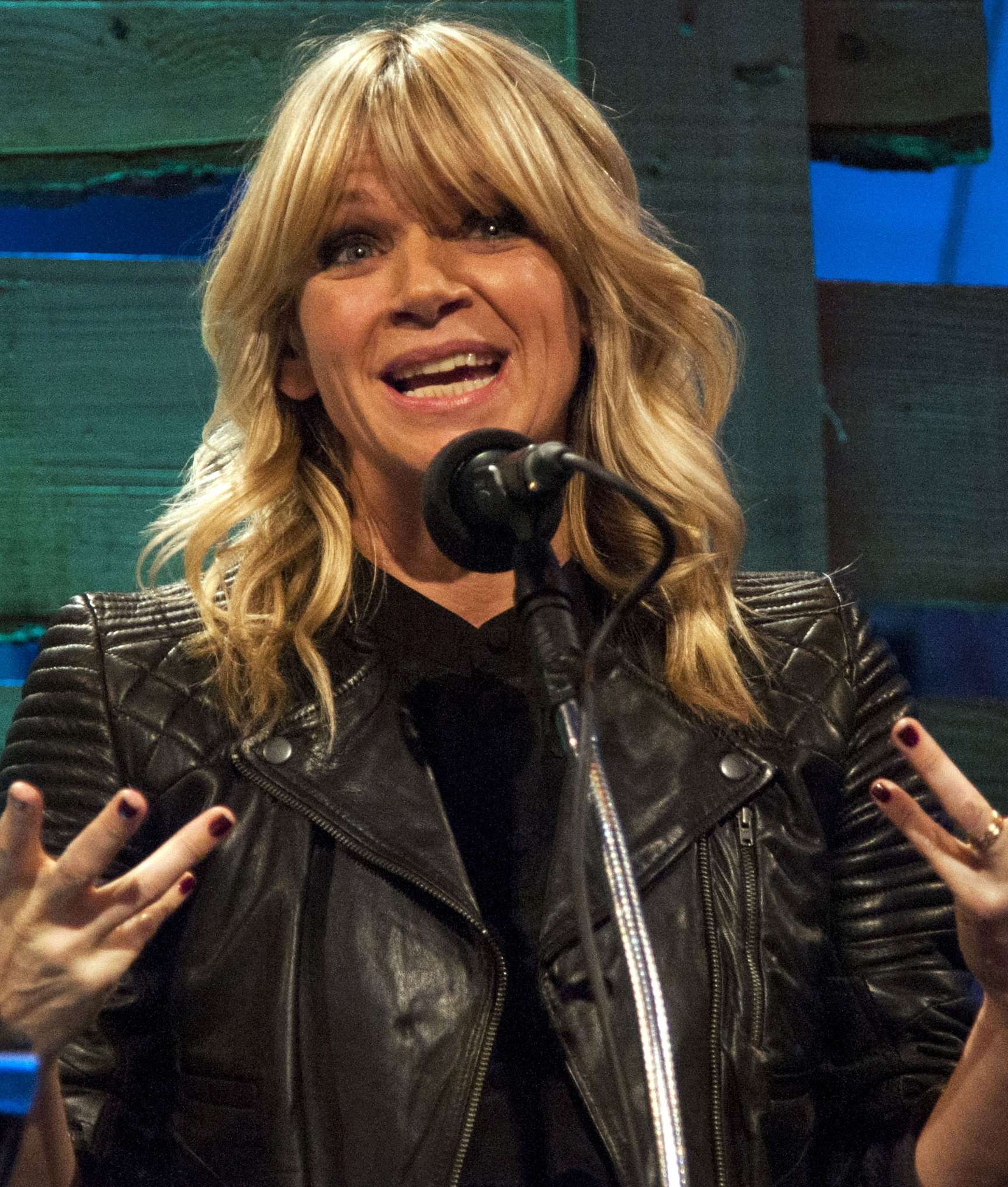
Zoe Ball (guest)

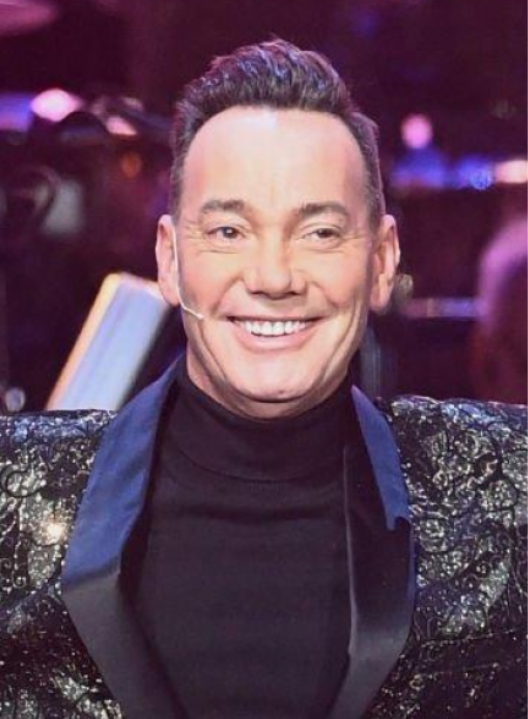
Craig Revel Horwood

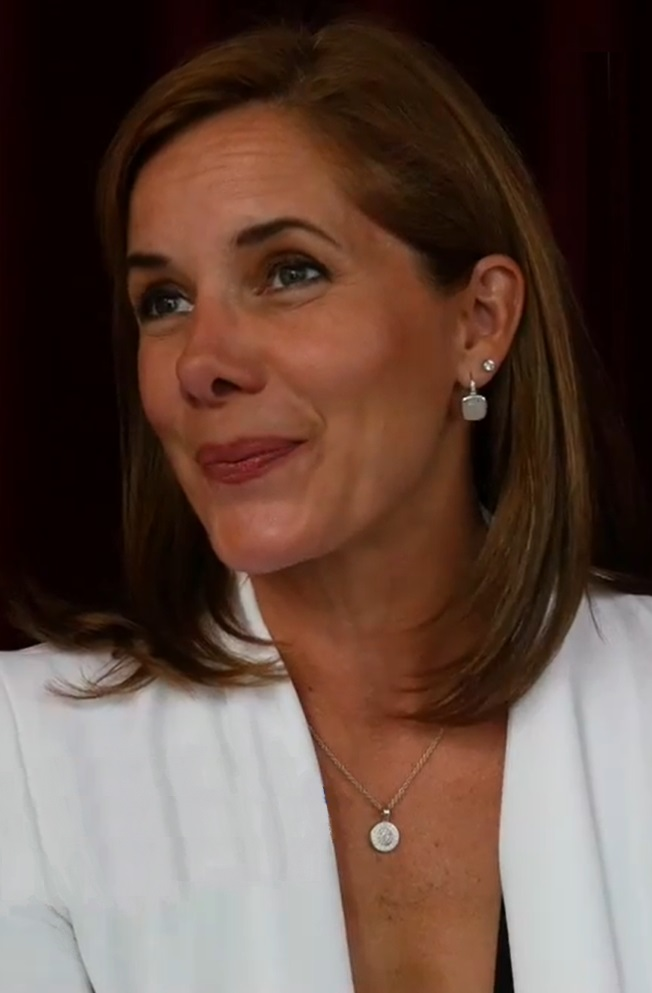
Darcey Bussell

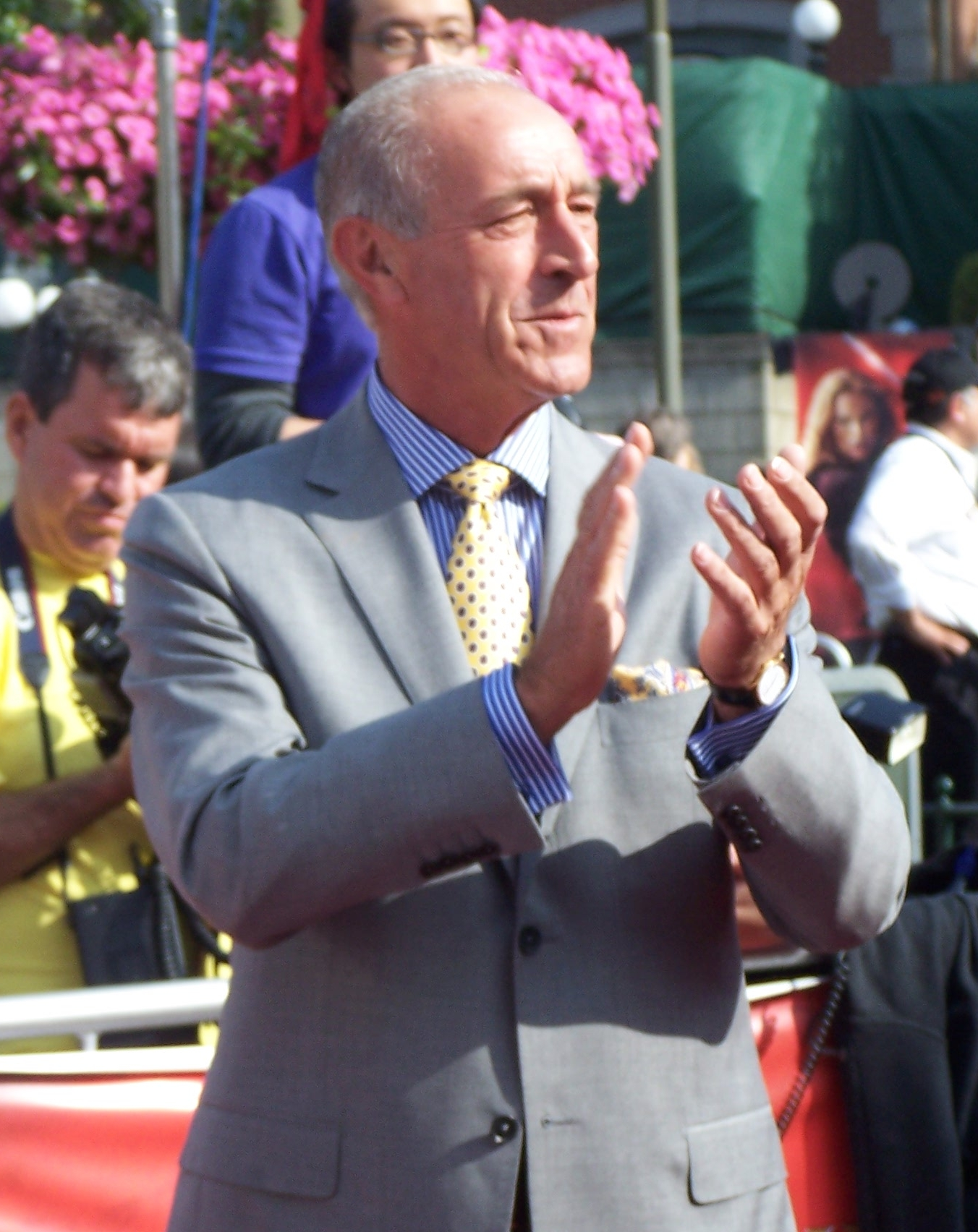
Len Goodman

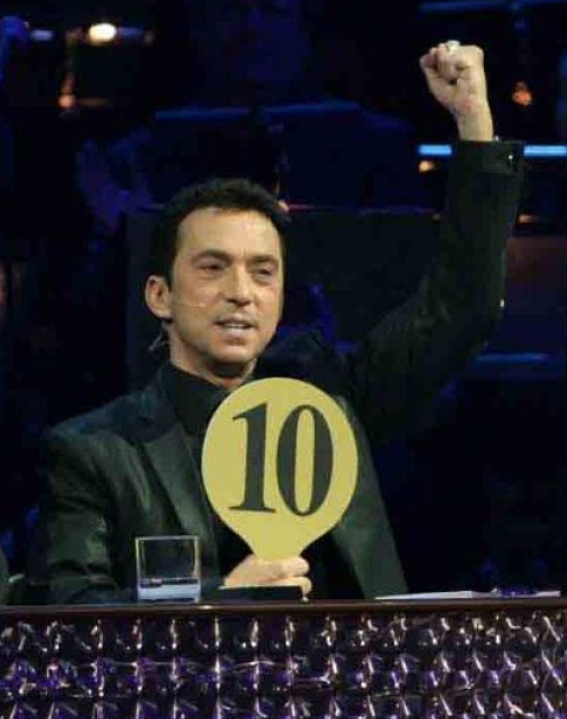
Bruno Tonioli

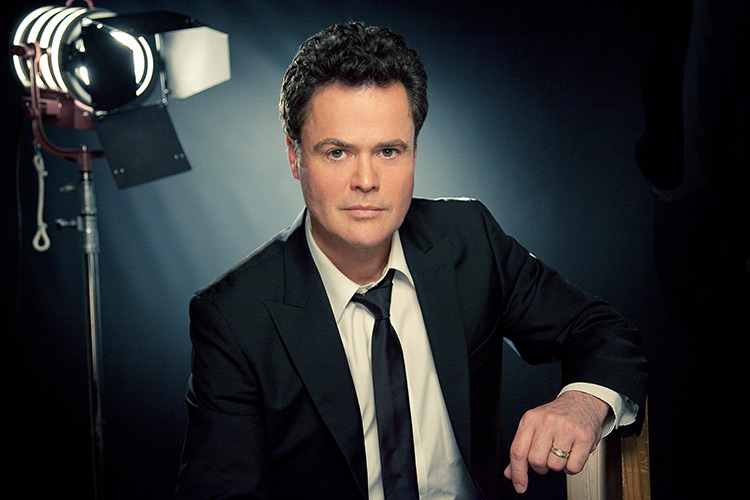
Donny Osmond (guest)

The couples dance each week in a live show. The judges score each performance out of ten. The couples are then ranked according to the judges' scores and given points according to their rank, with the lowest scored couple receiving one point, and the highest scored couple receiving the most points (the maximum number of points available depends on the number of couples remaining in the competition). The public are also invited to vote for their favourite couples, and the couples are ranked again according to the number of votes they receive, again receiving points; the couple with the fewest votes receiving one point, and the couple with the most votes receiving the most points.

The points for judges' score and public vote are then added together, and the two couples with the fewest points are placed in the bottom two. If two couples have equal points, the points from the public vote are given precedence. As with the previous series, the bottom two couples have to perform a dance-off on the results show. Based on that performance alone, each judge then votes on which couple should stay and which couple should leave, with Len Goodman, as head judge, having the last and deciding vote.

== Professional dancers ==
On 1 June 2014, it was revealed that Artem Chigvintsev, Anya Garnis, and James Jordan would not return as professionals, but that Garnis would still be part of the choreography team. They were replaced by two new professionals, Joanne Clifton and Tristan MacManus, as well as Natalie Lowe, who returned after missing the last series due to a foot injury. On 6 August, it was announced that Robin Windsor would not be competing as a professional in the series as previously announced due to a back injury; he was replaced by Trent Whiddon.

== Couples ==
This series featured fifteen celebrity contestants. Frankie Bridge was the first contestant announced on 13 August, and additional celebrities were announced throughout the month. The full line-up was revealed by the BBC on 29 August.

Celebrity	Notability	Professional partner	Status
Gregg Wallace	MasterChef judge	Aliona Vilani	Eliminated 1st on 5 October 2014
Jennifer Gibney	Mrs. Brown's Boys actress	Tristan MacManus	Eliminated 2nd on 12 October 2014
Tim Wonnacott	Bargain Hunt presenter & antiques expert	Natalie Lowe	Eliminated 3rd on 19 October 2014
Thom Evans	Scotland rugby player & model	Iveta Lukošiūtė	Eliminated 4th on 26 October 2014
Scott Mills	BBC Radio 1 presenter	Joanne Clifton	Eliminated 5th on 2 November 2014
Alison Hammond	Television presenter	Aljaž Škorjanec	Eliminated 6th on 9 November 2014
Judy Murray	Tennis coach & British Fed Cup captain	Anton Du Beke	Eliminated 7th on 16 November 2014
Steve Backshall	Naturalist, author & television presenter	Ola Jordan	Eliminated 8th on 23 November 2014
Sunetra Sarker	Casualty actress	Brendan Cole	Eliminated 9th on 30 November 2014
Pixie Lott	Singer-songwriter	Trent Whiddon	Eliminated 10th on 7 December 2014
Jake Wood	EastEnders actor	Janette Manrara	Eliminated 11th on 14 December 2014
Mark Wright	The Only Way Is Essex star	Karen Hauer	Fourth place on 20 December 2014
Frankie Bridge	The Saturdays singer	Kevin Clifton	Runners-up on 20 December 2014
Simon Webbe	Blue singer & actor	Kristina Rihanoff	Runners-up on 20 December 2014
Caroline Flack	Television presenter	Pasha Kovalev	Winners on 20 December 2014

== Scoring chart ==
The highest score each week is indicated in bold green with a dagger (†), while the lowest score each week is indicated in italicized red with a double-dagger (‡).

Color key:

Winners
Runners-up
Fourth place
Bottom two
Eliminated

Strictly Come Dancing series 12 – Weekly scores
Couple	Pl.	Week														
Couple	Pl.	1	2	1+2	3 (Note: The couples were scored on a 50-point scale due to the presence of a guest judge.)	4	5	6	7	8	9	10	11	12	13	
Couple	Pl.	1	2	1+2	3	4	5	6	7	8	9	10	11	12	Show 1	Show 2
Caroline & Pasha	1st	27	29	56	42	**33**†	34	32	31 (Note: This couple was in the bottom two, but was not eliminated.)	37	33	**39**†	39+3=**42**†	35+40=**75**†	40+40=**80**†	+40=**120**† (Note: This couple finished in first place.)
Frankie & Kevin	2nd	**30**†	30	60	**45**†	32	32	**37**†	32	37	**38**†	36	34+5=39	34+38=72	39+38=77	+39=116‡ (Note: This couple finished in second place.)
Simon & Kristina	2nd	27	26	53	30	31	28	29	33	**38**†	36	38	35+4=39	30+38=68	39+39=78	+40=118
Mark & Karen	4th	24	27	51	35	29	33	35	31	36	32	32	35+2=37‡	33+33=66	35+35=70‡ (Note: This couple was eliminated.)	
Jake & Janette	5th	28	**35**†	**63**†	40	**33**†	31	29	27	36	**38**†	29	38+1=39	30+31=61‡		
Pixie & Trent	6th	27	**35**†	62	43	32	**35**†	33	**36**†	**38**†	37	38	35+6=41			
Sunetra & Brendan	7th	24	26	50	40	27	30	27	31	30	30	27‡				
Steve & Ola	8th	26	21	47	34	27	30	26	28	31	23‡					
Judy & Anton	9th	18	17‡	35‡	23	22	18‡	20‡	18‡	24‡						
Alison & Aljaž	10th	26	22	48	28	27	23	26	27							
Scott & Joanne	11th	16‡	20	36	25	15‡	19	21								
Thom & Iveta	12th	23	25	48	38	30	27									
Tim & Natalie	13th	18	23	41	22‡	19										
Jennifer & Tristan	14th	18	19	37	23											
Gregg & Aliona	15th	18	18	36												

=== Average chart ===
This table only counts for dances scored on a traditional 40-point scale. Donny Osmond’s scores from Week 3 have been removed accordingly.

Couple	Rank by average	Total points	Number of dances	Total average
Caroline & Pasha	1st	562	16	35.1
Frankie & Kevin	1st	561	16	35.1
Pixie & Trent	3rd	380	11	34.5
Simon & Kristina	4th	530	16	33.1
Jake & Janette	5th	417	13	32.1
Mark & Karen	6th	476	15	31.7
Sunetra & Brendan	7th	284	10	28.4
Thom & Iveta	8th	136	5	27.2
Steve & Ola	9th	240	9	26.7
Alison & Aljaž	10th	172	7	24.6
Judy & Anton	11th	155	8	19.4
Tim & Natalie	12th	77	4	19.3
Jennifer & Tristan	13th	55	3	18.3
Scott & Joanne	14th	109	6	18.2
Gregg & Aliona	15th	36	2	18.0

== Weekly scores ==
Unless indicated otherwise, individual judges scores in the charts below (given in parentheses) are listed in this order from left to right: Craig Revel Horwood, Darcey Bussell, Len Goodman, Bruno Tonioli.

=== Week 1 ===
Six of the couples performed on the first night and the other nine couples performed on the second night. There was no elimination this week; all scores and votes carried over to the following week. Couples are listed in the order they performed.

Night 1 (Friday)

Couple	Scores	Dance	Music
Caroline & Pasha	27 (6, 7, 7, 7)	Cha-cha-cha	"Can You Feel It" — The Jacksons
Tim & Natalie	18 (3, 5, 5, 5)	Cha-cha-cha	"Shop Around" — Captain & Tennille
Jake & Janette	28 (7, 7, 7, 7)	Tango	"Toxic" — Britney Spears
Judy & Anton	18 (3, 4, 6, 5)	Waltz	"Mull of Kintyre" — Wings
Scott & Joanne	16 (2, 4, 5, 5)	Cha-cha-cha	"Rock DJ" — Robbie Williams
Pixie & Trent	27 (7, 6, 7, 7)	Jive	"Shake It Off" — Taylor Swift

Night 2 (Saturday)

Couple	Scores	Dance	Music
Mark & Karen	24 (5, 7, 6, 6)	Cha-cha-cha	"I'm Your Man" — Wham!
Alison & Aljaž	26 (6, 6, 7, 7)	Cha-cha-cha	"I'm Every Woman" — Chaka Khan
Steve & Ola	26 (6, 6, 7, 7)	Tango	"Born to Be Wild" — Steppenwolf
Jennifer & Tristan	18 (3, 5, 5, 5)	Jive	"Happy" — Pharrell Williams
Thom & Iveta	23 (5, 6, 6, 6)	Waltz	"You Raise Me Up" — Westlife
Sunetra & Brendan	24 (5, 6, 6, 7)	Tango	"Bad Case of Loving You (Doctor, Doctor)" — Robert Palmer
Gregg & Aliona	18 (3, 5, 5, 5)	Cha-cha-cha	"Hot n Cold" — Katy Perry
Frankie & Kevin	30 (7, 7, 8, 8)	Waltz	"Someone Like You" — Adele
Simon & Kristina	27 (6, 7, 7, 7)	Jive	"Good Golly, Miss Molly" — Little Richard

=== Week 2 ===
Musical guest: Nina Simone — "Don't Let Me Be Misunderstood"

Couples are listed in the order they performed.

Couple	Scores	Dance	Music	Result
Thom & Iveta	25 (5, 7, 7, 6)	Salsa	"Hot Hot Hot" — Arrow	Safe
Jennifer & Tristan	19 (4, 5, 5, 5)	Waltz	"A Natural Woman" — Aretha Franklin	Bottom two
Simon & Kristina	26 (5, 7, 7, 7)	Tango	"Sing" — Ed Sheeran	Safe
Gregg & Aliona	18 (3, 5, 5, 5)	Charleston	"Hey, Good Lookin'" — Ray Charles	Eliminated
Alison & Aljaž	22 (5, 5, 6, 6)	Foxtrot	"I Just Want to Make Love to You" — Etta James	Safe
Jake & Janette	35 (8, 9, 9, 9)	Salsa	"Mambo No. 5" — Lou Bega	Safe
Judy & Anton	17 (2, 5, 5, 5)	Cha-cha-cha	"She's a Lady" — Tom Jones	Safe
Caroline & Pasha	29 (7, 7, 7, 8)	Tango	"Blame" — Calvin Harris	Safe
Tim & Natalie	23 (5, 6, 6, 6)	Waltz	"When You Wish upon a Star" — Cliff Edwards	Safe
Sunetra & Brendan	26 (6, 6, 7, 7)	Cha-cha-cha	"Million Dollar Bill" — Whitney Houston	Safe
Mark & Karen	27 (6, 7, 7, 7)	American Smooth	"I'm Yours" — Jason Mraz	Safe
Scott & Joanne	20 (4, 5, 6, 5)	Tango	"Stop" — Spice Girls	Safe
Pixie & Trent	35 (8, 9, 9, 9)	Waltz	"Come Away with Me" — Norah Jones	Safe
Steve & Ola	21 (3, 6, 6, 6)	Cha-cha-cha	"Treasure" — Bruno Mars	Safe
Frankie & Kevin	30 (7, 7, 8, 8)	Charleston	"Happy Days" — Pratt & McClain	Safe

Judges' votes to save

- Horwood: Jennifer & Tristan
- Bussell: Jennifer & Tristan
- Tonioli: Jennifer & Tristan
- Goodman: Did not vote, but would have voted to save Jennifer & Tristan

=== Week 3: Movie Week ===
Individual judges scores given in the chart below (given in parentheses) are listed in this order from left to right: Craig Revel Horwood, Darcey Bussell, Donny Osmond, Len Goodman, Bruno Tonioli.

Musical guest: Donny Osmond — "Moon River"

Couples are listed in the order they performed.

Couple	Scores	Dance	Music	Film	Result
Alison & Aljaž	28 (4, 5, 7, 6, 6)	Jive	"Footloose"	Footloose	Safe
Steve & Ola	34 (6, 7, 6, 7, 8)	Quickstep	"I Wan'na Be Like You"	The Jungle Book	Safe
Jennifer & Tristan	23 (3, 5, 5, 5, 5)	Foxtrot	"Mamma Mia"	Mamma Mia!	Eliminated
Simon & Kristina	30 (4, 6, 7, 6, 7)	Rumba	"Take My Breath Away"	Top Gun	Bottom two
Judy & Anton	23 (3, 5, 5, 5, 5)	Quickstep	"Don't Rain on My Parade"	Funny Girl	Safe
Tim & Natalie	22 (2, 5, 5, 5, 5)	Charleston	"Money, Money"	Cabaret	Safe
Caroline & Pasha	42 (8, 8, 9, 8, 9)	Rumba	"I Don't Want to Miss a Thing"	Armageddon	Safe
Scott & Joanne	25 (2, 5, 7, 5, 6)	Samba	"Under the Sea"	The Little Mermaid	Safe
Frankie & Kevin	45 (8, 9, 10, 9, 9)	Paso doble	"America"	West Side Story	Safe
Jake & Janette	40 (8, 8, 8, 8, 8)	Waltz	"The Godfather Waltz"	The Godfather	Safe
Pixie & Trent	43 (7, 9, 9, 9, 9)	Quickstep	"Be Our Guest"	Beauty and the Beast	Safe
Thom & Iveta	38 (7, 8, 7, 8, 8)	Charleston	"New York, New York"	On the Town	Safe
Sunetra & Brendan	40 (7, 8, 8, 9, 8)	American Smooth	"The Way You Look Tonight"	Swing Time	Safe
Mark & Karen	35 (6, 6, 9, 7, 7)	Paso doble	"Superman Theme"	Superman	Safe

Judges' votes to save

- Horwood: Simon & Kristina
- Bussell: Simon & Kristina
- Osmond: Simon & Kristina
- Tonioli: Did not vote, but would have voted to save Simon & Kristina
- Goodman: Did not vote, but would have voted to save Simon & Kristina

=== Week 4 ===
Musical guests: Lady Gaga & Tony Bennett — "Anything Goes" & "It Don't Mean a Thing (If It Ain't Got That Swing)"

Couples are listed in the order they performed.

Couple	Scores	Dance	Music	Result
Frankie & Kevin	32 (8, 8, 8, 8)	Cha-cha-cha	"Call Me Maybe" — Carly Rae Jepsen	Safe
Mark & Karen	29 (7, 7, 7, 8)	Quickstep	"Tiger Feet" — Mud	Bottom two
Judy & Anton	22 (4, 6, 6, 6)	Tango	"Jealousy" — Billy Fury	Safe
Simon & Kristina	31 (7, 8, 8, 8)	Charleston	"My Old Man (Said Follow the Van)" — Kenny Ball	Safe
Alison & Aljaž	27 (6, 7, 7, 7)	Samba	"Bootylicious" — Destiny's Child	Safe
Scott & Joanne	15 (2, 5, 4, 4)	American Smooth	"Total Eclipse of the Heart" — Bonnie Tyler	Safe
Steve & Ola	27 (6, 7, 7, 7)	Salsa	"Jump in the Line (Shake, Senora)" — Harry Belafonte	Safe
Pixie & Trent	32 (8, 8, 8, 8)	Rumba	"Stay with Me" — Sam Smith	Safe
Tim & Natalie	19 (3, 6, 5, 5)	Paso doble	"The Best" — Tina Turner	Eliminated
Sunetra & Brendan	27 (6, 7, 7, 7)	Salsa	"Turn the Beat Around" — Vicki Sue Robinson	Safe
Thom & Iveta	30 (6, 8, 8, 8)	Foxtrot	"Build Me Up Buttercup" — The Foundations	Safe
Jake & Janette	33 (8, 9, 8, 8)	Jive	"All Shook Up" — Elvis Presley	Safe
Caroline & Pasha	33 (8, 8, 9, 8)	Quickstep	"We Go Together" — from Grease	Safe

Judges' votes to save

- Horwood: Mark & Karen
- Bussell: Mark & Karen
- Tonioli: Mark & Karen
- Goodman: Did not vote, but would have voted to save Mark & Karen

=== Week 5 ===
Musical guest: Culture Club — "Karma Chameleon"

Couples are listed in the order they performed.

Couple	Scores	Dance	Music	Result
Jake & Janette	31 (7, 8, 8, 8)	Quickstep	"I'm Still Standing" — Elton John	Safe
Sunetra & Brendan	30 (7, 7, 8, 8)	Viennese waltz	"Anyone Who Had a Heart" — Cilla Black	Safe
Scott & Joanne	19 (4, 5, 5, 5)	Charleston	"Flash, Bang, Wallop" — Tommy Steele	Safe
Thom & Iveta	27 (6, 7, 7, 7)	Cha-cha-cha	"It's My Party" — Jessie J	Eliminated
Frankie & Kevin	32 (8, 8, 8, 8)	Foxtrot	"Daydream Believer" — The Monkees	Safe
Alison & Aljaž	23 (5, 6, 6, 6)	Tango	"Addicted to You" — Avicii	Safe
Mark & Karen	33 (8, 9, 8, 8)	Samba	"That's the Way (I Like It)" — KC and the Sunshine Band	Safe
Simon & Kristina	28 (7, 7, 7, 7)	Viennese waltz	"Somebody to Love" — Queen	Bottom two
Judy & Anton	18 (3, 5, 5, 5)	Charleston	"Varsity Drag" — Pasadena Roof Orchestra	Safe
Caroline & Pasha	34 (8, 9, 8, 9)	Paso doble	"Live and Let Die" — Paul McCartney and Wings	Safe
Steve & Ola	30 (7, 8, 7, 8)	Waltz	"I Wonder Why" — Curtis Stigers	Safe
Pixie & Trent	35 (8, 9, 9, 9)	Samba	"I, Yi, Yi, Yi, Yi (I Like You Very Much)" — Edmundo Ros	Safe

Judges' votes to save

- Horwood: Thom & Iveta
- Bussell: Thom & Iveta
- Tonioli: Simon & Kristina
- Goodman: Simon & Kristina (Since the other judges were not unanimous, Len Goodman, as head judge, made the final decision to save Simon & Kristina.)

=== Week 6: Halloween Week ===
Musical guest: Annie Lennox — "I Put a Spell on You"

Couples are listed in the order they performed.

Couple	Scores	Dance	Music	Result
Sunetra & Brendan	27 (6, 7, 7, 7)	Jive	"Tainted Love" — Gloria Jones	Safe
Alison & Aljaž	26 (5, 7, 7, 7)	American Smooth	"Wuthering Heights" — Kate Bush	Bottom two
Simon & Kristina	29 (6, 8, 7, 8)	Paso doble	"Poison" — Alice Cooper	Safe
Steve & Ola	26 (5, 7, 7, 7)	Charleston	"Dem Bones" — Kay Starr	Safe
Pixie & Trent	33 (8, 8, 8, 9)	Tango	"Danger! High Voltage" — Electric Six	Safe
Judy & Anton	20 (3, 6, 6, 5)	American Smooth	"Cruella de Vil" — from One Hundred and One Dalmatians	Safe
Jake & Janette	29 (6, 7, 8, 8)	Paso doble	"Black Betty" — Ram Jam	Safe
Caroline & Pasha	32 (7, 8, 8, 9)	Samba	"Le Freak" — Chic	Safe
Scott & Joanne	21 (3, 6, 6, 6)	Foxtrot	"The Addams Family Theme" — Vic Mizzy	Eliminated
Mark & Karen	35 (8, 9, 9, 9)	Jive	"Prologue (Little Shop of Horrors)" — from Little Shop of Horrors	Safe
Frankie & Kevin	37 (9, 9, 9, 10)	Tango	"Defying Gravity" — from Wicked	Safe

Judges' votes to save

- Horwood: Alison & Aljaž
- Bussell: Alison & Aljaž
- Tonioli: Alison & Aljaž
- Goodman: Did not vote, but would have voted to save Scott & Joanne

=== Week 7 ===
Musical guest: Katherine Jenkins — "We'll Gather Lilacs"

Couples are listed in the order they performed.

Couple	Scores	Dance	Music	Result
Simon & Kristina	33 (7, 9, 9, 8)	Quickstep	"I Got Rhythm" — Bobby Darin	Safe
Caroline & Pasha	31 (7, 8, 8, 8)	Waltz	"Three Times a Lady" — Commodores	Bottom two
Jake & Janette	27 (6, 7, 7, 7)	Rumba	"Strangers in the Night" — Frank Sinatra	Safe
Judy & Anton	18 (3, 5, 5, 5)	Paso doble	"I Fought the Law" — The Clash	Safe
Sunetra & Brendan	31 (7, 8, 8, 8)	Foxtrot	"All of Me" — John Legend	Safe
Alison & Aljaž	27 (6, 7, 7, 7)	Charleston	"Friend Like Me" — from Aladdin	Eliminated
Mark & Karen	31 (7, 8, 8, 8)	Waltz	"Weekend in New England" — Barry Manilow	Safe
Frankie & Kevin	32 (7, 8, 9, 8)	Samba	"La Bamba" — Connie Francis	Safe
Pixie & Trent	36 (9, 10, 8, 9)	Foxtrot	"When I'm Sixty-Four" — The Beatles	Safe
Steve & Ola	28 (6, 8, 7, 7)	Paso doble	"Use Somebody" — Kings of Leon	Safe

Judges' votes to save

- Horwood: Caroline & Pasha
- Bussell: Caroline & Pasha
- Tonioli: Caroline & Pasha
- Goodman: Did not vote, but would have voted to save Caroline & Pasha

=== Week 8: Blackpool Week ===
Musical guests: Shirley Bassey — "Goldfinger" and McBusted—"Air Guitar"

This week's episode was staged in the Tower Ballroom at the Blackpool Tower in Blackpool, Lancashire. Couples are listed in the order they performed.

Couple	Scores	Dance	Music	Result
Frankie & Kevin	37 (8, 9, 10, 10)	Quickstep	"Town Called Malice" — The Jam	Safe
Jake & Janette	36 (9, 9, 9, 9)	American Smooth	"Feeling Good" — Michael Bublé	Safe
Sunetra & Brendan	30 (6, 8, 8, 8)	Samba	"I Don't Feel Like Dancin'" — Scissor Sisters	Bottom two
Simon & Kristina	38 (8, 10, 10, 10)	Argentine tango	"El Tango de Roxanne" — from Moulin Rouge!	Safe
Judy & Anton	24 (4, 6, 7, 7)	Viennese waltz	"Let's Go Fly a Kite" — from Mary Poppins	Eliminated
Mark & Karen	36 (9, 9, 9, 9)	Charleston	"We No Speak Americano" — Yolanda Be Cool & DCUP	Safe
Pixie & Trent	38 (9, 9, 10, 10)	Paso doble	"The Eve of the War" — Jeff Wayne	Safe
Steve & Ola	31 (7, 8, 8, 8)	American Smooth	"Rolling in the Deep" — Adele	Safe
Caroline & Pasha	37 (9, 9, 9, 10)	Jive	"Crocodile Rock" — Elton John	Safe

Judges' votes to save

- Horwood: Sunetra & Brendan
- Bussell: Sunetra & Brendan
- Tonioli: Sunetra & Brendan
- Goodman: Did not vote, but would have voted to save Sunetra & Brendan

=== Week 9 ===
Musical guest: Barry Manilow — "Copacabana" & "What a Wonderful World"

Couples are listed in the order they performed.

Couple	Scores	Dance	Music	Result
Steve & Ola	23 (4, 7, 6, 6)	Jive	"Little Bitty Pretty One" — Frankie Lymon	Eliminated
Caroline & Pasha	33 (7, 8, 9, 9)	American Smooth	"Mack the Knife" — Robbie Williams	Safe
Pixie & Trent	37 (9, 9, 9, 10)	Charleston	"Sparkling Diamonds" — from Moulin Rouge!	Safe
Mark & Karen	32 (8, 8, 8, 8)	Tango	"Love Runs Out" — OneRepublic	Safe
Frankie & Kevin	38 (9, 9, 10, 10)	Viennese waltz	"What's New Pussycat?" — Tom Jones	Safe
Jake & Janette	38 (9, 10, 10, 9)	Samba	"Macarena" — Los del Río	Safe
Sunetra & Brendan	30 (7, 7, 8, 8)	Waltz	"Last Request" — Paolo Nutini	Bottom two
Simon & Kristina	36 (9, 9, 9, 9)	Salsa	"Let's Hear It for the Boy" — Deniece Williams	Safe

Judges' votes to save

- Horwood: Sunetra & Brendan
- Bussell: Steve & Ola
- Tonioli: Sunetra & Brendan
- Goodman: Sunetra & Brendan

=== Week 10: "Around the World" Week ===
Musical guests: André Rieu & Alfie Boe — "Volare"
Dance guests: Michael Flatley & Lord of the Dance

Couples are listed in the order they performed.

Couple	Scores	Dance	Country	Music	Result
Pixie & Trent	38 (9, 9, 10, 10)	Viennese waltz	Netherlands	"Tulips from Amsterdam" — Max Bygraves	Safe
Mark & Karen	32 (7, 8, 9, 8)	Salsa	United States	"Viva Las Vegas" — Elvis Presley	Bottom two
Sunetra & Brendan	27 (5, 7, 8, 7)	Rumba	Brazil	"The Girl from Ipanema" — Michael Bolton	Eliminated
Caroline & Pasha	39 (9, 10, 10, 10)	Charleston	Turkey	"Istanbul (Not Constantinople)" — They Might Be Giants	Safe
Simon & Kristina	38 (9, 10, 10, 9)	Waltz	Austria	"Edelweiss" — from The Sound of Music	Safe
Frankie & Kevin	36 (9, 9, 9, 9)	Jive	United States	"Surfin' U.S.A." — The Beach Boys	Safe
Jake & Janette	29 (5, 8, 8, 8)	Argentine tango	Greece	"Zorbas" — Mikis Theodorakis	Safe

Judges' votes to save

- Horwood: Mark & Karen
- Bussell: Mark & Karen
- Tonioli: Mark & Karen
- Goodman: Did not vote, but would have voted to save Mark & Karen

=== Week 11: Quarter-final ===
Musical guest: OneRepublic — "Counting Stars"

Each couple performed one routine and then all couples participated in a waltz marathon for additional points. Couples are listed in the order they performed.

Couple	Scores	Dance	Music	Result
Simon & Kristina	35 (8, 9, 9, 9)	American Smooth	"Heartache Tonight" — Michael Bublé	Bottom two
Caroline & Pasha	39 (9, 10, 10, 10)	Argentine tango	"La cumparsita" — Gerardo Matos Rodríguez	Safe
Pixie & Trent	35 (9, 9, 8, 9)	Cha-cha-cha	"Love Shack" — The B-52's	Eliminated
Mark & Karen	35 (8, 9, 9, 9)	Foxtrot	"L-O-V-E" — Nat King Cole	Safe
Jake & Janette	38 (9, 9, 10, 10)	Charleston	"Entrance of the Gladiators" — Julius Fučík	Safe
Frankie & Kevin	34 (8, 9, 8, 9)	Salsa	"Work (Freemasons Remix)" — Kelly Rowland	Safe
Jake & Janette	1	Waltz-a-thon (Waltz Marathon)	"The Last Waltz" — Engelbert Humperdinck	
Mark & Karen	2	Waltz-a-thon (Waltz Marathon)	"The Last Waltz" — Engelbert Humperdinck	
Caroline & Pasha	3	Waltz-a-thon (Waltz Marathon)	"The Last Waltz" — Engelbert Humperdinck	
Simon & Kristina	4	Waltz-a-thon (Waltz Marathon)	"The Last Waltz" — Engelbert Humperdinck	
Frankie & Kevin	5	Waltz-a-thon (Waltz Marathon)	"The Last Waltz" — Engelbert Humperdinck	
Pixie & Trent	6	Waltz-a-thon (Waltz Marathon)	"The Last Waltz" — Engelbert Humperdinck	

Judges' votes to save

- Horwood: Pixie & Trent
- Bussell: Simon & Kristina
- Tonioli: Pixie & Trent
- Goodman: Simon & Kristina (Since the other judges were not unanimous, Len Goodman, as head judge, made the final decision to save Simon & Kristina.)

=== Week 12: Semi-final ===
Musical guest: Paloma Faith — "Changing"

Each couple performed two routines, and are listed in the order they performed.

Couple	Scores	Dance	Music	Result
Jake & Janette	30 (6, 8, 8, 8)	Cha-cha-cha	"Boogie Shoes" — KC and the Sunshine Band	Eliminated
Jake & Janette	31 (7, 8, 8, 8)	Viennese waltz	"When a Man Loves a Woman" — Percy Sledge	Eliminated
Frankie & Kevin	34 (7, 8, 9, 10)	Rumba	"Somewhere Only We Know" — Lily Allen	Safe
Frankie & Kevin	38 (9, 9, 10, 10)	Argentine tango	"The 5th" — David Garrett	Safe
Mark & Karen	33 (8, 8, 9, 8)	Viennese waltz	"I Got You Babe" — Sonny & Cher	Bottom two
Mark & Karen	33 (9, 8, 8, 8)	Rumba	"Fields of Gold" — Eva Cassidy	Bottom two
Simon & Kristina	30 (6, 9, 8, 7)	Samba	"I Like to Move It" — Reel 2 Real	Safe
Simon & Kristina	38 (9, 10, 10, 9)	Foxtrot	"My Guy" — Mary Wells	Safe
Caroline & Pasha	35 (8, 9, 9, 9)	Foxtrot	"Diamonds" — Josef Salvat	Safe
Caroline & Pasha	40 (10, 10, 10, 10)	Salsa	"María" — Ricky Martin	Safe

Judges votes to save

- Horwood: Mark & Karen
- Bussell: Jake & Janette
- Tonioli: Jake & Janette
- Goodman: Mark & Karen (Since the other judges were not unanimous, Len Goodman, as head judge, made the final decision to save Mark & Karen.)

=== Week 13: Final ===
Musical guest: Take That — "Greatest Day", "These Days" & "Never Forget"

During the first show, each couple performed two routines, one of which was their showdance routine and the other chosen by the judges. At the beginning of the second show, the couple with the lowest public vote was eliminated. During the second show, the remaining couples performed their favourite dance of the series. Couples are listed in the order they performed.

Show 1

Couple	Scores	Dance	Music	Result
Frankie & Kevin	39 (9, 10, 10, 10)	Samba	"La Bamba" — Connie Francis	Safe
Frankie & Kevin	38 (9, 9, 10, 10)	Showdance	"Get Happy" — Judy Garland	Safe
Mark & Karen	35 (8, 9, 9, 9)	Cha-cha-cha	"I'm Your Man" — Wham!	Fourth place
Mark & Karen	35 (8, 9, 9, 9)	Showdance	"Don't Stop Me Now" — Queen	Fourth place
Caroline & Pasha	40 (10, 10, 10, 10)	Cha-cha-cha	"Can You Feel It" — The Jacksons	Safe
Caroline & Pasha	40 (10, 10, 10, 10)	Showdance	"Angels" — Beverley Knight	Safe
Simon & Kristina	39 (9, 10, 10, 10)	Charleston	"My Old Man (Said Follow the Van)" — Kenny Ball	Safe
Simon & Kristina	39 (9, 10, 10, 10)	Showdance	"A Little Less Conversation" — Elvis Presley	Safe

Show 2

Couple	Scores	Dance	Music	Result
Frankie & Kevin	39 (9, 10, 10, 10)	Paso doble	"America" — from West Side Story	Runners-up
Caroline & Pasha	40 (10, 10, 10, 10)	Charleston	"Istanbul (Not Constantinople)" — They Might Be Giants	Winners
Simon & Kristina	40 (10, 10, 10, 10)	Argentine tango	"El Tango de Roxanne" — from Moulin Rouge!	Runners-up

== Dance chart ==
The couples performed the following each week:

- Weeks 1–10: One unlearned dance
- Week 11: One unlearned dance & waltz marathon
- Week 12: Two unlearned dances
- Week 13 (Show 1): Judges' choice & showdance
- Week 13 (Show 2): Favourite dance of the series

Strictly Come Dancing series 12 – Dance chart
Couple	Week																
Couple	1	2	3	4	5	6	7	8	9	10	11		12		13		
Caroline & Pasha	Cha-cha-cha	Tango	Rumba	Quickstep	Paso doble	Samba	Waltz	Jive	American Smooth	Charleston	Argentine tango	Waltz; Marathon	Foxtrot	Salsa	Cha-cha-cha	Showdance	Charleston
Frankie & Kevin	Waltz	Charleston	Paso doble	Cha-cha-cha	Foxtrot	Tango	Samba	Quickstep	Viennese waltz	Jive	Salsa	Waltz; Marathon	Rumba	Argentine tango	Samba	Showdance	Paso doble
Simon & Kristina	Jive	Tango	Rumba	Charleston	Viennese waltz	Paso doble	Quickstep	Argentine tango	Salsa	Waltz	American Smooth	Waltz; Marathon	Samba	Foxtrot	Charleston	Showdance	Argentine tango
Mark & Karen	Cha-cha-cha	American Smooth	Paso doble	Quickstep	Samba	Jive	Waltz	Charleston	Tango	Salsa	Foxtrot	Waltz; Marathon	Viennese waltz	Rumba	Cha-cha-cha	Showdance	
Jake & Janette	Tango	Salsa	Waltz	Jive	Quickstep	Paso doble	Rumba	American Smooth	Samba	Argentine tango	Charleston	Waltz; Marathon	Cha-cha-cha	Viennese waltz			
Pixie & Trent	Jive	Waltz	Quickstep	Rumba	Samba	Tango	Foxtrot	Paso doble	Charleston	Viennese waltz	Cha-cha-cha	Waltz; Marathon					
Sunetra & Brendan	Tango	Cha-cha-cha	American Smooth	Salsa	Viennese waltz	Jive	Foxtrot	Samba	Waltz	Rumba							
Steve & Ola	Tango	Cha-cha-cha	Quickstep	Salsa	Waltz	Charleston	Paso doble	American Smooth	Jive								
Judy & Anton	Waltz	Cha-cha-cha	Quickstep	Tango	Charleston	American Smooth	Paso doble	Viennese waltz									
Alison & Aljaž	Cha-cha-cha	Foxtrot	Jive	Samba	Tango	American Smooth	Charleston										
Scott & Joanne	Cha-cha-cha	Tango	Samba	American Smooth	Charleston	Foxtrot											
Thom & Iveta	Waltz	Salsa	Charleston	Foxtrot	Cha-cha-cha												
Tim & Natalie	Cha-cha-cha	Waltz	Charleston	Paso doble													
Jennifer & Tristan	Jive	Waltz	Foxtrot														
Gregg & Aliona	Cha-cha-cha	Charleston															

== Reception ==
Donny Osmond's role as a judge in week three was panned by viewers, as he, unlike the other judges, was not a professional dancer. Viewers also deemed his scoring too inconsistent, as he awarded unusually high marks, including the first ten of the series.

== Ratings ==
Weekly ratings for each show on BBC One. All ratings are provided by BARB.

Episode	Date	Official rating (millions)	Weekly rank for BBC One	Weekly rank for all UK TV	Share
Launch show	7 September	9.16	2	2	33.7%
Week 1 (Night 1)	26 September	8.21	3	4	28.5%
Week 1 (Night 2)	27 September	9.40	1	1	39.0%
Week 2	4 October	9.93	2	2	43.3%
Week 2 results	5 October	9.35	3	3	38.3%
Week 3	11 October	9.74	2	2	39.2%
Week 3 results	12 October	9.04	3	3	35.2%
Week 4	18 October	10.30	1	1	43.3%
Week 4 results	19 October	9.61	2	2	38.8%
Week 5	25 October	10.65	1	1	42.9%
Week 5 results	26 October	10.09	2	2	39.7%
Week 6	1 November	10.93	1	1	44.1%
Week 6 results	2 November	10.06	2	2	39.2%
Week 7	8 November	10.52	1	1	42.8%
Week 7 results	9 November	9.69	2	2	35.9%
Week 8	15 November	11.46	1	1	44.6%
Week 8 results	16 November	10.53	2	2	40.8%
Week 9	22 November	10.33	1	1	38.9%
Week 9 results	23 November	10.28	2	2	40.1%
Week 10	29 November	10.76	1	1	42.4%
Week 10 results	30 November	10.45	2	2	41.3%
Week 11	6 December	10.97	1	1	43.0%
Week 11 results	7 December	9.71	2	2	35.2%
Week 12	13 December	10.98	1	1	42.4%
Week 12 results	14 December	10.25	2	2	38.3%
Week 13	20 December	11.67	1	1	46.4%
Week 13 results	20 December	11.62	2	2	42.8%
Series average (excl. launch show)	2014	10.25	—N/a	—N/a	40.2%
