= Crow (Australian band) =

Australian rock band

- Origin: Sydney, New South Wales, Australia
- Genre: Rock
- Years active: 1986–1999, 2007–present
- Labels: rooArt; BMG; Nonzero
- Members: Peter Fenton; Jim Woff; Andy Marks
- Past members: Richard Andrew; John Fenton; Peter Archer

Crow are an Australian rock band that is best known for three albums released in the 1990s. Founded by songwriters Peter Fenton and Peter Archer in Sydney in 1986, Crow ceased all activity in 1999, only to begin playing again in 2007. In 2009, they recorded an album of new material. Mixed by Jim Moginie (Midnight Oil), the album was released in 2010.

In 1998, the Australian music magazine Juice labeled Crow the "best band in Australia since The Birthday Party". With releases on Phantom, Half A Cow, RooArt and BMG, Crow is widely acknowledged as influential in Australian music.

== History ==
=== 1988–1993: early years and My Kind of Pain ===
From 1988 to 1992 Crow was a notoriously shambolic affair that could easily derail through equipment failures. Bringing performances to a jolting stop. Driven by the nervy personalities of brothers Peter (guitar, vocals) and John (drums) and combined with the combustible bassist Jim Woff and lead guitarist Peter Archer, Crow was highly unpredictable. The original bass player and founding member was Paul Gormack, who left the band just prior to the recording of the debut album.

Crow recorded their debut album My Kind of Pain in Chicago in 1992 with Steve Albini (Big Black) as producer. The record was subsequently re-mixed by local Tim Whitten before release.

During that period, Crow supported many touring acts such as Straitjacket Fits, Pavement, Sebadoh and The Verlaines.

=== 1994–1999 ===
The band was signed by large local label RooArt who released their second album Li-Lo-ing in 1995. Guest musicians included Warren Ellis (Dirty Three) and Chris Abrahams (The Necks).

Richard Andrew (Underground Lovers, Registered Nurse) then replaced Andy Marks on drums. Extensive touring followed alongside bands such as Jeff Buckley.

Peter Archer then moved to Melbourne in 1996 to start a family and to pursue his own song writing vehicle Odette, leaving Crow without one of its real creators.

Though the extraordinary talents of Chris Abrahams and Michael Christie were added on keyboards a more stripped back sound evolved and this is very evident on their last album, Play with Love in 1998. Though the said album received industry kudos it was not the necessary amount of sales support needed for a major label like BMG. Peter Fenton continued as a solo artist, releasing In the Lovers Arms album in 2004.

=== 2007–2010: reformation ===
In early 2007, the band began rehearsing for a show at Marrickville's (Sydney) "Cad Factory" performance space. During that performance – which drew heavily from the band's early work – Peter Fenton indicated that the show was the beginning of renewed band activity. Former drummer Andy Marks' new band, the Child Detectives, debuted before Crow's performance.

In August 2008 Crow played a show with Melbourne band Hoss. This was filmed as part of the 'That Then, This Now' series of shows featuring seminal Aussie bands, with the show set to be released on DVD.

2010 saw the release of their new album, Arcane. It features the four original band members, Peter Archer (guitar and vocals), Peter Fenton (guitar and vocals), Jim Woff (bass) and John Fenton (drums).

=== 2010–present: Arcane and death of Richard Andrew ===
Arcane is the fourth Crow album, released in June 2010 on Nonzero Records. Mixed by Midnight Oil's Jim Moginie at Oceanic Studios, the album received very positive reviews. Darren Levin of Mess and Noise wrote: "They've got unfinished business to attend to, and based on this single alone, a whole lot more to say....'Ghost at the Crossroads' is truly up there among the band's best material. It's quintessential Crow, really: Those ominous opening chords; that perfect balance between light and shade; those spectral backing vocals in the chorus; Fenton's pointed, inward-looking gaze...It's like they've never left."

Richard Andrew, drummer in Crow's line-up before their split in 1999, died on 30 October 2024, after suffering from lung cancer. He was 58. Peter Archer died on 14 May 2026, at the age of 61.

== Members ==
- Peter Fenton – guitar and vocals
- Jim Woff – bass
- Andy Marks – drums

=== Former members ===
- Peter Archer – guitar and vocals
- Richard Andrew – drums
- Paul Gormack – bass
- Tina H Stevens – drums
- Paul Ritchard – drums
- John Fenton – drums
- Chris Baz – drums
- Michael Christie – piano and keyboards
- Chris Abrahams – piano and keyboards

== Discography ==
=== Albums ===
List of albums
Title	Details	Peak chart positions
Title	Details	AUS
My Kind of Pain	Released: February 1993; Label: Half a Cow (hac-19); Formats: CD, cassette	—
Li-lo-ing	Released: 1995; Label: Ra (2068300005); Formats: CD	—
Play with Love	Released: April 1998; Label: Ra, Sony BMG (74321569442); Formats: CD	—
Arcane	Released: June 2010; Label: Nonzero (NZ054); Formats: CD	—
Hold Sway	Released: July 2026; Label: Cheersquad	63

=== EPs ===
List of EPs
Title	Details
Sunburnt Throats and Happy Thunderclouds	Released: May 1990; Label: Phantom (PHMLP-8); Formats: LP, cassette
Crow	Released: May 1992; Label: Half a Cow (hac-12); Formats: CD
Railhead	Released: January 1993; Label: Half a Cow (hac-17); Formats: CD
The Helicon Days	Released: January 1994; Label: Half a Cow (hac-29); Formats: CD

== Awards and nominations ==
=== ARIA Music Awards ===
The ARIA Music Awards is an annual awards ceremony that recognises excellence, innovation, and achievement across all genres of Australian music. They commenced in 1987.

Year	Nominee / work	Award	Result	Ref.
1994	My Kind of Pain	Best Adult Alternative Album	Nominated	
