= Magic Lunchbox =

Australian rock band

- Origin: Sydney, Australia
- Genres: Rock; Alternative
- Years active: 1990s–present
- Labels: Nonzero Records (Australia)
- Members: Ernie Luney; Danny Nighttime; Rob Child; Kukulj; Lauren Freedom
- Past members: Bean Itsnaturale; Howie Howard
- Website: Official website

Magic Lunchbox are an original rock band from Sydney, Australia.

They have released three albums and one EP, most recently through Nonzero Records.

== Discography ==
=== Albums ===
- Dickheads & Rainbows
- What Time is the Orgy?
- Spastique

=== EPs ===
- The Yeeros Living Dangerously
