= Jamie Hutchings =

Australian musician

- Birth name: Jamie Buchanon Hutchings
- Born: 1971 (age 53–54)
- Origin: Sydney
- Genres: Alternative, Australian rock
- Instrument(s): Guitar, vocals
- Years active: 1993–present
- Labels: Nonzero; Laughing Outlaw Records
- Website: http://www.jamiehutchings.com

Jamie Buchanon Hutchings (born 1971, Sydney, Australia) is the lead singer-songwriter and guitarist for Australian band Bluebottle Kiss, who have released six albums, plus numerous EPs and singles. Hutchings has released three solo albums, The Golden Coach, His Imaginary Choir and Avalon Cassettes. Unlike Bluebottle Kiss albums, which Hutchings produces himself, His Imaginary Choir was co-produced with notable Australian producer Tony Dupe. He has produced three albums for fellow Sydney band Peabody one album for Sydney mood-blues band, The Maladies and in 2013 one for Mark Moldre (An Ear to the Earth – Laughing Outlaw Records). His most recent solo album, Avalon Cassettes, was released on Laughing Outlaw in early 2011. Following Avalon Cassettes, he formed another band, Infinity Broke and in 2014 released a new album, River Mirrors.

== Biography ==
From a musical family, Jamie's father, Lee Hutchings, is a professional musician (saxophone for The Flying Circus) and two of his siblings, Scott Hutchings and Sophie Hutchings, are frequent collaborators.
