= Claremont Road Ground =

Former football ground in London, England

Claremont Road
- Interactive map of Claremont Road
- Location: Cricklewood, UK
- Coordinates: 51°33′59″N 0°13′6″W
- Seating type: Individual backed seats in stand, bench seats all other areas
- Type: Outdoor Sports

Construction
- Built: 1926
- Opened: September 18, 1926
- Demolished: 2006

Tenants
- Hendon Football Club; Fash FC; London Broncos

The Claremont Road Ground was a former football ground in Cricklewood, UK. It was the home ground for Hendon Football Club for 81 years before being demolished in 2006.

== History ==
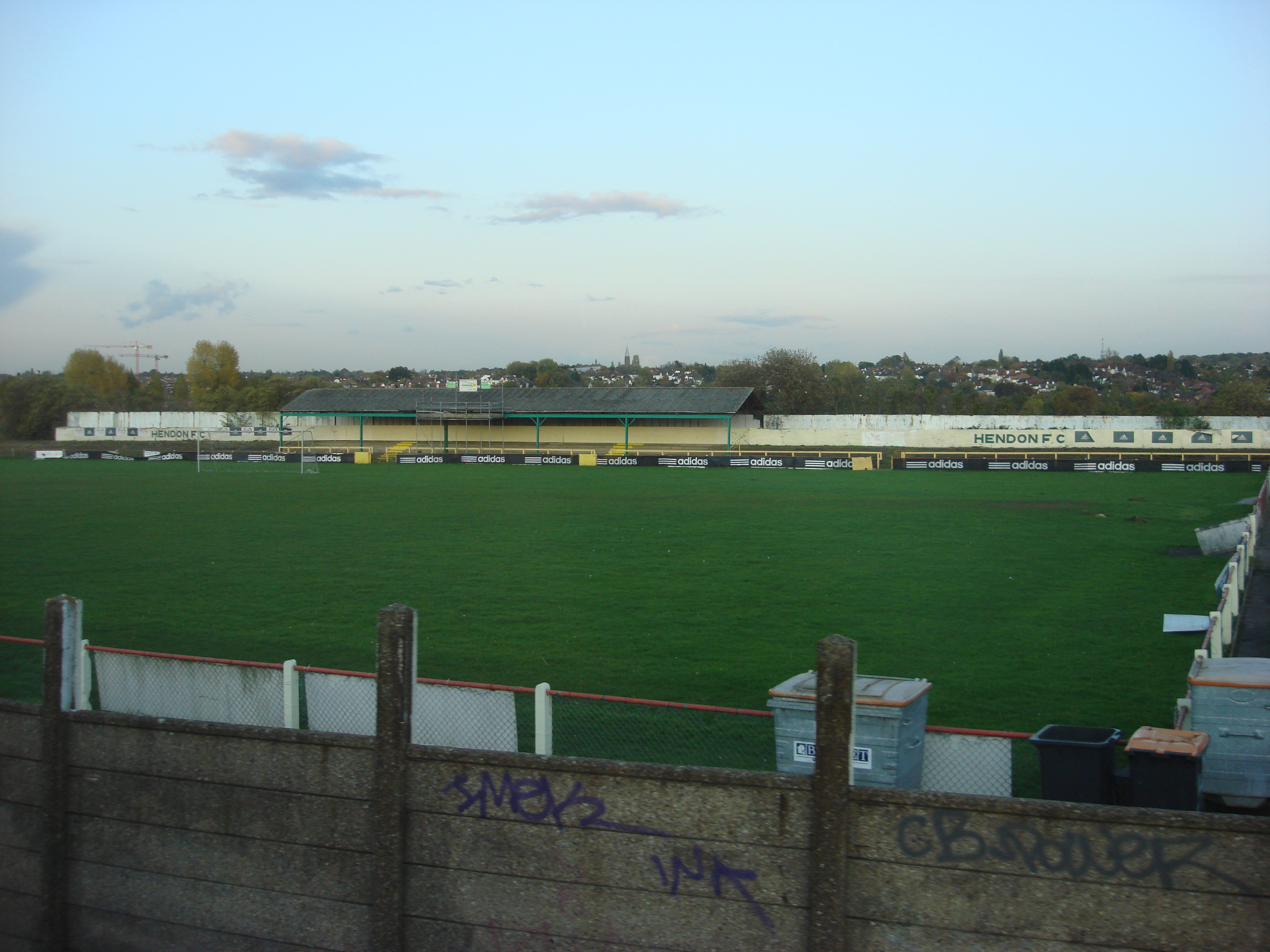
Claremont Road

Based in the suburb of Cricklewood, within the London Borough of Barnet, at a ground simply known by the local road name, Claremont Road. The ground was owned by Hendon F.C. and was officially opened on 18 September 1926 and was used before an FA Cup tie with Berkhamsted. William Harbrow Ltd constructed the stand and the original bench seats were only replaced in 1993 when the club received some bucket seats from Watford's Vicarage Road. Claremont Road became such a popular venue it went on to host three England Amateur International matches and a Great Britain v West Germany qualifying match for the Olympic Games. The attendance record of 9,000 was set for the visit of Northampton Town in a FA Cup tie in 1952.

In the 1990s, Claremont Road served as an occasional home for the nomadic rugby league team then known as London Crusaders as well as the home ground for reality TV football club Fash FC. It was also a popular location for production companies, with over 30 films, television programmes and adverts being shot there.

Hendon chairman Ivor Arbiter put in hand plans to move the club from the increasingly decrepit Claremont Road ground. The land where the stadium, clubhouse and banqueting suites stand was put on the market, to be sold for housing, while the plans were put in place to move the club to the Barnet Copthall Athletics Stadium. The move, however, stalled for a number of reasons, the most compelling of which was a deed of covenant preventing the stadium and associated buildings from being used for any other purpose than football or being returned to park land (the ground is surrounded by Claremont Park). The validity of the covenant, regarding its relevance in the modern era was challenged by Barnet Council and the matter is in the hands of the Lands Registry Commission, who will make the final decision on whether the covenant can be lifted. The cost of a move to Barnet Copthall was significantly underestimated, and, instead of £300,000 as originally thought, the figure was subsequently estimated to exceed £500,000, causing the planned move to be abandoned.

The ground was sold to a property developer for approaching £20 million. It had been assumed that the last match would have taken place in April 2006 but the fans and the club enjoyed a stay of execution until September 2008 when after 81 years, the club was forced out. After the closure of Claremont Road, Hendon's home games were played at Harrow Borough's Earlsmead ground, Northwood's Chestnut Avenue, Staines Town's Wheatsheaf Road and Wembley's Vale Farm.
