= Nonzero Records =

- Founded: 2001
- Founder: Nick Carr
- Distributor: Shock Records
- Genre: Various
- Country of origin: Australia
- Location: Sydney
- Official website: Nonzero Record

Nonzero Records is an independent record label based in Sydney, Australia, dedicated to supporting the Sydney independent music scene and select overseas artists. To date the label has produced over 50 releases for twenty artists.

Nonzero was founded by long-time music fan, Nick Carr, who, inspired by labels such as Citadel, started his own label to provide Bluebottle Kiss with a label to release the band's fourth studio album, Revenge Is Slow, in March 2002. The album won the band new respect and a much larger national and international audience, the album was their first overseas release in the United States on the In Music We Trust label and in the United Kingdom on Laughing Outaw Records. The album spawned three singles, "Gangsterland", "Hasten The Blo" and "Ounce Of Your Cruelty", with the latter also gaining release in the UK on the Sugarshack label.

Nonzero subsequently released the debut albums by The Devoted Few, Sleepless (16 September 2002) and Peabody's album, Professional Againster (30 September 2002).

The label quickly expanded, primarily focused on recording and releasing local Sydney rock bands, Nonzero has also provided Australian releases for American alt.country band, Richmond Fontaine and Dutch folk/rock band Big Low.

2006 saw the release of the Bluebottle Kiss' sixth studio album, Doubt Seeds a 20-track double CD, which included extensive liner notes by Carr. The album received critical acclaim for the band. In June 2010 Nonzero released Crow's album, Aracane, the band's first album in over twelve years.

== Artist roster ==
- Arbuckle
- Big Low
- Bluebottle Kiss
- Crow
- Death Mattel
- The Devoted Few
- The Exiles
- The Great Dividing Range
- Jamie Hutchings
- Magic Lunchbox
- Muzzy Pep
- The Null Set
- Peabody
- The Reservations
- Richmond Fontaine
- Spurs for Jesus
- Jed Whitey

== See also ==
- List of record labels
