= Tim Lovejoy =

English television presenter (b.1968)

- Born: Timothy Paul Lovejoy; 28 March 1968 (age 58); Northwood, London, England
- Occupation: Television presenter
- Years active: 1994–present
- Spouse: Jade Lovejoy (m. 2002; div. 2006)
- Partner(s): Tamsin Greenway (2012–2016)
- Children: 3
- Website: Official website

Timothy Paul Lovejoy (born 28 March 1968) is an English television presenter best known for hosting Saturday morning football programme Soccer AM with Helen Chamberlain for over a decade and BT Sports Panel on Saturday mornings. He presents Sunday Brunch on Channel 4.

== Career ==
=== Early career ===
Lovejoy began his television career as a covering VJ for MTV. He then joined Planet 24, working as a researcher for The Big Breakfast before going on to produce the show.

Richard Marson's book celebrating fifty years of Blue Peter also comments that Lovejoy auditioned as a presenter in the 1990s.

=== Soccer AM ===
Lovejoy began hosting and producing football show Soccer AM on Sky Television in 1996, with Helen Chamberlain. He remained on the show for eleven years.

Following the success of Soccer AM, Lovejoy became a radio DJ, joining Xfm before moving to Virgin Radio, where he briefly presented a Sunday-afternoon show. He also hosted Tim Lovejoy and the Allstars, a show similar to TFI Friday, on Sky 1, where he chatted with celebrities, between performances from a variety of bands.

In 2006, Lovejoy was appointed as the co-host of the car show Fifth Gear on Five for two series. He spoke openly about how difficult he found his time on the programme and described himself as feeling like a 'charlatan' during an appearance on the Fuelling Around podcast. The episode is almost an hour long but the timestamps 2:30-9:08 cover him talking about his experiences of working on the motoring show alongside podcast co-host Vicki Butler-Henderson.

Lovejoy announced on 5 June 2007 that he would be leaving Soccer AM after eleven years.

=== Post-Soccer AM ===
Following his departure from Soccer AM, Lovejoy joined BBC Radio 5 Live as the Wednesday night host of its football phone-in show 6-0-6 though he was dropped in 2009. He also presented the UK edition of Five's Major League Soccer magazine show David Beckham's Soccer USA

In 2008, Lovejoy launched an internet TV channel called Channel Bee. As of 20 November 2009, the website has been taken down.

In February 2010, Lovejoy guest presented an episode of Blue Peter 12 years after auditioning for the show. A clip of Lovejoy's original audition was shown during the programme.

Lovejoy participated in the 2011 series of Celebrity MasterChef.

=== Something for the Weekend ===
From 2006 until 2012, Lovejoy co-presented the Sunday morning TV programme Something for the Weekend on BBC2, opposite chef Simon Rimmer and various female co-hosts including Louise Redknapp (previous co-hosts include Amanda Hamilton and Caroline Flack).

The show centred on cookery, with celebrity guests assisting in the preparation of easy recipes, and viewers encouraged to make the same dishes at home. It also had regular segments on cocktails, gadgets, and 'guess the year' based on old pop and news clips.

It was reported in January 2012 that the show, which in 2011 ran as a 46 × 90-minute series, had fallen foul of the BBC's Delivering Quality First cuts because of its unfortunate scheduling on BBC 2 during the day, despite consistently high ratings. The show ended in March, and an online campaign was launched to save the programme.

=== Sunday Brunch and Daily Brunch ===
On 25 March 2012, Lovejoy and Rimmer began hosting a new show for Channel 4, Sunday Brunch. The series started one week after the final episode of Something for the Weekend.

In 2014, Lovejoy and Rimmer presented a short-lived spin-off series called Daily Brunch, airing Monday to Fridays from 10 am. The show lasted for just eight weeks.

=== BT Sport ===
In August 2013, Lovejoy began hosting the Saturday morning BT Sports Panel (BTSP) show of predictions, previews and reviews – a format similar to his former Soccer AM days.

== Books ==
The two other books are linked to his TV series; Lazy Brunch, 'co-authored' with chef Simon Rimmer (Quadrille Publishing, London, 2008) and Something for the Weekend: 60 fabulous recipes for a Lazy Brunch, also co-authored with Rimmer (Quadrille Publishing, London, 2009). His name is also associated with two DVDs on football: Lovejoy and Redknapp's Best of Football (2007) and Tim Lovejoy's Football Managers Uncut – A Guide to the Game's Greatest Gaffers (2008).

His book Lovejoy on Football was not critically well received. Taylor Parkes in monthly football magazine When Saturday Comes described it as "tedious in the extreme ... Hopelessly banal and nauseatingly self-assured, smirkingly unfunny ... There's something sinister here, too: beamingly positive, thrilled by wealth, too pleased with himself to ask awkward questions."

== Podcast ==
In 2017 Lovejoy launched Dear Lovejoy, originally an agony uncle podcast, but later evolving into a series of interviews.

== Personal life ==
Lovejoy married Jade in 2002 and has twin girls from the marriage, born in 2002. Lovejoy was in a relationship with English netball player Tamsin Greenway. She gave birth to the couple's first child together, a daughter, on 22 May 2013. In May 2016, Lovejoy announced that this relationship had ended. Lovejoy lives in Chiswick, London.

In 2009, Lovejoy was named by The Daily Telegraph as the 49th most eligible bachelor in Britain.
