= Greens (English restaurant) =

Restaurant in West Didsbury, England

- Interactive map of Greens

Restaurant information
- Established: 1990; 36 years ago
- Chef: Simon Rimmer
- Location: West Didsbury, Manchester, England
- Coordinates: 53°25′39″N 2°14′23″W
- Website: https://greensrestaurants.co.uk/

Greens was a restaurant at 41 to 43 Lapwing Lane in West Didsbury. An existing vegetarian restaurant, Greens was reopened in 1990 by Simon Rimmer and Simon Connolly after they spotted it in a pub, with Rimmer becoming its chef after discovering that they could not afford to hire someone. A sister restaurant opened in Sale, Greater Manchester, in July 2022, but both closed in 2024 as a result of that decade's cost-of-living crisis.

The Didsbury branch was awarded an AA Rosette in 1992, became the first purely vegetarian restaurant to appear in The Good Food Guide, and has appeared on a number of 'best of' lists. Writers for SquareMeal, Time Out, and Manchester Evening News also gave the restaurant positive write-ups. Its staff have included Eddie Shepherd, who set up a successful vegetarian restaurant of his own, and MasterChef winner Simon Wood, who spent a period cooking there between winning and setting up his own restaurant.

== Background ==
Simon Rimmer met his business partner Simon Connolly while working at a café in Didsbury; one was a waiter, while the other worked front of house. In 1990, Rimmer was working as a part-time designer and as a lecturer, and Connolly was working as a restaurant hotel manager; at the time, Didsbury was not a particularly pleasant place to live, with Rimmer using a 2024 piece in ManchestersFinest.com to observe that, at the time, drug deals behind the car park of the nearby Metropolitan gastropub were commonplace.

While eating a Nepalese curry and drinking beer, Rimmer and Connolly noticed a small vegetarian café, and wondered if it could be converted into a proper vegetarian restaurant; by chance, Rimmer happened to drive past the next day as a 'for sale' sign was going up, and the pair bought the restaurant twelve weeks later, using £2,000 they had between them and £40,000 from the bank. At the time, they were under the impression that they would have enough money to employ a chef and that they could spend their time chatting up women; having discovered that they did not, they tossed a coin to see who would learn to cook, which Rimmer lost.

== History ==
The restaurant, which the pair kept vegetarian in order to keep its existing clientele, was opened in 1990 and used the strapline "terrifying carnivores since 1990". It was successful enough that Rimmer and Connolly could afford to open other restaurants; Rimmer told The Caterer that he was declining 600 bookings a week. He later mounted a successful media career and published several cookbooks. The restaurant closed for a month in 2007; when it reopened, it had almost doubled in size. Rimmer later opened a sister restaurant of the same name in Stanley Square in Sale, Greater Manchester in July 2022, with the kitchen a converted bank vault, and the interiors inspired by The Butcher's Daughter, an American plant-based restaurant; upon opening, the branch attracted attention on social media for its use of unisex public toilets.

The West Didsbury restaurant announced its immediate closure in January 2024 after the landlord increased rent by 35% and its energy costs quintupled. The closure came within a challenging period for restaurateurs, with eight restaurants closing every day, and later that month, Rimmer and several other restaurants called for Rishi Sunak, the then-Prime Minister of the United Kingdom, to halve value-added tax. Sacha Lord stated that the closure was "a stark example that even in regions of relatively high disposable income, the financial pressures on small businesses are simply no longer viable especially when household budgets are being squeezed more than ever by food price inflation or rising energy costs". On 17 September that year, Greens announced that their Sale branch would close as well as the business had become untenable. The branch's closure followed that month's administration of TGI Fridays and the closure of three further Manchester restaurants.

== Reception ==
Greens was awarded an AA Rosette in 1992 and retained it until its closure. It became the first purely vegetarian restaurant to appear in The Good Food Guide; by the time of its temporary 2007 closure, it was one of six. Jonathan Schofield of Confidentials.com visited Greens in March 2015 and noted that Rimmer "provides clever vegetarian food with a bit of fun added in". SquareMeal described Greens as "arguably the North's leading vegetarian restaurant" in January 2019 and found the atmosphere "buzzy and laid-back".

The Daily Telegraph listed it as one of the "top restaurants for vegetarians in the UK" in May 2019 and as one of the "16 best restaurants in Manchester" in April 2023. Rob Martin used a May 2021 Time Out review to describe dining at the restaurant in its early days "felt a bit like being invited to dine with a really sophisticated friend's family; slightly bohemian but very professional with two lovely blokes at the helm", noted that "the food was a revelation for many used to veggie meals consisting of just lentils and something mushy", and that the restaurant remained "the delightful experience it always has been, somehow still managing to feel like you're in someone's home".

Ria Ghey of Manchesterworld.uk wrote in October 2023 that the "eclectic interior of Parisian-inspired artwork and frill-tastic lamp gave a welcoming vibe befitting a bustling neighbourhood restaurant". Dianne Bourne of Manchester Evening News was moved to visit the Sale branch in late January 2024 by the closure of the Didsbury restaurant and described her experience as "inventive and playful"; her review, which called for her readers to use their favourite local cafés or restaurants or lose them, prompted a disgruntled reader to complain that nobody in her town could afford to eat out any more.

== Notable alumni ==
- Eddie Shepherd spent a couple of years working there after moving back to Manchester around fifteen years before it closed and was offered his old job back after experiencing poor treatment by a subsequent employer. He later set up The Walled Gardens in Whalley Range, Manchester, a vegetarian restaurant subsequently listed in the We're Smart Green Guide's list of the top 100 vegetarian restaurants in the world.
- Simon Wood, who won the 2015 series of MasterChef, worked at Greens for period shortly after winning before setting up his own restaurant, Wood.
