= Sunday Brunch =

Sunday morning television series, broadcast on Channel 4

- Genre: Cookery; Talk show
- Directed by: Dave Skinner; Lewis Wright; Nick Harris; Tim Verrinder
- Presented by: Tim Lovejoy; Simon Rimmer; Miquita Oliver; Yinka Bokinni
- Country of origin: United Kingdom
- Original language: English

Production
- Producers: Isabel Forte; Erin McPartland; Caitlin Cowdry; Murray James
- Camera setup: Multi-camera
- Running time: 120–180 minutes (inc. adverts)
- Production company: Banijay UK (Note: Produced by Darlow Smithson Productions (DSP) since 2024; the programme has been previously produced by Princess Productions (2012-2018), Remarkable Entertainment (2018-2023) and RDF Television (2023-2024))

Original release
- Network: Channel 4
- Release: 25 March 2012 – present

Related
- Daily Brunch

Sunday Brunch is a British television programme presented by Tim Lovejoy and Simon Rimmer. It is broadcast live on Channel 4 on Sunday mornings and features cookery and interviews with celebrity guests.

== Format ==
The programme began on 25 March 2012. It was first announced by Channel 4 in February 2012 after the BBC series Something for the Weekend ended its seven-year run due to budget cuts. This is the same presenting team as the BBC show, with the exception of Louise Redknapp and Amanda Hamilton.

The show runs live for three hours, including advertisements, which is 90 minutes longer than Something for the Weekend at the end of its run. It initially was broadcast for two hours including advertisements from 10:00am to 12 midday, but from 19 May 2013 was expanded to three hours from 9:30am to 12:30pm. In 2025 the show was moved to run from 10am to 1pm, starting on 5 January.

Each programme features: Simon Rimmer cooking with Tim Lovejoy except for the episodes where Tim was out for a back operation and Johnny Vegas stood in. It also features the week's guests; highlights from television and film; interviews with guests; drink tasting with an expert, usually Rebecca Seal; a trend round-up segment with an expert; and the 'Sunday Brunch Playlist', which is a selection of music videos chosen by the presenters and guests.

The show was not broadcast on 22 March 2020 due to the COVID-19 pandemic in the United Kingdom. Instead in its place, Channel 4 aired episodes of Food Unwrapped, Come Dine with Me and Ramsay's Kitchen Nightmares USA. Sunday Brunch resumed the following week with the presenters hosting the show from their respective homes via video link. The series eventually returned to the studio on 24 May 2020.

On 11 and 18 September 2022 the show was not broadcast due to the Death and state funeral of Elizabeth II.

== Daily Brunch ==
Daily Brunch with Ocado was a spin-off of Sunday Brunch, presented by Lovejoy and Rimmer. It was broadcast live on Channel 4 every weekday morning for 60 minutes. Daily Brunch followed a similar format of Sunday Brunch, with cookery and interviews with celebrity guests.

On 29 September 2014, it was announced that Rimmer and Lovejoy would host a new spin-off series from Sunday Brunch. The show began on 13 October 2014 and aired daily at 10am for 40 episodes.
