= Simon Rimmer =

English chef

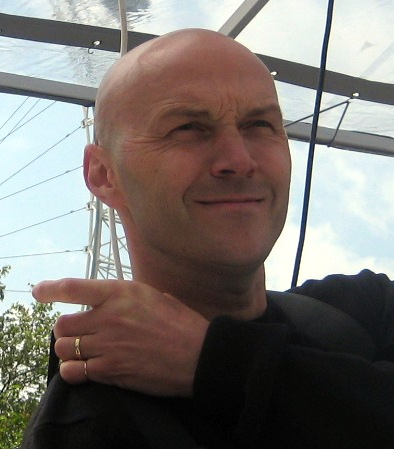
- Rimmer in May 2010
- Born: Simon Peter Rimmer; 5 May 1963 (age 63); Wallasey, Wirral, England
- Occupation: Chef
- Years active: 1990–present

Simon Peter Rimmer (born 5 May 1963) is an English celebrity chef, best known for his on-screen partnership with Tim Lovejoy.

== Early life ==
Simon Peter Rimmer was born in Wallasey. (Note: Wallasey was in Cheshire when he was born and did not become part of Merseyside until he was 11 years old.)

== Career ==
Rimmer originally studied fashion and textile design, and later taught himself to cook. In 1990, he bought Greens, a vegetarian restaurant in West Didsbury. It closed in 2024. He opened his second restaurant, Earle, in Hale in October 2006, though this was sold to a local restaurateur in 2016. In 2013, Rimmer served as a judge for British Sausage Week, helping to choose the winners and promote the event.

Rimmer's television career began with Granada Breeze before appearing regularly on programmes including This Morning, The One Show, The Gadget Show and Pointless Celebrities. He has presented Making a Meal of It for BBC Two, Win It, Cook It, Tricks of the Restaurant Trade, Eat the Week with Iceland and Secrets of Our Favourite Snacks for Channel 4 and Breaking Into Tesco for Channel 5. Rimmer is best known for his work alongside Tim Lovejoy presenting Something for the Weekend on BBC Two between 2006 and 2012 and Sunday Brunch, a show with a similar format on Channel 4.

Rimmer has also appeared as a contestant on various TV shows. In 2006, he pitted his cooking talents against other skilled chefs on the first series of Great British Menu; losing in the North of England heat to Marcus Wareing. In 2008, he appeared on Celebrity Mastermind, choosing 'The History of Tranmere Rovers' as a specialist subject. In August 2017, it was confirmed that Rimmer would take part in the fifteenth series of Strictly Come Dancing, partnered with Karen Clifton. The pair were eliminated in week six.

Rimmer's first book, The Accidental Vegetarian, was published in October 2004. His second book, Rebel Cook, was published in October 2006. His third book Lazy Brunch came out in 2008, co-written with Lovejoy and based on a feature in Something from the Weekend. In 2009, Rimmer published his fourth book, The Seasoned Vegetarian.

Simon started to present a show on Gold Radio (British Radio Station) Saturday mornings 9-12pm in January 2025

== Personal life ==
Rimmer supports Liverpool F.C. and was present during the 1989 Hillsborough disaster.

== Filmography ==
Television

Year	Title	Role	Notes
2006–2012	Something for the Weekend	Co-presenter	With Tim Lovejoy
2012—	Sunday Brunch	Co-presenter	10 series; with Tim Lovejoy
2014	Daily Brunch	Co-presenter	1 series; with Tim Lovejoy
2014	Win It, Cook It	Presenter	1 series
2016—	Tricks of the Restaurant Trade	Co-presenter	3 series; with Kate Quilton, Adam Pearson and Sophie Morgan
2017—	Eat the Week with Iceland	Presenter	1 series
2017	Secrets of Our Favourite Snacks	Co-presenter	With Sophie Morgan
2017	Strictly Come Dancing	Participant	Series 15
2018	Britain's Favourite Food	Presenter	Two-part series
