= David Beckham's Soccer USA =

Football highlights and discussion panel show in the UK

- Starring: Tim Lovejoy, Natalie Pinkham
- Countries of origin: United Kingdom, United States
- Original language: English
- No. of episodes: 13

Production
- Running time: 30-45 minutes

Original release
- Network: Five; Fox Soccer Channel
- Release: 25 July – 17 October 2007

David Beckham's Soccer USA was an association football highlights and general discussion show presented by Tim Lovejoy and produced and broadcast in the United Kingdom by Five. The show began following David Beckham's move to Los Angeles Galaxy, and Beckham often contributed to the show in the form of interviews. Each week there was a special guest in the studio, usually a British sports personality, to whom Lovejoy chatted about their career and their views on Major League Soccer. A slightly different version of the show hosted by Natalie Pinkham and completely devoid of any content derived from British studio footage was broadcast in the United States on Fox Soccer Channel.

Several regular features aside from MLS highlights were present in every show. One of these features was a "translation" of American commentary, called "How to Speak U.S. Commentator". This segment provided definitions of slang used by commentators which differed from that used in Britain. Viewers were also invited to choose an MLS team to support and e-mail their choice to the show, from which polls were collected, determining the nation's favourite teams.

== Running gags ==
The show was presented in a light-hearted manner and contains a variety of running gags which run over several weeks, such as:

1. At the beginning of each show, Lovejoy introduced himself as a Chelsea and Kansas Wizards fan, after which he said "Go Wizards". A silver curving flash then appeared across the screen and the presenter moved his hand in the direction of the flash as it moved across the screen. The flash and Lovejoy's hand were almost never co-ordinated, adding a comic element.
2. Many of the guests referred to Scottish player Paul Dalglish, who played for the Houston Dynamo, which led Lovejoy to suggest the title of the programme be changed to 'Paul Dalglish's Soccer USA'.
3. Lovejoy sometimes gave an update on one of the MLS clubs, and called it, for example, 'Houston Update' or 'New England Update'. After he is finished, he then went on to the 'Dallas update', and talked not about FC Dallas, the MLS team, but the soap opera Dallas.
4. Lovejoy would often comment on and show a clip of player Logan Pause followed by Tim pretending to have been paused by standing very still for around 5 seconds.

== Comparison ==
- The American version was hosted by Natalie Pinkham, who was traditionally out on location at various Major League Soccer related events. The British version was hosted by Tim Lovejoy in a studio.
- The American version was presented as a serious highlight show, featuring game footage with all English highlight packages narrated by JP Dellacamera. The British version was presented as a lighthearted educational look at Major League Soccer and soccer in the United States in general. The British version contained a highlight package featuring the original broadcast commentators, sometimes in English, sometimes in Spanish, depending on the source of the original broadcast.
