= The Spa of Embarrassing Illnesses =

The Spa of Embarrassing Illnesses is a ten-part television series presented and co-produced by nutritionist Amanda Hamilton on UK Style TV related to Embarrassing Bodies. The show revolves around a group of eight people trying to overcome a range of health conditions through alternative medicine as well as psychological counseling. Three series have aired, with filming in Andalusia, Turkey, and the French Alps.
