= Unisex public toilet =

Public toilets not separated by sex

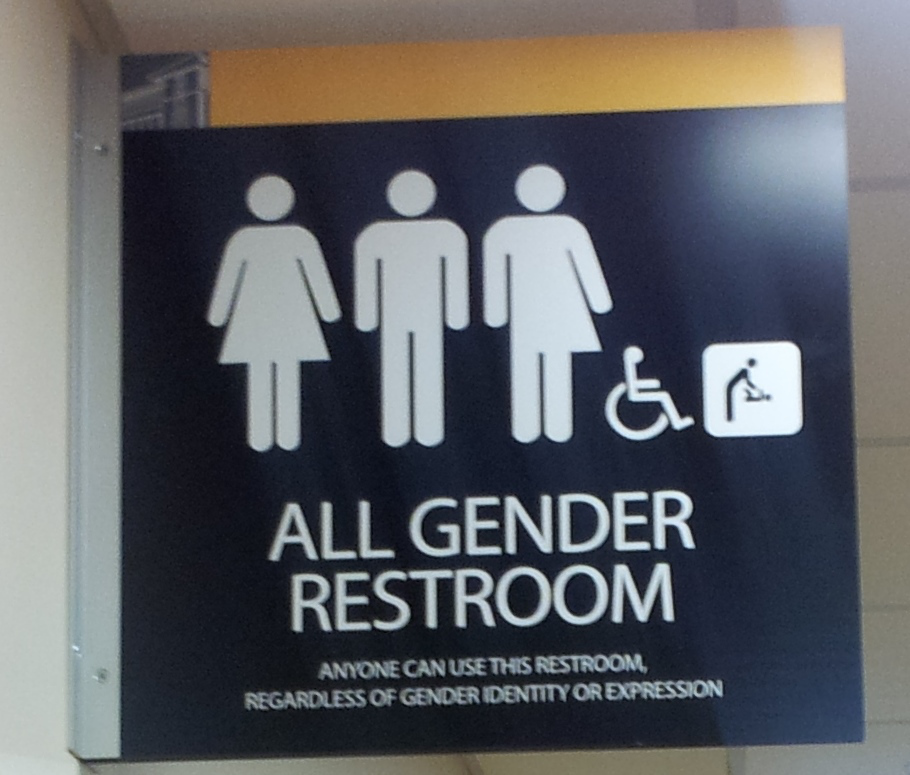
Pictogram for a unisex toilet in Saint Paul, Minnesota, 2015

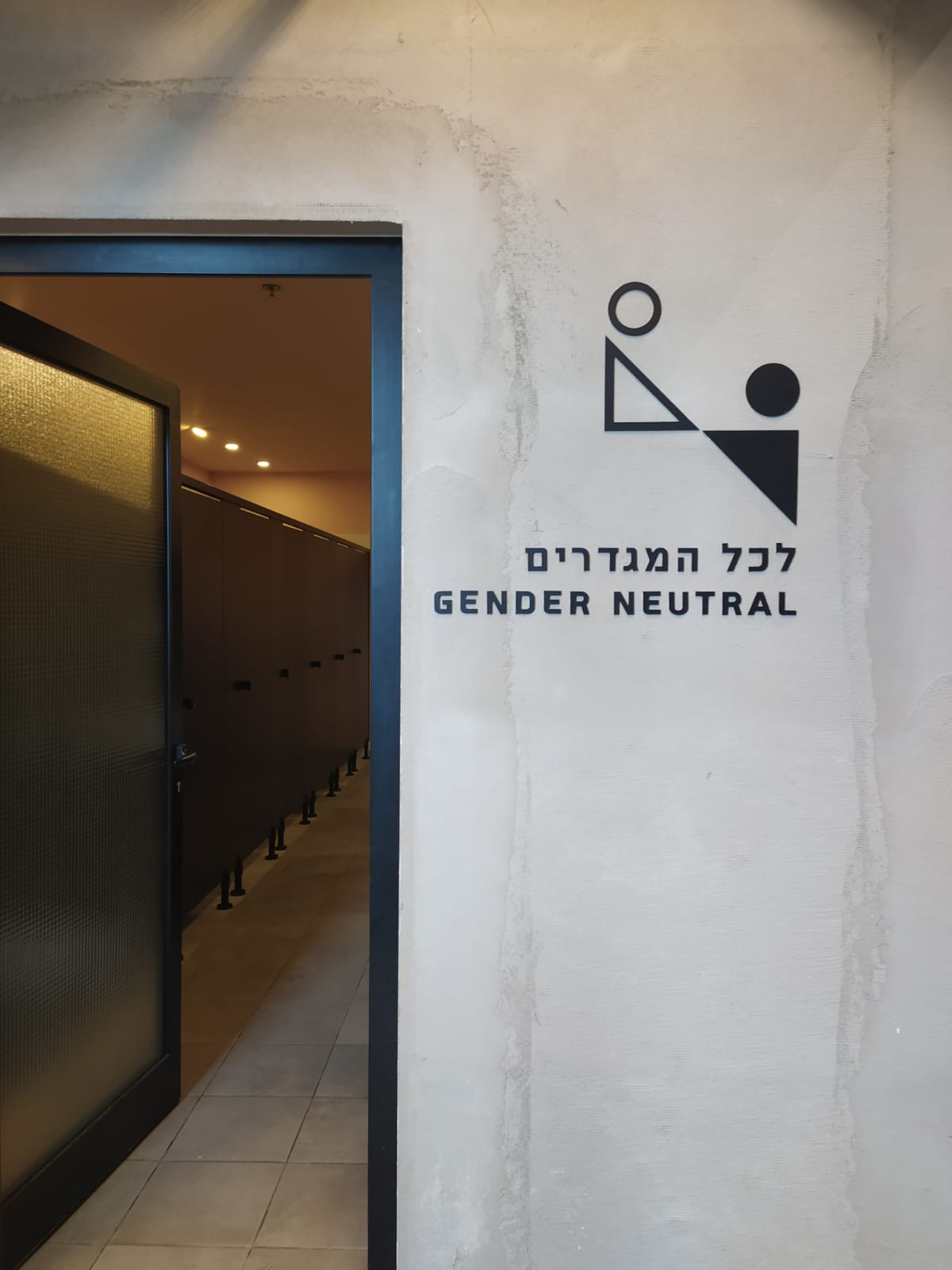
Gender-neutral toilet in the "Design Terminal" compound in Bat-Yam, Israel

Unisex public toilets (also referred to as gender-inclusive, gender-neutral, mixed-sex or all-gender, or without any prefix at all) are public toilets that are not separated by sex or gender.

Unisex public toilets take different forms: they may be single-occupancy facilities where only one single room or enclosure is provided; or multi-user facilities which are open to all and where users may either share sinks in an open area or each have their own sink in their private cubicle, stall or room. Unisex public toilets may either replace single-sex toilets, or may be an addition to single-sex toilets.

Unisex public toilets can be used by people of any sex or gender identity. Such toilet facilities can benefit transgender populations and those outside of the gender binary, and can reduce bathroom queues through more balanced occupation. Sex separation in public toilets (also called sex segregation) as opposed to unisex toilets is the separation of public toilets into male and female; this separation is sometimes enforced by local laws and building codes. Key differences between male and female public toilets in most Western countries include the presence of urinals for men and boys, and sanitary bins for the disposal of menstrual hygiene products for women and girls. (Sanitary bins may easily be included in the setup of unisex public toilets.)

The historical purposes of sex-separated toilets in the United States and Europe, as well as the timing of their appearance, are disputed amongst scholars. The earliest laws enshrining sex segregation were deeply rooted in the separate spheres movement, which pushed the idea that men belonged in the public sphere and women in the private sphere. However some argue that the informal convention of sex segregation that predates any laws existed to ensure safety and privacy. Some women's groups hold that unisex public toilets will be less safe for women than public toilets that are separated by sex; however, some experts say that with the appropriate design interventions, these spaces can improve the safety of all users and reduce the disproportionately long wait times females face in sex-separated public washrooms.

The push for gender-neutral bathrooms is driven at least in part by the transgender community to protect against harassment and violence against this population. Unisex public toilets may benefit a range of people with or without special needs (e.g. people with disabilities, the elderly, and anyone who needs the help of someone of another gender or sex), as well as parents who need to help their infant or toddler with using the toilet.

== Terminology ==
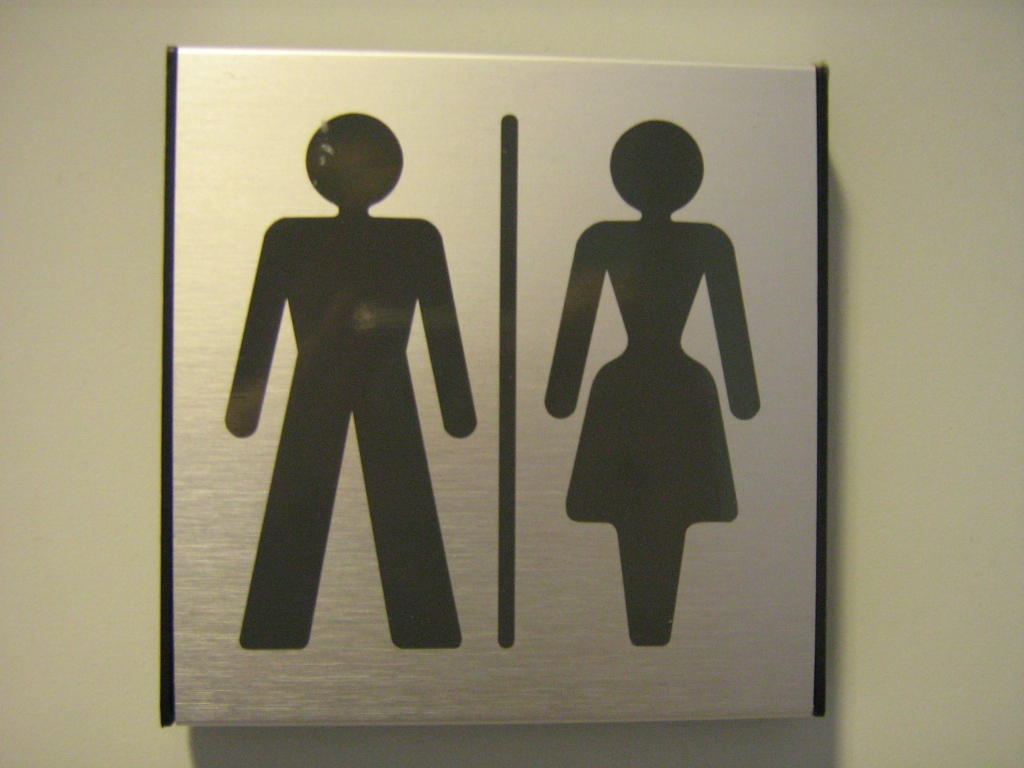
Gender-neutral toilet sign at department of sociology, University of Gothenburg, Gothenburg, Sweden

Several alternative terms are in use for unisex public toilets. Some favor all-gender toilets, gender-neutral toilets, gender-free toilets or all-user toilets or just toilet. The "Public Toilet Advocacy Toolkit" by the NGO Public Hygiene Lets Us Stay Human (PHLUSH) in Portland, Oregon (United States) from 2015 uses the term "all-gender". More recently, they have changed to the term "all user". However, some object to the term "gender-neutral" and similar terms, believing that neither the spaces nor terms are truly neutral. They also object to the replacement of the word "sex" with "gender". Such people often express a preference for the term "mixed-sex". But whatever one calls them, these are toilets which can (in theory) be used by anybody, regardless of sex or gender identity or presentation.

The opposite of unisex toilets is referred to as either "sex-separated" or "sex-segregated" toilets, or "conventional public toilets" (since sex separation is currently mostly the norm on the global level). In the United States, some scholars have used the term "sex separation".

== Designs ==
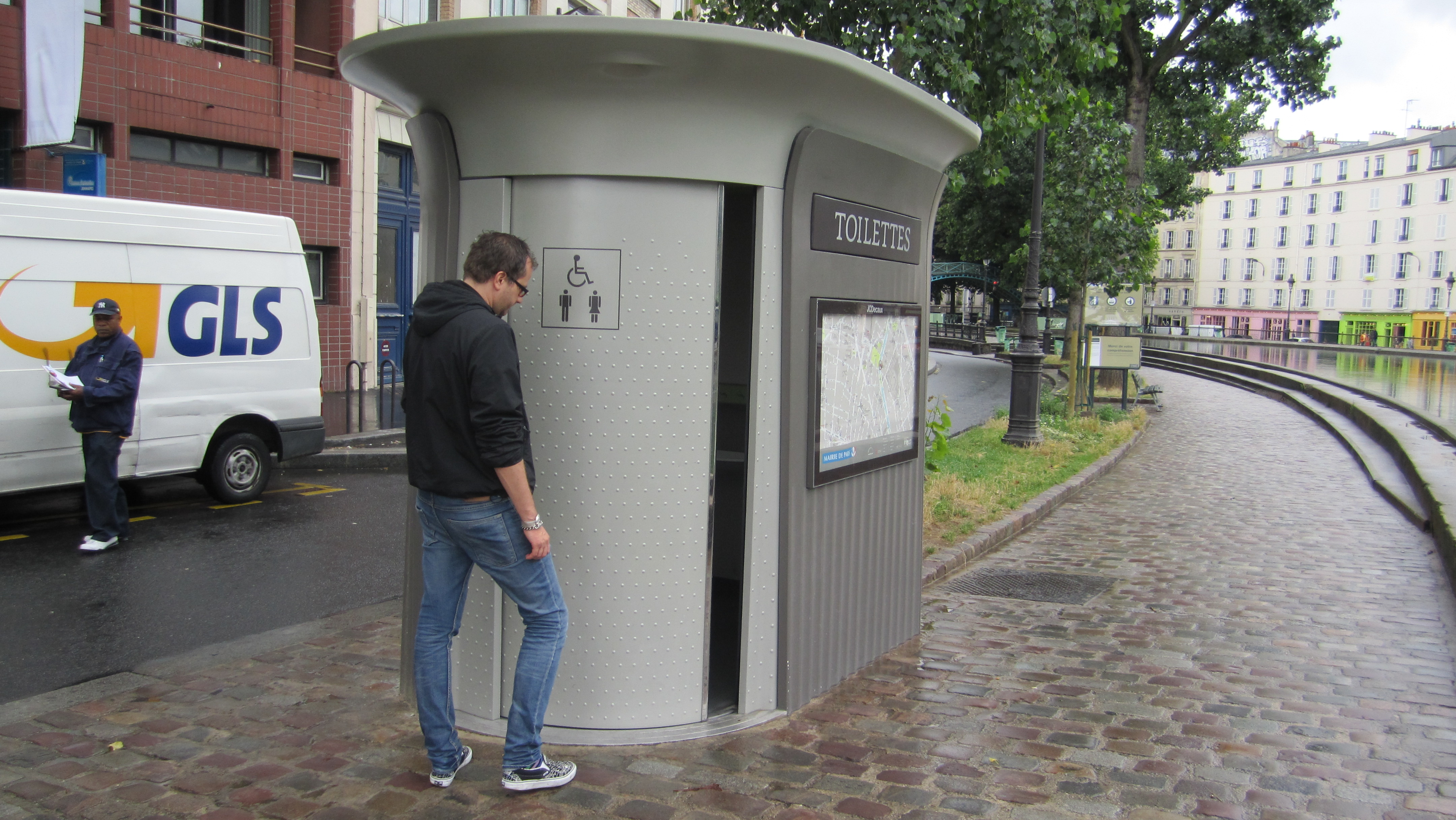
Unisex public toilet on a street in Paris, France

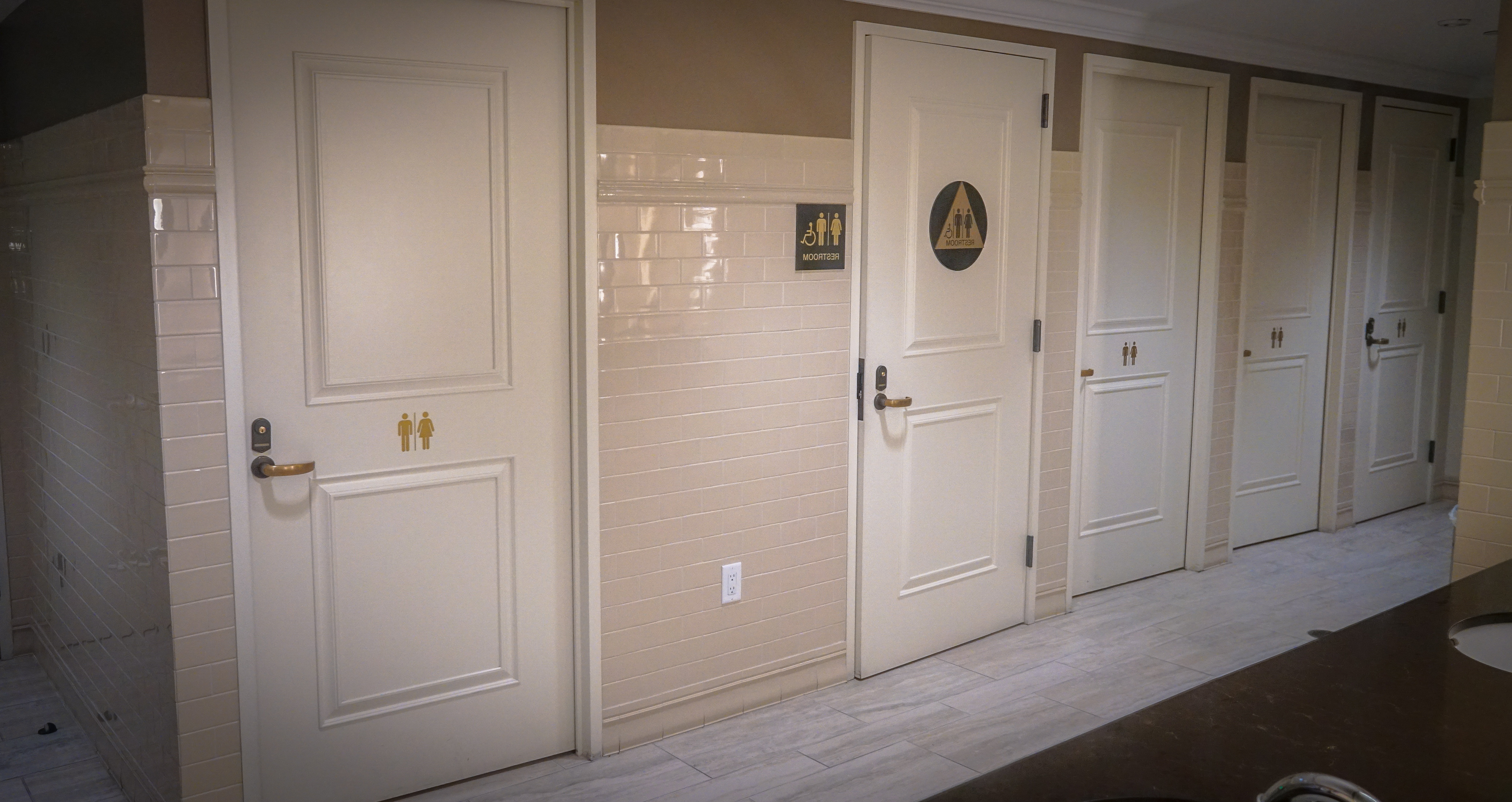
Unisex public toilet at Federal Reserve Bank in San Francisco, US. The sinks in the foreground are shared by all users.

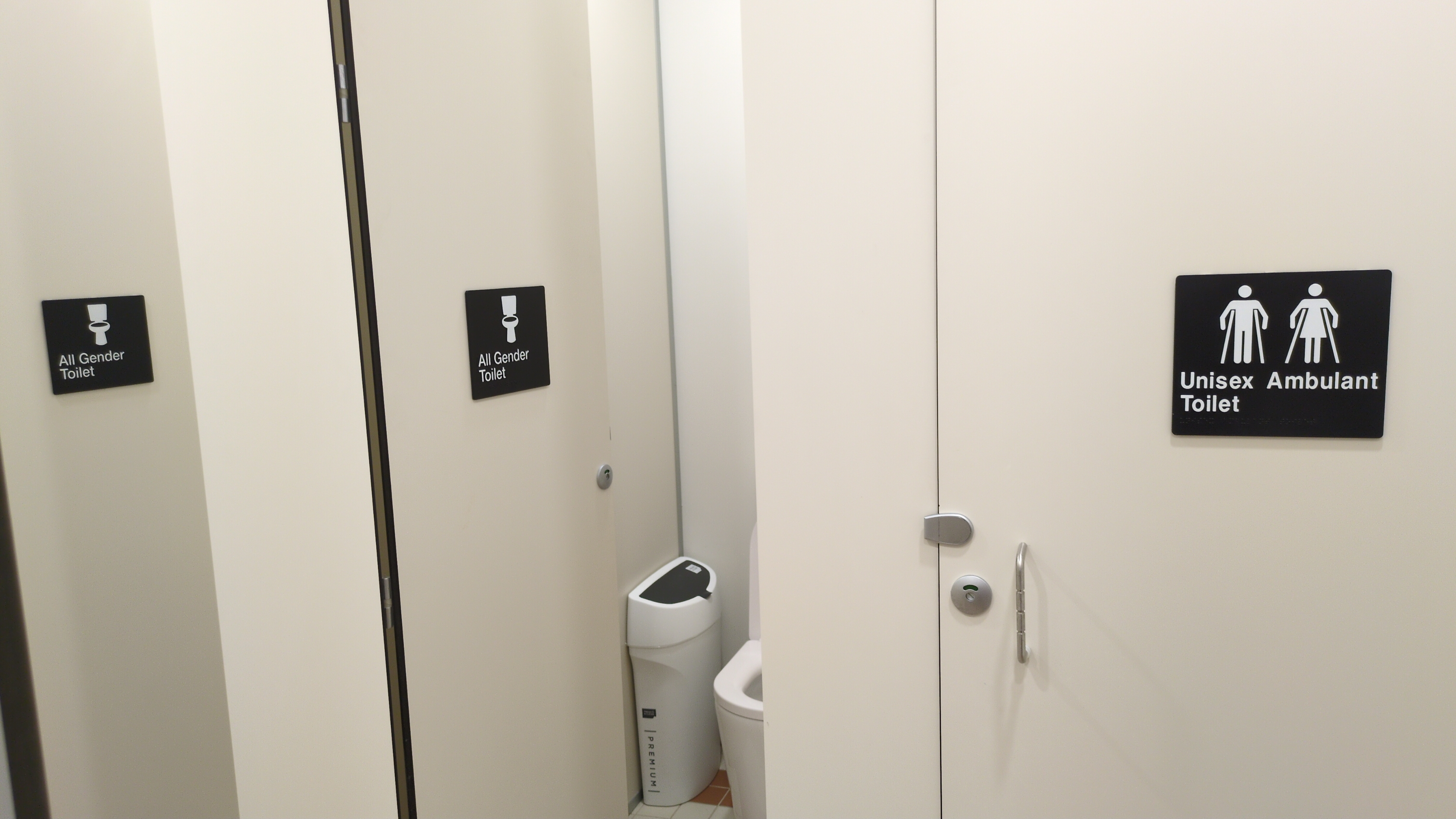
Unisex public toilet stalls in South Yarra, Victoria

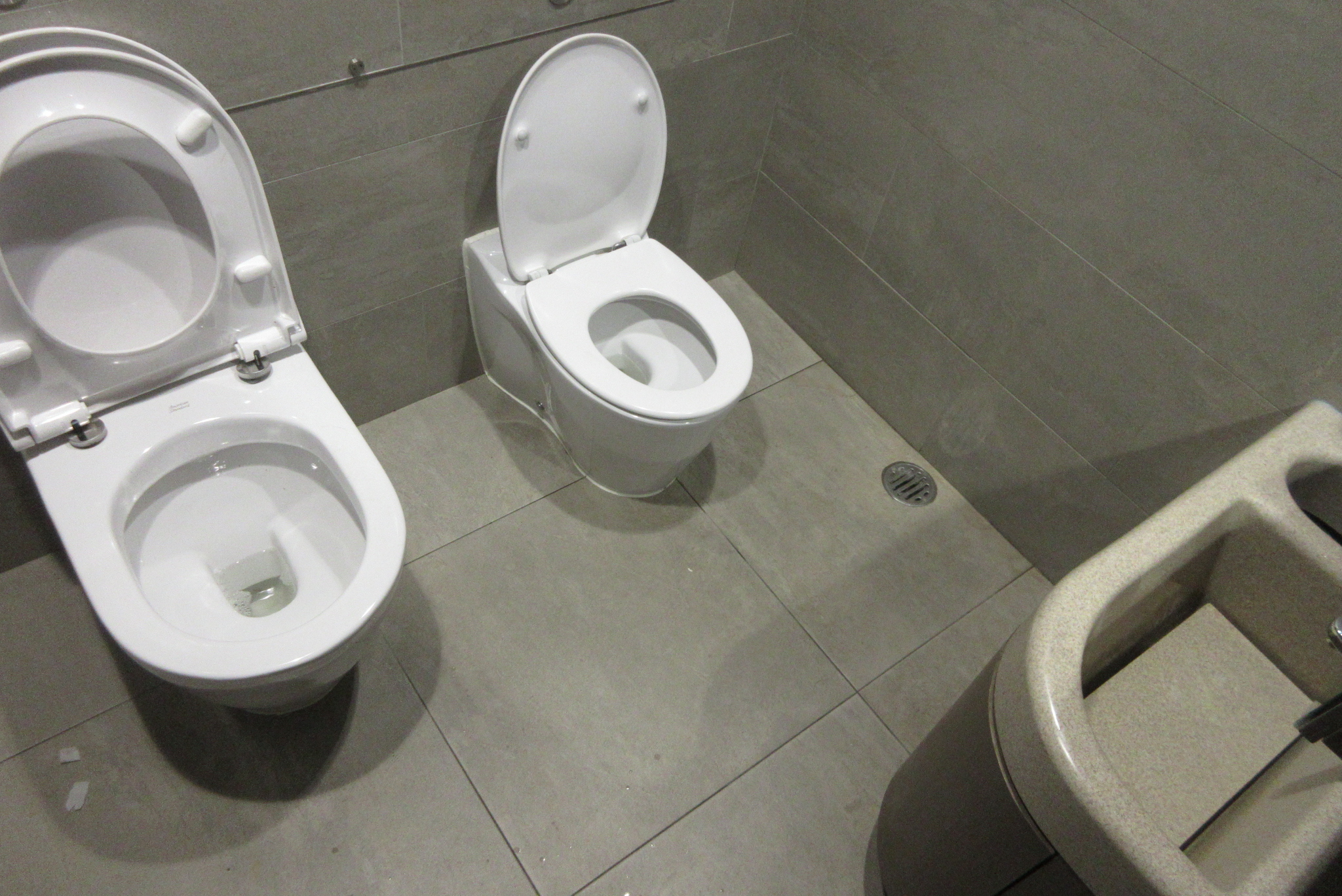
Family toilet interior at Hong Kong Tuen Mun Castle Peak Road, Hanford Garden Plaza. The smaller toilet is for small children.

=== Types ===
Some unisex public toilets, whether of single or of multiple capacity, are designed to be used by disabled people. They can accommodate not only physically disabled people, but also elderly people who may require assistance from a carer of another gender, and other cases where public sex-segregated facilities might lead to discomfort. Toilet facilities for disabled people, especially wheelchair users, may be either unisex or gender-specific.

Unisex public toilets are also common in cases where space is limited, such as in aircraft lavatories and passenger train toilets, or anywhere where a single toilet is made available.

Several types can be distinguished:

- Single-occupancy toilets, which provide only one room or enclosure. This room can also in certain circumstances be used by several people at once, e.g. a whole family, a person with their caretaker.
- Multi-user toilets, which are open to all and whose users may either share sinks in an open area or each have their own in their private cubicle, stall or room.
- Relabeled sex-segregated multi-cubicle public toilets, with no other change. This approach was taken in one area at the Barbican Centre in the UK, where some toilets became designated as shared by both sexes.

=== Toilets ===
If more than one toilet fixture is available in a unisex public toilet, the toilet seats or squatting pans are installed in enclosed cubicles in the same way as in sex-segregated toilets. To ensure visual privacy, these may be provided with floor-to-ceiling walls.

=== Sinks ===
Sinks are commonly installed in open arrangement as in sex-segregated toilets and used collectively by people of all genders. One of the key design components supporting safety in multi-user facilities is the openness and visibility of the sink area from adjacent public corridors. This design intervention allows for passive surveillance of the space by relocating the shared sink area from the private to the public realm. Alternatively, a sink can be provided in each cubicle or toilet room, e.g. where the unisex toilet is set up to be used by families and carers. The latter arrangement is more friendly to people needing to use the sink in a manner calling for a degree of privacy, or taking off items of dress typically worn in public. Examples are emergency removal of menstrual blood stains from clothing; refreshing the upper body, face, or underarms over the sink; applying makeup; or combing and styling hair.

=== Urinals ===
The issue of urinals is creating somewhat of a conundrum for many unisex public toilet designers. In many public toilets, the widespread use of urinals for males means that there are more opportunities to meet their natural needs. There are often queues in front of the toilet rooms for females but not in front of the toilet rooms for males. While toilets are usually located in cubicles with lockable doors, urinals are usually installed freely in rows in sex-separated toilet rooms, separated only by side partitions if present at all. This design uses less space and water and is more sanitary than standing to urinate in a stall without a sink, especially where others defecate.

Urinals have primarily been offered in public toilets for males, with female urinals being only a niche product. Abolishing all urinals would sacrifice resource advantages and convenience for male users without improving sanitation or wait time for females. Another possibility would be to offer separate male and female urinals or unisex urinals that can be used by males and females alike, which allows increased flexibility of use. Yet this would raise the problem of arrangement. One option would be to continue to offer urinals in rows, with separation by screens. However, it is questionable whether the less private environment, compared to cubicle toilets, would be met with acceptance. Socio-cultural conventions make the concept of men or boys urinating with their backs visible to women or girls potentially uncomfortable for both genders, and this would currently seem aberrant and contrary to common morals and etiquette for many users.

There are other practical issues for females, such as women and girls needing toilet paper, having to lower their pants, and sometimes tending to their menstrual hygiene needs while using toilets. Alternatives would be to accommodate urinals for both sexes in cubicles, limiting their space advantages, or to continue to offer them only in public toilets assigned for males.

Urinals arranged in cubicles have seldom been installed; the advantages over conventional toilets were not obvious because the same space would still be required in the new arrangement. With all things considered, many unisex public toilet designers are now creating plans to place urinals in an isolated section or corner of the toilet room so that they will not be directly visible to anyone in other areas of the public toilet, balancing efficiency with modesty.

=== Building-related advantages ===
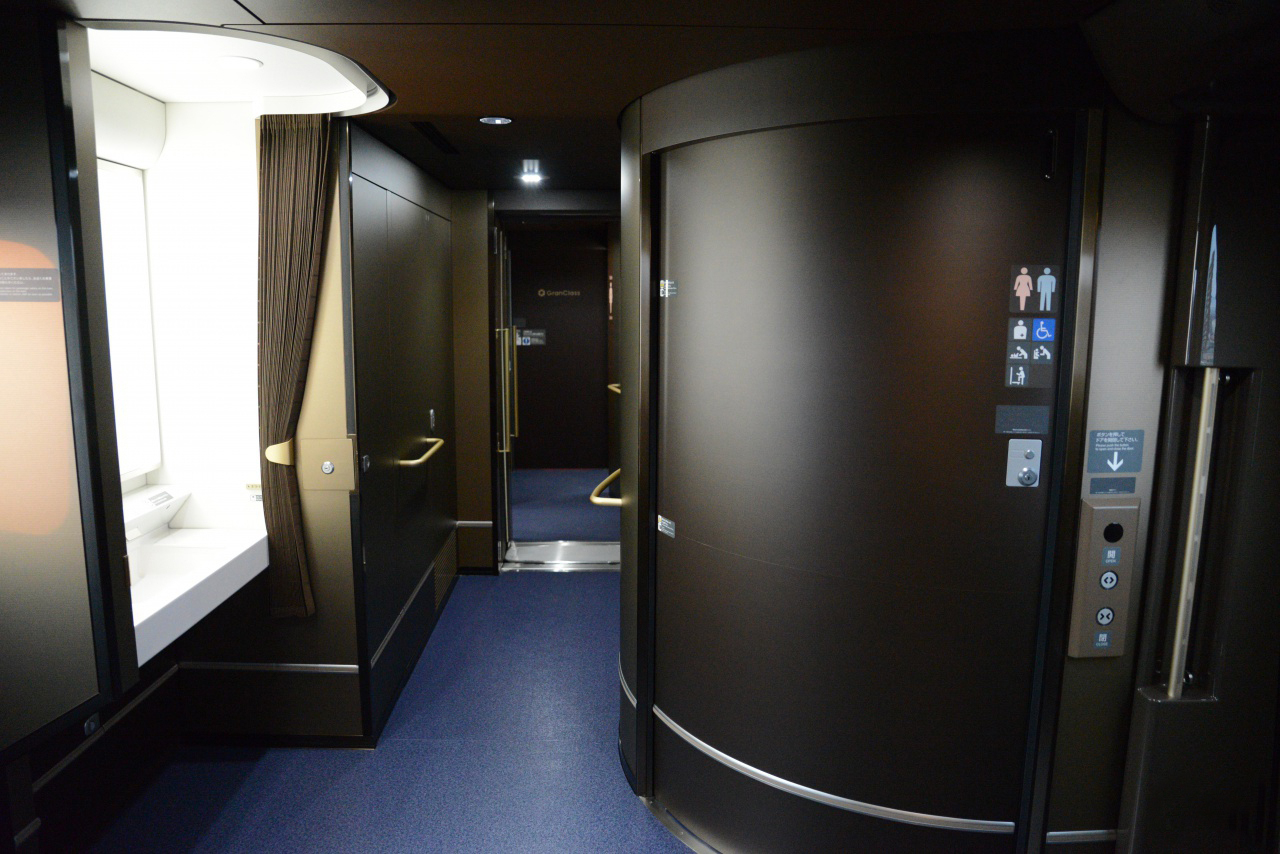
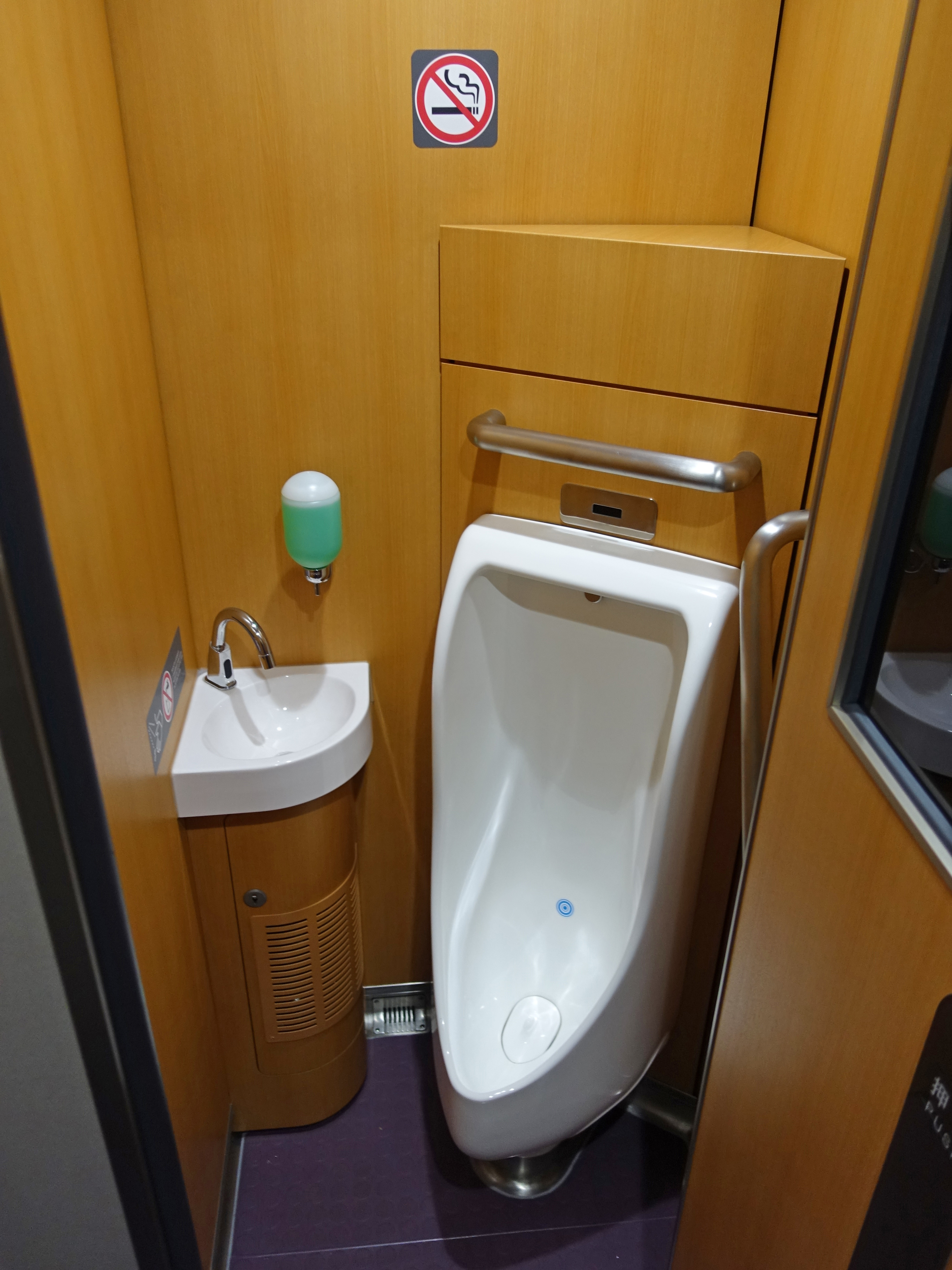
Unisex toilet with urinal in a Japanese Shinkansen express train

Where space is limited, sex-segregated sanitary facilities are not possible or must be limited. Unisex toilets are often used in many public transport systems, such as rail vehicles or airplanes, or by small businesses which provide a single toilet to their staff and customers.

Unisex public toilets cause fewer problems for caretakers of dependents who enter the toilet room together with their charge, such as a very young child, an elder, or a disabled person.

Women and girls often spend more time in toilet rooms than men or boys, for both physiological and cultural reasons. Urination takes longer inside a cubicle than at a urinal. Females also make more visits to toilets. Urinary tract infections and incontinence are more common in females. Pregnancy, menstruation, breastfeeding, and diaper-changing increase usage. The elderly, who are disproportionately female because of the higher male death rate, make longer and more frequent toilet visits. Unisex public toilets can alleviate this problem by providing equal sanitation space for all genders, eliminating the prospect of unused cubicles in the male toilets.

Some argue that a two-tier system is also generated by a "toilet apartheid" that excludes women and girls from important social networking processes in male toilets. Important agreements and decisions by males are sometimes made at the urinal, where females are currently excluded.

=== Building-related disadvantages ===
The consolidation of previously gender-separated toilets or the construction of new unisex toilets sometimes meets administrative and building-law resistance. The location of public toilets is sometimes dictated by existing plumbing design. If the only way to build unisex public toilets is to locate them in isolated spaces a long way from people in charge of supervising the space, such a design may be objectionable on safety grounds. Some argue that laws requiring that women and men be treated the same in public toilet access is unfair. Since the 1980s, "potty parity" activists have campaigned for laws requiring more female-designated public toilets than male-designated public toilets in public buildings, since women require more time to use the toilet and thus women's toilet rooms tend to have longer lines. California passed the first law of this kind in 1987, and as of 2009 twenty states in the US have passed similar legislation.

== Locations ==
AIGA standard restroom symbols

Men's

Women's

Unisex

=== At private companies ===
Unless prohibited by law (and when required by law), private companies can provide unisex toilets.

=== At educational institutions ===
Transgender students may face violence or harassment from their peers when using gendered facilities. Advocates argue that forcing trans and/or non-binary students to use normative gendered public toilets can stigmatize them daily by singling them out. Those who oppose unisex facilities in schools frequently cite safety and privacy concerns for cisgender students.

==== United States ====
Bathroom signs featuring simple images of toilets instead of traditional gendered iconography

Many colleges and universities (such as Oberlin College in Ohio) have had unisex public toilets as early as 2000. Overwhelmingly, institutions that offer unisex spaces still also offer sex-separated spaces. The University of California at Los Angeles offers more than 160 unisex toilets on campus, but all are single stall. Other collegiate institutions have moved toward creating some unisex public toilets. According to a University of Massachusetts Amherst LGBTQ advocacy organization, The Stonewall Centre, there were more than 150 campuses in the US in 2014 with unisex public toilets.

In February 2016, South Dakota was the first state in the US to pass a bill that forces transgender students in public schools to use sanitation facilities that correspond with their 'chromosomes and anatomy' at birth.

The University of Oklahoma continually adds unisex toilets to their campus to accommodate students who may require use of a less excessively gendered public toilet. As of February 2014, the university had 13 unisex toilets.

There are over 150 college campuses across the US that are creating unisex public toilets. In March 2016, New York City private college Cooper Union moved to remove gender designations from campus toilets. In October 2016, University of California Berkeley converted several public toilets into unisex toilets.

In March 2017, Yelp announced that they will add a unisex public toilet finder feature on their app. Yelp was one of over 50 companies that signed an amicus curiae brief in favor of a transgender high school student Gavin Grimm who claims that his school board denied him access to the boys' toilet in school and thereby violating Title IX. HRC president Chad Griffin stated on the brief that "These companies are sending a powerful message to transgender children and their families that America's leading businesses have their backs."

==== United Kingdom ====
In Scotland, the School Premises (General Requirements and Standards) (Scotland) Regulations 1967, require that separate single-sex toilets are provided for boys and girls, a position confirmed by a Court of Session Judge in 2025 in a ruling against Scottish Borders Council for having installed just gender-neutral toilets in a new school building.

Across the United Kingdom, unisex public toilets are sometimes found on university campuses. In early 2013, Brighton and Hove city council introduced unisex toilets. British universities including Bradford Union, Sussex and Manchester, had already or were in the process of building unisex facilities in 2011.

== Legislation and country examples ==
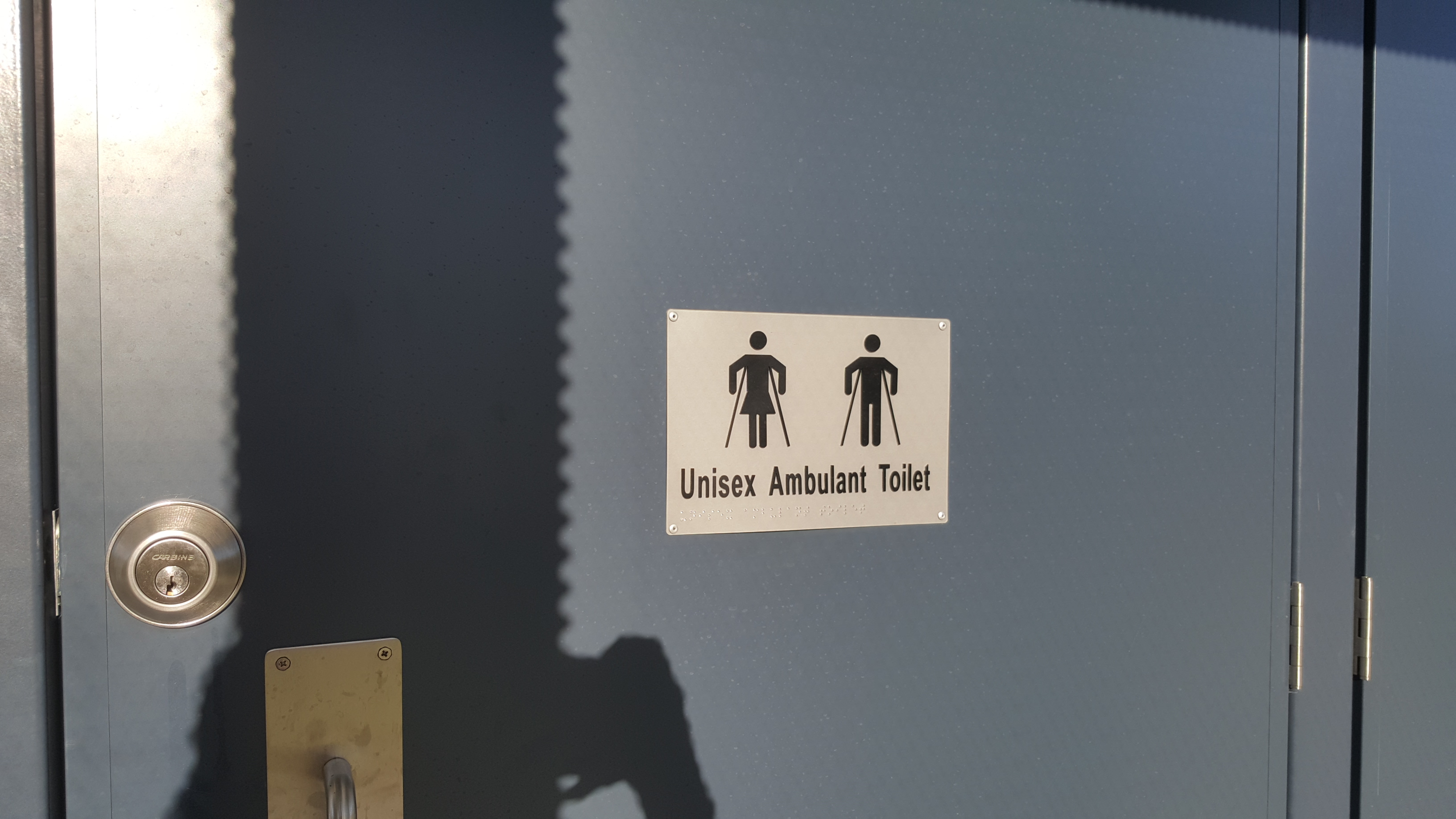
Toilet sign for "unisex ambulant toilet" (accessible toilet) at a park in Brisbane, Australia

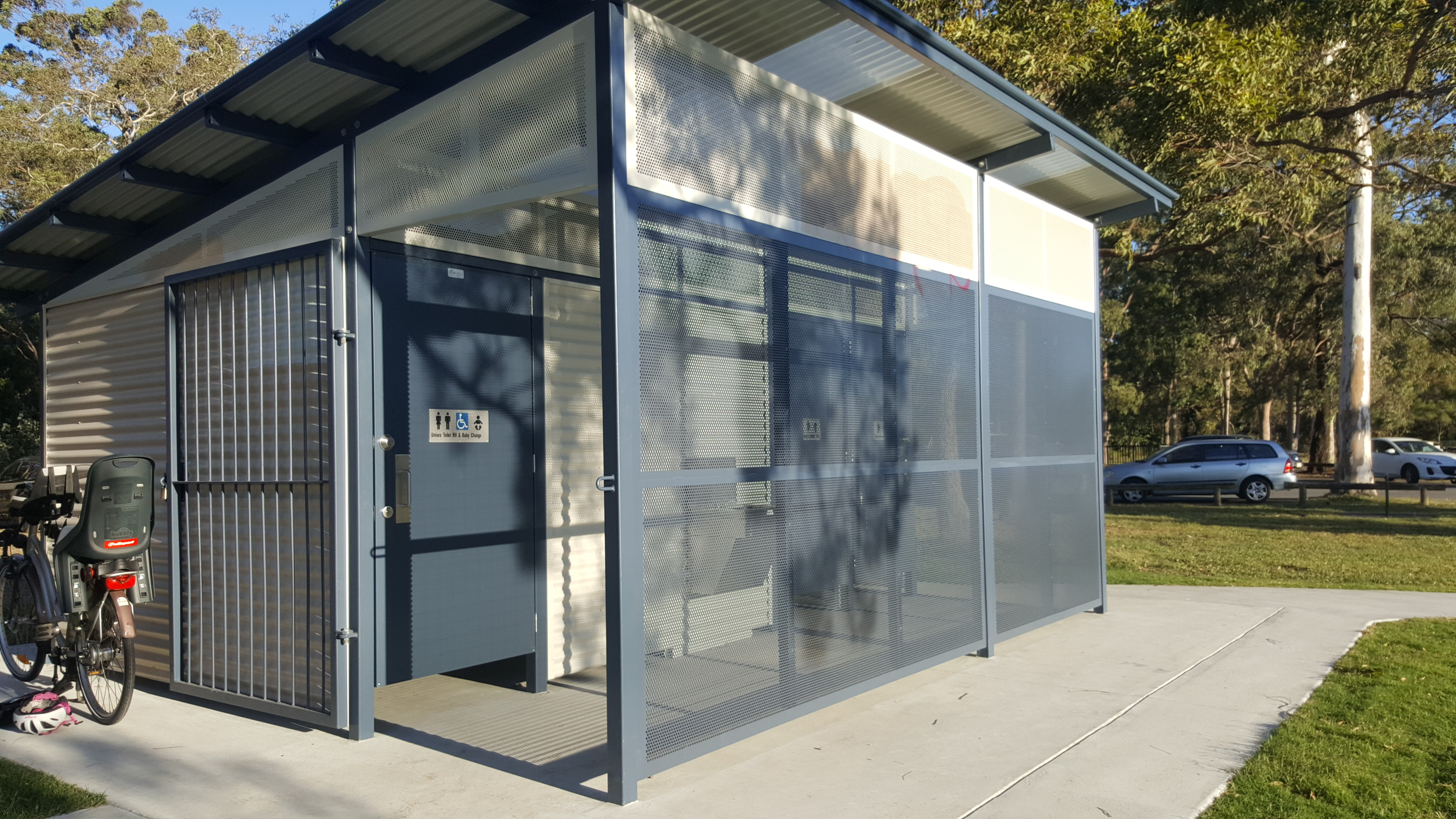
Toilet block at a park in Brisbane, Australia: the toilet block has two cubicles, both marked as unisex and accessible toilets, and a sink outside of the cubicles for handwashing.

=== Brazil ===
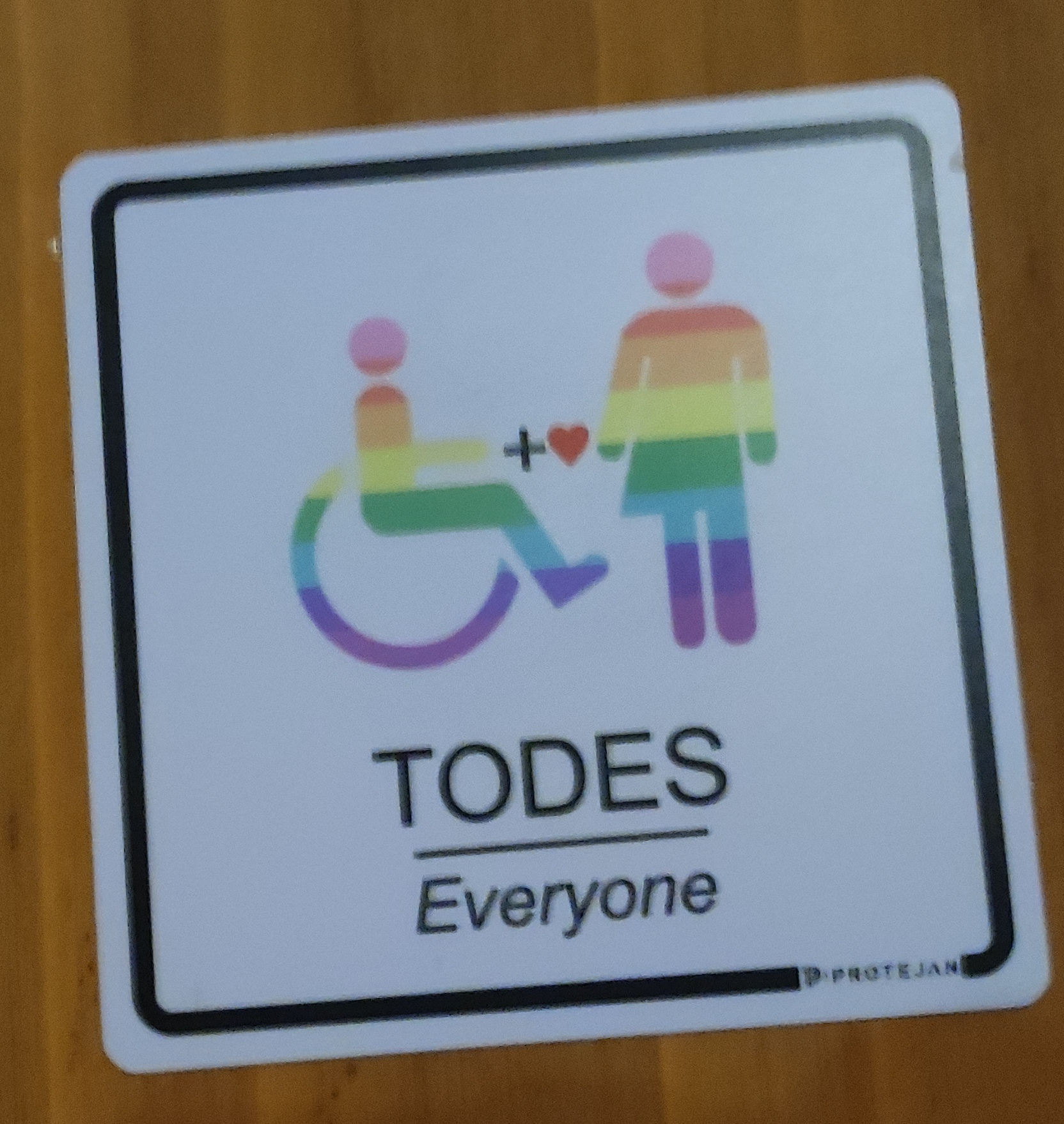
Rainbow-colored accessible toilet icon

The implementation of gender-neutral or unisex bathrooms, also called multigender toilets (Portuguese: banheiros multigênero), has sparked significant debate. Legislation varies across different states and municipalities. Some regions have introduced policies to promote the inclusion of gender-neutral bathrooms in public buildings and schools. For example, São Paulo has implemented measures to ensure that public schools provide gender-neutral bathroom options. These policies aim to protect the rights and dignity of transgender, travesti, and non-binary students, ensuring they have access to safe and inclusive facilities.

On January 26, 2026, the governor of Santa Catarina, Jorginho Mello, signed a law prohibiting schools from installing unisex bathrooms, establishing a fine of 10,000 reais for non-compliance.

=== Canada ===
In April 2014, the Vancouver Park Board decided to install unisex toilets in public buildings, with different signs to identify them. Amongst the options discussed was the rainbow triangle (based on the pink triangle used during the Holocaust), an "all-inclusive" gender symbol, an icon representing a toilet or the phrases "washroom" or "gender-neutral washroom" placed on the entrances to the toilets. According to Global News, a Canadian online newspaper, many different regions across Canada offer unisex toilets and other gender-neutral facilities, but Vancouver was the first municipality to change building codes to require unisex toilets be built in public buildings. This movement, according to commissioner Trevor Loke, was aimed to make everyone feel welcomed and included: "We think that the recommendation of universal washrooms is a good idea [...] [w]e will be using more inclusive language based on the BC Human Rights Code." Some initiatives to make public toilets more diverse and inclusive have focused on language simply by using the phrases "toilet" or "gender-neutral toilet" in order to be inclusive of all genders and gender identities, or using specifically geared language such as "women and trans women" as opposed to just "women" (and vice versa for men and trans men).

=== China ===
Unisex toilets have appeared in China since before 2013 in Shenyang and Chengdu by 2015. In 2016, Shanghai opened its first public unisex toilet near the Zhangjiabin River in a park, in the Pudong district. Many of these toilets have opened in high-traffic areas for the convenience of all users, rather than specifically for the benefit of sexual minorities. In May 2016, a Beijing-based non-governmental organization launched an 'All Gender Toilets' campaign to bring awareness to this issue in China. This resulted in around 30 locations opening unisex public toilets.

=== India ===
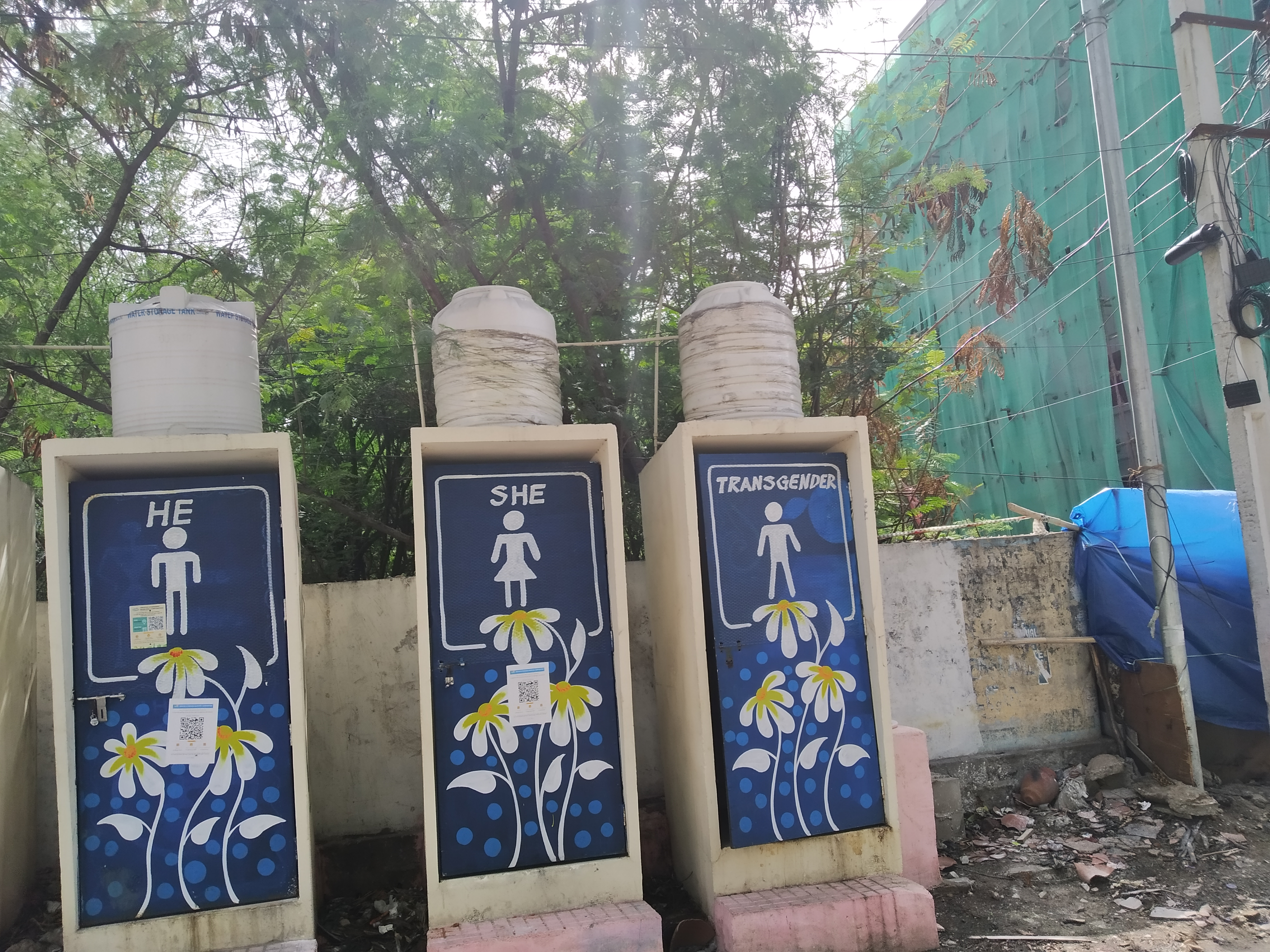
Male, female and hijra toilets in India

In 2014, the Indian Supreme Court gave transgender people, also known as 'hijras', recognition with a third gender. This legislation included creating separate toilets for transgender people in public spaces where transgender people are often met with violence and hostility. The two-judge Supreme Court bench was led by Justice KS Radhakrishnan, who said, "The court order gives legal sanctity to the third gender. The judges said the government must make sure that they have access to medical care and other facilities like separate wards in hospitals and separate toilets". In 2017, the Union Ministry of Drinking Water and Sanitation sent out guidelines to the Swachh Bharat Mission decreeing that members who are part of the transgender community should be allowed to use the public toilet they are most comfortable with.

The central government has allowed transgender people to use the toilets of their choice in public and community toilets. This does not ensure safety from violence.

=== Japan ===
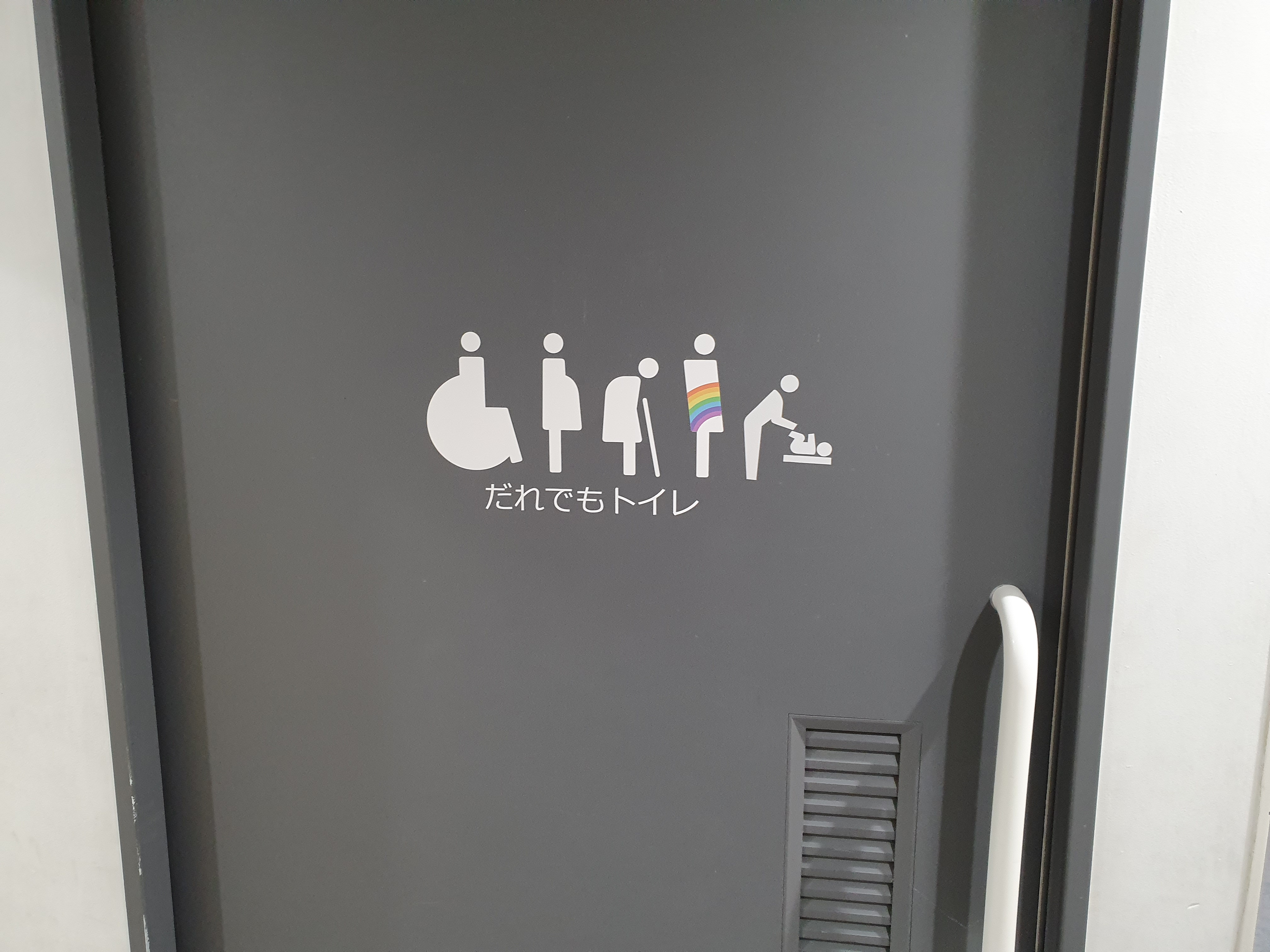
"Toilets for anyone" in Japan

As of 2016, no laws were in place regarding the usage of public toilets in relation to gender identity. There may, however, be occasional signs outside public toilets to indicate that the stall is "gender free". The Tokyo city government was planning to install one unisex toilet in at least seven out of eleven of the buildings being used for the Olympic Games that were planned for 2020.

=== Nepal ===
MP Sunil Babu Pant used part of the Parliamentarian Development Fund to build the first two unisex toilets in Nepalganj, one of which is in Bageshwori Park. Starting in 2014, The Nepal Country Report, A Participatory Review and Analysis of the Legal and Social Environment for Lesbian, Gay, Bisexual and Transgender (LGBT) Persons and Civil Society recommended that in schools separate toilets or unisex toilets should be built for transgender students.

=== Thailand ===
The term "kathoeys" used to describe effeminate male-bodied people, for whom schools have started opening sex-separated toilets for since 2003. After legislation passed, in 2004 a private vocational college in Chiang Mai Thailand gave 15 'kathoey' students the opportunity to use toilet facilities that were solely for them, referred to as 'pink lotus' public toilets. Alliance organizations in Thailand such as the Thai Transgender Alliance and the Transferral Association of Thailand were created to support kathoey people such as by helping create separate public toilet facilities.

=== United States ===
There are unisex toilets in some public spaces in the United States. Cooper Union of New York City, New York was the first college in the country to de-gender all of their campus bathrooms in 2015.

Despite this, transgender and gender nonconforming people are still sometimes subject to visual or verbal scrutiny; this is reinforced by the architectural design and heteronormative gendered codes of conduct that are still present within the US.

On the federal level, the US Department of Labor is in charge of workplace toilets, which means setting state guidelines through the Occupational Safety and Health Administration (OSHA). OSHA recommends that any workplace single-user toilet be made all-gender. For non-work related public toilet guidelines, the Department of Health and Human Services governs regulations. The Equal Employment Opportunity Commission ("EEOC") has also played a role in interpreting federal statutes and enforcing them. Two statutes relevant to public toilets are Title VII (nondiscrimination in the workplace) and Title IX (nondiscrimination in educational opportunity based on sex).

Building codes may be adopted by statute or regulation. They may require sex-separation or they may require unisex toilets. New building codes usually do not apply retroactively. Thus, building owners may choose not to update existing features because it allows them to continue following the older building codes that govern those older features. These regulations are mostly based on the precedent created by original legislation. They sometimes also work to eliminate the longer wait time females often face by creating a ratio of more female toilets than male toilets, and provide more inclusive environments for people requiring assistance in the restroom or people with children of a different gender. Various private businesses such as Target have publicly committed to maintaining all gender restrooms in stores nationwide even when not mandated by local or state ordinances.

==== US local ordinances ====
All-gender single-user restroom mandates in the United States: Mandated by the 2021 IPC Mandated by other law No mandate

In most jurisdictions, local governments have the ability to pass ordinances, so long as they do not conflict with state law. San Francisco (California), Philadelphia (Pennsylvania), Seattle (Washington), Washington (District of Columbia), Berkeley (California), Cathedral City (California), West Hollywood (California), Austin (Texas), Cleveland (Ohio), New York City, Denver (Colorado), and the US states of Vermont, New Mexico, New York State, Illinois, Rhode Island, Maine, and California - have passed measures mandating that single-occupancy toilets in public spaces be labeled as unisex (or gender-neutral). In 2022, California enacted legislation allowing cities to build multi-stall gender-neutral bathrooms. Additionally, the 2021 edition of the International Plumbing Code (in use by 35 states, Puerto Rico, Guam, and DC) will require the same as individual states adopt the new edition of the code.

Some examples for local or state ordinances regarding unisex public toilets (see also: bathroom bill):

- The city council of Portland, Oregon passed an ordinance for "all-user restrooms" in 2015 which directed city bureaus to convert "single-user gender-specific restrooms" into "all-user restrooms" within six months.
- On May 11, 2018, Vermont Governor Phil Scott signed a bill requiring all single-user public toilets to be unisex, effective July 1, 2018.
- On September 29, 2022, California became the first state to allow cities to require multi-stall unisex restrooms in buildings which are either newly constructed or undergoing extensive renovation. This law was supported by the City Council of West Hollywood, California, which passed an ordinance to that effect on December 7, 2022.

The Human Rights Campaign, an LGBTQ advocacy group, recommends that employers grant access, and use, to public toilets according to an employee's "full time gender presentation", and provides a list of recommendations on achieving this.

=== Portugal ===
In Portugal, some schools are adopting gender-neutral bathrooms and changing rooms as part of inclusive initiatives. The "Escola às Cores" project was implemented at Escola Básica Frei João in Vila do Conde, introducing individual bathrooms and changing rooms without gender identification. This change aimed to create a safe environment for trans students and also benefited those with other needs, such as health issues or home conditions that hindered proper hygiene. The initiative was successful and did not generate problems, emphasizing the importance of inclusive measures.

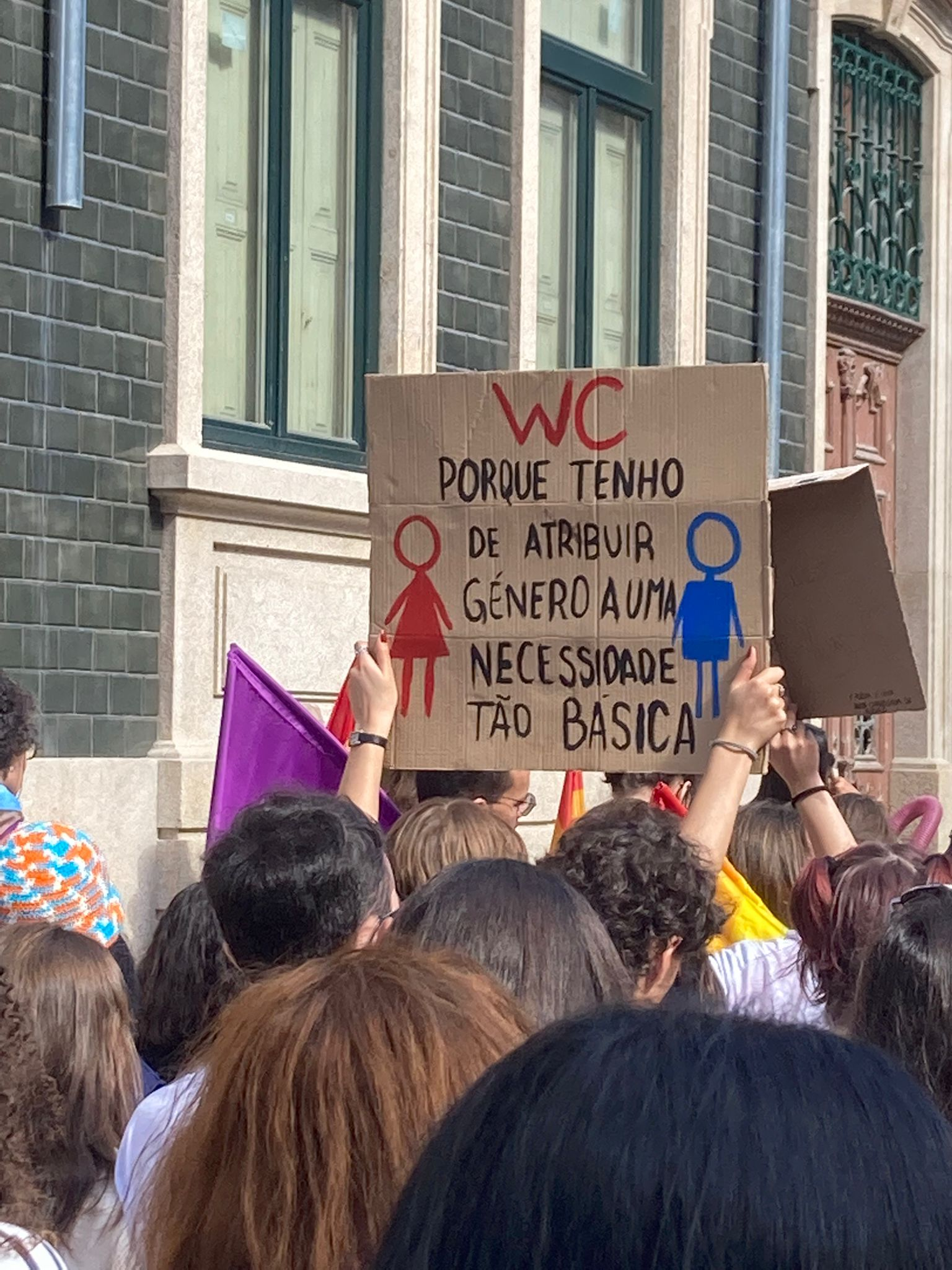
In a card, it reads in Portuguese: "Why do I have to assign a gender to such a basic need?". Gender-neutral bathrooms have been a matter of discussion in Portugal.

Other schools, like a private school in Lisbon and Escola António Arroio in Lisbon, have also adopted similar practices, promoting inclusive and respectful environments. However, not all stories are positive, with reports of challenges faced by some trans students in different school contexts.

The legislation passed in December 2023 emphasized the need to ensure the well-being of all students in accessing bathrooms and changing rooms, encouraging necessary adaptations. The law did not abolish gender-segregated bathrooms, but there was misinformation that caused social panic. The legislation focused on respecting gender identity and allowing individuals to use self-attributed names in schools, without mandating mixed bathrooms. Despite this, the misunderstanding led to unnecessary concerns and fear within society. Psychologist Ana Silva warned of cases where children avoid using gendered restroom facilities due to fear of insults or aggression.

The Conselho de Ética e Ciências da Vida supports the existence of neutral bathrooms in schools, emphasizing the importance of respecting the right to privacy and intimacy.

== History of sex-separated toilets ==
There are competing theories regarding how and why public toilets (or "bathrooms" in the United States) first became separated by sex in the United States and Europe.

=== Western sex-separation as a modern development ===
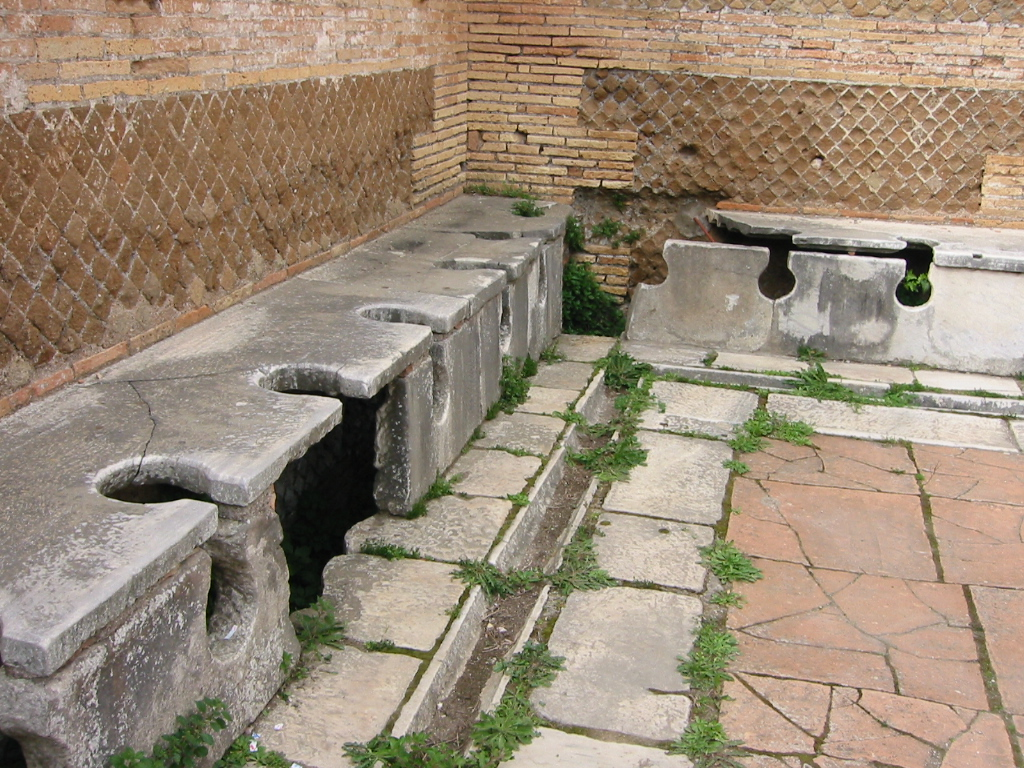
Roman public latrine, Ostia Antica

Public toilets, part of the sanitation system of ancient Rome, were shared by many demographics. These latrines housed long benches with holes accommodating multiple simultaneous users. There was no privacy between users, as using the facilities was considered a social activity. This communal multi-seater typology continued until the 1800s.

By the Middle Ages, public toilets became uncommon. People had the legal right and social custom to urinate and defecate wherever they pleased.

Sociologist Dara Blumenthal notes changing bodily habits, attitudes, and practices regarding hygiene starting in the 16th century, which eventually led to a resurgence of public toilets in the 19th century. Civility increasingly required the removal of waste product from contact with others. New instruction manuals, schoolbooks, and court regulations dictated what was appropriate. Some scholars argue that with increasingly strict prohibitions on bodily display and the emergence of a rigid ideology of gender, visual privacy and spatial separation of the sexes were introduced into public toilet design. They say that it was not until the Victorian era, starting in Great Britain, that sex separation began in public toilets.

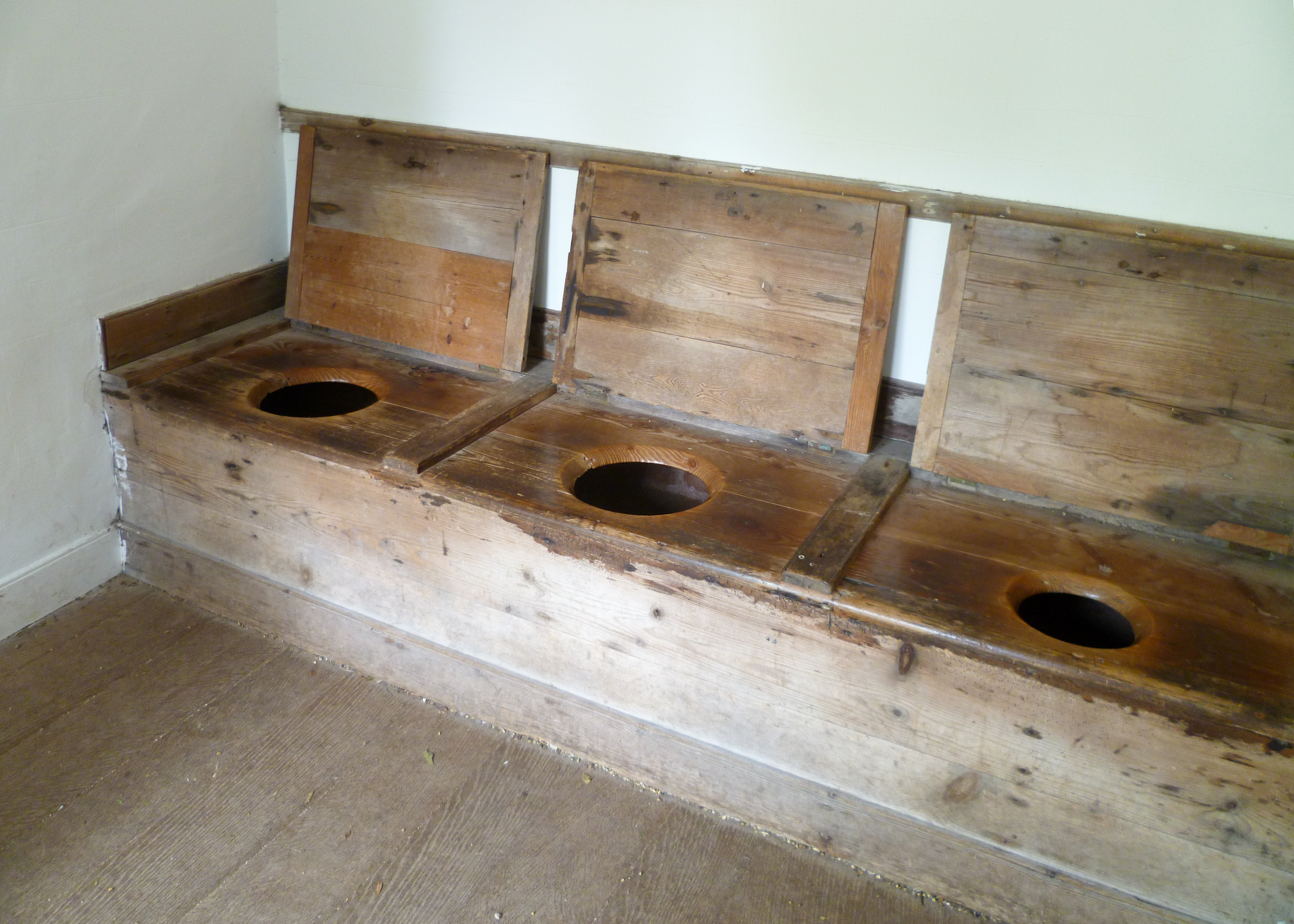
Early 18th century British three-seat privy

The earliest known example of a western sex-separated public toilet was a temporary installation that occurred in 1739 at a Parisian ball. This involved chamber boxes in separate rooms with attendants guiding visitors to the appropriate location. According to sociologist and author Sheila Cavanagh, this was seen by the guests as "sort of a novelty – something eccentric and fun." She argues that this was done to accentuate sexual difference, and project that difference onto public space.

George Jennings, the sanitary engineer, introduced public toilets, which he called "monkey closets", to the Crystal Palace for The Great Exhibition of 1851. They included separate amenities for men and women, and were the first flush toilet facilities to introduce sex-separation to the activity. London's first public toilet facility opened the next year with only provisions for men, although other facilities opened for women at other venues.

Some scholars say the practice of maintaining separate toilets coincides with early 19th century moral ideology regarding the appropriate role and place for women in society. According to historian Terry Kogan, this constructed women as "inherently vulnerable and in need of protection" and men as "inherently predatory." This sexist view was put forward as a supposedly scientific fact, to curb the emergent women's rights movement. Legislators and policymakers acted on protecting "weaker" women by limiting their work hours, requiring rest periods during the day, and prohibiting certain jobs. This also included architectural solutions to "protect" women such as separate toilet facilities with "fainting" couches.

In the United States, Massachusetts was the first state to pass a law mandating sex-separated toilet facilities in 1887. It was titled "An Act To Secure Proper Sanitary Provisions in Factories and Workshops". The act called for suitable and separate toilets for women in the workplace. By 1920, this was mandated in 43 states. This development is believed to be a reflection of women entering the workforce.

Under another view, offered by W. Burlette Carter, sex-separation has long been the standard in the U.S. and Great Britain and most of the world where women's well-being was valued. She argues that when people used chamber pots, sex-separation could be achieved by placing the pot in a separated space. In single-use privies and similar spaces, that separation was achieved by allowing only one "sex" to use the space at a time. In multi-use spaces, it was achieved either through the same means or by separate spaces for the sexes. Very likely, the primary reasons for establishing these sex-separated spaces were safety and privacy for women and children. Concerns over undesired pregnancy and procreation were additional considerations. Some of these were related to concerns about rape or about moral views about how and when women should become pregnant (e.g., objections to premarital sex). Evidence also suggest that, in earlier centuries, when people sought to create unisex spaces for those who wanted or needed them, authorities resisted.

Carter argues that toilet separation by sex preceded 1739, and that in fact sex separated toilets have been a feature in multi-use spaces since their beginnings. Prior to the 1887 Massachusetts statute, across the United States and Europe at least, sex-separation was the norm already. For example, Massachusetts had statewide regulations that required sex-separation in particular venues such as schools before 1887. The earliest written reference to sex-separation in the United States may be from 1786. A traveler described bathers using a public spring called Healing Springs, in South Carolina. The bathers would hang Aprons from a tree to mark when the women were bathing and used Hats to mark when the men were bathing. Within the culture of that time, this practice was tantamount to hanging "women" and "men" signs. Furthermore, ancient evidence, including art-work, confirms widespread use of sex-separation (or sex segregation), especially in multi-use spaces - therefore not limiting the concept to public toilets. The exceptions were where the spaces were intended for amorous purposes by opposite sex couples, where safety was considered not to be at risk, or where women were not valued by society.

=== Primary rationales of sex-separation ===
One theory argues there were four primary rationales for sex-segregated toilets as detailed by state statutes and related literature in the nineteenth century: sanitation, women's privacy, the protection of women's bodies, which were seen as weaker, and to protect social morality especially as it pertained to the nineteenth century ideology of separate spheres. Subsequently, other states in the US created similar laws, often by amending existing protective labor legislation. Forty-three states had passed similar legislation by 1920. Others argue that safety and privacy were the two main goals of sex-separation (although factors such as morality also played roles). In New York in 1886, for example, factory inspectors asked for separate toilets out of concerns of women who came to them complaining of sexual harassment. Others argued for complete space separation citing the pressure on women to engage in sexual behavior to keep their jobs. Authorities who cared about these issues were trying to respond to those concerns by mandating separation. Indeed, these laws were likely among the first anti-sexual harassment laws in the nation. Many victims in the workplace were afraid to press charges for fear of losing work.

Some scholars have tied toilet sex-separation to segregation based on race discrimination in the US. Advocates of this view argue that these approaches share a theme in which a warning is issued against the looming threats: violence and sexual assaults would increase. Some political activists have drawn on the commonality between public toilets being segregated formerly by race and still by sex. Others argue that while all discrimination has commonalities, this parallel does not account for historical sex separation within racial groups, such as the forced separation of African men and women on slave ships.

In prior cases where restrooms were separated by race as well as gender, white women have traditionally been given more amenities because they were white. This denial was a sign of discrimination against others based on race and/or poverty, and not automatically a sign of society assigning a lesser value to women in general. Men also experienced different treatment, not based on class, but based on race, with black men having less favorable facilities. There is historical evidence that authorities have enforced the norm of sex-separated facilities to resist attempts by sexual minorities to create safe spaces that reimagined sex and gender lines.

== Criticism ==
Some opponents of multi-user unisex public toilets argue that eliminating sex-separation entirely or identifying unisex spaces as the norm is not inclusive to women. They believe that women and children are more likely to be harassed and sexually assaulted there compared to sex-segregated public toilets. Safety in public toilets is still a serious issue for women. The recording of women in private spaces without their consent is also an issue.

Supporters of retaining the single-sex designation for communal toilets point to the specific needs of women, such as menstrual hygiene. They argue that these require sex-segregation in public toilets for reasons of personal comfort and privacy, especially among adolescent girls. Other concerns include that multi-user unisex toilets may be avoided by women, leading to both discomfort to women and wasting funds. Furthermore, while the use of urinals remains an efficient option for nearly half of the total population, their presence is often considered impractial outside of toilet rooms specifically for males. Supporters of sex-segregated toilets argue that both males and females may feel "awkward" having to share a toilet room with the opposite sex.

Gender-critical groups like Woman's Place UK have argued against unisex toilets on the basis that sexual harassment would increase. They assert that they affirm the existence of transgender people and their right to protection but that women's rights, as they see them, must also be recognized. In this respect, debate has centred around UK proposals to amend the Gender Recognition Act to change the process of obtaining a Gender Recognition Certificate to one of self-identification. Supporters of unisex spaces and access by self-declaration have rejected these claims.

Some religious groups have opposed unisex public toilets on the basis of morality. In 2017, a conservative Christian faith group leader in Texas has compared the introduction of unisex toilets with the abolition of Bible reading in state schools. However, there is energy for and against new bathroom bills by various groups of Christians.

In Germany, a member of the German right-wing party Alternative für Deutschland (AfD) regards the unisex toilet as a danger for German women and relates it to sexual assaults by "criminal foreigners".

=== Protests and opposition ===
Backlash has sometimes occurred when unisex public toilets have been implemented without wide public embrace. After backlash, and complaints from women, the Barbican Centre in the UK was required to reconsider its original design. They later issued a statement promising that, in addition to unisex public toilets, they would keep sex-separated toilets as well. In Los Angeles in 2016, there were violent clashes between supporters and opponents of toilets. Students, who attended the school with unisex toilets, confronted the adult protestors who had been outside the school with signs and horns. In Germany in 2018, the newly installed unisex toilets at Bielefeld University were repeatedly vandalized. In Toronto, also in 2018, people complained about a unisex washrooms in a mall. In May 2021, The Daily Telegraph reported that Robert Jenrick, the communities secretary, was planning to ban unisex toilets in public buildings in order to "maintain safeguards that protect women".

== Society and culture ==
=== Developing countries ===
In both developed and developing countries, many of the organizations active in water, sanitation and hygiene (WASH) provision have asserted that separate toilets for boys and girls at school are very important to make girls feel comfortable and safe using the sanitation facilities at schools. For example, in 2018, UNESCO stated that single-sex toilets are needed to overcome girls' barriers to education. This concern could potentially apply to boys as well, especially when open urinals are maintained. As an alternative, some argue that unisex school toilets could be provided at schools in addition to facilities that are separated by gender (which is often the case already in the case of toilets for people with disabilities).

WaterAid is researching options of appropriate unisex public toilets in developing countries. In 2017, they stated that those kinds of gender-neutral/mixed-sex toilets, where people can access all toilets irrespective of their gender, is not recommended in contexts where it may increase the risk of violence against women or transgender people, or where it is deemed culturally inappropriate.

Some activists favor 'third gender' public toilets which would only be used by transgender people. The degree of agreement or disagreement on such issues is difficult to gauge. However, this is still being debated. Some advocates argue that it would reinforce stigma and result in people being banned from accessing the toilets of the gender they identify with. It has been argued that in some African countries where transgender people are being prosecuted, this option would likely bring no benefit at all to them.

In the case of India, it has been found that designing transgender-inclusive sanitation is more than just a technical issue: It requires a deeper examination of the role of caste, gender, and age within the transgender community. Using a toilet that explicitly broadcasts a transgender person's identity to others may not be desirable to all transgender persons.

=== Transgender and gender nonconforming people ===
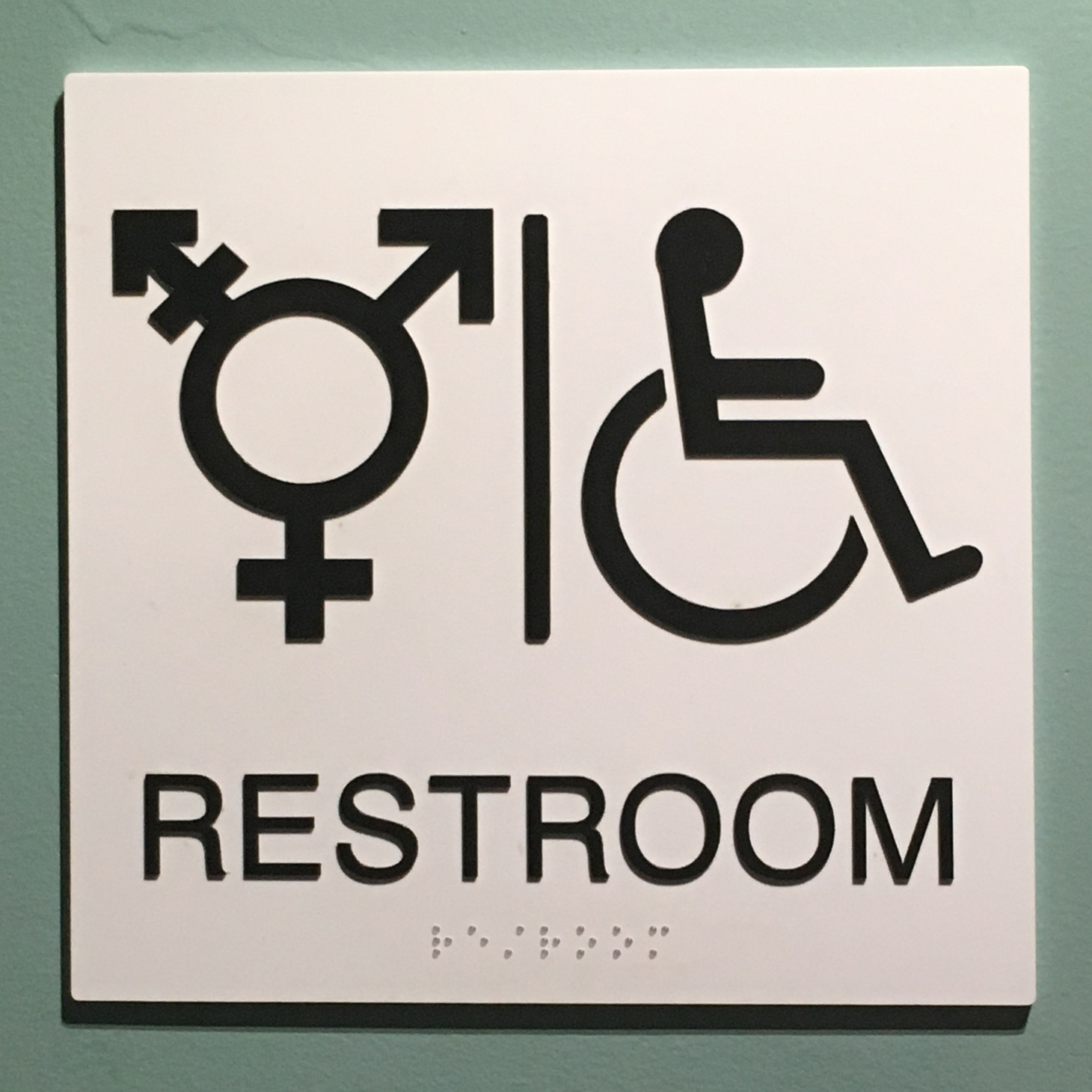
Some toilets use a combined gender symbol to indicate a unisex, gender-neutral or transgender-friendly public toilet

Advocates argue that public toilets and sanitation facilities have historically not met the needs of the LGBTI communities. They maintain that this is an issue with respect to the human right to water and sanitation and also from the perspective of the Sustainable Development Goal 6, which aim for universal access to sanitation and their vision of gender equality. All-gender public toilets are intended to ensure that toilets are fully accessible to all members of society.

Transgender and gender non-conforming persons are at a high risk of violence without access to gender-neutral bathrooms (see: trans bashing). They are often be subject to embarrassment, harassment, even assault or arrest, by others offended by the presence of a person they interpret as being of a different sex than themselves. It has been argued that walking into a toilet separated by sex requires people to self-separate and that some transgender people report being challenged on what public toilet they choose to use and subsequently "do their best to forego use of public toilets altogether". Providing unisex toilets can eliminate discrimination and harassment for people who may be perceived to be in the "wrong" toilet.

A 2015 study by the National Center for Transgender Equality found that 59% of transgender American avoided using public facilities for fear of confrontation. This landmark study, which included 27,715 respondents, found that 24% of respondents had their presence in the restroom questioned, 12% had experienced verbal harassment, physical assault, or sexual assault when attempting to use the restroom, and 9% were denied access entirely. Several studies have found that preventing transgender people from using public toilets has negative mental health impacts, leading to a higher risk of suicide. Without gender-neutral facilities, many people are unable to fulfill a basic need.

Hate crimes have taken place following transgender people using a bathroom. Alexa Negrón Luciano of Puerto Rico was shot and killed just hours after being reported to police for using a women's bathroom. Hate speech and gun shots can be heard in a video of the killing, causing investigators to treat this incident as motivated by transphobia. There have been a number of incidents covered by the news of transgender people being denied access, being forced to leave after appearing to have used the "wrong" bathroom, being made to use a bathroom that does not align with their identity, being harassed, being beaten, and being arrested.

In the early twenty-first century, with increased coverage of the transgender community, there have been some initiatives calling for unisex public toilets, instead of only male and female ones, to better accommodate genderqueer individuals. Sex-separation of public toilets began gaining traction as a controversial issue in US politics in 2010. This has become an increasingly contentious issue, as shown in the battles over North Carolina's 2016 Public Facilities Privacy & Security Act, among other bathroom bills. Several groups and organizations, whether in person or online, exist in order to combat attitudes and bills that oppose transgender individuals. For instance, the Transgender Law Center's "Peeing in Peace" is a pamphlet that serves as a resource guide full of information on harassment, safe public toilet campaigns and legal information.

While transgender public toilet usage has been labelled by many as a moral panic, the ongoing discourse continues to have significant impacts on this group.

== See also ==
- Bathroom bill - legislation about public toilets in the United States
- Female urination device
- Gender apartheid
- Human right to water and sanitation
- Potty parity
- Sanitation
- Unisex changing rooms
