= Andy Pearson =

British mixologist

Andy Pearson is a mixologist and director of drinks consultancy Intoxicology. The Telegraph declared him "the UK's top bartender".

In 2007 Pearson won the United Kingdom Bartenders Guild National Cocktail Competition with his cocktail Spirit of '57; he went on to represent the UK in the IBA World Cocktail Competition, finishing in the top five.

Pearson is one of the resident drinks experts for the BBC2 television show Something for the Weekend, on which he makes regular appearances.

In 2008 Pearson appeared at number 25 in Theme Magazine's list of the top 100 movers and shakers in the bar industry.
