= Rebecca Seal =

British magazine editor and freelance journalist

Rebecca Seal is a British former assistant editor of Observer Food Monthly and Observer Woman and is now a magazine editor and freelance journalist.

== Education ==
Rebecca has a MA in International Peace and Security from King's College London and an BSc in International Relations from the London School of Economics.

== Career ==
Specialising in food, drink and lifestyle pieces, Rebecca has written articles for many magazines and newspapers including Grazia, Red and Olive, The Guardian, The Financial Times, Sunday Telegraph, The Observer, The Times and Sunday Times. Food/drink expert on C4's Sunday Brunch.

== Personal life ==
Rebecca's wedding was at the Asylum Chapel in Peckham, and the reception at the East Dulwich Tavern. Rebecca and husband Steve Joyce have two kids, Isla and Coralie.

== Bibliography ==
- Be Bad, Better: How not trying so hard will set you free - 25 Jan 2024
- Leon Big Salads - 13 April 2023
- Leon Happy One-pot Vegetarian - 3 Mar 2022
- Leon Happy Guts - 24 Jun 2021
- Solo: How to Work Alone (and Not Lose Your Mind) - 23 Feb 2021
- Leon Happy Curries - 3 Oct 2019
- Leon Fast Vegan - 27 Dec 2018
- Leon Happy One-pot Cooking - 4 Oct 2018
- Leon Happy Soups - 5 Oct 2017
- Lisbon: Recipes from the Heart of Portugal - 15 Jun 2017
- Postcards from Greece - 19 May 2016
- The Greenwich Market Cookbook - 22 Mar 2016
- Istanbul: Recipes from the heart of Turkey - 8 Jul 2013

== Business ==
Co-Founder of Kemble House Photography Studio
