= Win It, Cook It =

- Genre: Cookery Game show
- Presented by: Simon Rimmer
- Country of origin: United Kingdom
- Original language: English
- No. of series: 1
- No. of episodes: 30

Production
- Running time: 30 minutes (inc. adverts)
- Production company: Plum Pictures

Original release
- Network: Channel 4
- Release: 4 August – 19 September 2014

Win It, Cook It is a British cookery game show that aired on Channel 4 from 4 August to 19 September 2014 and is hosted by Simon Rimmer.
