= Something for the Weekend (TV programme) =

British television programme

- Genre: Cookery, chat
- Presented by: Tim Lovejoy; Simon Rimmer; Louise Redknapp (2010–12); Amanda Hamilton (2006–09)
- Country of origin: United Kingdom
- Original language: English

Production
- Running time: 90 minutes
- Production company: Princess Productions

Original release
- Network: BBC Two
- Release: 8 October 2006 – 18 March 2012

Related
- Sunday Brunch

Something for the Weekend is a British television programme, broadcast on BBC Two on Sunday mornings from 2006 until 2012. It features cookery, drinks, interviews with celebrity guests and clips from the week's television, as well as classic clips in the 'Deja View' section. The show was originally presented by Amanda Hamilton, Tim Lovejoy and Simon Rimmer. In 2010, Louise Redknapp replaced Hamilton.

The show was cancelled in 2012, and Lovejoy and Rimmer moved to Channel 4 to front Sunday Brunch, with a similar format.

== Format ==
The show was originally presented by Amanda Hamilton, Tim Lovejoy and chef Simon Rimmer. In 2010, Hamilton left the show and was replaced by Louise Redknapp. A guest presenter was used if one of the main presenters was away. When Hamilton took maternity leave in 2009, her slot was filled by guest presenters including Jenni Falconer, Kellie Shirley and Louise Redknapp. Also in 2009, when Rimmer was forced to take time off due to a leg injury, his role was taken by chefs such as James Tanner.

Each programme usually followed the same format and featured Rimmer (assisted by either Hamilton, Lovejoy, Redknapp and for two of the segments by one of the celebrity guests) cooking a three course meal and a 'lazy brunch' dish, two guest interviews, clips from television programmes shown that week (usually from BBC series), a 'Deja View' clip of an old programme where the presenters and guests guess the year it was first broadcast, a drinks segment with a mixologist (usually either Andy Pearson or Wayne Collins), and a gadget round-up segment called 'Some Things for the Weekend'.

At the end of the show, the presenters and guests sat at a round table and each have a dish that has been cooked in the show. Lovejoy asked the guests questions posed by the public via text and email. The show was recorded at Princess Productions' TV facility at the Whiteleys Centre in Bayswater, London which was also home to Channel 5's weekday programme The Wright Stuff.

== Cancellation and move to Channel 4 ==
Although the show had high ratings and was popular with audiences, in January 2012 it was announced that it would not return after March 2012 due to budget cuts in original daytime programming.

A month later in February 2012, it was announced that Channel 4 had signed new deals with the same production team as well as Lovejoy and Rimmer to launch an almost identical show on the channel, Sunday Brunch.
