= Sheila Cavanagh =

Canadian academic, playwright, and author

Sheila L. Cavanagh
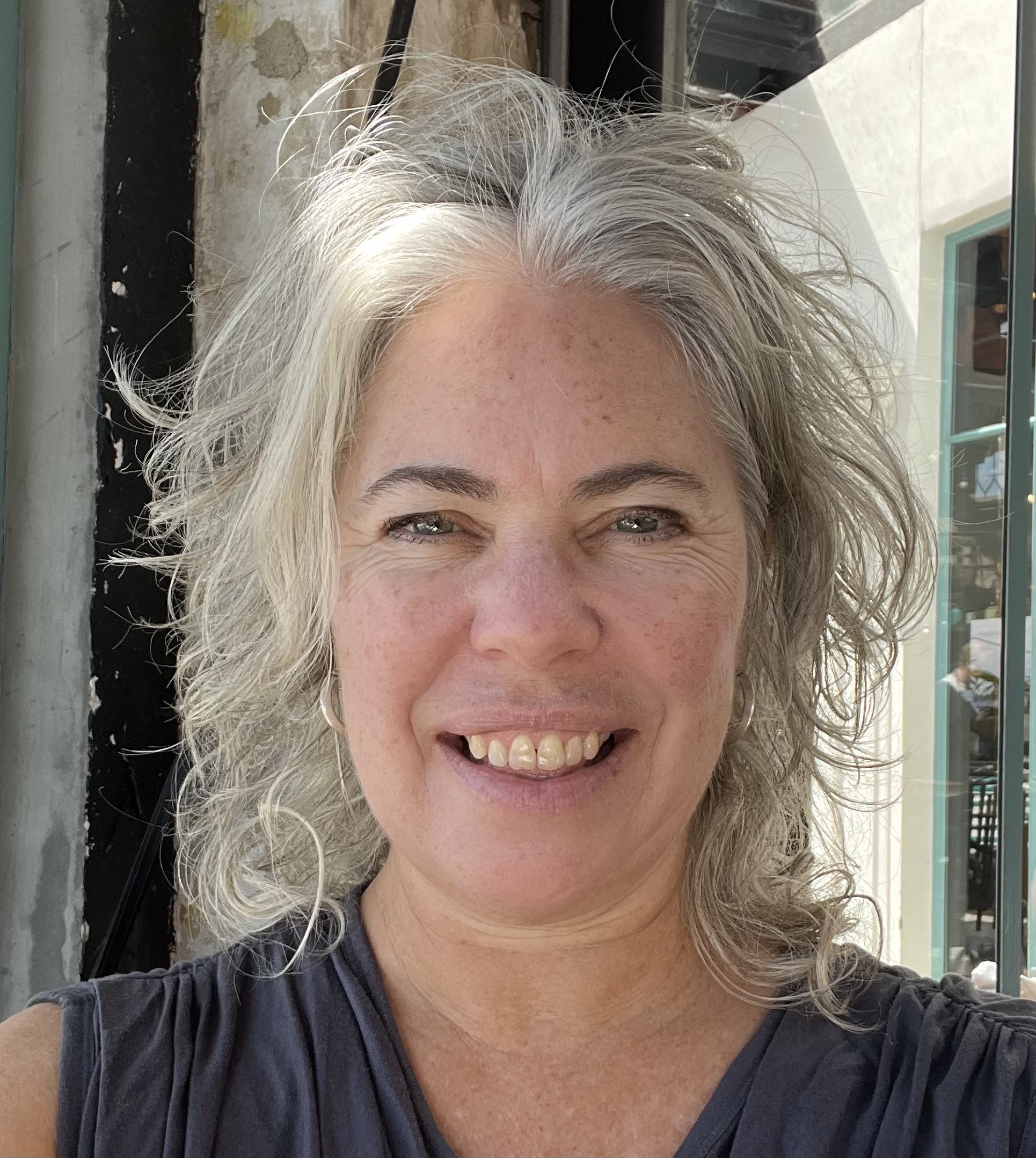
- November 2022
- Occupation: Professor at York University

Academic background
- Education: Ph.D. - Sociology, York University M.A. - Sociology in Education, OISE/University of Toronto B.A. Honours (major and minor) - Sociology and Psychology, York University B.Ed. - Faculty of Education, York University

Sheila L. Cavanagh is a Canadian academic, playwright, and psychotherapist doing a psychoanalytic formation at the Lacan School in San Francisco. She is a professor of sociology and former chair of the Sexuality Studies Program at York University. Cavanagh teaches courses in gender studies, sexuality studies, feminist theory, psychoanalysis, and queer theory. She is best known for her book Queering Bathrooms: Gender, Sexuality, and the Hygienic Imagination (2010) and for a special double-issue she edited on Trans-Psychoanalysis in TSQ: Transgender Studies Quarterly.

== Career ==
Cavanagh received a bachelor's degree from the Faculty of Education and Sociology at York University. She earned a master's from the University of Toronto, Ontario Institute for Studies in Education (OISE) and a Ph.D. in sociology at York University in 1999. After graduating, Cavanagh was hired as an assistant professor in the Department of Women's Studies at Western University.

Cavanagh is currently associate professor of sociology and was formerly the chair of the Sexuality Studies Program at York University. Cavanagh is a former chair of the Canadian Sexuality Studies Association.

== Publications ==
=== Books ===
Cavanagh has written a number of books and articles in the area of gender and sexuality with an emphasis on queer theory and more recently, psychoanalysis. Her first book was titled Sexing the Teacher: School Sex Scandals and Queer Pedagogies (2007). Her second sole-authored book titled Queering Bathrooms: Gender, Sexuality, and the Hygienic Imagination (2010) was a GLBT Indie Book Award finalist and recipient of the CWSA/ACEF Outstanding Scholarship Prize Honourable Mention (2012).

Cavanagh is also co-editor of a collection with Angela Failler and Rachel A. J. Hurst titled Skin, Culture and Psychoanalysis ( 2013)

=== Plays ===
Cavanagh later adapted interview transcripts collected in the process of researching her second book, Queering Bathrooms into a play entitled, Queer Bathroom Monologues (QBM), which premiered at the Toronto Fringe Festival (2011) and was given the Audience Pick Award. QBM was later staged at Buddies in Bad Times Theatre, Toronto, in June 2014 for WorldPride and has subsequently toured at conferences, colleges and universities in Canada and the United States.

=== Articles ===
Cavanagh, Holly Randell-Moon and Iris van der Tuin co-edit Somatechnics, a multi-disciplinary academic journal focusing on ethics, technology and the body. Cavanagh recently Guest Edited a Special Issue of TSQ: Transgender Studies Quarterly, on the topic of transgender and psychoanalysis.

Cavanagh's scholarly articles have been published in Sexualities: Studies in Culture and Society, Body and Society, and European Journal of Psychoanalysis among other journals. She is also regularly interviewed by popular media on issues related to the rights and inclusion of trans* people.
