= Amanda Hamilton =

Scottish nutritionist and broadcaster (born 1974)

- Born: 1974 (age 50–51); Edinburgh, Scotland
- Education: Edinburgh Napier University
- Occupation(s): Nutritionist, broadcaster
- Years active: 2011-present
- Known for: Co-presenter of Something for the Weekend (2007–2009)

Amanda Hamilton (born 1974) is a Scottish businesswoman, broadcaster, and writer in the areas of food, health and nutrition.

== Early life ==
Hamilton was born in Edinburgh, Scotland, to Ann and Ronnie, both physical education teachers. Her father is known for captaining Scotland's volleyball team for over two decades, and for his work as the Scottish Schools' FA President. She has an elder brother, Stewart, who represented Scotland at badminton. Hamilton herself became an international-class badminton player, representing Scotland at under-16 level.

She obtained a degree in Marketing and Communications from Edinburgh Napier University. During the course she undertook a one-year exchange scholarship to study in the United States.

Upon graduation, she became a news reporter for a local television station in Colorado. A fluent Spanish language speaker, she also spent a year in Mexico as a journalist, before returning to her native UK where she undertook a professional qualification in Nutrition. She then moved to the Himalayas, studying Ayurvedic medicine with a local doctor, and yoga.

== Journalist and broadcasting career ==
Between 2005 and 2011 Hamilton co-produced and presented five series of The Spa of Embarrassing Illnesses for UKTV Style. In each series a group of people were gathered together at an exotic spa location where they were helped to conquer embarrassing and intimate health conditions. One series was also shown on BBC Scotland. Hamilton went on to present two spin-off series, Spa of Weight Loss for Life and Teen Spa of Embarrassing Illnesses. The series rights were later bought by US production company 44 Blue.

Hamilton's first real break as a broadcaster came in the UK when she appeared as a nutritionist on the BBC program Should I Worry About...? in 2006, which was presented by Top Gear and Total Wipeout front-man Richard Hammond. In 2007 she appeared as the nutritional expert alongside Professor Ian Philp in the BBC series How to Live Longer in which she and Philp tried to help six volunteers adopt healthier lifestyles.

In 2009 Hamilton appeared as the nutritional expert in the first series of TernTV's The Last Resort in which six volunteers suffering from addictive behaviours were helped to put their addictions behind them in just nine days. The series was broadcast on BBC Northern Ireland.

In 2011 Hamilton co-presented six episodes of Slim Chance: Fix My Family for BBC Northern Ireland. Three families were given nutritional guidance in helping them approach life in a healthier fashion. There came a follow-up programme a year later.

After becoming a nutrition expert on GMTV, Hamilton co-presented the programme series Inch Loss Island, Bikini Diet, and Little Black Dress.

In November 2010 Hamilton was a guest co-presenter on STV's daily lifestyle show The Hour. In January 2011, she presented 28 episodes of STV's New Year, New You series. She is currently one of the presenters on the Landward series on BBC1 Scotland, focusing on health and nutrition.

In 2013 Hamilton acted as the guinea pig in a documentary for ITV's Tonight programme called Food Facts and Figures, the Great British Diet in which for one week she replaced her usual diet with one eaten by a typical British woman, and gained five pounds as a result.

== Nutritionist ==
Alongside her career as a television presenter, Hamilton founded Amanda Hamilton Ltd in 2007, which organises and licenses health and weight-loss retreats in the United Kingdom.

Hamilton was an ambassador in 2008 for the Scottish Executive's Active Nation programme, and in the same year was the face of Cancer Research UK's Great British Breakfast campaign. She was an adviser on the Scottish Government's curriculum for excellence panel on Food & Health. She also writes columns for several health magazines and newspaper supplements.

Hamilton is a member of the British Association of Nutritional Therapists, and a member of The Guild of Health Writers. She is currently studying for an MSc in Obesity Science at Robert Gordon University.

== Books ==
- Hamilton, Amanda. LifeDetox. Piatkus, 2007. ISBN 0-749-92796-8
- Hamilton, Amanda. Life-Changing Weight Loss. Piatkus, 2008. ISBN 0-749-92837-9
- Hamilton, Amanda. Eat, Fast, Slim. Watkins Publishing, 2013. ISBN 1-848-99103-7
