= List of Getting On episodes =

Getting On is an American medical comedy series created by Mark V. Olsen and Will Scheffer, based on the British series of the same name. The series premiered on HBO on November 24, 2013, and stars Laurie Metcalf, Alex Borstein, Niecy Nash, and Mel Rodriguez in the four regular roles.

== Series overview ==
Season	Episodes	Originally released	
Season	Episodes	First released	Last released
1	6	November 24, 2013	December 29, 2013
2	6	November 9, 2014	December 14, 2014
3	6	November 8, 2015	December 13, 2015

== Episodes ==
=== Season 1 (2013) ===
No. overall	No. in season	Title	Directed by	Written by	Original release date	US viewers (millions)
1	1	"Born on the Fourth of July"	Miguel Arteta	Mark V. Olsen & Will Scheffer	November 24, 2013	0.520
Denise "DiDi" Ortley (Niecy Nash), a new nurse at the extended-care ward of Mount Palms Memorial Hospital, is shown the ropes by emotionally insecure head nurse Dawn Forchette (Alex Borstein); Dr. Jenna James (Laurie Metcalf), the ward's self-absorbed temporary director of medicine, clashes with strong-willed supervising nurse Beverly Raymes (Telma Hopkins); due to a language barrier, the staff struggle to deal with a Cambodian patient.
2	2	"If You're Going to San Francisco"	Howard Deutch	Mark V. Olsen & Will Scheffer	December 1, 2013	N/A
After Beverly's reassignment to another floor, new supervising nurse Patsy De La Serda (Mel Rodriguez) arrives at the ward and immediately clashes with the other staff members; Jenna's position as the ward's director of medicine is made permanent, much to her dismay; Varla Pounder (June Squibb), a patient suffering from bipolar disorder, causes trouble for the staff.
3	3	"Make Someone Happy"	Howard Deutch	Mark V. Olsen & Will Scheffer	December 8, 2013	N/A
In an effort to increase the standards of the ward, Patsy introduces a new campaign with a focus on patient satisfaction; patient Birdy Lamb's (Ann Guilbert) boyfriend Leonard Butler (Harry Dean Stanton) arrives at the ward, and their lustful behavior causes trouble for Dawn and DiDi; Patsy misconstrues a joke from DiDi, resulting in him filing a complaint against her; after a date with Patsy, Dawn becomes concerned when Patsy reveals that he may be homosexual.
4	4	"Dumped"	Becky Martin	Mark V. Olsen & Will Scheffer	December 15, 2013	0.521
A homeless patient is "dumped" on the ward; unhappy with Patsy's new campaign, Jenna attempts to replace it with an aerobic fitness program; Phyllis Marmatan (Molly Shannon), the daughter of a patient with cancer, discovers that her mother's chemotherapy has been discontinued; Dawn and Patsy's relationship trouble continues.
5	5	"Nightshift"	Becky Martin	Mark V. Olsen & Will Scheffer	December 22, 2013	0.348
As DiDi attempts to tackle the night shift at the ward alone, Jenna stops by with her husband Richard (Daniel Stern) in order to assist him with an ingrown toenail; after calling the nurse agency for assistance, DiDi is surprised to discover that the agency has sent Dawn, who is drunk after a fight with Patsy; Jenna takes an interest in a Swedish patient named Ingrid Larsen (Gita Hall), who demonstrates that she is much fitter than her age suggests.
6	6	"The Concert"	Howard Deutch	Mark V. Olsen & Will Scheffer	December 29, 2013	0.369
The staff discover that Phyllis' mother is near death; DiDi attempts to obtain money Jenna owes her husband for work he did on her driveway; Cordelia Meade (Irma P. Hall), an unruly patient, causes difficulties for the staff; Jenna, desperate to escape Billy Barnes, covets a job at a prestigious establishment in Cleveland; after having anal sex with Patsy, Dawn attempts to figure out the state of their relationship.

=== Season 2 (2014) ===
No. overall	No. in season	Title	Directed by	Written by	Original release date	US viewers (millions)
7	1	"No Such Thing as Idealized Genitalia"	Miguel Arteta	Mark V. Olsen & Will Scheffer	November 9, 2014	0.309
Jenna conducts a new research study, but is forced to deal with an unhappy participant; Dawn struggles in her new role as Jenna's research assistant; DiDi approaches Patsy for a raise; after a day of personal medical issues, Dawn makes a massive discovery.
8	2	"Is Soap a Hazardous Substance?"	Miguel Arteta	Mark V. Olsen & Will Scheffer	November 16, 2014	0.232
After discovering that she is pregnant, Dawn tries to find a way to tell Patsy; Jenna installs a new hospice-care program into the ward; the staff struggle with assisting Dottie Levy (Betty Buckley), a patient suffering from severe alcoholism; while attempting to investigate her union benefits regarding her pregnancy, Dawn accidentally kick-starts an investigation into the ward's possibly toxic hand sanitizer; Arlene Willy-Weller (Jean Smart), the daughter-in-law of a patient admitted for heart surgery, is told by Jenna that her mother-in-law's state of health may be worse than they thought; Patsy has a medical emergency on the ward.
9	3	"Turnips...North Day...Yes, yes."	Becky Martin	Mark V. Olsen & Will Scheffer	November 23, 2014	0.273
When the entire hospital computer network is shut down due to a virus, confusion consumes the ward; DiDi cancels Arlene's mother-in-law's heart surgery without consulting the surgeon, leading to confusion among Arlene and the ward's staff; Jenna calls a meeting with the hospital committee in an effort to transfer revenue from the hospice-care program into her research studies; Patsy accompanies Dawn to her twelve-week ultrasound, where they discover something unexpected.
10	4	"The 7th Annual Christmas Card Competition"	Becky Martin	Mark V. Olsen & Will Scheffer	November 30, 2014	0.273
Jenna seeks to begin a study on female fecal incontinence; Denya Thorp (Carrie Preston), a patient with terminal ovarian cancer, asks Jenna to euthanize her; DiDi develops a crush on Dr. Parker Owens (LaMonica Garrett), a visiting orthopedic surgeon; an explicit photograph accidentally makes its way into the hospital Christmas card competition; Dawn and Patsy face difficulties in their relationship.
11	5	"The Revolving Door Admit"	Howard Deutch	Mark V. Olsen & Will Scheffer	December 7, 2014	0.226
On a day the ward is swamped with work, the staff struggle to discharge Varla Pounder, a patient who has previously caused trouble on the ward; DiDi's half-sister Sherrie (Lateefah Holder) is working at the ward on a temporary basis, causing tension in their relationship; Patsy gets a confidence boost after receiving an award; Jenna bonds with Dr. Ann Killigrew (Mary Kay Place) in an effort to convince her to support her research studies; an old patient of Jenna's returns.
12	6	"Doctor Death"	Howard Deutch	Mark V. Olsen & Will Scheffer	December 14, 2014	0.209
The illegalities of Jenna's hospice program are exposed, putting her and the rest of the hospital in jeopardy; DiDi discovers that she is being underpaid in her role as hospice-nurse liaison, and goes to Jenna to collect what she is owed; Dawn reveals that she has married security guard Dennis Beardman (Kurtis Bedford), much to everyone's surprise.

=== Season 3 (2015) ===
No. overall	No. in season	Title	Directed by	Written by	Original release date	US viewers (millions)
13	1	"This Is About Vomit, People"	Miguel Arteta	Mark V. Olsen & Will Scheffer	November 8, 2015	0.269
Dr. Ron Rudd (Grant Bowler) arrives at Billy Barnes to replace Dr. Jenna James after the hospice scandal. However, when Dr. James runs into Dr. Rudd, she pretends she's someone else. The staff argue over who should have to clean up vomit on the ground. Dr. James meets with hospice representative Suzi Sasso and discuss how to save their jobs. Patsy confesses to Dawn that he still has feelings for her, and Dawn reveals she's unhappy in her marriage to Dennis. Dawn sees a doctor after a bed-wetting incident and learns she has kidney problems and has to go on dialysis.
14	2	"Don't Let It Get in You or on You"	Miguel Arteta	Mark V. Olsen & Will Scheffer	November 15, 2015	0.240
Dr. James announces Dr. Rudd will be joining the staff, instead of replacing her. The staff take care of several patients infected with a virus from a cruise ship, causing severe diarrhea. Dr. James connects with a patient with pancreatic cancer, who is a survivor from a concentration camp and wants to put her in a clinical trial. However, when Dr. James visits her later, she discovers she died. DiDi's family come to the hospital after they learn she has removed their mother-in-law from a nursing home and into their house. Marguerite opens an envelope which has termination papers for her, Patsy, Dawn, notifying them they will lose their jobs in 60 days. DiDi discovers Dawn in dialysis and comforts her.
15	3	"No, I Don't Want a Fucking Smiley Face"	Miguel Arteta	Mark V. Olsen & Will Scheffer	November 22, 2015	0.262
The staff care for Crystal Buff, an inmate from Sing Sing who is known for escaping and being a pathological liar. Dawn pretends to be Patsy's fiancé when his mother visits as she's still unaware they broke up. DiDi and her family admit their mother-in-law Vivian to Billy Barnes, and DiDi's sister-in-law Yvette is angry at her from removing Vivian from the nursing home and how much money extended care would cost. Dr. James refuses to let two other female doctors on a panel for her symposium. The fact that Dawn has kidney disease is revealed to the staff, and while distracted, Crystal escapes.
16	4	"Am I Still Me?"	Miguel Arteta	Mark V. Olsen & Will Scheffer	November 29, 2015	0.321
Patsy reveals to the staff that he is, indeed, gay. Birdy's health continues to decline due to her pneumonia. Dr. James informs DiDi's family that Vivian has two major infections. DiDi's family wants to remove her from the hospital and put her into boarding care. Dr. Pippa Moore and nurse Denise Flixster (Vicki Pepperdine and Joanna Scanlan reprising their roles from the British series) arrive for the symposium. While calling her husband, Dr. James is informed that her mother has died. Shortly after, she is confronted by Dr. Stickley, who tells her they're having a meeting to discuss the closing of certain wards, which includes Billy Barnes. Dawn continues to thrive in dialysis. DiDi realizes Birdy is about to die and comforts her in her final moments. At the symposium, Dr. Moore wins the Helen Tillman award, and Dr. James accuses her of stealing her work.
17	5	"Please Partake of a Memorial Orange"	Miguel Arteta	Mark V. Olsen & Will Scheffer	December 6, 2015	0.318
Varla is readmitted to Billy Barnes and meets her long lost daughter, Marla (Kristen Johnston), a scientologist. Dawn desperately tries to find a live kidney donor after self-sabotaging her health. Dr. James's husband, Richard, begins unraveling a number of her lies. At the hospital's memorial service, Dawn and Dr. James both interrupt the proceedings with their personal crises, with Jenna ultimately offering up her kidney to Dawn. When they return to work, they discover their ward has been closed.
18	6	"Reduced to Eating Boiled Magazines and Book Paste"	Miguel Arteta	Mark V. Olsen & Will Scheffer	December 13, 2015	0.263
Dr. James has second thoughts about donating her kidney, especially after discovering Dawn's dishonesty about her situation. DiDi and other hospital staff go on strike to protest the closure. Dawn accidentally sets fire to the ward, resulting in a mass evacuation. Everyone escapes relatively unharmed, while making sure their patients are safe as well. The final scene shows Dawn and Dr. James about to undergo the kidney transplant.
