= 15 Minute Musical =

- Genre: Comedy
- Running time: 15 Minutes
- Country of origin: United Kingdom
- Language: English
- Home station: BBC Radio 4
- Starring: Richie Webb; Dave Lamb; Vicki Pepperdine; Mel Hudson; Alex Lowe; Jess Robinson; Pippa Evans
- Written by: Richie Webb; David Quantick; Dave Cohen
- Produced by: Katie Tyrrell
- Original release: October 2004
- No. of series: 8
- No. of episodes: 56
- Website: Radio 4

15 Minute Musical is a comedy series on BBC Radio 4 written by Richie Webb, David Quantick and Dave Cohen. Each episode is in a different musical style with a story featuring current celebrities and politicians. The show won the 2009 Writers' Guild Award for Best Radio Comedy.

== Episodes ==
The first series aired from October 2004 and featured the following episodes:

1. Brothers in Arms — A rock musical about Tony Blair, Gordon Brown and the 1994 Labour Party leadership race
2. Jeffrey! — A Gilbert and Sullivan style operetta portraying the rise and fall of Jeffrey Archer
3. BollyWindsor — A Bollywood romp starring the Royal Family
4. Calamity Dave — An Oklahoma! pastiche about the life of David Beckham
5. Horror Tory — Michael Howard and Ann Widdecombe plot their next move in Rocky Horror style
6. The Elton Story — Ben Elton sells his soul in an Andrew Lloyd Webber twee-fest

The second series aired from December 2005, featuring:

1. Blunketto — An Italian opera charting life of David Blunkett
2. Simon Smug and The Crap Factory — Simon Cowell and his fellow judges come a cropper in a Roald Dahl musical scenario
3. George W Formby Does It Again — George W. Bush tries to save the world armed with his ukulele
4. Food! — Celebrity chefs enrol in Delia Smith's Fame Academy
5. Nice Hair — A Sixties love-in with Robert Kilroy-Silk
6. My Foul-Mouthed Lady — Madonna and Guy Ritchie try to change themselves into something they're not

The third series aired from August 2006, featuring:

1. Manager Mia — A tribute to former England football manager Sven-Göran Eriksson and the songs of ABBA
2. S.S. Metaphor — Kate Moss and Pete Doherty star in an unbreakable love affair on an unsinkable ship
3. Oh! What a Lovely Blair — Field Marshal Corporal Lieutenant General Tony Blair in the trenches
4. The Court of King Michael of Parkinson — Who will take Michael Parkinson's prog rock chat show throne?
5. The Blue Brothers — Dave 'Cocaine' Cameron and Boris 'Bonkers' Johnson are on a mission – to save the Conservative Party orphanage
6. The Three Smugateers — Chris Martagnan and friends make the world safe for his p'tit bébé, Pomme

The fourth series aired from September 2007, featuring:

1. Westminster Side Story — Gordon Brown and David Cameron are the two gang leaders with nothing to fight about.
2. Life on Noel — Noel Edmonds wakes up in 2007 and is desperate to return to 1973.
3. How Do You Stop a Woman Like Camilla? — Camilla Parker Bowles leaves the convent to help look after Charles Von Windsor's huge family of two boys.
4. When You Wish upon a Car — A tornado dumps Jeremy Clarkson under the rainbow in the Land of Oz.
5. The Princess and the Frog Chorus — A fairytale about young princess Heather (Mills) and not-so-young prince Paul (McCartney).
6. Around the World in 15 Minutes — in which Tony Phileas Blair takes a bet from Gordon Brown.

The fifth series aired from November 2008, featuring:

1. Washington High School Musical — Barack Obama and Hillary Clinton compete to be President of Washington High.
2. Ramsey Todd — Gordon Ramsay Todd finds a new ingredient that makes his pies the talk of London Town.
3. We're All Going on an Olympic Odyssey — London 2012 is fast approaching and the country is relying on Boris Johnson.
4. Cleggarella — Feeling unloved and unnoticed, Liberal Democrats leader Nick Clegg is granted three wishes.
5. Pappa Pia — Piers Morgan discovers that his father is one of three reality show judges.
6. A Christmas Gordon — Gordon Brown is visited by the ghosts of Christmas Past, Present and Future.

The sixth series aired in December 2010:

1. Dr Bruce — Bruce Forsyth plays Doctor Who to defend his place in the Saturday night TV schedule
2. The Lying King — Nick Clegg goes into coalition with the Conservatives.
3. Mary Poppin-up-at-the-last-minute-to-score-the-winner — the coaching style of Fabio Capello
4. Thoroughly Modern Miliband — the Labour leadership election
5. Just the Two Tone of Us — about Ant and Dec.
6. QuadraQueenia — about a year in the life of HM The Queen

The seventh series aired over Christmas 2012:

1. A Right Royal Cockney Christmas - Upstairs Downton with the Windsors and the Middletons. Plus a spoons solo. First broadcast: 25 Dec 2012
2. Brian Cox in Brian Elliott, - about a boy who D-reams of being a Scientist. First broadcast: 26 Dec 2012
3. The Ozfather - The rise and rise of Rupert Murdoch, and how he came to Britain to build a media empire. First broadcast: 27 Dec 2012
4. The Reducers - Can the coalition cash in by crashing out at the next election? First broadcast: 28 Dec 2012
5. Licence to Kil...marnock - Special Agent Ond, Alex Salm-Ond, is pitted against old foe Dr No Vote, Alistair Darling. First broadcast: 31 Dec 2012
6. Barack of Ages - Barack Obama struggles to find the strength to fight for the American presidency. First broadcast: 1 Jan 2013

The eighth series aired over Christmas 2013:

1. It's A One-Hit-Wonderful Life - Simon Cowell contemplates career suicide until Susan Boyle turns up. First broadcast: 24 Dec 2013
2. Julian and the Assanging Technicolour Download - the Really Useless story of Julian Assange is Wiki-leaked. First broadcast: 25 Dec 2013
3. The Last Days of Farage - the trials and tribulations of Nigel Farage as he struggles to keep Britpop out of the EU. First broadcast: 26 Dec 2013
4. Heaven Knows I'm Middle-Aged Now - Can Morrissey make a comeback? Can David Bowie and Lady Gaga help? Can Paul McCartney find someone who hasn't heard his Yesterday anecdote yet? First broadcast: 27 Dec 2013
5. Half A Sixth Form - Michael Gove Steeles himself to teach David Cameron a thing or two about education reform. First broadcast: 30 Dec 2013
6. Ra Ra It's Putin - A visit to the Funky Federation of Russia as Vladimir Putin finds himself within a non-traditional disco setup. First broadcast 31 Dec 2013

Two Xmas 2015 episodes aired over Christmas 2015:

1. Seven Bribes for Seven Blatters - Sepp Blatter hasn't had the easiest of years, as he faces allegations of corruption. First broadcast: 28 Dec 2015
2. Jeremy Corbyn Superstar! - Jeremy Corbyn (JC) has gone from backbench obscurity to Leader of the Opposition in the past twelve months, but will his followers betray him? First broadcast: 31 Dec 2015

Two Xmas 2016 episodes aired over Christmas 2016:

1. Lady and the Trump - The US Elections are given a much needed Disney-style fairy tale make over. The most loved songs for the least loved candidates.
2. Cabarexit - Come join the Cabarexit! Cabaret meets Brexit - can we turn the EU referendum into a sexy, sassy, sensationalised, sublime sounding musical?

Two Xmas 2017 episodes aired over Christmas 2017:

1. The Legend of Holy Superior Mother Theresa May and the Magic Money Tree - Theresa May stars in an Irish folk musical about the quest to find a magic money tree. First broadcast: 25 Dec 2017
2. Dud Brothers - a separated-at-birth story about Jeremy Corbyn and Jacob Rees-Mogg. First broadcast: 26 Dec 2017

Two Xmas 2018 episodes aired over Christmas 2018:

1. Eurovision Gone Wrong Contest - A Eurovision Song Contest-inspired performance from Europe's leading politicians as they look back on their action-packed 2018s. First broadcast: 31 Dec 2018
2. The Sixth in Line To Be King And I - A Rodgers and Hammerstein-inspired celebration of all things Meghan Markle. First broadcast: 1 Jan 2019

== Notes ==
- Richie Webb and Vicki Pepperdine also performed a one-minute musical on 28 Acts in 28 Minutes on Radio 4.
- A 30-minute spoof documentary featuring Mark Lawson interviewing the non-existent composer Sir Richard Von Webber (played by Richie Webb) about his life's work, aired in December 2006 on Radio 4. The show managed to include an excerpt from all eighteen musicals to date.
- The third and fourth series are available on CD.
- Series 1, 2, 3, 5 and 6 were recorded at The Drill Hall in London. Series 4, 7 and 8 were recorded at the BBC Radio Theatre.
