= The Hudson and Pepperdine Show =

2000s BBC Radio 4 show

The Hudson and Pepperdine Show is a comedy sketch show vehicle on BBC Radio 4 (repeated on BBC Radio 4 Extra) for the duo Melanie Hudson and Vicki Pepperdine. Four series have been broadcast, in 2000 (4 episodes), 2001 (4 episodes), 2003 (6 episodes) and 2005 (6 episodes, of which 5 were broadcast). They also did a single Afternoon Play in 2008 titled Hudson and Pepperdine Save the Planet. Other regular cast members include Martin Hyder, Jim North, and Dave Lamb.

The show has the premise of Hudson and Pepperdine as flatmates who present a radio show from their flat, with comedy deriving from visitors to the flat and the situations in which the duo find themselves. However, the show differs from a sitcom as the interactions of Hudson and Pepperdine simply serve to link together more traditional sketch based material with strands featuring a men's support group; rough neighbourhood girls; Edie Trinder, a pastiche of wartime radio comedy; and their upstairs neighbours, the 'Dirty Sloanes'. The show theme music is a customised version of Barry Manilow's "Copacabana".

The planned first show for the fourth and most recent series, scheduled to be broadcast on 7 July 2005, was pulled due to that day's terrorist attacks in London as it depicted Mel and Vicki's interaction with the government's emergency warning leaflet.

The Hudson and Pepperdine Show excerpt
Mel and Vicki get to grips with feng shui. Excerpt from series 1, episode 1, 1m57s.
