= List of Animals episodes =

Animals is an American animated comedy television series created by Phil Matarese and Mike Luciano.

== Series overview ==
Season	Episodes	Originally released	
Season	Episodes	First released	Last released
Web series	6	August 13, 2012	March 20, 2013
1	10	February 5, 2016	April 8, 2016
2	10	March 17, 2017	May 19, 2017
3	10	August 3, 2018	October 5, 2018

== Episodes ==
=== Web series (2012–13) ===
No. in series	Title	Directed and written by	Original release date
1	"Pigeons."	Phil Matarese & Mike Luciano	August 13, 2012
Two birds tweet about life in the big city.
2	"Rats."	Phil Matarese & Mike Luciano	September 10, 2012
Two rats debate what to bring to a picnic.
3	"Roaches."	Phil Matarese & Mike Luciano	October 8, 2012
A spilled blue slurpee excites two roaches. Guest starring John Darnielle as Joe Roach.
4	"Horses."	Phil Matarese & Mike Luciano	November 12, 2012
Horses trade stories from work, with dire consequences.
5	"Pigeons. (1)"	Phil Matarese & Mike Luciano	February 19, 2013
The pigeons talk to a girl, but is she out of their league? Guest starring Meghan O'Neill as Meghan.
6	"Pigeons. (2)"	Phil Matarese & Mike Luciano	March 20, 2013
Our heroes encounter a dead human, and get blood on their hands... er, wings. Guest starring Meghan O'Neill as Meghan. Music: "With Friends Like These" by Stereolab.

=== Season 1 (2016) ===
No. overall	No. in season	Title	Directed by	Written by	Original release date	US viewers (millions)
1	1	"Rats. (1)"	Phil Matarese & Mike Luciano	Phil Matarese & Mike Luciano	February 5, 2016	0.239
After witnessing the unintentional death of a hooker by the mayor, two rats named Mike and Phil attend a party where it is discovered that Phil has never made babies while Mike raises his newborn daughter Rebecca as she grows into an adult over the course of the party. As Phil falls in love with Rebecca, he learns that he ate rat poison and spends his final moments finally having sex with Rebecca raising their son Phil Jr. Meanwhile two police horses (voiced by Paul Scheer and Matt Walsh) discuss a friend who has become a race horse; also two bed bugs (voiced by Mark Duplass and Rob Corddry) move into the mayor's pubic hair and talk about one of their divorce and subsequent midlife crisis. Guest starring Jason Mantzoukas as Fink, Nathan Fielder as DJ Lab Rat, Mary Holland as Bow Rat, Katie Aselton as Rebecca, Jet Eveleth as Scarf Rat, Jennifer LaFleur as Wife, and Steve Zissis as Husband.
2	2	"Pigeons. (1)"	Phil Matarese & Mike Luciano	Phil Matarese & Mike Luciano	February 12, 2016	0.235
As the mayor deals with a blackmailer who took pictures of him with the hooker, unaware that one of his goons is an undercover detective, a golf ball hits a sleeping Phil's nest as he believes it to be an egg he laid. He joins his friend Mike and Mike's wife Megan to their son Jacob's Little Flyers Club where Mike is challenged to race to the Green Lady with the Ice Cream Thingy by Jerry, a pigeon from New Jersey (voiced by Nick Kroll). Meanwhile two caterpillars named Alan and Brian (voiced by Ike Barinholtz and Zach Woods) respectively, deal with one of their metamorphoses. Guest starring Lauren Lapkus as Jacob, Meghan O'Neill as Megan, Joe Mande as Branch, Scott Aukerman as Drug Dealer, Bartholomew Birdman, and Andrée Vermeulen as Clarissa.
3	3	"Cats. (1)"	Phil Matarese & Mike Luciano & Wes Archer	Phil Matarese & Mike Luciano	February 19, 2016	0.188
As the mayor's wife is having an affair with her husband's opponent in the upcoming mayoral campaign, her pet cats Mike and Phil discuss their plans for the day when they are interrupted by an alley cat at the window named Alex (voice by Eric André). Mike and Phil let Alex in to use the kitty litter and give him a tour of their apartment where he steals various things. But when Alex comes clean after seeing how friendly his hosts are, he learns that Mike and Phil are crazed sociopaths and barely escapes being tortured by them. Meanwhile, a goose named Shane (voiced by Adam Scott) explores Central Park and meets a swan named Olivia (voiced by Molly Shannon) who is led to believe that Shane is a Black Swan. His secret is found out later at a club and has to come clean. Guest starring Neil Casey as Max and Justin Roiland as H&M.
4	4	"Dogs."	Phil Matarese & Mike Luciano & Dominic Polcino	Phil Matarese & Mike Luciano	February 26, 2016	0.282
A Papillon named Phil is taken to a dog park, which is viewed as a prison by the dogs in it. Phil is challenged to a showdown by a poodle named Angela (voiced by Chelsea Peretti). Phil and a pug named Mike plan an escape to avoid the showdown. Meanwhile, a secret is revealed among four dogs being walked; two dogs, Rusty and Princess (voiced by Kumail Nanjiani and Ellie Kemper respectively), met on a first date. Guest starring Aziz Ansari as Charles, Rory Scovel as Ronnie, Lauren Lapkus as Hollie, Mary Holland as Mabel, Stephanie Allynne as Josie, and Erin Whitehead as Sugar.
5	5	"Rats. (2)"	Phil Matarese & Mike Luciano & Wes Archer	Phil Matarese & Mike Luciano	March 4, 2016	0.290
As the mayor covers up the death of a business partner who overdosed, a teenaged Phil Jr. takes credit for the pants that his friend Mike invented to impress a girl he has a crush on. Meanwhile, two moths (voiced by Duncan Trussell and Kate Berlant) talk to their friend Kevin (voiced by Pete Holmes) as he tries neon light for the first time while a fish couple (voiced by Thomas Lennon and Kerri Kenney) argue in front of another couple (voiced by Mary Holland and Tim Baltz) during dinner, causing a tense situation. Guest starring Alia Shawkat as Sharon, Ali Wong, as Dana, Marc Maron as Rat Marc Maron, Neil Casey as Reporter & Security Guard, Kate Berlant as Fashion Rat 1, John Early as Fashion Rat 2, James Kyson as Floor Manager, Amir Blumenfeld as Chinese Food Rat 1, Jake Hurwitz as Chinese Food Rat 2, Meghan O'Neill as Announcer, and Declan Carter as Child Rat.
6	6	"Pigeons. (2)"	Phil Matarese & Mike Luciano & Dominic Polcino	Phil Matarese & Mike Luciano	March 11, 2016	0.247
Pigeon Phil runs into trouble after being reunited with the father who abandoned him while Mike struggles to encourage his son to be a seagull scout. Meanwhile, two turtles fight over the love of a mechanical frog while a skunk learns the truth about his date's past as a sexual deviant. Guest starring Mitch Hurwitz as Larry, Lauren Lapkus as Jacob, Meghan O'Neill as Meghan, Horatio Sanz as Julio, Jessica St. Clair as Kaitlin, Lennon Parham as Ashley, Ben Schwartz as Antonio, and Nicole Byer as Stephanie.
7	7	"Flies."	Phil Matarese & Mike Luciano & Wes Archer	Phil Matarese & Mike Luciano	March 18, 2016	0.187
Within the course of a day, a pair of flies experience the highs and lows of life in all its stages; a self-conscious horse is encouraged to let it out; bodega-dwelling cats rap. Guest starring Lawrence Matarese as Phil's Dad, Liz Luciano as Mike's Mom, Robert Morse as Old Phil, Jack Axelrod as Old Mike, Meghan O'Neill as Eliza, Wanda Sykes as Chance, Cobie Smulders as Anni, ASAP Ferg and ASAP Rocky as the rapping Bodega Cats.
8	8	"Squirrels (1) Part I."	Phil Matarese & Mike Luciano & Dominic Polcino	Phil Matarese & Mike Luciano	March 25, 2016	0.256
The mayor attempts to smear the politician by planting drugs in his house. But as all hell breaks loose when the mayor learns the politician was sleeping with his wife, two squirrel brothers find their survival skills tested while on a journey to freedom after their tree was knocked down by lightning. Meanwhile, at a pet shop, a snake and her mouse prey face off while pet store puppies settle a turf war. Guest starring Claudia O'Doherty as April, Katie Aselton as Mom, Jay Duplass as Dennis, Jake Hurwitz as Older Bully, Amir Blumenfeld as Younger Bully, Mindy Sterling as Psychic Lady, Kurt Vile as Kurt Vile, Jon Lovitz as Old Ben, Jenny Slate as Snake, Gabe Leidman as Mouse, Shawn Wayans as Tommy, Marlon Wayans as Ry-Ry, and John Witherspoon as Jimmy.
9	9	"Squirrels (1) Part II."	Phil Matarese & Mike Luciano & Dominic Polcino	Phil Matarese & Mike Luciano	April 1, 2016	0.149
While the mayor managed to cover up the deaths of the politician and the detective, the latter having sent his intel to the news media, the squirrel brothers' adventure concludes with narration by Jon Lovitz.
10	10	"Turkeys."	Phil Matarese & Mike Luciano & Wes Archer	Phil Matarese & Mike Luciano	April 8, 2016	0.246
Having lost his wife, a turkey vows a vendetta against the mayor who picks him to be pardoned during the Macy's Thanksgiving Day Parade at the same time that Phil Jr. and Mike come to the surface despite warnings of the "giant demons". The turkey gets his chance of revenge when the mayor's illegal activities are revealed, shooting him dead before later dying from his own injuries. The season ends with Phil Jr. and Mike abducted as test subjects at a laboratory.

=== Season 2 (2017) ===
No. overall	No. in season	Title	Directed by	Written by	Original release date	US viewers (millions)
11	1	"Rats. (3)"	Phil Matarese & Mike Luciano	Phil Matarese & Mike Luciano	March 17, 2017	0.275
After being abducted as lab rats for Pesci Co., Phil Jr. and Mike begin to lose their grip on reality as they enter a love triangle with an imaginary friend. Meanwhile, two fleas ponder life while stuck on a monkey's back; an algae questions its existence. Guest starring Emilia Clarke as Lumpy, Katie Aselton as Phil's Mom, Neil Casey as Reporter, Michael Rapaport as Erik, and Jason Alexander as Algae.
12	2	"Pigeons. (3)"	Phil Matarese & Mike Luciano	Phil Matarese & Mike Luciano	March 24, 2017	0.206
As a virus sweeps New York, pigeon Mike's son Jacob expresses jealousy over his angelic little brother before it turns into guilt when his negligence got his brother killed. The resulting guilt trip, spurred further by his parents' grief, sends Jacob on a wacky spirit quest that teaches him about courage and responsibility; two foxes rap about their tough life on the city streets. Guest starring Big Boi & Killer Mike as the rapping Foxes and Alex Borstein as Lois Griffin
13	3	"Roaches."	Phil Matarese & Mike Luciano	Phil Matarese & Mike Luciano	March 31, 2017	0.228
When an exterminator puts a roach town in crisis, the survivors band together to travel to the world outside of their wall and guarantee the survival of their species; a group of seagulls, stuck together by a piece of litter, struggle to live their lives as one.
14	4	"Squirrels. (2)"	Phil Matarese & Mike Luciano	Phil Matarese & Mike Luciano	April 7, 2017	0.232
With New York City quarantined and in disarray, squirrels Mike and Phil prepare for their mother's remarriage. As Mike tries to impress a female guest, Phil plots to stop the wedding, squaring off with his soon-to-be little step-brother, the attention hog Mason.
15	5	"Humans."	Phil Matarese & Mike Luciano	Phil Matarese & Mike Luciano	April 14, 2017	N/A
Inside the headquarters of evil conglomerate Pesci Co., the unscrupulous Dr. Labcoat prepares for the roll out of the 'Green Pill,' a mysterious cure for the virus plaguing New York City which would turn those who ingest it into his slaves.
16	6	"Rats. (4)"	Phil Matarese & Mike Luciano	Phil Matarese & Mike Luciano	April 21, 2017	0.241
Rat teens Mike and Phil Jr. plot to exploit a human baby for profit, but things take a dark turn as the stakes increase; Two bees fight over the love of a tulip.
17	7	"Cats (2) Part I."	Phil Matarese & Mike Luciano	Phil Matarese & Mike Luciano	April 28, 2017	0.265
As rival alley-cat crews face off for control of the streets of Little Italy, a young feline rises to the top of the pack; three owls gather for Christmas celebrations.
18	8	"Cats (2) Part II."	Phil Matarese & Mike Luciano	Phil Matarese & Mike Luciano	May 5, 2017	0.247
The power struggle among New York's feline gangs continues; Phil takes charge while Mike looks for a way out.
19	9	"Worms Birds Possums."	Phil Matarese & Mike Luciano	Phil Matarese & Mike Luciano	May 12, 2017	0.239
Two ends of a worm search for love and independence; a pair of newly-hatched bluebirds fight for survival; an opossum father and son butt heads over the reality of being predators.
20	10	"Dog."	Phil Matarese & Mike Luciano	Phil Matarese & Mike Luciano	May 19, 2017	0.231
An old dog, Dorothy (voiced by Whoopi Goldberg) reflects on her life and doles out sage advice as her owner, the news reporter, has a final confrontation with Dr. Labcoat after he barricaded himself in Pesci Co. Meanwhile, Mike and Phil Jr. appear to be going their separate ways as their high school graduation approaches. The season ends with Dr. Labcoat wiping out the entire human populace of New York including himself with the animals taking charge. Guest Starring: Katie Aselton as Phil's Mom, Neil Casey as Principal Leif, Beth Grant as Auntie May, Nino Luciano as Mike's Dad, Liz Luciano as Mike's Mom, Jason Paige as Phil and Mike Singing, Nick Hexum as himself, SA Martinez as himself

=== Season 3 (2018) ===
No. overall	No. in season	Title	Directed by	Written by	Original release date	US viewers (millions)
21	1	"Rats. (5)"	Phil Matarese & Mike Luciano	Phil Matarese & Mike Luciano	August 3, 2018	0.165
Three years after Doctor Labcoat wiped out the entire human populace of New York City, called "Green Day", two Army personnel (Demi Moore and Mel Rodriguez) based out of New Jersey assigned two soldiers (Phil Matarese and Mike Luciano) to oversee the city that people can't go into via video feed. The animals of New York City turned it into little kingdoms: Rat Town, Ye Olde Horseburg, Squirrel Square, Dog Centre, GrabbagVille, Pigeon Heights and The Democratic People's Republic of Kitty City. The two rats, Phil Jr. and Mike, go on a Dude, Where's My Car?-like quest and encounter multiple species and terrors along the way. Guest starring Bob Balaban as Bob Balaban, Amanda Seales as Tia/Waitress 1, Mary Holland as Lillie/Waitress 2, Neil Casey as Principal Leif, and Andy Dick as Andy/Ruber Driver
22	2	"Dogs. (2)"	Phil Matarese & Mike Luciano	Phil Matarese & Mike Luciano	August 10, 2018	0.195
In a post-owner world, dog Phil struggles to adapt, fighting to steer away from human dependency. Guest starring John Leguizamo as Fluffy, Brandon Johnson as Ringo, Princess Nokia as Chi Chi, Jon Gabrus as McManus, Cheri Oteri as Nurse Deb, and Steve Dildarian as Tim
23	3	"Wallet."	Phil Matarese & Mike Luciano	Phil Matarese & Mike Luciano	August 17, 2018	0.208
The heroic saga of a diminutive, but fiercely heroic bird who makes his way to Pigeon Heights, where he is tasked with saving the day. Guest starring John Mulaney as Olafur/Mackerel, Lauren Lapkus as Jacob/Old Woman/Sheila, Gina Rodriguez as narrator, Meghan O'Neill as Meghan/Nun/Orphan, Tom Bergeron as himself, and Satumi Matsuzaki as Teatime
24	4	"Horses."	Phil Matarese & Mike Luciano	Phil Matarese & Mike Luciano	August 24, 2018	0.210
In the new classist society that's been established among the equine community, a rich horse's daughter finds herself in a love triangle. Guest starring Jameela Jamil as Julia, Jared Harris as Mr. Budmeizer, Michael Sheen as Trotts/Motts, Marianne Jean-Baptiste as Grace, Tim Meadows as Orville, and Joe Wengert as Priest
25	5	"Stuff."	Phil Matarese & Mike Luciano	Phil Matarese & Mike Luciano	August 31, 2018	0.136
After a freak accident brings an assorted pile of random objects to life, the sentient items experience all of life's ups and downs before the effects wear off. Paper Mike, the only remaining animate object, uses his genius to develop a machine to enable the animals to understand each other. Guest starring Anthony Mackie as Receipt, Tracy Morgan as Toaster, Aisha Tyler as Shoe, Natasha Lyonne as VHS Copy of "Hardly Can't Wait", Johnny Knoxville as Johnny Rat Town, Lucy Liu as Yumi and Carol Kane as Chompy
26	6	"At a Loss for Words When We Needed Them Most (Or... The Rise and Fall of GrabbagVille)."	Phil Matarese & Mike Luciano	Phil Matarese & Mike Luciano	September 7, 2018	0.166
The inter-species residents of GrabbagVille face drama when given the ability to communicate with one another along with the reptiles attempting to conquer them, the GrabbagVille residents rebuilding their home while reverse-engineering portable translation devices for all of New York's animals. Guest starring Lucy Liu as Yumi
27	7	"The Trial."	Phil Matarese & Mike Luciano	Phil Matarese & Mike Luciano	September 14, 2018	0.171
As soldiers Phil and Mike finally decide to sell out to the Labcoats after their isolation finally gets to them, rats Phil Jr. and Mike settle their debate over the best comedian being either Jim Carrey or Adam Sandler in what the animal community considers the trial of the century.
28	8	"The Democratic People's Republic of Kitty City."	Phil Matarese & Mike Luciano	Phil Matarese & Mike Luciano	September 21, 2018	0.226
Following the verdict of Jim Carrey vs. Adam Sandler, Phil Jr. and Mike are forced back together on a diplomacy trip into hostile feline territory. But they learn it, and its despotic leaders, were a ruse as Phil decides to bring everyone together in a big music festival he names Roachella. Meanwhile, motivated by treason to save the animals from being blown up by the government, soldiers Phil and Mike are caught while revealed to be on a reality gameshow. Guest starring Lucy Liu as Yumi
29	9	"So You Think You Won't Treason?!."	Phil Matarese & Mike Luciano	Phil Matarese & Mike Luciano	September 28, 2018	0.175
Since the "Green Day" incident, the American government set up a gameshow that roots out potential traitors with soldiers Phil and Mike having lasted for three years before they finally break with a faked message from the Labcoats. The two are then brought up to be horrifically tortured when the real Labcoats, under a brainwashed Executive 3, appear to rescue them while sabotaging the government's plans to bomb New York. Guest starring: Neil Casey as Executive 3, Kate Berlant as Sapphire, Jacquie Barnbrook as Bam Bam, Terrance Wentz as David Spade, Emily Emmersen as Daughter, and Sophie Mackenzie Nack as Child Singer
30	10	"Roachella."	Phil Matarese & Mike Luciano	Phil Matarese & Mike Luciano	October 5, 2018	0.201
Rats Phil and Mike hold the Roachella music festival, only for chaos to ensue among the animals through a group of Jim Carrey-supporters furious at the Carrey vs. Sandler verdict and the humans' nuclear missile. The crisis is averted, but the series ends with the fully unified animals openly declaring war on the humans. Guest starring Awkwafina as Annie, Edie Falco as Psycho, David Harbour as Hawk, Dinosaur Jr. as beaver versions of Themselves, Donna Lewis as a rat version of Herself, Anthony Mackie as Receipt, Tatiana Maslany as Sherman, Moby as a pig version of Himself, Jacob Tremblay as Nuke
