= Richie Webb =

British comedy writer, actor and composer

Richie Webb is a British comedy writer, actor and composer. He was educated at Wolverhampton Grammar School.

He is a composer of music for television – often with partner music producer Matt Katz – contributing to many comedy, entertainment and children's programmes, most notably The reboot of the classic British children’s television series Teletubbies and Horrible Histories, the multi-award-winning CBBC sketch show where Webb's music is regarded as a key ingredient of the show's success. He has also won a BAFTA award.

As a writer and performer he is perhaps best known for his work on numerous BBC Radio 4 comedy programmes. He began his career as a member of The Cheese Shop and went on to have regular musical comedy slots on both Week Ending and Parsons and Naylor's Pull-Out Sections. He is currently creator and star of 15 Minute Musical which won the Writers' Guild Award for Best Radio Comedy and writes and stars in BBC Radio 4's "The Music Teacher".

Along with Dave Lamb and other Warwick University alumni he runs a radio production company Top Dog Productions, which makes comedy and drama for BBC Radio 4.

He lives in Warwickshire, and has a season ticket for West Bromwich Albion F.C.
