= Rhona (TV series) =

- Starring: Rhona Cameron
- Country of origin: United Kingdom

Production
- Running time: 30mins

Original release
- Network: BBC Two
- Release: 2000

Rhona was a Scottish television sitcom starring Rhona Cameron. It was the first British LGBT sitcom. The show was critically panned.

== Cast ==
- Rhona Cameron as Rhona
- Mel Giedroyc as Lisa
- Dave Lamb as Geoff
- Janet Brown as Mother
- Vicki Pepperdine as Ally

== Episode listing ==
No.	Episode	Air Date
1	"The Rain"	25 July 2000
2	"The Tailor"	1 August 2000
3	"The Birthday Girl"	8 August 2000
4	"The Happy Jeans"	15 August 2000
5	"The Fridge"	22 August 2000
6	"The Haircut"	29 August 2000
