= Animals (American TV series) =

American animated television series

- Genre: Comedy
- Created by: Phil Matarese; Mike Luciano
- Based on: Animals by Phil Matarese; Mike Luciano
- Written by: Phil Matarese; Mike Luciano
- Directed by: Phil Matarese; Mike Luciano
- Voices of: Phil Matarese; Mike Luciano
- Composer: Julian Wass
- Country of origin: United States
- Original language: English
- No. of seasons: 3
- No. of episodes: 30 (list of episodes)

Production
- Executive producers: Phil Matarese; Mike Luciano; Mark Duplass; Jay Duplass
- Producers: James A. Fino; Kenny Micka; Jen Roskind; Joe Russo; Josh Polon
- Running time: 22–30 minutes
- Production companies: HBO Entertainment; Karen BBQ; Duplass Brothers Television; Starburns Industries

Original release
- Network: HBO
- Release: February 5, 2016 – October 5, 2018

Animals (stylised Animals.) is an American adult animated comedy television series created by Phil Matarese and Mike Luciano. The first two episodes were independently produced and presented at the Sundance Film Festival in January 2015. In May 2015, HBO picked the series up with a two-season order, which premiered on February 5, 2016. The series was renewed for a third season on May 19, 2017. Season 3 premiered on August 3, 2018. In October 2018, it was announced that HBO had canceled the series.

== Plot ==
Each episode features a different cast of special guests, along with creators Matarese and Luciano playing various animals. The show features retroscripting and improvised dialogue based on plot outlines. Each season also has a story arc featuring humans in live-action sequences (except the first season which is all animated), such as a corrupt mayor and the events leading to his reelection in season one.

In season two, the human story arc concerns a reporter investigating a virus outbreak created by mad scientist Dr. Labcoat, who is forced to release a gas that dissolves all human life in New York.

In season three, which takes place three years after the dubbed "Green Day" incident, the animals of New York have formed their own governments while they are being observed by two soldiers who are losing their grip on reality.

== Cast ==
=== Main ===
- Phil Matarese as himself
  - Humans: Private Matarese
  - Rats: Phil Jr. Also portrayed Phil Jr.'s biological father in the first episode.
  - Pigeons
  - Cats: Emperor Phil, a sociopathic cat who was initially the mayor's cat. Also portrayed Phil, a mafia cat who took over the family business.
  - Dogs
  - Flies
  - Squirrels
  - Roaches
  - Worms
  - Horses
- Mike Luciano as himself
  - Humans: Private Luciano
  - Rats: Mike, Phil Jr's best friend. Also portrayed Phil Jr.'s grandfather in his youth.
  - Pigeons
  - Cats: Emperor Mike, a sociopathic cat who was initially the mayor's cat. Also portrayed Mike, a mafia cat leaving organized crime.
  - Dogs
  - Flies
  - Squirrels
  - Roaches
  - Worms
  - Horses

=== Recurring ===
==== Humans ====
- RuPaul Charles as Dr. Labcoat, the antagonist of season two's human storyline. A scientist of the unscrupulous conglomerate Pesci Co., Labcoat arranged for an epidemic in New York to sell the 'Green Pill' to enslave the populace. But after being exposed, Labcoat ends up destroying himself when he wiped out the human populace of New York. Posthumously, he established the Labcoat terrorists of season three.
- John Early as The Assistant, Dr. Labcoat's aid and accomplice.
- Demi Moore as The General, the antagonist of season three's human storyline.
- Mel Rodriguez as The Lieutenant

==== Animals ====
- Katie Aselton as Rebecca, Mom
- Neil Casey as Principal Lief, a rat principal at the high school Phil Jr. and Mike attended in the first two seasons. He also played the human Executive 3, a Pesci Co. employee that became the founding leader of the Labcoats in season 3 after Dr. Labcoat subjected him to a mutative strain of the Green Pill in season 2, and Reporter.
- Jay Duplass as Dennis
- Lauren Lapkus as Jacob, CO298
- Jon Lovitz as Himself, Old Ben
- Claudia O'Doherty as April
- Mindy Sterling as Psychic Lady
- Kurt Vile as Himself

=== Guest stars ===
- Jhené Aiko as Mary
- Jason Alexander as Algae
- Stephanie Allynne as TO89W
- Eric André as Alex
- Aziz Ansari as Charles
- Scott Aukerman as Drug Dealer
- Awkwafina as Annie
- Bob Balaban as Himself
- Marianne Jean-Baptiste as Giraffe
- Amir Blumenfeld as Caterer 1
- Big Boi as Fox 2
- Alex Borstein as Lois Griffin
- Jessica Chastain as Sarah
- Emilia Clarke as Lumpy
- Brett Davis as Lizard Executive
- Charlie Duncan as Maddie
- Mark Duplass as Ken
- Mary Elizabeth Ellis as Wendy
- Josh Fadem as FDB Representative
- Edie Falco as Psycho
- Nathan Fielder as DJ Lab Rat
- Whoopi Goldberg as Dorothy
- Kim Gordon as Tulip
- Judy Greer as Ali
- David Harbour as Hawk
- Dan Harmon as Ad Man 1
- Jonah Hill as Pesicorp President
- Mary Holland as Ashley, 69-69-420x
- Jake Hurwitz as Caterer 2
- Mitchell Hurwitz as Larry
- Brandon Johnson as Ad Man 3
- Jay Johnston as Ad Man 4
- January Jones as Diana
- Dinosaur Jr. as Themselves as Beavers
- Mindy Kaling as Sandy
- Ellie Kemper as Princess
- Harmony Korine as Corey
- Nick Kroll as Jerry
- James Kyson
- Jennifer Lafleur as Wife
- Donna Lewis as Donna Lewis Rat
- Lucy Liu as Yumi
- Melanie Lynskey as Linda
- Anthony Mackie as Receipt
- Jason Mantzoukas as Fink
- Demetri Martin as Graham
- Marc Maron as Marc Maron Rat
- Tatiana Maslany as Sherman
- Danny McBride as Gregory
- Killer Mike as Fox 1
- Moby as Moby Pig
- Robert Morse as Old Phil
- Kumail Nanjiani as Rusty
- Meghan O'Neill as Meghan, Natalie, Angels
- Gil Ozeri as Chuck
- Adam Pally as Max
- Chelsea Peretti as Angela
- Michael Rapaport as Erik
- Andy Richter as Prisoner
- Justin Roiland as H&M
- Paul Rust as Mason
- Horatio Sanz as Julio
- Ben Schwartz as Antonio, Geoff
- Adam Scott as Shane
- Rory Scovel as Ronnie
- Ty Segall as Himself
- Molly Shannon as Olivia
- Alia Shawkat as Sharon
- Pauly Shore as Pat
- Jenny Slate as Snake
- Cobie Smulders as Anni
- Jessica St. Clair as Kaitlin
- Dino Stamatopoulos as Ad Man 2
- Wanda Sykes as Chance
- Raven Symone as Nurse
- Jacob Tremblay as Nuke
- Usher as Miles
- Marlon Wayans as Ry-Ry
- Shawn Wayans as Tommy
- Joe Wengert as Priest, Baker, Boyfriend
- Erin Whitehead as 49C74
- Casey Wilson as Queen Ant
- John Witherspoon as Jimmy
- Zach Woods as Brian
- Steve Zissis as Husband
- A$AP Ferg as Bodega Cat 1
- A$AP Rocky as Bodega Cat 2
- Nick Hexum as Himself
- SA Martinez as Himself
- Jet Eveleth as Scarf Rat

== Episodes ==
Season	Episodes	Originally released	
Season	Episodes	First released	Last released
Web series	6	August 13, 2012	March 20, 2013
1	10	February 5, 2016	April 8, 2016
2	10	March 17, 2017	May 19, 2017
3	10	August 3, 2018	October 5, 2018

== Critical reception ==
The first season has received positive reviews from critics. As of April 2020, it holds a 68% "Fresh" rating on review aggregator website Rotten Tomatoes, based on 19 reviews, with an average of 6.5/10. On Metacritic, the series holds a rating of 54 out of 100, based on 12 critics, indicating "mixed or above average reviews". Maureen Ryan of Variety gave the first season a negative review, writing, "The animated HBO show has a lot in common with programs like Girls, Louie, and Baskets, and like Togetherness, it boasts Mark and Jay Duplass as executive producers. But the extraordinarily tedious Animals., unlike those shows, fails to hit any of its chosen targets. It is unfunny, its animation is unexceptional and the studied banality of its dialogue is excruciating." Conversely, David Wiegand in the San Francisco Chronicle gave the season a positive review, writing, "The deadpan approach only enhances the delicious off the wall comedy of Animals. The series is batty and brilliant as it turns the whole notion of anthropomorphic cartoon animals on its fuzzy ear."

== See also ==
- HouseBroken, another adult-animated series featuring talking animals.
- Room 104
- Togetherness
- Portlandia, sketches featured talking rats.
