= Rhona Cameron =

Scottish comedian (born 1965)

- Born: 27 September 1965 (age 61); Dundee, Scotland

Comedy career
- Years active: 1992–present
- Website: www.rhonacameron.com

Rhona Cameron (born 27 September 1965) is a Scottish comedian, writer and TV presenter. She rose to prominence via the stand-up comedy circuit, and was a regular on British television in the 1990s.

== Television career ==
In 1992, she won So You Think You're Funny.

In 1993 Cameron presented the late-night music programme TNT, which was aligned with the Los Angeles radio show KROQ.

She presented the ITV game show Russian Roulette and the BBC Two show Gaytime TV. Cameron co-wrote Rhona with her former partner Linda Gibson. Rhona was a sitcom which starred Cameron as Rhona Campbell, a lesbian Scot living alone in London, who has problems similar to those of her straight friends. Only one six-episode series was made, broadcast in July and August 2000 on BBC2.

Cameron was a participant in the first series of I'm a Celebrity...Get Me Out of Here!. She was eliminated 4th on 5 September 2002, placing 5th.

In June 2009, she appeared on Celebrity Wife Swap with her partner, Suran Dickson.

She is the narrator for the Channel 4 series Find It, Fix It, Flog It.

In January 2022, she was announced as one of several comedians on GB News' newspaper preview show Headliners.

== Writing ==
She is the author of Nineteen Seventy-Nine: A Big Year in a Small Town, a book about growing up as a lesbian in the small fishing town of Musselburgh, East Lothian, Scotland, detailing about her teenage years and father's illness.

Her debut novel The Naked Drinking Club was published by Ebury Press in 2007.

== Other performances ==
Cameron appeared as the first female Narrator in some performances of The Rocky Horror Show UK tour 2003. She has also appeared on Lily Savage's Blankety Blank. Since 2015, she has provided the voice of Bonnie in the video game Payday 2.

== Personal life ==
Cameron was born in Dundee and is adopted; her birth mother (whose name Cameron keeps secret) was from North Shields and her biological father is shown as "unknown" on the adoption records. She attended Musselburgh Grammar School.

Cameron previously had relationships with comedian Sue Perkins and with writer Linda Gibson.

== Activism ==
Cameron is a Patron of both LGBT Youth Scotland and Pride London (the UK's largest lesbian, gay, bisexual and transgender Pride event). She has stated that she supports the Scottish National Party and "the case for Independence".
