= Gordon Southern =

British comedian

- Genre: Comedy
- Occupations: Comedian, actor

Gordon Southern is a British comedian. He has performed headlining gigs in The UK, across Europe and all over the world, especially in Australia where he spends several months every year. He has performed several solo shows at the Edinburgh Festival Fringe, Adelaide Fringe and Melbourne Comedy Festival and New Zealand International Comedy Festival.

Shows include: The Longest Year/ Waiting for Gordo (2022 winner of a weekly comedy award at Adelaide Fringe); Nisolation (2021); That Boy Needs Therapy (2019–20) (nominated for best comedy at Perth Fringe World); That's a fun fact! (2017); Adelaide Hills Cop II (2016); Long Story Short (2015); Your New Favourite Comedian (2014) (nominated for best comedy at Perth Fringe World and best international act at New Zealand Comedy Festival), The Kerfuffle (2013–14) (nominated for best show at Perth Fringe); A Brief History of History (2012/13) (nominated for best show at New Zealand Comedy Festival and Edinburgh Fringe Amused Moose Laughter awards); Free Range (2011); Borders (2010); The Unofficial Annual (2009); Stamp Stamp (2007); The Solutions (2006); My Drums Hell (2003); and Gordon Southern (2001).

He has also had several television and radio credits including The Cheese Shop, The 11 O'Clock Show, Stand Up Australia and Good News Week. He appeared on Up Late on ABC and Stand and Deliver on ABC Australia (2016).
