= Vicki Pepperdine =

English comedy actor and writer

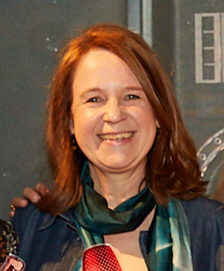
- Vicki Pepperdine in May 2019
- Born: 24 July 1961 (age 65); London, England
- Education: University of East Anglia; East 15 Acting School
- Occupations: Actress, writer
- Years active: 1994–present

Vicki Pepperdine (born 24 July 1961) is an English comedy actress and writer. She co-wrote and starred as Pippa Moore in the BBC sitcom Getting On (2009–2012), for which she was nominated for two BAFTA TV Awards and a British Comedy Award. She is also known for her long-time collaboration with Julia Davis (Nighty Night (2004), Camping (2016), Dear Joan and Jericha (2018–2025)).

== Early life and education ==
Pepperdine was born in London on 24 July 1961.

Pepperdine's parents both worked in the NHS in south-west London (partly inspiring Getting On). Her father lost a leg in the second world war. He worked at Queen Mary's Hospital, Roehampton. Pepperdine has memories of seeing him at work and also being invited to the yearly "The League of Pity Party", where very ill children would attend.

Pepperdine has a sister, Jane.

At school, Pepperdine was interested in music and drama; however, she did not realise a television career was an option.

Pepperdine studied History of Art at the University of East Anglia. There she had two lecturers, a Marxist and a Marxist-Feminist, who opened up new ideas to her. She subsequently worked for Help the Aged and in publishing. She also worked selling advertising space.

Having previously enjoyed but not been confident in her acting abilities, at the age of 27, Pepperdine applied to East 15 Acting School in Debden, Essex because her hero Alison Steadman had studied there. She was accepted for a one-year postgraduate course. Upon graduating, Pepperdine found there were not many parts for her age; as such, she went into writing.

Pepperdine and Melanie Hudson formed the comedy duo Hudson and Pepperdine. They performed at the Edinburgh Fringe together, and were picked up by French and Saunders' agent and a BBC Radio 4 show. In 1999, they appeared on Channel 4's Coming Soon.

== Career ==
=== Television ===
Between 2009 and 2013, Pepperdine co-wrote and starred (as Dr. Pippa Moore) in the BBC Four sitcom Getting On with Jo Brand and Joanna Scanlan. Brand, Scanlan, and Pepperdine won the 2010 Royal Television Society Award for Best Writing in Comedy. In 2010 the three also won the Writers' Guild of Great Britain award for Best Comedy. The show also won the award for Best Sitcom at the British Comedy Awards. For the third series, Brand, Scanlan and Pepperdine were nominated for the 2012 Royal Television Society Award and the BAFTA TV Awards for Best Writing in Comedy. Pepperdine went on to executive Produce and appear (reprising her role as Pippa Moore in the season three episode "Am I Still Me?") in HBO's three-season adaptation of the series.

From 2012-13, Pepperdine played the regular role of midwife Anna Nikolayevna in both series of A Young Doctor's Notebook.

In 2014, Pepperdine co-wrote, co-produced and starred in the improvisational comedy, Puppy Love, again with Scanlan. She played the character Naomi Singh who attends dog training classes run by Scanlan's character Nana V. Pepperdine said that the series is about "why the UK's 7.3 million wonders choose to get a dog "when the reality of mishap, adventure and tribulation is often more than they bargained for"". The Independent described the show as being a "very funny...slow-build, slyly smart" character comedy.

In 2014, Pepperdine played Harry Hill's housekeeper Mrs Flittersnoop in The Incredible Adventures of Professor Branestawm on BBC One.

Pepperdine has regularly collaborated with comedian and writer Julia Davis and credits her as being the "funniest person I know". She starred in series one of Davis' dark comedy Nighty Night (2004) as Mrs. Horner; the Sky Atlantic series Camping (2016) as overbearing mother and wife Fiona; and Belinda, the ineffectual therapist, in the Sky Atlantic sitcom Sally4Ever (2018).

From 2013-2015, Pepperdine played Gwen in Jessica Hynes' Up the Women, a sitcom about women in the Suffragette movement. She wore a pair of false teeth, which she later used for her role as Princess Ann in The Windsors.

Pepperdine is also known for her recurring role of Princess Anne in The Windsors (2016–2023). Fi Glover, on her BBC podcast Fortunately... with Fi and Jane, described Pepperdine's portrayal as "riveting, just riveting". Pepperdine described it as one of "my favourite jobs ever to do, because it's such fun".

In 2017, Pepperdine collaborated with Ellie White on Summer Comedy Shorts: Vicki Pepperdine & Ellie White's Summer for Sky Arts. The film was about a female Morris dancing troupe in the English countryside. Pepperdine played the character of Alison.

In 2018, Pepperdine starred as Harriet in the show Channel 4 series High & Dry. The series is about a group of passengers who become stranded on a desert island after a plane crash. Harriet used to be a Brown Owl, and Pepperdine describes her as "incredibly practical, incredibly strong, very determined, very bossy and a bit of a nightmare for everyone else to be around".

Pepperdine and Joanna Scanlan established a production company together called George & George, with the aim of creating their own material as well as "commission others writing about the female experience". The company is named after George Eliot and George Sand, two women who published under men's names to be taken seriously. In 2019, it was announced that they were working in association with Steeve Coogan's production company Baby Cow on an adaptation of Lissa Evans' Old Baggage, a comic novel about the Women's Suffrage Movement. Pepperdine was set to take the role of The Flea. The series had a first-look deal with BBC Studios. The series was never made.

In 2019 and 2021, Pepperdine played Aunt Sally in BBC One's series Worzel Gummidge, created by MacKenzie Crook based on the books by Barbara Euphan Todd.

=== Radio, podcasting and audiobooks ===
From 2000-2005, Pepperdine, as part of her comedy duo with Melanie Hudson, wrote and starred in BBC Radio 4's The Hudson and Pepperdine Show. The series was a variety comedy show, where they played two people sharing a flat. Other writers on the show included Dave Lamb, Jim North, Danny Robins, Dan Tetsell, Richie Devlin, Rhodri Crooks and Paul Kerensa. The script editor was Graeme Garden. Other cast members included Martin Hyder, Jim North, Dave Lamb and Jessica Martin. The series was nominated for a Sony award. The series has since been released as an audiobook by Penguin. After ten years of working together, the duo went their separate ways.

From 2018-2025, Pepperdine co-wrote and starred as Jericha Domain in the improvised comedy podcast Dear Joan and Jericha alongside regular collaborator Julia Davis. In the podcast, Pepperdine and Davis play two agony aunts, Jericha Doman and Joan Damry (respectively), and they "dish out eye-wateringly unhelpful advice on a weekly basis to spoof listeners’ letters". It was produced by Hush Do, Pepperdine Productions and Dot Dot Dot Productions for Acast. In 2020, Davis and Pepperdine released a book for the project titled Why He Turns Away: Do's And Don'ts, From Dating To Death. It was published by Trapeze (Orion) on 29 October 2020. It consists of new material, not heard on the podcast.

In 2019, Pepperdine was working on a script for a show (The Brotherhood as preliminary title) about a patriarchal society. She was developing this idea with Sian Gibson and Rosie Cavaliero.

In 2020, Pepperdine wrote Always June, a BBC Radio Two pilot, in the hope that it would become a TV show. It was about "a difficult landlady and her difficult tenants". She developed the programme with Morgana Robinson.

Pepperdine is adapting Agatha Christie's The Murder at the Vicarage for Audible.

=== Theatre ===
Pepperdine's theatre work includes the role of Mrs Candour in Deborah Warner's 2011 production of The School for Scandal at the Barbican Centre.

=== Film ===
In 2017, Pepperdine appeared in comedy feature Eaten by Lions alongside Antonio Aakeel and Jack Carroll, directed by Jason Wingard.

== Inspiration ==
Pepperdine has cited her early inspiration as French and Saunders and Wood and Walters. Later, she liked American programmes like Friends, Better Things and Big Little Lies.

== Personal life ==
Pepperdine has two sons.

== Filmography ==
=== Film ===
Year	Title	Role	Director	Notes	Ref
2001	Gypsy Woman	Kate	Sheree Folkson		
2002	Thunderpants	Reporter	Peter Hewitt		
2003	Blackball	Henna Haired PA	Mel Smith		
2016	Here Boy	Sue	Molly Manners	Short film	
2017	My Cousin Rachel	Mrs. Pascoe	Roger Michell		
2017	Goodbye Christopher Robin	Betty	Simon Curtis		
2017	The 31st Floor	Ashley	Tiana Ghosh	Short film	
2017	The Overcoat	The Policewoman	Patrick Myles	Short film	
2018	Johnny English Strikes Again	Lydia	David Kerr		
2019	Eaten by Lions	Ellen	Jason Wingard		
2019	How to Build a Girl	Smart DSS Woman	Coky Giedroyc		
2021	Falling for Figaro	Patricia	Ben Lewin		
2022	We Are Not Alone	Trater	Fergal Costello		
2023	Magic Mike's Last Dance	Edna Eaglebauer	Steven Soderbergh		
2023	Poor Things	Mrs. Prim	Yorgos Lanthimos		
2024	Ideomatic	Kris	Phil Dunster	Short film	
2026	Wuthering Heights	Sister Mercy	Emerald Fennell		
2026	Club Kid	Lydia	Jordan Firstman		
2026	Savage House	Mrs. Bennett	Peter Glanz		
2026	The Way of the Runner	Harriet	Yutong Bai		

=== Television ===
Year	Title	Role	Other Role	Channel	Notes	Ref
1992	Side by Side	Sandra		BBC One	Series 1; episode 5	
1994	The Bill	Michelle Grainger		BBC	Series 10; episode 55: "Killing Time"	
1997	The Bill	Linda Martins		BBC	Series 13; episode 36: "Hook, Line and Sinker"	
1998	The Bill	Mrs. Parker		BBC	Series 14; episode 26: "Guiding Hand"	
1995	The Saturday Night Armistice	Various		BBC Two	Series 1; Episode 4	
1996	The Saturday Night Armistice	Various		BBC Two	Series 2; Episode 3	
1997	Dennis Pennis R.I.P.	Jenny Puss, Business Woman				
1997	Dad	WPC		BBC One	Series 1; episode 5: "Dadaholic"	
1998	Comedy Nation	Various	Writer	BBC Two	Series 1; Episodes 3, 4, 7, 10 (actor); Episodes 3, 7 10 (writer)	
1998	In the Red	Bank Manager 1			Miniseries; episode 2	
1998	Vanity Fair	Ann Dobbin		A&E TV Network	Miniseries; episodes 4 & 5	
1998	The Saturday Night Armistice	Various		BBC Two	Christmas Special: "The Armistice Party Bucket"	
1998	The Saturday Night Armistice	Various		BBC Two	Series 3; Episodes 2 and 3	
1998–1999	How Do You Want Me?	Warren’s Wife			Series 1, Episode 1: "No-One Can Hear You Scream"; Series 2, Episode 2	
1999	Coming Soon	Jen			Television film	
1999	Big Bad World	Mum in Park			Series 1; episode 5: "Happy Nappy"	
1999	People Like Us			BBC	Series 1; episode 2: "The Estate Agent"	
2000	Beast	Briony’s Friend		BBC One	Series 1; Episode 4: "Frightening Shorts"	
2000	Rhona	Ally Elvis		BBC Two	Episodes 1–5	
2000	Chambers	Crimenight Producer		BBC One	Series 1; Episode 2: "Trial By Television"	
2001	Los Dos Bros	Therapist (voice)		Channel 4	Episodes 1–6	
2001	World of Pub	Woman in Pub		BBC Two	Episode 6: "Ladies"	
2001	Station Jim	Nurse		BBC	Television film	
2001	Mr. Charity	Hospice Receptionist		BBC Two	Episode 4: "Helping People to Help Themselves"	
2002	I'm Alan Partridge	Patricia Lessing		BBC Two	Series 2; episode 3: "Bravealan"	
2002	TLC	Chiropodist		BBC Two	Episode 5: "The Wrong Leg"	
2003	Grass	Lucy		BBC Three	Episodes 2, 6 & 8	
2004	Nighty Night	Mrs. Horner		BBC Three	Series 1; Episode 1	
2004	My Family	Martha		BBC One	Series 5; episode 8: "My Fair Charlady"	
2004	Agatha Christie: A Life in Pictures	Carlo Fisher			Television film	
2004	Green Wing	Neighbour		Channel 4	Series 1; episode 9: "Emergency"	
2004–2005	Doc Martin	Mrs. Richards		ITV1	Series 1; episode 2: "Gentlemen Prefer"; Series 2; episode 2: "In Loco"	
2005	Dead Man Weds	Annouska		ITV1	Episode 4	
2005	Two Pints of Lager and a Packet of Crisps	Consultant		BBC Three	Series 5; episode 9: "Stot or Pronk"	
2006	Pinochet in Suburbia	Interviewer			Television film	
2006	Saxondale	Squirrel Woman		BBC Two	Series 1; episode 5: "Squirrels"	
2006	The Only Boy for Me	Mrs. Anderson			Television film	
2006	Lead Balloon	Newsagent		BBC Two	Series 1; episode 2: "Wayne"	
2007	Holby City	Lynn Cassidy		BBC	Series 9; episode 48: "Trial and Retribution"	
2007	Dog Face		Writer	E4	Episodes 1, 2, 3	
2009	No Signal!	Various		FOX	Episode 8	
2009–2012	Getting On	Dr. Pippa Moore	Co-writer	BBC Four	Series 1–3; all 15 episodes	
2010	Life of Riley	Miss Kennedy		BBC One	Series 2; episode 3: "Nine to Five"	
2011	New Tricks	Madeleine Simmonds		ITV	Series 8; episode 1: "Old Fossils"	
2012	Mid Morning Matters with Alan Partridge	Terri Cohen		Sky Atlantic	Series 1; episodes 5, 8, 10 & 11	
2012	Twenty Twelve	Sarah Slocombe		BBC	Series 2; episode 4: "The Rapper"	
2012	Miranda	Eaters Anonymous Group Leader		BBC One/ Two	Series 3; episode 1: "It Was Panning"	
2012–2013	A Young Doctor’s Notebook	Anna		Sky Arts	Series 1 & 2; all 8 episodes	
2013	Chickens	Hesta		Sky One / Channel 4	Episodes 1–4 & 6	
2013, 2015	Up the Women	Gwen		BBC Two	Series 1 & 2; all 9 episodes	
2014	Rev.	Geri Tennison		BBC Two	Series 3; episodes 1 & 5	
2014	Lovesick	Doctor		Channel 4	Series 1; episode 1: "Abigail"	
2014	Puppy Love	Naomi Singh	Co-Writer, Exec Producer (Episode 1)	BBC Four	Episodes 1–6	
2014	The Incredible Adventures of Professor Branestawm	Mrs. Flittersnoop		BBC One	Television film	
2014	Grey Dogs			Sky	Short	
2015	Up the Women	Gwen		BBC Two		
2015	Still Open All Hours	Mrs. Dawlish		BBC One	Series 1; episode 4	
2015	Together	Lesley		BBC Three	Episodes 1–6	
2015	Getting On (American version)	Dr. Pippa Moore	Exec. Producer (Seasons 1-3)	HBO	Season 3; episode 4: "Am I Still Me?"	
2015	Professor Branestawm Returns	Mrs. Flittersnoop		BBC One	Television film	
2016	Camping	Fiona		Sky Atlantic	Miniseries; all 6 episodes	
2016–2023	The Windsors	Princess Anne		Channel 4	Series 1–3; 6 episodes, Christmas Special, Royal Wedding Special, Coronation Special	
2017	Midsomer Murders	Barbara Walton		ITV	Series 19; episode 2: "Crime and Punishment"	
2017	Summer Comedy Shorts: Vicki Pepperdine & Ellie White's Summer	Alison	Writer, Exec. Producer	Sky Arts		
2017–2019	Celebrity Pointless	Self				
2017–2023	Sunday Brunch	Self				
2018	Shakespeare & Hathaway: Private Investigators	Penelope Pincott		BBC One	Series 1; episode 2: "The Chimes at Midnight"	
2018	The Woman in White	Mrs. Michelson		BBC One	Miniseries; episodes 2–4	
2018	High & Dry	Harriet		Channel 4	Episodes 1–6	
2018	Cuckoo	Debbie		BBC Three	Series 4; episode 5: "Walkabout"	
2018	The Reluctant Landlord	Head Teacher		Sky One	Series 1; episodes 1 & 2: "Dirty Harry" & "Pants On Fire"	
2018	Sally4Ever	Belinda		Sky Atlantic	Episodes 3, 5 & 6	
2018	Saluting Dad's Army	Self		U&Gold	Episodes 2 and 4	
2019	Imagine... Jo Brand: No Holds Barred	Self		BBC One		
2019	Wild Bill	Broadbent			Miniseries; episodes 1, 4 & 6	
2019	Defending the Guilty	Beth		BBC Two	Episode 3	
2019, 2021	Worzel Gummidge	Aunt Sally		BBC One	Series 1; episode 1, & series 2; episodes 1 & 3	
2020	The Trouble with Maggie Cole	Karen Saxton		ITV	Episodes 1–6	
2020, 2022	We Hunt Together	DSI Susan Smart (Susan Watts)		BBC	Series 1 & 2; all 12 episodes	
2021	Dinosaur	Diana		BBC Three	Pilot	
2022	Murder, They Hope	Sandra		U&Gold	Series 2; episode 1: "Can't See the Blood for the Trees"	
2022	We Are Not Alone	Trater		U&Dave	1 Episode	
2022–2024	Bad Education	Ms Bernadette Hoburn		BBC Three	Series 4 & 5; 14 episodes and Reunion	
2023	A Small Light	Gerdi Lange			Miniseries; episode 2: "Welcome to Switzerland"	
2023	The Madame Blanc Mysteries	Lydia			Series 3; episode: "Christmas Special"	
2024	The Cleaner	Caroline		BBC One	Series 3; episode 2: "The Baby"	
2025	Death Valley	Anne Treadway		BBC One	Episode 2	
2025	Danielle Does Life	Ginger Jane		BBC Three		
2026	Dirty Business	Lucy Hunt		Channel 4		
2026	It Gets Worse	Sarah (Ethan's Mum)		Channel 4		

=== Online ===
Year	Title	Role	Platform	Notes	Ref
2017	The Educatoror	Liz Church	Channel 4	Miniseries; all 3 episodes: "Amstedad", "Brown Privilege" & "Poster Boy"	
2019	The Temp	Aimee	Audible	Episodes 1-6	
2021	Raj!	Dr Cecilia	Audible	Episode 5: "My Kingdom For A Leg"	

== Radiography and audiography ==
=== Radio ===
Year	Title	Role	Other Role	Channel	Notes	Ref
1996	The Sunday Format	Ensemble Actor	Writer	BBC Radio 4	Pilot: "Thrilled to Death"	
2000	The Sunday Format	Ensemble Actor	Writer	BBC Radio 4	Series 2; Episodes 2, 5, 6 (actor); episodes 1, 4, 5 (writer)	
2001	The Sunday Format	Ensemble Actor	Writer	BBC Radio 4	Series 3; Episode 3, 4 (actor); episode 1 (writer)	
2000–2005	The Hudson And Pepperdine Show	Host	Writer	BBC Radio 4	4 Series	
2000	Married	The Woman on the Train		BBC Radio 4	Series 2, Episode 6: "War of the Worlds"	
2001	Parsons And Naylor's Pull-Out Sections	Self		BBC Radio 4	Series 2; Episode 2	
2003–2004	Artists	Tamsin		BBC Radio 4	Series 1, 2	
2004	It's That Jo Caulfield Again	Ensemble Actor		BBC Radio 4	Series 1; Episodes 1-4	
2004	15 Minute Musical	Various		BBC Radio 4	Series 1; Episodes 2, 3, 5	
2005	15 Minute Musical	Various		BBC Radio 4	Series 2; Episodes 1, 3, 4	
2006	15 Minute Musical	Various		BBC Radio 4	Series 4; Episodes 1, 2, 4	
2007	15 Minute Musical	Various		BBC Radio 4	Series 4; Episodes 3, 4, 5	
2008	15 Minute Musical	Various		BBC Radio 4	Series 5; Episodes 1, 5	
2005	Ed Reardon's Week	Ensemble Actor		BBC Radio 4	Series 1; Episodes 2, 3, 6	
2013	Ed Reardon's Week	Laura Pope		BBC Radio 4	Series 9; Episode 6	
2015	Ed Reardon's Week	Laura Pope		BBC Radio 4	Series 10; Episode 1	
2017	Ed Reardon's Week	Nikki		BBC Radio 4	Series 12; Episodes 2, 4	
2005	Giles Wemmbley Hogg Goes Off	Liz		BBC Radio 4	Series 3; Episode 5: "Haiti"	
2005	Clare in the Community	Sally		BBC Radio 4	Series 2; Episode 1: "Past Caring"	
2005	Clare in the Community	Rosie		BBC Radio 4	Series 2; Episode 6: "Doolah's Choice"	
2006	28 Acts In 28 Minutes	Guest		BBC Radio 4	Series 1; Episode 1	
2008	Hudson And Pepperdine Save The Planet	Vicki		BBC Radio 4	1 Episode	
2009	The News At Bedtime	Ensemble Actor		BBC Radio 4	Episodes 1-7; Special: "Review of the Year"	
2010	The Music Teacher	Belinda		BBC Radio 4	Series 1; Episodes 1-6	
2012	The Music Teacher	Belinda		BBC Radio 4	Series 2; Episodes 3, 4, 6	
2013	The Music Teacher	Belinda		BBC Radio 4	Series 3; Episode 1	
2010	I Got The Dog	Narrator		BBC Radio 4	Episode 3: "Chiara's Story"	
2010	What Went Wrong With The Olympics?	Caroline Grant		BBC Radio 4	Episodes 1-4	
2010	Les Kelly's Britain	Ensemble Actor		BBC Radio 4	Pilot	
2011	Brian Gulliver's Travels	Mollsen		BBC Radio 4	Series 1; Episode 5: "Erosia"	
2012	Brian Gulliver's Travels	Darker		BBC Radio 4	Series 2; Episode 4: "Anidara"	
2011	Beauty Of Britain	Olivia, PhD Student		BBC Radio 4	Series 2; Episode 5: "Mission Command"	
2011	Hard To Tell	Lesley		BBC Radio 4	Series 1; Episodes 1, 2	
2012	Hard To Tell	Lesley		BBC Radio 4	Series 2; Episodes 1-4	
2012	My First Planet	Lillian		BBC Radio 4	Series 1; Episodes 1, 2, 3, 4	
2014	My First Planet	Lillian		BBC Radio 4	Series 2; Episodes 1-6	
2013	The News Quiz	Guest		BBC Radio 4	Series 81; Episode 4	
2016	The News Quiz	Guest		BBC Radio 4	Series 89; Episodes 3, 7; Series 91; Episode 8	
2017	The News Quiz	Guest		BBC Radio 4	Series 92; Episode 4	
2018	The News Quiz	Guest		BBC Radio 4	Series 95; Episodes 5, 8; Series 96; Episode 7	
2014	Jeremy Hardy Speaks To The Nation	Guest		BBC Radio 4	Series 10; Episode 1: "How To Eat Food"	
2015	Couples	Dr Tanya Ray-Harding		BBC Radio 4	Pilot	
2016	Couples	Dr Tanya Ray-Harding		BBC Radio 4	Series 1; Episodes 1-3	
2016	The Unbelievable Truth	Guest		BBC Radio 4	Series 17; Episodes 3, 4	
2017	Little Lifetimes: The Last Day			BBC Radio 4	1 Episode	
2018	All Those Women	Nerys		BBC Radio 4	Series 3; Episode 1	
2018	Boswell's Lives	Agatha Christie		BBC Radio 4	Series 3; Episode 3: "Boswell's Life of Christie"	
2020	Always June	June Pursglove	Writer	BBC Radio 2		
2020	Now Wash Your Hands	Jericha Domain		BBC Radio 4	Episode 6	
2020	ReincarNathan	Debbie		BBC Radio 4	Series 2; Episode 1: "Cat"	
2020	The Wilsons Save The World	Jennifer		BBC Radio 4	Series 3; Episodes 1, 4	
2021	I'm Sorry I Haven't A Clue	Guest		BBC Radio 4	Series 74; Series 75; Episodes 1, 2	
2022	I'm Sorry I Haven't A Clue	Guest		BBC Radio 4	Series 76; Episodes 5, 6	
2023	I'm Sorry I Haven't A Clue	Guest		BBC Radio 4	Series 78	
2024	I'm Sorry I Haven't A Clue	Guest		BBC Radio 4	Series 80	
2022	50 Years Without A Clue	Self (archive)		BBC Radio 4		
2022	'Whatever Next?' With Miles Jupp	Various		BBC Radio 4	Episodes 1-4	
2025	Icklewick FM	Ensemble Actor		BBC Radio 4	Series 2; Episode 6: "The Barricade"	

=== Podcasts ===
Year	Title	Role	Notes	Ref
2018–2025	Dear Joan and Jericha	Jeircha		

Pepperdine has also featured on other podcasts, including:

- 2018 – Fortunately... with Fi and Jane, Episode 65: "Fields of chaff with Vicki Pepperdine"
- 2019 – The Fear with Sarah Morgan, Season 4, Episode 10
- 2019 – Woman's Hour

=== Audiobooks ===
Year	Title	Role	Production	Notes	Ref
2026	The Murder at the Vicarage	Mrs. Price-Ridley	Audible	Also writer	

== Theatre ==
Year	Title	Role	Theatre	Company	Ref
1990	The Care Takers	Ensemble	UK Tour	Remould Theatre Company	
1991	Bedroom Farce	Kate	Redgrave Theatre, Farnham	Farnham Repertory Company	
1991	Cider With Rosie	Marge / Miss Wardley / Mrs Davies / Rosie	Bristol Hippodrome, Birmingham Repertory Theatre, and other locations.	Birmingham Repertory Company	
1992	The Winter's Tale			Théâtre de Complicité	
1993	The Day After Tomorrow	Alice		Royal National Theatre	
1994	Peter Pan	Tiger Lily / Liza the maid	Birmingham Repertory Theatre	Birmingham Repertory Company	
1994	The Atheist's Tragedy		Birmingham Rep		
1995	Nothing Compares to You	Fylgia of Joy / Fylgia of Mary	The Studio, Birmingham Repertory Theatre		
1995	Cause Celebre		Lyric Theatre		
1995	Edward II	Queen Isabella	Leicester Haymarket		
	Punishment Without Revenge		Gate Theatre		
	Beauty & the Beast		Young Vic		
	A Small Family Business		Chichester Festival Theatre		
2009	Amongst Friends	Shelley	Hampstead Theatre		
2011	School for Scandal	Lady Candour	Barbican Theatre		
