= Up the Women =

British TV sitcom (BBC Four, 2013–15)

- Title card
- Genre: Comedy
- Created by: Jessica Hynes
- Written by: Jessica Hynes
- Directed by: Christine Gernon
- Starring: Jessica Hynes; Rebecca Front; Vicki Pepperdine; Judy Parfitt; Emma Pierson; Adrian Scarborough; Georgia Groome; Ryan Sampson
- Opening theme: "Nana Was a Suffragette"
- Country of origin: United Kingdom
- Original language: English
- No. of series: 2
- No. of episodes: 9

Production
- Executive producers: Mark Freeland; Henry Normal; Lindsay Hughes
- Producer: Emma Strain
- Running time: 30 minutes
- Production companies: BBC; Baby Cow Productions

Original release
- Network: BBC Four
- Release: 30 May 2013 – 25 February 2015

Up the Women is a BBC television sitcom created, written by and starring Jessica Hynes. It was first broadcast on BBC Four on 30 May 2013. The sitcom is about a group of women in 1910 who form a Women's Suffrage movement. Hynes originally planned to write a comedy film about a suffragette plot to assassinate H. H. Asquith, but after realising the plot had turned quite dark, she decided to write a sitcom instead. Christine Gernon directed the three-part series, which became the last sitcom to be filmed before a live audience at BBC Television Centre and the first to be commissioned for BBC Four. A second series was commissioned in June 2013 and aired on BBC Two from 21 January 2015. Up the Women was not renewed for a third series.

== Premise ==
The sitcom is set in 1910 and focuses on the women of the Banbury Intricate Craft Circle and their level of commitment to the women's suffrage movement. Having seen the Women's suffrage movement in London, Margaret (Jessica Hynes) returns to Banbury and asks the ladies of her local craft circle to support the cause. The group start up their own suffrage league called Banbury Intricate Craft Circle Politely Requests Women's Suffrage (BICCPRWS), but the league faces opposition from Helen (Rebecca Front).

== Production ==
=== Conception ===
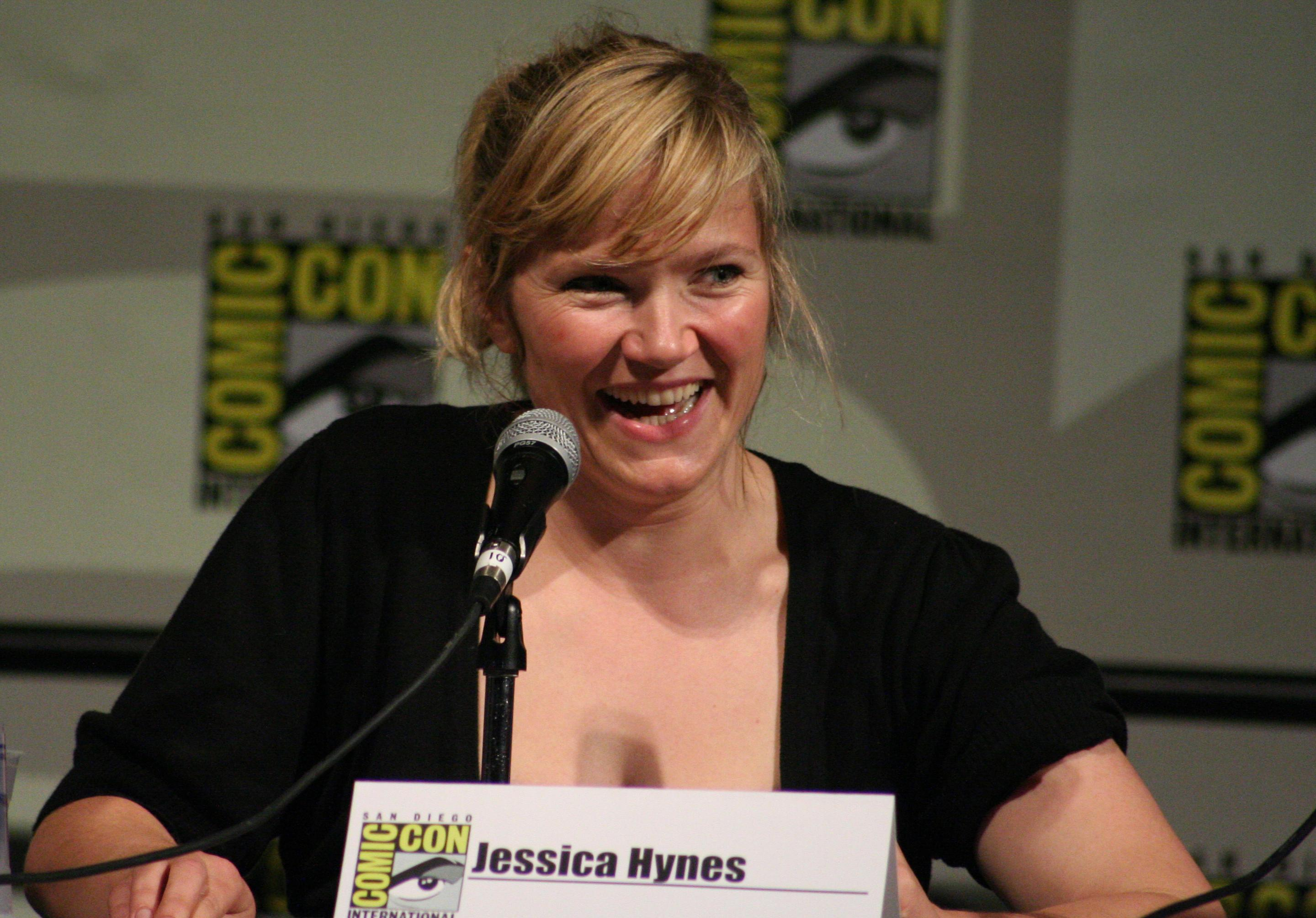
Jessica Hynes created, wrote and stars in Up the Women.

In February 2013, the BBC announced that Richard Klein and Shane Allen had commissioned the three-part comedy Up the Women, which was created and written by Jessica Hynes. Up the Women was the first sitcom filmed in front of a live audience to be commissioned for BBC Four. Andrew Williams from the Metro revealed that should the pilot series of Up the Women do well, then there would be a possible re-commission, which would see where the character's stories go.

Hynes came up with the idea for Up the Women in 2009 after she read a piece about a suffragette plot to assassinate former Prime Minister H. H. Asquith. Hynes thought it would make a good comedy film and sold that idea to the BBC. However, when she came to research it, she realised that the plot was quite dark and felt that she had written "a probably quite dull, tediously worthy drama", which the BBC passed on.

Hynes found that she could not let go of the characters she had created and thought the BBC might want a comedy instead. In 2011, Hynes wrote a new treatment, which focused on her characters and their craft circle in a Banbury church hall. She said "I thought, it would work if you went really retro with it, to make it much easier to relate to these women, who are warm, who are failing. Comedy only really works if you are failing. I made it deliberately restrictive, a church hall and a kitchen, nowhere to go to, nowhere to run and nowhere to hide. I just loved that."

On 31 May 2013, Hynes revealed that Up the Women had been picked up for a full series of six episodes. This was confirmed by the BBC on 12 June. Series two was broadcast on BBC Two and controller of the channel, Janice Hadlow, stated "I'm delighted to welcome the Banbury Intricate Craft Circle to BBC Two. With brilliant writing from Jessica Hynes and a fabulous cast including Rebecca Front, Judy Parfitt and Adrian Scarborough, Up The Women is a wonderful addition to comedy on the channel." The series began airing from 21 January 2015.

On 31 March 2015, the BBC confirmed that they would not be renewing Up the Women for a third series. A spokesperson for BBC2 commented, "After two great series, sadly there won't be any more Up the Women on BBC2 as the channel looks to bring new comedy shows through."

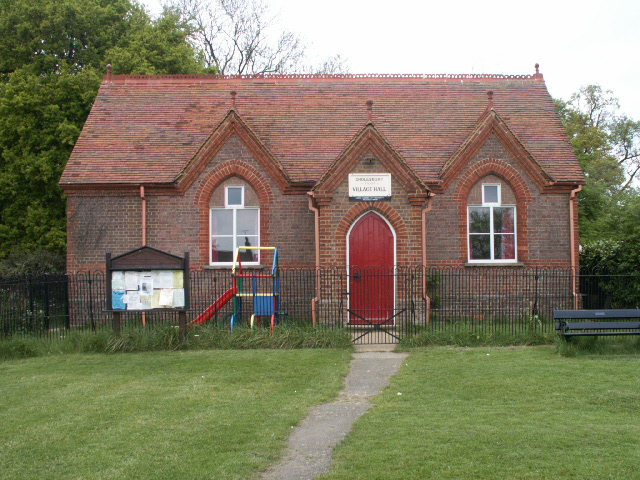
Cholesbury Village Hall

=== Filming ===
Christine Gernon directed the series, which was set in two locations; a church hall and the kitchen. Hynes wanted the show to have "a deliberately retro-sitcom feel" and explained that writing and filming a show set in a studio was unlike anything she had previously done. The first series was recorded on 3, 10 and 17 March 2013 in Studio 3 (TC3) at BBC Television Centre. Up the Women was the last sitcom to be filmed before a live audience at BBC Television Centre. The Village Hall in Cholesbury, Buckinghamshire was used for the external view of the Hall shown at the start of each episode, and the dimensions and layout of the main room of the Village Hall are reflected in the show set.

=== Cast and characters ===
Hynes plays "bright-but-stifled matron" Margaret. The actress told Vicki Power from the Daily Express that her character was inspired by Christabel Pankhurst. Comedian Rebecca Front portrays the group's president and antagonist Helen. Judy Parfitt stars as Helen's mother, Myrtle. Vicki Pepperdine is Gwen, a spinster, while Emma Pierson is Eva, a mother of fourteen. Adrian Scarborough appears as the church hall caretaker Mr Miller. Georgia Groome and Ryan Sampson also appear as Emily and Thomas. Sandi Toksvig appeared in the third episode as Emmeline Pankhurst.

=== Theme music ===
During the titles the song "Nana Was a Suffragette" is played. It was written and performed by Jules Gibb.

== Episodes ==
=== Series 1 (2013) ===
No.	Title	Directed by	Written by	Original release date	UK viewers (millions)
1	"Up the Women"	Christine Gernon	Jessica Hynes	30 May 2013	0.390
Margaret returns from London, where she has witnessed the Women's suffrage movement first hand, and asks the ladies of the Banbury Intricate Craft Circle to support the cause and begin their own suffrage league. However, Margaret's idea receives opposition from Helen, who decides to set up an anti-suffrage league. Additional Material: Barunka O'Shaughnessy, Dan Swimer, Adam Kay, Fraser Steele
2	"Picket"	Christine Gernon	Jessica Hynes	6 June 2013	0.366
The Banbury Intricate Craft Circle Politely Requests Women's Suffrage league create placards for their planned picket outside the Post Office. When the statue of Venus in the library is vandalised, seemingly by a group of Suffragettes, PC John Thackery is sent to investigate and interview the members of the Craft Circle. Additional Material: Barunka O'Shaughnessy, Dan Swimer, Adam Kay
3	"The Poem"	Christine Gernon	Jessica Hynes	13 June 2013	TBA
Emmeline Pankhurst comes to visit the Craft Circle, after Margaret writes her a letter and a poem, with a view to inducting the group into the league of the Women's Social and Political Union. Emmeline's visit brings back bad memories for Helen, who has a rivalry with the suffragette leader. Additional Material: Barunka O'Shaughnessy, Dan Swimer, Adam Kay

=== Series 2 (2015) ===
No.	Title	Directed by	Written by	Original release date	UK viewers (millions)
4	"The Romance"	Christine Gernon	Jessica Hynes, Barunka O'Shaughnessy and Morwenna Banks	21 January 2015	1.50
The members of BICCPRWS attempt a hunger strike, but struggle to uphold it when Gwen brings cheese to a meeting. Helen plans for Emily to be married to Bertie Smuth (Tom Stourton), prompting Thomas to try and tell her how he feels. Myrtle realises Bertie is gay and encourages him to leave for a Sicilian island where homosexuality is welcomed.
5	"Strike"	Christine Gernon	Jessica Hynes, Barunka O'Shaughnessy and Morwenna Banks	28 January 2015	0.870 (overnight)
When the female workers from Helen's factory go on strike, Margaret tries to convince them to join the BICCPRWS. She plans a speech about the cause, but no one turns up. Emily secretly joins the striking women, while Gwen struggles with the various tasks given to her. Eva and Myrtle share a bottle of Dr Hamm's Invigorator, which promises to make the drinker feel better. After drinking the invigorator, Gwen gives a rousing speech about how badly she is treated by the others.
6	"Bowls"	Christine Gernon	Jessica Hynes, Barunka O'Shaughnessy and Morwenna Banks	4 February 2015	0.812 (overnight)
Inspired by mountaineer Annie Smith Peck, Margaret decides to create a pamphlet about women's exclusion from sport. She purchases a camera to take photographs of the ladies with sporting equipment, but struggles to work it. When an international bowls match is moved to the village hall, the suffragettes refuse to leave and meet New Zealand bowlers Hilary (Jarred Christmas) and Leslie (Bruce Mackinnon), who inform them that in their country women can vote and play sports.
7	"Train"	Christine Gernon	Jessica Hynes, Barunka O'Shaughnessy and Morwenna Banks	11 February 2015	0.810 (overnight)
Margaret and her friends are planning to go to London to meet the notorious anti-suffragist Sir Bismuth Albemarle. However, the train station is closed to women after an attempt to attack Winston Churchill with an exploding pie by the Banbury Free Suffrage Army. Although their trip seems thwarted, Gwen arrives in male disguise and they follow her lead. Getting onto a train, they meet Eva and Helen's husbands and Winston Churchill himself (Harry Peacock).
8	"Vote"	Christine Gernon	Jessica Hynes, Barunka O'Shaughnessy and Morwenna Banks	18 February 2015	TBA
The village hall is turned into a polling station for the general election. The women are taken hostage by renegade suffragette Betty (Rebekah Staton), who locks them in the hall. When Officer Thackeray (Dominic Coleman) threatens to arrest them all, Helen wrestles the key away from Betty and opens the door. Eva gives birth to a daughter in the polling booth.
9	"Panto"	Christine Gernon	Jessica Hynes, Barunka O'Shaughnessy and Morwenna Banks	25 February 2015	0.460 (overnight)
The BICCPRWS are planning to stage a pantomime written by Margaret, but she reveals that she burnt her script following criticism from her husband, Osbert (Paul Putner). Eva announces she has a script and the women agree to perform it, even though Margaret points out that it is plagiarised from Cinderella. Margaret decides to stage her own improvised play. After learning several suffragettes were injured during a protest, the women reconcile and perform their plays to applause led by Osbert.

== Reception ==
Jane Simon from the Daily Mirror commented "This is gentle, ever-so-slightly earnest comedy. The fact that it's played more or less dead straight, rather than being a knockabout gag-fest, means it might struggle to find an audience. But it's all the more impressive for its approach." The South Wales Evening Post's Kathy Griffiths chose the first episode of Up the Women as her TV highlight of the week. She quipped that the episode contains some good lines and hinted at becoming better in future episodes. Referring to the placement of Up the Women in the schedules Griffths said "And far better a smaller debut and potential to grow a following on BBC4 than a big trumpeted arrival on mainstream station only to be greeted by dismay and criticism, that poor Vicious has faced." Rachel Aroesti from The Guardian called the third episode "the best" of the first series.

Up the Women was shortlisted for the Best TV Situation Comedy accolade at the 2014 Writers' Guild of Great Britain Awards.

== Home media ==
Series 1 and 2 were released together on DVD on 2 March 2015.
