= Fat (film) =

2013 American drama film

- Directed by: Mark Phinney
- Written by: Mark Phinney
- Produced by: Mark Phinney, P.H. O'Brien, Tim Baker, Mel Rodriguez
- Starring: Mel Rodriguez, Ashley Lauren
- Cinematography: P.H. O'Brien
- Edited by: Michael Gill, Bruce Green
- Production company: Kreate Films
- Distributed by: Syndicado
- Release date: September 8, 2013 (Toronto International Film Festival)
- Running time: 91 minutes
- Country: United States
- Language: English

Fat is a 2013 American drama film directed by Mark Phinney filmed in Boston, MA. It also showcases the Boston music scene prominently on its soundtrack and music plays a major driving role in the film. It had its world premiere on September 8, 2013 at the Toronto International Film Festival and stars Mel Rodriguez as Ken, a food-addicted man struggling with getting his life in order.

The film was released in select theaters and via video on demand platforms on December 15, 2015.

== Synopsis ==
Ken won't change his ways. Addicted to food, Ken is in bad health, and is headed to an early grave. Despite getting help and advice from his friends and doctors, he does what he wants, when he wants; until a chance encounter with love that might just give him the motivation he needs to save himself."

== Cast ==
- Mel Rodriguez as Ken
- Ashley Lauren as Audrey
- Jason Dugre as Terry
- Charlene Amoia as Jill
- Ellen Soderberg as Emma
- David Mirabella as Dave
- Kevin Patey as Billy
- Troy Schueler as Troy
- Lauren Recchia as Laura
- Sophia Cacciola as Gena
- Norm Laviolette as Dean
- Raina Milanowski as Ally
- Bristol Pomeroy as Aaron
- Joanne Verbos as Melanie
- Brett Milanowski as Brett
- Andrew Darrigo as Dr. Moyer

== Reception ==
Critical reception for Fat has been predominantly positive with a 60% fresh score on Rotten Tomatoes. The film has been particularly praised for its gritty, realistic look at food addiction. In its October 30, 2015 issue, The Globe and Mail said, "The story, inspired by the writer-comedian and first-time director Mark Phinney's own life, is told in pseudo-documentary style. A dark film about shame and self-sabotage, Fat is not a pretty picture. The truthful ones rarely are." James Verniere of The Boston Herald gave the film an A−, noting, "What writer/director Mark Phinney’s semi-autobiographical fiction film 'Fat' lacks in subtlety, it makes up for in brutal honesty, insight and genuine rage."

Matt Goldberg of Collider gave the film a more mixed review and a B− grade, but also noted its realistic depiction of the topic: "Fat still manages to hold together long enough to keep its emotional impact intact, and it serves as a cautionary tale without ever feeling preachy. It can disgust, depress, and frustrate, but it doesn’t patronize its audience. Phinney’s film isn’t designed to be motivational but observational. The distance provided by the documentary style makes the strong performances come to us. It’s only when the plot forces a maudlin conclusion that Fat can only mirror the pain of obesity by (to borrow a lyric from Nirvana) taking comfort in being sad."
