= Horrible Histories: Gory Games =

British children's game show

- Genre: Children's game show
- Presented by: Dave Lamb
- Country of origin: United Kingdom
- Original language: English
- No. of series: 5
- No. of episodes: 66

Production
- Running time: 25 minutes
- Production companies: Citrus Television and Lion Television

Original release
- Network: CBBC
- Release: 30 May 2011 – 26 January 2018

Related
- Horrible Histories (2009); Horrible Histories (2015)

Horrible Histories: Gory Games is a children's game show, co-produced by Citrus Television and Lion Television for CBBC, that debuted in 2011. It is a spin-off of hit children's sketch comedy Horrible Histories and is a product of the same creative team.

== History ==
The show featured music by Matt Katz and Richie Webb, produced at Noisegate. The gameshow's participants are aged between 8 and 12.

The gameshow was adapted into an iOS/Android app, allowing players to play along with the contestants. It was available at Google Play or the Apple App Store. The creative team SyncScreen was in charge of app design and user experience, and they used their proprietary SyncScreen Framework API technology. The app also used Civolution's SyncNow Automatic Content Recognition, which increased the synchronicity of the experience. It was the "first mainstream "second screen" apps for kids", and was designed to be used by children while they were watching the show.

The app was launched in 2014 when Series 3 (2013) was re-edited under the new format. Series 1 (2011) went the same way in 2016. New episodes were made under the play-along format in Series 4 (2016), but by Series 5 (2018) the app had been removed from the App Store. After Series 5 (2018) completed broadcast, Series 4 (2016) shown again, but was re-edited to remove the play-along function.

== Gameplay ==
Gory Games is co-hosted by comedian Dave Lamb and Rattus Rattus, the rat puppet who also "hosts" the parent series. The show revolves around "horrible facts". Gameplay involves three child contestants (called "Horrible Historians") trying to obtain "Year Spheres" by completing either a historically themed physical challenge or a quiz. Each Year Sphere contains a year which is either A.D. or B.C. If it is A.D., the year is added to the player's score at the end of the show; if B.C., it is subtracted from it. The player with the highest overall score after three rounds is the winner.

The games are divided into six categories: "Brainy", "Messy", "Scary", "Silly", "Gory" and "Death" (hosted by Death himself). Quiz questions manifest as either multiple-choice or true-or-false questions and may be asked either by Dave, Rattus, a live-action or animated character from that period, or—in Series 3—Death. "Prop questions" are also asked.

Similarly to its parent series, the games are grouped under randomly selected historical eras or civilizations based on Terry Deary's original books.

As from series 3, at the end of the show, the two runners up ended up having to go home through the Time Sewer which was a slide leading to a tank of thick brown gunge.

Cast members from the parent show make frequent cameo appearances as the historical questioners, as does Horrible Histories author Terry Deary.

== Reception ==
Julia Raeside of The Guardian commented that the show has "no bleepy, flashy nonsense", and added that it "would have enthralled 20 years ago and is all the better for it."

The Guardian deemed the Gory Games TV play-along app the 25th best app for kids for 2014, calling it impressive that the technology that allows at-home children to play along with contestants in real-time also works with repeats.

== Awards and nominations ==
In 2013, the show was nominated for a Children's BAFTA award in the category of Entertainment.

== Transmissions ==
Series	Start date	End date	Episodes
1	30 May 2011	2 August 2011	13
2	15 April 2012	8 July 2012	13
3	27 May 2013	6 August 2013	15
4	6 June 2016	24 June 2016	15
5	15 January 2018	26 January 2018	10
