= The Cheese Shop =

British comedy writing and performing team

The Cheese Shop were a troupe of comedy writer-performers from the revue circuit of University of Warwick. Its founding members went on to find success as actors and comedians.

Between 1997 and 1999, Gerard Foster, Dave Lamb, Gordon Southern, Tim Verrinder, Ben Ward and Richie Webb appeared in three series of their comedy sketch show The Cheese Shop Presents: The Butter Factor on BBC Radio 4.

This show featured a number of sketches based around eccentric and outrageous characters, including drug-addicted and sexually deviant singer-songwriter Ted Ruby, maniac gardener Jack Finsborough, petty official Miles Stoat and an unnamed but inexperienced vet ("'Tortoise', you say? Hmm... I must write that down...")

The third series included a regular section called "Fellah's Hour" this was expanded in a fourth series of The Cheese Shop renamed "Fellah's Hour" but still written and performed by the same 6 writer performers and featuring many of the same characters.

Ben Ward, Gerard Foster and Richie Webb also took part in the Saturday morning children's TV programme Live & Kicking, as Men in Trousers, a parody based on the 1997 film Men in Black, where they all shared the same pair of trousers.

== Cast ==
- Dave Lamb went on to contribute to Asian comedy show Goodness Gracious Me and is a prolific comedy actor. He is the narrator for Come Dine with Me.
- Ben Ward wrote the remake of The Basil Brush Show, SMTV Live, The Big Breakfast and the award-winning Disney series called Bus Life for which he was nominated as best Original Writer at the 2004 Children's BAFTAs.
- Gerard Foster went on to write and star in a very successful Radio 4 sitcom called "At Home with the Snails"; he also wrote Young Dracula and My Parents Are Aliens.
- Tim Verrinder is now a television director specialising in live television and events including music, comedy and entertainment.
- Gordon Southern is a stand-up comedian.
- Richie Webb writes and performs extensively on Radio 4 and is a prolific composer of music for TV
