= Dear Joan and Jericha =

Satirical podcast by Julia Davis and Vicki Pepperdine

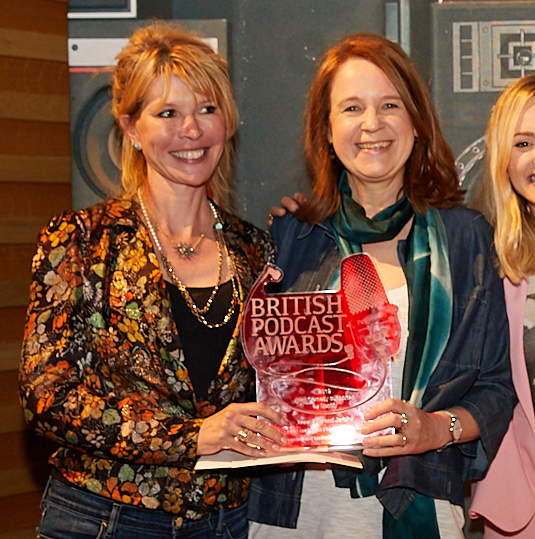
- Davis and Pepperdine at the British Podcast Awards 2019
- Genre: Comedy
- Language: English

Creative team
- Written by: Julia Davis; Vicki Pepperdine

Cast and voices
- Hosted by: Julia Davis; Vicki Pepperdine

Production
- Production: Hush Ho; Pepperdine Productions; Dot Dot Dot

Publication
- No. of episodes: 29
- Original release: 2018 – 2025
- Provider: Acast

Related
- Website: https://dearjoanandjericha.com/

Dear Joan and Jericha is a satirical comedy podcast created by and starring Julia Davis and Vicki Pepperdine. It started in 2018, and released 29 episodes as of March 2026.

== Premise ==
In the podcast, Joan Damry (Julia Davis) and Jericha Domain (Vicki Pepperdine) play "the world’s least sympathetic, most judgmental agony aunts", who answer questions on sex, relationships and medical problems, supposedly sent in by listeners. The answers the two agony aunts give usually comes down to defending men, and blaming women for the issues they face.

== Characters ==
The women met when Jericha was wild swimming in the Regent's Canal and fell into difficulty when she swallowed a super-plus tampon. Joan saved Jericha by using barbecue tongs to pull the tampon out, and they have been friends since.

Both have backgrounds in "the fields of life coaching, female sexual health, psycho-genital counselling and sports journalism”. Jericha has written five books on depression and another on her experience of swimming. Joan has started writing erotic-romantic adult fiction and is a TED-talk speaker.

Both Joan and Jericha have their own experiences of marital issues. Joan, who is mother to five boys sent away to a religious boarding school as soon as possible, has lost three of her six husbands to suicide, and her current husband, Ralph, is in a coma. Jericha's husband, Philip, is usually away looking after boy scouts in Thailand, and her daughter (Cardinal) is described as a "walking syndrome". Jericha previously had a husband, Randy, who she married aged 16, but found him dead, aged 71, a few months after their wedding having suffocated with a pillow taped to his face.

== Writing ==
Davis and Pepperdine recorded the podcasts unscripted, and entirely improvised. The only thing that is prepared are the letters, which Davis and Pepperdine compose separately "to try and shock and surprise the other one". This is then edited for the broadcast version. It is recorded in Davis' kitchen.

Pepperdine has said that the podcast is based on the retrogressive advice offered by agony aunts. However, whilst in some ways the podcast aims to take these attitudes down, Davis said that it is also about "giving a voice to those attitudes that are definitely still very present". It also highlights the internalised misogyny women can face. As the Stylist says, the podcast "is like seeing real-world attitudes towards women reflected in a circus hall of mirrors: warped and outsized, but still absolutely recognisable."

Several sources have likened the characters of Joan and Jericha to the Derek and Clive, the alter-egos of comics Peter Cook and Dudley Moore in the 1970s. Davis has said Derek and Clive, and Peter Cook are her radio heroes. Pepperdine is also a fan of My Dad Wrote a Porno, which Joan and Jericha were guests on.

It has been said that the podcast is based on local radio, but this has been denied by Pepperdine, who said (in jest) that this is "fake news".

== History ==
Davis and Pepperdine had previously worked together on Davis' comedy series: Camping (2016), Hunderby (2012, 2015) and Sally4Ever (2018). The podcast emerged when Davis and Pepperdine "were just playing around with ideas" and "didn't want anyone to tell us what to do, which is what happens in TV."

They have no particular agenda for the podcast, or even an idea that they were making a podcast, and just sat down in Davis' kitchen to record themselves in character uncensored. They met Joel Porter, an editor, who helped them put the podcast together.

The podcast was launched in 2018. It is hosted by Acast. The show was produced by Joel Porter. The first series consisted of eight 20-minute episodes.

The second series launched on 3 October 2019.

=== Book ===
In 2020, Davis and Pepperdine released a book for the project titled Why He Turns Away: Do's And Don'ts, From Dating To Death. It was published by Trapeze (Orion) on 29 October 2020. It consists of new material, not heard on the podcast.

Davis described the book as being about "how to find a husband, keep a husband, allow him all the things he needs to do, all the affairs he needs to have...basically just about trying to hold onto a man, until you die."

Davis said that some bookshops wrongly put the book in the self-help section.

Davis and Pepperdine appeared in a live-streamed video dressed in character, from an empty theatre, to promote the book. They were interviewed by comedian, Adam Buxton.

=== Appearances on other podcasts ===
Davis and Pepperdine have appeared on other podcasts in character, including:

- 2019: The High Low
- 2019: My Dad Wrote A Porno
- 2020: The Guilty Feminist
- 2020: Fortunately... with Fi and Jane
- 2020: Sue Perkins: An hour or so with...
- 2021: RHLSTP with Richard Herring

== Reception ==
In 2019, the podcast won Best Comedy at the British Podcast Awards.

Stylist described the podcast as "both uncomfortable and hysterically funny." Refinery29 described it as "the funniest, filthiest podcast around". The New Statesman described it as "brilliant, filthy satire". Bustle described it as "one of the darkest and funniest podcasts you'll ever hear."

The Guardian described it as "totally unique and one of the most cringe-inducing comedy podcasts yet." In another article, The Guardian described it as "one of the most gleefully transgressive comedies in recent history".

IMAGE magazine said: "This is a podcast which you probably shouldn’t listen to if you’re easily offended, or if you’re enjoying a nice meal or drink. The odds of you being lampooned into audio hilarity at the precise moment after you have taken a big gulp or bite, are high. As my many stained outfits will testify to."

In 2018, The Telegraph described the podcast as "the darkest, funniest comedy of the year".

Also in 2018, Cariad Lloyd recommended the show on BBC Radio 4 Extra's Podcast Radio Hour, describing it as "such a rude show", "one of the funniest things I've listened to in a long time" and that the best bit is that you can hear the presenters laughing, and they "take the joke as far as it can go".
