= Getting On (American TV series) =

U.S. TV series

- Genre: Dark comedy Medical comedy
- Created by: Mark V. Olsen; Will Scheffer
- Based on: Getting On (BBC Four series) by Jo Brand; Joanna Scanlan; Vicki Pepperdine
- Written by: Mark V. Olsen; Will Scheffer
- Directed by: Miguel Arteta; Howard Deutch; Becky Martin
- Starring: Laurie Metcalf; Alex Borstein; Niecy Nash; Mel Rodriguez
- Country of origin: United States
- Original language: English
- No. of seasons: 3
- No. of episodes: 18 (list of episodes)

Production
- Executive producers: Geoff Atkinson; Jane Tranter; Jo Brand; Joanna Scanlan; Julie Gardner; Mark V. Olsen; Vicki Pepperdine; Will Scheffer
- Producer: Chrisann Verges
- Camera setup: Single
- Running time: 30 minutes
- Production companies: Anima Sola Productions; BBC Worldwide Productions; HBO Entertainment

Original release
- Network: HBO
- Release: November 24, 2013 – December 13, 2015

Getting On is an American television comedy series based on the British series of the same name, created and written by Mark V. Olsen and Will Scheffer. The series aired on HBO from November 24, 2013 to December 13, 2015; it had three seasons, each containing six episodes. The show has garnered positive reviews from critics. It stars Laurie Metcalf, Alex Borstein, Niecy Nash, and Mel Rodriguez.

== Premise ==
The series is set in the Billy Barnes Extended Care Unit of the down-and-out Mount Palms Memorial Hospital in Long Beach, California. The show follows the lives of the staff involved in the ward's daily operation, specifically Dr. Jenna James (Laurie Metcalf), the ward's director of medicine; Dawn Forchette (Alex Borstein), the head nurse; Didi Ortley (Niecy Nash), a nurse; and Patsy De La Serda (Mel Rodriguez), the supervising nurse.

== Cast ==
=== Main cast ===
- Laurie Metcalf as Dr. Jenna James, director of medicine. She is uptight, self-centered and lacks social skills. She plays the piano, as revealed in the episode "Concert". She is usually oblivious to the offense she causes, believing people are impressed by her professionalism. In truth however, she is unintentionally psychologically abusive, especially towards head nurse Dawn. To the annoyance of her co-workers, Jenna often conducts various research studies using hospital resources. She is currently conducting a study on shrinking perineum in the elderly and one involving the use of mice. In collaboration with a hospice-care organization, Jenna introduces a hospice program into the ward, with the intent of using the extra profits to fund her research studies. However, Jenna gets greedy when she begins classifying patients that are not dying of a terminal illness as part of the hospice program. This scheme is later exposed, putting Jenna, everyone else in the ward, and the hospital in jeopardy.
- Alex Borstein as Dawn Forchette, the head nurse. Her husband has recently left her, taking her car and dog. She often lets her various personal and romantic problems affect her work performance. She always works by the rules and has a difficult relationship with Jenna, who unintentionally bullies her. She has a complicated relationship with Patsy due to the fact that she slept with him, even though he may be gay. Dawn and Patsy's relationship improves and he becomes her boyfriend. She later discovers that she is pregnant, believing Patsy to be the father. After an ultrasound, however, Dawn discovers that she was never pregnant; instead, she has had a blighted ovum. This discovery leads to difficulties in her relationship with Patsy, and they eventually break up. She later hastily marries hospital security guard Dennis Beardman, seemingly just to spite Patsy.
- Niecy Nash as Denise "Didi" Ortley, a return-to-work nurse. She is empathetic to the concerns of patients and their families, which often brings her into conflict with some of her colleagues who are more concerned with sticking to the rules. She appears to be happily married with six children, a daughter in college and a son in high school. Didi implies that her son has had issues. She is also currently taking care of her sister's children because of issues involving her sister. Didi also has a strained relationship with her half-sister Sherrie, who also is a nurse. After a hospice-care program is introduced into the ward, she is appointed as the hospice-nurse liaison.
- Mel Rodriguez as Patsy De La Serda, the supervising nurse. He is very emotional and socially awkward in the workplace. He has stated that he was on a vegan diet because he needs to lose weight. Due to his ideas regarding how to run the ward, he often comes into conflict with Dr. James, who holds more traditional views about the running of the ward. He is having a complicated relationship with Dawn, as he has identified as homosexual even though he slept with her. His relationship with Dawn improves and she becomes his girlfriend. After Dawn's suspected pregnancy is diagnosed as a blighted ovum, he begins to experience difficulties in his relationship with Dawn; they eventually break up.

=== Recurring cast ===
- Kurtis Bedford as Dennis Beardman, a hospital security guard that Dawn hastily marries after he shows a romantic interest in her.
- Marsha Stephanie Blake as Yvette Ortley, Didi's sister-in-law, with whom Didi has a contentious relationship.
- Grant Bowler as Dr. Ron Rudd, a charismatic physician from New Zealand.
- K Callan as Susan Dayward, a patient recovering from knee-replacement surgery.
- Kimberly Celemen as Kitty Doris, a medical resident whose name Jenna constantly forgets.
- Brandon Fobbs as Antoine Robertson, an orderly who flirts with Dawn.
- Ann Guilbert as Birdy Lamb, a patient who has been in the ward for some time due to a continuous flow of illnesses.
- Mark Harelik as Dr. Paul Stickley, a medical colleague of Jenna's who is later appointed the hospital's director of medicine. It is suggested that he has had an affair with Jenna in the past.
- Joel Johnstone as Andrew Cesario, a medical resident and later Jenna's research assistant.
- Lindsey Kraft as Marguerite Macaw, a student nurse.
- Scott Lawrence as Darnell Ortley, Didi's husband.
- Kasey Mahaffy as Rick Joy, a hospital administrator.
- Jayma Mays as Suzi Sasso, a corporate representative for a hospice-care organization.
- Betty Murphy as Fiona Sullivan, a patient dying of cancer.
- Mary Kay Place as Dr. Ann Killigrew, an Ob/Gyn who has a crush on Jenna.
- Corey Reynolds as Waylon Ortley, Didi's brother-in-law and Yvette's husband.
- Patricia Scanlon as Paula Pepperell, a union representative.
- Molly Shannon as Phyllis Marmatan, Fiona Sullivan's concerned daughter.
- Alia Shawkat as Colleen Hoover, a hospice-care volunteer.
- Jonathan Silverman as Dr. Happy Gladner, a physician treating Dawn's kidney disease.
- June Squibb as Varla Pounder, a racist homophobic patient suffering from bipolar disorder, borderline personality disorder, and schizophrenia. Later, Varla suffers from gangrene, and has one foot amputated.
- Harry Dean Stanton as Leonard Butler, Birdy's boyfriend.
- Luke Zimmerman as Sammy Beardman, Dennis's brother who has Down syndrome.

=== Guest stars ===
- Telma Hopkins as Beverly Raymes, the ward's no-nonsense supervising nurse who was reassigned to another floor.
- Daniel Stern as Richard James, Jenna's husband.
- Gita Hall as Ingrid Larsen, a Swedish patient whom Jenna takes an interest in.
- Irma P. Hall as Cordelia Meade, an unruly patient who causes trouble in the ward.
- Lynn Cohen as Janice Carmaglia, a participant in Dr. James' study on shrinking perineum.
- Betty Buckley as Dottie Levy, a patient suffering from life-threatening alcoholism.
- Jean Smart as Arlene Willy-Weller, the daughter-in-law of a patient with dementia.
- Carrie Preston as Denya Thorp, a patient with terminal ovarian cancer.
- Tsai Chin as Ruth Lee, a patient suffering from aphasia and paralysis.
- Michelle Krusiec as Andrea Conrad, Ruth's daughter.
- Rhea Perlman as Crystal Buff, an inmate from Sing Sing prison who is checked into the ward.
- Frances Conroy as Dr. Alice Marvel, a physician and Jenna's rival.
- Ivonne Coll as Gloria De La Serda, Patsy's mother.
- Vicki Pepperdine as Dr. Pippa Moore, a British physician who bears striking similarities to Jenna. Pepperdine reprises her role from the original British television series.
- Joanna Scanlan as Denise "Den" Flixter, a British nursing sister who bears striking similarities to Dawn. Scanlan reprises her role from the original British television series.
- Kristen Johnston as Marla Pounder, Varla's long-lost daughter.
- Janis Ian as Mrs. Belfontaine, a patient in the ward that spends all her time singing.
- Rita Moreno as Sister Lily Claire, a hospital administrator from a Catholic hospital that offers Jenna a job.

== Episodes ==
Season	Episodes	Originally released	
Season	Episodes	First released	Last released
1	6	November 24, 2013	December 29, 2013
2	6	November 9, 2014	December 14, 2014
3	6	November 8, 2015	December 13, 2015

== Production and development ==
On August 14, 2012, HBO placed a pilot order on an American adaptation of the popular BBC Four series of the same name. Mark V. Olsen and Will Scheffer were attached to write the pilot script and serve as executive producers alongside Jane Tranter, Julie Gardner and Geoff Atkinson via Anima Sola Productions and BBC Worldwide Productions.

Casting announcements began in the following November with Laurie Metcalf, Alex Borstein and Niecy Nash cast in the three lead roles. Metcalf signed onto the role of Dr. Jenna James, the uptight, self-centered director of medicine; Borstein joined in the role of Dawn Forchette, the head nurse who struggles with self-esteem and ultimately ends up in inappropriate sexual situations; and Nash cast in the remaining lead role of Denise "DiDi" Ortley, a big-hearted, return-to-work nurse.

On March 21, 2013, HBO placed a six-episode series order on the series. The series six-episode first season premiered on HBO on November 24, 2013, and concluded on December 29, 2013. On February 19, 2014, Getting On was renewed for a six-episode second season, of which premiered on November 9, 2014, and concluded on December 14, 2014. On February 9, 2015, HBO renewed the series for a third and final season to consist of six episodes. The third and final season premiered on November 8, 2015, and concluded on December 13, 2015.

== Reception ==
=== Critical response ===
The first season received positive reviews. On Rotten Tomatoes, the season has an approval rating of 76% with an average rating of 7.6 out of 10 based on 29 reviews. The critics' consensus is, "Though sometimes juvenile in nature, Getting On finds the funny, even in a somber setting, with humorous yet sensitive narratives and characterizations." The pilot episode scored a 73 out of 100 on Metacritic based on 21 reviews, indicating "generally favorable reviews". In a highly positive review, San Francisco Chronicle contributor David Wiegand said, "There is a brilliant mix of poignancy and hilarity in Getting On, which is why it all works so well." Emily VanDerWerff of The A.V. Club wrote "Getting On captures the drudgery of work and life in this ward, but it also catches glimpses of the beauty, and it’s in those moments that it feels like a series that deserves better than it’s going to get." On the more negative side, Mike Lechevallier of Slant Magazine wrote that "the show's setting is such an overwhelmingly depressing environment that much of the offbeat humor ends up flatlining."

On Rotten Tomatoes, the second season scored a 100% approval rating with an average rating of 8.6 out of 10 based on 11 reviews. The critics' consensus is "Getting On continues to work by poking fun at a typically serious theme and the psychological drama surrounding it, with a dose of laugh-out-loud slapstick injected into a big, sweet heart." On Metacritic, the second season has a score of 85 out of 100 based on 6 review, indicating "universal acclaim".

The third season received very positive reviews. On Rotten Tomatoes, the third season scored a 100% approval rating with an average rating of 9 out of 10 based on 11 reviews. The critics' consensus is "Getting On's penchant for shaping everyday struggles – no matter how banal – into brutal and heartwarming humor concludes the series with hilarious results." On Metacritic, it has a score of 85 out of 100 based on 6 reviews, indicating "universal acclaim". Melissa Maerz of Entertainment Weekly gave it an "A−" grade and wrote, "In its third and final season, the series is still brilliantly droll, elevating the most mundane moments into something that's either hilariously awkward or genuinely moving–or, at its best, both."

=== Accolades ===
At the 67th Primetime Emmy Awards, Niecy Nash received a nomination for Outstanding Supporting Actress in a Comedy Series. At the 6th Critics' Choice Television Awards, Niecy Nash was nominated for Best Supporting Actress in a Comedy Series and Mel Rodriguez was nominated for Best Supporting Actor in a Comedy Series. At the 68th Primetime Emmy Awards, Laurie Metcalf was nominated for Outstanding Lead Actress in a Comedy Series and Niecy Nash received a second consecutive nomination for Outstanding Supporting Actress in a Comedy Series.

== Home media ==
The first season was released on DVD and Blu-ray in region 1 on November 11, 2014, and region 4 on November 12, 2014. The one-disc set includes all six season one episodes, a gag reel and deleted scenes. The second season was released on DVD and Blu-ray in region 1 on November 3, 2015. The third season was released on DVD in region 1 on March 29, 2016.
