= Getting On (British TV series) =

British comedy television series

- Genre: Sitcom; Black comedy
- Created by: Jo Brand; Vicki Pepperdine; Joanna Scanlan
- Written by: Jo Brand; Vicki Pepperdine; Joanna Scanlan
- Directed by: Peter Capaldi; Susan Tully
- Starring: Jo Brand; Vicki Pepperdine; Joanna Scanlan; Ricky Grover
- Ending theme: "Roll River Roll" by Richard Hawley
- Country of origin: United Kingdom
- Original language: English
- No. of series: 3
- No. of episodes: 15

Production
- Running time: 30 minutes
- Production company: Vera Productions

Original release
- Network: BBC Four
- Release: 8 July 2009 – 21 November 2012

Related
- Getting On (American TV series); Going Forward

Getting On is a satirical British sitcom based on a geriatric ward in an NHS hospital. It is written by its core cast, Jo Brand, Vicki Pepperdine, and Joanna Scanlan. Series 1 and 2 were directed by Peter Capaldi, who also appears as Dr. Healy. It first aired in July 2009, for three episodes. The second series of six episodes aired in 2010, with the third series (also of six episodes) airing in late 2012. Despite strong critical acclaim, the show was not recommissioned for a fourth series. It was shot in the closed Plaistow Hospital.

An American version of Getting On began airing on HBO in November 2013 and concluded in December 2015.

A three-part spin-off series, Going Forward, was announced in March 2016 and began airing in May 2016 on BBC Four.

== Characters ==
- Kim Wilde, played by Jo Brand, is a return-to-work nurse who must adapt to the difficulties the modern NHS throws at her, with C. diff, form-filling, and political correctness. She is the staff member most empathetic to the concerns of patients and their families, which often brings her into conflict with her colleagues, who are more concerned with sticking to the rules. She appears to be happily married to Dave, with several children, though her life outside the ward is rarely touched upon.
- Dr Pippa Moore, played by Vicki Pepperdine, is the "tough but fair" Care of The Elderly Consultant. She is uptight, self-centred, and lacking in "people skills", often being discourteous to her colleagues, her medical students, and even the patients. She, however, remains oblivious to the offence she causes, believing that people are impressed by her professionalism. At the start of the series, she is married to a pilot called Philip; however, the marriage is not happy. She has something of a crush on her psychiatrist colleague, Dr Healy, but he has no feelings for her.
- Denise "Den" Flixter, played by Joanna Scanlan, is the ward sister and Wilde's immediate superior. She is legally separated from her husband.
- Hilary Loftus, played by Ricky Grover, is the male matron. He has a relationship with Den, which is complicated by the fact that he is clearly inexperienced in romantic relationships, as well as identifying as homosexual.

== Reception ==
The show has received very high praise from television critics across the board in the UK, with praise for the actors' performances, and the gritty, realistic portrayal of an NHS hospital. The Telegraph listed it as the best British television show of the year.

Brand, Scanlan, and Pepperdine won the 2010 Royal Television Society Award for Best Writing in Comedy. and in 2010 the three also won the Writer's Guild Award for Best Comedy.

Both Jo Brand and Joanna Scanlan were nominated for the 2010 BAFTA Television Award for Best Female Comedy Performance. Jo Brand won the BAFTA for her performance in 2011.

For the third series, Brand, Scanlan and Pepperdine were nominated for the 2012 Royal Television Society Award and the BAFTA Award for Best Writing in Comedy.

== Episodes ==
Series	Episodes	Originally released		Average UK viewers
Series	Episodes	First released	Last released	Average UK viewers
1	3	8 July 2009	22 July 2009	577,000
2	6	26 October 2010	30 November 2010	—
3	6	17 October 2012	21 November 2012	494,000

=== Series 1 (2009) ===
No. overall	No. in series	Title	Directed by	Written by	Original release date	Viewers
1	1	"Episode 1"	Peter Capaldi	Jo Brand, Vicki Pepperdine & Joanna Scanlan	8 July 2009	861,000
Sister Den Flixter, Nurse Kim Wilde and Dr. Pippa Moore work on a geriatric ward. An elderly patient called Lily is discovered dead on her eighty-seventh birthday. While packing up Lily's possessions, they steal her birthday cake. Faeces is discovered on a chair and Kim is given mixed messages on cleaning it and giving it to Pippa for her stool collection. Kim and Den are having difficulties in understanding a Bangladeshi patient who can't speak English. New male matron Hilary Loftus arrives on the ward and Den pours her heart out to him about her failed marriage to a fraudster.
2	2	"Episode 2"	Peter Capaldi	Jo Brand, Vicki Pepperdine & Joanna Scanlan	15 July 2009	504,000
An aggressive, foul-mouthed patient called Ivy causes trouble for staff and patients. She uses racist and homophobic language, lights up cigarettes on the ward and attacks members of staff with a bottle. Hilary is traumatised by events and Ivy has to be sedated and transferred to a psychiatric ward. Hilary agrees to go on a date with Den.
3	3	"Episode 3"	Peter Capaldi	Jo Brand, Vicki Pepperdine & Joanna Scanlan	22 July 2009	367,000
The aftermath of the fight with Ivy has left a problem, with Hilary accusing Kim of making an inappropriate remark during the fight and insisting on disciplinary action. Kim has called in her union rep to defend her, but the meeting does little to improve the situation. Hilary demands the ward be shut down for a deep cleaning, forcing extra work on the staff. Pippa leaves for a health conference abroad, with her stool sample research complete.

=== Series 2 (2010) ===
No. overall	No. in series	Title	Directed by	Written by	Original release date	Viewers
4	1	"Episode 1"	Peter Capaldi	Jo Brand, Vicki Pepperdine & Joanna Scanlan	26 October 2010	566,000
A horrendously smelly, unidentified old woman is brought in and does the rounds of all the other wards because nobody else will take her in, eventually returning to B4 and leading to friction between Den and Hilary. Meanwhile a Mrs Fyvie is admitted and her daughter Beedy, who has read all about medication on the Internet, challenges Pippa's treatment of her mother's care.
5	2	"Episode 2"	Peter Capaldi	Jo Brand, Vicki Pepperdine & Joanna Scanlan	2 November 2010	440,000
New admission Peggy Lowe causes problems with her claim that she was ill-treated in her care home, so the last thing over-worked Kim and Den want is an inquiry after Peggy gets dropped whilst being bathed. Den hopes that her influence on Hilary - their secret affair gradually coming into the open - will get them off the hook when Peggy's son comes to complain. And in a way it does.
6	3	"Episode 3"	Peter Capaldi	Jo Brand, Vicki Pepperdine & Joanna Scanlan	9 November 2010	365,000
Kim is on her own on the night shift when an elderly Italian woman with little English is admitted. Pippa is called away from a party to see her and is excited when she believes the woman is pregnant and could make medical history, bringing the ward fame. She is not happy when a whole posse of Italian medics take the woman away and Den is not happy, when, arriving from the agency where she moon-lights, she confides in Kim about her relationship with Hilary. Hilary shows up to have things out with her so, all in all, it is not the uneventful night Kim wanted.
7	4	"Episode 4"	Peter Capaldi	Jo Brand, Vicki Pepperdine & Joanna Scanlan	16 November 2010	283,000
Hilary announces his new initiative of Icing the Cake, which, to Kim's annoyance, is purely symbolic, the 'icing' representing excellent service. Hoping to apply a little icing Pippa apologizes to Den for giving a reference some years earlier which stopped her getting a flat. Den lets fly at her so, to atone, she offers to help her move house before enjoying a lunch date with Peter, unaware that she may have to reapply for her job. Den and Hilary, following the revelation of his outburst, agree to be friends and she offers to go to a gay bar with him.
8	5	"Episode 5"	Peter Capaldi	Jo Brand, Vicki Pepperdine & Joanna Scanlan	23 November 2010	305,000
Kim is doubly irritated by know-all student nurse Damaris Clarke and by a talking life size cut-out giving instructions on hand washing. Due to Pippa's varying diagnoses on ailing Mrs. Fyvie, her Edinburgh-based daughter Beedy is repeatedly called into the ward on false alarms and Den and Kim take sadistic pleasure in knowing that Pippa has had to reapply for her job.
9	6	"Episode 6"	Peter Capaldi	Jo Brand, Vicki Pepperdine & Joanna Scanlan	30 November 2010	N/A
There is an even bigger air of gloom on the ward than usual. Pippa has failed to get the job she was after and Kim is angry that she will not be promoted and that Pippa has yet to pay her husband for work done. Beedy is understandably upset when her mother, only just dead, is moved out of the ward so another patient can have her bed. At least Den and Hilary have something to celebrate, as they decide to get engaged. But then Den's ex-husband reappears, to win her back.

=== Series 3 (2012) ===
No. overall	No. in series	Title	Directed by	Written by	Original release date	Viewers
10	1	"Episode 1"	Susan Tully	Jo Brand, Vicki Pepperdine & Joanna Scanlan	17 October 2012	547,000
It's a new day, it's a new dawn, it's a new ward. King Edwards has shut, B4 is no more. Kim, Den and Pippa have moved to neighbouring St Jude's in anticipation of a now-stalled redevelopment. Their new home, twin-bayed K2, is modern and clean - all appears well. But behind the glossy facade lie the same old patients and problems, and beyond that comes a long list of new worries. Kim is barely keeping her head above water, home life for Pippa is no more settled, and Den is about to discover her own brand new challenge. With Hilary Loftus looking for efficiency savings and diversity cup cakes on the menu courtesy of modern matron Damaris (Cush Jumbo), the staff once again get on with the daily task of getting on.
11	2	"Episode 2"	Susan Tully	Jo Brand, Vicki Pepperdine & Joanna Scanlan	24 October 2012	496,000
Another shift, another shuttle bus to miss. The appearance of Dr Kersley and his commissioning consortia plans hints at the changes ahead for K2. Den enjoys her new-found treats, nice Damaris has her feet firmly under the desk, Kim makes a bold career move and Pippa deals with a pressing legal issue. Vag-At research under way, Dr Moore has plenty to take her mind off marital disharmony until a nasty online surprise brings her crashing back down to ground. But it's her cafetiere, brought in from home, that steals the show courtesy of Doris and a mix-up with the dementia care assistant.
12	3	"Episode 3"	Susan Tully	Jo Brand, Vicki Pepperdine & Joanna Scanlan	31 October 2012	465,000
Hypochondriacal Mrs Dethick is re-admitted, adding to Den's problems. Kim finds help from an unexpected quarter, while Hilary is a man on a mission as the different designations of waste offer him a way back onto the ward. Megan (Helen Griffin) is having trouble drumming up support for the forthcoming strike, while Pippa benefits from previously unseen talents hidden away on K2. The lights go down on another shift at K2 leaving Mrs Dethick in the dark and Den in a dark place. With Megan moody and Pippa scornful, Kim reluctantly turns to Damaris for help with her studies and sparks off an unexpected alliance.
13	4	"Episode 4"	Susan Tully	Jo Brand, Vicki Pepperdine & Joanna Scanlan	7 November 2012	540,000
A tough day on the ward. Kim has given up smoking and is feeling the effects, Den has a secret she's trying to hide, Pippa has a moment or two, and Hilary is out on the prowl looking for cuts. Matters come to a head with the arrival of a private patient and the search for a side ward, with Dr Kersley (Tobias Menzies) applying the pressure. With accommodation on the agenda Den finds herself homeless courtesy of overcrowding at Kim's, and a hapless attempt to bully a solution results in Kim having no mentor and Pippa in a rage. With a coma patient to shift and a makeshift office to dismantle, the walls are closing in on Sister Flixter. Shift ended and Kim dispatched, it's time to call in a favour from an unlikely source.
14	5	"Episode 5"	Susan Tully	Jo Brand, Vicki Pepperdine & Joanna Scanlan	14 November 2012	478,000
A few days have passed and the stormclouds have continued to gather. Damaris has gone, Megan is angry, Den is playing games and Mrs Dethick is back on the ward. On a positive note, Hansley (Babou Ceesay) has turned out to be something of a star turn and the Vag-At is going from strength to strength – at least it was, until a mix up with the oncology Christmas card competition leads to complications. A delicate situation needs careful handling, as a funny turn with the coma patient has unexpected consequences. Back on Red Bay, there's bad news for Mrs Dethick and a bittersweet moment as Pippa again defuses a tricky situation and still finds time to settle up with Hansley.
15	6	"Episode 6"	Susan Tully	Jo Brand, Vicki Pepperdine & Joanna Scanlan	21 November 2012	438,000
Artist Dylan Schwarz (Sandro Kopp) and his assistant Elke (Tilda Swinton) arrive on K2 to set up a kids art project. Pippa is attracting the attention of Dr Kersley and obstetrician Dr Tatty Oxford (Anastasia Hille), who in turn has a surprise of her own to spring on Den. Kim confesses that Dave has been offered a job in Iraq, Den ponders her own unexpected news and Pippa makes a discovery of a different kind in a corner at Chatters. Dylan's endeavours help solve one patient's diagnosis, but off the ward Den's announcement ends in a more brutal fashion with fisticuffs for Hilary. With Vag-At research a success, Pippa celebrates funding approval with a suitably open-mouthed Josh, but her now ex-husband Phillip (Hugh Bonneville) has one more surprise to spring.

== Home video releases ==
All three series of Getting On have been released on DVD via 2entertain distribution. "Series One" was released on 7 September 2009, while "Series Two" was released 6 December 2010. Following this, a box set containing both "Series One" and "Series Two" was released on 6 December 2010. "Series Three" received its release on 26 November 2012. A complete series box set containing all three series was made available on 26 November 2012.

In Australia, the "Complete Series 1 & 2" was released on 7 July 2011 via Roadshow distribution. As of yet, the third series has not been released in Australia.
