= Melanie Hudson =

English actress and comedian

Melanie Hudson is an English actress and comedian. With Vicki Pepperdine, she was part of the double act Hudson and Pepperdine. The two women wrote and starred in BBC Radio 4's The Hudson and Pepperdine Show. Hudson performed multiple roles in Knowing Me, Knowing You... with Alan Partridge (KMKY), including Alan's French co-host Nina Vanier. She played Lauren Cooper's French teacher in a sketch on The Catherine Tate Show. She has also worked with the KMKY team in a number of projects, including The Friday Night Armistice and The Armando Iannucci Shows.

She also played Alexi the ant in the short-lived animated series Anthony Ant, and Fluffy in a film created for the BKN Classic Series anthology series of films Robin Hood: Quest for the King (with Anthony Ant co-star Alan Marriott directing the voice actors) and lent her voice to two video games Colony Wars: Vengeance and MediEvil II for PlayStation. Hudson had a guest role as Nancy Dean Liebhart in an episode of the radio comedy Cabin Pressure entitled "Qikiqtarjuaq".
