= Mel Rodriguez =

American actor and comedian (born 1973)

Mel Rodríguez
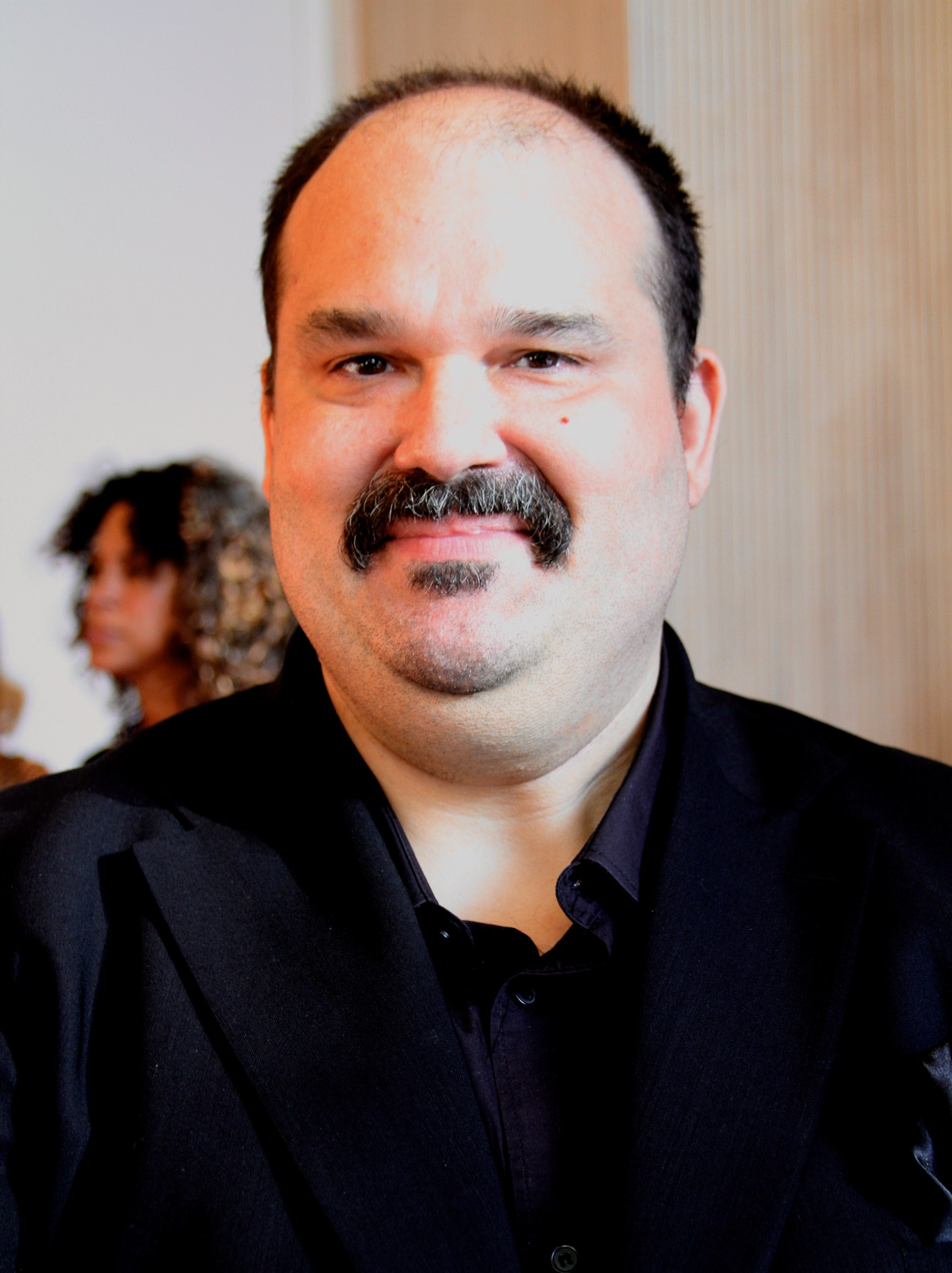
- Rodriguez at 2014 Imagen Awards
- Born: Melvin Dimas Rodríguez; June 12, 1973 (age 53); Miami, Florida, U.S.
- Education: State University of New York, Purchase (BFA)
- Occupations: Actor and comedian
- Years active: 1999–present

Melvin Dimas Rodríguez (born June 12, 1973) is an American actor and comedian, best known for starring as Nurse Patsy de la Serda on the HBO comedy Getting On, as Todd Rodriguez on the Fox comedy The Last Man on Earth, and as Ernie Gomes on the Showtime drama On Becoming a God in Central Florida. Other notable works include recurring as Marco Pasternak on AMC's Better Call Saul and co-starring on the short-lived Fox sitcoms Running Wilde and Enlisted. In 2021, Rodriguez appeared in the crime television series CSI: Vegas.

== Life and career ==
Rodríguez, who is of Cuban American heritage, was born in Miami, Florida, and grew up in its Little Havana neighborhood. He first pursued a career in boxing, until he was led onto the path of acting by his high school teacher at age 17, first starring in an AIDS awareness play entitled The Inner Circle with Pedro Zamora. He dropped out of high school and managed to receive a scholarship, at the prestigious theatre arts and film conservatory at SUNY Purchase. After his graduation, Rodríguez stayed in New York, managed a cigar shop, and worked primarily in theatre. He did his first role on screen in 1999 in an episode of the legal drama television series Law & Order, which was filming in the state. Rodríguez then moved to Los Angeles, focusing more on his career in the film industry and less on his acting on stage. His first role in a full-length feature film was in the 1999 comedy Wirey Spindell. He achieved his breakthrough by scoring the recurring role of Frank on the ABC comedy series George Lopez in 2002.

Rodríguez is most known for his recurring roles as Sgt. Núñez on Community and SPC Chubowski on the Fox sitcom Enlisted. He portrayed Marco Pasternak, the best friend and partner-in-crime of Jimmy McGill in the first and third seasons of Better Call Saul. He had a brief role as Officer Morales in the 2002 film Panic Room, and was a main cast member on The Last Man on Earth (2015). He also appeared as Officer Martinez in Little Miss Sunshine (2006).

Rodriguez decided to depart CSI: Vegas after its first season as Medical Examiner Hugo Ramirez.

In 2025, he played engineer Bruce Geller in the Netflix series The Residence.

== Filmography ==
=== Film ===
Year	Title	Role	Notes
1999	Wirey Spindell	Ernesto	
2002	Panic Room	Officer Morales	
2002	Deuces Wild	Big Dom	
2002	Showtime	Armored Car Driver	Uncredited
2004	The Terminal	Man in Cast	Uncredited
2004	Garfield: The Movie	Security Officer	
2005	The Three Burials of Melquiades Estrada	Captain Gómez	
2006	Shark Bait	Dr. Tang/Manny	Voice role
2006	Big Top	Harris	
2006	Unknown	Lone Cop	
2006	Little Miss Sunshine	Officer Martinez	
2008	Lakeview Terrace	Julio Pacheco	
2008	Choke.Kick.Girl	Mel	Short film
2009	West of Brooklyn	Sal	
2012	The Watch	Chucho	
2012	The Producer		Short film
2013	Fat	Ken	
2013	Playing Clean	Mel	Short film
2014	Suburban Gothic	Hector	
2016	Brave New Jersey	Sheriff Dandy	
2017	Captain Underpants: The First Epic Movie	Morty Fyde	Voice role; cameo
2018	Overboard	Bobby	
2020	The Last Thing He Wanted	Barry Sedlow	
2020	Onward	Colt Bronco	Voice role
2020	We Bare Bears: The Movie	Darrell	Voice role
2025	Sarah's Oil	Mace	Post-production

=== Television ===
Year	Title	Role	Notes
1999	Law & Order	Bill Crawford	Episode: "Disciple"
1999	Third Watch	T-shirt Man	Episode: "Welcome to Camelot"
1999	Spin City		
2002–2007	George Lopez	Frank	5 episodes
2002	Malcolm in the Middle	Neil	Episode: "Reese Drives"
2002	Gilmore Girls	Raul	Episode: "Lorelai's Graduation Day"
2002	Fidel	Calixto Morales	Television film
2002	Andy Richter Controls the Universe	Mel	Episode: "Relationship Ripcord"
2004	CSI: NY	Al McGrath	Episode: "A Man a Mile"
2004	In the Game	Jason	Show cancelled after pilot
2004	Beverly Hills S.U.V.		Show cancelled after pilot
2004	NYPD Blue	Norman Reese	Episode: "Chatty Chatty Bang Bang"
2004	The Bernie Mac Show		Episode: "My Privacy"
2004	Ghost Whisperer	Owen	Episode: "Ghost, Interrupted"
2007	Without a Trace	Mel Heinz	Episode: "One Wrong Move"
2007	Notes from the Underbelly		Episode: "Oleander"
2008	Kath & Kim	Warren	Episode: "Money"
2008	Raising the Bar		Episode: "Bagels and Locks"
2008–2009	Tyler Perry's House of Payne	Carlos Hernandez	3 episodes
2009	FlashForward	Oscar Obregon	2 episodes
2009	The Middle	Mr. Perez	Episode: "The Trip"
2010	Big Love	Don Dona	2 episodes
2010–2011	Running Wilde	Migo Salazar	13 episodes
2010–2012	Choke.Kick.Girl	Just Mel	Web series
2011	Workaholics	Ryan	Episode: "Checkpoint Gnarly"
2011	Community	Sgt. Núñez	3 episodes
2012	Hot in Cleveland	Hector	Episode: "What's Behind the Door"
2013	The New Normal	Gerald	Episode: "Rocky Bye Baby"
2013–2015	Getting On	Patsy De La Serda	17 episodes
2014	Enlisted	SPC George Chubowski	8 episodes
2015, 2017	Better Call Saul	Marco Pasternak	3 episodes
2015–2018	The Last Man on Earth	Todd Rodriguez	Series regular; 43 episodes
2016–2018	We Bare Bears	Darrell	Voice; 3 episodes
2018	Philip K. Dick's Electric Dreams	Philbert Noyce	Episode: "Kill All Others"
2018	Grace and Frankie	Officer Terry Velez	Episode: "The Lodger"
2018	Animals.	Lieutenant	5 episodes
2019	On Becoming a God in Central Florida	Ernie	10 episodes
2020	Briarpatch	Mayor Tony Salazar	
2021	Made for Love	Ignacio	
2021–2022	CSI: Vegas	Hugo Ramirez	Main cast
2022	The Afterparty	Captain Ostrander	Episode: "Maggie"
2023	Carol & The End of the World	Luis Felipe Jacinto	5 episodes, Voice role
2025	The Residence	Bruce Geller	8 episodes
2026	St. Denis Medical	Mel	Episode: "Experience with human babies"

=== Music videos ===
Year	Title	Artist	Notes
2014	"Greens and Blues"	Pixies	
