= Dave Lamb =

British actor

- Born: David Alexander Lamb; 17 January 1969 (age 57); Westminster, London, England
- Occupations: Actor; comedian; narrator; presenter
- Years active: 1993–present
- Known for: Narrator of Come Dine With Me

David Alexander Lamb (born 17 January 1969) is an English actor, comedian, narrator and presenter. He is best known for his narration work on Come Dine with Me as well as appearances in British television and radio programmes, especially comedy programmes like Goodness Gracious Me. He also presented the CBBC game show Horrible Histories: Gory Games.

== Early life ==
Lamb attended the Broxbourne School in Broxbourne, Hertfordshire, and studied philosophy and literature at the University of Warwick.

== Early work ==
Lamb's first noted credit was in the 1998 British sitcom How Do You Want Me? He played a homophobic tramp called Buster. His first notable appearances were in the British Indian sketch show Goodness Gracious Me, being the only recurring white person in the cast. Throughout the 1990s and early 2000s he also appeared in comedy programmes such as People Like Us, Hippies, Armstrong and Miller, The Smoking Room and Fun at the Funeral Parlour as well as having a brief role in a couple of episodes of EastEnders. He also made a brief appearance in DIY SOS.

== Voice-over work ==
Lamb was one of the main voice-over artists on satirical cartoon 2DTV alongside Jan Ravens and Jon Culshaw, but he gained cult status through his sarcastic voice-overs on dinner party show Come Dine with Me which began in 2005. In an interview, he claimed that in the first series he did do quite a lot of ad-libbing but that the show's writers now know how to write for his voice. He also stated that he would never take part in a celebrity edition as he wasn't famous enough to participate.

In 2008, Lamb provided a voice for one of the Spade brothers in Lionhead Studios' Fable II and again in 2010 for Fable III.

Lamb narrated Come Dine with Me-style sketches for five episodes of Horrible Histories, between 2010 and 2013.

In 2011, for the Big Brother 2011 "Come Dine with Me" task, Lamb took over from usual narrator Marcus Bentley for the feature, the first time that anyone other than Bentley had provided a voice-over for the show.

He starred in a voice-over part for a character in the 2011 MMORPG Star Wars: The Old Republic.

He also narrates Come Dine with Me Ireland and Come Dine with Me South Africa and provides the voice-over on the CBeebies animated shows Big Barn Farm and Waybuloo. He narrated a special section of Blue Peter on 25 October 2011. The section was a spoof of Come Dine with Me at a zoo where the guests were animals.

In May 2012, he did a voice over for UK band Jackdaw4 on their PledgeMusic page, to promote their pledge campaign to record their fourth album.

In November 2013, Lamb provided a voice over for Bedford Modern School's production of "The Only Way", a play commemorating 10 years of co-education.

He narrates the 2015 reboot of Danger Mouse. He also voices Stiletto Mafiosa in the series. He also narrated the live stage show of Danger Mouse at Butlins in 2017–2018.

In 2018, Lamb was the commentator on BBC One's Saturday evening game show And They're Off ... for Sport Relief, presented by Ore Oduba.

== Subsequent TV appearances ==
Lamb has had two main-cast roles in television sitcoms, firstly as producer Des in BBC's The Life and Times of Vivienne Vyle (broadcast October 2007) and then in early 2008 he played put-upon television writer Carl Morris in ITV's Moving Wallpaper. He also played Sergeant Foster in two episodes of Only Fools and Horses prequel Rock & Chips, shown on BBC One in the 2010 Christmas season and April 2011.

He co-presented the CBBC children's game show Horrible Histories: Gory Games from 2011 until its end in 2018, and was a regular on the first series of Alexander Armstrong's Big Ask. In 2009, he appeared in Miranda, in the episode in which Miranda pretends to go to Thailand. In 2014, he appeared alongside the rest of the original cast of Goodness Gracious Me in a reunion special that was produced for BBC Two's 50th Anniversary.

In 2016, Lamb presented Come Dine with Me: Champion of Champions, the first time in the 11-year history of the show that he had appeared on screen rather than just narrating.

== Radio ==
Lamb was a member of radio comedy troupe The Cheese Shop and has also featured on radio recording three series of The Bigger Issues as well as featuring on 15 Minute Musical, The Alan Davies Show, ElvenQuest, No Future in Eternity, The Big Town All Stars, The Very World of Milton Jones, Artists and The Way It Is. He has also recorded two series of a radio drama titled London, Europe for Radio 4, which he also wrote. Radio 4 aired his sitcom, Hobby Bobbies during Summer 2013.

== Film ==
| Year | Title | Role | Notes |
|---|---|---|---|
| 2019 | Horrible Histories: The Movie – Rotten Romans | Dougal | |

== Stage work ==
Lamb made his stage debut alongside Russ Abbot and Eric Sykes in 2003 in a production of Ray Cooney's Caught in the Net at the Vaudeville Theatre.

== Personal life ==
Lamb lives in Lewes and is a regular at the Dripping Pan, home of Lewes FC. He is a shareholder in the club.
