= Wolf It =

- Wolf It title caption
- Created by: Ged Allen, Don Austen & John Ecclestone
- Starring: Don Austen; John Eccleston
- Country of origin: United Kingdom
- Original language: English
- No. of series: 4
- No. of episodes: 35

Production
- Producer: Ged Allen
- Running time: 25 minutes
- Production company: Scottish Television

Original release
- Network: ITV (CITV)
- Release: 4 November 1993 – 18 September 1996

Wolf It is a British children's television programme with puppets produced by Kim Kinnie for Scottish Television. It was broadcast on CITV for 4 seasons between 1993 and 1996. The show is a spin off from the Saturday morning television series What's Up Doc? and features Bro and Bro, two English wolves who featured regularly in the aforementioned show. The programme was filmed in and around the Maidstone television studios, where it was also set, with Bro and Bro having set up home in a film vault.

The wolves called each other "Bro". Their real names were never heard, as there was always some noise which would mask whatever was being said by any person who was saying their names at the time.

The show replaced Rolf's Cartoon Club, and like the previous show, also showed cartoons, all from the Looney Tunes and Merrie Melodies series, which ITV owned the rights to at the time, 2 shorts were shown each episode.

Bro and Bro were voiced by Don Austen and John Eccleston. Eccleston was replaced for series 3 onwards of What's Up Doc? by Dave Chapman, though Eccleston continued to perform his character for all episodes of Wolf It!

Series 3 and 4 were known as Wolf It: The Nexxxt Generation.

== Releases ==
In 1994, a video was released containing 4 episodes from the first series, albeit without the cartoon shorts. However, apart from this, there have been no further releases, and the episodes have not been rerun.

== Trivia ==
- Eccleston and Austen have been frequent collaborators as puppeteers. The year before Wolf It's second series they introduced the leprechaun characters Mr Sage and Mr Onion on BBC Saturday Morning show Live & Kicking who remained on the series until its final broadcast. They also puppeteered Iver & Groove on pre-school programme The Hoobs and Scratch and Sniff on both ITV Saturday Morning show Ministry of Mayhem and its spin-off Scratch & Sniff's Den of Doom.

== Transmission guide ==
- Series 1: 13 editions from 4 November 1993 – 10 February 1994
- Series 2: 12 editions from 21 September 1994 – 7 December 1994
- Renamed Wolf it - The Next Generation
- Series 3: 8 editions from 23 August 1995 – 11 October 1995
- Series 4: 4 editions from 28 August 1996 – 18 September 1996
