= Steve Wilson (presenter) =

English television presenter

- Born: September 19, 1974 (age 51)
- Occupations: Author, Television Presenter
- Years active: 1999-present
- Television: This Morning
- Height: 5 ft 11 in (180 cm)

Stephen John Wilson (born 19 September 1974 in Croydon, Greater London), is a British television presenter and author, best known for presenting ITV's This Morning programme, as well as CBBC and Live & Kicking in 1999 and 2000.

Wilson currently runs the personalised gift company FromLucy&Co with his wife Lucy Tapper. He is author, along with Tapper, of the book Hedgehugs.

From 2005 until 2006, Wilson presented the CITV show Feel the Fear with Holly Willoughby.

He appears on ITV's daytime programme This Morning, where he hosts the gifts, gadgets, toys, outdoor living and leisure segments as well as the game Guess The Gadget. .

Steve is also one of the founding members of the group Rocker Division, alongside his three brothers Dave, Mike and Vic.
