= Run the Risk =

British children's game show

- Genre: Children's game show
- Presented by: Peter Simon; Shane Richie (1992-94); John Eccleston (1994); Bobby Davro (1995-96)
- Voices of: Mitch Johnson (1996)
- Country of origin: United Kingdom
- Original language: English
- No. of series: 5
- No. of episodes: 81

Production
- Running time: 25 minutes

Original release
- Network: BBC1
- Release: 26 September 1992 – 28 December 1996

Run the Risk is a British children's game show, which ran from 26 September 1992 to 28 December 1996. It aired as part of the Saturday morning shows Going Live! and Live & Kicking. It was presented by Peter Simon for the entire run alongside Shane Richie, John Eccleston and Bobby Davro. The games the teams had to do involved gunge and were similar to those performed on It's a Knockout. Run the Risk borrowed much from its predecessor, Double Dare, which was also hosted by Simon. The links for the show were written by John Mann and Paul Dudderidge.

== Format ==
In the first few series, there was an opening stunt worth 10 points, followed by three rounds of three questions each, though each team was limited to one correct answer. In round 1, the first question was worth 10 points; the second, 20; and the third, 30. All question values increased by 10 with each new round. The links for the show were written by Paul Dudderidge.

At the end of each question round, the team that had answered the highest-valued question correctly was given a choice to either "run the risk" by taking part in a timed stunt, or to force another team to "run the risk." (In the John Eccelston era, the team that had answered the highest-valued question correctly were not given a choice and were forced to "run the risk"). If the team "ran the risk," and completed the conditions of the stunt within the allotted time, the team would receive as many points as the highest-valued question in the round (i.e., 30, 40, or 50), plus a 20-point bonus for "running the risk" themselves. If the team failed, the other two teams would each receive half of the points (but none of the bonus). Should the team nominate another team, then there are no bonus points available, and the points go to the team "running the risk" (if successful), or the nominating team (if unsuccessful).

One final question round was played with no stunt, with 40, 50, and 60 points available on each question (still only one question to a team, however).

After that, the teams face the "Final Risk," an obstacle course. In the first series, this consisted of a fairly simple task. One member from each team was placed inside a large fancy dress costume. The member from the team in the lead was placed directly at the start line, while the other two teams were placed further back based on how far they are trailing the lead team. As well as the obstacles of the course the players also had things thrown at them by the rest of the team members. The first player to complete the course, sit on their respective pyramid, and step on the buzzers (the same method of signalling as in the question rounds) and be joined by their teammates won the grand prize. Of the other two teams, the team with more points received a second-place prize, and the team with fewer points received a third-place prize.

In the second series, the final risk became more elaborate. During the obstacle course, the players in fancy dress would have to pick up a block, and press a button. Once they had done this, it released their two teammates who would have to obtain the other two blocks. One of these required climbing up an inflatable cone, on a revolving part of the stage and surrounded by moats of gunge, and the other was hidden in the gunge itself. The first team to acquire all 3 blocks and place them together would be the winner.

In later series the teams were reduced from 3 per team to 2, and the format of the "Final Risk" also changed. Whilst the obstacle course was maintained, at the end of it the team member in fancy dress would hand over to their teammate in normal uniform, and they would have to climb up a large inflatable slide next to the moat of gunge, whilst gunge was dropped on them from above. On reaching the top of the slide, they would raise a flag (signalling victory) then slide back down in to the moat of gunge at the bottom.

At first contestants wore uniforms consisting of grey T-shirts with the "Run the Risk" logo on the back, in either red, yellow or blue depending on what team they were in, and blue shorts. In later series' the T-shirts were changed from being grey to predominantly in their team colour, again with blue or black shorts.

== Celebrity Specials ==
Every Christmas, celebrity Specials were held. These normally consisted of one episode where the teams were made up of a mixture of Celebrities and children, and one episode where all of the teams were made up of celebrities. The celebrities were usually Children's Television presenters, Soap stars or up and coming Pop Stars. Some of the celebrities who appeared included:

1992

- First Episode: Rachel Victoria Roberts, Lindy Ann Barras and Kristian Schmid
- Second Episode: Teams from Blue Peter, CBBC and Brookside

1993

- First Episode: Andrea Boardman, Paul Leyshon and Debbie Gibson
- Second Episode: Teams from EastEnders, Gladiators and Maid Marian and Her Merry Men

1994

- First Episode: Diane-Louise Jordan, Tim Vincent, Clare Buckfield, John Pickard, Dean Gatiss and Justin Pickett
- Second Episode: Martino Lazzeri, Matthew Savage and Caryn Franklyn

1995

- First Episode: Toby Anstis, Josie d'Arby, Ant & Dec, Donna Air, Danniella Westbrook
- Second Episode: Paul Nicholls, Suzanne Cox, Katy Hill

== Transmissions ==
Series	Start date	End date	Episodes
1	26 September 1992	10 April 1993	22
2	2 October 1993	16 April 1994	20
3	15 October 1994	31 December 1994	10
4	23 September 1995	19 March 1996	21
5	21 September 1996	28 December 1996	8

== International versions ==
A Swedish version of the show called Rally Planeten was broadcast on TV4 in 1997.
