= Gunge =

Gooey, runny substance used in children's shows

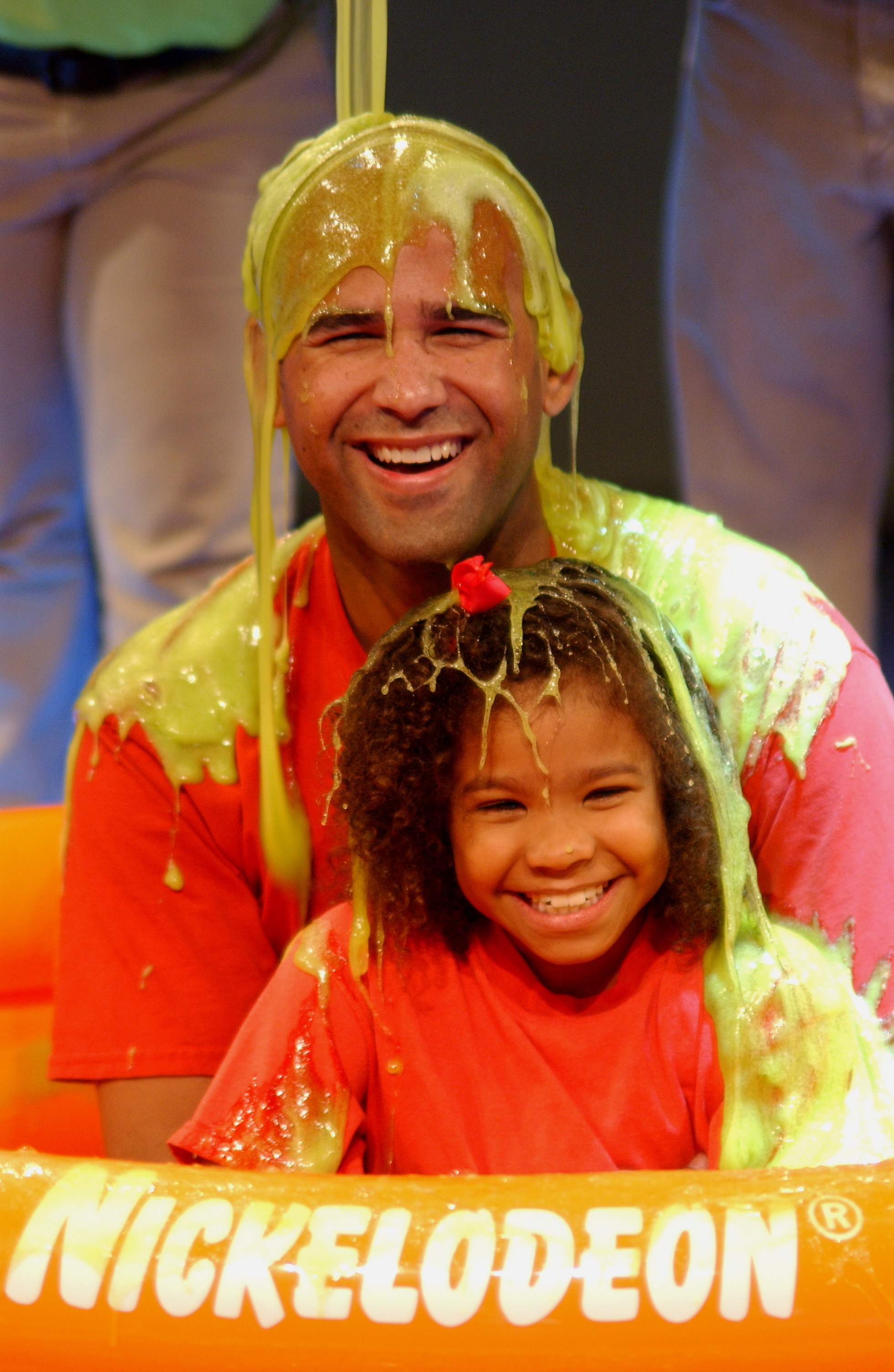
A family gets slimed at Nickelodeon Suite Resort Orlando.

Gunge, as it is known in the United Kingdom, or slime, as it is known in the United States and most other English-speaking countries, is a thick, gooey yet runny substance with a consistency somewhere between paint and custard. It has been featured on many children's television programs around the world for many years and has also appeared on game shows and other forms of programming.

While gunge mostly appears on television, it has also been used as a fundraising tool for charities, youth groups, and religious organizations. Gunge tanks have appeared at nightclubs and community fun days. The British charities Comic Relief and Children in Need, both supported by the BBC, have used gunge for fundraising in the past.

In the United States, slime is often associated with the children's television network Nickelodeon, whose parent company Paramount Skydance has trademarked the word.

== Composition ==
The gunge widely used on television is made from the industrial powder thickener hydroxyethyl cellulose, a commonly used gelling and thickening agent.

The iconic green slime from the Canadian television series You Can't Do That on Television was reportedly developed by accident, according to producer Roger Price. The original idea was to dump a barrel of food leftovers on a young boy chained in a dungeon, but before it could be used, the contents of the barrel had turned green with mold. The mixture was dumped on the boy anyway, and the series gained its trademark gag overnight.

The show later experimented with several slime recipes using ingredients such as lime gelatin dessert powder, flour, oatmeal, Cream of Wheat, baby shampoo, and cottage cheese, though not necessarily all at the same time. On the show, and later on Nickelodeon, the composition of the slime was treated as a closely guarded secret, and some episodes revolved around cast members attempting to discover its ingredients. Marc Summers, host of the network's game show Double Dare, stated that the slime consisted of vanilla pudding, oatmeal, applesauce, and green food coloring.

== History of gunge on television ==
=== 1960s ===
In the UK the popular BBC show Not Only... But Also featured a closing sketch called "Poet's Cornered" in which that week's guest would be challenged to an improvisational poetry contest against Peter Cook, with Dudley Moore acting as referee. Each contestant would sit at the corner of a square tank of "BBC Gunge" on a rigged seat that could be triggered so as to catapult the occupant into the tank. The referee would sit at one of the other corners in a similar chair. Any use of repetition, hesitation or deviation from the challenge theme would precipitate the offender into the tank. The sketch always ended with all three personalities in the tank, chest deep in slime and reciting poetry.

=== 1970s ===
The UK Saturday morning children's show Tiswas used the concept of gunge in abundance. Having already established messy slapstick humour through custard pies and buckets of water being thrown over presenters and guests, Tiswas had taken to locking up adult volunteers into a cage. Once inside the cage, the inhabitants would normally be soaked with buckets of water at random points in the show. Where gunge became involved, was thanks to the tin bath perched on top of the Cage. Through a handle, this tub could be tilted, dropping its messy contents onto the people below, While famous for its custard pie humour, it would not be unusual for Tiswas to have buckets of food and imitation mud/horse manure poured over people. Custard and baked beans were popular choices.

=== 1980s ===
In North America, You Can't Do That on Television, a Canadian children's show popular on Nickelodeon developed by a British TV producer, Roger Price, routinely subjected its characters to "slime" (usually green, but sometimes in other colours), usually when they said, "I don't know." It became a staple of the show where other actors would try to encourage their peers to say a phrase to get them slimed. A sliming scene from a 1982 episode of You Can't Do That on Television was also used in the opening of the 1987 film Fatal Attraction, and references to the series have been used in mainstream U.S. television series ranging from NewsRadio to Family Guy. This aspect of the cult show later became iconized in Nickelodeon's slime logo, subsequent game shows such as Double Dare, What Would You Do?, Figure It Out, and BrainSurge revolving around slime, pies in the face, and other forms of mess, and live events in which participants (including celebrities, particularly at the annual Kids' Choice Awards) would be offered the chance to get slimed or publicly humiliated. In the late 1980s, Nickelodeon and its Canadian counterpart, YTV, even held write-in contests in which the grand prize was a trip to the YCDTOTV set in Ottawa, Ontario, to be slimed. The popularity of Nickelodeon's slime shows spawned imitators such as the short-lived 1988 syndicated game show Slime Time (no relation to Nickelodeon's later Slime Time Live), in which schoolteachers were the victims of green gungings.

The most famous instances of the said sliming tradition opens in 1987 with the first Kids Choice Awards.

In Britain and other parts of Europe, in the early 1980s, children's gunge-based game shows were the norm. Particularly shows like How Dare You! on ITV and Crackerjack on the BBC ensured that the gunging element featured on shows for the decade to come. On How Dare You!, one of the main games was 'Teach Them a Lesson', where children got the opportunity to drench their teacher or representative from their school in gunge while sitting above a knee deep filled gunge tank. After this game the teachers were sometimes knocked off their perch by one of show's presenters and into the gunge tank. On Crackerjack, the two weekly celebrities, one male and one female, would compete against host Stu Francis in a gunge based gamed called "Take A Chance" to try to win points for their child contestant. Failure to answer questions correctly would lead to Francis and/or the celebrity guest being covered in gunge. Additionally, sometimes the winner would get gunged regardless as punishment for laughing at their opponent, especially if it was Francis.

Later in the 1980s, the BBC launched Double Dare, based on the US style format, but much sloppier than its U.S. counterpart. Also, gunge started to appear on mainstream shows such as Game for a Laugh on ITV and Noel's Saturday Roadshow on the BBC. Other countries in Europe also started to have gunge elements on mainstream shows. Un, dos, tres... responda otra vez on TVE in Spain often had contestants throwing buckets of gunge at each other. Also, Donnerlippchen, a television show in Germany, had many messy games; the climax of the show was dunking the team's suited boss in a dunk tank and pouring custard down inside every team members pair of boxer shorts.

The New Zealand children's show What Now has used gunge over the years since its launch in 1981. As of 2015 the show is still broadcasting on channel 2 each Sunday morning from 8 am. Various segments of the show using gunge include, tank of terror, gunge on the run, flushed away, frog in the bog and brain freeze.

=== 1990s–2000s ===
In Noel's House Party, the public often voted to determine which celebrities on the television show would be gunged in the Gunge Tank. In later years, the Gunge Tank became a Car Wash and then the Gunge Train, and celebrities were forced to take a ride on the train and were covered in gunge throughout their journey. Celebrities usually returned into the houses huge fireplace with their suits or dresses ruined and faces unrecognizable. Sometimes audience members were gunged on the show for reasons of revenge by family members or friends.

The entertainment factor attached to the process of gunging was realised by the producers of the charity event Comic Relief, who held an event, in cooperation with the Guinness World Records at the National Exhibition Centre, Birmingham where an attempt to set a record for the Most People Gunged Simultaneously took place on 12 March 1999. 184 gallons of gunge was splattered over 731 people.

All across Europe television producers were ordering more gunge segments to be fitted into mainstream television shows due to its popularity with viewers. In Germany, on Sat.1, Halli galli, Glücksritter (RTL), Glücksspirale, plus the German version of NHP - Gottschalk's Haus-Party, all involved a high dose of gunge. Halli Galli had audience members plucked out of their seats and sent down a messy gunge slide and into a pool. Likewise, Glücksspirale on SAT1, Glücksritter RTL and Rache ist Süß Sat1, had contestants plucked out of the audience and gunged in the most spectacular ways.

Towards the end of the 1990s, with the demise of Noel's House Party and the dwindling audience figures for other European shows, the gunge segment in many mainstream shows started to fade.

Throughout the 1990s, gunge became a focal feature in many children's television shows. Teenagers and celebrity guests are often seen competing in quizzes on Live & Kicking, and are gunged if they lose. Celebrities Lee Ryan, Ben Adams, Katy Hill, Lesley Waters, Katherine Merry, Heather Suttie and Victoria Hawkins were gunged on this show. Many other shows used gunge throughout - Fun House, Get Your Own Back, Run the Risk and Double Dare.

From 1997 to 2003, a Canadian show called Uh Oh!, that ran on YTV, featured a punishment system that had the participant go inside a closet sized room and have green gunged dropped on them if their partner was not able to answer the question correctly.

=== 2010–present ===
Gunge continues to feature in 2010 on children's TV in the UK and continuing the trend of the latter half of the 2000s, not as much as it once did. 101 Ways to Leave a Gameshow has used it in its Bonus Round. The host picks a random name and the first person to get the question he asks wrong gets lowered down a pipe and gets gunged. Basilchildren's Swap Shop returned minus the gunge gallery but introducing a new game with a western theme called Gold Rush. In this game, the two winning teams from the previous game (dunk beds) take part in the game set in a mine shaft where the aim is to fill up tubes with liquid sludge by tipping buckets with the slop into the tubes which are hidden (so the children do not know who is winning). At the end the four kids take cover in the now shuddering mine shaft. The winning team then receives gold (yellow gunge) while the losing team were initially covered in brown sludge however later episodes they remain dry.

In New Zealand kids television, What Now introduced a new gungey game the big breakfast and Splat Cave. Fe Fi Fo Yum has a challenge which sees two children go barefoot into a bowl of gunge to collect objects for their teammates such as letters/numbers or other items. The final game also makes use of the gunge bowl, where the last part involves wading in the pool and up a ramp in order to release their captive teammates. In 2014, a few new games such as Use Ya Head, Target Ya Teacher and Small Balls were added to What Now. In addition, the spin-off from Horrible Histories, Horrible Histories: Gory Games involved a physical challenge involving gunge. The three children in the quiz running barefoot across an inflatable collecting "poo" and depositing it in their tanks at the other end. Above the inflatable are three containers - one for each lane of the inflatable, storing gunge which is released at points in the game. A variation of this challenge sees the three contestants again running barefoot along an inflatable lane, in an all play game, throw pies into mouths attached to a bungee cord, in the second series, this has the added difficulty of "Garum sauce" falling onto the inflatable at a random point in the game causing the children to slip and slide thus increasing the difficulty of the challenge. As of series 3 the losing kids would go down a slide barefoot into a vat of brown gunge and have to crawl through it.. The British and Australian versions of Nickelodeon's Camp Orange also features challenges which involve getting gunged. Splatalot (in Dutch Spetterslot), a medieval themed game show, similar to Total Wipeout features gunge/slime is fired at the attackers by the defenders at random points in the challenges as a means to slow down the attackers.

Sam and Mark Big Friday Wind Up has started featuring gunge since 2014. The game was called rotation and two family teams were asked general knowledge questions while a gunge tank is being poured into, if they get the question right they spin and it is the other family's turn to answer a question. The team that is under the gunge when it is full gets gunged.

In 2016, rotation was replaced by another gungey game called Splat in the box. Two family teams were asked general knowledge questions. However many seconds they took to answer the question is however many turns they do on the handle on the box. for example if they took 3 seconds to answer they will have to turn the crank 3 times. if they get a question wrong or run out of time they will have to do the maximum of turns which is 10. A gunge monster was hiding in the box and a certain number of turns will open the box and whichever team is standing in front of the box gets gunged.

7two had a new gameshow with gunge in called Flushed. The losers of the previous round went into a gunge tank and got gunged with purple gunge or "Sludge" as they call it in the show. There were 2 rounds so each episode contained 2 gungings unless there was a tie in one of the rounds so that it was just one gunging.

In terms of prime time television, in the UK at least, gunge has made appearances in the ITV1 game show The Whole 19 Yards where two transparent spheres contained either pink or yellow gunge. In one of the many physical challenges, a contestant had to unscrew the bottom of the sphere of their colour resulting in the gunge falling onto them and the floor below in order to retrieve a key in the sphere, which allowed them to complete the challenge. The Channel 5 version of Big Brother (both celebrity and normal version) features gunge in various tasks and as a way to nominate housemates.

At the 2014 Nickelodeon Kids' Choice Sports Awards, the Legend Award was given to soccer player David Beckham, who was slimed with gold slime rather than the traditional green. Baseball player Derek Jeter, who received the award the following year, was also slimed with a gold color. This tradition has continued with Kobe Bryant in 2016, Michael Phelps in 2017, Danica Patrick in 2018, and Dwyane Wade in 2019, although it did not happen to Serena Williams in 2024. This sliming is notable not only for its unique gold look, but for the overwhelming fashion in which the individuals are covered with slime. Following the merger between CBS Corporation and Nickelodeon owner Viacom to form what is now Paramount Global, the sports division of CBS has produced programs related to the National Football League for Nickelodeon that incorporate the latter network's identity into football games, including the use of green slime.
