= Peter Simon (presenter) =

English television presenter

Peter Simon is an English shopping television presenter and former children's television personality.

== Career ==
Simon is perhaps most famous for presenting the Double Dare (Going Live!) and Run the Risk (Live & Kicking) segments of the popular BBC1 Saturday morning children's shows. Run the Risk, presented by Simon and Shane Richie, was later to become a separate television programme in its own right. Simon also worked on the children's TV show The Friday Zone. In 1997 he interviewed the Spice Girls and Boyzone.

Simon made infrequent television appearances throughout the 2000s, including as celebrity client on Channel 4's The Salon (2003) and as a guest on ITV Play's The Mint (2006). In the early 2000s, Simon toured Butlins holiday parks with a live stage version of Run the Risk.

Simon served as a permanent auctioneer on bid tv, a shopping channel owned by Bid Shopping (formerly known as 'Sit Up Ltd.') from 2000 until April 2014 when the holding company for Bid TV and Price Drop TV went into liquidation making all 229 employees redundant with immediate effect. In November 2011, bid.tv launched a "Peter Simon Limited Edition Hand-Painted Resin Figurine" to commemorate Simon having been a presenter with the channel for 10 years.

Simon briefly joined Gems TV in May 2014 only to leave without explanation in June 2014.

Simon joined the ranks of Ideal World on 3 September 2014.

Simon was suspended from Ideal World in September 2018 following an on-air comment against Polish and Latvians in the UK. He was reinstated one month later.

In July 2023, Ideal World went into administration, ceasing all trading and broadcasting. As a result of this Peter Simon was left without work. However in September 2023, Simon appeared alongside Marina Berry live on the TJC shopping channel. This marked the first time that Simon and Berry had worked together or been seen alongside one another since their roles on Bid TV some 10 years earlier.

Later in September 2023, Ideal World was bought out by TJC, resulting in Simon's return to the channel on Friday, 29 September 2023 at 10am.

== Television ==
- Junior Showtime (Yorkshire Television) – Presenter
- Run The Risk (BBC) – Presenter/Game Designer (1992–1996)
- Friday Zone (BBC) – Presenter
- Double Dare (BBC) – Presenter
- Lucky Ladders (Anglia Television) (Announcer)
- Win, Lose Or Draw (STV)
- Going Live! (BBC)
- Star Pets (BBC)
- Red Nose Awards (BBC)
- Saturday Superstore (BBC)
- Wheel of Fortune (STV)
- Saturday Picture Show (BBC)
- Get Your Own Back (BBC) – Contestant/Guest Host
- Hold Tight (ITV)
- Children in Need (BBC)
- Starstrider (BBC)
- Comic Relief (BBC)
- Eggs and Baker (BBC)
- The Ant & Dec Show (BBC) (1995)
- Scruples (BBC)
- The Movie Game (BBC)
- Ronald McDonald (McDonald's) – Clown character actor for the company
- The Salon (Reality TV series) playing Himself (1 December 2003)
- bid tv – Auctioneer (2000 – 2014)
- Gems TV – Auctioneer (May 2014 – June 2014)
- Ideal World - Presenter (September 2014 – July 2023)
- TJC - Presenter (September 29, 2023 – October 1, 2023
- Ideal World - Presenter (September 2023 - )
