= What's Up Doc? (British TV series) =

- Genre: Children's entertainment
- Presented by: Andy Crane; Yvette Fielding; Pat Sharp; Jenny Powell
- Country of origin: United Kingdom
- Original language: English
- No. of series: 3
- No. of episodes: 102

Production
- Production location: The Maidstone Studios (1992-94)
- Production companies: TVS (1992); Scottish Television (1993-95)

Original release
- Network: ITV
- Release: 5 September 1992 – 29 April 1995

What's Up Doc? is a British children's entertainment show that aired on ITV on Saturday mornings from 5 September 1992 to 29 April 1995. It was hosted by Andy Crane, Yvette Fielding, and Pat Sharp. Jenny Powell replaced Fielding for the final part of the series.

The first two series were produced at The Maidstone Studios before moving to the studios of Scottish Television in Glasgow for the final series.

== Format ==
The series included a variety of characters such as Simon Perry, Colin, Wooly, Billy Box, Baljit, Pasty the Worm, Mister Spanky, Naughty Torty, Gaston, Sam Sam, and the wolves Bro and Bro. What's Up Doc? was designed to promote and feature products created by Warner Bros. in the UK which included video games, movies, tours of their studios, and their vast library of Looney Tunes animated shorts from which the "What's up Doc?" catchphrase was derived, and new animated series; Animaniacs, Batman: The Animated Series and Taz-Mania.

What's Up Doc? made use of the "phone-in" game format made popular by BBC mainstays such as Going Live!. Phone-in games that featured on the programme included Hugo the Troll and Joe Razz. The show was also responsible for the success of Batman: The Animated Series and Animaniacs on terrestrial television. Music was a large part of the show and played a role in launching the careers of music groups Take That, East 17 and Eternal.

What's Up Doc? featured puppet comedian duo Don Austen and John Eccleston as the show's central new puppet characters, a pair of wolf brothers named Bro and Bro who would comically "devour" any celebrity guest on the losing side of the phone-in games.

Despite its initial success, the Independent Television Commission later expressed concerns about the anarchic humour of What's Up Doc? which was often considered insensitive for a Saturday morning children's programme. Concerned that Warner Bros. would pull the plug on their involvement with the show, Scottish TV requested that the show's humour be toned down to an acceptable level. The show's producers refused and eventually resigned at the end of the second series, along with many of its cast including Austen and Eccleston who were given a spin-off series, Wolf It, also on Children's ITV.

The third series saw production move to Scottish Television's own studios in Glasgow, but without much of its original cast. A decline in ratings led to the show being cancelled in April 1995.

== Series guide ==
Series	Start date	End date	Episodes
1	5 September 1992	1 May 1993	34
2	4 September 1993	30 April 1994	35
3	3 September 1994	29 April 1995	33

== Episodes ==
This is the episode list of What's Up Doc? episodes that aired on Saturday mornings on ITV. The show lasted for a total of 102 episodes from 1992 to 1995.

=== Series 1 (1992–93) ===
Episode	Broadcast	Guests	Cartoons
01	5 September 1992	Bananarama	Baseball Bugs; Batman: The Animated Series: The Cat And The Claw: Part 1; Taz-Mania
02	12 September 1992	East 17; Gareth Jones; Jason Priestley; Tonbridge Bobcats; Reduced Shakespeare Company	A-Lad-In His Lamp; Batman: The Animated Series: The Cat And The Claw: Part 2; Taz-Mania
03	19 September 1992	Rhythm N' Bass; Neil Buchanan; Greg & Max; Paul Morocco and The EC Big Band	Rabbit Of Seville; Batman: The Animated Series: On Leather Wings; Taz-Mania
04	26 September 1992	Bob Geldof; Crowded House; Nick Hanna; Simon Entwistle	His Bitter Half; Batman: The Animated Series; Taz-Mania
05	3 October 1992	The Farm; Sue Hutton; Kevin Keegan; Haggis McLeod	Rabbitson Crusoe; Batman: The Animated Series: Be A Clown; Taz-Mania
06	10 October 1992	Take That; Dr. Bruce Fogle	Fast And Furry-ous; Batman: The Animated Series: The Forgotten; Taz-Mania
07	17 October 1992	TLC; Hank Marvin; Greg & Max; Gladiators	Putty Tat Trouble; Batman: The Animated Series; Taz-Mania
08	24 October 1992	Lindy Layton; Mike Read; Chinese State Circus; Dr. John Brackenbury	Foghorn Leghorn; Batman: The Animated Series: The Last Laugh; Taz-Mania
09	31 October 1992	Go West; ACU Youth Action; David Manning; Chloe Sayer; Roberto Ruiz; Tiburcio Soteno	Stork Naked; Taz-Mania; Batman: The Animated Series
10	7 November 1992	Rage; Greg & Max; Linda Strath; Ronnie McCann; Mark Stewart; Sarah Jane Stringer; Andrew Mitchell	This Is A Life?; Taz-Mania; Batman: The Animated Series: Two-Face: Part 1/Part 2
11	14 November 1992	Pasadenas; The Electro Acoustic Cabaret; Paul Spooner	Sahara Hare; Taz-Mania; Batman: The Animated Series: Two-Face: Part 3/Part 4
12	21 November 1992	Kylie Minogue; Keith Fields; David Manning; Paul Mungo; John Eccleston	Hyde And Go Tweet; Taz-Mania; Batman: The Animated Series: As Told By Batman
13	28 November 1992	Undercover; Cal McCrystal; Paul Simons; Greg & Max; John Eccleston; Kevin Brady	Water, Water, Every Hare; Taz-Mania; Batman: The Animated Series
