= Dave Benson Phillips =

British television presenter

- Born: 3 February 1965 (age 61)
- Occupation: Children's television presenter
- Years active: 1981–present
- Notable work: The Fun Song Factory

Dave Benson Phillips (born 3 February 1965) is a British entertainer, comic, children's television presenter and wrestler. He has presented Playhouse Disney (1998–2006), Fun Song Factory (1994–1999), and the CBBC game show Get Your Own Back.

== Career ==
Benson Phillips became interested in showbusiness while working as an usher at the Polka Children's Theatre in Wimbledon, London, and began his career as an entertainer by busking and performing at children's parties. He subsequently went on to work for Pontins as a Bluecoat, and a Children's Uncle for Haven Holidays. While working at Haven, a talent scout saw him perform, and he was invited by BBC Manchester to audition for Play School. His audition was successful, but the show was pulled out of production shortly after he signed the contract; however, it was recommissioned as Playbus (later renamed to Playdays), which ran for nine years.

In 1991, he began presenting Get Your Own Back, which was shown on BBC One (and later CBBC) between 1991 and 2003, and was a game show consisting of one child contestant and an adult (such as a relative or teacher) who, in the child's eyes, had done something unreasonable, and for which the child wanted revenge. In 1999, the show was nominated for a BAFTA. From 1996 to 1998, he presented Wake Up in the Wild Room on ITV.

Since May 2012, he has co-hosted Let's Rock The Moor! annually alongside fellow broadcaster Pat Sharp. During the summer, he appeared as a panelist on Big Brother's Bit on the Side on Channel 5.

In 2013, Benson Phillips made a guest appearance in Sooty. He plays himself in a mockumentary webseries called Getting Back with Dave Benson Phillips, which began in 2017. The series was invited to showcase at MCM Comic Con London and the cast includes Pat Sharp and Ewen MacIntosh. The series and spin off In Production are available to watch on YouTube. He has most recently been seen working as a professional wrestler, after having also done so whilst working as a blue coat at Pontins.

== Death hoax and other online attacks ==
In 2009, Benson Phillips was the victim of a hoax which claimed that he had died in a car crash. There were other false rumours that he was presenting on a soft porn TV sex line, and that he was no longer being hired because he had suffered a nervous breakdown. In 2017, he spoke with the Chair of the Culture, Media and Sport Select Committee on an inquiry into fake news.

== Personal life ==
On 11 July 2024, Benson Phillips announced that he had type 2 diabetes.

== Filmography ==
- A CBeebies Christmas Carol
- Big Brother's Bit on the Side
- Bitesize (Himself)
- Bad Robots
- Cats' Eyes
- CBBC's Proms in the Park
- Celebrity Juice
- Come Dine with Me (Himself)
- Da Bungalow Clips' 2021 Christmas Day Video Message
- Dream Street
- Fun Song Factory
- Get Your Own Back
- Getting Back with Dave Benson Phillips
- Go For It!
- Is That A Fact?
- Jack in the Box
- The Last Leg
- The Legend of Nic and Joe
- Nick Jr.
- Petswap
- Planet Cook
- Playdays
- Playhouse Disney UK (Presenter)
- Q & A
- Rat Kan II
- Sooty
- Wake Up in the Wild Room
- Words & Pictures – The Gruffalo Story

== VHS videos and DVDs ==
- A Day Full of Surprises and Songs – Presenter
- Bourne Leisure Health and Safety Film
- Dave and the Animals;;
- First Bible Stories
- Fun Song Factory
- Get Up and Go!
- Get Your Own Back
- Makaton Nursery Rhymes
- My Favourite Nursery Rhymes
- Roald Dahl – The Enormous Crocodile – Narrator
- The Magical World of Animals
- Wiz Waz's World of 123
- Wiz Waz's World of ABC
- Wiz Waz's World Nursery Rhymes
- Wiz Waz's World of Starting School
- Wow! That's What I Call Nursery Rhymes

== Video games ==
- Smarties: Meltdown (2006) – Voice of "Big Blue"
