= Emma Ledden =

Irish broadcaster and model

- Born: 1977 (age 48–49); Ireland
- Occupations: Author, Television presenter, Model, podcaster, Business Coach.
- Notable work: The Presentation Book
- Television: The Den, Live & Kicking, MTV News, Select MTV, Top of the Pops
- Website: http://www.emmaledden.com

Emma Ledden (born 1977) is an Irish author, television presenter, model and writer. She began her television career on Raidió Teilifís Éireann's children's strand The Den, before joining MTV Europe as its first Irish presenter.

Born in Cork, Ireland, Ledden is a former presenter of the BBC One Saturday-morning children's television programme Live & Kicking, which she left in 2000. She has also presented The Dancefloor Chart Show, MTV News, Select and Weekend Edition on MTV Europe.

Ledden currently runs her own communications company, Presenting to Sell. She works for LinkedIn as a Learning and Communications Consultant. In 2009, she was the main judge for the TV3 series Total Xposure. In 2013, she published her first book, The Presentation Book: How to Create It, Shape It and Deliver It. She followed that up with The Communication Book: How to Say It, Mean It, and Make It Matter in 2014.

In February 2021, Ledden launched her first children's book, My Mammy Knows Everything, an homage to all mothers juggling life. In April 2021, Ledden launched her second children's book All the Rainbows Colours, a book that gently introduces culture and diversity to young readers.

Ledden presents a podcast called ‘Finding Your Pink’.

== Personal life ==
Ledden lives in Dublin with her husband and two sons.
