= Don Austen =

English puppeteer

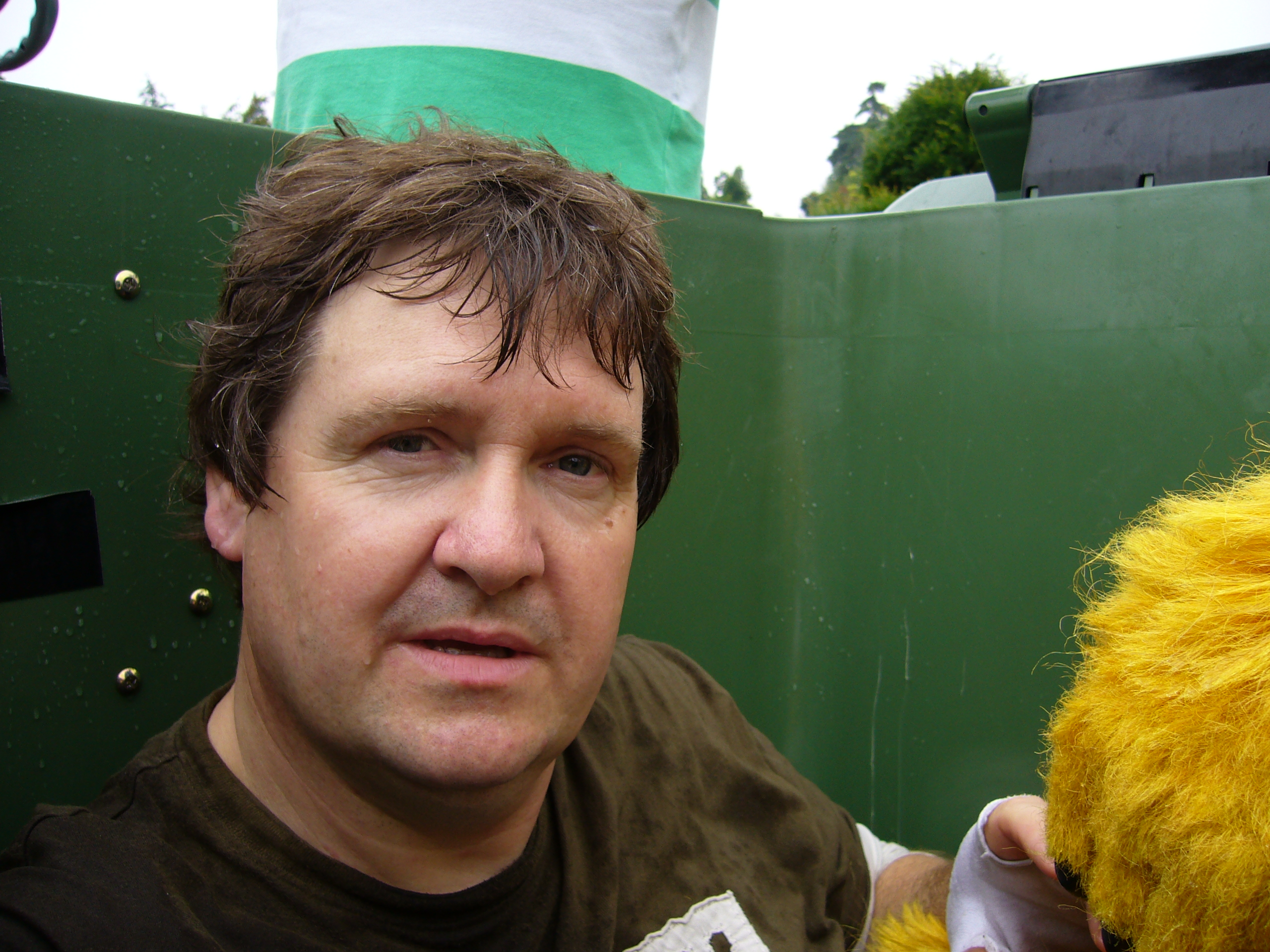
- Born: 19 January 1958 (age 67); England, U.K.
- Occupation: Puppeteer
- Notable work: Santa Claus: The Movie, The Little Shop of Horrors, Who Framed Roger Rabbit

Don Austen (born 19 January 1958) is an English puppeteer. Austen joined the Jim Henson Creature Shop in 1986 for the movie Labyrinth. He was a puppeteer for other blockbuster movies including Santa Claus: The Movie (1985), The Little Shop of Horrors (1986), Who Framed Roger Rabbit (1988), The Bear (L'ours) (1988), The Witches (1990), and Star Wars: Episode I – The Phantom Menace (1999).

Most notably he performed in The Muppet Christmas Carol (1992), inside both the Ghost of Christmas Present and The Ghost of Christmas Yet to Come. He also managed briefly to boost numbers in Muppet Treasure Island (1996) as Pirate Crew and Cannibals.

== Career ==
Austen's British TV debut was on the irreverent cult ITV puppet show Spitting Image. (1987–90)

Austen voiced and puppeteered Sky One's DJ Kat for more than 2000 award-winning DJ Kat Shows (1989–95) and 200 breakfast shows as Earl E Bird on Channel 4's Early Bird (1991).

Austen voiced/puppeteered feline gang leader Danny Mogg (1991) in comedy drama series The Wild Bunch. This TF1/Channel 4 co-production, recorded at AB Studios Paris, was a vehicle for French TV star Dorothee.

During ITV's Saturday morning show What's Up Doc? (1992–94) Austen teamed up with John Eccleston to write and puppeteer a run of British TV favourites. Firstly, The Wolves, aka Bro & Bro, and within weeks earn their own spin-off comedy drama Wolf It! (1993–96) for four seasons.

Austen and Eccleston joined BBC One's Saturday morning 3hr flagship Live & Kicking (1995–2000) as cantankerous Leprechauns Sage & Onion – built by Darryl Worbey Studios – while that other Irish phenomenon, Riverdance, packed houses in London's Theatreland. As Mr. Sage, sporting a rather dodgy hairpiece, Austen wrote and puppeteered comedy sketches for five years. Outliving three sets of in vision presenters, he became the longest surviving 'presenter' (Eccleston took time out to perform Rygel in the sci-fi series Farscape).

To cover Eccleston's sojourn an overbearing long lost sister joined the cast. 'Shamrock' was puppeteered by Rebecca Nagan. This series, hosted by Zoe Ball and Jamie Theakston, won a BAFTA in 1999. The Leps, as they were affectionately known, guest-starred on a wide range of British TV shows including The French and Saunders Christmas Special: The Making Of Titanic (1998), Jim Davidson's The Generation Game (1998), The National Lottery (1998), and GMTV for St. Patrick's Day Celebrations (1998 and 1999)

During 1999, Austen was hand-picked by master puppeteer Frank Oz to help him portray Yoda in Star Wars Episode I: The Phantom Menace. For this complex puppet, Oz needed three helpers, including Austen, David Greenaway and Katherine Smee.

Next was a return to the Henson fold, and all 250 episodes of BAFTA winning TV series The Hoobs (2000–02). Here he voiced and puppeteered the excitable, vulnerable purple Hoob, Iver, alongside Eccleston as Groove. The production was the largest ever pre-school commission by a UK independent. It gained Gemini Award nominations for three consecutive years, "Best Performance in a Pre-School Series." (Shared).

Austen's penchant for live TV was seen again, year round, on the Saturday morning ITV series, Ministry of Mayhem (2005) voicing and puppeteering Scratch – one half of riotous duo The Hyenas, Scratch & Sniff, a third Austen-Eccleston collaboration.

MOM changed its format and was renamed Holly & Stephen's Saturday Showdown (2006), retaining presenters Holly Willoughby and Stephen Mulhern from the previous outing. Scratch featured largely in the slimmed down line up. Austen was also called upon to write and voice the game commentary to 'Supermarket Sneak' and, further to his portrayal of Ozzy Osbourne on MOM, performed in vision as Igor, a larger than life dancing Russian Cossack.

Austen notched up 6 series as voice and puppeteer on CBBC's Basil Brush Show (2002–2007) playing evil Cousin Mortimer and naughty nephews Bingo and Bungo. The show was shortlisted for a BAFTA in 2006. Basil & Bingo performed at Buckingham Palace for the Children's Party at the Palace (2006).

Austen puppeteered Wooly the Sheep in the Woolworths TV/radio commercials (2003–08) with Eccleston as sidekick Worth the Dog. The ad campaigns were shot in London and Prague.

The Hyenas recorded 15 gameshows for Granada Kids – CITV (2006)

In 2006, Austen and Eccleston worked on a pilot for MTV.

In 2007 The Leprechauns returned for the Christmas Puppet Special of the BBC's The Weakest Link. They were voted off after the first round.

In January 2008, Austen and Eccleston were invited to join the newly commissioned Fur TV team for MTV, performing the outrageous puppet characters Fat Ed and Mervin respectively.

In April 2008 International action hero Jackie Chan joined Austen and Eccleston in their latest Woolworths TV commercial.

Austen flew out to Sydney (2010) to join Australian puppeteers on the CBBC, Jim Henson, Sticky Productions, Me and My Monsters. He played the role of Haggis providing the voice whilst inhabiting the enormous orange furball. Colleague David Collins controlled the animatronic eyes from off camera.
