= Get Your Own Back =

British children's game show

- Genre: Children's game show
- Created by: Brian Marshall
- Presented by: Dave Benson Phillips; Lisa Brockwell
- Country of origin: United Kingdom
- Original language: English
- No. of series: 14
- No. of episodes: 190

Production
- Running time: 15 minutes (1991–93); 25 minutes (1994–2003)

Original release
- Network: BBC One (1991–2001); CBBC Channel (2002–03)
- Release: 26 September 1991 – 31 March 2003

Get Your Own Back is a British children's television game show created by Brian Marshall. Each episode staged a contest between teams of children – attempting to score as many points as possible – and their respective adults – attempting to make tasks as difficult as possible for their child contestants – playing a variety of games. The winning child earns a right to get revenge on the adult by ejecting them into a tank of gunge; adult contestants in the show are somewhat embarrassing, for a variety of reasons, to their child counterparts. It ran from 26 September 1991 to 31 March 2003, and was hosted by Dave Benson Phillips. Peter Simon served the role of voice over in 1995.

== Format ==
The show consisted of two teams (the first series had three), each comprising one child contestant and a parent/relative/older sibling/teacher/celebrity (aged 16 to around 70) who in the child's eyes had committed a crime of some sort, for which they sought revenge. The 'crimes' in question were usually trivial, such as singing badly or asking the child to tidy their room. Dave and the audience always showed bias against the adults by booing them as much as possible, and from series 7 till series 10 the adult would come on inside a cage.

=== Main Game ===
Throughout the show, the teams must compete in several games. The exact nature varied over time. It is best remembered that the adults would try to hinder their child to score while wearing inflatable or otherwise comical costumes. However in the first few series it was actually the adults playing for points with the children stopping them (usually by throwing custard pies / gunge at them). A list of games include:

- Poke 'em Off: 2001 - 2002: - Both team members stand on a stool, the child wearing a knight armor with a spear and the adult a dragon costume covered in balloons. The object of the game is for the child to pop as many balloons as possible with the spear, with the one on the tail being worth more than the ones on the body, Each balloon is worth 10 points and the one on the end of the tail is worth 50 points.
- Royal Flush: 2000 - 2003: - On an inflatable castle, the parents are on top, sitting on thrones and having gunge ready. On the signal, the child must bring six nuggets down into a tub. Managing to collect all six nuggets within the allotted time or with no time limit will result in the adult being gunged, in addition to their throne deflating, Each nugget is worth 10 points.
- Surf's up: 1998: The adult is on a surfboard and maintain their balance and has 45 seconds to stay up, The child has to fire beach balls at the adult in order to knock the adult off by using the catapult, if they get the first 15 seconds the child gets 30 points, 30 seconds it's 20 points and the full 45 seconds it's 10 points.
- Good Vibrations: 2001 - 2003: The child has to grab the gold discs from a box and put them on the wall, while the adult sings into the microphone by making the wall shake and the gold discs fall off the wall, each gold disc of worth 10 points.
- Toast Terror: 1997 - 2001: The child has to grab an egg soldier crash through the toast tunnel and put it in the egg cup, Each egg soldier is worth 10 points, The adult is dressed as a chef with the legs bungeed together and move the toast into the tunnel, Each piece of toast bashed through is also worth 10 points.
- Squeal on the Wheel: 1997 - 2003: The adult is strapped to the wheel as the child prepares to throw the balls onto the team coloured section, At the start of the game everybody says "Make them squeal, spin that wheel!", Each ball on the team coloured section is worth 10 points and the middle target is worth 20 points, This reports that it was designed by Andrew Brice.
- Energize: 2000 - 2002: The children have to grab the batteries then run through the course through the drop and put them into the battery holders at the end, while the adults will throwing gunge around and make the drop very slippery, The first child will put all 4 batteries in the right sequence will cover their adult in gunge and win the round, Each battery is worth 10 points.
- Throwing A Wobbly: 2001 - 2002: The children have to tidy their bedrooms grabbing the toys run past the wobbly clowns and put the toys into the toybox, the adults are dressed as wobbly clowns, what the children get for every toy in the toybox is 10 points.
- Gunge Lab: 2003: The children have to grab their test tubes of gunge and run through an inflatable course and put what gunge they have left into the tubes at the end there are 3 colours to make which that yellow and red make orange blue and yellow make green and red and blue make purple, The adults dressed as lab assistants will be spinning the tubes so quickly and they make it very difficult for the children to pick up the tubes and get them to the end, the first child to get all 3 colours mixed correctly will be rewarded with 60 points and they will gunge their adult, Each colour mixed correctly is worth 20 points.
- Feed The Bird: 2002 - 2003: Same rules as Feeding Frenzy except the adult is dressed as a bird and the child has to feed it worms and insects from the nest, while the adult runs from the child to make it harder for the child to feed it, And it's 10 points for every insect that makes it into the beak.
- Shower Power: 2001 - 2003: The children have to collect buckets filled with gunge, they've got to be very careful not to spill it and pour the gunge into the tanks, The 2 adults are dressed in their shower-wear and holding each a ladle to scoop out the gunge, the first child with the most gunge will get to release a shower of gunge all over their adult and each level is worth 10 points.
- Hoopa Scooper: 2000: The children have to pick up their hoops and put them onto the red pole, the adults have to grab their scoopers and throw gunge all over to make it very difficult. Each hoop is either worth 10 points or 20 points in at the start.
- Chocks Away: 1998 - 2002: The child is in the plane and will be throwing bombs on the target, While the adult is also in the plane and be doing some serious running which will make it very difficult for the child to get the bombs on the target, Each bomb on the target is worth 10 points.
- Load the Toad: 1998 - 2000: The child has to throw the flies into the toad's mouth while the adult spins the toad around, The child gets 10 points for every fly that gets into the toad's mouth and it was designed by Alex Connolly.
- D'you Think 'e saw us?: 2001 - 2003: The children have to climb up a Stegosaurus to collect some eggs that are being guarded by the adults that are dressed as cavemen, Once they've collected the eggs they take them back and put them into the leaves the child gets 10 points for every egg that gets into the leaves.
- Mangle Tangle: 2002: The children have to jump up to the washing line grab the washing and put it on, the adults are dressed as washer women and they have to wind the in washing, The children have to be very careful of Dave's smelly socks, For every item of laundry the children get 10 points.
- Bees Knees: 1999 - 2000: The children are dressed as bumblebees and they have to fly around the flowers and grabbing pollen and putting it in the baskets, The adults are dressed as flowers and be doing some serious bouncing, Each bit of pollen is worth 10 points.
- Snow Business: 1999 - 2000: The child is inside the igloo guarding the fish fingers and put them in the frying pan, while the adult is dressed as a snowman and will block the igloo's exits, Each fish finger in the frying pan is worth 10 points.
- Humbug Hullabaloo: 1997: The children have to pick up a sweet from the big of sweets in the center, run through the course and put them into the bowl, The adults are dressed as humbugs and they have to slow the children down, the children get 10 points for every sweet in the bowl and it was designed by Amanda Hampson.
- Chicken and Egg: 1997 - 1999: The children have to get the eggs in the ball pool, once they get them they take them back into the nest, The adults are dressed as chickens and they have to defend the eggs from being taken, Each egg is worth 10 points.
- Motor Mania 1997: Both the child and the adult have remote control vehicles, and the aim is to get to the finish line while the adult tries to intercept the child at a crossroads near the finish line, each attempt is worth 10 points and there are 3 attempts to do it.
- Penalty Shoot-out: 1998: Same rules as Motor Mania except the goal is to kick a football into the goal while the adult plays as a goalie, each attempt is worth 10 points and there are 3 attempts to do it.
- Great Balls of Fire: 1998 - 2003: Named after the song by Jerry Lee Lewis, the children have to collect yellow and blue rocks and put them into the boulder holders while the adults try to throw them back into the volcano, and each rock in the boulder holder is worth 10 points.
- Bag the Swag: 2001 - 2002: The child has to collect items like jewels and gold and place them in a safe while the adult dressed as a robber with a ball and chain on and tries to steal them by using the bag of swag, each jewel is worth 10 points.
- Rob the Spider: 1998: The child has to crawl through the web towards the adult dressed as a spider holding money bags, Once the child grabs a money bag they take it into the treasure chest, Each money bag in the treasure chest is worth 10 points. This was designed by Bethany Stevens.
- Tour de Farce: 2002: The child has to assemble a bike while going across a conveyor belt that is being moved by the adult while cycling, each part of the bike is worth 10 points.
- Polar Explorers: 2002 - 2003: The children have to get on the polar ice pack full of fish, they have to collect the fish and full them into the basket, while 2 very hungry penguins have to eat the fish. Each fish in the basket is worth 10 points.
- Bounce Back: 1997 - 2003: The child starts with 4 discs on this center wall and will be grabbing the discs from the side wall and put them on the center wall, while the adult has to grab the discs from the center wall and putting them on the other side wall, The child will get 10 points for every disc that makes it on the center wall.
- Knight Fever: 1999 - 2000: The children go into the castle and grab the money bag balloons and put them into the team colour barrels, The adults are dressed in their knight armours charging around and bursting the money bag balloons, Each money bag balloon is worth 10 points.
- Wall Ball: 1995 - 1997: The child is sitting at the catapult firing balls at the wall and knock it all down, the adult has to stop the wall from falling off and defend it with the big hands, Each brick knocked down is worth 10 points.
- Petal Power: 1997: The adult is dressed as a flower, The child has to use the ball blaster to knock off the petals, Each petal knocked off is worth 10 points.
- Moving Targets: 1997: The adults are all covered in targets and they have to ride their bikes while the children have to use the ball blasters to shoot the targets off, Each target shot is worth 10 points.
- Lunar Loonies: 1997: The adult is dressed as a spaceman covered in either stars or planets and tied to the bungee ropes and has to bounce around while the child is armed with the ball blaster and has to fire the balls into to knock off either the stars or the planets, The child gets 10 points for either every star or every planet knocked off and it was designed by Margaret O'Neill.
- Mouse Alert: 1997 - 1998: The adult is dressed as a mouse and has to defend the cheese while the child either shoots the cheese by using the catapult or shooting the balls with the ball blaster into the cheese holes, Each ball or piece of cheese through the holes is worth 10 points. It was also designed by Andrew Brice.
- Going Bananas: 1997: The children have to grab the bananas from the tree and put them into the baskets and cross the stepping stones, and the adults are dressed as gorillas will be making the tree spin, For every banana in the basket the children get 10 points.
- Barmy Broomstick: 2003: Same rules as Chocks Away except the child dressed as a witch or wizard will have to throw frogs into the cauldron, The adult is dressed in a pumpkin and will have to some serious running, for every frog in the cauldron the child gets 10 points.
- Can you Kick it?: 2001 - 2003: The adult is dressed as a goal keeper and has to defend the goals by wearing comedy football boots and comedy goal keeper gloves as the child has to kick the footballs into the back of the net, For every football in the back of the net is worth 10 points.
- Cherry Pickers: 2001 - 2003: The children have to grab as many cherries as they can from the adult's cherry cupcake bodies and put them into the basket, The adults have to come up to the cherry tree and replace the missing cherries with these on the tree, Every cherry in the basket is worth 10 points.
- Spider Collider: 2001 - 2003: The child has to grab the flies from the web and has to put them onto the sticky lollipop while the adult is dressed as a spider and has to throw the flies all over the place, The child will get 10 points for every fly on the sticky lollipop.
- Give the Dog a Bone: 1998 - 1999: The children have to race into a ball pool and collect bones and put them into the dog bowls, Guarding the bones are 2 adults dressed as dogs, Each bone in the dog bowl is worth 10 points. This game was designed by Michael Gale.
- Tidy Up: 1996 - 1999: The children start off by tidying their bedrooms by chucking rubbish through the bottom windows, The adults have to chuck the stuff through the top window, Each item of rubbish is worth 10 points.
- Chuck a Duck: 1999 - 2000: The children have to race to the bath tub and grab the ducks and put them through the bottom window, The adults dressed in their outfit with flippers and throw the ducks through the top window, Each duck left through the bottom is worth 10 points.
- Rocking Reindeer: 1998: Same rules as Surf's up except The adult is on a sleigh and maintain their balance and has 45 seconds to stay up, The child has to fire Christmas puddings at the adult in order to knock them off by using the catapult, if they get the first 15 seconds the child gets 30 points, 30 seconds it's 20 points and the full 45 seconds it's 10 points.
- Weird Washing: 1998: The children have to hang items of washing on the washing line, The adults has a fence attached to their backs and they have to jump up and down to make it very difficult for the children to hang the washing on the line, Each item of clothing is worth 10 points. And it was designed by Helen Kirwan.
- Creepy Crawlers:1997: The children have to grab the red swat blocks and put them on the wall by creeping and crawling but watch out the adults the adults are tied to the post wearing blindfolds holding a swatter once they swat the child they deduct 10 points, However, for every swat block on the wall the child gets 10 points without being swatted.
- Beat the Keeper: 1997: The child has to kick the footballs into the back of the net, The adult is dressed as the goalkeeper and has to defend the goals, Every football in the back of the net is worth 10 points.
- Batty Bikes: 1998: The children are on their bikes and armed with lances and they have to pop the balloons on the adult's bikes, Each balloon popped is worth 10 points.
- Barmy Breakfast: 1997 - 1998: The child has to run through either the channel of salmon or the tunnel grabbing a bit of breakfast and put them onto the plate, while the adult will either rock the tunnel or sling the salmon by trying to get in the way of the child, Each bit of breakfast on the plate is worth 10 points and it was designed by Cindy Burton
- Rock the Boat: 2002 - 2003: The child has to grab the coins from the treasure chest and put the in the secret pockets from both the bow and the stern of the boat, the adult dressed as a pirate will have to rock the boat and make it very difficult for the child to get the coins in the pockets, for every coin in the pockets the child gets 10 points.
- Shrimp on the Barbie: 2001 - 2003: The children are dressed as Australian chefs and they have to throw the shrimps on the barbecue grill, The adults are dressed as kangaroos and will have to catch the shrimps and put them into their pockets, each shrimp on the barbecue grill is worth 10 points.
- Slam Dunk: 1997: The children have to balance across the stepping stones and then put the basketballs into the nets, The adults have to do some serious bouncing to knock the child off, Each basketball is worth 10 points.
- Slam Dunk 2000: 1998: The children have to balance across the stepping stones and then put the basketballs into the nets, The adults are dressed as the basketball nets and be moving around, Each basketball is worth 10 points.
- Dodgy Diner: 2003: The children have to start by grabbing milkshake trays run very quickly and the put the milkshake onto the tables, Look out for the adults because they'll be throwing the food around the make the children spill the milkshakes, For every milkshake left standing is worth 10 points.
- Smash and Grab: 1997: There are 3 coloured eggs on the table, the first egg is red, second is yellow and third is green they match the traffic lights over yonder, The adult has to look at one of the lights that matches the coloured egg on the table and grab it before the child smashes it with this hammer, There are 5 attempts and for every coloured egg smashed is worth 10 points
- Feeding Frenzy: 1997 - 2000: The adult is dressed as a giant baby and the child has to feed it food from a bowl, while the adult runs from the child to make it harder for the child to feed it each bit of food in the baby's mouth is worth 10 points.
- Bouncing Blockade: 1996: The children have to start over the course through the poles then the first set of holes over the triangle another set of holes through the adults dressed as sumo wrestlers through the mangle and knock the targets and finally back they come the first child to knock the last target will be rewarded with 100 points and the second child gets 50 points.
- Dog Fight: 1996: The adults is dressed as a pilot in the plane and defend 10 targets by ducking, diving, bobbing and weaving, The child has to use the ball blaster to knock the targets off, For every target knocked off is worth 10 points.
- Bump 'n' Burst: 1996: The children are on their bikes and there are 6 pods on each bike, The adults are also on their bikes all armed with lances and they've got to break the pods, For every pod safe and not broken the child gets 50 points but if all 6 get broken the child gets no points.
- Bubble Breaker: 1996: The child is dressed as a prickly raspberry and has to pop some bubbles, The adult has to take the bubbles into the pool and had a ball and chain with feet tied together, The child has 100 points at the top of this game but should there be any bubbles left inside the pool 10 points will get taken off.
- Over The Top: 1996: The adult has to use the catapult and fire 10 balls over the wall, the child is wearing a pair of clown's shorts and has to catch the balls if they do catch all 10 balls they get the full 100 points and it's 10 points for every ball caught in the shorts.
- Trolley Dash: 1996: The child is on a trolley and has to knock down the targets and the adult has to do some pushing by running around and do 3 circuits, The child gets 10 points for every target knocked down in the quickest time.
- Parrot Perch: 1996: The adult is dressed as a parrot on its perch and the child has to knock the parrot off the perch, there are 10 attempts to knock off the parrot and the child starts with 100 points.
- Dodge the Splodge: 2000: Dave asks the questions each question is worth 10 points and then at the end of the round the scores are being totaled up and taken away from the team total.
- Know your Foe: 1999: Dave asks 3 questions if the adult gets 2 or more questions wrong then they will wear the shower cap of shame.
- Road Works: 1995 The child has to run up the course with a spear in the hand then head to the end and grab a toffee apple and head back to the course, The adult will be slowing the child down and pit sticky tape in the way, Each toffee apple that makes it back is worth 10 points
- The Chicken And The Egg Game 1995: The child has to take the eggs and put them in the baskets (all provided) and run through the tunnels and the adult is dressed as a chicken will be stealing the eggs and run through the outering and through the tunnels, Each egg in the basket is worth 10 points.
- Pest Control: 1995: The children have to push down the red rabbits and the blue moles into the holes, the adults down below have to try and push them back up with their mallets each rabbit or mole in the hole is worth 10 points.
- Crash Zone: 1995: The children have to race on their bikes and collect the footballs and put them on the front of the bikes then they head to the crash zone and the adults have to smash into the children and knock the balls away and the children will have to go around and collect another ball, however if the children managed to make it through they put the balls into the nets each ball in the net is worth 50 points.
- Baggy Trousers: 1995: The child has to drop the balls into the river while the adult is dressed as a clown and has to catch the balls each ball in the river is worth 10 points.
- House of Fun: 1995: The child takes a bucket of sand into the house of fun and the adult uses a bulldozer to nudge the sand the child gets 10 points for every level of sand.
- Coconut Sumo: 1995: The child has to start by choosing an archway then run through the obstacle course all the way to the other side and collect a coconut and bring it back and put it in the shy, the adult is dressed as a sumo wrestler to slow the child down, Each coconut in the shy is worth 10 points.
- Puzzle Time: 1994: There are 2 different puzzle time games one of them is the labyrinth and the other is the building game, in the labyrinth game there are trolls to find and in the building game there are 3 monuments.
- Knockdown Bonus: 1994: Child contestants played a quick mini-game, such as popping all the balloons against the clock, If the child completed the task first, they successfully knocked 10 points off their targeted adult's score.
- Chumps Challenges: 1991 - 1994: There are lots of different challenges for the chumps and the challengers if the adult finishes first they get the bonus but if the child finishes first the adult gets nothing
- Brain Box: 1991 - 1994: The child has to choose a category for the adult to answer questions while doing some chores when the adult gets a correct answer they get 10 points and race through the mangle where the child is waiting once through the mangle the adult places a thing on the table worth 5 points.
- Video Nasty: 1991: Sometimes played as the 2nd round in the first series, the team have to score as many points as they can on a video game like console. After 30 seconds The adult's score is subtracted from the child's score which will give them a final score total.

=== Final Round: The Gunk Dunk ===
Throughout every series the final round was called the "Gunk Dunk", where the losing adult was always thrown into a pool of colourful, messy gunge. Series 5 introduced a 'forfeit' whereby the losing child had to place their favourite toy in an incinerator; although the toy was not actually destroyed, the concept was later dropped.

==== Series 1-4 ====
The adult has to answer five questions correctly within 45 seconds beginning with a specific letter, but the catch it they are not allowed to give the answers that start with that letter. If they fail to get five within the time, they get gunged, but if they succeed, the child gets gunged and loses the prize however the rule states that all children must be accompanied by an adult, so the adult gets gunged anyway.

==== Series 5 ====
The adult has to answer three questions correctly that contain two multiple choice answers, but there are three types of gunge above them if they get a question wrong, they are snot, yellow school custard and R.A.W. (Really Awful Waste). After answering the three question, the child pulls the gold lever, which drops the adult in gunge.

==== Series 6-11 ====
The adult sits above a pool of gunge and has to answer three questions correctly, but if they get it wrong they get dragged up and away from the gunge so it's the case of you're going down and the child pulls the lever, or presses the button in later series, which will result in them getting dropped into the pool. In series 11, before the adult got gunged, the child got a chance to win a prize by guessing which lever prize hides behind if they get it right they win it but if not they get covered in gunge. Series 7 featured Craig Wilson, a Leeds United supporter from Newcastle and his father. He coined the catchphrase, "marvellous" when he described winning the episode to the delight of his friends and future colleagues.

==== Series 12-14 ====
Both adults sit above a pool of gunge the children have to answer a load of questions correctly, for each question they get right they crank up their adult one level, with the child that scored the most points in the preceding games getting a one level head start for their adult. The first child to get their adult right up to the top that sets off the alarm wins and they get to pull the lever and throw their adult into the gunge.

== Transmissions ==
Series	Start date	End date	Episodes
1	26 September 1991	19 December 1991	13
2	24 September 1992	17 December 1992	13
3	30 September 1993	23 December 1993	13
4	30 September 1994	23 December 1994	13
5	27 September 1995	20 December 1995	13
6	11 September 1996	18 December 1996	15
7	10 September 1997	17 December 1997	15
8	7 January 1998	1 April 1998	13
9	16 September 1998	23 December 1998	15
10	9 April 1999	10 September 1999	13
10	23 August 2000		13
11	5 April 2000	28 June 2000	13
12	29 June 2001	21 September 2001	13
13	11 February 2002	25 March 2002	13
14	11 March 2003	31 March 2003	15
