= Going Live! =

British children's television series (1987–1993)

- Genre: Children's
- Presented by: Phillip Schofield; Sarah Greene
- Starring: Trevor and Simon; Annabel Giles; Phillip Hodson; Emma Forbes; Nick Ball; James Hickish; Mark Chase
- Country of origin: United Kingdom
- Original language: English
- No. of series: 6
- No. of episodes: 179

Production
- Production location: BBC Television Centre
- Running time: 165–195 minutes

Original release
- Network: BBC1
- Release: 26 September 1987 – 17 April 1993

Going Live! is a British children's television series that aired on BBC1 from 26 September 1987 to 17 April 1993. It was presented by Phillip Schofield and Sarah Greene. Other presenters included Trevor and Simon, Annabel Giles, Phillip Hodson, Emma Forbes, Nick Ball, James Hickish and Mark Chase.

In 1988, when the second series started, Greene was hurt in a helicopter crash with her then boyfriend, who subsequently became her husband, Mike Smith. Guest presenters stood in for her including T'Pau's Carol Decker. Similarly, in 1992–93 during the final series, Schofield was starring in Joseph and the Amazing Technicolor Dreamcoat and was unable to present the show. A third presenter took his place. Australian soap Neighbours actor Kristian Schmid took the role but soon left due to problems with his work permit. Various other celebrities who stood in included Shane Richie and Robbie Williams during his Take That days.

Some of the cartoons shown on Going Live! included Spider-Man, Thunderbirds 2086, ThunderCats, The Raccoons, Star Wars: Droids, Muppet Babies, Visionaries: Knights of the Magical Light, Defenders of the Earth, Fantastic Max, Teenage Mutant Ninja Turtles, Attack of the Killer Tomatoes, Dungeons & Dragons, Alvin and the Chipmunks, and The Pirates of Dark Water.

== Show segments ==
=== Double Dare ===
Double Dare was presented by Peter Simon, who would often fall into the Gunge during the final round. It was replaced in later series of Going Live!, first by Clockwise, presented by Darren Day, and then by Run the Risk, which was again presented by Simon. The latter of these shows continued onto Live & Kicking.

=== Growing Pains ===
Phillip Hodson provided 'agony uncle' advice to young callers on diverse and often difficult topics in Growing Pains. The topics ranged from love troubles and general teenage angst, to more severe topics such as child abuse and AIDS, which were uncharacteristically deep issues for a Saturday morning youth programme.

=== Live Line ===
In this segment, the show's producers would arrange for popular musical groups and performers to pay surprise visits to their fans.

=== The Press Conference ===
The big set-piece interview at the end of each programme, featuring questions from both the studio audience and from phone callers. These were often with politicians, high-ranking executives in the BBC, or people who had made a notable achievement (e.g. sports people who had success at the Olympics).

=== The Video Vote ===
This was a phone-in section where the viewing public were encouraged to cast their opinions on the popular music videos of the time, which were then shown according to popularity.

=== Trevor and Simon ===
These two anchormen (who were essentially clowns) provided light-hearted humour and character comedy. Popular characters played by the duo included:

- 'The Sister Brothers', a pair of rogue traders;
- 'The Singing Corner', a folk duo;
- DJ Mick McMac and rave-goer Moon Monkey;
- 'Blimey, that's good!', a parody of television shopping channels;
- The Bottomless Bin;
- The Witch Finders, who appeared every Halloween to enlist members of the studio audience to hunt 'witches' and other evil-doers. This normally ended up with them poking Phillip with sticks.
- Ken and Eddie Kennedy, a pair of jaunty barbers.

They were replaced in series five by Nick Ball and James Hickish, but returned for the last series.

== It Started With Swap Shop ==
Going Live! had their own section on the BBC's It Started With Swap Shop featuring classic clips of the show. It is presented as elevator employees recalling favoured parts of the show.

== Awards ==
In 1992, the show's opening sequence of a "colourbars army preparing to Go Live" was nominated for a BAFTA Award, created by the BBC Design team consisting of Morgan Almeida, Mark Knight and Paul Baguley.

== Transmissions ==
Series	Start date	End date	Episodes
1	26 September 1987	16 April 1988	30
2	8 October 1988	15 April 1989	28
3	23 September 1989	14 April 1990	30
4	22 September 1990	13 April 1991	30
5	21 September 1991	18 April 1992	31
6	26 September 1992	17 April 1993	30
