= Trevor and Simon =

British comedy duo

Trevor Neal (born 1963, Dorchester, Dorset) and Simon Hickson (born 1962, Salford, Lancashire) are a British comedy duo (known as Trevor and Simon or Trev and Simon) and are best known for a family-friendly version of anarchic alternative comedy on BBC1 Saturday-morning shows Going Live! (1987–1993), and Live and Kicking (1993–1997).

== Education ==
Trevor and Simon met as drama students at Manchester University in 1981. Hickson was a year older than Neal. They first encountered each other at the drama department's Christmas show, in which Neal played a squirrel on a skateboard.

In a podcast, the pair recount how comedian Ben Elton taught Hickson Greek tragedy, and their Professor, David Mayer (father of Lise Mayer) introduced them to Rik Mayall and Adrian Edmondson, who had been his students some years before. The Young Ones (written by Mayall, Lise Mayer and Ben Elton) was an early influence.

== Career ==
Neal and Hickson initially performed as a trio together with Phil Dennison. They later appeared as a double act on the Manchester comedy circuit as Devilfishhornclub, performing at the Edinburgh Fringe Festival in 1984, and promising “non-racist, non-sexist humour”.

Following a suggestion by John Hegley, the duo were persuaded to relocate to London from Manchester. Later they were approached by a BBC producer for Saturday Superstore who "said they were looking for a double act to represent the new style of comedy, but for children”. Their appearances on Going Live! would result in the creation of some well loved sketches and catchphrases, such as "Swing Your Pants" (part of their segment The Singing Corner) and the "We don't do duvets" sketch.

Trevor and Simon created a crowdfunded comedy drama podcast, Strangeness in Space. The podcast stars Trevor, Simon, and Sophie Aldred. Strangeness in Space is reminiscent of Red Dwarf, albeit with the pair's trademark absurd humour. The story concerns a fictional pop duo called Pink Custard (played by Trev and Simon) who are stuck in space orbiting the planet Mirth with Sophie (played by Sophie Aldred) and robot L.E.M.O.N as they encounter various bizarre creatures and situations.

== Post-comedy careers ==
Since 2017, Hickson has been the manager of Chelsea and Westminster Hospital's MediCinema, an on-site cinema for inpatients.
