= Smarties: Meltdown =

2006 video game

- Developer(s): EM Studios
- Publisher(s): Koch Media
- Engine: RenderWare
- Platform(s): PlayStation 2
- Release: EU: March 17, 2006
- Genre(s): Platform
- Mode(s): Single player

Smarties: Meltdown is a third person game developed by British company EM Studios and published by Koch Media under their Europress label.

== Gameplay ==
The game is set on a giant Nestlé Smarties shaped factory ship which orbits the Earth. Dr. Soursweet is the main villain in the game, who aims to take over the Smarties factory. The main hero, the character played by the player, is a runaway blue Smartie named Big Blue, voiced by Dave Benson Phillips, who must battle to save the factory and the Smarties.

To do this, Big Blue has to explore the different areas of the factory, saving individual Smarties and killing "Stroopers" - Dr. Soursweet's evil living sugary creations. Big Blue must also find permanent upgrades, which improve various aspects of Big Blue and his "exosuit" (the suit in which he uses to run, shoot and jump). Some of the upgrades include "Choco Ray", which fires a blast of chocolate (with enough blasts, the players can destroy Stroopers), and "Half Chocolate Jacket", which offers temporary protection against enemy fire.

Big Blue's exosuit runs on energy, which needs to be replaced after it is used up. Energy can be used by speeding up his run or by using the upgrades. Destroying Stroopers provides Big Blue with "energy balls". Big Blue has health and up to five lives - medikits and energy cells can also be found and collected.

The game is quite open-ended, with most levels containing large areas with plenty of Smarties to find. The players must collect a certain number of Smarties before having access to the areas, providing a challenge for younger players. There are a few different gameplay styles but these repeat themselves throughout the game. The entire game mostly has a 'platform' gameplay style, but there are some more action/adventure touches to certain parts of the game.

== Reception ==
Reception

Review scores
Publication	Score
Jeuxvideo.com	5/20
PlayStation Official Magazine – UK	1/10

The game received poor reviews. The Official PlayStation 2 Magazine UK gave the game a 1/10, commenting that "to say Smarties: Meltdown isn't a fraction as good as the title suggests doesn't even begin to convey how soulless, ugly and utterly starved of charm this confectionary-themed platform really is". Jeuxvideo.com gave the game a score of 5/20, and criticised the camera controls, as well as the graphics which they called "not pretty at all".
