= Live & Kicking =

BBC children's TV series (1993–2001)

- Genre: Children's
- Presented by: Andi Peters; Emma Forbes; Jamie Theakston; Zoe Ball; Steve Wilson; Emma Ledden; Ortis Deley; Katy Hill; Sarah Cawood; Trey Farley; Heather Suttie
- Starring: John Barrowman; Trevor and Simon; Don Austen; John Eccleston
- Voices of: Mitch Johnson
- Country of origin: United Kingdom
- Original language: English

Production
- Production location: BBC Television Centre (1993–2001)
- Running time: 180–195 minutes

Original release
- Network: BBC1
- Release: 2 October 1993 – 15 September 2001

Live & Kicking is a British children's television series that originally aired on BBC1 from 2 October 1993 to 15 September 2001. It was the replacement for Going Live! and borrowed many of that show's features, such as phone-ins, comedy skits, games, competitions, and the airing of cartoons. Becoming fully established in its second series, Live & Kicking subsequently reached its height in popularity during series four, when it was presented by Zoe Ball and Jamie Theakston; their final episode won a Children's BAFTA. After 8 years, the show ended in 2001.

== History ==
Live & Kicking was conceived as a replacement for Going Live!. It was first broadcast on 2 October 1993 at 9 am on BBC1. The original hosts were Andi Peters, Emma Forbes who had presented a cookery segment in Going Live!, and John Barrowman. For the second series, Barrowman was relegated to hosting the showbiz Electric Circus segment, leaving Peters and Forbes to become the main hosts. He left after one series of Electric Circus to concentrate on acting. Comedy duo Trevor and Simon and Peter Simon, in the Run the Risk segment, were also regulars who had featured on Going Live!. While the first series was not as popular as its predecessor, the second series was more successful.

It was broadcast during the winter months, from September to April, except for the eighth series in 2000/01, when Live & Kicking was broadcast all year round.

New episodes of Rugrats were shown. The series went out opposite ITV's What's Up Doc? but during its third series issues were raised by the ITC, and a number of people left including Don Austen and John Eccleston (Bro and Bro's puppeteers) who defected to Live & Kicking to star as leprechaun brothers Sage and Onion.

Andi Peters decided to leave the programme in 1996, after being offered an executive role at LWT, where he also presented Saturday mid-morning music programme The Noise. Emma Forbes initially planned to continue, but during the programme's summer break she also decided to leave, after finding out she was pregnant.

They were replaced by Zoë Ball and Jamie Theakston, who presented it for three years. According to the BBC, the show's popularity was at its peak during the 1996/1997 series when the show regularly had 2.5 million viewers. Around this time Mr. Blobby, played by Barry Killerby, also appeared on the series.

After three years, Ball decided to move on due to a hectic schedule, and Theakston followed. The final episode hosted by Ball and Theakston later won the show a children's BAFTA award for Best Entertainment show in November 1999.

The show returned in Autumn 1999 with new presenters Emma Ledden and Steve Wilson,. They lasted for one series only. The following October, the programme was completely revamped, with a line-up of four: Ortis Deley, Katy Hill, Trey Farley and Sarah Cawood.

In 2001 the BBC announced the programme would end after 8 years. Hill was replaced by Heather Suttie until 15 September 2001 when the final show aired. It was replaced by The Saturday Show, which continued to be broadcast all year round.

== Format ==
Live & Kicking was a weekly magazine show broadcast every Saturday morning, from late September or early October to April and in Series 8, it was broadcast all year round. It was aimed at young people. It featured music performances, "hot seat" questions for celebrity guests, phone-ins, games, comedy sketches, competitions, and television programmes and cartoons. It used the taglines "Miss it, miss out" and "The only way to start your weekend" on promotional adverts for the show. As well as the main presenters, there were regulars such as comedy duo Trevor and Simon, and later Ben, Gez and Rich from The Cheese Shop and SuperGirly. A segment in the first few series that was an adaptation of Going Live's Double Dare was Run the Risk, a game in which teams of children completed various obstacle courses and challenges. Gunge was often included to make the tasks harder. Run The Risk was later broadcast separately. From 1994 until 2000, there was a showbiz segment called the Electric Circus, which featured the latest films, music, computer games and gossip. It was first presented by John Barrowman after he stepped aside as a regular presenter, and was later hosted by a variety of people.

The first series featured the computerised head of a cat named "Ratz" announcing links, but this was dropped after one series. It was replaced by human announcer Mitch Johnson, who, as well as providing commentary and links for each item, would interact with both the audience and the presenters too. From the second series, two puppet leprechauns, later named as Sage and Onion, became regulars. They were designed and built by Darryl Worbey Studios and played by Don Austen and John Eccleston, who had previously been the puppeteers of the wolves 'Bro & Bro' on ITV's What's Up Doc? They performed comedy sketches throughout the morning, and often interacted with the people in the studio. Another comedy character who first appeared in the third series was Mr Blobby, who had previously appeared in Noel's House Party. Most regular features were dropped for the final series, when the show was revamped. A feature that stuck throughout was the jingle for the phone number, first 081 811 8181, then 0181 811 8181, then 0845 610 1515.

As well as the television show, Live and Kicking launched a music CD, composed of the best music that artists had sung live on the programme. A CD-ROM computer game called Live and Kicking: Showmaker was also released, where the user could combine elements of the show to create their own television production on a small scale. A monthly magazine was also produced, though sales of the magazine dropped significantly towards the end of Live & Kicking's production, reflecting its loss of viewers.

For series five and six, there was a short version of the show that aired on Friday afternoons called L&K Friday, but this was cancelled after two series. The regular Saturday presenters Jamie Theakston and Zoe Ball presented the first series, and Steve Wilson and Liz Fraser presented the second series. A 90-minute version of the show also aired on BBC Choice and was entitled L&K Replay.

In May 2000, two months before Wilson and Ledden officially resigned from Live & Kicking, the show was brought back for a one-off special during the summer break. It was to mix in with the BBC's Music Live and the show was titled as Music Live & Kicking with Wilson and Ledden returning to present along with future presenter Ortis Deley and special guest presenter Stephen Gately of Boyzone. This special was dedicated to a series of music performances (hence the title) and was the first edition to be broadcast in widescreen.

One of the last features was L&K Castaway, a spin-off of the BBC reality show Castaway 2000. Each week, six children would spend four days on a remote Scottish island, learning how to survive, among other skills. Points were earned through passing various tasks, and were lost if contestants entered the "Temptation Hut", which contained various modern electrical appliances.

== Overview ==
Live & Kicking began on 2 October 1993 and saw the introduction of presenters Andi Peters, Emma Forbes and John Barrowman. Trev and Simon also joined them and provided the comedy for the show; both had also been on the former show Going Live! with Forbes.

The computer game for the 1995 series was called Snuffle the Truffles and involved viewers guiding a pig character around a pigpen eating truffles, whilst Trev and Simon invited two guests to review videos in the Video Galleon. The last show before the programme went on a summer break in 1996 saw Peters and Forbes leave the show. The programme returned in September 1996 with the introduction of new presenters Zoë Ball and Jamie Theakston, and an array of new features.

Its return in 1997 saw the replacement of the white set with a new one that maintained the same shape and layout, but was curvier and larger. This coincided with the show moving into the larger Studio 6. This series also saw the introduction of Ben Ward, Richard Webb and Gerard Foster (known as Ben, Gez and Rich) of The Cheese Shop who took over the comedy from 'Trev and Simon'. The computer game for this series became Grabbit Rabbit which involved guiding 'Warren the Rabbit' down a course collecting carrots whilst dodging obstacles such as fences and bushes. Ball later said in an interview that Blake Harrison of The Inbetweeners had told her that he had once been a player on Grabbit Rabbit when he was younger.

In September 1998 Live & Kicking began with the leprechaun Mr Onion being temporarily written out of the show after supposedly being swept down the plughole in the bath. This was done intentionally as puppeteer John Eccleston was in Australia filming for Farscape and would not be available. To compensate for Eccleston's absence, a new leprechaun puppet was added called 'Shamrock' (voiced by Rebecca Nagan of Rosie and Jim fame). On 3 October 1998, future Harry Potter star Daniel Radcliffe appeared in the audience during The Hot Seat item where he proceeded to ask The Chuckle Brothers a question. The final edition before the programme went on a summer break also saw the departure of Ball and Theakston as hosts and featured them both in The Hot Seat being interviewed by Michael Parkinson about their time on the show. This episode later went on to win a Children's BAFTA in November 1999.

Live & Kicking returned in September 1999 and saw the introduction of new presenters Steve Wilson and Emma Ledden. New features were added however unlike previous series, many of them failed to last and were continuously replaced. It also saw leprechaun Mr Onion return, however Shamrock remained meaning the show now had three leprechaun puppets. A new comedy duo called Supergirly were also introduced from January 2000 to fill the gap left by 'Ben, Gez and Rich' who had quit the show the previous series. Supergirly, which consisted of Louise McClatchy and Jai Simeone, (known as Lou and Jai) would feature in sketches throughout the morning as BBC make-up artists who were rude to the guests.

October 2000 saw a number of major changes to the show. The set was entirely revamped with a new layout, new titles were added along with a new arrangement of the theme tune. Mr Blobby, The Leprechauns, Supergirly, Renoir and Mitch had also been removed from the show and unlike previous series, there were now four presenters instead of two: Katy Hill, Ortis Deley, Trey Farley and Sarah Cawood. The programme also saw the introduction of gunge based games. A new game was also introduced on the roof of BBC Television Centre called Sacrifice Your Family (known as Sacrifice Your Friends, from January 2001) which Cawood hosted that put two families against each other in various games.

From 21 April 2001, Live & Kicking saw Farley, Cawood and Deley joined by Heather Suttie who replaced Hill. The last show on 15 September 2001 saw many of the old features and presenters return, including leprechauns Mr Sage and Mr Onion, who acknowledged in the final few minutes of the show that they were the longest serving presenters of the show. The final edition ended with a montage of the series' best moments over a live performance of the Steps song "It's The Way You Make Me Feel".

== Demise and replacement ==
In 2001, it was announced that the programme would end after 8 years. Live and Kicking was replaced by The Saturday Show, fronted by Dani Behr and Joe Mace, which was also shown all year round until September 2003 when it began an Autumn-Spring/Summer loop with Dick and Dom in da Bungalow.

Live & Kicking was featured in the BBC's It Started with Swap Shop programme in 2006, in which Noel Edmonds interviewed the first pair of presenters, Andi Peters and Emma Forbes, about their time on the show.

== Production ==
For the first four series, Live & Kicking broadcast from TC 7 at BBC Television Centre however as of Series 5, it moved next door into TC 6 where it gained a larger set due to it being a larger studio.

Studios TC 6 and TC 7 at BBC Television Centre were demolished in 2015 in the restructure of the building. As such, none of the studios used by Live & Kicking exist anymore.

== After Live & Kicking ==
In 2004, former presenters Katy Hill and Trey Farley, who had presented the show together in Series 8, went on to marry each other at a register office in Surrey before flying to Tuscany to seal their marriage. They later had two children together: a daughter, Kaya Sky, born in 2006, and a son, Akira, born in 2007.

In 2009, Zoë Ball and Jamie Theakston who had presented the programme together between 1996 and 1999, were reunited to present a new game show for Channel 5 called Britain's Best Brain which ran from 28 October to 16 December 2009.
