= Heather Suttie =

Scottish television and radio presenter

Heather Suttie (born 1 October 1974) is a publicist, producer, television and radio presenter.

In 2001, she presented BBC Children's Saturday morning show Live & Kicking. She has written tabloid features on travel, lifestyle, environmentalism, plastic bags, recycled fashion and had a short book and podcasts review in Scotland's Sunday Mail.

Suttie covered Smooth Radio breakfast for Scotland in March 2025.

== Career ==
In 1998, Suttie hosted the children's science programme Hyperlinks and was one of four presenters on ITV2's youth entertainment show when the channel launched Bedrock after auditioning with 767 other hopefuls. From 1994 to 1997, she contributed reviews on Channel 4's Moviewatch.

Suttie's first job, aged 20, was a late-night BBC Scotland music show the Beat Room. In 1997, she hosted an online weekly show from London for the Mean Fiddler Group. From 2000 to 2010, she co-presented festival coverage for T in the Park TV, the Done and Dusted music festival and appeared on MTV Europe From 2001 to 2005, she presented Beat 106's Breakfast Show and drivetime shows from 2001 to 2005. From 2005 to 2008, she presented the drivetime slot on Xfm Scotland along with stintspresenting the supermarket instore radio for the Co-Op supermarket. From 2014 to 2016, she presented a four-part BBC Radio Scotland series The Day I Changed My Life. Suttie's live work included Princess Productions, Done & Dusted, Blink TV, ITV2, BBC1, BBC2 and STV.

Her eco campaigns include ecomunky and Say No To Plastic, with projects with The Daily Record, Aimee McWilliams and Oran Mor, hosting vintage and eco sales from 2007 to 2011. This included promotional features, and appearances on The Today programme and Jeremy Vine on BBC4 and BBC2. The Scottish Government mentioned her ideas on reducing plastic bag waste and campaigning for their 5p plastic bag charge in Scotland.

Voice-over work includes for Tesco in-store radio, monster.co.uk, Clairol, Irn Bru and other radio advertisers.

In the past, she has hosted awards events, including the CIS Excellence Awards (2003–2009), The Evening Times, Property Executive Awards (2007–2009 in Glasgow and Manchester), and a number of events for The Herald newspaper. From 1999 to 2000, Suttie wrote a social diary column for The Sunday Post and from 2000 to 2010, she wrote a weekly clubs column for The Evening Times. In 2018, she began writing book puffs for the Sunday Mail.

Suttie blogged about a year in Tanzania in 2011, working voluntarily with the Chief Buddhist Monk of the African continent.
