= The Hoobs =

Children's television series

- The Hoobs: Hubba Hubba (Blue), Roma (Orange), Tula (Pink), Iver (Purple) and Groove (Green)
- Genre: Children's television series
- Created by: Jocelyn Stevenson; Brian Henson
- Starring: See below
- Theme music composer: Ed Welch
- Composers: CYP; Ken Bolam
- Countries of origin: United Kingdom; Canada
- Original language: English
- No. of series: 5
- No. of episodes: 250

Production
- Executive producers: Steven DeNure; Beth Stevenson; Angus Fletcher
- Producers: Brian Henson; Mellie Buse; Sue Taylor
- Running time: 24 minutes
- Production companies: The Jim Henson Company; Decode Entertainment

Original release
- Network: Channel 4 (UK); TVOntario (Canada)
- Release: 15 January 2001 – 3 January 2003

The Hoobs is a live-action/animated children's television series created and produced by The Jim Henson Company and Decode Entertainment for Channel 4. A total of 250 episodes were produced across five series.

== Plot ==
The series stars five extraterrestrial creatures called Hoobs (Hubba Hubba, Iver, Groove, Tula, and Roma) from the fictional planet called Hoobland, and their interactions with Earth and the human race. In each episode, they try to find the answer to a question to be put in the great Hoobopedia created by Hubba Hubba, back in Hoobland, in hopes of learning all there is to know.

Hubba Hubba remains in Hoobland to await the report from the other Hoobs, Iver, Groove, and Tula live in a music-powered vehicle called the Hoobmobile, and Roma travels to all parts of the world by foot, by public transport and even her music powered motorcycle called the Hooby Picki Picki.

The five creatures are muppets, but the show also includes animated sequences as well as live action footage of human children who explain concepts to the Hoobs.

=== Series ===
A typical episode format involves:

- Hubba Hubba introduces the viewers to the Hoobs stating that he has been tasked to send four of the Hoobs to Earth to gather information for Hoobland. The opening titles roll (a few of the fourth series episodes as well as some of the fifth series episodes have trimmed the introduction before the theme song).
- A preamble during which a question to be answered is stumbled upon.
- Hubba Hubba formalises the task.
- Roma is e-mailed the question in order for her to provide a report.
- Hubba Hubba downloads some pictures or shows videos from HoobNet, relating to the question.
- A line of dialogue with a question or statement ending "who", "what", "when", "where", "why" or "how" causes a cutaway to a Motorettes' performance of that word.
- There is usually a number of songs from the Hoobs or Motorettes, in some cases with familiar lyrics, or a familiar tune.
- The Hoobs visit the Tiddlypeeps (human children) twice, as "they're smart, they're fun, they know".
- One Hoob drives left hand drive or right hand drive, one visits and turns the key and the third may participate in the B-story.
- An animated drawing story from a Tiddlypeep who narrates it is aired, relating to the question. But in the episode "Stories", Tula makes a story herself which Hubba Hubba then puts on HoobNet and gets a Tiddlypeep to tell it.
- Roma reports back to the other Hoobs about the related subject on the Hoobycomputer. But in "Roma's Visit" and "Riddle Me Ree", Groove reports back to Iver and Tula about Roma's Visit and about the riddle for Roma on the Hoobycomputer. But in "Mums and Dads", Iver reports back to Tula and Groove about tiddypeep activities on the Hoobycomputer.
- Various inappropriate solutions are rejected for an answer, just in time.
- Hoob News summarises the adventure then the end credits roll.

=== Other series ===
- Hello Hoobs – The five-minute "Hello Hoobs" segment includes excerpts from the English-language version, edited to function as a teaching tool. Targeted at viewers between the ages of four and eleven, the segment uses the Hoobs to expand English-language vocabulary and explain rudiments of grammar. The stated goal was to teach 400 words and 150 different expressions. The segment airs immediately prior to the half-hour The Hoobs broadcast on a weekly basis, and is compiled into a half-hour weekend broadcast for Southern Europe, to serve as a review of knowledge.

== Characters ==
- Iver (performed by Don Austen) – The purple leading male Hoob figure of the trio who has orange ears. He is very punctual and business-like, but likes to have fun, too. Iver is a great doer, but sometimes he tends to be a bit of a worrier. He is also quite bossy, which often irritates Tula and Groove.
- Groove (performed by John Eccleston in Series 1-3, Mark Jefferis in Series 4 and 5) – The green male Hoob with his green Twizzletuft covering his eyes who is always cool and relaxed, and a little slower than the others. This can result in him making mistakes which frustrate his friends, but he always makes up for this in the end. He is also a little greedy and shy and a bit more hesitant to leave the Hoobmobile. He has a talent for making music, and he enjoys collecting things.
- Tula (performed by Julie Westwood) – The pink female Hoob on board. She is sympathetic, caring and enthusiastic, though she's sometimes a little tiring to have around. Tula is very creative and loves arts and crafts.
- Roma (performed by Gillie Robic) – The orange female explorer Hoob who travels around the world, gathering information for the Hoobopaedia by talking to the Tiddlypeeps. Roma does neither live in nor drive the Hoobmobile, but she frequently reports all her discoveries to Iver, Groove and Tula through video messages. Sometimes Roma visits the Hoobmobile to help them with their questions. Roma drives and rides a motorcycle called a Hooby Picki Picki which is powered by one unnamed Motorette. In some episodes, Roma talks to the Tiddlypeeps.
- Hubba Hubba (performed by Mark Jefferis in Series 1-3 and some episodes of Series 4, Brian Herring in Series 4 and 5) – The blue male leader of the Hoobs. From his home base in Hoobland, he updates the Hoobopaedia with all the info that Iver, Groove and Tula collect during their stay in our world. In the Series 5 episode "The Big Bonk", Hubba Hubba comes to visit the Hoobmobile and talks to the Tiddlypeeps on the Peep Planet and does Hoob News all by himself. Though he did get lost causing the other three Hoobs to enlist Roma to find him. Given his rather eccentric twizzletuft and endless quest for knowledge, it is highly likely that he is some sort of scientist in Hoobland.
- The Motorettes – A race of robotic creatures. Three Motorettes operate the engine of the Hoobmobile by singing and playing musical instruments while one Motorette operates Roma's Hooby Picki Picki by dancing along to the music track.
  - Tootle (performed by Rebecca Nagan) - A female Motorette who is blue cyan/lime green.
  - Timp (performed by Wim Booth) - A female Motorette who is yellow/orange red.
  - Twang (performed by Mark Jefferis) - A male Motorette who is magenta/purple.
  - Unnamed Motorette - This is the other Motorette that is yellow (resembling Tootle, Timp and Twang) and powers the Hooby Picki Picki.
- The Hoobydudu – A robotic primate that hatches from an egg who lives in Hoobland with Hubba Hubba and Auntie Hattie. He changes from being a screamer to being a giggler when he's cuddled and cheered up by either Auntie Hattie or Hubba Hubba.

== Episodes ==
Series	Episodes	Originally released	
Series	Episodes	First released	Last released
1	40	15 January 2001	16 March 2001
2	25	5 May 2001	6 June 2001
3	60	14 June 2001	27 November 2001
4	73	22 December 2001	1 April 2002
5	52	23 September 2002	3 January 2003

=== Series 1 (2001) ===
No. overall	No. in series	Title	Original release date
1	1	"Finding Out"	15 January 2001
The Hoobs set out to learn some new things about "Peeps" (Human adults) and "Tiddlypeeps" (Human children), having just arrived on the Peep Planet.
2	2	"Monkeys"	January 16, 2001
The Hoobs want to give a monkey something to make him happy, but cannot decide what will do the trick.
3	3	"Hello"	January 17, 2001
How Peeps and Tiddlypeeps say hello to their friends.
4	4	"Laughing"	January 18, 2001
The Hoobs try to figure out what causes laughter.
5	5	"Stars"	January 19, 2001
Iver searches for a bright shining star to hang up in the Hoobmobile.
6	6	"Pets"	January 22, 2001
Groove decides he would like some company while out collecting and thinks a pet would fit the bill.
7	7	"Whistles"	January 23, 2001
Tula tries to get Groove and Iver's attention, but they are too busy playing a game to notice.
8	8	"Floating"	January 24, 2001
The Hoobs miss floating on the water in a Hooblebobber. There are no Hooblebobbers on the Peep Planet, but maybe they can find something that floats in just the same way.
9	9	"Dog"	January 25, 2001
The Hoobs investigate why a dog keeps barking outside the Hoobmobile.
10	10	"Running"	January 26, 2001
Groove isn't too fond of running.
11	11	"Getting Better"	January 29, 2001
Iver suffers hot and cold flushes, and his nose and eyelids turn blue and start making a strange sound – so he looks to the Tiddlypeeps for an explanation.
12	12	"Frogs"	January 30, 2001
The Hoobs marvel at how high frogs can jump, and wonder if it is because they eat flies.
13	13	"Losing Things"	January 31, 2001
Iver searches high and low for his Hoobtoobe, but it appears to have vanished.
14	14	"Flags"	February 1, 2001
The Hoobs discover how Peeps use Hoobyhideys. Hoobyhideys are called Flags.
15	15	"Seasons"	February 2, 2001
Groove notices his peep tree has changed the colour of its leaves and wonders whether they will grow back.
16	16	"Bees"	February 5, 2001
The Hoobs had run out of Hoobygoop, but discover the Peeps have a suitable substitute.
17	17	"Fix It"	February 6, 2001
The Hoobs call on their DIY skills to fix the Hoobytug.
18	18	"Homes"	February 7, 2001
The Hoobs discover which animals live in homes similar to theirs.
19	19	"Presents"	February 8, 2001
The Hoobs wonder why Peeps and Tiddlypeeps give each other presents.
20	20	"Hair"	February 9, 2001
Tula tries to brighten up the day by restyling her Hoobyfur.
21	21	"Clapping"	February 12, 2001
Iver, Groove and Tula discover how Tiddlypeeps clap their hands.
22	22	"Smells"	February 13, 2001
Tula needs something to make her smell especially for the Tiddlypeeps' party.
23	23	"Combs"	February 14, 2001
The Hoobs use the Peeps' combs to store their Hoobycookies until they discover what they are really meant for.
24	24	"Keeping Warm"	February 15, 2001
Iver, Groove and Tula find a way to keep warm while Hooblegazing.
25	25	"Rain"	February 16, 2001
The Hoobs discover how and why it rains.
26	26	"Wobble"	February 26, 2001
Groove seeks a wobbly item to complete his collection of things that move.
27	27	"Owning Up"	February 27, 2001
When Tula ruins Groove's best painting, she has to do something before he finds out.
28	28	"Sand"	February 28, 2001
The Hoobs learn about sand and what it is used for.
29	29	"Hooting"	March 1, 2001
A mysterious hooting sound keeps the Hoobs awake at night.
30	30	"Soft Round Flat Things"	March 2, 2001
The Hoobs search the Peep Planet for soft, round, flat things to play with like a Hoobarama.
31	31	"Fish"	March 5, 2001
Iver, Groove and Tula learn about creatures that like getting wet.
32	32	"Keys"	March 6, 2001
The Hoobs discover how keys are used to open things.
33	33	"Waiting"	March 7, 2001
Iver, Groove and Tula had to wait for their Hoobyblubber Tubs to set.
34	34	"Shoes"	March 8, 2001
Iver needs something to keep his hoobypaws dry from a wet puddle of Hoobjuice on the floor which Groove had so far spilled.
35	35	"Flying"	March 9, 2001
The Hoobs find something that can fly.
36	36	"Times"	March 12, 2001
The Hoobs find out about the best time to visit the Tiddlypeeps.
37	37	"Getting to Sleep"	March 13, 2001
Iver is having trouble going to sleep and needs some help.
38	38	"Potatoes"	March 14, 2001
Groove shows off his potato plant, but finds there is just one problem – it does not have any potatoes on it.
39	39	"Mice"	March 15, 2001
A hungry mouse tries to make a meal of the Hoobmobile.
40	40	"Teeth"	16 March 2001
Groove makes an interesting discovery – a tooth stuck in a piece of wood.

=== Series 2 (2001) ===
No. overall	No. in series	Title	Original release date
41	1	"Puppets"	5 May 2001
Iver, Groove and Tula seek a Tiddlypeep souvenir for the Hoobmobile. Note: Postponed from Series 1
42	2	"Angry"	2001
Groove is Tula’s friend – she knows that’s true. But he’s done something to annoy her and now she’s angry. Tula doesn’t want to get angry with her friend – so what can she do instead? Note: Postponed from Series 1
43	3	"Holidays"	2001
Groove needs a break, but cannot decide what kind of holiday would suit him best. Note: Postponed from Series 1
44	4	"Boys and Girls"	2001
Tula thinks boys and girls like different things, but Groove is not so certain. Note: Postponed from Series 1
45	5	"Wind"	2001
Iver watches a feather blowing in the wind and decides it would make a good addition to the Hoobmobile. Note: Postponed from Series 1
46	6	"Getting Bigger"	2001
Groove wishes he were tall enough to reach the tools he needs from the top shelf. Note: Postponed from Series 1
47	7	"Rubbish"	2001
The Hoobs learn how to recycle things. Note: Postponed from Series 1
48	8	"Eggs"	2001
Groove finds a painted egg and wonders what it is for. Note: Postponed from Series 1
49	9	"Planes"	2001
The Hoobs take to the air for a bird's-eye view of the Peep Planet. Note: The first episode to feature a new format of Hubba Hubba and Roma buttons, and also the first episode to feature a disco/pop version of "We're Off to See the Tiddlypeeps".
50	10	"Dreams"	2001
Groove dances underwater with a mermaid – even though he is nowhere near the sea. Note: The first episode to feature a classical/opera version of "We're Off to See the Tiddlypeeps".
51	11	"Spots"	2001
A box of black sticky spots arrives for Tula from Auntie Hattie Hoob.
52	12	"Shopping"	2001
The Hoobs find where to shop to find something to replace a broken Pongaping leaf.
53	13	"Borrowing"	2001
Groove learns about borrowing when the Hoobysandwich hammer is broken. Note: Postponed from Series 1
54	14	"Fancy Dress"	2001
Tula and the other Hoobs are invited to a fancy dress party, but Tula can't decide what to wear.
55	15	"Crying"	2001
The Hoobs try to figure out how they can stop a Tiddlypeep from crying.
56	16	"Bells"	2001
The Hoobs decide to get a bell for Groove so they can keep track of his whereabouts.
57	17	"Sharing"	2001
The Hoobynut in the roof garden is ready to eat, giving the Hoobs the perfect opportunity to learn about sharing.
58	18	"Up And Down"	2001
The Hoobs learn about things that go up and down at the same time.
59	19	"Dancing"	2001
The Hoobs try to learn a Peep dance that will fit their Hoobyjiggle music. The last time the Hoobs danced to Hoobyjiggle music was when they were Hooblets. Note: Features a flashback to when Iver, Groove and Tula danced on the roof garden of the Hoobmobile as Hooblets.
60	20	"Dirty"	2001
Groove falls into a mud puddle and gets covered in mud, so Iver and Tula try to find a way to get him clean.
61	21	"Juiciest Fruit"	2001
Groove ate Tula's apple tower and sets out to make it up to her by finding the biggest, juiciest fruit.
62	22	"High Up"	2001
The Hoobs enjoy the view from the roof garden of the Hoobmobile and wonder what it would be like to be much higher up.
63	23	"Cows"	2001
The Hoobs reveal their favourite things about cows and Groove tries to make cheese.
64	24	"Shy"	2001
Iver and Tula help Groove calm his nerves before a musical performance.
65	25	"The Band"	6 June 2001
The Hoobs want to play their favourite Tiddlypeep music, but first have to work out what all the instruments are.

=== Series 3 (2001) ===
No. overall	No. in series	Title	Original release date
66	1	"Circus"	14 June 2001
The Hoobs are trying to think of a way to run a circus act. Note: The first episode to introduce new video clips from the Series 2 episodes for the opening and closing titles, including Roma's report from the penultimate episode of Series 1 and the disco/pop version of "We're Off to See the Tiddlypeeps" from Series 2.
67	2	"Upside Down"	2001
Tula paints a mysterious picture, and the others cannot decide what it is.
68	3	"Rings"	2001
Iver, Groove and Tula celebrate a special day but realise they have left something important behind in Hoobland.
69	4	"Cakes"	2001
Tula and Iver take turns at baking cakes for the Hoobs.
70	5	"Boats"	2001
The Hoobs visit the seaside, where they learn all about boats.
71	6	"Freezing"	2001
The Hoobs are disappointed that their Hoobofizz is frozen because they cannot drink it. Note: Postponed from Series 2
72	7	"Fresh"	2001
The Hoobs need something to keep the Hoobypuffs fresh. There's nothing worse than a Soggy Hoobypuff. Note: Postponed from Series 2
73	8	"Waking Up"	2001
The Hoobs wonder how they can wake up before or at the same time as when the sun rises. Note: Postponed from Series 2
74	9	"Exploring"	2001
Tula has to think of some things to take with her for going exploring. Note: Postponed from Series 2
75	10	"Exercise"	2001
The Hoobs keep fit by doing a few Peep exercises.
76	11	"Pairs"	2001
Iver is mystified to see a Tiddlypeep in two places at once.
77	12	"Funny Faces"	2001
Iver, Groove and Tula try out ways of making themselves look different.
78	13	"Cool"	2001
The Peep sun makes the Hoobs feel so hot, they are unable to answer any questions until cooling down for Hoob News.
79	14	"Stripes"	2001
The Hoobs try to find something that has stripes to decorate the model.
80	15	"Tidying Up"	2001
The Hoobs get out all their favourite collections and have a good look at them.
81	16	"Friends"	2001
Tula has made gifts for everyone except for Hubba Hubba, so Tula questions if Hubba Hubba is really her friend. Note: Postponed from Series 2
82	17	"Messages"	2001
The Hoobycomputer breaks down, prompting the Hoobs to look for other ways of sending messages. Note: Postponed from Series 2
83	18	"Names"	2001
Tula decides she would rather have a Peep name, but is not sure which one would suit her best.
84	19	"Snow"	2001
The Hoobs figure out how they can have fun in the snow. Note: Postponed from Series 2
85	20	"Roma's Visit"	2001
Roma comes to visit the Hoobs and wants her holiday to be special. Note: First episode in which Roma visits the Hoobmobile, and visits the Tiddlypeeps. Groove does Roma's report in this episode.
86	21	"Colours"	2001
The Hoobs learn about coordinating the colours of their Hooby-middle-grippers. Note: Postponed from Series 2
87	22	"Gloves"	2001
The Hoobs need a way to make Hoobocactospiker shakes without hurting their paws. Note: Postponed from Series 2
88	23	"Stuffing"	2001
The Hoobs want to get Humpty Dumpty to sit on the wall, but first the floppy fellow needs stuffing. Note: Postponed from Series 2, and the only postponed episode to have opening titles from the first two series and closing titles from Series 3.
89	24	"Stories"	2001
Tula wants to write a story, but she does not know what story to write.
90	25	"Taste"	2001
The Hoobs try some Hoobycookies with different tastes.
91	26	"Brave"	2001
The Hoobs want to know how they can feel brave.
92	27	"Fly Away"	2001
Iver makes friends with a little bird that visits him in the roof garden every day.
93	28	"Hiding"	2001
The Hoobs need to find a hiding place to hide from Hubba Hubba when playing Hooby-hide and Hooby-seek. Note: Postponed from Series 2
94	29	"Copying"	2001
The Hoobs find some things that are exactly the same.
95	30	"Shells"	2001
The Hoobs figure out what sort of shell can be useful.
96	31	"Swinging"	2001
The Hoobs find something to go swinging on the roof garden instead of a Hoobypod. Note: Postponed from Series 2
97	32	"Scared"	2001
Tula tries to overcome her fear of thunder. Note: Postponed from Series 2
98	33	"Pop"	2001
The Hoobs find 10 things that go pop. Note: Postponed from Series 1
99	34	"Spiky"	2001
The Hoobs find something that is round and spiky.
100	35	"Tula's Choice"	2001
Tula cannot decide which friend to take with her to the seaside.
101	36	"Sheep"	2001
The Hoobs need something to fix their blanket. Note: Postponed from Series 2
102	37	"Disappearing"	2001
The Hoobs figure out a way to make the purple mark on a white toy polar bear disappear.
103	38	"Hobbies"	2001
Iver wants to find a hobby that suits him.
104	39	"Toys"	2001
The Hoobs look at all kinds of Tiddlypeep toys since they were Hooblets.
105	40	"Slow"	2001
Groove and Tula try to help Iver slow down.
106	41	"Crumbs"	2001
The Hoobs wonder what happened to the Tiddlypeep buns.
107	42	"Hang Ups"	2001
Groove needs something to hang up his CDs.
108	43	"Picking Up"	2001
The Hoobs try to find some way to pick up Tula's Hoobypins out of the box without getting pricked.
109	44	"Dark"	2001
The Hoobs figure out why night has to be so dark.
110	45	"It's a Mystery"	2001
Hubba Hubba wants to read a Tiddlypeep fairy tale to The Hoobs, but he is missing a page from his book.
111	46	"Dinosaur"	2001
Groove cannot figure out where he can put this toy dinosaur in his collection. Note: Postponed from Series 2
112	47	"Wheels"	2001
The Hoobs wonder what sort of wheels could they have in the Hoobmobile. Note: Postponed from Series 2
113	48	"Soft"	2001
Tula needs something soft so she does not hurt herself. Note: Postponed from Series 2
114	49	"New Words"	2001
The Hoobs need to learn how to say some new words. Note: Postponed from Series 2
115	50	"Behind You!"	2001
Groove doesn't mind too much when Tiddlypeeps goes boo and makes him jump. Not as long as he gets to make them jump too, but they keep sneaking up on him. So how can Groove see behind him when he's out collecting?
116	51	"Bubbles"	2001
The Hoobs wonder why they are bubbles in the Hoobypond. Note: Postponed from Series 2
117	52	"Bouncing"	2001
The Hoobs find some things that can bounce. Note: Postponed from Series 1, and the only postponed episode to feature the original Hoobycomputer sound effect from Series 1.
118	53	"Big Loaf"	2001
The biggest Hoobynut loaf ever made contained 230 Hoobynuts. Tula's determined to beat this record - but first she has to gather 231 Hoobynuts, which might not be as easy as it sounds and Auntie Hattie Hoob in Hoobland must not be disturbed until after Hoob News.
119	54	"Lucky"	2001
Tula needs a good luck charm to make her feel lucky. Note: Postponed from Series 2
120	55	"Hats"	2001
The Hoobs wonder why Peeps wear flowerpots on their heads, which are hats. Note: Postponed from Series 1
121	56	"Camel"	2001
The Hoobs cannot figure out why camels have humps. Note: Postponed from Series 2
122	57	"Talking to Yourself"	2001
Groove and Tula think Iver is talking to himself, but he thinks he was talking to someone else. Note: Postponed from Series 2
123	58	"Surprises"	2001
The most important day in a Hoob's year is their HoobyTwizzletuft Day - the day when they first got their Twizzletuft clipped. This year Tula has given Iver and Groove a beautiful Russian doll. Note: Postponed from Series 1. Final episode to be postponed from Series 1.
124	59	"Ba-Boom!"	2001
Iver's been running up and down the stairs collecting the Hooboberry harvest; now his chest is going ba-boom, ba-boom.
125	60	"Trees"	27 November 2001
The Hoobs discover fruit in the Heebleleaf tree. Note: Postponed from Series 2. Final episode with Mark Jefferis as Hubba Hubba, and John Eccleston as Groove.

=== Series 4 (2001–2002) ===
No. overall	No. in series	Title	Original release date
126	1	"Hooblebumper Breakfast"	22 December 2001
Tula and Groove decide to have a huge Hoob breakfast called a Hooblebumper breakfast and Iver is too busy to be hungry for it. Note: First episode with Brian Herring taking over from Mark Jefferis as Hubba Hubba, and Jefferis taking over from John Eccleston as Groove. Tula, Hubba Hubba and Iver are redesigned for these final two series. Also the first episode to feature Roma's Hooby Picki Picki in the title sequence, the first series to feature another new format of Hubba Hubba and Roma buttons and the first series to feature the deep boing sound effect of opening and closing the Hoobofridge.
127	2	"Hoobyclues"	5 January 2002
The Hoobs are enjoying a good game of Hoobyclues. It's one of the Hoobs' favourite games and it helps them to unravel the mystery about the nuts that Groove found in a hole.
128	3	"Ouch!"	2002
While preparing for a picnic, Tula's paw gets stung, and it really hurts. Note: Postponed from the start of Series 4 due to Hubba Hubba's introduction voiced by Mark Jefferis.
129	4	"Round and Round"	2002
Iver scoffs at this: there is no such as something that goes round and round without stopping... is there?
130	5	"The Fair"	2002
Roma is coming to visit the Hoobmobile, so the Hoobs try and think of fun to do with her. Note: Features a number of visions of Iver, Groove and Tula in their later lives as they grow older.
131	6	"Pockets"	2002
Tula has made Groove a pocket on her Hooby-stitcher-upper but he cannot decide what to put in it. Note: Postponed from the start of Series 4 due to Hubba Hubba's introduction voiced by Mark Jefferis.
132	7	"Funny Tummies"	2002
The Hoobs are wondering what are belly buttons for.
133	8	"Shape Sorter"	2002
Groove's collection of "Different Shaped Things He Doesn't Know What to Do With" gets in Iver's way.
134	9	"Crash Bang Wallop"	2002
Groove decides to start a new collection – round flat things that make a Hoobygroovy noise.
135	10	"Peep Flowers"	2002
Tula wants to give Hubba Hubba some beautiful Peep flowers that the Tiddlypeeps have sent her for when The Hoobs return to Hoobland, but she doesn't know when that will be so how can she make the flowers last forever?
136	11	"Winning"	2002
Iver and Tula are mystified when Groove wins many egg and spoon races that they all enjoy doing – he normally loses.
137	12	"Groove's Wish"	2002
Groove is hoping for his wish to come true.
138	13	"A Pig Full of Surprises"	2002
Groove discovers a piggy bank containing some money.
139	14	"Rewards"	2002
Because they are good friends, Tula decides to make a reward for Iver and Groove.
140	15	"Hoob in a Mood"	2002
Groove is in a bad and foul mood. Tula and Iver try to find a way to cheer him up.
141	16	"Moon"	2002
While reading poetry to Roma, Iver discovers the Man in the Moon.
142	17	"Soggy Crispies"	2002
Groove is taking Iver collecting, but Tula has made Hooby Crispy Cakes. When Iver and Groove come back The Hoobs find the Crispies have gone soggy because they are too late to eat them.
143	18	"Giant"	2002
The Hoobs are reading Jack and the Beanstalk. Groove is Jack, Tula is Jack's mum and Iver is playing the giant.
144	19	"The Drip"	2002
The Hoobs are horrified when they discover a drip in the Hoobmobile ceiling. Note: Postponed from the start of Series 4 due to Hubba Hubba's introduction voiced by Mark Jefferis. Also the last episode Mark Jefferis provides the talking voice for Hubba Hubba.
145	20	"Pirates"	2002
Groove finds a treasure chest. However, he hears that pirates like to steal treasure.
146	21	"Hoobamaflip"	2002
The Hoobs find a way to work the Hoobamaflip. Their catchphrase of how to make the Hoobamaflip work is "Ready to Grab, Ready to Lift, Ready to Drop, Ready to Flip". Note: Postponed from the start of Series 4 due to John Eccleston's Groove "Wayhey!" in the opening and closing titles.
147	22	"Magic Words"	2002
The Hoobs want to celebrate Shoobedyshiny Day by wearing Shoop-Shoop and doing the Shoop-Shoop Dance. Without any magic words which are "Please", "Thank You" and "Sorry" Groove misses out on not only wearing a Shoop-Shoop but also doing Shoop-Shoop Dances. Note: Postponed from the start of Series 4 due to John Eccleston's Groove "Wayhey!" in the opening and closing titles.
148	23	"Beautiful"	2002
Groove is unable to figure out why there is an old metal thing in his collection of beautiful things. Note: The last episode where Mark Jefferis provides the singing voice for Hubba Hubba, making this the final time Jefferis provides Hubba Hubba's voice in the series.
149	24	"Funny Sounds"	2002
The Hoobs find something that makes funny sounds scoring a count on how many hoobaboobas.
150	25	"Art"	2002
The Hoobs want to make all kinds of art. Note: Postponed from the start of Series 4 due to the copyright year being 2001.
151	26	"That Noise"	2002
Groove and Tula go back to their game on the roof garden called "Hooby Wack & Grab" and Iver makes a strange, sad, groaning, sighing sound when he hurts his arm and accidentally squashes the hooboberry bush.
152	27	"Our Friend Flash"	2002
The Hoobs cannot figure out what is wrong with Flash the tortoise because Flash is hiding in a shell.
153	28	"Ah-choo!"	2002
Iver and Tula get jumped when Groove begins to sneeze.
154	29	"A Doob for a Hoob"	2002
Iver and Tula cannot figure out who Groove is talking to.
155	30	"Big Day In"	2002
The Hoobs want to go on a trip outdoors but it starts raining due to a rainy thunderstorm and Groove is wanting to stay in his hoobypod. Note: Final episode to be postponed from the start of Series 4.
156	31	"Miss Hoob"	2002
The Hoobs and Tula cannot figure out which job will be perfect whether it can be pupil or teacher.
157	32	"Yawning"	2002
The Hoobs cannot figure out why are they yawning.
158	33	"The Shoobage"	2002
The Hoobs need to find a way to eat the Shoobage. Note: Features a flashback to when Hubba Hubba gives Iver a Hoobysprouter for Shoobage in Hoobland.
159	34	"Relax"	2002
Groove and Tula help Iver relax.
160	35	"Get on with the Game"	2002
Iver wants to find out how to play a mystery message game.
161	36	"Groove the Greedy"	2002
Groove is being greedy when he did not share all the sweets.
162	37	"Fairyland"	2002
Tula wants to be a fairy queen but she does not know how to.
163	38	"Hoobyhics"	2002
Tula has the Hoobyhics which are Hiccups but she has lots of things to do.
164	39	"Clumsy"	2002
Tula is being very clumsy as she is painting a picture of the sunset on the roof garden and Iver and Groove are trying to find out why.
165	40	"Hurry Up"	2002
Iver and Tula need Groove to speed things up.
166	41	"A Place for Tula"	2002
Tula wants to find a place to write her poem.
167	42	"Mums and Dads"	2002
Roma babysits a Squigglytiddlypeep while its mum and dad are away. Note: Iver does Roma's report in this episode. The only episode in which Iver does Roma's report. Other episodes with Roma being busy with other things happens with Groove doing Roma's report.
168	43	"Underground"	2002
The Hoobs wonder what is like to live underground.
169	44	"Warm Juice"	2002
Tula needs some way to make her Hoobjuice warm while she paints a picture of the penguins.
170	45	"Telling Tales"	2002
Groove tells Iver on Tula after she knocks over his tray of Hooboblubbers.
171	46	"Every Hoob's a Star"	2002
Iver begins to show off when he is full of bright ideas.
172	47	"Riddle Me Ree"	2002
Roma and the Hoobs try to play a riddle game. Note: First episode in which Groove has a go at driving Roma's Hooby Picki Picki. Groove does Roma's report in this episode.
173	48	"Little Round Somethings"	2002
The Hoobs want to know what those little round things are.
174	49	"Jobs"	2002
The Hoobs want to find a job that will suit them.
175	50	"Tula's Big Day"	2002
Tula is getting ready for a big day at the Tiddlypeeps' school.
176	51	"Creepy Crawlies"	2002
Iver and Tula want to know what kind of creepy-crawly is inside Groove's box.
177	52	"Birdsong"	2002
Tula hears a little bird singing in the Heebleleaf tree on the roof garden.
178	53	"Playhouse"	2002
The Hoobs want to build a playhouse so they can have fun.
179	54	"Flies"	2002
The Hoobs need something to keep the pesky flies away from their Hoobyfigs.
180	55	"Tula in Wonderland"	2002
Tula is feeling very bored and needs something to cure her boredom. Note: The only episode in which Hubba Hubba was having trouble with Hoobnet.
181	56	"Clubs"	2002
Iver and the Hoobs need something to make their club special.
182	57	"Hoobydudu"	2002
Hubba Hubba has to take care of a Hoobydudu egg for Auntie Hattie. Hoobydudus come in all shapes and sizes whether they're wrigglers, gigglers, dreamers or screamers, but how are the Hoobs going to do Hoob News with all that screaming noise the Hoobydudu is making?!
183	58	"Robin Hood"	2002
The Hoobs find out what life was like for Robin Hood.
184	59	"A Whale of a Time"	2002
Iver wants to go whale-watching with the Tiddlypeeps but he is afraid of whales.
185	60	"A Problem for the Pansies"	2002
Iver is not sure how his pansies are among Tula's big yellow flower.
186	61	"Seeing Clearly"	2002
Tula cannot see a thing and thinks there is something wrong with her eyes.
187	62	"The Old Bamboo"	2002
Groove has some old bamboo instead of some sticks.
188	63	"Down in the Middle"	2002
The Hoobs find out what is deep down inside the Peep Planet. The Red line across the centre of the globe makes Groove attempt to cut the globe in half but Iver won't let Groove do so.
189	64	"Somebody Loves You"	2002
Iver wants to find out who the love card is from.
190	65	"Don't Drink the Water"	2002
The Hoobs are wondering why the lemonade tastes terrible.
191	66	"Iver the Robot"	2002
Iver would like to be a robot without thinking or getting his feelings hurt.
192	67	"Marooned"	2002
The Hoobs want to know how Robinson Crusoe escapes from a desert island. Note: The only episode in Series 4 without the Hoobmobile moving. Other episodes without the Hoobmobile moving happen in the following series.
193	68	"Rude Hoob"	2002
Groove really wants to put Iver's flashing bow tie in his collection but without a magic word from Groove, Iver rejects it and the answer is "No".
194	69	"Hoozleberry Blues"	2002
The Hoobs do not know what happened to the Hoozleberry bush and what had caused damage to the Hoozleberries.
195	70	"Sir Iverlot"	2002
Iver wants to be a very brave knight.
196	71	"Yee Haw"	2002
Groove wishes he could be with the cows all the time.
197	72	"Iver's Big Trip"	2002
Iver needs something to take with him to go on a trip.
198	73	"Bedtime Story"	1 April 2002
Iver tries to find a way to read his book without keeping Tula and Groove awake.

=== Series 5 (2002–2003) ===
No. overall	No. in series	Title	Original release date
199	1	"Hoobledoop"	23 September 2002
Roma has been asked to take pictures of Groove and his collections for a magazine in Hoobland.
200	2	"Hooblebumper Box Day"	
Every year the Hoobs celebrate Hooblebumper Box Day. There's only one thing Iver isn't actually good at doing.
201	3	"Chocolate"	
Tula is making some gingerbread Hoobs and has some chocolate buttons ready.
202	4	"Dangerous"	
The Tiddlypeeps have invited Iver on an expedition, but he's worried about how dangerous it could be.
203	5	"News"	
The Hoob News screen is broken and Iver wants to try and fix it, but Tula and Groove want to find other ways to broadcast Hoob News.
204	6	"Groove's Special Collection"	
Groove is trying to think up another collection – but this one needs to be special.
205	7	"Cards"	
Groove has found a pack of cards in his collection and wants to do clever stuff with them.
206	8	"Change"	
Iver is tired of everything being the same. He wants to change himself more than anything.
207	9	"Sherlock Groove"	
On the Cluttered Cupboard floor, there is a filthy tablecloth which Iver decides to clean.
208	10	"Not a Horse"	
Groove's friend Tim has a favourite animal, and it is an unusual animal, but it's definitely not a horse.
209	11	"Elbows"	
Iver is frustrated. He keeps banging his elbow and it really hurts.
210	12	"Motorette Magic"	
There appears to be a problem with the Motorettes; The Hoobmobile has broken down and Iver is trying to fix the problem. Groove should be able to help with the music to put in the Hoobmobile's tank, but all he can do is fix his own bicycle. Note: The Hoobmobile doesn't move in this episode.
211	13	"Hooby Growinaday Tree"	
Groove grows Hooby Grow-in-a-day Tree, which is literally a tree that grows in the day. Meanwhile, Iver is finding out about relatives. Note: The only other episode to feature the Hoobydudu in the song sung by Hubba Hubba.
212	14	"Little Pink Riding Hoob"	
The Hoobs are putting on a play of Little Pink Riding Hoob for the Tiddlypeeps.
213	15	"Hooby Races"	
It is Sports Day, and the Hoobs attempt their own and then it was organised by the peeps and tiddlypeeps.
214	16	"Little Green Sticky Thing"	
Groove has found a little green thing on one of the trees on the roof garden.
215	17	"Tiger in Need"	
Tula hears a tigress named Tallulah that needs help.
216	18	"Promises"	
Groove just cannot help himself – he keeps breaking promises, and Iver and Tula are fed up, sick and tired of it.
217	19	"Twinkly Wrinklypeep"	
When the Hoobyharvest produces too much food, Iver decides to spare to the old people's home down the road.
218	20	"Cover Up"	
In a tussle with Tula, Groove manages to splatter his Hoobjuice on the wall, and Hoobjuice is famous for staining.
219	21	"Iver's Buns"	
Someone has been moving Tula's seashells in the Hoobofridge and Iver's buns up on the roof garden.
220	22	"Buddy Beacon"	
Tula is building something to show the passing Hoobmobiles that the Hoobs are down on the Peep Planet.
221	23	"The Fastest Thing on Legs"	
Iver is the fastest thing on legs on the Peep Planet.
222	24	"Banana Banana Carrot"	
The Hoobs find out what kind of game it is on a game show. It could be based on Duck Duck Goose.
223	25	"Emperor"	
Iver wants to be the emperor of the high Hoobaciousness.
224	26	"Tight Fit"	
Groove cannot go jogging if his vest does not fit him.
225	27	"Hooby Holiday"	
Tula's friend Jake is left behind when his friends go on an activity holiday.
226	28	"Opera Singer"	
Tula discovers that auditions for a part in an opera are being held and decides to try out. However, she discovers that it's not just a good voice you need to sing opera.
227	29	"Signs"	
The Hoobs wonder why some signs are useful.
228	30	"House of Iver"	
Iver wants to wear some clothes so he can go the Tiddlypeeps' garden party.
229	31	"Jambo Tambo"	
Tula and the Hoobs' African friend Rijina is going to release Tambo the baby elephant back into the wild.
230	32	"Lost"	
Iver and Groove have gone missing, so Tula and Roma have to find out where they are. Note: Groove and Iver don't join in for Hoob News, Tula and Roma do Hoob News together instead.
231	33	"Overloaded"	
The Hoobs are puzzled why the Motorettes are wheezing and puffing. The Hoobmobile is overloaded with Groove's collections. Note: The Hoobmobile doesn't move in this episode.
232	34	"Restaurant"	
Tula is fed up with her cooking and wants to visit a nice restaurant.
233	35	"Flower Power"	
The Hoobs want to take some flowers back to Hoobland to remind them of the Peep gardens.
234	36	"Iver Five-O"	
Iver wonders what it's like to ride in a police car.
235	37	"Llama Farmer"	
The Hoobs are curious about an animal on the Peep Planet that looks like another Hoob.
236	38	"Record Breakers"	
The Hoobs want to break a world record before they do Hoob News.
237	39	"Three Hoobs, One Bus"	
The Hoobs wonder why the Hoobmobile is big enough for them to be divided by and into 3 rooms.
238	40	"Voice Choice"	
Groove and Tula cannot figure out why Iver is whining.
239	41	"Day Off"	
Hubba Hubba gives the Hoobs a nice day off. Note: Features flashbacks to numerous episodes. Also features Hubba Hubba riding in the back seat of Roma's Hooby Picki Picki during Roma's report as Roma takes Hubba Hubba back home to Hoobland.
240	42	"Pancakes"	
The Hoobs need some ingredients to make some pancakes.
241	43	"Costume Drama"	
The Hoobs are invited to the Tiddlypeeps' costume party.
242	44	"Soft Floppy Fun"	
Tula and Iver put a smile on Groove's face by trying to find a tail that will suit him.
243	45	"Window Dressing"	
Tula thinks the windows look beautiful, but Iver disagrees and Groove has a collection of things to decorate windows with.
244	46	"Tricks with Bricks"	
Tula wants to build whatever she likes with bricks.
245	47	"King of the Sea"	
Iver, Groove, Tula and Roma wonder who will be king of the sea.
246	48	"Shop Til You Drop"	
The Hoobs figure out what will they have for their very own shop.
247	49	"The Big Bonk"	
The Hoobs do not know why Hubba Hubba is not responding. They have no idea where he is until they hear a big bonk on the roof garden. Note: The only episode where Hubba Hubba visits the Hoobs and the Tiddlypeeps, and the only episode in which Hubba Hubba does Hoob News.
248	50	"Bossy Boots"	
Tula and Groove need some way to stop Iver interfering. Note: The last episode to feature the folk/country version of "We're Off to See the Tiddlypeeps".
249	51	"The Flapperdipperdancer"	
The Hoobs are invited to an art competition to make an amazing animal. Note: The last episode to feature the classical/opera version of "We're Off to See the Tiddlypeeps".
250	52	"Is This Hoobletoodledoo?"	3 January 2003
Hubba Hubba gives the Hoobs some exciting news: they are going back to Hoobland. The Hoobs, however, are sad they have to go. They prepare for their departure, nonetheless. When the times comes, however, they are told they can stay on the Peep Planet if they wish. Whether or not they actually leave is left ambiguous. Note: Features flashbacks to numerous encounters with the Tiddlypeeps. The last episode to feature the disco/pop version of "We're Off to See the Tiddlypeeps".

== Puppeteers ==
- Don Austen - Iver
- John Eccleston - Groove (Series 1−3)
- Julie Westwood - Tula
- Gillie Robic - Roma
- Mark Jefferis - Hubba Hubba (Series 1−3, some episodes of Series 4) and Twang
- Brian Herring - Groove and Hubba Hubba (Series 4 and 5)
- Rebecca Nagan - Tootle
- Wim Booth - Timp

== Production ==
Channel 4 announced in November 2000 that a new educational series, titled "The Hoobs", had been developed for a pre-school audience. In a £20 million joint venture between Channel 4 and The Jim Henson Company, the channel commissioned 250 half-hour episodes which were to be broadcast from early 2001 (to replace Sesame Street). The series was set to be the biggest pre-school series on British television as it was said that "Channel 4 hopes its Hoobs will be the new Teletubbies and the new Tweenies" and wished from it to match its success. The puppets for the characters were made by Jim Henson's Muppet Workshop.

Executive vice-president Angus Fletcher of Jim Henson Television commented that "We are delighted to have the opportunity to pioneer a groundbreaking format which will address the needs of the first truly multi-media generation".

== Broadcast history ==
=== United Kingdom ===
The series premiered on Channel 4 on 15 January 2001 from 6:00am to 7:00am, with two episodes being broadcast each weekday morning. The episodes were repeated from 11:00 am during the Channel 4 Schools strand 4Learning, finishing its run of 250 episodes on 3 January 2003. Although the series ceased production in the United Kingdom in July 2002, it was regularly repeated in the same early morning time slot for several years afterwards. It was temporarily taken off the schedule every year during the Christmas period and returned in the new year. Between August 2006 and December 2012, repeats were followed by Freshly Squeezed, where The Hoobs was occasionally mentioned.

After the cancellation of Freshly Squeezed, The Hoobs continued airing on weekday mornings up until 2 December 2013, and weekend mornings until 30 August 2014, when repeats were upended altogether and replaced with reruns of How I Met Your Mother.

It also aired on Nick Jr. UK from 2002 to 2004.

=== International ===
The Hoobs has also been shown in several countries around the world, including the United States (the series formerly airing on PBS Kids Sprout), Australia (airing on both ABC and ABC2 from 4 February 2002 to 2 July 2011), Poland (Polsat JimJam and TV4), Hungary (JimJam), Spain (Telemadrid and on K3 in Catalonia) and Israel (Hop!). In Italy, "Hello Hoobs" aired on JimJam from Sky. In Germany, the show aired on KiKA. It aired on Semillitas in Latin America, and on Alter Channel in Greece. In Ireland, it was screened on TG4, where it was dubbed into Irish Gaelic, and in Hong Kong, it aired on TVB Pearl. As of July 2025, the series is featured on the Yippee TV streaming service.

== Home media releases ==
From 2001 to 2003 in the United Kingdom, Columbia TriStar Home Entertainment released four VHS tapes in the United Kingdom each containing two episodes: "Finding Out", "Holidays", "Funny Faces" and "Groove's Wish". Three of the tapes were also released as a bi-pack, and a promotional tape named "Meet the Hoobs" was also released.

"Groove's Wish" was also issued out on DVD by CTHE in April 2002, which included an extra episode. Another DVD - "Hooble Toodle Doo!", was released in September 2005 by HIT Entertainment.

=== Video game ===
A video game based on the show was released for the PlayStation on 7 June 2002, developed by Runecraft and published by Sony Computer Entertainment Europe.

== See also ==
- The Muppets
