= CBBC Puppets =

Sidekicks used in BBC children's programmes

CBBC Puppets are makeshift sidekicks which are used as part of the presentation of children's programmes on the BBC, and have been used since in-vision children's continuity began in 1985.

== History ==
"Bobby the Banana", an inanimate plush banana toy, was the first puppet, joining presenter Phillip Schofield for many of the in-vision links. Bobby the Banana was generally phased out and made way for the more expressive Gordon the Gopher, a hand puppet gopher operated, from under Schofield's continuity desk, by Paul Smith. As Gordon's personality – and costume, gaining a leather biker's jacket – grew, so did his popularity, leading to increasing screen time interactions and 'story lines' with Schofield, and proved so popular that the character was giving his own line of various merchandise, which was branded Gordon T. Gopher. When Schofield departed as host of The Broom Cupboard in 1987 to host the BBC's new Saturday morning programme Going Live!, Gordon the Gopher went with him to the new series.

Schofield's replacement Andy Crane continued to host in much the same vein as Schofield and the format remaining unchanged. With Gordon the Gopher having left with Schofield, Crane quickly gained his own similarly mischievous side-kick in the form of Edd the Duck – a plush duck hand puppet, operated similarly from under the control desk, by assistant producer Christina Mackay-Robinson (now Brown). Whereas Gordon the Gopher was mute, Edd communicated in quacks – of which Crane and guests seemed able to understand. Similarly to Gordon, Edd (originally spelled 'Ed')'s personality and costume swifty developed; originally appearing 'bald', several months in he gained a green woollen mohawk from a Blue Peter make, which became part of his trademark look; Edd's love for Blue Peter, supposed "love" for its co-presenter Yvette Fielding and longing to become a Blue Peter presenter, all became regular fixture. Introduced a few months later was Wilson the Butler, only visible to viewers as a pair of white gloved arms in a black water's jacket appearing from the side of the screen, who became Edd's co-star and nemesis. As with the popularity of Gordon the Gopher, Edd the Duck similarly received his own line of merchandise. Andy Crane vacated the presenter's chair in 1990, moving to host programmes from rival Children's ITV, and was replaced with Andi Peters who spent four years in the role, with Edd, Wilson and the overall Broom Cupboard format remaining identical.

With Peters in turn departed in 1993, the role of central host was filled by Toby Anstis, who would remain with the Children's BBC strand after the Broom Cupboard setting was dropped as part of a significant shake-up of the format in 1996–97.

Since then, many different puppet sidekicks have been used and the list below details many of those who have appeared on screen, either in CBBC continuity or programmes, over the last 35 years.

== Overview ==
Name	Year	Notable TV programmes
Basil Brush	1963–2010, 2020	The Basil Brush Show, Basil's Swap Shop and Crackerjack!
Gordon the Gopher	1985–1993	The Broom Cupboard, Going Live! and It Started With Swap Shop
Edd the Duck	1988–1994	The Broom Cupboard
Ratz	1993–1994	Live & Kicking
Mr. Sage & Mr. Onion The Leprechauns	1993–2001	Live & Kicking
Otis the Aardvark	1994–1999	CBBC Studio and Saturday Aardvark
Emlyn the Gremlyn	1999–2001	CBBC Studio
Tiny and Mr Duk	2001–2004	The Saturday Show and Tiny and Mr Duk's Huge Show
The Neighbour's Cat	2002–2006	Dick & Dom in da Bungalow
Nev the Bear	2002–2010, 2012	Smile, Bear Behaving Badly and Hacker Time
Oucho T. Cactus	2007–2010	CBBC Office, Ed and Oucho's Excellent Inventions and Transmission Impossible with Ed and Oucho
Hacker T Dog	2009–present	CBBC Office/HQ, Hacker Time and Scoop, and Saturday Mash-Up!
Rattus Rattus	2009–present	Horrible Histories and Horrible Histories: Gory Games
Dodge T. Dog	2010–2016 (CBBC) 2015–present (CBeebies)	CBBC Office/HQ, CBeebies House and Hacker Time
Bl1nk Bot 3	2016	CBBC HQ
Stanley	2020–present	Saturday Mash-Up!
