= Fast Forward (magazine) =

Defunct British children's magazine

- Categories: Children, teenagers
- Frequency: Weekly
- First issue: September 1989
- Final issue: September 1995
- Country: United Kingdom

Fast Forward was a weekly children's magazine launched in September 1989 by the BBC to compete with Look-in. It was aimed at seven- to 14-year-olds and was promoted heavily with trailers shown on Children's BBC. Circulation started at 210,000 copies per week and reached a peak of 340,000 in March 1990, but fell to 150,000 by Spring 1991. Fast Forward generally sold around 40% to 50% more copies than Look-in on a weekly basis.

== Format ==
The centre pages of Fast Forward magazine usually included a pull-out poster. This would often be of television celebrities of the time, although on one occasion an edition was sold with 3-D glasses and a 3-D anaglyphic poster of New York.

The magazine usually contained a number of cartoon scripts of celebrities and presenters who appeared on Children's BBC, such as Jimmy Savile and Andi Peters. It also regularly contained material relating to Edd the Duck and Gordon the Gopher, as well as an EastEnders-based comic strip.

In September 1990, the BBC also relaunched the Number One pop music magazine aimed mainly at girls. In early 1992, the Number One magazine was incorporated into Fast Forward.

At the start, the magazine only covered BBC programmes, but from March 1991 it also covered ITV and C4 – it was able to do so due to the deregulation of the TV listings market. (This also enabled the BBC's main television magazine, the Radio Times, to include listings of rival terrestrial channels.)

Fast Forward could be considered to be a replacement for a less successful earlier children's magazine, BEEB. Fast Forward disappeared from the market in September 1995, as had Look-In eighteen months earlier, leaving no specifically TV-oriented magazine for young teenagers on sale in Britain. In 1995 Top Of The Pops Magazine was launched, effectively catering for the Number One market.

== Comic strips ==
The following comic strips appeared in Fast Forward:

- 'Allo 'Allo!
- Baywatch
- Bread
- EastEnders
- The Flintstones
- Gordon the Gopher
- Grange Hill
- TV Centre
