= Continuity announcers in the United Kingdom =

In the United Kingdom, continuity announcers are people who are employed to introduce programmes on radio and television networks, to promote forthcoming programmes on the station, to cross-promote programmes on the broadcaster's other stations where applicable and, sometimes, to provide information relating to the programme that was being broadcast.

The six pre-digital terrestrial television channels in the UK (BBC One, BBC Two, ITV, Channel 4, S4C and Channel 5) make use of continuity announcers, and most of the time, continuity announcements are presented live. Continuity announcers can also be found on digital and satellite channels and are live at all times.

== BBC ==
The BBC mainly uses live announcers on its flagship television channels BBC One and BBC Two, and on its digital channels (apart from BBC News and BBC Parliament, which do not use announcers at all). Separate continuity for BBC One and BBC Two in Scotland, Wales and Northern Ireland is provided by local announcers who also double as transmission directors.

Presently, the only UK national radio station to use continuity announcers is BBC Radio 4, where many of the announcing staff also act as newsreaders and also introduce the station's Shipping Forecast. The BBC World Service still uses announcers as radio newsreaders but live continuity was discontinued in the early 2010s. Until about 1990, BBC Radio 2 used continuity announcers (separate from newsreaders) for its weekend and evening output, but these have since disappeared. Similarly, BBC Radio 3 has downgraded the former role of its announcers in favour of a new style of presenter. Continuity announcers played a much heavier role on the pre-1967 BBC Home Service, BBC Light Programme and BBC Third Programme (and other services on the last-named's frequency). BBC Radio Scotland discontinued the role of dedicated announcers around 2008. Promotional content is included within programmes, while news bulletins are read by Broadcast Journalists. Announcing staff for BBC Radio Cymru, BBC Radio Ulster and BBC Radio Wales double as newsreaders and technical operators.

Continuity announcements for BBC television channels are broadcast from Red Bee Media at the White City Media Village in West London, with separate continuity teams for the nations of Scotland, Wales and Northern Ireland based in the broadcasting centres in Belfast, Cardiff and Glasgow, providing links for the local variations of BBC One and BBC Two, as well as the BBC Scotland channel.

CBBC and CBeebies continuity now airs from studios at MediaCityUK in Salford Quays – up until September 2011, CBBC presentation was broadcast from a small studio in the East Tower of BBC Television Centre while CBeebies presentation was also live at Teddington Studios. The announcing team for BBC Radio 4 work from a suite of studios on the 7th floor of Broadcasting House in London.

Historically, BBC announcers mostly spoke with Received Pronunciation, but the range of accents heard has widened considerably in recent years, and the general tone has become more informal.

=== In-vision continuity ===
==== Early continuity ====
Andrew Martin, an expert from the BBC archives, described continuity announcements as "an essential part of television," which "actually tell us quite a lot about the style, the kind of attitudes of television in their particular era."

In-vision continuity announcers, who appeared on screen between programmes, were a staple part of television broadcasts from the very earliest days of television, because "there was a need for linking material between programmes just to kind of announce them." In the early days of television, it was almost like a variety bill in the theatre... [and when] an item would come on, somebody had to say what it was often listing an entire evening's up-coming programming in one link.

The early announcers became "celebrities in their own right," often receiving considerable amounts of fan mail, as they were among the most recognisable on-screen individuals, appearing every day, at the start of an era when television celebrity began. Early in-vision announcers included Elizabeth Cowell, Leslie Mitchell, formerly a newsreel announcer, and Jasmine Bligh, who re-opened the television service in 1946. The early continuity announcers were auditioned, as "they had to look good but they also had to speak well", as clear speaking was crucial to their role.

==== Later continuity ====
It is believed that in-vision continuity was last used during the peak viewing hours on BBC TV in the early 1960s, with a link into the Eurovision Song Contest 1963 the last-known example of the corporation's use of in-vision continuity (as well as existing out-of-vision continuity) across the national network.

Between the late 1960s and circa 1980, many of the BBC's English regions provided their own continuity on weekday evenings, including in-vision presentation – particularly at closedown. Regional in-vision continuity was still used by BBC South in Southampton, BBC Midlands in Birmingham and BBC North West in Manchester by the time English regional continuity was phased out. From 1998 to 2001, the Northern Ireland regional service on BBC Choice used in-vision continuity links.

==== Children's continuity ====
The presentation of children's programmes had in-vision continuity from its instigation until 1965. The best-known children's in-vision continuity face was that of schoolgirl Jennifer Gay, one of the Children's Hour announcers, who introduced such favourites as Muffin the Mule between 1949 and 1953.

In-vision continuity was re-introduced as part of Children's BBC/CBBC) on 9 September 1985. From then until 1994, this came from the main BBC1 continuity suite itself, referred to as "the broom cupboard" and introduced by various presenters including Andy Crane, Andi Peters and Phillip Schofield; Since then, it has come from larger, specialised studios. Children's BBC Scotland used in-vision continuity from 1992–1996, but this was omitted in favour of out-of-vision continuity from 1997–2000. As of September 2011, presentation for both CBBC and CBeebies originates from the BBC's MediaCityUK studios in Salford Quays, following the BBC Children's department move from London.

==== Modern continuity ====
In February 2008, BBC Three introduced in-vision continuity links, in the form of live links with presenter Jose Vanders and recorded links with BBC Three viewers. For a time, the BBC Three website offered viewers the opportunity to record links for programmes. The live in-vision links were dropped after only a few months although live out-of-vision continuity during peak time returned in September 2011.

On 19 September 2008, the Scottish Gaelic-language digital channel BBC Alba launched with in-vision continuity from the channel's sole announcer, Fiona MacKenzie. A second in-vision announcer, Moira MacDonald, was appointed in July 2009. All continuity links are live in Stornoway and transmitted from BBC Scotland's headquarters in Glasgow.

== ITV ==
All announcements for ITV plc-owned stations on ITV1, ITV2, ITV3, ITV4 and ITVBe originate from the company's main transmission facilities at Technicolor in Chiswick, Greater London. CITV was the only ITV channel not to use continuity announcers until its closure in August/September 2023.

A separate team of announcers for the separately-owned STV is based at the company's headquarters in Pacific Quay, Glasgow.

Most announcements broadcast on ITV1 are conducted live, as well as overnight announcements, regional opt-out continuity and links for ITV2, ITV3 and ITV4. All of ITV plc's announcers work on a freelance basis.

STV uses live continuity during the evening (between around 5pm and midnight) with daytime announcements pre-recorded by the duty prime time announcer during their shift. STV-branded presentation is used throughout the station's broadcast hours with transmission operated and overseen by technical staff in Glasgow 24 hours a day.

The consolidation of ITV companies during the 1990s and 2000s led to the closure of transmission and continuity facilities at some ITV company studios:

ITV region	ITV company at time of last known announcement	Date of last known announcement
The Borders	Border Television	Late 1999/early 2000 (regional continuity moved to Yorkshire Television in Leeds)
Central Scotland	Scottish Television	Still has regional continuity (also heard in Northern Scotland)
Channel Islands	Channel Television	28 October 2002 (switched to network continuity from The London Studios)
East of England	Anglia Television	Circa 2000 (regional continuity moved to Meridian Broadcasting in Southampton)
London	ITV London (Carlton/London Weekend Television)	Still has regional continuity (now networked on ITV)
Midlands	Central Independent Television	28 October 2002 (regional continuity moved to The London Studios). Transmission moved to Yorkshire Television in Leeds in 2004.
North Scotland	Grampian Television	July 1998 (regional continuity moved to STV in Glasgow)
North East England	Tyne Tees Television	16 March 1996 (regional continuity moved to Yorkshire Television in Leeds). Transmission moved to Leeds in early September 1993 (probably 4 September); All non-live presentation fed from Leeds starting 1 January 1993.
North West England	Granada Television	1998 (regional continuity moved to Yorkshire Television in Leeds)
Northern Ireland	UTV	2 April 2020 (playout moved to Chiswick on 17 October 2016)
South and South East	Meridian Broadcasting	28 October 2002 (regional continuity moved to The London Studios).
Wales and West	HTV Wales/HTV West	15 January 2006 in Wales (regional continuity moved to The London Studios), 2000 in the West (regional continuity moved to Meridian Broadcasting in Southampton)
South West England	Westcountry Television	28 October 2002 (playout controlled from HTV in Cardiff - presentation moved to The London Studios in November 2002)
Yorkshire and Lincolnshire	Yorkshire Television	28 October 2002 (regional continuity moved to The London Studios)

=== In-vision continuity ===
The use of on screen continuity announcers was common on ITV when each region was run by an independent company with their own transmission and continuity facilities. During the 1980s and 1990s, many regional companies abandoned the use of in-vision continuity announcers:

ITV region	ITV company at time of last known in-vision announcement	Date of last known in-vision announcement
The Borders	Border Television	Still in use in 1999, believed to have been dropped when continuity moved to Yorkshire Television in Leeds.
Central Scotland	Scottish Television	Dropped January 1989 for general continuity, retained for Scottish Through the Night only. Believed to have been dropped in October 1991.
Channel Islands	Channel Television	Still in use in late 1990s.
East of England	Anglia Television	Still in use in 1990 for Anglia Through the Night only, dropped in September 1991.
London	Thames Television (now a Production Company)/London Weekend Television (now part of ITV London)	Thames: probably the end of 1987 in the evenings, 1988 in daytime and 1991 for overnights. LWT: around the end of February 1983
Midlands	Central Independent Television	Still in use in April 1987, dropped soon afterwards.
North Scotland	Grampian Television	Dropped in the summer of 1998, shortly before continuity moved to STV in Glasgow in September 1998.
North East England	Tyne Tees Television	Dropped on 16 March 1996, when continuity moved to Yorkshire Television in Leeds. Previously dropped in 1970 (at the same time as Yorkshire following the Trident takeover), reintroduced in 1971.
North West England	Granada Television	Still in use in September 1996, dropped before continuity moved to Yorkshire Television in Leeds.
Northern Ireland	UTV	16 October 2016 IVC returned for a one off on Christmas Day 2017, presented by Julian Simmons.
South and South East	Meridian Broadcasting	1995 – Meridian only used IVC during Nighttime at weekends. Their predecessors, TVS dropped in-vision in the daytime and evening in September 1987, but in-vision links continued for Late Night Late until September 1991.
Wales and West	HTV Wales/HTV West	Wales: 31 December 1992. West: circa July 1993. Previously dropped in early 1970s, reintroduced c. 1975.
South West England	Television South West	31 December 1992.
Yorkshire and Lincolnshire	Yorkshire Television	1970.

The only ITV companies which have never used in-vision continuity are Carlton Television (London) which in 2002, Carlton Television became half of ITV London. and Westcountry Television, who both began broadcasting on 1 January 1993.

Granada Television, for its first 20 years or so, never used in-vision continuity as its CEO, Sidney Bernstein, considered it frivolous for a station that was trying to match the BBC in image and respectability (despite the BBC employing in-vision announcers at the time of Granada's launch) and felt that having a mere functionary would cheapen the station. This decision was reversed in the late 1970s and early 1980s, following Sidney Bernstein's retirement.

== Channel 4 ==
Channel 4 employs continuity announcers on its network of stations; 4seven, Channel 4, E4, Film4 and More4. All announcements come from Red Bee Media at White City Media Village in West London. Since 2009, Red Bee have provided playout facilities for Channel 4. On 4seven, E4 and More4, announcements during evening primetime are now commonly broadcast live, with additional live announcements at other times; most announcements on Channel 4 are live. Announcements for 4Music programming, where used, are also live.

=== In-vision continuity ===
Channel 4 used links featuring the announcer on-screen for a brief period following its launch in 1982, mainly at closedown. The station briefly reprised the use of in-vision continuity links for a short period from 1996, used mainly in evening transmissions.

== S4C ==
S4C announcers provide live out-of-vision continuity links from New Broadcasting House, Cardiff.

=== In-vision continuity ===
S4C used in-vision continuity throughout broadcast hours from launch in November 1982 until around 1991.

In-vision presentation continues to be used during S4C's children strands, Cyw (for young children) and Stwnsh (for older children). Stwnsh links are mostly conducted live whereas Cyw links are live as well. Characters and presenters from S4C's Cyw output occasionally appear to provide continuity links.

Children's presentation is produced by independent production companies Boomerang (Stwnsh/Cyw in-vision links) and Cwmni Da (Cyw).

== Channel 5 ==
Channel 5 use live announcers on its network of stations; 5Star, 5USA, 5Action, 5Select and Channel 5. All announcements come from Channel 5's transmission facility in London.

=== In-vision continuity ===
Channel 5 has only used on-screen announcers as part of its children's strand, Milkshake! which comes from studios at Hawley Crescent, London.

== Sky Showcase ==
Sky Showcase out-of-vision continuity is broadcast live in the evening as well as additional live links broadcast during the day and overnight.

== Sky Witness ==
Sky Witness out-of-vision continuity is live, as of January 2016.

== Sky Cinema ==
Sky Cinema out-of-vision continuity is live, since January 2016.

== See also ==
- List of continuity announcers in the United Kingdom
