= Radio with Pictures =

- The title card for Radio with Pictures
- Genre: Music
- Creative directors: Alan Thurston, Peter Grattan, Tony Holden, Peter Blake, Simon Morris, Brent Hansen, Andrew Shaw
- Presented by: Barry Jenkin; Phil O'Brien; Karyn Hay; Dick Driver
- Opening theme: 1970s: "Frankenstein" by Edgar Winter (middle part with drums only.); Early 1980s: "Hermann Hiess Er" by Nina Hagen; Mid-1980s: "This Heaven" by Marginal Era; Late 1980s: "Calamity" by Peter Dasent
- Ending theme: 1980s and 1990s: "Rock A Bye Baby" by Fetus Productions
- Country of origin: New Zealand

Production
- Camera setup: Multi-Camera
- Running time: one hour

Original release
- Network: TVNZ (1976-1986) then 1986-1989, 1990-1991.
- Release: 1976 – 1991

Radio with Pictures is an early music video programme, airing on New Zealand broadcaster TV2 (later South Pacific Television) from 1976 to 1989. "RadPix" aired as a weekly, late night series featuring adult and alternative music.

== History ==
In 1976, TV2 producer Peter Grattan coordinated pop clips being supplied for no charge by record companies, some of them being unsuitable for the children's or prime time schedule (from artists such as The Tubes, Sex Pistols, Stranglers, etc.) With over sixty "unusable" pop clips, Grattan proposed a late night "radio with pictures" concept to then-Head of Programmes Kevan Moore. Moore was a former producer of The C'mon Show, a popular music series in the 1960s, and had included pop clips in that program.

The concept was approved and the first thirteen half-hour episodes aired from September through December 1976. RadPix had no budget and thus no host; instead, imaginative Terry Gilliam-style graphics linked the various pop clips (in later series, similar graphics, by Fane Flaws, were used as part of the opening credits). The first clip to play was Steve Miller's "Fly Like an Eagle" and the first show also featured New Zealand band Red Hot Peppers (not to be confused with the Red Hot Chili Peppers). Subsequently, a NZ-based act was featured every week and to end the first series, Grattan produced a Keepin' It Kiwi special with ten NZ acts. RadPix also became an avenue for international acts such as Bob Marley, Little Feat, Blondie and Rainbow to gain fans, promote tours and sell records.

RadPix eventually achieved cult status, and record companies also took note: artists aired on RadPix would often see substantially increased sales. Also watching was Mike Nesmith (of The Monkees fame); in November 1976, he saw the show in a motel while on a solo NZ tour. Seeing the concept's potential, he returned to America and shared the idea with Robert Pittman. The result was, ultimately, MTV.

But in 1977, four years prior to MTV, the now popular RadPix had been allocated a small budget with producer Alan Thurston (died 2008) and its first presenter. Barry Jenkin, whose profile in New Zealand was comparable to John Peel in the UK, was passionate about the new, emerging sounds of the day. (e.g.: Neil Young: "Like a Hurricane".) It echoed the work he had been doing on his NZ radio broadcast (on Radio Hauraki). With his encyclopedic knowledge of rock and his signature "Good evening citizens" introduction, Barry Jenkin (Dr. Rock) helped give the show an alternative edge, cemented later by the arrival of punk rock, the audience for which was fanatical. Jenkin was sometimes noticeably unhappy on air when introducing clips which he believed were unsuitable for the show, particularly anything he perceived to be "too commercial".

Later producers' aims were to maximize viewers and thus ensure the series' longevity and so clips by acts like Sweet, Rod Stewart and Suzi Quatro were included. However, clips by ABBA, The Bay City Rollers and Leif Garrett were not. Later, the program expanded on the genres played, and gradually the "alternative" music itself became in a sense "more mainstream". In the 1980s, production moved from Auckland to Wellington, thus requiring new hosts: Phil O'Brien, Karyn Hay, Dick Driver and new producers; Tony Holden, then Peter Blake, Simon Morris, Brent Hansen who later became President of MTV Europe in the 1990s. Dick (Richard) Driver directed RadPix in its final years from 1986 to 1989 (replacing Hay), having been its host following his role as singer in the band Hip Singles (1982). He later became a successful independent producer of factual programmes, including Give it a Whirl, a six-part documentary series documenting the history of New Zealand popular music as well as Music Nation and Chart. In 2006 he launched the Documentary Channel on the Sky Pay TV platform. In December 2010 he sold the channel to BBC Worldwide.

Before stereo television broadcasts were commonly available, a simulcast was available on the student radio stations which are now known as b.net. In 1986, a dispute between TVNZ and RIANZ (The Recording Industry Association of NZ) contributed to the demise of RadPix, as RIANZ moved to initiate a "pay to play" rule for pop clips. TVNZ refused to pay, reasoning that the record companies benefited from the free TV exposure. The impasse was finally resolved, but in the meantime RadPix had been taken off air. The show returned to the airwaves at the end of 1986 with Dick Driver hosting, until it was cancelled again in 1989. It was revived briefly in 1990 by the original producer, Peter Grattan, when he became TVNZ's Head of Entertainment (1989–92).

== Legacy ==
Radio with Pictures championed New Zealand music for over a decade, giving dozens of "kiwi" acts valuable television exposure.

Other notable TVNZ pop clip shows have included Ready To Roll (1976-1990s) and SHAZAM! (1982–1987), the first host of which was future British television host Phillip Schofield.
