= The Broom Cupboard =

The Broom Cupboard may refer to:

- "The Broom Cupboard", episode of The Unit (season 2)
- The Broom Cupboard (Children's BBC), former studio presentation for the BBC Children's services.
