= Karyn Hay =

New Zealand broadcaster

Karyn Hay ONZM
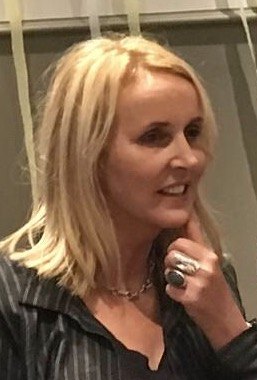
- Born: Auckland
- Occupations: Author & broadcaster

Karyn Lee Maxwell Hay ONZM (born 1959 in Auckland) is a New Zealand author and broadcaster. She came to fame as the presenter of 1980s music TV show Radio with Pictures before going on to a career in television and radio.

== Early life ==
Hay grew up in the Thames Valley dairy factory town of Waitoa, near Te Aroha. She recalls it as "Heartland New Zealand... There was this yearning all the time to break out of that." She has only dim recollections of the 60s music TV shows. She found her escape in the printed word, "... reading William Burroughs, Hermann Hesse, Jean-Paul Sartre… Coming from a town like Waitoa, that kind of literature was more expansive than any kind of drug".

== Broadcasting ==
Inspired by "the thought of arguing for a living", Hay initially applied for law school but became a cadet with Radio New Zealand instead, beginning work at 1ZH in Hamilton as a copywriter. She worked as a copywriter at Radio Hauraki, and was New Zealand's first female rock DJ.

Her television career began in 1981 when she wrote to Television New Zealand suggesting they might like a new presenter for alternative music show Radio with Pictures. Producer Peter Blake thought "she was right for the times...after the whole punk new wave thing, the music was changing, and the programme with it."

It was too much change for some of the audience. She had a New Zealand accent in an era when BBC style received pronunciation was compulsory for New Zealand television presenters, and they were required to attend elocution lessons. She either refused to attend, or was let off. Hay was the first New Zealand television presenter to speak with a New Zealand accent. Journalist Veronica Schmidt recalled that "although the BBC plum was no longer stuffed in every announcer’s mouth, appearing with an entirely raw Kiwi accent was still unheard of". Listener writer Diana Wichtel remembered her unreconstructed Kiwi vowels as "depending on your point of view, the end of civilization as we knew it or a breath of indigenous fresh air". For her part, Hay was unrepentant, telling the New Zealand Listener "I’m a New Zealander. I’m not ashamed of my New Zealand accent".

Her stint with Radio with Pictures ran for five years. She left in 1986, later recalling that, "Being a TV personality or whatever, celebrity just wasn’t me in a way… I didn’t want to be stuck".

Off-screen, she spearheaded a campaign to introduce a compulsory New Zealand music airplay quota for New Zealand radio. It resulted in a petition of 250,000 signatures being presented to Parliament. New Zealand radio stations agreed to a voluntary quota of New Zealand music content. She was the inaugural chair of the Auckland chapter of Women in Film and Television.

In 1987, Hay moved to London with partner Andrew Fagan, ex-lead singer of rock band The Mockers. The couple lived on a houseboat on the River Thames. It was here that she wrote her first novel Emerald Budgies. Hay returned to New Zealand with Fagan in 1989. They returned to England in 1996 where she had two children. She returned to television presenting in 2008 for Rocked the Nation and the 2015 documentary NZ Women in Rock.

In February 2018, Hay began a late night radio show on RNZ National Lately, With Karyn Hay. In September 2022 it was announced that Hay's show would be extended earlier into the evening to replace the departing Bryan Crump's night show.

On 13 June 2023, RNZ announced that Hay, who had been on leave since February, had resigned to "concentrate on her writing projects".

== Author ==
Hay's first novel Emerald Budgies was described in the blurb as "a darkly comic tale of drug addiction and betrayal". It was first published in England, in 2000, under the nom de plume Lee Maxwell (her middle names). She had wanted to throw off her previous public image but, on the promotional tour that followed, she said she felt like an imposter in a spy movie. "I started thinking, maybe I don't want to be this new person, maybe it's not so bad being Karyn Hay." Reviewer Kate Camp described Emerald Budgies as "raw, thoughtful and very funny". Chris Knox said it "was not for the queasy... Imagine 1980s Doris Lessing crossed with Bret Easton Ellis and you're some way to imagining what this book reads like". For Denis Welch it was "a relentlessly bleak – if extremely funny – vision of modern life with no redemption whatsoever for anyone anywhere... There are times when Emerald Budgies makes Trainspotting look like Rebecca of Sunnybrook Farm". Emerald Budgies won the NZSA Hubert Church Best First Book Award for Fiction in the 2001 Montana Book Awards. and Hay was awarded a Frank Sargeson Fellowship in 2004.

Her second novel, The March of the Foxgloves, was published in New Zealand in 2016. Set in 1893, the book touches on the 19th century trade in erotic photography. A deluxe hardcover edition included photographs by fine-art photographer Vicky Papas Vergara, featuring Australian burlesque artist Miss Sina King. The March of the Foxgloves was No. 1 on the New Zealand fiction charts.

Reviewer Dionne Christian, writing in the NZ Herald, called The March of the Foxgloves "a funny, lively and energetic romp which delves into the underbelly of society" and said Hay "has paid close attention to the settings - London, Auckland and Tauranga - period details and historical events". Stephanie Jones found Hay "a sly and delightful wordsmith, a grand raconteur of the page, in whose hands historical fiction feels utterly current, even urgent".

Her third novel, Winged Helmet, White Horse was published in New Zealand in 2018 with the NZ Listener calling Hay "a smart, gutsy writer... it’s impossible to read this book without hearing her trademark vocal delivery. She isn’t afraid of flawed characters or loose ends, and throws in plot twists you won’t see coming. Good at witty dialogue, she also takes a few comic and barbed pokes at middle-class life and the literary world".

In Spring 2018, she was a resident at the Michael King Writers Centre. Her short stories have appeared in a number of anthologies.

== Honours and awards ==
In the 2020 New Year Honours, Hay was appointed an Officer of the New Zealand Order of Merit, for services to broadcasting and the music industry.

At the 2022 Taite Music Prize, Hay was awarded the Independent Spirit Award, for her TV and radio work since the 1980s.

In November 2026 she was presented with the Scroll of Honour from the Variety Artists Club of New Zealand for her contribution to New Zealand entertainment.

== Selected works ==
=== Novels ===
- Emerald Budgies Auckland, New Zealand: Vintage, 2000. ISBN 1869414535.
- The March of the Foxgloves Auckland, New Zealand: Esom House Press, 2016. ISBN 9780473365820.
- Winged Helmet, White Horse Auckland, New Zealand: Esom House Press, 2018. ISBN 9780473443467.

== See also ==
- List of New Zealand television personalities
