= The Noise (British TV series) =

British music television series

- Genre: Music
- Presented by: Andi Peters
- Country of origin: United Kingdom
- Original language: English
- No. of series: 1
- No. of episodes: 17 (Including 1 Special)

Production
- Running time: 25 minutes
- Production company: LWT

Original release
- Network: ITV
- Release: 31 August 1996 – 4 October 1997

The Noise is a half-hour music magazine broadcast on the ITV network in the autumn of 1996. It aired between 11.00am and 11.30am on Saturdays and sat between WOW! and The Chart Show in the schedule. Like The Chart Show, it was focused on music; however, while The Chart Show was based principally on videos, The Noise featured live in-studio performances, interviews, and features.

It was presented and produced by Andi Peters, who had recently left CBBC and been put in charge of music and youth programming at LWT. The show was made by LWT from the London Studios on the south-bank and featured a variety of guests from across the musical spectrum.

The title sequence to the show depicts two middle-aged ladies enjoying tea and cakes together, while in the next room, a beat box speaker is playing a noisy tune which is disturbing both of the ladies. The loudness of the beat box causes the room to vibrate vigorously, until it breaks through the wall into the ladies' room and generates a swirl from its main speaker, sucking both of the ladies inside it as if it were a black hole. The titles were created by LWT's Bill Wilson, and the instrumental theme tune was composed by the synth-pop duo, Pet Shop Boys.

It performed poorly in the ratings and did not continue beyond its sole series; however, a special episode entitled "The Noise: Boyzone in Brazil" was produced and broadcast in 1997, the special was due to be broadcast on 6 September but was postponed due to an alternative schedule being used after the funeral of Diana, Princess of Wales and was transmitted on 4 October instead. Two years later, ITV would go on to replace The Chart Show with a studio-based music performance series, CD:UK, to significantly greater success. Andi Peters later left LWT to join Channel 4, where he developed the T4 youth strand.
