= Shazam! (New Zealand TV series) =

- Genre: Music
- Presented by: Phillip Schofield; Phillipa Dann; Michelle Bracey
- Country of origin: New Zealand
- Original language: English

Production
- Running time: 30 minutes (inc. adverts); 60 minutes (inc. adverts)
- Production company: TVNZ

Original release
- Network: Television One; Television 2
- Release: 7 April 1982 – 10 December 1987

Shazam! is a New Zealand music television programme, which ran weekly for five seasons, from 1982 to 1987. It was produced by TVNZ, which also produced the similar music show Radio with Pictures.

Shazam! was first presented by Phillip Schofield, who was joined by Phillipa Dann in 1985. Some weeks after Dann's arrival, she took over the full programme from Schofield, who continued to appear for a short time in a video vault segment (which was introduced when Dann joined the programme).

In 1986, Shazam! was extended to an hour, with Dann continuing as presenter, joined by a radio personality and a movie-preview personality. However, in April, it was announced that the Phonographic Performances N.Z. society had retired TVNZ's right to play music videos on behalf of the recording companies. Initially, Shazam! (alongside Radio with Pictures) continued their broadcasting, replacing the promo videos with music documentaries, but was briefly replaced on 20 June by True Colours, which was hosted by Dann and RadPix presenter Dick Driver. Although the dispute was over by October, it was announced that Shazam! would not return for the rest of the year.

The programme returned on 2 April 1987, with a new presenter, Michelle Bracey. At the same time, Shazam! reverted to its thirty-minutes format, but it moved on Television 2 until the end of the year. Shazam!'s final episode was broadcast on 10 December 1987.
