= Gordon the Gopher =

- First appearance: The Broom Cupboard (1985)
- Portrayed by: Chris Wright (1986–87); Warrick Brownlow-Pike (2015–present)

In-universe information
- Species: Gopher
- Gender: Male

Gordon the Gopher, also known as Gordon T. Gopher, is an English puppet gopher who first appeared on Children's BBC (CBBC) between 1985 and 1987, listed on television shows by Phillip Schofield on the interstitial or in-vision continuity programme The Broom Cupboard. He is a yellow puppet gopher with red paws.

== Career ==
=== Early work ===
Gordon's first appearances were on CBBC between 1985 and 1987, presenting television shows with Phillip Schofield on the interstitial programme The Broom Cupboard.

In 1987, Gordon and Schofield, with Sarah Greene, went on to present the Saturday morning show Going Live!. On one occasion, Gordon was famously attacked by a puppy that had been brought on to the show. In 1988, Gordon and Schofield were replaced on The Broom Cupboard by Edd the Duck and Andy Crane.

In 1991, Gordon had a series named after himself which was shown on CBBC on BBC One and BBC Two and ran from 3 January 1991 to 28 March 1991 only lasting a series of 13 episodes, appearing with his friend and colleague Phillip Schofield. The series was shown twice on BBC One, the first time being in January to March 1991 and again from 26 October to 21 December 1992 continuing where BBC Two left off at lunchtime repeats in Summer 1991, BBC Two have also repeated the series at lunchtimes four times from 18 June to 23 July 1991, 20 September to 6 December 1993, 9 March to 1 June 1994, The Christmas season of 1994 from 22 and 23 December 1994 and 17 January 1995 to 28 March 1995. It has not been repeated since 28 March 1995 on the BBC.

In 1990, he appeared on a children's programme called Scrooge – A Christmas Sarah.

=== Later work ===
During his 2005 Room 101 appearance, Schofield made an attempt to place Gordon in Room 101 (i.e., consign him to the past), but in an audience vote Gordon was spared.

On 26 February 2006, Gordon briefly appeared at the end of Channel 4's The 100 Greatest Funny Moments.

In December 2006, he returned to the screen in the Going Live! segment of the BBC special It Started With... Swap Shop.

Gordon also made a brief appearance with Schofield during a 1980s-themed edition of Dancing on Ice in February 2009. He also made a brief appearance on 5 February 2012 edition.

Gordon appeared on This Morning on 13 September 2010 to celebrate Schofield's 25th anniversary of first presenting CBBC. Schofield said "I miss him".

In September 2013, Gordon appeared on an episode of Celebrity Juice.

In August 2015, Gordon appeared in an online short where he returned to the BBC and got a job as a cleaner. In this short, he was voiced by Warwick Davis. In the September of that year he made a brief appearance in a special that aired on CBBC called Hacker’s 30th Birthday Bash when Hacker T Dog interviewed Schofield and reunited the two.

== Puppeteers ==
Gordon was operated by several people in The Broom Cupboard, but the person who did it longest was Chris Wright who also operated Gordon for the whole run of Going Live! Warrick Brownlow-Pike performed him for his appearances on This Morning and Hacker's 30th Birthday Bash.

== Influence ==
Gordon's famous leather jacket was a gift from Adam Ant, who made and decorated the jacket himself. Ant had befriended Gordon while being interviewed on Going Live! in February 1990 to promote his new single, and described Gordon as "one of the most interesting people" he'd met.

Gordon was parodied by comedian Brian Conley as "Larry the Loafer," the puppet sidekick of sarcastic children's TV presenter Nick Frisbee. The skit is one of Conley's most widely remembered, along with its catchphrase "It's a puppet!"

In 2006, Gordon was mentioned in Little Britain Abroad in the first Lou and Andy sketch. Lou tells Andy that he's planning to take him to Walt Disney World, and when Lou asks Andy who he's looking forward to meeting, Andy replies "Gordon the Gopher."
