= The Comedy Annual =

British comedy TV series

- Genre: Entertainment; Comedy
- Written by: Kevin Day; Colin Swash; Paul Powell
- Presented by: Phillip Schofield
- Starring: Jason Manford; Patrick Monahan (2011); Jason Byrne (2011); Alistair McGowan (2011); Alfie Boe (2011); Jenny Eclair (2010); Mark Watson (2010); John Bishop (2010)
- Narrated by: Dave Lamb
- Country of origin: United Kingdom
- Original language: English
- No. of episodes: 2

Production
- Executive producers: Lee Connolly; Saurabh Kakkar
- Producer: ITV Studios
- Production location: The London Studios
- Editor: Jeremy Scott
- Running time: 60 minutes (includes adverts)

Original release
- Network: ITV
- Release: 22 December 2010 – 20 December 2011

The Comedy Annual is a British entertainment comedy series that first aired on ITV on 22 December 2010. Presented by Phillip Schofield, it features various comedians who talk about unusual events of the past year. There have been two episodes, the first airing in 2010 and the second in 2011.

== Episodes ==
Episode	Date Aired	Starring
1	22 December 2010	Jason Manford; Jenny Eclair; Leigh Francis; Mark Watson; John Bishop
2	20 December 2011	Jason Manford; Patrick Monahan; Jason Byrne; Alistair McGowan; Alfie Boe
