= It's Now or Never (game show) =

- Presented by: Phillip Schofield
- Country of origin: United Kingdom
- Original language: English
- No. of series: 1
- No. of episodes: 2

Original release
- Network: ITV
- Release: 26 July – 30 December 2006

It's Now or Never is a British game show, hosted by Phillip Schofield that aired on ITV, for a period of two episodes.

== Episodes ==
The first episode was broadcast on 22 July 2006, and was notable for featuring a live marriage proposal. The second episode was eventually broadcast on 30 December 2006, which focused on a woman called Louise Holliday, desperate to prove to her closest friend, who has been fighting a serious illness – how much she cares about her.

== Cancellation ==
The series was cancelled after airing only one episode, as a result of poor ratings – 1.7 million saw the programme in its Saturday night prime time slot.

With low ratings, ITV decided to replace the following week's episode, 29 July 2006, with a repeat of outtakes show It'll Be Alright on the Night.

== See also ==
- List of television series canceled after one episode
