= Tenball =

1995 snooker tournament in London, England

Tournament information
- Dates: 8 April – 20 May 1995
- Venue: Methodist Church Hall
- City: London
- Country: United Kingdom
- Organisation: ITV, LWT
- Winner's share: £20,000

Final
- Champion: (England) Jimmy White
- Runner-up: (England) Ronnie O'Sullivan
- Score: 3–1

Tenball was a cue sports tournament that was staged only once, in 1995. It was a hybrid of snooker and pool rules and gameplay, played on a snooker table with snooker balls. An ITV/LWT TV series Tenball, hosted by Phillip Schofield, ran for one 1995 series, forming an eight-man tournament, ultimately won by Jimmy White.

== Rules ==
Colour	Value
Red	1 point
Green	3 points
Brown	4 points
Blue	5 points
Pink	6 points
Black	7 points
Black-and-yellow	10 points

Tenball table

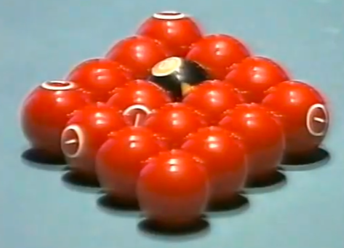
The setup at the beginning of the game, with the Tenball at the middle of the red balls in diamond rack

In front, the Tenball has a big yellow circle at the middle of the black cross with the number 10 written in white; in behind there is only the number 10 written in white on the black cross.

The game and the ITV/LWT TV series Tenball focused on a tournament that was created in 1995 by a team consisting of managers Russ Lindsay and Peter Powell, snooker player Steve Davis who devised the rules and entrepreneur Barry Hearn who was asked to do the promotion for the event to add razzmatazz to the show. The series was hosted by Phillip Schofield and its set was designed by Andy Walmsley. The sole season, in 1995, saw Jimmy White win the tournament, while Peter Ebdon achieved the highest break of 122 (out of a possible 200).

The hybrid snooker/pool game played on the show featured a pack (rack) of 16 object balls in a diamond configuration, 15 reds worth 1 each and a black-and-yellow 10 ball, as well as various colour balls with differing point values, on specific spots. The pack is not racked at the top of the table behind the pink spot as it would be in snooker, but, unlike in any other form of pool, racked in the middle of the table on the centre spot.

Games competed over for ITV's Tenball series featured best of five frame matches. However, unlike in regular snooker, the first potted colour in a break associated the score for every colour potted in that break thereafter, rather than the score of the colour that the ball that was potted. The series also promoted ball in hand similar to pool if a foul was played, or could receive ten points for each foul shot. Three consecutive fouls from a player would cause them to lose the frame.

== Prize money ==
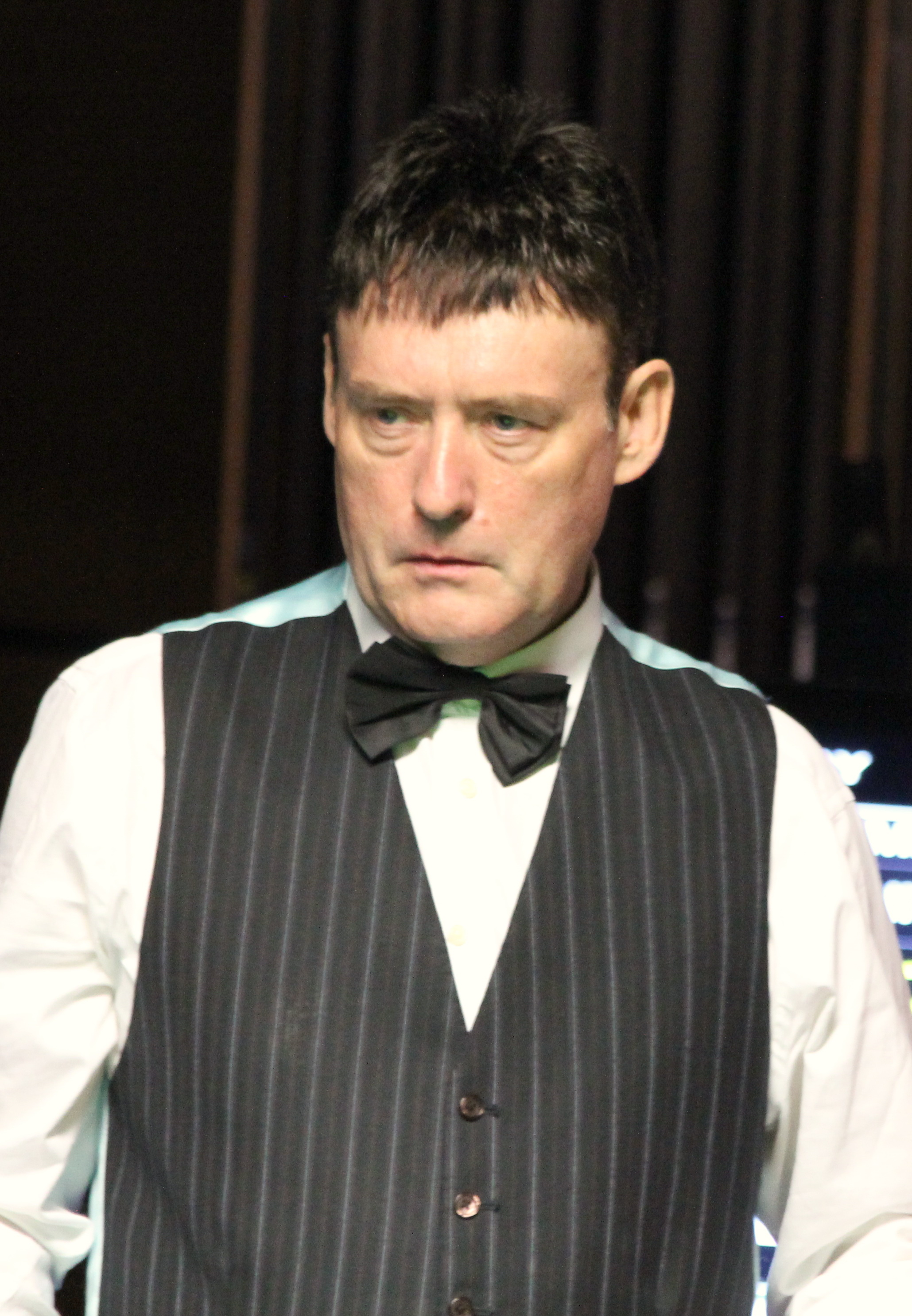
Jimmy White won the tournament, defeating Ronnie O'Sullivan in the final.

A potential £30,000 was on offer in the tournament (plus potential losers/appearance money that was not divulged), with £10,000 for a maximum break of 200, and £20,000 for the winner (Jimmy White).

== Results ==
Eight players competed in the Tenball tournament. In the semi-finals, Jimmy White defeated Tony Drago with a score of 3-1, while Ronnie O'Sullivan triumphed over Stephen Hendry with a 3-1 victory. The final saw Jimmy White emerging victorious against Ronnie O'Sullivan with a score of 3-1.

Quarter-finals; Best of 5 frames		Semi-finals; Best of 5 frames		Final; Best of 5 frames
(England) Steve Davis	1
(Malta) Tony Drago	3	(Malta) Tony Drago	1
(England) Jimmy White	3	(England) Jimmy White	3
(Northern Ireland) Alex Higgins	0			(England) Jimmy White	3
(England) John Parrott	1			(England) Ronnie O'Sullivan	1
(England) Ronnie O'Sullivan	3	(England) Ronnie O'Sullivan	3
(Scotland) Stephen Hendry	3	(Scotland) Stephen Hendry	1
(England) Peter Ebdon	1
