= Doubtful Sounds =

Community choir in Wellington, New Zealand

Doubtful Sounds is a community choir based in Wellington, New Zealand. The choir, which aims to make a beautiful sound, takes its name from the beautiful Doubtful Sound. It sings mainly a capella arrangements of popular songs. The director is Bryan Crump, who formed the choir in 2009. Crump arranges much of the music for the choir.

Crump was also for 17 years the host of a long-running radio programme on Radio New Zealand - Nights.

The choir has performed in various venues around Wellington, including St. Peter's Anglican Church, and community halls at Breaker Bay and Paekākāriki. Some notable performances have been given in unusual venues such as the stone circle at Stonehenge Aotearoa, and underground in the Wrights Hill Fortress. In 2024 the choir won a silver award for a pop ensemble in the Open Competition at the World Choir Games held in Auckland.
