= Phillip Schofield's South African Adventure =

- Also known as: Schofield's South African Adventure
- Genre: Documentary
- Directed by: Martin Harper
- Presented by: Phillip Schofield
- Starring: Stephanie Lowe
- Country of origin: United Kingdom
- Original language: English
- No. of series: 1
- No. of episodes: 3

Production
- Executive producer: Martin Frizell
- Producers: Vivek Sharma, Martin Harper
- Production location: South Africa
- Running time: 30 minutes (inc. adverts)
- Production company: ITV Studios

Original release
- Network: ITV
- Release: 24 February – 10 March 2017

Related
- Wild Ireland

Phillip Schofield's South African Adventure, is a British television documentary series, broadcast on ITV and presented by Phillip Schofield. The series was originally broadcast in segments on This Morning.

Speaking to Christine Lampard on ITV's Lorraine, Schofield said that he would love to do another series of the show.

== Production ==
In September 2016, it was announced that Schofield would star in a new TV mini-series for This Morning. Filming took place when Schofield was away during September 2016.

In February 2017 the mini series was picked up by ITV and would be aired as a 3x30 minute series in a prime time slot, the first episode aired on 24 February 2017.

== Series overview ==
| Series | Episodes | Originally released | |
| Series | Episodes | First released | Last released |
|---|---|---|---|
| 1 | 3 | 24 February 2017 | 10 March 2017 |

=== Episodes ===
Official viewing figures are from BARB.

| Episode | Original Air Date | Description | Viewers (millions) |
|---|---|---|---|
| 1 | 24 February 2017 | Diving with one of the world's most dangerous predators has long been a bucket list dream for This Morning host Phillip Schofield. In the first of three programmes, he travels to Gansbaai in South Africa to wait underwater in a cage to catch a glimpse of a great white shark up-close. But this is only part of his excursion, as together with wife Steph, he starts his trip with a walk around Cape Town, marvelling at the stunning scenery, including Table Mountain - down which Phillip intends to abseil. They also join a group of drummers to see if they can pick up some of the rhythms of this remarkable country. | Under 3.07 |
| 2 | 3 March 2017 | Phillip Schofield and wife Steph go shopping in Cape Town's Greenmarket Square, before he rides the cable car to the top of South Africa's Table Mountain and reveals the secrets of the wildlife that lives at the top. From the summit, Phillip views Robben Island, where Nelson Mandela was incarcerated and shares the inspiration that the anti-apartheid revolutionary's hope alive. He then plays daredevil by heading down the mountain via the world's highest commercial abseil, before tasting the wine at Groot Constantia, South Africa's oldest vineyard. | Under 3.01 |
| 3 | 10 March 2017 | Phillip Schofield has been lucky enough to travel the world but has never been on safari, until now. Together with wife Steph, the pair travel to a game reserve to try and catch a glimpse of their two favourite animals, giraffes and rhinos. After an early start the couple make their way into the heart of the reserve and Steph is reduced to tears as she sees a giraffe, up close for the first time. After they recover from the emotion of seeing such an incredible creature in the wild, Phillip is then invited to take part in a conservation project to protect the rhino population. | Under 3.21 |
