= Bryan Crump =

New Zealand broadcaster

- Born: 1966 (age 59–60)
- Occupation: Broadcaster
- Years active: 1993–present
- Known for: RNZ programme – Nights

Bryan Crump (born 1966) is a New Zealand radio broadcaster and choir director. He is a presenter on the RNZ Concert programme and formerly the presenter on the long running radio programme RNZ Nights, as well as the director of a community choir, the Doubtful Sounds.

== Early life ==
Crump was born in 1966 in Thames, New Zealand. He is the fourth child in the family. His father Harry was a postmaster and a singer. As a young person, Crump became interested in sound recording, and began producing radio plays and programmes with friends. In his early 20s, Crump worked for the Department of Conservation for three summers as a nature guide. He also completed a six month course in journalism, studying in Auckland.

== Career ==
Crump's early work experience in radio includes stints with Radio Active, and Access Radio.

During a period of overseas experience in London, Crump worked for trade magazines. He decided then that he wanted to work for Radio New Zealand, and began sending postcards to Sharon Crosbie, who was the chief executive at the time. In 1993, Crump gained his first position with Radio New Zealand, as a rural reporter based in Dunedin. After moving to another position with Radio New Zealand in Wellington, he produced and presented a rural programme on Saturdays, from 1995 to 1999. He then left for overseas again, and was hired by the Australian Broadcasting Corporation (ABC) as a rural reporter in the Northern Territory town of Katherine. This was followed by another position with the ABC in Darwin, hosting a breakfast programme. In 2004, Crump returned to New Zealand, to help his brothers care for their father.

Crump then became the host of Summer Nights with Radio New Zealand, and the programme was renamed as simply Nights in August 2005.

In 2022, Crump finished his long-running Nights with Bryan Crump programme, to become an afternoon presenter on RNZ Concert, commencing this new role in October.

== Awards and honours ==
Crump won the 2020 Bill Toft Awards with an entry of segment from his Nights programme recorded in March 2020, on the night before New Zealand went into lockdown in response to the COVID-19 pandemic. The Bill Toft Awards are open to New Zealand broadcasters working in online and broadcasting media. The judges for this award said about his entry:

Bryan's work delivered a sense of belonging and community, a calming connection at a time of fear and uncertainty. Bryan’s intelligent way of interviewing and relating with his audience is a pleasure to listen to, and he is a worthy winner of the Bill Toft Award.

== Doubtful Sounds choir ==
Crump formed the Doubtful Sounds choir in 2009, initially with friends and colleagues from Radio New Zealand. The choir is based in Wellington and mainly sings a cappella arrangements of popular songs. It has a current membership of around 20 singers. Crump arranges much of the music for the choir.

== Personal life ==
Crump lives and works in Wellington. He commutes to work by bike, and has a strong interest in transport. He has written about transport in Wellington in a blog The Traffic Jam.

Crump's partner is Penny Miles, a bassoonist and journalist. They have a son.
