= Andi Peters =

British television personality

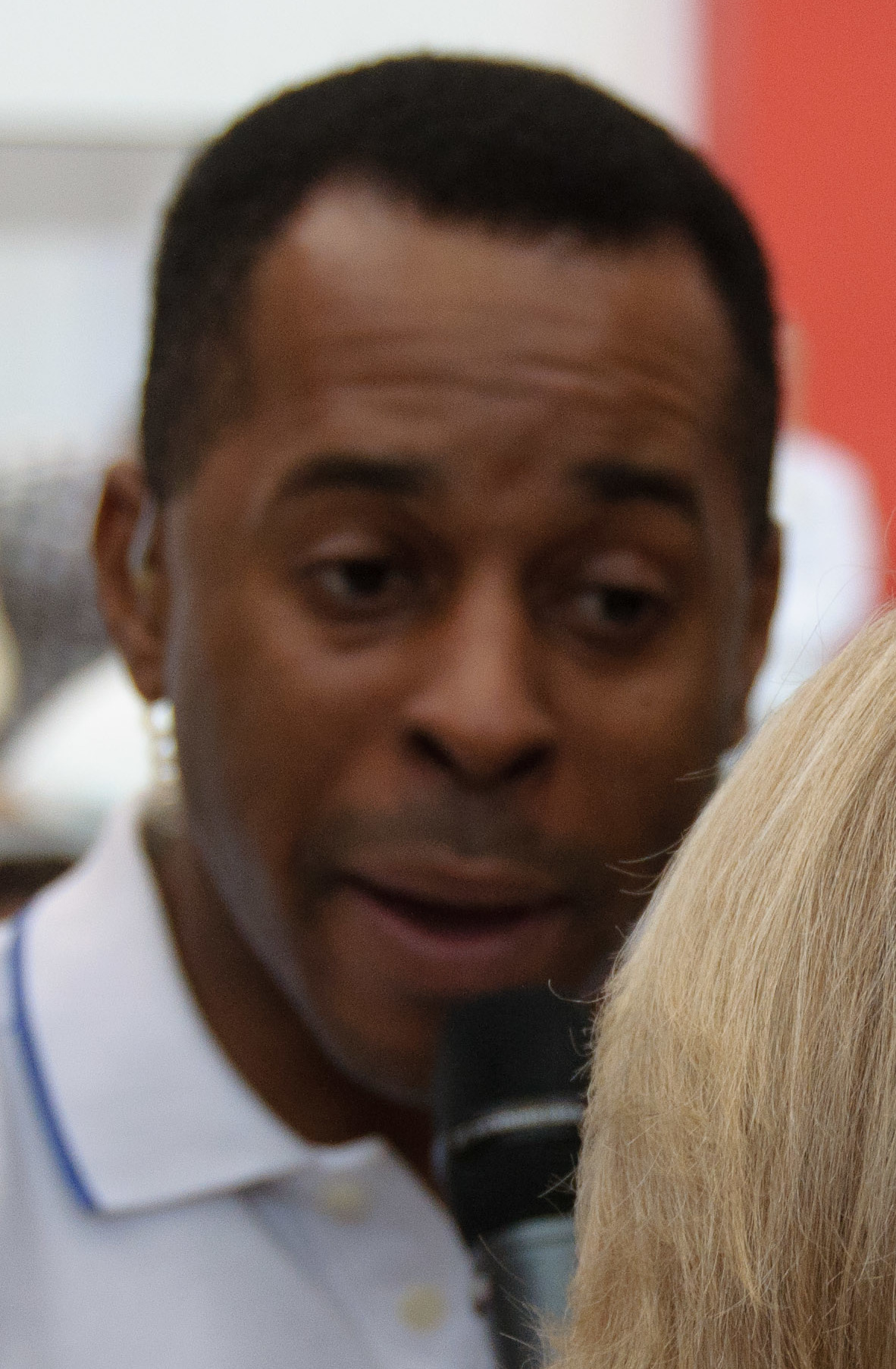
- Peters mid-conversation in 2010
- Born: Andi Eleazu Peters; 29 July 1970 (age 56); Chelsea, London, England
- Occupations: Television presenter, producer, journalist, voice actor
- Years active: 1988–present

Andi Eleazu Peters (born 29 July 1970) is a British television presenter, producer, journalist and voice actor, currently employed by ITV and known for presenting Children's BBC, children's Saturday morning show Live & Kicking, his roles on breakfast TV shows GMTV, Good Morning Britain and Lorraine, and for hosting Dancing on Ice: Extra and The Big Reunion.

He competed in the first series of the ITV skating competition Dancing on Ice. He appeared in the third series of Celebrity MasterChef finishing as runner-up behind Atomic Kitten singer Liz McClarnon.

== Career ==
=== Television ===
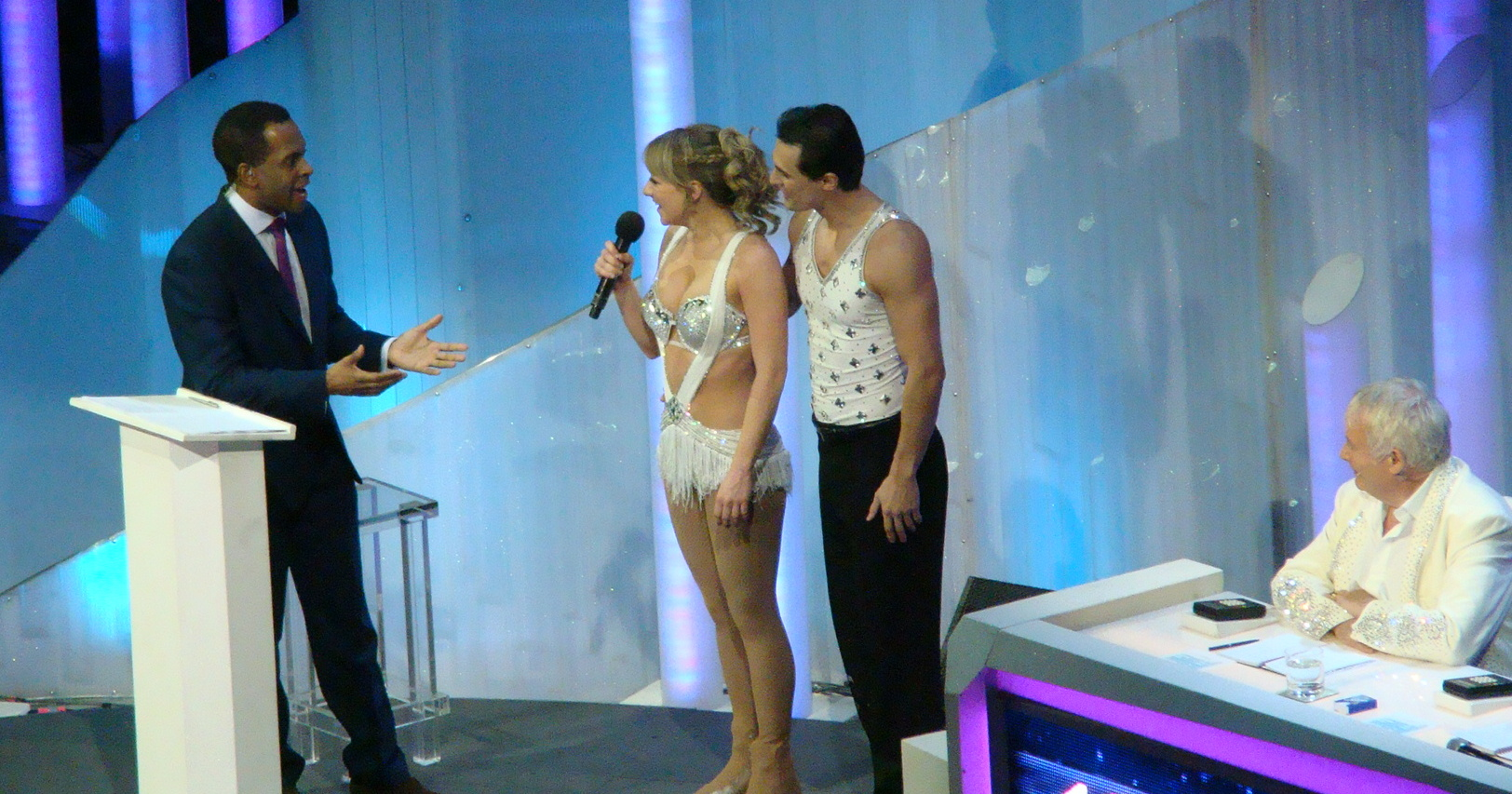
Peters presenting Dancing on Ice: The Tour in 2011 (pictured with Chloe Madeley and Michael Zenezini)

During his early television career, Andi Peters worked for ITV as a presenter for Thames Television and as in-vision continuity announcer for Children's ITV.

He was taken on by the BBC in 1989 as a presenter on Children's BBC in the so-called "Broom Cupboard", succeeding Phillip Schofield and Andy Crane. Peters was accompanied by Edd the Duck, a hand puppet with a green mohican but, contrary to popular belief, never actually manipulated the puppet. Peters hosted from the "Broom Cupboard" for just over four years, leaving in 1993. He went on to present Take Two, a BBC Children's comments programme, and BBC Children's Saturday morning television programme Live & Kicking with Emma Forbes and John Barrowman between 1993 and 1996.

Subsequently, Peters went on to work at LWT, and for Channel 4 as commissioning editor for youth and children's programmes. Among his TV producer credits are The Noise (ITV), The O-Zone (BBC), Top of the Pops (BBC) and Shipwrecked (Channel 4). He quit his position as producer of Top of the Pops in 2005 when the show was moved to BBC Two, although it was denied he was leaving because of the move and declining ratings.

In 2013 and 2014, Peters narrated the ITV2 reality series The Big Reunion, which shows the reunions of pop groups.

He appeared in the ITV daytime show Show Me the Telly a number of times towards the end of 2013. Since 28 April 2014, Peters has hosted competitions on the breakfast news programme Good Morning Britain, and also the ITV daytime game show Ejector Seat, which aired for a very short period in 2014 as a temporary replacement for Tipping Point.

He appears on Ant & Dec's Saturday Night Takeaway as a competition presenter.

From 2020 to 2021, Peters occasionally guest hosted the ITV show Lorraine.

=== Film ===
Peters had a minor part in the 1999 animated film Toy Story 2, in which he provided the voice of Male Baggage Handler #1. Director John Lasseter offered the role to him while Peters was interviewing Lasseter for a Channel 4 "making-of" documentary. Because his US work visa did not cover voiceover work, Peters had to record his line in the UK over a live broadcast to the Pixar studio.

=== Radio ===
In March 2022, Peters stood in on Virgin Radio's The Graham Norton Show while Graham Norton was away for family reasons.
