= They Who Dare (TV series) =

- Opening theme: Ennio Morricone – Falls
- Country of origin: United Kingdom
- No. of episodes: 16

Production
- Running time: 15 minutes

Original release
- Network: BBC Two
- Release: 1995 – 1996

They Who Dare is a BBC TV series that ran for two series (each of eight episodes) from 1995 until 1996. It consisted of short documentaries profiling individuals or groups who take part in extreme sports. It was produced by Tony Rayner and narrated by Terry Molloy. Many of the episodes have been repeated but none have been rebroadcast since 1998 the theme was taken from The Mission soundtrack, composed by Ennio Morricone.

== List of Episodes ==
Episode	Broadcast	Description	BBC Programme Number
1.1	12 Jan 1995 18:46-18:56 (BBC 2) 15 Feb 1995 19:49-19:59 (BBC 2 Scotland) 13 Sep 1995 18:48-18:58 (BBC 2)	Features world canoeing champion Shaun BAKER jumping his kayak 45 feet into a swirling pool just 3 feet deep as he pits himself against the torrential Sorba rapids in the Alps.	NBMW282E
1.2	19 Jan 1995 18:48-18:58 (BBC 2) 23 May 1995 20:48-20:58 (BBC 1) 02 Jun 1995 11:03-11:13 (BBC 2 Scotland) 20 Sep 1995 18:47-18:57 (BBC 2)	Greg RIFFI attempts world's longest bungee jump from a helicopter. Patrick DE GAYARDON & Franck KONRAD free fall from the Angel Falls, Venezuela.	NBMW283Y
1.3	26 Jan 1995 18:47-18:58 (BBC 2) 27 Sep 1995 18:47-18:58 (BBC 2) 01 Jul 1996 09:21-09:32 (BBC 1 Scotland)	Francisco Ferreras & Umberto Pelizzari are the 2 best breath-held divers in the world & can hold their breath underwater for 7 minutes. They are in training for a world record dive to 400 metres, with a high risk of getting the "bends".	NBMW284S
1.4	16 Feb 1995 18:49-18:59 (BBC 2) 04 Oct 1995 18:47-18:57 (BBC 2) 25 Jan 1996 21:38-21:48 (BBC 2 Scotland)	Maurizio "Manolo" ZANOLLA has become a living legend in the world of free climbing. Over the last 15 years he has made many seemingly impossible ascents, such as the climb up the southern face of Marmolada in the Italian Dolomites.	NBMW285L
1.5	23 Feb 1995 18:47-18:57 (BBC 2) 11 Oct 1995 18:45-18:55 (BBC 2) 02 Jul 1996 09:19-09:29 (BBC 1 Scotland)	Skimming the peaks of some of Europe's highest mountains top glider pilot Philippe TARADE attempts a mammoth solo flight covering over 1,000 km.	NBMW286F
1.6	02 Mar 1995 18:48-18:58 (BBC 2) 16 May 1995 20:48-20:58 (BBC 1) 09 Jul 1996 09:19-09:29 (BBC 1 Scotland)	Frenchman Pierre TARDIVEL become the world's highest skier in 1992 by descending south face of Mount Everest. Now he's on an even harder run, the north face of Mont Blanc where the gradients can be steeper than 70 degrees.	NBMW287A
1.7	16 Mar 1995 18:47-18:57 (BBC 2) 18 Oct 1995 18:47-18:57 (BBC 2) 11 Jul 1996 09:20-09:30 (BBC 1 Scotland)	Swiss hang-glider pilot Nicolas JAQUES ventures into the remote Pamir mountains of Tadshikistan to attempt breaking the current free flight distance record of 302 miles.	NBMW288T
1.8	23 Mar 1995 18:47-18:57 (BBC 2) 27 May 1996 18:45-19:00 (BBC 2)	Free-fall parachute jumper Patrick DE GAYARDON plummets from 38,000 feet without breathing apparatus, to set a new world record.	NBMW289N
2.1	11 Jan 1996 18:44-18:57 (BBC 2) 03 Jul 1996 09:21-09:34 (BBC 1 Scotland) 11 May 1998 19:14-19:27 (BBC 2)	In Mexican tropical forest, free-fall champ PATRICK DE GAYARDON attempts leap from a helicopter into 1,200 ft cavern.	NBMX701S
2.2	18 Jan 1996 18:44-18:57 (BBC 2) 04 Jul 1996 09:18-09:31 (BBC 1 Scotland) 16 Oct 1996 18:45-18:58 (BBC 2) 18 May 1998 19:14-19:27 (BBC 2)	Frenchman Alain Robert risks his life climbing skyscrapers of Paris, New York & Chicago.	NBMX702L
2.3	25 Jan 1996 18:43-18:57 (BBC 2) 23 May 1996 23:45-23:59 (BBC 2 Scotland) 08 Sep 1997 19:14-19:28 (BBC 2) 16 Jun 1998 16:45-16:59 (BBC 2)	Alessandro CRUDO scales a glacier on Mont Blanc.	NBMX704A
2.4	01 Feb 1996 18:44-18:57 (BBC 2) 27 May 1996 18:48-18:58 (BBC 2) 05 Jul 1996 09:20-09:33 (BBC 1 Scotland) 17 Jun 1997 18:29-18:42 (BBC 2) 01 Jun 1998 19:14-19:27 (BBC 2)	Alex LOUW attempts to break the world paragliding distance record in the Namibian desert.	NBMX703F
2.5	08 Feb 1996 18:44-18:57 (BBC 2) 08 Jul 1996 09:20-09:33 (BBC 1 Scotland) 17 Aug 1997 18:29-18:42 (BBC 2) 08 Jun 1998 19:14-19:27 (BBC 2)	Mike Horn & Danilo Cogrossi take part in Hydrospeed and Canyoning.	NBMX705T
2.6	15 Feb 1996 18:44-18:57 (BBC 2) 10 Jul 1996 09:20-09:33 (BBC 1 Scotland) 11 Aug 1997 19:51-20:04 (BBC 2) 15 Jun 1998 19:15-19:28 (BBC 2)	Climbing against the clock: LYNN HILL & CERVINIA DE CORSA	NBMX706N
2.7	22 Feb 1996 18:44-18:58 (BBC 2) 12 Jul 1996 09:19-09:33 (BBC 1 Scotland) 12 Jun 1997 19:14-19:28 (BBC 2) 4 May 1998 22:14-22:28 (BBC 2)	Andre RHEM, an Alpine guide & Jerome RUBY, a professional climber, weave down the 70-degree slopes of Mont Blanc with just a single edge of their snowboards preventing them from hurtling down the ice routes.	NBMX707H
2.8	29 Feb 1996 18:44-18:57 (BBC 2) 04 Sep 1996 18:45-18:58 (BBC 2 Scotland) 23 Oct 1996 18:46-18:59 (BBC 2) 20 May 1998 18:44-18:57 (BBC 2)	Mark HEWITT & Karl NEWTON base jump throughout the State of America despite the efforts of the police to stop them.	NBMX708B
