= Children's BBC presentation =

Continuity announcements during BBC children's television

CBBC co-presenters. Top row, from left to right: Dunceton, Otis the Aardvark, Edd the Duck, Hacker T. Dog, Dodge T. Dog and Emlyn the Gremlyn. Bottom row: Bobby the Banana, Gordon the Gopher and Oucho T. Cactus.

The BBC's presentation of its programmes for children was the only part of BBC One and BBC Two's television presentation where the continuity announcer appeared on the TV screen rather than as a voiceover. The services for children on BBC One and BBC Two (apart from on BBC Two on Saturday mornings) have now ended but similar presentation now takes place on the CBeebies and CBBC channels.

== History ==
In-vision presentation is as old as the first children's programme on the BBC which began on Saturday 24 April 1937. For the Children would go on to be most famously presented live by Annette Mills with her sidekick Muffin the Mule. These early shows were live performances but as the television service became more sophisticated, with the development of pre-recorded programmes and series, children's programmes went on to be introduced by the offscreen continuity announcer announcing the next programme from a small continuity booth with the usual BBC1 or BBC2 branding appearing on screen although some special branding was put in use to reflect better the audience they were serving.

In 1984, a BBC Micro B 3D Collage was introduced to generate computer generated stings for the children's strand. Such animations were used to introduce programmes, such as a spider spinning down onto a detonator triggering the words Hello from BBC1, and to link into promotions for further programmes, such as a group of sky divers falling from a plane to spell out a 'Later' caption. However, despite the graphics, programmes were still directly introduced by the BBC1 globe symbol, albeit occasionally accompanied by a choice of two different 14-note synthesized tunes.

In September 1985 a BBC press release announced the arrival of, "a new package of programmes specially gift-wrapped for children." This involved the afternoon programmes on BBC1 being rebranded as Children's BBC, alongside the continuity announcer appearing on screen (in-vision). Rather than use the existing BBC1 announcer, a new presenter was selected. The launch presenter was Phillip Schofield, presenting the slot for the first time at 3:55 on 9 September 1985.

It was not until 1994 that presentation for children's programming got its own studio space.

In 2002, when BBC Children's divided its services into CBBC and CBeebies, programmes for younger children were rebranded under the name CBeebies and the same production department began CBeebies Presentation.

Presentation across CBBC and CBeebies was suspended temporarily in September 2022 because of the death and state funeral of Queen Elizabeth II. Both channels continued to broadcast normal programming without any in-vision presentation in contrast to competitor channel CITV, which opted to simulcast ITV's funeral coverage.

== Studios ==
=== 1985–1994 ===
From its launch in 1985 until 1994, Children's BBC was presented from the regular continuity announcer's booth in the BBC1 network control area (NC1), which had a fixed camera so that the presenter could appear in vision; as it remained an operational continuity booth, the presenter would partly direct his or her own links by way of vision and sound mixers built into the studio desk.

The NC1 booth became known as "The Broom Cupboard" owing to its small size (the term was first used to refer to a smaller temporary booth, but was later retroactively applied to the main booth). The plain booth wall behind the presenter would be livened up with elements of set dressing, VT monitors and pictures sent in by viewers.

Occasionally, when Children's BBC was going out on BBC2 rather than BBC1 owing to events coverage, the presenter would be located in the BBC2 continuity booth, which was not set dressed for Children's BBC, for transmission purposes.

There were two presentation studios – larger than the "Broom Cupboard" but smaller than full programme studios – known as Pres A and Pres B. It was not initially thought economically viable to use these for daily Children's BBC links, hence the use of the "Broom Cupboard". However, by 1987, these studios were being used for the mid-morning "birthday card" slots and weekend and holiday morning strands such as But First This. The main afternoon strand remained in the "Broom Cupboard".

Initially, Children's BBC Scotland did not have a presentation studio upon launch in 1992; instead, it was presented in various locations across Scotland for the school summer holiday programming block The Ice Cream Van at the beginning. Presentation studios were eventually used for the regional breakfast and mid-morning shows when BBC Scotland opened its kids' department around the mid-1990s before finally reverting to the roof top of BBC Scotland's Queen Margaret Drive headquarters for another summer holiday children's programme, Up for It!, in the late 1990s.

In 1994, Pres A was refurbished and became the regular home for all Children's BBC presentation including the weekday afternoon block; the presenters no longer had to operate the broadcast equipment, although a "Broom Cupboard"-style area in the corner of Pres A containing its own mixer was used for the birthday slot and weekend mornings to save on crew, and the larger set allowed for more dynamic presentation, with more presenters, characters, features, games and guests. A new 3D version of the then logo of Children's BBC was commissioned to mark the move.

=== 1997 TC9 ===
In 1997, Children's BBC moved again when Pres A was decommissioned and CBBC moved to the purpose-built Studio TC9, adjacent to the Blue Peter garden at BBC Television Centre. The first broadcasts from Studio 9 were in June 1997 and this was followed in October by the launch of the new-look CBBC branding. TC9 continued to be the regular home of CBBC broadcasts on BBC One and Two until 2005 and was also used to record CBBC on Choice links between 2000 and 2002.

In 2002, TC2 became the home of CBBC Channel links, plus the channel's XChange and UK Top 40 programmes, while CBeebies operated from the smaller TC0.

In Autumn 2004, the studio arrangements for CBBC were changed again. The CBBC Channel moved from TC2 to TC9, with BBC One / Two links and the UK Top 40 show moving to TC1, located on the sixth floor of TV Centre. BBC One and Two links then moved back into TC9 alongside CBBC Channel in March 2006 as the number of studios available to CBBC was reduced.

In December 2006, there was a further reduction in CBBC facilities. A chroma key set was assembled in studio TC12, becoming the home of all CBBC links on BBC One, BBC Two and CBBC Channel until September 2007. There was also a reduction in the team of on air presenters. The last live CBBC links from TC9 were broadcast on 1 December 2006; the studio was then mothballed but was later brought back into use for individual programmes including TMi and SMart.

=== 2007 TC12 ===
On 3 September 2007, the CSO studio was dropped in a relaunch which saw a small studio set built in TC12. As part of the relaunch, new logos, presenters and idents were introduced. The design of the new "office" set has been compared to the original "Broom Cupboard", though unlike The Broom Cupboard the "office" is not a functioning continuity suite.

=== 2011 HQ5 ===
CBBC presentation originated from Studio HQ5 at Dock10, MediaCityUK in Salford Quays for the first time on 5 September 2011 as part of the relocation of the BBC's Children's department (incorporating both CBBC and CBeebies).

In 2015, the CBBC Office set received a new futuristic look, with much darker colours and tones, the light and dark greens colours replaced with purple and dark grey. Also, a new 'up next' screen was placed behind the presenter, and a post chute was installed in the new set where viewers send post to get read out live on air. There was also a new desk, larger than the previous one with multi-coloured blocks on its front.

In 2016, the CBBC Office became the CBBC HQ, incorporating a mostly orange and blue colour scheme, but later it changed to cyan and blue in 2023.

=== 2023 and 2024 ===
Another reduction in CBBC facilities occurred in December 2023. A temporary Newsround set and a chroma key set were assembled in the CBeebies HQ6 studio, with the HQ5 studio being converted to a general-purpose chroma key studio. The last CBBC studio links from HQ5 were broadcast throughout December 2023 and January 2024 alongside pre-recorded CSO links, culminating in the live launch of the chroma key studio on 12 January 2024.

== Nations opt-out ==
The Scottish school holiday opt-outs started on BBC Scotland in the mid-1970s – where the summer holiday children's schedule (seen across the BBC network for the final three weeks between mid- and late August) would be time-shifted to air throughout the first three weeks of the holidays between late June and mid-July to only viewers in Scotland owing to school holiday differences across the UK. Year-long children's programmes were introduced by the offscreen continuity announcer from a small continuity booth with the usual BBC1 or BBC2 branding appearing on screen until this was phased out from the main afternoon block in September 1985.

Despite the national Children's BBC being aired on BBC One and BBC Two across the UK since the very beginning in September 1985, BBC Scotland would go on to produce and air its regional version of CBBC in the Scottish school holidays (in the first week of July and second week of October). Those opt-outs were initially aired on BBC One Scotland from the beginning in June 1992 until October 1996, while BBC Two Scotland picked up Scottish school holiday opt-out programming for the first time in October 1994 and continuing in this medium for a further six years, ending altogether in July 2000.

=== 1970s ===
In summer 1974, BBC One Scotland started its summer holiday opt-out schedules for the very first time, on 24 June where the majority of children's programmes transmitted in the mid-morning slot (at various times between 9 and 11) were introduced out-of-vision by the Scottish continuity announcer behind the BBC 1 Scotland globe idents back then, the yearly opt-outs continued in this medium for a further eleven years before finally ending on 19 July 1985, by which point the BBC was planning to revamp its children's output by launching a newly branded children's block owing to launch on the network the following September, known as Children's BBC which would be broadcast live from The Broom Cupboard at Television Centre in London starting on 9 September 1985.

=== 1980s ===
Meanwhile, BBC Scotland launched its new weekday children's programme for the Scottish school summer holidays in the mid-1980s, the new show was billed as C.T.V.1, presented by Ross King and Rhoda McLeod that aired in the mid-morning slot on BBC One Scotland between 9:20 and 10:20 for three weeks between 7 and 25 July 1986, displacing Pages from Ceefax that was seen elsewhere around the UK at the time.

This was followed by a few years of mostly Dòtaman repeats airing before the national Children's BBC throughout the late 1980s and early 1990s, with another children's series, The McMeanies, airing directly after the 10:00 national and regional news throughout the first week of July 1989 (3–7 July at 10:00 – 10:25)

=== Early 1990s ===
In 1991, BBC Scotland started another live children's magazine programme, Breakout, that was initially aired as a couple of one-off shows in the February half-term break (18 February) and Easter holidays (29 March) between 9:05 and 10:00 on BBC One Scotland then finally aired a week-long series over the summer holidays of 1991 (1–5 July), airing at 11:05 – 11:55 on BBC One Scotland, the show was presented by Ashley Jensen and Bill Petrie.

In June 1992, BBC Scotland finally launched its regional version of Children's BBC (billed Children's BBC Scotland as an opt-out from the network) with its own presentation and presenters on a brand new school summer holiday programming block, The Ice Cream Van (a Scottish equivalent of But First This). It was presented by a team of three hosts consisting of Dòtaman's John Urquhart, Di Christie and Steve McKenna, who alternated with each other every three days by taking a trip to various locations around Scotland in the show's Ice Cream Van to introduce a line-up of TV entertainment for Scottish youngsters to brighten up their break from school, including eight episodes of Harry and the Hendersons series 1 that were yet to be screened in Scotland at the time.

Other shows in the Scottish summer holiday slot included Go 4 X with Sally Gray and Grant Stott, Class Tracks (29 June and 10 July only), By the Way with Di Christie and Steve McKenna, and the popular network pre-school favourites Playdays and Bananaman airing after the 10 o'clock national and regional news. The Ice Cream Van was aired live in the mid-morning slot on BBC One Scotland at 9:05 – 10:35 between 29 June and 10 July, the only year Children's BBC Scotland was run for the first two weeks in July.

=== Mid-1990s ===
Children's BBC Scotland returned in the summer of 1993 on BBC One Scotland, now presented by Grant Stott and Di Christie from a newly acquired presentation studio in the same mid-morning slot (9:05 – 10:35) for the first week of the summer holidays between 5 and 9 July and again in the second week of the October half-term holidays (18–22 October), starting at 9:05 with new episodes of Go 4 X in the first week of July featuring an overhauled presentation team of Lewis MacLeod, Craig McMurdo, Esther McVey and Surinder Sangray taking on hosting duties with one another in a programme full of mystery fun and adventure. Airing at the same timeslot of 9:05 over the October break was a short-lived series, GO TV, featuring pop interviews, breakfast recipes and a DIY slot forming part of early morning madness and fun with the breakfast crew.

Also airing for the first time this year was a brand new teen magazine programme, Megamag, presented by former CBBC Scotland presenter Steve McKenna and Mairi McHaffie, airing its first series across the holidays at 9:30 followed by pre-school favourites Playdays and Bump airing directly after the 10 O'clock News. This was the last year that the mid-morning slot was presented in-vision throughout the October holidays.

Grant Stott presented solo from a lunar base studio the following summer of 1994, without a co-host for the next two years, where Scottish CBBC was aired in the same timeslot (9:05 – 10:35) on BBC One Scotland between 4 and 8 July, featuring 1960s cartoon fun with The Flintstones at 9:05 am, followed by series two of Megamag with Mairi and Steve at 9:30 then pre-school programmes Playdays, Poddington Peas (4 July only) and Rupert airing after the 10 O'clock News throughout the second half-hour between 10:05 and 10:35, by which time The Flintstones was aired nationwide after CBBC on the network at 10:35 am, except for viewers in Scotland who saw the 1993 series of Hot Chefs airing directly after Scottish CBBC at the aforementioned time.

Later on in the year, Grant returned to host a new series of week-long breakfast shows airing live on BBC Two Scotland in the second week of the October half-term holidays of 1994 by linking episodes of Buzzy Bee and Friends, Poddington Peas and Teenage Mutant Ninja Turtles alongside repeats of various afternoon CBBC shows, including long-running programmes Blue Peter, Record Breakers and the recently launched Fan TC and SMart airing between 7:00 and 8:00, respectively (17–21 October), where, for the next few years, the Children's BBC breakfast show from Scotland went out at the same time as the national version broadcast from London to the rest of the UK. The October holiday mid-morning slot on BBC One Scotland was presented out-of-vision by the continuity announcers with more episodes of The Flintstones and Megamag airing between 9:05 and 10:00 throughout the same week.

In July 1995, Children's BBC Scotland returned to BBC One Scotland with Grant Stott still hosting solo on the week-long mid-morning slot in the first week of the Scottish school holidays (3–7 July), featuring the same line-up as the previous year: The Flintstones, Megamag series 3 and Playdays airing between 9:05 and 10:35, with the 10 O'clock News between Megamag and Playdays. This would be the last year of Scottish CBBC school holidays mid-morning slot being presented in-vision to viewers around the region, this was also Mairi McHaffie and Steve McKenna's last year presenting Megamag together as Grant Stott took over as main presenter mid-way through the third series in October owing to Mairi and Steve going on to pastures new by this time.

Meanwhile, The CBBC Scotland breakfast show with Grant returned to BBC Two Scotland for another week-long stint in the October half-term holidays with episodes of Lassie, The Pirates of Dark Water and repeats of Blue Peter, Fan TC and SMart airing from 7:15 to around 8:35 (16–20 October), without any pre-school programmes airing for this rare occasion, followed by the mid-morning slot being presented out-of-vision by the continuity announcers again with mostly The Flintstones (except 17 October being Barney Bear) and Megamag (now presented by Grant Stott) between 9:05 and 10:00 on BBC One Scotland across the same week.

The following year, Grant Stott was joined by new co-host Gail Porter to present Children's BBC Scotland breakfast shows on BBC Two Scotland throughout the opening weeks of the Scottish school summer holidays in early-mid July 1996, with Smurfs' Adventures, repeats of Activ8, The Really Wild Show and To Me... To You... alongside pre-school favourites Mr Benn, Secret Life of Toys and Johnson and Friends airing between 7:30 and 8:35 as the regional presenters were now on an alternating period with the network breakfast show from London (mostly seen in Scotland as with the rest of the UK) where for the first couple of weeks BBC Scotland opted out of the national version for only three days a week and aired its regional version on Monday, Wednesday and Friday mornings from 1 July to 12 July, with the network CBBC breakfast show airing as normal on Tuesday and Thursday mornings in Scotland over the summer.

Later, the mid-morning slot on BBC One Scotland was aired out-of-vision with the continuity announcers linking into episodes of Bananaman and series 4 of Megamag (presented by Grant Stott and Gail Porter) three times a week: Mondays, Wednesdays and Fridays at 9:35 – 10:10 surrounded by pre- and post-programming fillers They Who Dare and Animal Hospital Heroes airing before and after the block at 9:20 and 10:10, respectively.

Then, the regional breakfast show returned with Grant and Gail for a further week at the same timeslot (7:30 – 8:35) for five days between 14 and 18 October on BBC Two Scotland. The line-up featured Alvin and the Chipmunks, repeats of Blue Peter, Growing Up Wild and SMart, followed by pre-school favourites Tales of Aesop, Fireman Sam, Christopher Crocodile, Monty the Dog, Noddy, The Greedysaurus Gang and Spider across the week. This was the last year that Children's BBC Scotland aired its weekday morning breakfast show as a opt-out from the network.

Afterwards, the mid-morning slot returned for five days on Mondays to Fridays at 9:20 – 10:05 on BBC One Scotland throughout the October half-term holidays of 1996, featuring more episodes of Bananaman, Megamag and Funnybones being linked by the continuity announcers again. This was also to be the last time that Children's BBC Scotland holiday morning opt-outs would air on BBC One Scotland for the foreseeable future.

=== Late 1990s ===
In summer 1997, BBC Scotland opted out of the network schedule to air episodes of Harry and the Hendersons during Saturday Aardvark initially in a later time slot of 8:35 on Saturdays on BBC One Scotland for only four weeks between 24 May and 14 June. Pages from Ceefax was aired in the 7:00 slot in Scotland while episodes of The Flintstones were aired at 8:35 elsewhere in the UK throughout this short period, marking the first time ever BBC Scotland used Pages from Ceefax as an opt-out filler programme.

Two weeks later, Children's BBC Scotland underwent a revamp as it dropped its in-vision weekday morning breakfast show and mid-morning opt-outs (that been ongoing for the majority of the 1990s) and was now being presented out of vision with the continuity announcers linking into the programmes as BBC Scotland launched a brand new summer holiday children's programme, Up for It!, airing directly after the national CBBC breakfast show on BBC Two Scotland between 8:35 and 9:30 for the first three weeks of the Scottish school holidays between 29 June and 18 July. Up for It! was linked out-of-vision by the Glasgow continuity announcer throughout this short-term period, the brand new show is presented by Gail Porter from the rooftop of BBC Scotland's Queen Margaret Drive studios and featured episodes of Smurfs' Adventures that aired to Scottish viewers a month earlier compared to the rest of the UK. For the first time, no Children's BBC Scotland opt-outs were screened on BBC One Scotland in the Scottish school holidays, since they moved to BBC Two Scotland for the remainder of the late 1990s.

Throughout August, BBC Scotland opted out of the network schedule for the second time to air episodes of Harry and the Hendersons during Children's BBC H.O.T. on BBC Two Scotland at 10:00 – 10:25 instead of airing Smurfs' Adventures for the last three weeks of the month, beginning on 11 August and ending on 29 August. A Pages from Ceefax opt-out was aired at 7:00 in Scotland once again for the next three Saturdays until the end of August while one episode was aired on Bank Holiday Monday (25 August) at 7:35 – 8:00 on BBC One Scotland owing to Children's BBC H.O.T. being aired on the main channel. As it was a bank holiday, classic comedy series The Phil Silvers Show was aired in the Harry and the Hendersons timeslot in Scotland throughout the first week of September, at 9:00 – 9:25.

BBC Two Scotland opted out of the network schedule to air an episode of The Raccoons instead of airing Harry and the Hendersons that was already aired in Scotland earlier in the year. The Raccoons was aired directly after the national CBBC breakfast show at 8:45 – 9:10 on 27 October 1997 before Daytime on Two' school programmes. Warner Brothers Cartoons was then aired in the same timeslot exactly two weeks later after the national CBBC breakfast show at 8:45 – 9:10 on 10 November 1997 before Daytime on Two schools programmes once again. Harry and the Hendersons was aired in the slot before Daytime on Two school programmes across the UK except Scotland, since viewers in the region already saw the episode in August.

Up for It! returned for another run during the summer of 1998, with Marsali Stewart on hosting duties from the rooftop of BBC Scotland's Queen Margaret Drive studios, introducing episodes of Kenan & Kel, Sweet Valley High, Ocean Odyssey and The Simpsons (17 July only) that were aired in Scotland a month earlier. The second series of Up for It! aired between 29 June and 17 July in the same timeslot (8:35 – 9:35) airing directly after the national CBBC breakfast show on BBC Two Scotland. It was axed altogether after two series; Up for It! series 2 was linked with an announcer-less ident, and went straight into the show.

In August 1998, BBC Two Scotland opted out of the CBBC H.O.T. network schedule to air classic films, US-imported shows, new episodes of certain BBC shows that were yet to be screened in Scotland, and some children's series in the mid-morning slot between 9:00 and 12:00 for the final three weeks of the month (17 August – 3 September). Pre-school programmes Teletubbies, King Greenfingers, Spot the Dog, Teddy Trucks, Secret Life of Toys and Barney the Dog were among the shows aired alongside other programmes, including X-Men, Tom & Jerry Kids, Ocean Odyssey, The Flintstones and 1990s Australian TV series Sara that was displaced from the network schedule earlier in the year, also omitting shows Kenan & Kel, Sweet Valley High and some episodes of Ocean Odyssey that had already been aired in Scotland on its regional programme Up for It! the previous month.

Additionally, Bananaman was aired on BBC Two Scotland on 7 July 1998 at 12:00, after being displaced from the network schedule the previous month owing to the 1 O'clock News and Reporting Scotland moving to BBC Two Scotland to make way for World Cup football coverage on BBC One Scotland as the opening ceremony and opening match between Brazil and Scotland were held on 10 June 1998, The summer holiday mid-morning opt-out was aired on BBC One Scotland on Bank Holiday Monday (31 August) owing to children's programmes (billed as CBBC H.O.T.) and the 1950s film Anastasia being aired on the channel for one day only.

=== Early 2000s ===
There was no opt-out in 1999; however, CBBC Scotland was aired on BBC Two Scotland for the final time as a summer holiday opt-out from the network, airing with an out-of-vision continuity announcer linking into episodes of 50/50, Hyperlinks and FBi Best Bits between 10:50 and 12:00 until 7 July, by which point CBBC Scotland opt-outs were now discontinued.
