= Edd the Duck =

In-universe information
- Species: Duck
- Gender: Male

Edd the Duck (originally Ed the Duck) is a puppet duck featured on the CBBC interstitial programme The Broom Cupboard alongside presenters Andy Crane and Andi Peters.

== History ==
Wilson the Butler (left), depicted here in full, and Edd the Duck (right).

Edd the Duck first appeared in late 1988 with a bald head, which later received a green woolen mohawk made from an old Blue Peter 'Punk Teddy' by Mackay-Robinson. The character frequently expressed a desire to become a presenter on Blue Peter. His co-star and rival was Wilson the Butler, a character shown only through his visible arms. Edd's voice was performed via a duck call in such a way that the character appeared to "speak", albeit only the presenter is able to fully understand what he is saying. In cases where he appears without a presenter or another person, a "translation" of his dialogue sometimes appears using subtitles on the screen (such as in the Children in Need 'Puppet Aid' skit).

In 1990, Edd released a single titled "Awesome Dood!" and served as the official UK Olympic team mascot at the 1992 Barcelona Olympics.

During the 1990s, Edd had a fan club managed by Cravencross under Tony Hinchliffe, who held an exclusive license from BBC Enterprises.

Edd the Duck appeared in various pantomimes and short films with actors such as Bill Oddie and Gorden Kaye. On Easter Monday 2009, Edd appeared on the CBBC Channel on Easter Monday 2009 alongside Ed Petrie, with Christina Brown reprising her role as puppeteer. In 2014 Edd made an appearance on Celebrity Juice The Big Reunion special which also included Andi Peters in the Broom Cupboard.

In 2015, Edd along with Andi Peters appeared on Hacker's Birthday Bash to mark 30 years of CBBC.

Edd was later seen on November 19, 2021 during the Children in Need skit 'Puppet Aid', where he sang with Zippy and George and was assaulted by Wilson the Butler. For this appearance, he was performed by Phil Fletcher.

== Video games ==
A video game featuring Edd the Duck was developed by Zeppelin Games and initially released under their full-price Impulze label, later re-released as a budget title by Zeppelin. The game debuted in 1990 for the ZX Spectrum, Amstrad CPC and Commodore 64 and in 1991 for the Amiga. Its design was influenced by the arcade game Rainbow Islands. The ZX Spectrum version received favorable reviews, with Crash and Your Sinclair, awarding it an 83% rating. Conversely, the Amiga version was poorly received, with Amiga Power criticizing it as "one of the most primitive attempts at a platform game [they've] seen". Notably, the ZX Spectrum version contained a bug that rendered the game impossible to complete, as level 7 only provided 19 stars when 20 were needed to progress.

A sequel Edd the Duck 2: Back with a Quack! was released in 1992 on the Amiga. This sequel was even more negatively received than its predecessor, with critics describing it as one of the worst games they had encountered.

Additionally, a Game Boy game developed by Beam Software, which was an altered version of Baby T-Rex, was never released. The BBC revoked the license just before its distribution, although Game Zone magazine had already given it a negative review. A ROM of the game was leaked onto the internet as part of the 2020 Nintendo data leak.
