= Andy Crane =

English television and radio presenter

- Born: Howard Andrew Crane; 24 February 1964 (age 62); Morecambe, Lancashire, England
- Occupation: Broadcaster
- Years active: 1983–present

Howard Andrew Crane (born 24 February 1964) is an English television and radio presenter, best known for presenting Children's BBC between 1987 and 1990 and for his current work as a presenter on the Greatest Hits Radio network.

== Career ==
Crane started his career in radio before applying for Children's BBC in 1986, making his debut late that year before taking over as sole presenter from Phillip Schofield. In this role he presented the interstitial sections of the schedule through the use of in-vision continuity. Presenting from the continuity announcer's booth, nicknamed "The Broom Cupboard", Crane presented links until leaving in 1990, to be replaced by Andi Peters. In addition to Children's BBC, Crane also acted as a relief presenter on Top of the Pops in 1988 and 1989 and was thrown into the 'gunk tank' on the first Comic Relief telethon. After leaving the BBC, Crane moved to co-present the hit technology magazine Bad Influence!, for CITV, with Violet Berlin, between 1992 and 1996. He also presented Motormouth and What's Up Doc? on weekend mornings during the early 1990s. From 1997 to 1999, Crane was one of the in-vision continuity presenters on Challenge TV.

In following years, Crane presented radio programmes, breaking to present Channel M News and Channel M Today for Manchester-based Channel M, for which he received the Best Regional Presenter award at the Royal Television Society North West Awards 2009. Between January 2012 and March 2013, he presented the weekday drive time and Saturday breakfast programmes on BBC Radio Manchester.

He presented the Breakfast Show on the Bauer City 2 network every weekend from 6 am to 10 am. The show aired on AM and on DAB on Radio Aire 2, Hallam 2, Viking 2, Rock FM 2, Key Radio, Metro 2, TFM 2 and the other stations in the Bauer City 2 network.

He is a presenter for Greatest Hits Radio as of January 2019.
