= Phillip Schofield =

English television personality (born 1962)

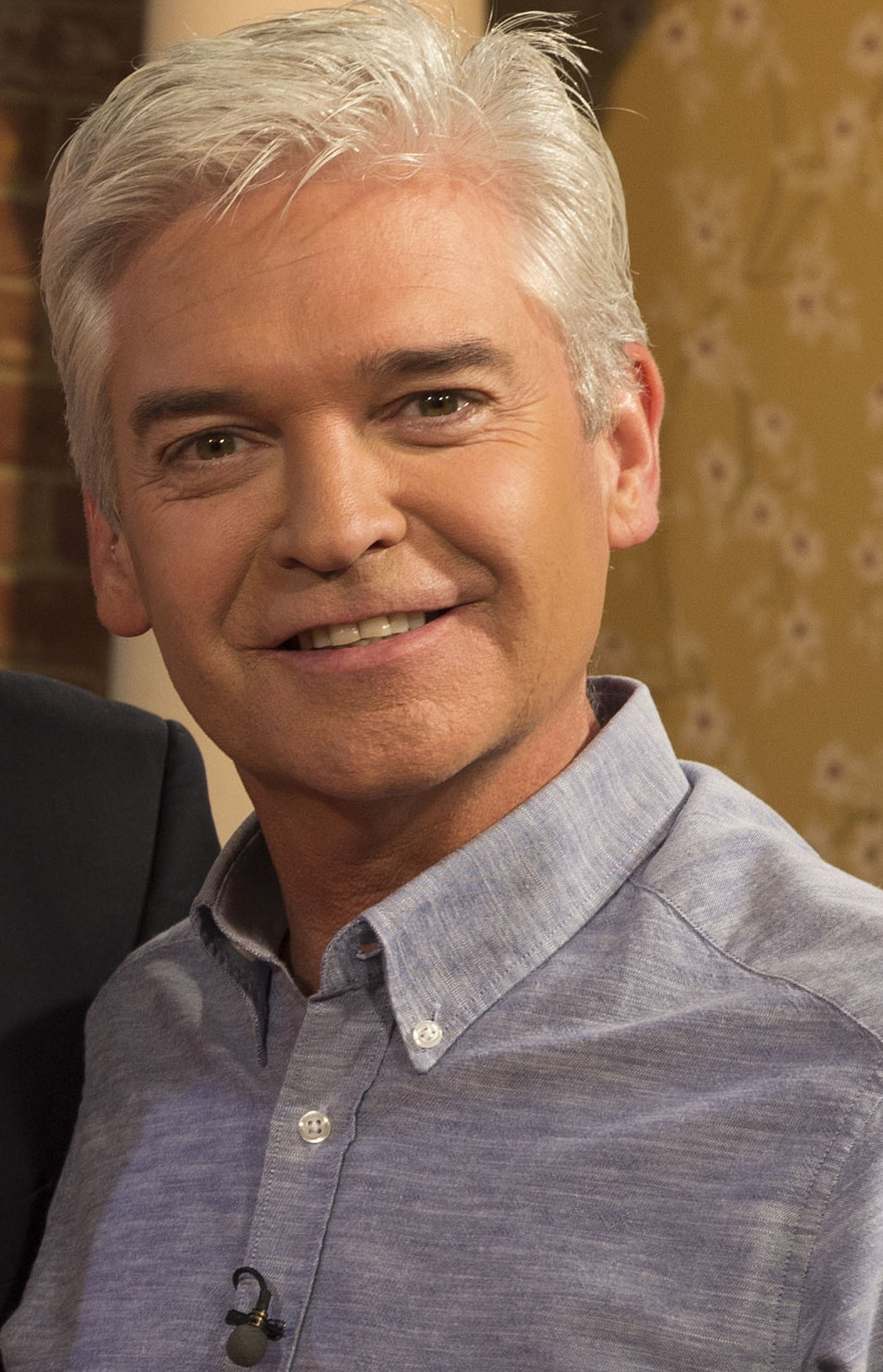
- Schofield in 2013
- Born: Phillip Bryan Schofield; 1 April 1962 (age 64); Oldham, England
- Citizenship: United Kingdom; New Zealand
- Occupation: Television presenter
- Years active: 1982–2024
- Employer(s): ITV (1993–2023); BBC (1985–1993, 2001–2006)
- Spouse: Stephanie Lowe (m. 1993; sep. 2020)
- Children: 2

Phillip Bryan Schofield (/skoʊfiːld/ SKOH-field; born 1 April 1962) is an English television presenter. He began his career as a Children's BBC continuity announcer from 1985 to 1987, and went on to present a wide range of high-profile programmes for the BBC and ITV, including Going Live! (1987–1993), This Morning (2002–2023), Dancing on Ice (2006–2014, 2018–2023), All Star Mr & Mrs (2008–2016), and The Cube (2009–2015, 2020–2021).

In February 2020, Schofield came out as gay and separated from his wife of 27 years. In May 2023, he admitted that before leaving his wife he had carried on an extramarital affair with a young male ITV co-worker. Amid extensive media coverage, Schofield resigned from ITV, was removed as an ambassador for the Prince's Trust, and was dropped by the talent agency that had represented him for over 35 years.

== Early life ==
Phillip Schofield was born on 1 April 1962, in Oldham, but moved to Newquay, Cornwall at the age of eighteen months. His father Brian H. Schofield (1935–2008) worked on Pargolla Road with Bilbo, a company which made the first surfboards in the UK. His mother, Pat Schofield, died in October 2024. He has a younger brother, Timothy Schofield, born in 1969.

Schofield attended Trenance Infant School and Newquay Tretherras School. His first job was working at a local ice-cream kiosk. Schofield often attended the Radio 1 Roadshow, which he described as "an unforgettable event when it came to town." When he was 15, Schofield's first foray into media was a Sunday show on Hospital Radio Plymouth. Despite moving so young, he says he is proud of his Lancashire roots (Oldham being in the county of Lancashire until 1974). After many years of writing letters to the BBC, at 17, Schofield took up the position of bookings clerk and tea boy for BBC Radio at Broadcasting House in London, where he was, at the time, the youngest employee.

== Television career ==
=== 1985–1993, 2001–2006: BBC presenting ===
Aged 19, Schofield moved with his family to New Zealand, where he made his television debut as the initial presenter of the youth music programme Shazam! on 7 April 1982. He also spent two years working for the Auckland-based radio station Radio Hauraki.

In 1985, he returned to Britain, where he became the first in-vision continuity presenter for Children's BBC (CBBC) on weekdays for two years from September 1985 in "The Broom Cupboard", the former studio presentation for the BBC Children's services, which introduced his friend and colleague Gordon the Gopher. Schofield left The Broom Cupboard in 1987, with Andy Crane succeeding him in the role. He then presented Going Live! on Saturday mornings between September 1987 and April 1993. From 1988 to 1991, he was the host of the Smash Hits Poll Winners Party, a pop-magazine awards show. In the early 1990s, Schofield moved to adult-orientated television with various programmes for ITV, such as Schofield's Quest, Schofield's TV Gold and Ten Ball. From 1994 to 1997, he presented Talking Telephone Numbers for five series, and in 1996 he hosted a show about remarkable coincidences called One in a Million. He co-authored the book that came out of the series.

In 1991, Schofield hosted a series named after Gordon which was shown on CBBC on BBC One and BBC Two and ran from 3 January 1991, to 28 March 1991, only lasting for a series of 13 episodes. The series was shown twice on BBC One, the first time being in January to March 1991 and again from 26 October to 21 December 1992. It continued where BBC Two left off with lunchtime repeats in Summer 1991. BBC Two have also repeated the series at lunchtimes four times from 18 June to 23 July 1991, 20 September to 6 December 1993, 9 March to 1 June 1994, and 17 January 1995, to 28 March 1995. It has not been repeated since 28 March 1995, on the BBC.

In the following decade, Schofield presented the National Lottery Winning Lines programme for BBC One between June 2001 and October 2004. Between 2002 and 2006, he co-hosted the BBC quiz show Test the Nation with Anne Robinson. In July 2006, he signed an exclusive two-year contract with ITV, reported to have been worth £5 million. The exclusive deal also meant he could no longer present Test the Nation, and he was replaced by Danny Wallace.

=== 1993–2023: ITV presenting ===
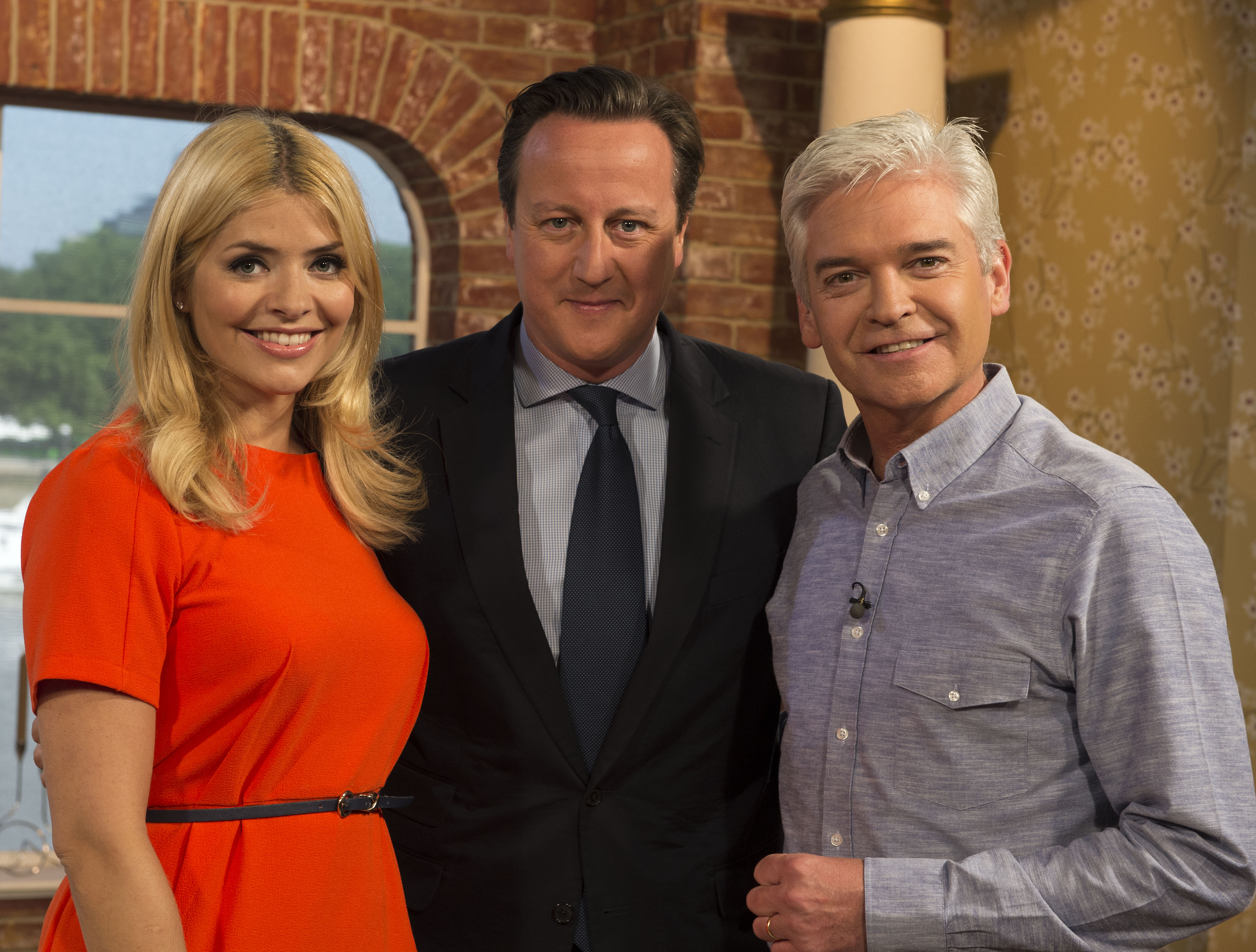
Schofield and Holly Willoughby with Prime Minister David Cameron on the set of This Morning in 2013, a programme Schofield co-presented with Willoughby between 2009 and 2023

In August 2002, Schofield became a presenter on the ITV daytime show This Morning, joining John Leslie and Fern Britton on Fridays. In October of that year, Leslie stepped aside from the programme after allegations about his personal life, and Schofield replaced him as Britton's co-host, first on a temporary and then a permanent basis. In May 2008, Schofield's father died from a long-standing heart condition, after which Schofield took a break from presenting This Morning. John Barrowman stood in for him until his return. In 2009, Holly Willoughby replaced Britton as Schofield's co-host. Schofield and Willoughby had a close friendship, with Schofield describing her as "the sister he never had", and they presented the programme together from Monday to Thursday mornings until Schofield's departure in May 2023. Willougby departed the programme in October 2023.

During his 2005 Room 101 appearance, Schofield made an attempt to place Gordon in Room 101 (i.e., consign him to the past), but in an audience vote Gordon was spared. Gordon also made a brief appearance with Schofield during a 1980s-themed edition of Dancing on Ice in February 2009. He also made a brief appearance on 5 February 2012, edition. Gordon appeared on This Morning on 13 September 2010, to celebrate Schofield's 25th anniversary of first presenting CBBC. Schofield said "I miss him". Starting in 2005, Schofield presented two series of Have I Been Here Before?, a daytime programme in which a celebrity attempted to use regression to get in touch with a previous life.

From 2006 to 2023, he presented The British Soap Awards. Between 2006 and 2008, he hosted the programme with Britton. During the run of the ITV reality show I'm a Celebrity...Get Me Out of Here!, he co-hosted the spin-off series I'm a Celebrity, Get Me out of Here! Exclusive with Sheree Murphy. The show lasted one series. In 2006, Schofield presented two episodes of the ITV game show It's Now or Never, before the network cancelled the show, due to poor ratings. In April 2008, he and Britton began hosting a revival of the ITV game show Mr and Mrs, renamed as All Star Mr & Mrs. In 2010, the show took a break but returned in 2012 without Britton.

Schofield presented Dancing on Ice on ITV with Willoughby from 2006 until 2011 and Christine Bleakley from 2012 until 2014. It was announced in the summer of 2013 that Dancing on Ice was to come to an end following the 2014 series. Schofield returned to co-present the show with Willoughby in 2018 following ITV's choice to bring the series back after four years away. From 2009 until 2015, he presented the primetime game show The Cube, which offered contestants the chance to win a top prize of £250,000. Schofield returned to present the show in 2020 following ITV's choice to reboot the series after five years away, although it was later put on hiatus again in 2022. The only winner of the series was runner Mo Farah, who successfully completed the final game on an episode of a 2012 celebrity series in which British gold medallist athletes competed for charity.

Schofield hosted A Night of Heroes: The Sun Military Awards with Amanda Holden from 2009 until 2014. In 2010 and 2011, Schofield hosted the annual comedy show The Comedy Annual on ITV. From 2011 until 2015, He co-hosted the Christmas charity show Text Santa on ITV with Bleakley in 2011, 2014 and 2015 and Willoughby in 2012 and 2013. In December 2014, he undertook a live 24-hour TV marathon to raise money for Text Santa, where, as well as appearing on This Morning, he appeared on various other programmes throughout the day, including being a guest panellist on Loose Women.

In March 2014, Schofield narrated the one-off ITV2 show Educating Joey Essex. The show was commissioned for a full series which was aired throughout 2014. The show was commissioned for a seven-part second series, filming began in April 2016, and the series aired in summer 2016 with the first episode titled "The Queen's 90th Birthday". He presented two series of the primetime game show You're Back in the Room for ITV in 2015 and 2016. In 2018, Schofield and Willoughby made a cameo appearance on Coronation Street, when they interviewed Rosie Webster, Craig Tinker and Gemma Winter on This Morning after their role in a drugs bust at Underworld.

In 2016, Schofield travelled to South Africa with his wife Stephanie Lowe, as part of a series of short clips for This Morning. Following this, ITV aired three thirty-minute episodes in a primetime slot, called Schofield's South African Adventure. Since March 2017, he has presented 5 Gold Rings, a new game show format for ITV. In 2017, Schofield presented three-part factual series How To Spend It Well at Christmas with Phillip Schofield in which he tested the latest must-have festive gifts. The series concluded in 2022.

From 2011 to 2022, Schofield was involved in several television programmes about the British royal family. In April 2011 and June 2012, Schofield co-hosted ITV's coverage of Prince William and Catherine Middleton's wedding and the Queen's Diamond Jubilee with Julie Etchingham, and in May 2018 they co-hosted ITV's coverage of Prince Harry & Meghan Markle's wedding. In 2016, Schofield worked with Prince Philip, Duke of Edinburgh on the programme When Phillip Met Prince Philip: 60 Years of The Duke of Edinburgh's Award to celebrate the 60th anniversary of the youth awards programme. Following Prince Phillip's death in April 2021, Schofield co-hosted the ITV tribute programme Prince Philip, Fondly Remembered with Etchingham. During the Platinum Jubilee of Elizabeth II, Schofield presented two programmes celebrating the occasion; first with Willoughby on This Morning at Windsor Castle and secondly the ITV programme The Queen's Platinum Jubilee Celebration, co-hosted by Etchingham.

==== David Cameron interview ====
Amid the Jimmy Savile sexual abuse scandal on 8 November 2012, Schofield interviewed then prime minister David Cameron on This Morning and presented him with a list he had obtained from the internet of five people named as paedophiles in connection with the North Wales child abuse scandal. The names of several former senior Conservative politicians were visible on the list on screen. Cameron responded by warning against a witchhunt, "particularly about people who are gay". Schofield was widely criticised for his action, with broadcaster Jonathan Dimbleby describing his behaviour as "cretinous". ITV's director of television, Peter Fincham, said that Schofield was "wrong" in confronting Cameron and the broadcaster had agreed to co-operate fully with government regulator Ofcom's investigation into the matter. The investigation was initiated after Ofcom received 415 complaints from viewers. Schofield later apologised, blaming a misjudged camera angle. Schofield and ITV later paid £125,000 compensation to settle a libel suit from one of those falsely accused, Alistair McAlpine, Baron McAlpine of West Green.

==== Boris Johnson selfie ====
In December 2019, during the 2019 general election, Schofield and Willoughby were criticised for a "giggly" interview with then prime minister Boris Johnson. The co-hosts' decision to take a selfie with Johnson was also criticised, and viewers raised a "lack of professionalism" and "clear bias". Schofield defended the stunt writing: "Can I point out that if Mr Corbyn had asked for a selfie, we would have happily obliged." Viewers argued that the pair had been more critical when interviewing Jeremy Corbyn, who faced repeated calls to apologise for accusations of antisemitism in the Labour Party. Viewers noted that Islamophobia in the Conservative Party was not raised with Johnson. Ofcom received 149 complaints.

==== Energy bills "spin to win" controversy ====
On 5 September 2022, This Morning included a new prize of "energy bills" in their regular "spin to win" game. The prize equated to four months of payments, up to £400 each month. When a contestant failed to provide the qualifying passcode on air This Morning ended the phone call, prompting Willoughby to say, "Well, we're not going to make Joyce's dreams come true." Schofield replied, "Well it's her fault." Schofield asked the first qualifying contestant if they were "worried" about energy bills and the contestant replied that "it's absolutely murder" having a prepayment meter. The inclusion of bill payments was compared to Black Mirror or The Hunger Games. Coverage from Sky News asked "Is Russia using Phillip Schofield for propaganda?" after the game was reported on Russian state television. British politician Mary Kelly Foy tweeted:

I'm disgusted that @thismorning have used people being unable to afford their energy bills as some kind of twisted gameshow. The producers need to rethink this immediately! Everyone deserves dignity, especially if they're struggling.

On 6 September 2022, Schofield referenced the controversy by saying, "I wonder how much of that they can complain about online." Ofcom received 170 complaints about the segment and it prompted widespread criticism from viewers and commentators. Ofcom's broadcasting code states that: "We would strongly advise broadcasters not to present a monetary prize as a possible resolution of financial difficulty." On 7 September 2022, the prize was removed without comment from ITV.

==== Queuegate controversy ====
Amid the Death and state funeral of Elizabeth II, Schofield and Willoughby drew criticism for not joining the Queue for the lying-in-state of Elizabeth II with the public, when filming at Queen Elizabeth II's lying-in-state in Westminster Hall on 17 September 2022. ITV said that Schofield and Willougby were escorted from the press gallery by government staff and did not file past the Queen's coffin. Social media users contrasted this with the actions of former prime minister Theresa May and other celebrities including David Beckham, Susanna Reid and Tim Vine, all of whom queued for many hours with members of the general public. Online petitions were also organised calling for the pair to be sacked.

==== Toxic culture at This Morning ====
Schofield wrote in his memoir that, in 2009, Britton accused him of meddling in the show and left because of this. Since the departure of Schofield and the revelation of his extramarital affair with a much younger male ITV co-worker, several people involved in the show have alleged a toxic culture operated. Ruth Langsford made a complaint to ITV while she worked there. Eamonn Holmes stated Schofield was "a narcissist and a bully at the centre of the toxicity." Media personality and singer Kerry Katona described it as "fake" and her interview (as a guest) by Schofield and Willoughby "belittling". Television personality and cleaner Kim Woodburn, who appeared on the show after leaving the Celebrity Big Brother house, branded Schofield and Willoughby "phoney" and "two-faced" on the show. Dr Ranj Singh said in 2023 he had made an official complaint of a toxic culture and been managed out. ITV confirmed an external adviser carried out an investigation in 2021. Former Secretary of State for Culture Nadine Dorries questioned the culture and working practices of the show. Questions over safeguarding and complaint handling by ITV were raised generally and on 14 June Carolyn McCall answered to MPs on the Culture, Media and Sport Committee. Loose Women panellist Carol McGiffin said This Morning was "tainted" and her colleagues did not like the show or Schofield's handover to them. A former production staff member also criticised the working culture which led to her resignation. Schofield, Alison Hammond and Dermot O'Leary all denied allegations of a toxic culture.

=== Return to television ===
After a 16-month break from the public eye, it was announced, on 25 September 2024, that Schofield would return on Channel 5's reality show Cast Away, which would see him left stranded on an island alone for 10 days without a film crew and filming his experience himself. The series was set to begin on 30 September and would air over three 60-minute episodes. The first episode prompted mixed reactions. Schofield suggested it would be his last television appearance. Following the final episode of the series, aired on 3 October, Schofield addressed his "haters", speaking about "toxic" people in his life and his brother Timothy. During the episode, Schofield bared his backside as he ran into the sea for a nighttime swim, in a scene that many viewers complained about on social media.

== Other ventures ==
=== Radio ===
While working as presenter of Going Live!, Schofield was also broadcasting on BBC Radio 1 with a Sunday show of the same name. When Radio 1 started to broadcast in FM stereo in 1988, Schofield was one of the presenters chosen to help with the launch.

In February 2010, Schofield launched Radio Plymouth in Devon.

=== Theatre ===
Schofield first performed on the West End stage in 1991, taking over the role of Joseph in Joseph and the Amazing Technicolor Dreamcoat from Jason Donovan. While appearing in Joseph and the Amazing Technicolor Dreamcoat, Schofield was approached to record a cover of "Close Every Door" to be released as a single. The single was released in December 1992 on Polydor Records and peaked at number 27 on the UK Singles Chart.

The second musical he performed in was the title role of Doctor Dolittle at the Hammersmith Apollo in London. He was the subject of This Is Your Life in 1998, when he was surprised by Michael Aspel at the curtain call of the musical. In 2000, Schofield toured the UK with the show. He reprised his role as Joseph for an episode of Ant & Dec's Saturday Night Takeaway in March 2018.

=== Adverts ===
Schofield did numerous adverts for the car buying service We Buy Any Car, and was also a brand ambassador for the company. He was dropped by the company in October 2022 amid criticism for Schofield and Willougby not joining the Queue for the lying-in-state of Elizabeth II with the public, and all adverts featuring Schofield were later removed from the company's YouTube channel without explanation, although the revelations about Schofield's affair in May 2023 likely resulted in the decision.

=== Book ===
Schofield released his autobiography, Life's What You Make It, on 15 October 2020. The book was issued by Penguin Books and was described as "his funny, uplifting, occasionally heartbreaking and always honest life story". It received positive reviews from fellow presenters including Lorraine Kelly, Michael Ball, Zoe Ball, Andrea McLean, Steve Wright and Chris Moyles, and newspapers including the Evening Standard and the Daily Mail.

=== Wine ===
Schofield collects Bordeaux wines, an interest kindled by Donovan. Asked in 1992 to introduce a compilation video for Donovan, Schofield refused to accept payment. He was sent two cases of Burgundy by Mike Stock, Matt Aitken and Pete Waterman with a set of tasting notes; Schofield joined the Wine Society two years later.

In 2013, Schofield began writing for the Waitrose Weekend newspaper and became the face of wine in their UK stores. In 2020, Waitrose began exclusively selling a range of Phillip Schofield–branded Italian boxed wines created by the wine company When in Rome. However, Waitrose ceased selling the Schofield wines in 2022 after negative reviews. When in Rome stopped selling the wines on its own website after revelations emerged about Schofield's affair, saying "this collaboration has drawn to a natural conclusion".

== Personal life ==
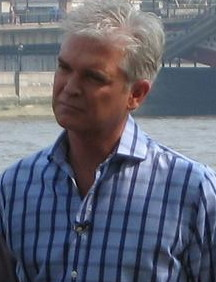
Schofield in 2007

Schofield holds dual British and New Zealand citizenship. In March 1993, at Ackergill Tower, near Wick, Caithness, he married his partner, Stephanie Lowe, whom he had met when he was twenty-five and working at CBBC, where she was a production assistant. The couple have two daughters, born in 1993 and 1996. On 7 February 2020, Schofield came out as gay via a statement posted on Instagram Stories. In a follow-up interview on This Morning, he stated that "with the strength and support of my wife and my daughters, I have been coming to terms with the fact that I am gay". He stated he had thought he was bisexual at the time he married Lowe. Schofield and Lowe separated, after which he moved out of the family home in Fawley, Buckinghamshire, and moved to Chiswick, London. They also owned a flat in the London Borough of Southwark, which they purchased in 2012 and sold in 2024. As of June 2023, Schofield and Lowe are still legally married and he continues to wear his wedding ring.

=== Affair controversy ===
Following months of speculation about his private life, and widespread reports of a feud with Willoughby, Schofield presented This Morning for the last time on 18 May 2023, after more than 20 years in the role. Two days later, he announced his departure from the programme with immediate effect, saying: "ITV has decided the current situation can't go on, and I want to do what I can to protect the show that I love." In the first broadcast after his exit, Hammond and O'Leary praised Schofield as "one of the best live television broadcasters this country has ever had". A broadcasting executive subsequently told The Times that Willoughby had given ITV an ultimatum that either she or Schofield had to leave the programme.

In a statement to the Daily Mail on 26 May, Schofield admitted that, before leaving his wife in 2020, he had carried on an extramarital affair with a younger male ITV co-worker. He had first met the co-worker while giving a talk at the drama school where the latter was then a 15-year-old student. Schofield later arranged a job interview for the co-worker at This Morning, where he was hired as a production assistant. Schofield stated that the affair had begun when the co-worker was 20 years old, at which point Schofield was in his mid-50s, and admitted lying about it to ITV's management, his colleagues, his lawyers, his agent and his friends and family. He resigned from ITV and apologised for his lies, while calling the relationship "consensual" and "unwise but not illegal."

==== Reactions ====
ITV said it had investigated rumours of a relationship between Schofield and the co-worker in early 2020, but that both men had repeatedly denied the affair. News of Schofield's affair and departure from ITV received extensive coverage in the British media. Elton John said that "If it was a straight guy in a fling with a young woman, it wouldn't even make the papers" while Jeremy Clarkson said "It seems to me he is only guilty of being what he said he was: gay." Piers Morgan also supported Schofield, saying it was time for the media to stop its "relentless persecution".

Following his resignation, Schofield gave separate interviews to BBC's Amol Rajan and The Sun in June 2023, in which he apologised to the co-worker for bringing the "greatest misery into his totally innocent life." He denied grooming the man, and said that he had lied not to protect his own career but to preserve the co-worker's privacy. He said that the two had never been in a "love affair" and were still friends. He said his career was over; he said he had "lost everything" and felt "utterly broken", embarrassed and ashamed. He claimed that if not for his daughters Ruby and Molly guarding him, he would have attempted suicide. Although he acknowledged the age difference, Schofield said he believed homophobia was a factor in the media coverage, suggesting that an affair with a woman would not have created such a scandal.

Willoughby, who had previously said she was hurt that Schofield had lied to her when she asked about the rumours, returned to This Morning on 5 June for the first time since his departure. Stating that she felt "shaken, troubled and let down," she said that everyone at the programme had given "love and support to someone who was not telling the truth." She expressed concern for Schofield's mental health, thanked viewers for their kindness and support, and said "what unites us all now is a desire to heal." Willoughby herself left This Morning five months later.

==== Impact ====
Stating that it was "deeply disappointed by the admissions of deceit" made by Schofield, ITV severed ties with him, and instructed a King's Counsel to carry out an external review of its handling of the incident. ITV confirmed that This Morning would continue without Schofield, and announced that Jane McDonald would replace him as host of The British Soap Awards. The talent agency YMU dropped Schofield after representing him for 35 years, and the Prince's Trust announced that it would no longer feature him as an ambassador, saying it was "no longer appropriate to work together." When in Rome stopped selling the Phillip Schofield brand wines on its own website after revelations emerged about Schofield's affair, saying "this collaboration has drawn to a natural conclusion".

As a result of the controversy, ITV in October 2023 began requiring all workers at the network – including staff, consultants, contractors, freelancers, apprentices, and individuals on work experience – to disclose all personal relationships with colleagues. The policy applies to co-workers in romantic or sexual relationships, but also to those who are friends or relatives, who live in the same household, or who share other close connections. Failure to comply with the policy can result in disciplinary action, including termination of employment.

==== In politics ====
The widespread reports of a feud with Schofield and Willoughby were referenced by Deputy Prime Minister Oliver Dowden in the House of Commons while deputising for Prime Minister Rishi Sunak at Prime Minister's Questions. Dowden jokingly said that Labour leader Keir Starmer and his deputy leader Angela Rayner were "the Phil and Holly of British politics", alleging that Starmer and Rayner were "at each other's throats" off camera.

=== Brother's arrest and conviction ===
In April 2023, Schofield's brother, Timothy, was found guilty of sexual offences against a teenage boy. It was revealed during the trial that Timothy had told Phillip some details of the offences in September 2021; Phillip did not report this to the police but suggested that his brother seek help from a doctor. Following the conviction Schofield said "As far as I am concerned, I no longer have a brother." In May 2023 Timothy was sentenced to 12 years' jail for child abuse.

== Honours and awards ==
Schofield was awarded the honorary degree of Doctor of Arts (D.Arts) by the University of Plymouth in 2011 for his stage and television career.

== Filmography ==
=== Television ===
Year	Title	Role	Notes
1982–1985	Shazam!	Presenter	4 series
1986–1991	Take Two	Presenter	5 series
1987–1993	Going Live!	Presenter	6 series
1988–1990	The Movie Game	Presenter	3 series
1988–1991	Smash Hits Poll Winners Party	Presenter	
1994–1996	Schofield's Quest	Presenter	
1994–1997	Talking Telephone Numbers	Presenter	4 series
1995	Tenball	Presenter	1 series
1996	One in a Million	Presenter	1 series
1998	This Morning	Guest Co-presenter	with Caron Keating
2001–2004	National Lottery Winning Lines	Presenter	4 series
2002–2006	Test the Nation	Co-presenter	17 episodes
2002–2023	This Morning	Co-presenter	Monday–Thursday
2006	I'm a Celebrity...Get Me Out of Here! Exclusive	Co-presenter	1 series
2006	It's Now or Never	Presenter	2 episodes
2006–2022	The British Soap Awards	Presenter	Annually
2006–2014, 2018–2023	Dancing on Ice	Co-presenter	13 series
2008–2009	Beat the Star	Guest presenter	2 episodes
2008–2010, 2012–2016	All Star Mr & Mrs	Presenter	8 series
2009–2014	A Night of Heroes: The Sun Military Awards	Co-presenter	6 episodes
2009–2015, 2020–2021	The Cube	Presenter	10 series
2010–2011	The Comedy Annual	Presenter	2 episodes
2011	The Royal Wedding of Prince William & Kate Middleton	Co-presenter	Alongside Julie Etchingham
2011–2015	Text Santa	Co-presenter	5 episodes
2012	The Queen's Diamond Jubilee	Co-presenter	Alongside Julie Etchingham
2014	Phillip's Live 24 Hour TV Marathon for Text Santa	Presenter	One-off special
2014–2016	Educating Joey Essex	Narrator	2 series
2015–2016	You're Back in the Room	Presenter	2 series
2016	When Phillip Met Prince Philip: 60 Years of The Duke of Edinburgh's Award	Presenter	One-off episode
2017	Schofield's South African Adventure	Presenter	Three-part documentary
2017–2020	5 Gold Rings	Presenter	4 series
2017–2023	How To Spend It Well at Christmas with Phillip Schofield	Presenter	4 series
2018	The Royal Wedding of Prince Harry & Meghan Markle	Co-presenter	Alongside Julie Etchingham
2018	How To Spend It Well: House and Garden with Phillip Schofield	Presenter	One-off special
2018	Coronation Street	Himself	Cameo
2020	The British Soap Awards Celebrates 21 Years	Narrator	One-off special
2021	Prince Philip, Fondly Remembered	Co-presenter	Alongside Julie Etchingham
2021	Ted Lasso	Himself	Cameo
2022	The Queen's Platinum Jubilee Celebration	Co-presenter	Alongside Julie Etchingham
2022	How To Spend It Well: Holiday with Phillip Schofield	Presenter	
2024	Phillip Schofield: Cast Away	Himself	3 episodes

=== Film ===
Year	Title	Role	Notes
2012	Keith Lemon: The Film	Himself	Cameo

=== Stage ===
Year	Title	Role	Notes
1992–1997	Joseph and the Amazing Technicolor Dreamcoat	Joseph	
1998–2001	Doctor Dolittle	Doctor Dolittle	At Hammersmith Apollo & toured across the UK
2016–2022	Knights of Music	Himself/host	Held annually

== Bibliography ==
- One in a Million (with Peter A. Hough, Michael O'Mara Books, 1996) ISBN 9781854792402
- Life Is What You Make It (Penguin Books, 2020) ISBN 9780241501191

=== Fun File ===
- The First Phillip Schofield Fun File (Random House Children's Books, 1988) ISBN 9780553175493
- The Second Phillip Schofield Fun File (Bantam Books, 1989) ISBN 9780553175509

=== Gordon the Gopher ===
- The Adventures of Gordon T. Gopher (Knight Books, 1989) ISBN 9780340499481
- Phillip Schofield's Gordon T. Gopher Annual (World International Publishing Ltd., 1988) ISBN 9780723568339
