= Fortune Cookies (film) =

- Directed by: Brenda Lee
- Written by: Rebecca Adams; Paul Mills
- Cinematography: Matthew Riley
- Edited by: Beatrix Grimbly
- Production company: Screen Northants
- Distributed by: Phoenix Worldwide Entertainment
- Release date: August 2024
- Country: United Kingdom
- Language: English

Fortune Cookies (also known as Meet the Lees) is a British family comedy film written and directed by Brenda Lee in her feature film debut.

== Cast ==
- Carmen Pat as Susan Lee
- Siu Hun Li as Cyril Lee
- Belinda Duong as Jenny Lee
- Helena Huang as Joan Lee
- Lucy Sheen as Grandma Bernie
- Robert Firth as Ernie Summers
- Paul Courtenay Hyu as Tony Chung
- Velton Lishke as Frank Fox
- Eric Mok as Hugh
- Isabella Speaight as Lucy
- Daphne Cheung as Penny Lau
- Gang Chi as John Lau

== Production ==
Brenda Lee's Fortune Cookies, inspired by her own 1990s upbringing and family's takeout restaurant, was originally in development in 2011 and 2012 with Reelscape Films and a different cast including Elaine Tan and David Yip, but the project did not come into fruition at the time.

Casting began in October 2019. Produced by Screen Northants with support from BBC Children in Need, principal photography took place on location in Northampton in early 2020. Filming locations included Golden Hill in Kingsthorpe among other Chinese takeaway restaurants, the Guild Hall, the Racecourse, Royal & Derngate, The Deco, and Northampton International Academy.

== Release ==
A teaser was first revealed in August 2020. Preview screenings were held at Cineworld Sixfields in Northampton on 31 January 2022 and at the Prince Charles Cinema in central London on 1 February. The film is being distributed by Phoenix Worldwide Entertainment.

In 2024, Fortune Cookies screened at the Broad Humor Film Festival.
