= King and Castle =

- Genre: Crime drama
- Created by: Ian Kennedy Martin
- Written by: Ian Kennedy Martin; Andy De La Tour; Nigel Planer
- Starring: Derek Martin; Nigel Planer; Mary Healey; Andrew Cruickshank; Laura Davenport; Rowena Roberts
- Theme music composer: Sound Lab
- Country of origin: United Kingdom
- Original language: English
- No. of series: 2
- No. of episodes: 12

Production
- Executive producer: Lloyd Shirley
- Producers: Chris Burt; Peter Duguid
- Cinematography: Philip Blowers
- Running time: 60 minutes
- Production company: Thames Television

Original release
- Network: ITV
- Release: 20 August 1985 – 14 June 1988

King and Castle is a British television crime drama series, made by Thames Television and screened on ITV, that first broadcast on 20 August 1985. The series stars Derek Martin as Ronald King, a Detective Sergeant with the Metropolitan Police, who is obliged to leave the force when he is investigated by the anti-corruption squad. His first venture outside of the police involves setting up his own Debt Collection Agency, known as 'The Manor', where he partners with mild-mannered martial arts expert David Castle (Nigel Planer).

Created by Ian Kennedy Martin, who had previously devised The Sweeney for Thames, along with Juliet Bravo and The Chinese Detective for the BBC, King and Castle started out as an episode of Thames' Storyboard, a series of stand-alone dramas intended as potential pilots for series. Described as a combination of the rough-and-tumble of The Sweeney with the knowing wit of Minder, two series of six episodes each followed in 1986 and 1988. In 1986, a paperback tie-in novel was also released to accompany the first series.

The complete series of King and Castle, including the Storyboard pilot, was released on DVD via Network in April 2011 and July 2012 respectively.

== Cast ==
- Derek Martin as Ronald King
- Nigel Planer as David Castle
- Mary Healey as Miss Willmott
- Andrew Cruickshank Mr. Hodinett
- Laura Davenport as Deidre Aitken (1986)
- Rowena Roberts as Hilary McLean (1988)
- Paul Brooke as Edward Hallday-Mostyn (1986)
- Shirley Stelfox as Betty (1988)
- Lucy Speed as Susie (1988)

== Episodes ==
=== Pilot (1985) ===
No.	Title	Directed by	Written by	Original release date
0	"King and Castle"	Richard Bramall	Ian Kennedy Martin	20 August 1985
A dissatisfied young martial artist teams up with maverick ex-cop in a new debt collecting venture.

=== Series 1 (1986) ===
No. overall	No. in series	Title	Directed by	Written by	Original release date
1	1	"Exodus"	Peter Cregeen	Ian Kennedy Martin	3 September 1986
King and Castle are asked to trace a man who has sawn his house in half following the break-up of his marriage. Meanwhile, a local villain has a score to settle with King.
2	2	"Villains"	Henry Herbert	Ian Kennedy Martin	10 September 1986
A bereaved family hire King to find a substantial some money that disappeared after their relative died in a car crash.
3	3	"Partners"	Alan Bell	Ian Kennedy Martin	17 September 1986
A man called Devas hires King and Castle to secure debts owed to him by a Rodney Finch-Courtney.
4	4	"Friends"	Peter Cregeen	Ian Kennedy Martin	24 September 1986
King and Castle turn detective when the friend of a man they are chasing for large debts is imprisoned for a robbery he did not commit. This episode featured Terence Morgan's last ever acting role; it was noted that he gave a 'haunting performance'.
5	5	"Romance"	Henry Herbert	Ian Kennedy Martin	1 October 1986
Castle pursues a woman for £10,000 of debts, but King finds himself attracted to her. King discovers Medley's long-lost son.
6	6	"Rivals"	Alan Bell	Ian Kennedy Martin	8 October 1986
Castle deals with a child custody case. A rival debt collection agency moves into the area and successfully employs strong-arm tactics.

=== Series 2 (1988) ===
No. overall	No. in series	Title	Directed by	Written by	Original release date
7	1	"Kicks"	Peter Sasdy	Ian Kennedy Martin	10 May 1988
King has a cashflow problems, and Castle and Miss Willmott are owed nearly £2,000 in back pay.
8	2	"Dim Sums"	Laurence Moody	Ian Kennedy Martin	17 May 1988
A woman dies and leaves behind a lot of I.O.U.s signed by a Tony Chen. King and Castle are hired to find him.
9	3	"Hams"	Jan Sargent	Ian Kennedy Martin	24 May 1988
Castle acquires a wonderful recipe for cooking hams. Hilary and Carol clash.
10	4	"Floppy Discs"	Peter Tabem	Nigel Planer & Andy de la Tour	31 May 1988
King is hired to help find a stolen floppy disc that contains extremely valuable information.
11	5	"Class"	Laurence Moody	Nigel Planer & Andy de la Tour	7 June 1988
A friend of King's needs a touch of class, but is King the right man for the job?
12	6	"Cons"	Jan Sargent	Ian Kennedy Martin	14 June 1988
