= Paul Courtenay Hyu =

British actor

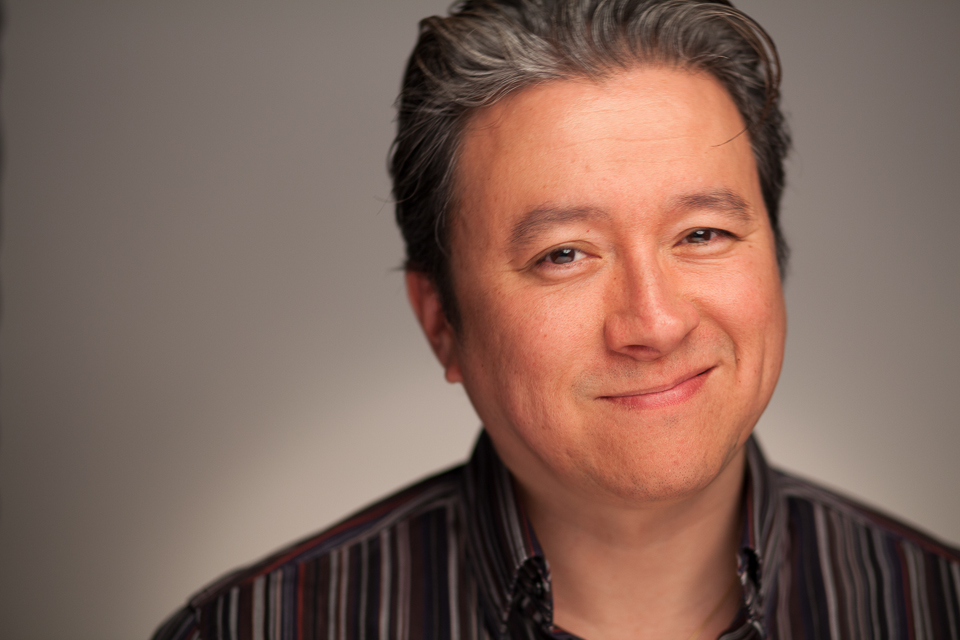
- Born: London, England
- Occupation: Actor

Paul Courtenay Hyu is a British actor. He works in English and German. He is sometimes credited as Paul Hyu, especially for his work as Elvis Impersonator, "ChineseElvis".

== Life and career ==
Hyu was born in London. He was educated at Ashville College in Harrogate, where he was Head of Briggs House and won the school's drama prize. He also won the school's German prize, though he did not continue to study the subject, instead taking Maths, Physics and Chemistry and General Studies at A-level.

He gained a place at the London Theatre School, where he studied under Barbara Buckmaster, Belinda Quirey MBE, Norman Ayrton and Charles Duff, winning Mike Loades' prize fight competition with Christopher Chaplin, son of Charlie Chaplin.

He took over as Artistic Director of the multi award-winning Mu-Lan Theatre Company from Glen Goei in 1997. Before the company closed due to a withdrawal of funding from the London Arts Board in 2005, he implemented the UK's first East Asian Youth Theatre and East Asian New Writing Programmes, working with the Shared Experience, Paines Plough and Royal Court Theatre theatre companies. He also created and wrote for the UK's first East Asian sketch comedy troupe, "Mu-Lan's Frying Circus", and he produced and directed the 1st British Chinese repertory theatre production of Shakespeare, Romeo and Juliet at Basingstoke Haymarket and Jersey Opera House, set in Shanghai in the 1930s. Under his leadership, Mu-Lan was nominated for the Manchester Evening News Awards (winner), Diverse Acts Award (winner), Carlton Multi-Cultural Achievement Award and the Peter Brook Empty Space Award. Hyu himself was nominated for a Chinese Community Pearl Award in 2006 for Excellence in Media.

Under the banner of Mu-Lan, Hyu wrote and starred in the controversial 4-part C4 satirical TV sketch show, The Missing Chink. He was Associate Producer of the UK's first British Chinese sketch comedy TV show pilot, Sweet n Sour Comedy, produced by Baby Cow Productions.

In 1999, as an actor, Hyu created the part of Timothy Wong, The Chinese Elvis in Charlotte Jones' award-winning play Martha, Josie and the Chinese Elvis at the Octagon Theatre Bolton. He went on the play the part again in 2001 with Belinda Lang in the role of Martha and again lastly in 2007 with Maureen Lipman. Hyu's performance in this part in 1999 was so popular that he received multiple offers of work as an Elvis impersonator. Living close to the famous Gracelands Palace Chinese Elvis restaurant on the Old Kent Road in South East London, Hyu started working there as "ChineseElvis", an Elvis Tribute character act, who gained some fame in the UK most notably for fronting a national advertising campaign for AOL and winning an International Elvis charity special edition of The Weakest Link, raising £5750 for the NSPCC. In 2005, Hyu went back to Harrogate to perform as ChineseElvis as part of a gala night of fundraising for the Royal Hall. Hyu stars in one of the videos made by Junkie XL for his 2002 worldwide hit remix of A Little Less Conversation. Hyu has appeared at many London venues as ChineseElvis, including the Hippodrome, London, Oxo Tower, Annabel's, The Ivy as well as The Jolly Roger party boat in Barbados. People who have hired him for private functions include Sir Bob Geldof, Angelina Jolie, Richard Caring and Justin Lin.

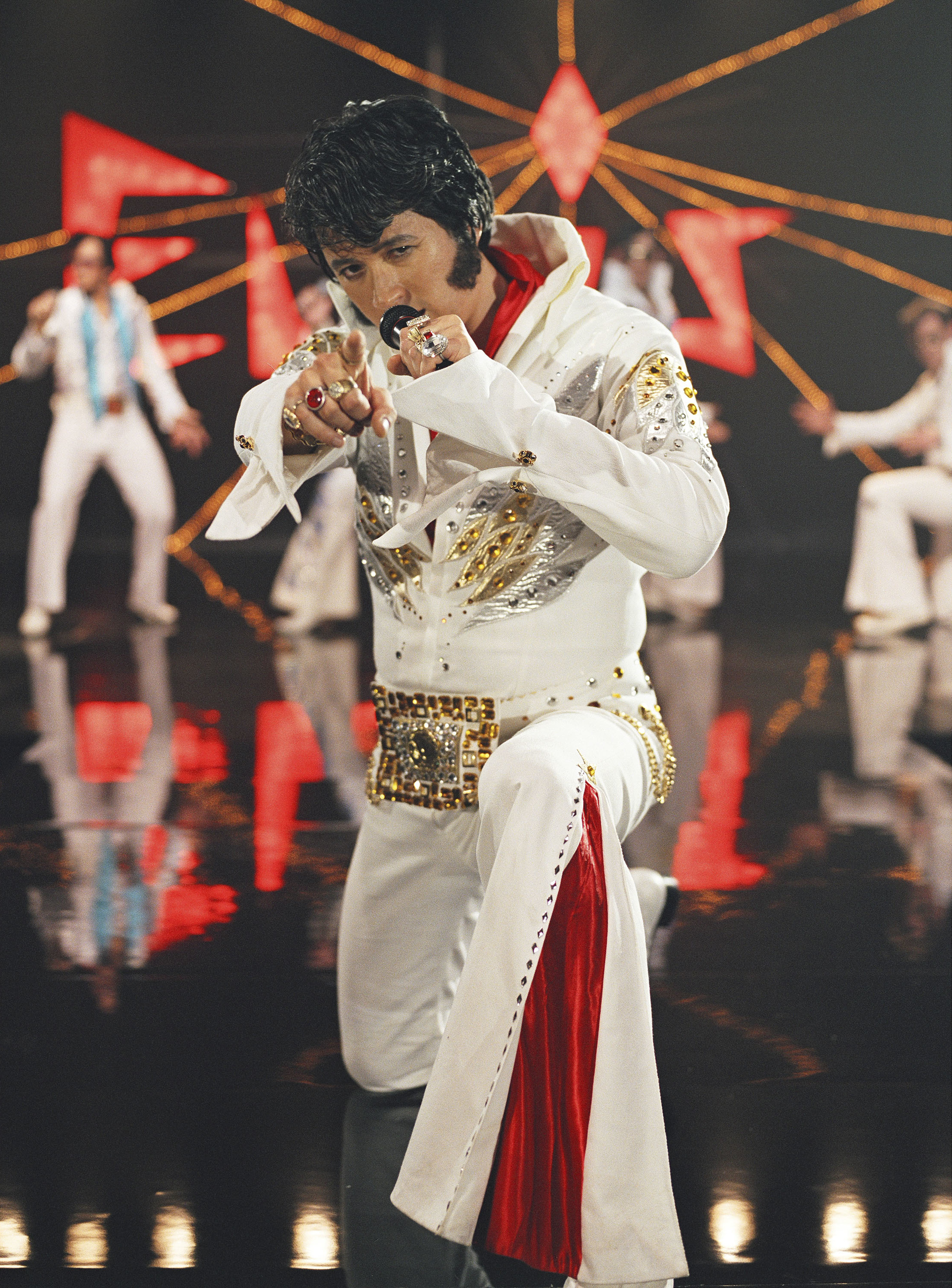
Publicity photograph of Paul Hyu as ChineseElvis, 2004

== Films ==
Year	Work	Role	Notes
2026	Meet the Lees	Tony Chung	Also known as Fortune Cookies; Screen Northants
2018	Jim Knopf und Lukas der Lokomotivführer	Wise Man IV	Warner Bros
2017	A Christmas Prince	Deputy Press Secretary	Netflix
2014	The Lovers and the Despot	Shin Sang-Ok	Hellflower
2001	The Lost Battalion	Private Stanley Chinn	A&E
1999	Wing Commander	Richardson	20th Century Fox
1999	Everybody Loves Sunshine	Ian	Gothic Films
1998	The First 9½ Weeks	Harry Long	Lions Gate
1995	Detonator 2: The Nightwatch	CIA Technician	British Lion Film

== Television ==
Year	Work	Role	Notes
2025	Brassic Series 7 episode 6	Jeremy	1 episode
2022	Doctors	Iain McDonagh	1 episode
2021	Shakespeare & Hathaway: Private Investigators Series 4 ep 9	Ben Yang	BBC production
2019	Blue Moon	Martin	Daybreak Pictures (C4) production
2018	Absentia Season 1	Erick Shen	Sony TV Networks production for Amazon Prime
2017	SOKO München	Ngo Minh Hai	UFA Fiction production for ZDF
2016	Vera Season 6 ep1	Huang	ITV production
2016	Doctor Who Episode: "Sleep No More"	Deep-Ando	BBC production
2014	Happy Valley	Mickey Yip	BBC production
2011	Not Going Out	Karaoke Host	BBC production
2009	Coronation Street	Dr. Martin	ITV production
2008	Rather You Than Me	Dr. Ling	BBC production
2008	EastEnders	Dr. Theara	BBC production
2006	Bad Crowd	Wayne	Tiger Aspect production
2005	Funland	Bryan	BBC production
2004	The Marchioness Disaster (tv film)	Jonathan Phang	ITV production
2003	The Bill	Jake Cousins	ITV production
2002	Casualty	Dr. Tom Bardley	BBC production
2001	Dr. Terrible's House of Horrible	Inspector Fong of Scotland Yard	BBC production
1995	Echt Harder	David Li	Objectiv Film GmbH production for RTL
1993	One Foot in the Grave	Youth in Takeaway	BBC production
1992	The Blackheath Poisonings	Oriental Gentleman	ITV productions

== Video games ==
Year	Work	Role	Notes
2023	RoboCop: Rogue City	Prison Warden	Also Additional voices
2019	Total War: Three Kingdoms	Yuan Shao (plus expansion pack vs Cao Cao)	SEGA
2018	Ni no Kuni II: Revenant Kingdom	World Filler Characters	English version
2012	007 Legends	Goldfinger Soldier / Breeder	Also Additional voices
2011	Driver: San Francisco	Additional Voices	
2010	James Bond 007: Blood Stone	Additional Voices	
2010	Just Cause 2	Government Pilot (lead role)	
2004	Vietcong: Purple Haze	Vietnamese Point Man (reprised role)	
2004	Vietcong: Fist Alpha	Vietnamese Point Man (reprised role)	
2003	Warhammer 40,000: Fire Warrior	Tau Trooper	
2002	Vietcong	Vietnamese Point Man (starring role)	
2001	Dropship: United Peace Force	Dropship Pilot (lead role)	
2000	Hitman (franchise)	Chinatown Voices (every voice)	

== Theatre ==
Year	Production	Role	Location
2023	Chinese Elvis presents: The Diverse Elvis Spectrum	Chinese Elvis	Colchester Arts Centre
2019	This is What Happens To Pretty Girls	Charles Lee Purvis	Pangdemonium, Singapore
2018	Othellomacbeth	Brabantio / Duncan	Lyric Theatre Hammersmith
2009	Breakfast at Tiffany's	Party Guest	Theatre Royal, Haymarket
2007	Martha, Josie and the Chinese Elvis	Timothy Wong	Birmingham Repertory Theatre, No 1 Tour
2003	US and Them	Maynard, Timothy, Waiter	Hampstead Theatre
2001	Martha, Josie and the Chinese Elvis	Timothy Wong	Watford Palace
1999	Martha, Josie and the Chinese Elvis	Timothy Wong	Octagon Theatre Bolton, Liverpool Everyman
1998	Take Away	Stephen	Lyric Theatre (Hammersmith) London
1997	The Fantasticks	Mute	Singapore Repertory Theatre, Singapore
1996	New Territories	White, Pig	Yellow Earth Theatre, London
1995	The Wind in the Willows	Rabbit, Parkinson	RNT Old Vic
1993	The Magic Fundoshi	Maid, Taro, priest	Singapore Repertory Theatre, Singapore
1993	Three Japanese Women	Hoji	Mu-Lan Theatre Company at Soho Theatre
1992–94	Miss Saigon	Phan	Theatre Royal, Drury Lane
1992	The Merchant of Venice	Lorenzo / Prince of Morocco	Sherman Theatre
1991	Hiawatha	Hiawatha	Royal Lyceum Theatre
1990–91	Titus Andronicus	Aaron	CCQ, Dusseldorf
1990	M. Butterfly	Comrade Chin	Deutsches Schauspielhaus

== Radio Drama ==
Year	Work	Role	Notes
2023	A Many Splendoured Thing	Humphrey/Third Uncle	BBC Radio 4
2021	The Fourth Doctor Adventures; Daughter of Destruction	Genghis Khan/Guard	Big Finish Productions
2020	Doctor Who: The Early Adventures	Oddiyana	Big Finish Productions
2019	Doctor Who: Wicked Sisters	Wei/Mark/Wade	Big Finish Productions
2018	Enigma of China; Inspector Chen Novels	Detective Wei	BBC Radio 4
2018	Jenny The Doctor's Daughter: Neon Reign	Po	Big Finish Productions
2017	Lights, Camera, Kidnap!	Shin Sang-Ok	BBC Radio 4
2016	Tracks	Man Seok	BBC Radio 4
2015	Dostoevsky & The Chickens	Chief	BBC radio 3
2012	Stargate SG-1: An Eye For an Eye	Lieutenant Col. Yin	Big Finish Productions
2010	The Patience of Mr Job	Mr Lucy	BBC Radio 4
2010	The Secret Pilgrim	Henry, Thug	BBC Radio 4
2010	The Honorable Schoolboy	Charlie Marshall	BBC Radio 4
2009	Rendezvous with Rama	Li Kwok	BBC Radio 4
2009	The Gold Farmer	Chao	BBC Radio 4
2008	The Letter	Ong Chi Sen	BBC Radio 4
2007	The Lover	The Lover	BBC Radio 4
2005	The Story of the Stone	Bao-Yu	BBC World Service
1991	Herge – The Adventures of Tin Tin; Tin Tin in Tibet	Chang	BBC Radio 4
