= Luo Bao Bei =

- Luo Bao Bei, Timmy and Faye
- Created by: Grace Tian
- Written by: Grace Tian
- Countries of origin: China; United Kingdom; Canada
- Original languages: Chinese; English
- No. of seasons: 1
- No. of episodes: 52

Production
- Producer: Grace Tian
- Running time: 11 minutes
- Production companies: Magic Mall Entertainment; Cloth Cat Animation; 9 Story Media Group

Original release
- Network: Milkshake!
- Release: 19 February – 1 May 2018

Luo Bao Bei (Chinese: 洛宝贝) is an animated television series, produced by "Magic Mall Entertainment" in Beijing and Cloth Cat Animation, and was distributed by 9 Story Media Group. The show follows Luo Bao Bei, a bright and spirited seven-year-old girl with a vivid imagination, on a quest to understand the world around her.

== Premise ==
The series stars a 7-year-old girl, Luo Bao Bei (also known as LBB), as she navigates childhood and the world around her. Fantasy and dreams add elements of surrealism. Since then, Luo has acted as a Beijing city spokesperson and road safety icon involved in community outreach programs.

== Characters ==
=== Main ===
- Luo Bao Bei (voiced by Hana Burnett): The main character of the series. She loves her friends, and solving problems. She likes to blow her party blower from her hair. Her friends mainly call her by her initials, Luo Bao Bei. When she does something wrong, her imaginary friend Pink Bear helps her put it right.
- Dad (voiced by Gok Wan)
- Mum (voiced by Ching He Huang)
- Grandma (voiced by Pik-Sen Lim) is the grandma of Luo Bao Bei, the wife of Luo Bao Bei's grandpa and the mother of Luo Bao Bei's mum.
- Grandpa (voiced by David Yip) is the grandpa of Luo Bao Bei, the husband of Luo Bao Bei's grandma and the father of Luo Bao Bei's mum.
- Timmy (voiced by Leo Tang) is one of Luo Bao Bei's best friends. He is the only male friend of Luo Bao Bei's friends. He is sometimes curious.
- Faye (voiced by Natalia-Jade Jonathan) is one of Luo Bao Bei's best friends. She is sometimes sensitive and stubborn.
- Pink Bear is Luo Bao Bei's imaginary friend. He is a stuffed pink bear wearing a yellow napkin tied around his neck. He helps Luo Bao Bei solve problems when she does something wrong. He pops out emoticon bubbles when he has feelings about Luo Bao Bei's troubles. He takes her to an imaginary place for Luo Bao Bei to know what is right.
- Mao Mao is Luo Bao Bei's pet cat. He loves Luo Bao Bei, but he is egotistical and always loves to nap, but loves to have fun in his imagination.
- Uncle Ray (voiced by Gok Wan) is the uncle of Luo Bao Bei, the husband of Lin and the brother of Luo Bao Bei's dad.
- Aunty Lin (voiced by Pui Fan Lee) is the aunty of Luo Bao Bei, the wife of Ray.

=== Other characters ===
- Anna (voiced by Emily May) is Timmy's cousin from Australia. She is a main character in the season 1 episode "Replaced".
- Timmy's Mum (voiced by Jessi Tang)

== Production ==
The production was acknowledged as an official project as early as 2017. The show is known for its heavy emphasis on high-level detailed environment and high quality animation.

In November 2018, Magic Mall and Cloth Cat announced that they are going to produce a second season for the series.

On 9 April 2019, 9 Story made a distribution deal with Netflix to pick up the show's “second window” rights. The show premiered on the platform on 31 August 2019.

== Episodes ==
=== Season 1 (2018) ===
| No. | Episode | Australian air date | UK air date |
|---|---|---|---|
| 1 | Staycation | 19 February 2018 | 7 May 2018 |
| 2 | Timmy and Roger | 20 February 2018 | 8 May 2018 |
| 3 | Grandma's Canary | 21 February 2018 | 9 May 2018 |
| 4 | Grandpa's Radio | 22 February 2018 | 10 May 2018 |
| 5 | Waiting for Grandpa | 23 February 2018 | 11 May 2018 |
| 6 | Moving | 26 February 2018 | 14 May 2018 |
| 7 | Grown Up Girl | 27 February 2018 | 15 May 2018 |
| 8 | Mount Mess | 28 February 2018 | 16 May 2018 |
| 9 | On The Ball | 1 March 2018 | 17 May 2018 |
| 10 | Luo Bao Bei Finds Her Rhythm | 2 March 2018 | 18 May 2018 |
| 11 | Replaced | 5 March 2018 | 21 May 2018 |
| 12 | Go Away Faye | 6 March 2018 | 22 May 2018 |
| 13 | Footsteps of Others | 7 March 2018 | 23 May 2018 |
| 14 | Faye's Special Thing | 8 March 2018 | 24 May 2018 |
| 15 | Faye's Diary | 9 March 2018 | 25 May 2018 |
| 16 | Sleepover | 12 March 2018 | 28 May 2018 |
| 17 | Waddle Squad | 13 March 2018 | 29 May 2018 |
| 18 | Lightning Bat | 14 March 2018 | 30 May 2018 |
| 19 | Luo Bao Bei the Brave | 15 March 2018 | 31 May 2018 |
| 20 | Super Scooters | 16 March 2018 | 1 June 2018 |
| 21 | It's Not Rubbish | 19 March 2018 | 4 June 2018 |
| 22 | Ping | 20 March 2018 | 5 June 2018 |
| 23 | Fish Cat 4 | 21 March 2018 | 6 June 2018 |
| 24 | The Climb | 22 March 2018 | 7 June 2018 |
| 25 | The Impossible Flute | 23 March 2018 | 8 June 2018 |
| 26 | The Art of Kindness | 26 March 2018 | 11 June 2018 |
| 27 | Mao Mao Goes Viral | 27 March 2018 | 12 June 2018 |
| 28 | Me and Mao Mao | 28 March 2018 | 13 June 2018 |
| 29 | Timmy and the Big Boys | 29 March 2018 | 14 June 2018 |
| 30 | Pink Dress Blues | 30 March 2018 | 15 June 2018 |
| 31 | The Lion Dance | 2 April 2018 | 18 June 2018 |
| 32 | Mother and Daughter Day | 3 April 2018 | 19 June 2018 |
| 33 | The Little Boss | 4 April 2018 | 20 June 2018 |
| 34 | Kiosk Chaos | 5 April 2018 | 21 June 2018 |
| 35 | Fair Friends | 6 April 2018 | 22 June 2018 |
| 36 | Space Rescue | 9 April 2018 | 25 June 2018 |
| 37 | Cold Feet | 10 April 2018 | 26 June 2018 |
| 38 | My Way | 11 April 2018 | 27 June 2018 |
| 39 | Uncle Ray's Kiosk | 12 April 2018 | 28 June 2018 |
| 40 | The Old Tree | 13 April 2018 | 29 June 2018 |
| 41 | Luo Bao Bei Super Sleuth | 16 April 2018 | 2 July 2018 |
| 42 | The Rocket | 17 April 2018 | 3 July 2018 |
| 43 | Supporting Role | 18 April 2018 | 4 July 2018 |
| 44 | Fresh Thinking | 19 April 2018 | 5 July 2018 |
| 45 | Best In Show | 20 April 2018 | 6 July 2018 |
| 46 | Diabolo Boy | 23 April 2018 | 9 July 2018 |
| 47 | Treasure Hunt | 24 April 2018 | 10 July 2018 |
| 48 | Thank You, Uncle Ray | 25 April 2018 | 11 July 2018 |
| 49 | The Perfect Picture | 26 April 2018 | 12 July 2018 |
| 50 | Stuck In The Middle | 27 April 2018 | 13 July 2018 |
| 51 | Luo Bao Bei Ace Reporter | 30 April 2018 | 16 July 2018 |
| 52 | Crossing The Line | 1 May 2018 | 17 July 2018 |

== Broadcast ==
The series mainly broadcasts on Channel 5’s Milkshake in the UK on 7 May 2018, ABC Kids in Australia on 19 February 2018, E-Junior in the United Arab Emirates and CCTV in China. The series is also broadcast on France Télévisions in France, Canal Panda in Spain and Portugal, Clan in Spain, SVT in Sweden, True Visions in Thailand and HOP! in Israel. The series premiered on Netflix in the United States on August 31, 2019. It has since been removed from Netflix in September 2024.
