= David Yip =

British actor (born 1951)

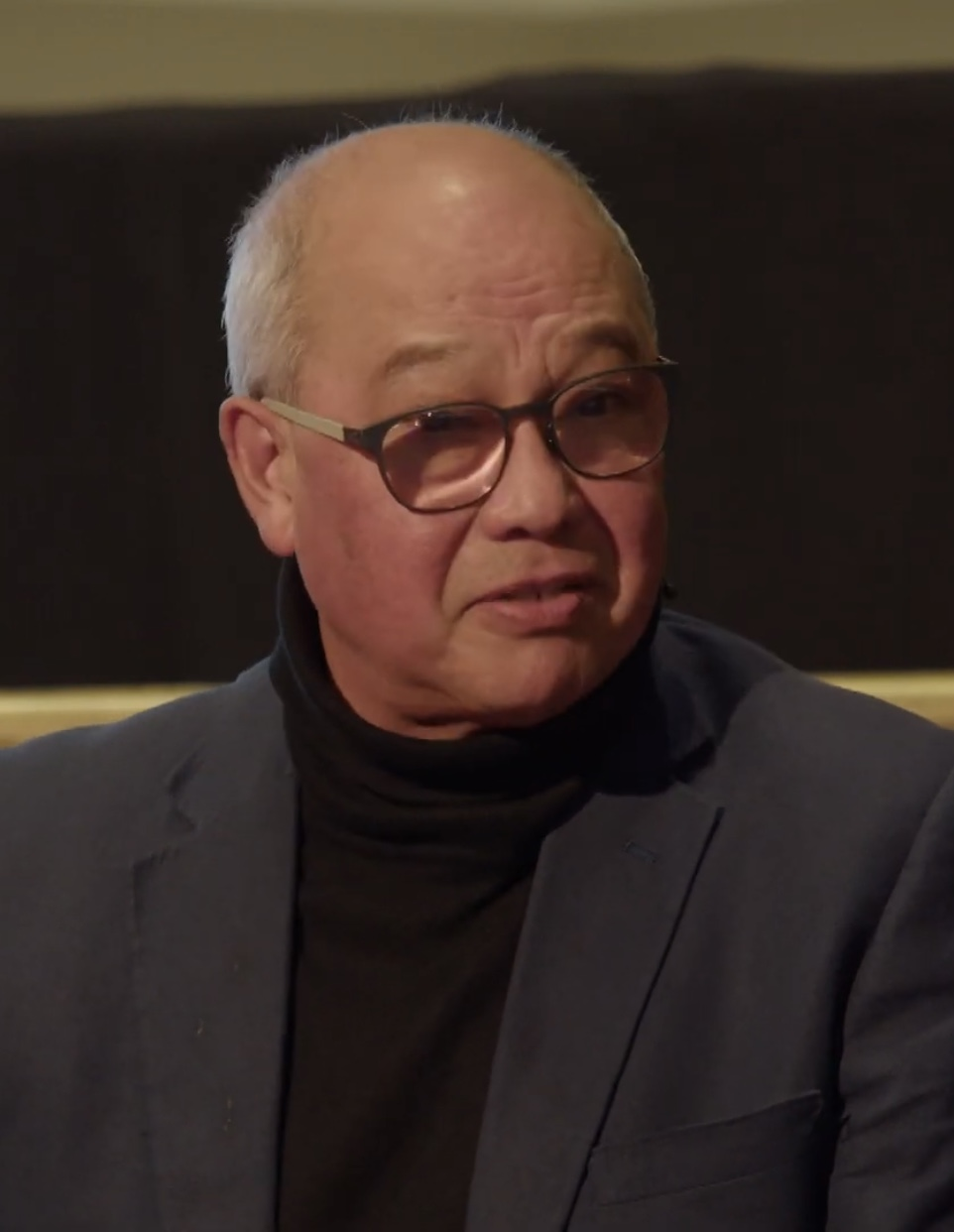
- Yip in 2022
- Born: David Nicholas Yip; 4 June 1951 (age 75); Liverpool, England
- Education: East 15 Acting School
- Occupations: Actor; playwright
- Years active: 1973–present
- Spouse(s): Lynn Farleigh (m. 1989, divorced) Virginia Yip

Chinese name
- Chinese: 葉西園
Transcriptions
Standard Mandarin
- Hanyu Pinyin: Yè Xīyuán
Yue: Cantonese
- Yale Romanization: Yihp Sāi-yùhn
- Jyutping: Jip^{6} Sai^{1}-jyun^{4}
- Sidney Lau: Yip^{6} Sai^{1}-yuen^{4}
- Website: www.davidyip.co.uk

David Nicholas Yip (Chinese: 葉西園; Cantonese Yale: Yihp Sāi-yùhn; born 4 June 1951) is a British actor and playwright. He gained prominence through his role in the BBC series The Chinese Detective (1981–1982) as the first Chinese lead on British television.

His films include A View to a Kill (1985), Ping Pong (1986), and Break (2020). Yip wrote and starred in the play Gold Mountain. On television, he appeared in the Channel 4 soap opera Brookside (1989–1990), the CBBC series Spirit Warriors (2010), and the Sky Atlantic thriller Fortitude (2017–2018). He is also known for his voice work.

Yip has given talks and presented documentaries on the Chinese community in his hometown of Liverpool. In 2022, he was awarded honorary doctorates by the University of Essex and Edge Hill University.

== Early life ==
Yip was born in Liverpool to a Chinese father, a seaman from Canton, and an English mother from Liverpool. He was one of eight children and had a working class upbringing.

After leaving school at 16, Yip worked as a shipping clerk for British Railways for 2 years. At 18, he was offered a job as an assistant stage manager by Teresa Collard at the Neptune Theatre. He participated in local youth productions while working at the Everyman, including one under the direction of Barry Kyle when he was visiting the Liverpool Playhouse. Yip's peers encouraged him to audition for drama school. He got into East 15 Acting School and went on to complete his training in 1973.

== Career ==
Yip began his career in theatre. He first appeared on television in an episode of the ITV game show Whodunnit? and the BBC television film Savages in 1975, and an episode of the BBC sitcom It Ain't Half Hot Mum in 1978. In 1979, Yip played Frank Chen in the science fiction series Quatermass, also on ITV, and had a small part in the Doctor Who story "Destiny of the Daleks".

From 1981 to 1982, Yip starred as the titular detective John Ho in the BBC police procedural The Chinese Detective, making him the first East Asian lead on British television. In a 2022 retrospective of 100 BBC gamechangers, the British Film Institute called Yip's performance "pensive and affecting". After watching him in the series, director Steven Spielberg cast Yip in the opening scene of Indiana Jones and the Temple of Doom as the Jones' past companion Wu Han, marking Yip's feature film debut. This was followed by a supporting role as CIA liaison agent Chuck Lee in the 1985 James Bond film A View to a Kill and a lead role as Mike Wong in the 1986 mystery comedy film Ping Pong.

Yip played Michael Choì in the Channel 4 soap opera Brookside from 1989 to 1990. In 1990, he appeared as a contestant on Cluedo, facing off against comedian Tony Slattery. He starred in the 1993 BBC sitcom Every Silver Lining and appeared in the television adaptation of Wilde Justice. This was followed by small roles in the films Goodbye Hong Kong (1994), Hamlet (1996), Fast Food (1998), and Entrapment (1999). He played Assad in the two-parter Arabian Nights, Merv in the film My Kingdom (2001), and Dr Pang in the CBBC series Oscar Charlie.

Yip starred alongside Chipo Chung and Gemma Chan in a production of Turandot. Yip wrote a play entitled Gold Mountain, based on his father's life. It was intended for the Liverpool Capital of Culture 2008 event, but was delayed due to writing problems. It premiered on 6 October 2010, at the Unity Theatre, Liverpool, and was performed again in 2012.

Also in 2010, Yip played Ding-Xiang in the CBBC series Spirit Warriors. In 2013, Yip joined the cast of feature film All That Remains which was released on 5 May 2016. He reunited with Gemma Chan from Turandot in the play Yellow Face at the Park Theatre and then National Theatre.

From 2017 to 2018, Yip returned to the National Theatre for The Great Wave, led the play Eastern Star at the Tara Theatre, and played Hong Mankyo in the Sky Atlantic psychological thriller Fortitude. He also had a voice role on the ABC Kids animated series Luo Bao Bei. He starred in the 2020 thriller film Break.

== Personal life ==
Yip is a practising Nichiren Buddhist and member of the Soka Gakkai International. He lives in north Oxfordshire near Banbury with his wife Virginia and their dog Buddy. His brother Stephen Yip stood as an independent candidate in the 2021 Liverpool mayoral election.

Yip only adopted his Chinese name, coined by friends, as an adult whilst working on a film in Hong Kong.

== Filmography ==
=== Film ===
Year	Title	Role	Notes
1984	Indiana Jones and the Temple of Doom	Wu Han	
1985	A View to a Kill	Chuck Lee	
1986	Ping Pong	Mike Wong	
1987	Out of Order	Policeman	
1990	Blue Funnel	Daniel	Short film
1994	Goodbye Hong Kong	Peter Ma	
1996	Hamlet	Sailor One	
1999	Fast Food	Mr Fortune	
1999	Entrapment	Chief of Police	
2000	Chinese Whispers	—N/a	Director, writer Short film
2001	My Kingdom	Merv	
2005	Zoltan the Great	Dak	Short film
2008	Act of Grace	Kai	
2009	The School That Roared	Winnie's Dad	
2011	Re-Evolution	Councillor	
2016	The Sea, the God, the Man	God	Short film
2016	All That Remains	Noburu Nagai	
2017	Dystopian: Lovesong	Ian Dystop	Short film
2017	Emper	Zhang	
2018	Dim Sum	Mr Chen	Short film
2020	Break	Vincent Qiang	
TBA	Sigh of the Sea		
TBA	Dream Hacker	Wang Lei	

=== Television ===
Year	Title	Role	Notes
1975	Whodunnit?	Ray Hunt	Episode: "Portrait in Black"
1978	Savages	Kumai	Television film
1978	It Ain't Half Hot Mum	Bandit	Episode: "The Great Payroll Snatch"
1979	Doctor Who	Veldan	Destiny of the Daleks; 2 episodes
1979	Quatermass	Frank Chen	2 episodes
1979	The Quatermass Conclusion	Frank Chen	Television film
1980	Spy!	Ito Ritsui	Episode: "The Tokyo Ring"
1980	The Cuckoo Waltz	Mr Ling	Episode: "The Neighbour"
1980	The Mystery of the Disappearing Schoolgirls	Quintus	Television film
1981	Armchair Thriller	Denny	Episode: "The Chelsea Murders"
1981–1982	The Chinese Detective	Detective Sergeant John Ho	Lead role
1982	The Professionals	Editor	Episode: "Discovered in a Graveyard"
1983	Jackanory	Storyteller	5 episodes
1985	The Caucasian Chalk Circle	Simon	Television film
1988	King and Castle	Tony Chen	Episode: "Dim Sums"
1989	Murder by Moonlight	Chang	Television film
1989–1991	Making Out	Mr. Kim	3 episodes
1989–1990	Brookside	Michael Choi	17 episodes
1991	Tatort	Chow Hap-man	Episode: "Die chinesische Methode"
1992	Rear Window	Brilliant Chang / Narrator	Episode: "White Girls on Dope"
1993	Every Silver Lining	Leonard	6 episodes
1994	Wild Justice	Wong	Television film
1995	Rich Deceiver	Ricky Ramon	Television film
1996	Thief Takers	Jimmy Mak	2 episodes
1996	Bugs	Chaku	Episode: "...Must Come Down "
2000	Arabian Nights	Assad	Miniseries
2002	Oscar Charlie	Dr Pang	6 episodes
2003	The Bill	Li Chen	Episode: "100: Under the Thumb"
2006	Casualty	Jiang Guang	Episode: "No Way Back"
2008	ChuckleVision	Chives the Butler	Episode: "The Mystery of Little-Under-Standing"
2010	Spirit Warriors	Ding-Xiang	6 episodes
2013	Holby City	Raymond Lo	2 episodes
2014	24: Live Another Day	President Wei	2 episodes
2017–2018	Fortitude	Hong Mankyo	6 episodes (series 2–3)
2018	Lucky Man	Tai Jing	Episode: "The Sins of the Father"
2018	Luo Bao Bei	Grandpa	Voice role; 26 episodes
2019	Porters	Dalai Lama	Episode: "Wedding & Perfume"
2021	Midsomer Murders	Fergus Rooney	Episode: "Scarecrow Murders"
2022	The Capture	Xian Xiaodong	Episode: "Made in China"
2022	Pennyworth	Zeya Khin	2 episodes
2025	Wolf King	Huth, Hamwell	Voice

=== Video games ===
Year	Title	Role	Notes
1999	Silver	Cagen	
2001	Three Kingdoms: Fate of the Dragon		
2003	Warhammer 40,000: Fire Warrior	Ko'vash	
2010	Just Cause 2		
2012	Brink	Additional voices	
2013	Lego City Undercover	Henrik Kowalski	
2017	The Lego Ninjago Movie Video Game	Master Wu	
2018	Ni no Kuni II: Revenant Kingdom	Pugnacius	English version

== Stage ==
Year	Title	Role	Notes
1973	Decameron '73	Storyteller	Roundhouse, London / Manchester Opera House, Manchester
1973	The Man From The East	Boy	Europe tour
1974	Jack and the Beanstalk		Citizens Theatre, Glasgow
1975	Jingo	Soldier	Aldwych Theatre, London
1975	Raindog	Monk / Narrator	Roundhouse, London
1976	Noah	Shem	Chichester Festival Theatre, Chichester
1976	Twelfth Night	Sailor / Attendant	Chichester Festival Theatre, Chichester
1976	Antony and Cleopatra	Alexas	Young Vic, London
1977	Rosencrantz and Guildenstern Are Dead	Tragedian / Ambassador	Young Vic, London
1977	Romeo and Juliet	Benvolio	Young Vic, London
1977	Tobias and the Angel	Tobias	Young Vic, London
1977	Follow the Star	Angel Gabriel	Chichester Festival Theatre, Chichester / Westminster Theatre
1978	Measure for Measure	Lucio	Avon Touring Theatre Company
1983	Sinbad the Sailor	Sinbad	Theatre Royal Stratford East
1983	Buried Treasure	Toby Wong	Tricycle Theatre, London
1983–1984	Peter Pan	Peter Pan	Darlington Civic Theatre, Darlington
1984	The Knack		Tour
1985	The Wizard of Oz	Straw Man	Kings Theatre, Portsmouth
1986	Made in Bangkok	Net	Aldwych Theatre, London
1987	Julius Caesar	Various	Bristol Old Vic, Bristol
1988	Don't Go Away Mad		Donmar Warehouse, London
1988	Ear, Nose and Throat		Tour
1990	Frauds	Johnny Sun	Abbey Theatre, Dublin
1991	The King and I	The King	Manchester Opera House, Manchester
1991	Mother Goose	Mother Goose	Shaw Theatre, London
1992	White Woman Street	Yeshov	Bush Theatre, London / Abbey Theatre, Dublin
1993	Three Japanese Women	Mr Tanaka	Cockpit Theatre, London
1994	The Life of the World to Come	Dr Ken Makoto	Almeida Theatre, London
1994	Aladdin	Aladdin	Theatre Royal, Brighton
1997	Hamlet	Claudius	Singapore Repertory Theatre, Singapore
2006	King Lear	Albany / Gloucester	Royal Shakespeare Company / Yellow Earth Theatre international tour
2008	Turandot	Fi Jeh	Hampstead Theatre, London
2009	The King and I	The Kralahome	Royal Albert Hall, London
2009	Chun Yi: The Legend of Kung Fu	Older Chun Yi	London Coliseum
2010	Gold Mountain	Yee Lui	Co-writer; Unity Theatre, Liverpool
2011	Fit and Proper People	Frankie Wong	Soho Theatre, London
2012	The Bomb: A Partial History	Various	Tricycle Theatre, London
2013–2014	Yellow Face	HYH	Park Theatre and National Theatre, London
2017	The Great Wave	Takishi / Jiro	National Theatre, London
2018	Eastern Star	U Nay Min	Tara Theatre, London

== Audio ==
Year	Title	Role	Notes
2004	The Inventor of Fireworks		BBC Radio 3
2007	Dalek Empire: The Fearless	Kennedy	Big Finish Productions
2007	Doctor Who: The Girl Who Never Was	Curly / Tourist / Inspector Yew	Big Finish Productions
2013	Gallifrey	Hector	Big Finish Productions
