= Derek Martin =

English actor (1933–2026)

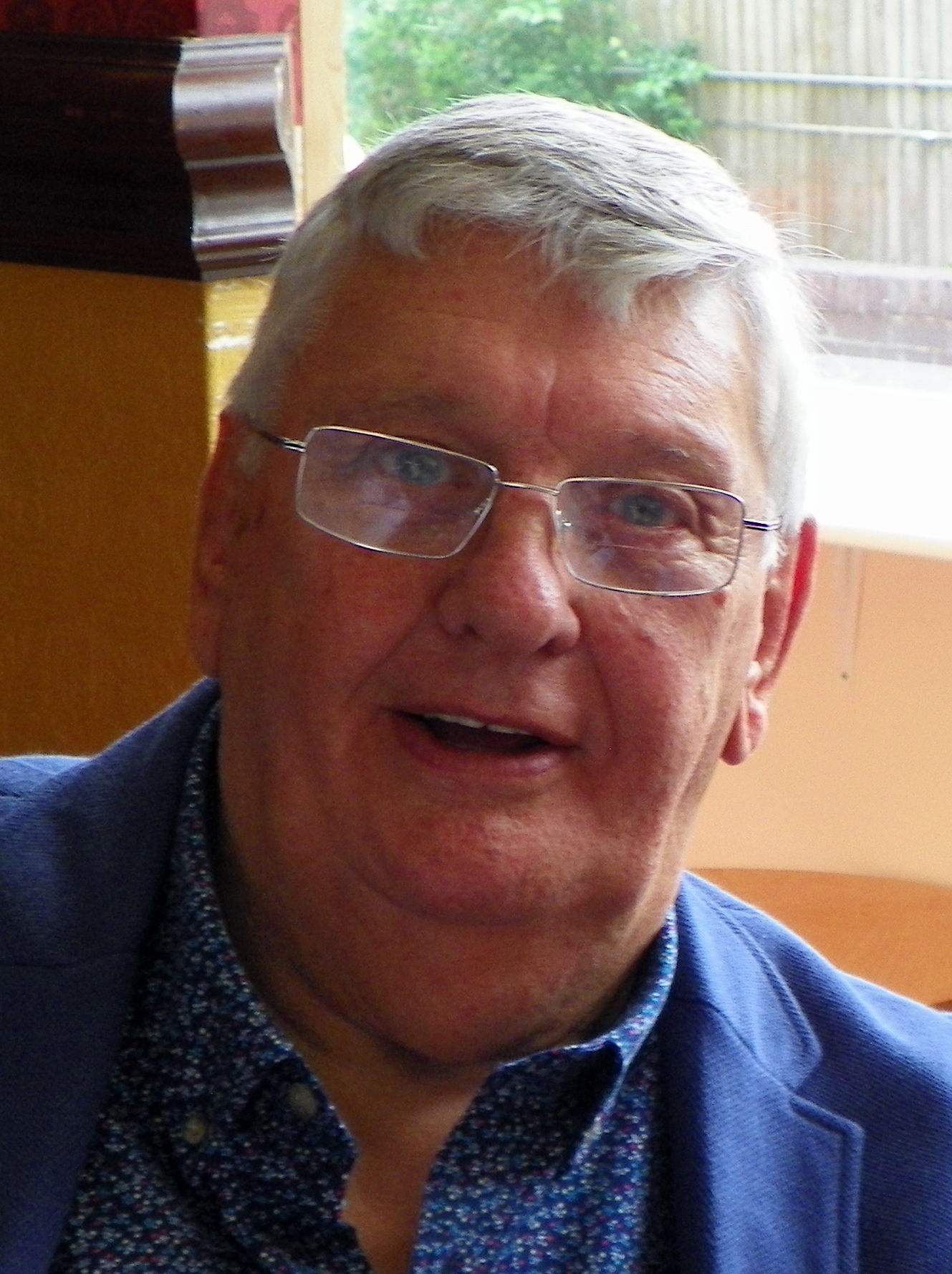
- Martin in 2016
- Born: Derek William Rapp; 11 April 1933; Bow, London, England
- Died: 10 January 2026 (aged 92); Hertfordshire, England
- Occupations: Actor; stuntman
- Years active: 1962–2016
- Television: Law & Order; King and Castle; Eldorado; EastEnders
- Spouse(s): Christine Ann Rigg (m. 1961, divorced) Gloria J. Mitchell (m. 1971, divorced)
- Children: 2
- Website: www.derekmartin.net

Derek William Rapp (11 April 1933 – 10 January 2026), known professionally as Derek Martin, was an English actor. With a career spanning more than five decades, he began as a stuntman before moving into acting, appearing in a range of British television roles, which included starring in the crime dramas Law & Order (1978) and King and Castle (1985–1988), before taking on his most prominent role of Charlie Slater in the BBC soap opera EastEnders (2000–2011), returning briefly in 2013 and 2016.

== Early life ==
Martin was born Derek William Rapp on 11 April 1933 in Bow, London, to Christina (née Jarvis) and William "Bill" Rapp. Before becoming an actor, he worked as a professional gambler, motor racer, meat‑market porter, and debt collector. He also undertook national service in the Royal Air Force.

== Career ==
Martin began his entertainment career as a stuntman on programmes including Doctor Who, but after breaking his collar bone filming the drama Elizabeth R (1971) he switched to acting. He appeared in the BBC television series Paul Temple and the ITV series The Governor. His film credits included Secrets of a Windmill Girl (1966), The Sex Thief (1973), Eskimo Nell (1975), Sex Express (aka Diversions) (1975), Adventures of a Plumber's Mate (1978), Ragtime (1981), Spaghetti House (1982), and Boston Kickout (1995).

In 1978 Martin co-starred with Peter Dean in the BBC television series Law & Order, playing Detective Inspector Fred Pyall. From 1981 to 1982 he played Det. Insp. Berwick in two series of the BBC drama The Chinese Detective. In 1982 he became the second actor to take on the role of R. D. Wingfield's fictional Detective Inspector Jack Frost, starring in a BBC radio adaptation of A Touch of Frost. In 1984 he appeared in an episode of the fifth series of Minder. The following year he was cast as the lead in King and Castle alongside Nigel Planer, which ran for two series until 1988. Devised and co-written by The Sweeney creator Ian Kennedy Martin, the drama featured Martin as former policeman Ronald King, now running a debt‑collection agency in London's East End. He later appeared in Eldorado as gangster Alex Morris. His other television work included guest roles in numerous programmes, among them a return to Doctor Who to play policeman David Mitchell in Image of the Fendahl (1977), The Sweeney episode "Messenger of the Gods" as the villain Spooner, Upstairs, Downstairs, The Bill and Only Fools and Horses. He also played himself in an episode of Little Britain and starred in the short film Piggy Bank (2004).

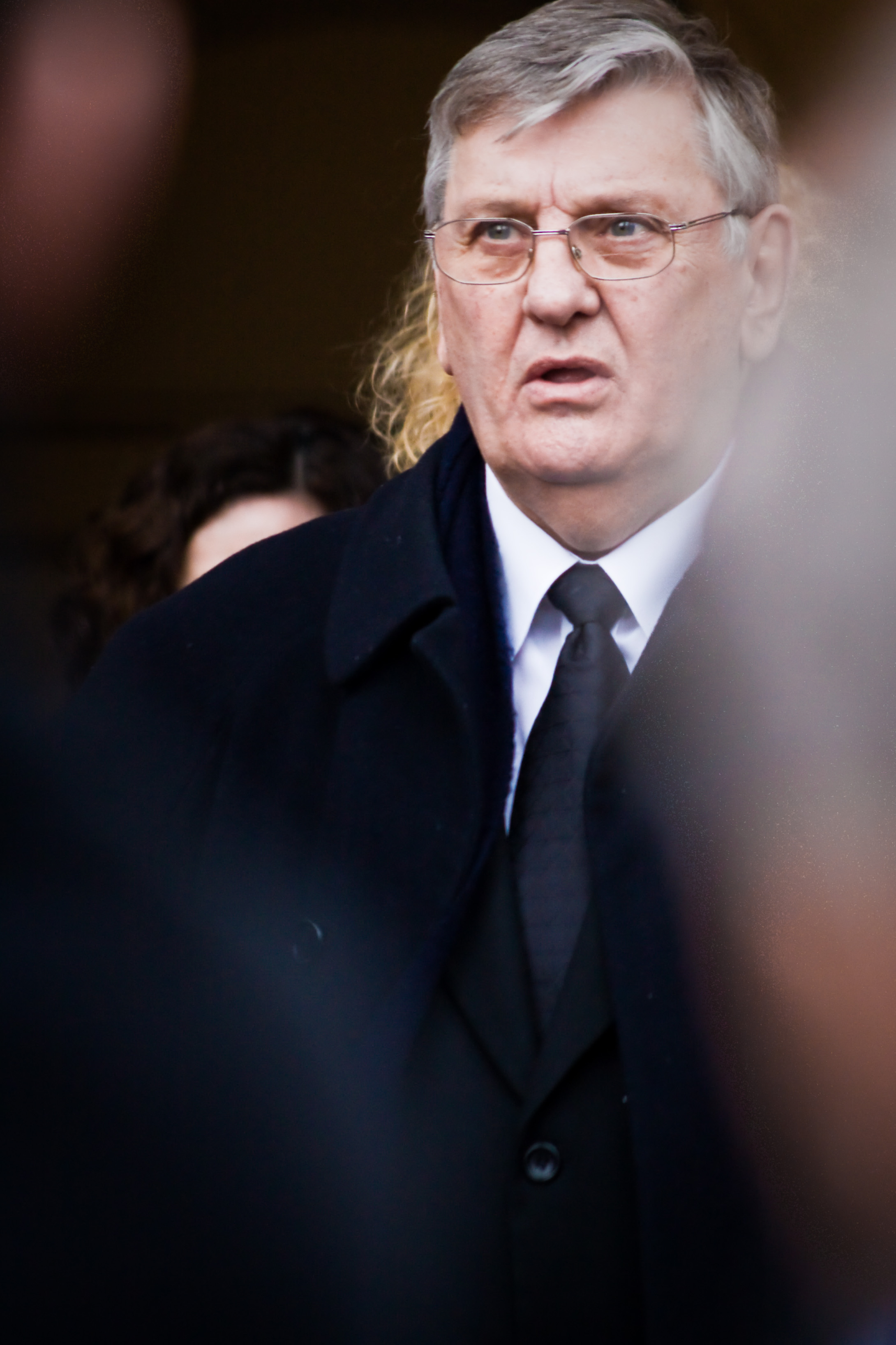
Martin attending the funeral of his EastEnders co-star Wendy Richard in March 2009

Martin began playing Charlie Slater in EastEnders in September 2000. In April 2010 it was announced that he had been cut from the show, along with five other actors. In early 2011 he filmed a guest stint, with Charlie returning for two episodes around April 2011. He returned for another two episodes at Christmas 2013. On 11 February 2015 it was reported that plans for Martin to return had been cancelled, but in October it was announced that he would make a brief appearance over the Christmas and New Year period. He made his final appearance in January 2016, in which his character died after suffering a fatal heart attack.

In January 2012, Martin won the third series of Celebrity Coach Trip, alongside his EastEnders co-star John Altman. From 2010 to 2011 Martin served as King Rat of the Grand Order of Water Rats, an entertainment-industry charity and fraternity.

== Personal life and death ==
Martin was married twice, first to Christine Rigg in 1961 and then to Gloria Mitchell in 1971; both marriages ended in divorce. He had twin sons in 1978, David (died January 2026) and Jonathan with his second wife. In February 2010 it was reported that he was due to undergo knee surgery later that year, a condition he attributed to old age, playing football, and carrying meat during his earlier work at Smithfield Meat Market. In his later years, Martin lived in Hatfield, Hertfordshire.

Martin died on 10 January 2026, aged 92. His death was announced on social media by a family friend. His agent later confirmed the news with a statement from Martin's family, saying that "He wasn't just a dad to us, he was a friend and supported us through our highs and lows" [...] adding, "He never stopped learning, he loved meeting people and was always generous with his time."

EastEnders also paid tribute to Martin on their social media pages, saying they were "deeply saddened to hear of his passing", describing his portrayal of Charlie Slater as instantly cementing him in the hearts of the audience, as the head of one of EastEnders' most iconic families.

== Filmography ==
=== Film ===
Year	Title	Role	Notes
1964	The Evil of Frankenstein	Roustabout	
1965	Hysteria	Waiter	
1966	Secrets of a Windmill Girl	Barman	
1966	Two of a Kind	Casablanca Cast Member	
1968	Subterfuge	Shevik's Henchman	
1968	The Big Switch	1st Heavy	
1973	The Sex Thief	Doorman	
1974	Keep It Up, Jack	Client with Swing	
1975	Eskimo Nell	Floor Manager	
1975	The Girl from Starship Venus	Man in Strip Club	
1975	The Motorway File	Don	Short film
1976	Diversions	Escort	
1977	Candleshoe	Policeman	
1978	Adventures of a Plumber's Mate	Motorcycle Dealer	
1980	Dark Water	Security Guard	Short film
1980	The Fiendish Plot of Dr. Fu Manchu	Museum Guard	
1981	Ragtime	Waldo's Aide No. 2	
1981	Priest of Love	Police Sergeant	
1982	Spaghetti House	Commissioner Hutchinson	
1983	The Aerodrome	Provo Sgt. Peters	Television film
1984	The Hope and the Glory	Club Manager	Television film
1992	The Cutter	Benny	Short film
1995	Boston Kickout	Ray	
1999	Piggy Bank	Harry	Short film
1999	Prince of Denmark Hill	Bernard	Short film
2003	EastEnders: Slaters in Detention	Charlie Slater	Spin-off
2004	EastEnders: Pat and Mo	Charlie Slater	Television film

=== Television ===
Year	Title	Role	Notes
1963	Maigret	Extra	Uncredited; 1 episode
1963	BBC Sunday-Night Play	Porter	1 episode
1963	Moonstrike	—N/a	1 episode
1964	It's a Square World	Various Characters	11 episodes
1964	Lance at Large	—N/a	1 episode
1964	Rupert of Hentzau	Hireling	1 episode
1965	No Hiding Place	Scouse	1 episode
1965	Londoners	Barry	1 episode
1965–1977	Doctor Who	UNIT Soldier / Prisoner / David Mitchell / Thug / Soldier / Ship's Crew / Extra / Parisian in Rue des Fosses St. Germain / Soldier Killed by Auton	15 episodes
1965	Out of the Unknown	Reporter / Guard	2 episodes
1966	A Game of Murder	Taxi Driver	1 episode
1966	Comedy Playhouse	—N/a	1 episode
1966	Thirteen Against Fate	Gendarme	1 episode
1966	Blackmail	N.C.O.	1 episode
1966–1967	Adam Adamant Lives!	Coach Driver / Villain / TA Soldier	3 episodes
1966–1969	Softly Softly	Taxi Driver / Det. Con. Jones / Det. Con. Milne	3 episodes
1967	Theatre 625	—N/a	1 episode
1967	Mickey Dunne	Cruncher	1 episode
1967	The Big M	Motorist	1 episode
1967–1969	Z-Cars	Carter / Demolition Worker / PC Oldshaw	3 episodes
1969	The Borderers	Andrew / Outlaw / Ritchie's Assistant	4 episodes
1969	The First Churchills	Sergeant	1 episode
1970	Jackanory	The Stranger / The man	10 episodes
1970–1971	Paul Temple	Paddy	6 episodes
1971	Elizabeth R	Horseman to Cecil	1 episode
1971	Mogul	Driver	1 episode
1971–1974	Softly, Softly: Task Force	Ted / Dick	2 episodes
1972	The Regiment	Private Jones	1 episode
1972	The Brothers	Van Driver	1 episode
1972	New Scotland Yard	Bill	1 episode
1972	Mandog	Gala One / Gala	4 episodes
1972–1973	Spy Trap	Brown / Davis	6 episodes
1972–1975	Dixon of Dock Green	Fingers Tozer / Len Drake	2 episodes
1973	The Roses of Eyam	William Thornley	TV play
1973	Fish	Van driver	1 episode
1973	Six Days of Justice	Warrant Officer	1 episode
1973–1974	The Adventures of Black Beauty	Thug Two / Beadle	2 episodes
1974	The Zoo Gang	Gallery Guard	Uncredited; 1 episode
1975	Upstairs, Downstairs	Heckler	1 episode
1975	Doctor on the Go	Prison Officer Sykes	1 episode
1975	You're on Your Own	Potter	1 episode
1976	The Melting Pot	—N/a	3 episodes
1976–1977	The Duchess of Duke Street	Sergeant / Ben Smythe	2 episodes
1976–1980	Play for Today	Jimmy / Security Guard	2 episodes
1977	Just William	Man with lantern	1 episode
1977	Maidens' Trip	Sam Stevens	1 episode
1977	Survivors	Cyril	1 episode
1977	Holding On	Sergeant	1 episode
1977–1978	Target	Alan Ziegler / Taxi Driver	2 episodes
1978	The Sweeney	Spooner	1 episode
1978	Law & Order	D.I. Fred Pyall	Series regular; 3 episodes
1978	The Professionals	Renshaw	1 episode
1978	BBC2 Play of the Week	Frank	1 episode
1978	It Ain't Half Hot Mum	Military Policeman	1 episode
1979	Potter	Boilerman	1 episode
1979	Maggie and Her	Barman	1 episode
1979	ITV Playhouse	Colley	1 episode
1979–1982	BBC2 Playhouse	Reg / The Corp	2 episodes
1979–1983	Angels	Mr. Smith / Alec Banks / Len Smith	6 episodes
1979–1983	Terry and June	Mr. Parkins / Policeman	2 episodes
1979–1984	Minder	Fenton's Heavy / Cedric	2 episodes
1980	The Enigma Files	Brewer	1 episode
1980	The Gentle Touch	Nellie Jackson	1 episode
1980	Premiere	Drill sergeant	1 episode
1980	Shoestring	Parry	1 episode
1980–1983	Pig in the Middle	Roger Boocock	3 episodes
1981	Agony	Police Inspector	1 episode
1981	Private Schulz	Gruber	1 episode
1981	World's End	Daley	2 episodes
1981–1982	The Chinese Detective	Detective Chief Inspector Berwick	Series regular; 14 episodes
1983	Hart to Hart	Inspector Drootin	1 episode
1983	Give us a Break	Thompson's Backer	1 episode
1984	Big Deal	Phil Graves	1 episode
1984	Murder Not Proven?	James Hanks Loching	1 episode
1985	The Pickwick Papers	Hunt	1 episode
1985	The Bright Side	Mr. Royal	5 episodes
1985	Storyboard	Det. Sgt. Ronald King	1 episode
1985	Dempsey and Makepeace	Scott	1 episode
1985–1988	King and Castle	Ronald King	Series regular
1990	Screen One	D.I. Russell	1 episode
1991	Fiddlers Three	Detective Sergeant Stubbs	1 episode
1992	True Crimes	Detective	1 episode
1992–1997	The Bill	Kenny Stone / Dave Richards / George Talbot	3 episodes
1993	Eldorado	Alex Morris	Series regular; 40 episodes
1993	Only Fools and Horses	Arthur	1 episode
1995–1996	The Governor	Gary Marshall	Series regular; 12 episodes
1996	Ellington	Dennis Pollock	1 episode
1997	The Detectives	Groom's Father	1 episode
2000–2011, 2013, 2016	EastEnders	Charlie Slater	Regular role
2001	Comic Relief: Say Pants to Poverty	Charlie Slater	TV special
2005	Little Britain	Himself	1 episode
2012	Celebrity Coach Trip	Himself	Winner; Series 3
