= Break (2020 film) =

British film

- Directed by: Michael Elkin
- Written by: Michael Elkin
- Produced by: Michael Elkin; Terri Dwyer; Dean Fisher
- Starring: Sam Gittins; Rutger Hauer; Jamie Foreman; David Yip; Adam Deacon
- Cinematography: Richard Swingle
- Edited by: Les Healey
- Music by: Ian Arber
- Production companies: Break Films; Scanner-Rhodes Productions
- Distributed by: Cesca Films
- Release date: 22 July 2020
- Running time: 107 minutes
- Country: United Kingdom
- Language: English

Break is a 2020 British independent film. Written and directed by Michael Elkin, it stars Sam Gittins, Jamie Foreman, Adam Deacon, Terri Dwyer, David Yip and Rutger Hauer in one of his final screen roles. Snooker player cameos include Liang Wenbo, Jack Lisowski and 1997 World Snooker Championship winner Ken Doherty.

== Plot ==
A young snooker player is helped by a local gangster and a veteran Chinese pool champion to break free from a world of crime and reach the glittering lights of Beijing to play in a prestigious Chinese snooker tournament that could save his life. It has been described as "Rocky with a snooker cue".

== Cast ==
- Sam Gittins as Spencer
- Rutger Hauer as Ray
- Jamie Foreman as Monty
- Terri Dwyer as Cathy Pryde
- Luke Mably as Terry Pryde
- Sophie Stevens as Shelley
- David Yip as Qiang
- Adam Deacon as "Weasel"
- Mark Homer as Prison Officer Yates
- Charlie Wernham as Wallis
- Jack Lisowski as himself
- Ken Doherty as himself
- Liang Wenbo as himself

== Production ==
Filmed at locations including the Crucible Theatre in Sheffield, Beijing and Canterbury Prison in Kent.

== Release ==
Although originally intended to be released in April 2020, it became the first UK movie to premiere via Drive-in when, during the COVID-19 pandemic, it was released to coincide with the delayed 2020 World Snooker Championship. The premiere was held on 22 July 2020 at Brent Cross Drive-In Club in North London, the first premiere of its kind.

== Reception ==
The feature-length film debut by Elkin was described as "impressive" by Reviews Hub in which he "throws all the sports film clichés up in the air and rearranges them into a heart-warming story of working class aspiration, decency and the belief that whatever the social and economic circumstances talent can be realised". Also "the depth in Elkin's characters adds considerably to the viewer’s empathy for and belief in Spencer as the story unfolds". Sam Gittins' performance as Spencer was also praised: "a role that could easily have become a two-dimensional troubled youth refusing adult help and sulking. Instead Gittins gives a rounded characterisation".
