= Holly & Stephen's Saturday Showdown =

British children's programme

- Genre: Children's entertainment
- Presented by: Holly Willoughby; Stephen Mulhern
- Starring: Peter Cocks; Raymond Griffiths; Vincent Wong; Don Austen; John Eccleston; Karl Sedgwick; Robert Duncombe; Mark Dandridge; Laura Tilli; Jessica Tilli; Sean Douglas; Paul Litchfield; Colin Ash
- Opening theme: "Ministry of Mayhem" by The Noise Next Door
- Composers: Craig Sutton; Scott Sutton; Ed Sutton

Production
- Running time: 125 minutes (January 2004 – December 2005); 155 minutes (January–July 2006); 30 minutes (2006: Showdown Extra)
- Production companies: The Foundation; Carlton Television (2004); ITV Productions (Note: Known as Granada Productions until 2 February 2006) (2004-2006)

Original release
- Network: ITV (2004–06); CITV (2006)
- Release: 10 January 2004 – 1 July 2006

Holly & Stephen's Saturday Showdown (originally titled Ministry of Mayhem) is a British children's entertainment programme that was broadcast on ITV (later CITV) from 10 January 2004 to 1 July 2006.

== Overview ==
Ministry of Mayhem was first broadcast on 10 January 2004 and aired weekly on a Saturday morning on ITV. The programme featured a mix of cartoons, celebrity guests, live music and phone-in competitions – with surreal characters, crazy games and a load of gunge thrown in for good measure. It was initially presented by CITV presenters Stephen Mulhern, Holly Willoughby and Michael Underwood.

The theme tune was sung by boyband The Noise Next Door and can be found as a B-side to their debut single "Lock Up Ya Daughters".

The show was produced at The Maidstone Studios by The Foundation, working initially in partnership with Carlton Television. After Carlton and Granada merged in 2004 to form ITV plc, all Carlton productions were switched to run under the Granada name, thus the programme became a Granada-Foundation production. From 2006, Granada programmes for ITV were branded ITV Productions, and so it became an ITV Productions-The Foundation production for the remainder of its run. It was one of the last Saturday morning children's live magazine programmes on British television and the final show on 1 July 2006 marked the end of Saturday morning children's programmes on ITV after 32 years.

== Significant changes ==
=== The first revamp ===
This occurred on 24 July 2004, with a new set and opening titles being introduced; however, the characters 'Tina and Gina' were not included in the revamp. Other new additions included sketch series At Home with the Mayhems and later Butthaven, which featured the presenters playing 'rainbow coats' in a fictitious holiday camp of the same name – with possible inspiration from the sitcom Hi-de-Hi!, and even a special studio appearance from one of the show's stars, Ruth Madoc, who was subsequently gunged.

=== Further changes ===
On 18 December 2004, Underwood presented his final edition, though this was not announced on screen until towards the end of the show; he was given a Ministry style send off.

From 1 January 2005, Ministry of Mayhem was rebranded and shortened to as MoM, which was first listed in magazines and EPGs. However, the Ministry name was still retained in the opening titles and theme tune.

=== Animals & Additions ===
On 26 February 2005, a large crate mysteriously arrived in the studio, and viewers were asked to guess what was inside. When eventually opened, it revealed the show's new resident puppet characters, 'The Hyenas' – operated by Don Austen and John Eccleston. Austen and Eccleston were no strangers to Saturday morning children's television with previous experience on What's Up Doc and Live and Kicking. Every week, The Hyenas would provide humour and wreak havoc amongst the proceedings. Viewers were later asked to suggest names for them, the eventual winner being Scratch and Sniff.

The game Name That Tone saw the introduction of a man by the name of Mr. Lee (played by Vincent Wong), whose original intention was to solely deliver the list of ring tones to whoever was hosting the game to the song of his same name by The Bobbettes – and the autumn saw the arrival of a puppy called Snowy, who like The Hyenas had his name chosen from viewers' suggestions.

=== Holly & Stephen's Saturday Showdown ===
On 7 January 2006 after a Christmas break, the programme returned with a new format, design, theme tune, and name – Holly & Stephen's Saturday Showdown.

The format consisted of Willoughby and Mulhern inviting viewers and celebrities into their 'flat' to participate in a battle of the sexes. The teams had to earn points from the games they played, and which ever team had the most points by the end of the show would be the winner, with the losing team having to face a forfeit (e.g. getting covered in gunge). Also ten viewers (of the winning gender) at home would win a key to the flat and/or a place on the team for the studio games the following week.

Ray and Scratch 'n' Sniff remained after the revamp. The most noticeable character absences were The Doctor and Mr. Lee. A new character called Wallace was introduced. He was a rapping child who supposedly lived in the closet under the stairs; he disappeared after the first episode.

On 11 March 2006 it was the first programme to be broadcast on the long-awaited CITV Channel, which also saw the introduction of Saturday Showdown Extra, which was exclusive to the new channel and aired straight after the main programme from 11:30 to 12:00. Only viewers on the CITV Channel were able to watch the entire 11 March 2006 edition as, over on ITV1, coverage of the qualifying session for the Bahrain Grand Prix was being broadcast from 10:30.

=== Cancellation ===
It was first reported on 12 May 2006 that Saturday Showdown was to be axed, which was owing to ITV's in-house children's production arm closing down. The programme was gradually phased out, eventually being dropped from the ITV network itself as of 10 June and its last three weeks airing exclusively on the CITV Channel. As such, the programme no longer used the 'Extra' tagline, given that the whole two-and-a-half hour show was now only airing on the CITV Channel.

On 1 July 2006, the very final edition was broadcast, which saw the return of the characters 'The Doctor', 'Mr. Lee' and one half of The Hyenas, 'Sniff'. There was also a new take on MoM favourite Cakey Sk8, plus some jabs by presenters and characters towards the decision taken by ITV to air a new cookery programme by the name of Saturday Cooks! in its place on the main channel.

At the very end of the final show, Holly and Stephen were both gunged by the cast and the crew, after which an "older" Holly and Stephen reminisced about their time together in a pre-recorded post-credits style scene.

== The Lab ==
The Lab was with the show from the start and survived the many revamps, though the set itself changed. It was primarily used by the Doc, a mock German scientist and 1970s throwback from the University of Brighton, played by Peter Cocks. Although in later shows he was never referred to by name, in an early edition of the show, he revealed his surname to be Undgoggles, presumably making his first name Helmut. The Doc was usually accompanied by Stephen (as a lab-hand) for this part of the show, and the two attempted a simple experiment in order to demonstrate some scientific principle; the Doc also tried to incapacitate Stephen with laughter (and succeeded on several occasions) by laying on thick innuendo, as well as comedic hints towards homosexuality and Nazism, much to the hilarity of adult viewers. At least one of the experiments resulted in a complaint to OFCOM being upheld for fear that it would encourage children to imitate a dangerous procedure.

The original Lab was a plain white room located somewhere in the large studio. Post revamp it occupied a fairly large part of the studio in an enclosed set. However, to make room for a new seated area within the enclosed set, and larger outdoor-oriented experiments, the Lab was reduced to at least half its original size and equipped with a cupboard that acted as a portal to the outdoors for larger experiments.

When the programme was renamed Saturday Showdown, the show no longer had the Doc or his lab. Though on 18 March 2006, the Doc made a surprise appearance at the end of the main show. The part went as follows: Just as Holly and Stephen are about to say goodbye, Stephen found a German towel. They both say, "He isn't back, is he?" and we see through the door's frosted glass the blur of The Doctor as he shouts through the letterbox. But viewers without cable or satellite never got to see him that week, as he only fully appeared on the CITV Channel's Holly and Stephen's Saturday Showdown Extra. Though Stephen asked the Doc on the show if he could come back next week, it was to be a one-off appearance. However, the Doc re-appeared for the final show on 1 July 2006.

== Shows ==
MoM was also host to many children's shows and cartoons, including SpongeBob SquarePants and Finders Keepers. After the launch of the CITV channel, viewers could switch over for a different show (similar to the interactive feature on CBBC's Mighty Truck of Stuff).

- All Grown Up! (2004)
- The Angry Beavers (2004)
- Creature Comforts (2004)
- ¡Mucha Lucha! (2004)
- My Parents Are Aliens (2004)
- Sabrina The Teenage Witch (2004)
- Teen Angel (2004)
- Tutenstein (2004)
- Pet Alien (2004–05)
- Atomic Betty (2004–06)
- Drake & Josh (2004–06)
- SpongeBob SquarePants (2004–06)
- New Captain Scarlet (2005)
- King Arthur's Disasters (2005)
- Planet Sketch (2005)
- The Amazing Adrenalini Brothers (2006)
- Shuriken School (2006)
- Teenage Mutant Ninja Turtles (2006)
- Bratz (2006, CITV channel only)
- Grizzly Tales for Gruesome Kids (2006, CITV channel only)

== Ministry Games ==
=== Cakey Sk8 ===
Celebrities propel cakes from skateboards and the cake which reaches highest up the wall wins; the wall had to be extended after it was found that celebrities using it were getting the cakes higher and higher. The cakes were brought on by Willoughby, in the role of "Cousin Polly with the Trolley", wearing a French maid costume and short black wig. She would speak in an exaggerated cockney accent, and give the scores in metres, which she would pronounce "MEE-ahs".

=== Spelling Smackdown ===
This game saw Stephen (in one episode, Holly) dressed up in a bumblebee costume and colloquially known as the "Spellminator" ("Spellminatrix" for Holly) and another contestant who usually wrote in to the Ministry to take part. Michael was dressed in a black dinner suit and was the MC. There were three rounds of spelling, in which each contestant was given a word with its definition and had to spell it one letter at a time. The person with the most points at the end would win and later receive the Spelling Smackdown belt. If there was a tie after three rounds then a spell-off contest would take place. The spell-off would involve a longer word (usually nine letters or more) being given and each competitor would take it in turns to spell the word letter by letter; the first person to make a mistake would lose. The game disappeared after a few weeks and then returned briefly with different rules, using the spell-off format. Before the contest, both the Spellminator and the contestant would walk into the ring accompanied by a song with a spelling motif such as: "Respect" by Aretha Franklin, "D.I.S.C.O." by Ottawan, "I.O.U" by Freeez, "Y.M.C.A." by Village People and "ABC" by Jackson 5.

=== Name that Tone ===
Mr. Lee (played by Vincent Wong) brings on the ring-tones to his own theme tune. Then, contestants from the studio audience pair up with either one of the presenters or the show's celebrity guest to guess the titles of songs in the form of ring-tones, usually for a mobile phone or an MP3. A spin-off show entitled "MoM's Name that Tone" featured on CITV on Tuesdays for a while.

=== Ram Ray ===
Ram Ray was the most popular game in the show. It involved the dwarf stuntman Ray (played by actor Raymond Griffiths) charging into a set of five doors, four wooden, one made of paper. A caller would select a door, hoping for it to be made of paper. Ray would then charge at a door and either run through it if it was made of paper or slam into it and fall backwards if it was made of wood. Ray would often fall and roll across the floor of the studio rather dramatically, and he was often checked to see if he was hurt (although Stephen often found his collisions hilarious). To suit the theme of an episode, Ray would often wear a matching costume.

=== Race Ray ===
A contestant would attempt to beat Ray in a one-on-one race, normally on foot, but occasionally by other modes of transport, such as husky dogs. The contestant would often be given a handicap (e.g. time, distance) and was required to make up the deficit to Ray over the course of the race.

=== Relly from Helly ===
An audience member is embarrassed by a relative, which also became a feature of the very first Showdown as the Parent Trap where the viewer embarrassed the parent.

=== Supermarket Sneak ===
Two teams, composed of one of the presenters and a child, go to a supermarket with a trolley full of items in progressively larger sizes. The aim of the game is to place all of the items into unsuspecting shoppers' trolleys. The first team to do so wins.

The introduction of this game came a matter of weeks before the new series of Dick and Dom in da Bungalow started which was to feature an almost identical game, which had been pre-filmed in August.

=== Jibber Jabber ===
A game the hyenas created, an audience member is made to sit on a chair in front of a giant mouth sculpture and must talk about a subject without saying a specific word. If the audience member says the word then they are disqualified and sent head first through the mouth hole. If they manage to talk for the required amount of time without saying the word then they'll be told their prize is backstage and are then sent into the mouth regardless. The Hyenas are implied to eat the contestants regardless of if they win or lose. After the game's first appearance the hyenas would also splash the loser with "Hyena milk" (implied to be their urine). Later the rules were changed so that the contestant had to guess three specific words instead with the punchline of the game still being the same.

== Saturday Showdown Games ==
Showdown had many games to fill the time gaps between shows. The games included:

=== Dodge Dolly's Balls ===
Despite the rude-sounding name, it is actually Granny Dolly in her loft with Scratch and Sniff. They both have to dodge her mothballs and the one with the least hits wins. The golden ball also wipes out all of your hits. Despite having the appearance of a live phone-in game, this segment is actually pre-recorded. This has been proved by the fact that Sniff only appears in this segment. The game has appeared on editions where Holly Willoughby was absent, along with the lack of any obvious entry details for the game, either on the show or the website, and with the speed Holly would have to change costumes if the segment was live, as she appears on screen within seconds either side of the game. It has been speculated that the callers on this segment are either somehow connected to the crew or the winners of keys to the studio, and are present in the studio at the time of recording. According to Sniff, Granny Dolly is now dead, as he had to eat her, as he had no food, which is why DDB finished.

=== Parent Trap ===
A version of Relly from Helly in which the child embarrasses the parent, which was discontinued after one show.

=== Pumping on your Stereo ===
A similar format to Name that Tone, based around distorted songs rather than ring-tones, and featuring Scratch rather than Mr. Lee but on the final show, Mr. Lee returned.

=== Ram Ray ===
In Saturday Showdown, a revised version of Ram Ray is played. This version uses only four "doors" – a dresser, a cupboard (later a jukebox), a toilet door and a set of shelves. Two callers take it in turns to guess which of these objects is 'soft' i.e. will break when Ray runs into it. The caller who guesses correctly wins points for their team, be it boys or girls. This segment primarily used furniture but as weeks went by, they slowly reverted to 3 doors and a dresser.

=== Supermarket Sneak ===
Taken from MoM. Cut after 6th show.

=== Celebrity Window Cleaners ===
Both teams would compete against each other as a celebrity's face would be revealed from behind soap bubbles on the studio TV screen. If one team correctly identified the celebrity, they would earn their team points and would then be asked a supplementary question about the celebrity who had just been revealed. Getting that question right would earn the team more points. At the end of the round, there would then be a series of quickfire general knowledge questions, which, as the game was usually played at the end of the show, often determined the winners of that week's showdown.

=== Scratch's Cupboard ===
In this feature, viewers guess what would be in the hyena's dark green cupboard; Holly & Stephen would give out some clues to what would be inside before the viewers started to phone in to guess their answers; more clues would be described the following week if an incorrect answer was given the previous week. If the caller gives out the correct answer, they would win prizes; more prizes were added to the previous weeks' prize if an incorrect answer occurred in consecutive weeks. Example: "It's round, red, hard, something you play with, sits on a table = a snooker ball".

=== Gunge N'Groove ===
As part of Saturday Showdown Extra, Stephen or Holly would stand in a gunge tank, wearing ear defenders with giant ears on both sides, guessing charades to popular songs using props. Example: Holly would wear a blonde Heidi Range wig with a red apron = "Red Dress" by Sugababes. If they answered correctly, there was no gunging but if they did answer incorrectly, the presenter would be gunged.

=== Other Games ===
Since Ministry of Mayhem started many games have been played, to date many have been discontinued including:

- Snap: This is the most recent edition where hyenas Scratch and Sniff put their paws into mousetraps attached to a Wheel of Fortune-style wheel. The caller that selects the trap that Doesn't go off wins a prize.

== Specials ==
Christmas editions of MoM were aired on 25 December 2004 and 24 December 2005.

The most notable special edition was on 17 September 2005, in honour of ITV's 50th anniversary, where the programme celebrated the history of Saturday morning children's television on the network. The special guests were a selection of presenters from the programme's many predecessors, sharing their memories and participating in the usual MoM items.

The guests were Sally James, Neil Buchanan, Gareth Jones, Gaby Roslin, Pat Sharp, Jenny Powell, Gail Porter and Brian Dowling - with a special appearance from Timmy Mallett. There were also interviews with Chris Tarrant and Ant & Dec, and The Phantom Flan Flinger, mascot of Tiswas, was revived.

== Sponsorships ==
When the show launched in 2004, former SMTV Live sponsors Monster Munch was the main sponsor. Cheesestrings took over the following year and remained the official sponsor until the show's end on 1 July 2006.
