= The Noise Next Door =

English band

- Origin: United Kingdom
- Genre: Pop punk
- Years active: 2004–2005
- Labels: Us and Them Records
- Past members: Craig Sutton; Scott Sutton; Ed Sutton

The Noise Next Door were a three-piece band, made up of triplet brothers from Leigh Park, England. Craig, Scott, and Ed Sutton were born on 30 May 1986, to Annette and Barry Sutton. They were the final three of an already large family consisting of four girls. Their father, Barry, was a musician and the three boys started a band at the age of thirteen called 'Trips'.

In 2004, John McLaughlin, who has written for Busted, Blue, and Sugababes, discovered them working in their local Asda. On 25 October 2004, they released their first single "Lock Up Your Daughters" (the b-side of which was "Ministry of Mayhem", the theme music to the CITV television show of the same name) which reached number 12 on the UK Singles Chart. Their next single, "Calendar Girl", reached 11.

The Noise Next Door were famous for their red hair. However, during May 2005, the band opted for a more mature image and cut off their red hair. They then released two more singles, "She Might", which made number 27 in the chart, and "Miss U", which reached 95.

The Noise Next Door recorded an album, Play It Loud, however they were dropped by their record label.

Their official website was also shut down.

The triplets also appeared in an ITV documentary entitled Identical Triplets: Their Secret World, which broadcast on 23 June 2008.

== Members ==
- Ed Sutton – vocals, guitars
- Craig Sutton – vocals, bass
- Scott Sutton – drums

== Discography ==
=== Singles ===
Year	Single	Peak chart positions
Year	Single	UK
2004	"Lock Up Ya Daughters"/"Ministry Of Mayhem"	12
2005	"Calendar Girl"	11
2005	"She Might"	27
2005	"Miss U"	95
