= Ping Pong (1986 film) =

1986 film by Po-Chih Leong

- Theatrical release poster
- Directed by: Po-Chih Leong
- Screenplay by: Jerry Liu
- Produced by: Malcolm Craddock; Michael Guest
- Starring: David Yip; Lucy Sheen; Robert Lee; Lam Fung; Victor Kan
- Cinematography: Nicholas D. Knowland
- Edited by: David Spiers
- Music by: Richard Harvey
- Distributed by: Film Four International
- Release date: 1986
- Running time: 95 minutes
- Country: United Kingdom
- Languages: English; Cantonese
- Budget: £650,000
- Box office: £12,928 (UK) $67,421 (US)

Ping Pong is a 1986 British comedy mystery film directed by Po-Chih Leong. It stars David Yip, Lucy Sheen, and Robert Lee. The film was produced by Picture Palace Films for Film Four International. Sheen in her debut role plays Elaine Choi, a law clerk brought in to carry out the will of a prominent restaurateur. It premiered at the Venice Film Festival.

== Plot ==
In Chinatown, London, restaurateur Sam Wong dies in a telephone booth after making a call. Law clerk Elaine Choi is tasked with executing his will. After attending Mr. Wong's funeral, she reads the will to the family. Mr. Wong leaves one of his restaurants to his eldest son Mike on the condition that it be run as a traditional Chinese restaurant, and another to Jimmy Lee if he agrees to run the restaurant. To his wife Ah Ying, he leaves the family home and warehouse. He leaves £90,000 to be shared equally between his two sons and his daughter Cherry. The latter also receives the family store. For his friend Mr. Chen, he gives the family farm on the condition that he visits it weekly. The last recipient named Sarah Lee is unknown to the family and receives his vintage sports car if she learns to drive. The final condition of the will is that Mr. Wong is to be buried in his home village in China, but the Chinese embassy rules require that his body be accompanied by a family member, which initially all the family members refuse to do.

In order for the will to be valid, it needs to be signed by its recipients; Choi finds they are reluctant to do so for a variety of reasons. Mike, who runs a successful Italian restaurant, lives a very Anglicised life and wants to build a multiplex complex over his father's restaurant. Cherry and her husband are disappointed that they did not receive the family warehouse which they ran. Mr. Chen is an illegal immigrant who arrived with Mr. Wong in 1936; while Mr. Wong later gained citizenship, Mr. Chen has kept away from the authorities and has not left Chinatown for the last two decades. In her pursuit of getting the will signed by all parties, Choi acts as a go-between for the different family members.

Ah Ying eventually signs the will and agrees to accompany her husband's body back to China. This act prompts Cherry to sign the will. While trying to persuade Mike to sign, Choi falls in love with him. On the day that Mr. Wong's body is due to be sent to China, Mike finds his mother and agrees to accompany her. While waiting for Mike's return, Choi discovers that Sarah Lee is Mr. Wong's secret British mistress. Choi and Mike reunite at the family farm now owned by Mr. Chen who has left Chinatown. Mike gives Choi a gift from China of a traditional dress. Choi also discovers that the last phone call Mr. Wong made was to his brother in China informing him that his wife and his son Mike would soon be visiting the village.

== Cast ==
- David Yip as Mike Wong: Sam's eldest son who runs his own restaurant and is an Anglophile.
- Lucy Sheen as Elaine Choi: A young law clerk tasked with executing Sam Wong's will. She is of Chinese descent but has grown up in England.
- Robert Lee as Mr. Chen: An old friend of Sam Wong who he illegally immigrated with to England in 1936.
- Lam Fung as Ah Ying: Sam Wong's widow.
- Victor Kan as Siu Loong: Cherry Wong's husband.
- Barbara Yu Ling as Cherry Wong: Sam Wong's daughter.
- Ric Young as Alan Wong: Sam Wong's son who is married to an Englishwoman.
- Victoria Wicks as Maggie Wong: Alan Wong's wife.
- K. C. Leong as Sam Wong: A prominent restaurateur whose will is executed by Elaine Choi.
- David Lyon as Peter
- Jonathan Elsom as Probate Official
- Juliet Hammond-Hill as Sarah Lee: Sam Wong's secret English mistress.
- Trevor Baxter as Priest in Church
- Bruce Boa as American tourist
- Vincent Wong as Chinese Gambler
- Philip Voon as Embassy Official

== Production ==
Ping Pong was the first film to be filmed in London's Chinatown. It was also the first film directed in the United Kingdom by Leong who previously shot films in Hong Kong. The idea for the film was created by Leong during the filming of his 1984 comedy Banana Cop. The name of the film is derived from Elaine Choi's role in the film as a go-between in executing the will which she compares to a ping-pong ball. Lucy Sheen made her acting debut in this film.

== Release and reception ==
Ping Pong premiered at the Venice Film Festival in 1986. The film was released in the United States and Canada on 17 July 1987, where it made $67,421 at the box-office. Its gross at the UK box-office was £12,928. Kevin Thomas of the Los Angeles Times wrote that Sheen's performance was its "strongest asset". He described the film as a "quest for identity" for Anglo-Chinese torn between integrating with British culture and the fight in trying not to lose their cultural heritage. Walter Goodman of The New York Times commented that although the film showed some promise, it was mostly "not funny or touching or much of anything." Time Out praised the film's "engaging characters", "lively pace" and "quirky humour".

Ping Pong was theatrically re-released across the UK and Ireland in February 2024 by Park Circus. For the occasion, a brand new DCP of the film was created by Film4, representing the first time the film was available digitally and its first theatrical release since 1986.
