= Vincent Wong (British actor) =

British-Chinese actor (1928–2015)

- Born: Vivian Warren Chen; 4 February 1928; Colony of Jamaica
- Died: 13 March 2015 (aged 87); Camberwell, London, England
- Occupations: Actor, producer
- Years active: 1958–2006

Vivian Warren Chen (4 February 1928 – 13 March 2015), known by the stage name Vincent Wong, was a Jamaican-British actor. He had a long career (over 50 years) playing character roles in television and films, and notably appeared in four James Bond films and in two Batman films.

== Filmography ==
=== Films ===
Year	Title	Role	Notes
1958	The Camp on Blood Island	Japanese driver	Uncredited
1958	The Inn of the Sixth Happiness	Chinese captain	Uncredited
1959	Yesterday's Enemy	Japanese soldier	Uncredited
1959	The Stranglers of Bombay	Thuggee Cult Member	Uncredited
1961	The Terror of the Tongs	Chinese guy	Uncredited
1964	Goldfinger	Goldfinger's Henchman	Uncredited
1966	The Brides of Fu Manchu	Dacoit	Uncredited
1971	Diamonds Are Forever	Casino Croupier	Uncredited
1975	One of Our Dinosaurs Is Missing	Fake Chauffeur	Uncredited
1977	The Spy Who Loved Me	Liparus Guard	Uncredited
1981	Silver Dream Racer	1st Japanese man	
1982	Pink Floyd – The Wall	Paramedic	
1983	Privates on Parade	Cheng	
1986	Little Shop of Horrors	Chang Da-Doo	
1987	Three Kinds of Heat	Fan	
1987	Ping Pong	Chinese gambler	
1989	Batman	Crime lord #1	
2001	Kiss of the Dragon	Minister Tang	
2002	Die Another Day	General Li	
2005	Batman Begins	Old Asian prisoner	

=== TV series ===
Year	Title	Role	Notes
1969	The Avengers	Toy	Episode: "The Interrogators" (uncredited)
1970	Monty Python's Flying Circus	Mr. Kamikaze	Episode: "How to Recognise Different Parts of the Body"
1972, 1977, 1983	Doctor Who	Various	Serials: "Day of the Daleks", "The Talons of Weng-Chiang" and "Enlightenment"
1973	The Two Ronnies	Waiter	1 episode
1975	The Sweeney	Japanese tourist	Episode: "Supersnout"
1975	Space: 1999	Medic; Toshiro Fujita	4 episodes
1976	It Ain't Half Hot Mum	Assassin	Episode: "Pale Hands I Love"
1977	Warship	MC	Episode: "The Girl from the Sea"
1977	The New Avengers	Courier	Episode: "Trap" (uncredited)
1978	Gangsters	Triad Member	Episode: "The Dictate of Shen Tang"
1978	Return of the Saint	Embassy Guard	Episode: "Assault Force" (uncredited)
1980–1982	The Professionals	Kidnapper; Colonel Lin Foh	2 episodes
1981	The Chinese Detective	Mr. Hong	2 episodes
1981	Goodbye Darling	Luis	2 episodes
1983	Reilly, Ace of Spies	Captain	Episode: "Prelude to War"
1984	Duty Free	Chinaman	Episode: "Casino"
1984	Tenko	Raffles Barman	2 episodes (uncredited)
1986	Mind Your Language	Fu Wong Chang	13 episodes
1987	Howards' Way	Hitoshi Serozawa	2 episodes
1988	Noble House	Lim Chu	4 episodes
1990	Agatha Christie's Poirot	Chinaman	Episode: "The Lost Mine"
1991	Lovejoy	Tanaka's Minder	Episode: "Riding in Rollers" (uncredited
1992	One Foot in the Grave	Chinese chef	Episode: "The Broken Reflection"
1992	Screenplay	Tu Do	Episode: "Small Metal Jacket"
1994	Between the Lines	Thai restaurant manager	Episode: "A Face in the Crowd"
1994	Performance	Dr Chen	Episode: "Summer Day's Dream"
1996	Bramwell	Mr. Tielyn	1 episode
1997	Captain Butler	Old Man	Episode: "Desert Island Dick"
1998	Jonathan Creek	Pan Duc Lao	Episode: "Black Canary"
2002	Im Visier der Zielfahnder	Chang	Episode: "Die Falle"
2006	Ministry of Mayhem	Mr Lee	1 episode
2006	The First Emperor	Lu Buwei	TV movie documentary
