= Robert Lee (British actor) =

Chinese actor (1913–1986)

- Lee as Tarō Nagazumi in Mind Your Language
- Born: Lee Ya Fu; 30 November 1913; Tianjin, Republic of China
- Died: 1 December 1986 (aged 73); Hampstead, London, England
- Education: Trinity College, Cambridge (BA)
- Occupation: Actor
- Years active: 1944–1986
- Known for: Mind Your Language; The Chinese Detective

Robert Ya Fu Lee (30 November 1913 – 1 December 1986) was a Chinese actor based in the United Kingdom.

== Background ==
Born in Tianjin, he arrived in England as an international student, attaining a BA in history from Trinity College, Cambridge. He then worked at a Chinese restaurant and a Japanese restaurant before being encouraged by friends to become an actor in 1944. Lee played supporting roles in many films and television programmes throughout the 1960s, 1970s and 1980s, and was frequently called upon whenever a production required an East Asian character. His film appearances include You Only Live Twice (1967) and Half Moon Street (1986), and his television appearances include The Avengers, The Chinese Detective and The Bill, but his best known role is as Tarō Nagazumi, the Japanese business executive and English language student, in the sitcom Mind Your Language from 1977 to 1979. He never married, citing marriage in a 1984 interview as "Too much responsibility", and lived in a flat in Hampstead, North London, where he died after two years of ill health on 1 December 1986, aged 73.

== TV and filmography ==
Year	Title	Role	Notes
1944	Dragon Seed	Young Farmer	Uncredited
1951	Outcast of the Islands	Extra in Snooker Room scenes	Uncredited
1954	The Desperate Women	Publisher	
1960	The World of Suzie Wong	Barman	Uncredited
1961	Visa to Canton (also known as Passport to China in the USA)	Chinese Officer	
1961	The Sinister Man	Nam Lee	
1962	Satan Never Sleeps	Chung Ren	
1967	You Only Live Twice	2nd Chinese VIP	Uncredited
1967	The Mini-Affair	Manager - Chinese Restaurant	
1968	Don't Raise the Bridge, Lower the River	Bruce	
1969	The Chairman	Hotel Night Manager	
1969	Moon Zero Two	Hotel Employee	Uncredited
1971	The Projectionist	Usher / Henchman	
1975	Bakit May Bilanggo Sa Anak Ni Eba		
1975	Rollerball	Executive	Uncredited
1979	Porridge	Tinkler	
1982	Tout feu, tout flamme	aka All Fired Up	Tout feu tout flamme (France: DVD title)
1982	Britannia Hospital	Mr. Banzai	
1983	High Road to China	Zura	
1986	Half Moon Street	Chinese Ambassador	
1987	A Cor do seu Destino	The Officer	
1987	Ping Pong	Mr. Chen	(final film role)

== Television ==
Year	Title	Role	Notes
1960	ITV Television Playhouse	Chinese newsreader	Episode: "Bridge of Sighs"
1960	Knight Errant Limited	Po Kong	Episode: "A Touch of the Orient"
1961	The Arthur Askey Show		Episode: "Pilbeam, the Journalist"
1961	Edgar Wallace Mysteries (also known as The Edgar Wallace Mystery Theatre in the USA)	Mr. Nam Lee	Episode: "The Sinister Man"
1962	A World Inside	Joseph Yap	TV film
1963	Compact	Restaurant Proprietor	Episode: "Chicken and Champagne"
1963	The Odd Man	Kosugi	Episode: "The Long Wound"
1963	The Sentimental Agent	Ling	Episode: "Finishing School"
1963	The Avengers	Mr. Lo	Episode: "The Golden Fleece"
1964	Diary of a Young Man	Buddhist	Episode: "Life, or a Girl Called Fred"
1965	ITV Play of the Week	Cardinal of Macao	Episode: "The Successor"
1965	Danger Man	Chin Lee	Episode: "Loyalty Always Pays"
1965	Dixon of Dock Green	Mr. Ling	Episode: "Witness Summons"
1966	Breaking Point	Shoni	
1967	Hugh and I		Episode: "Chinese Crackers"
1967	Danger Man	Manager of Two-Tailed Dragon	Episode: "Shinda Shima"
1967	Armchair Theatre	Mr. Li	Episode: "Any Number Can Play"
1967	Jackanory	Narrator	5 episodes - Narrating traditional Chinese tales
1967	Sexton Blake	Kir Tan	3 episodes
1974–1979	Hawaii Five-O	Airport Guard / Kauai Police Captain / Capt. Tanaka / Lew Kameka / Tas	5 episodes
1976–1978	It Ain't Half Hot Mum	Bandit / Chung Soo	2 episodes
1977–1979	Mind Your Language	Tarō Nagazumi	Series 1–3
1978	Gangsters	Shen Tang	4 episodes
1979	Grange Hill	Ling Ching	1 episode
1980	The Professionals	Shusai	Episode: "Wild Justice"
1981-1982	The Chinese Detective	Joe Ho	7 episodes
1983	Reilly: Ace of Spies	Admiral Togo	Episode: "Prelude to War"
1984	Hammer House of Mystery and Suspense	Chong Woy	Episode: "Mark of the Devil"
1984	The Bill	Chinese Restaurateur	Episode: "A Friend in Need"
1984	Tenko	Mr. Ling	1 episode
1985	John and Yoko: A Love Story	Eisuke Ono	TV film
