= The Chinese Detective =

British television police procedural series

- Genre: Police procedural
- Created by: Ian Kennedy Martin
- Written by: Ian Kennedy Martin; Edward Boyd
- Starring: David Yip; Derek Martin; Arthur Kelly; Larrington Walker; Robert Lee; Allan Surtees; John Bott; Richard Rees
- Composer: Harry South
- Country of origin: United Kingdom
- Original language: English
- No. of series: 2
- No. of episodes: 14

Production
- Producer: Terence Williams
- Cinematography: Peter Chapman
- Editor: Bill Wright
- Running time: 60 minutes
- Production company: BBC Studios

Original release
- Network: BBC One
- Release: 30 April 1981 – 5 November 1982

The Chinese Detective is a British television police procedural drama series, first transmitted by the BBC in 1981 and 1982. The series was created by Ian Kennedy Martin, who had previously devised The Sweeney and Juliet Bravo.

== Plot ==
The series starred British Chinese actor David Yip as Detective Sergeant John Ho. Yip became the first Chinese lead actor in any British television drama series. The series offered traditional police procedural storylines in a setting of occasional prejudice and distrust within the police force, and the prejudice displayed by those Ho encounters whilst doing his job. Like many other television detectives of the time, Ho was something of a maverick, often using unorthodox methods to solve crimes. The series was set in and around London's Docklands, before redevelopment began in the 1980s.

His immediate superior in the force, Detective Chief Inspector Berwick (Derek Martin), was often a source of stress, reprimanding him for his approach towards the cases he was investigating. Ho is also often seen visiting his father, Joe (Robert Lee), for advice at the shipping container plant where he worked. Like many other television detectives of the era, Ho drove a 'classic' car: a Morris Minor Traveller.

== Cast ==
- David Yip as Detective Sergeant John Ho
- Derek Martin as Detective Chief Inspector Berwick
- Arthur Kelly as Detective Sergeant Donald Chegwyn
- Larrington Walker as Ezra
- Robert Lee as Joe Ho
- Allan Surtees as Ex-Detective Chief Inspector Marley-Harris
- John Bott as Detective Chief Superintendent Halsey
- Richard Rees as Dr David Li (Series 2)

== Episodes ==
=== Series overview ===
series
Series	Episodes	Originally released	
Series	Episodes	First released	Last released
1	6	30 April 1981	4 June 1981
2	8	10 September 1982	5 November 1982

=== Series 1 (1981) ===
No.	Title	Directed by	Written by	Original release date	UK viewers (millions)
1	"Release"	Ian Toynton	Ian Kennedy Martin	30 April 1981	N/A
A released prisoner, a smashed window and a terrified wife lead Detective Sergeant John Ho to discover that past crimes breed present strife and future violence. Guest stars: Alan Ford (Jack Arthur Bross), Shirley Stelfox (Arlene), Ahmed Khalil (Jamshid Kamal), Jack Le White (Old Harry Rose), Sarah Lam (Mei)
2	"Hammer And Nails"	Terry Green	Ian Kennedy Martin	7 May 1981	N/A
The murder of a Chinese club owner sets John Ho in the middle of a gangland struggle for power – and into the bad books of Chief Inspector Berwick. Guest stars: Vincent Wong (Mr. Hong), Helen Keating (Sandra Beatty), Brian Croucher (Jack Mangan), Matthew Scurfield (Det. Insp. Gratton), John Judd (Roy Kinnock), James Marcus (Charlie), David Sibley (Derek), Keith Hodiak (West Indian club member), Andy Ho (Wung Ling)
3	"The Four from Fulham"	Ian Toynton	Ian Kennedy Martin	14 May 1981	N/A
Mr Hong holds the key to a big prize which the Fulham gang are desperate to win. John Ho observes them all, and witnesses the evil result of ambition and greed. Guest stars: Vincent Wong (Mr. Hong), Helen Keating (Sandra Beatty), Brian Croucher (Jack Mangan), Matthew Scurfield (Det. Insp. Gratton), John Judd (Roy Kinnock), Michael Melia (Milner), Peter Dean (Greg), Anthony Heaton (Hartley), Albert Moses (Mr. Banerjee), Jim McManus (Eel & Pie Shop Proprietor), James Marcus (Charlie)
4	"Income Tax"	Ian Toynton	Ian Kennedy Martin	21 May 1981	N/A
An-ex villain wants to put his dishonest ways behind him, so is not best pleased to be reminded of his past by the tax man and John Ho. Guest stars: Lee Montague (Reg Purnell), Nicholas McArdle (David Melvyn), Marc Zuber (Sheik Ahmed Mahmoud), Renu Setna (Mr. Patel), Jacob Witkin (Mr. Shamal), Kenneth Gilbert (Sgt. Porritt), Bill Treacher (Bus driver), Dicken Ashworth (Large man), Ishia Bennison (Consulate receptionist)
5	"Washing"	Tom Clegg	Ian Kennedy Martin	28 May 1981	N/A
Ho becomes involved in a complex Chinese puzzle when a singer becomes the victim of a hit-and-run. Guest stars: Fiesta Mei Ling (Anna Wo), Kay Tong Lim (Scarface), Fred Lee Own (Chung Ling), Chua Kahjoo (Li Wo), Phillip Tan (Chinese villain), Frank Coda (Det. Sgt. Carrier)
6	"Ice And Dust"	Tom Clegg	Ian Kennedy Martin	4 June 1981	N/A
Ho gambles his own life to accomplish his personal mission. Guest stars: Ian Hendry (Eddie Dwyer), Roger Sloman (Roger Horrabin), Peter Schofield (Det. Chief Insp. Maunsell), Michael Melia (Milner), Peter Dean (Greg), Paul Barber (Ned)

=== Series 2 (1982) ===
Episode #	Title	Directed by	Written by	Original air date	UK viewers (in millions)
1	"Trials"	Ian Toynton	Ian Kennedy Martin	10 September 1982	N/A
It is the first day of a trial at the Old Bailey and Ho has to deal with a couple of O.A.P's, a twelve-bore shotgun and a fleet of three-wheeled cars. Guest stars: Maurice Denham (Edward Ruthven), Frank Gatliff (Defending Counsel), Neil Hallett (Mr. Fisher), Nat Jackley (Rex Madden), John Kidd (Judge)
2	"Oblomov"	Terence Williams	Ian Kennedy Martin	17 September 1982	N/A
Ho has viral pneumonia and Dr Li prescribes 'ten days horizontal' - but a visit from informer, Jack Bross, rouses Ho from his sickbed. Guest stars: Alan Ford (Jack Arthur Bross), Paul Antrim (Chief Insp. Seddon), Michael Barrington (Chief Supt. Nuttall), Ron Emslie (Det. Sgt. George Whatley), John Savident (Don Lidell), Robert Russell (Eric Leggatt), Albert Moses (Mr. Patel), Merdelle Jordine (Myra), Barry Smith (Doctor)
3	"Wheels Within Wheels"	David Green	Ian Kennedy Martin	24 September 1982	N/A
Jack Longman's good with figures - but a stolen Mercedes and a ledger set Ho on course for another result - but not the one he had in mind. Guest stars: Rudolph Walker (Terence Villiers), George Sewell (Jack Longman), Rosemary Martin (Greta Longman), Brian Coburn (Smith), Philip Dunbar (Mr. Elderton), Keith James (Pete)
4	"Tapdancer"	Ian Toynton	Ian Kennedy Martin	1 October 1982	N/A
A mother's cry for help sends Ho in search of a missing boy. With tap shoes and a cassette player, Tommy is no ordinary boy. Guest stars: Edward Hardwicke (Det. Chief Insp. Lovell), Bryan Marshall (George Bourne), Linda Marlowe (Greta Mancey), Ron Emslie (Det. Sgt. George Whatley), Ben Howard (Dave Mancey), Marc Gilbey (Tommy Mancey), Pam St. Clement (Aunt Daisy)
5	"Bounty Hunter"	Laurence Moody	Eddie Boyd	8 October 1982	N/A
When a Glaswegian gunfighter rides into Limehouse there's blood on the streets - but Doc Halliday's fantasies explode in other people's faces. Guest stars: Maurice Roëves (Doc Halliday), Michael Attwell (Harry Foss), John Horsley (Dr. Green), Tony Calvert (Menace), Stevan Rimkus (Brush), Arnold Yarrow (Old Man), Martin Gower (Barman)
6	"Chorale"	Jeremy Summers	Ian Kennedy Martin	15 October 1982	N/A
Jack Balfe, a well-known East End fence, wants distinguished Tenor Robert Tear to sing at his daughter's birthday party - but no one, least of all Ho, is going to stop him. Guest stars: George Baker (Jack Balfe), Derren Nesbitt (Gunther Esslin), Roy Pattison (1st German), Roy Scammell (2nd German), Valentine Palmer (SDP Candidate), Peter Craze (SDP Agent), Reg Woods (Sergeant)
7	"Pasts"	Leonard Lewis	Eddie Boyd	22 October 1982	N/A
Routine searches and an irritable Berwick don't appeal to Ho. When a pile of bones is found in a derelict house, Ho sees a chance to escape both. Guest stars: James Ellis (Father Gorman), Peter Copley (Cunninghame-Price), John Collin (Arbuckle), Patsy Smart (Mrs. Jenkins), Albert Moses (Mr. Patel), Declan Mulholland (Foreman), Ray Float (Postman)
8	"Secret State"	Brian Lighthill	Ian Kennedy Martin	5 November 1982	N/A
Ho deals with a fatal shooting, but discovers there is no corpse. The only witness is an old lady and her budgies, but soon other parties begin to show interest in the case. Guest stars: Paul Antrim (Chief Insp. Seddon), Tony Caunter (Pollitt), Patrick Malahide (Colin Bennett), Michael Robbins (Caretaker), Anna Wing (Alice Walden), Maurice O'Connell (Loughlin), Peter Spraggon (Charlie Miller), John Rolfe (Special Branch Man)

== Home media ==
Both series were released on DVD in the UK in a complete box set on 14 April 2008.
