= Lucy Sheen =

British East Asian actress and activist

- Born: Lucy Chau Lai-Tuen; British Hong Kong
- Education: Rose Bruford College of Speech and Drama (BA)
- Occupations: Actress; playwright

Lucy Sheen, born Lucy Chau Lai-Tuen, is a British East Asian actress, playwright, and activist. She starred in the 1986 film Ping Pong and was a founding member of the organisation BEATS (British East Asians working in Theatre and Screen), an advocacy group on behalf of British East Asians in the arts.

== Early life ==
Sheen was born Lucy Chau Lai-Tuen in Kowloon, British Hong Kong. She was abandoned as a baby, and was one of 106 transracially adopted children from the 1950s until 1963 through the Hong Kong Project. Sheen arrived in the UK in 1963; her ethnicity was not talked about in her family, and she later expressed feelings of rejection from both white and East Asian communities. She graduated from Rose Bruford College of Speech and Drama in 1984, being the first Chinese British actress to graduate from drama school.

== Career ==
Sheen's first professional acting credit was in a leading role in Ping Pong (1986). The film was one of the first Chinese British films, and the first to be filmed on location in London's Chinatown. She works as a professional actor, appearing on stage, and on TV shows such as Casualty, Call the Midwife, and Eastenders.

Sheen has been outspoken about her cultural identity and stereotyping of East Asians in the arts. She wrote a feature in the 2018 book Foreign Goods: A Selection of Writings by British East Asian Artists, edited by Jingan Young. She was one of the founding members of BEATS (British East Asians working in Theatre and Screen) along with Jennifer Lim and Daniel York Loh, a group dedicated to the advancement of representation for British Asian actors. To encompass different heritages and cultures, the group embraced a pan-Asian identity. The organisation was originally formed under the name British East Asian Artists (BEAA) in the wake of a casting controversy in 2012–2013 by the Royal Shakespeare Company's production of The Orphan of Zhao. In 2019 the group objected to the lack of East Asian writers on the children's sitcom Living with the Lams, with Sheen joining over 100 other industry professionals in signing a letter to the BBC protesting the conditions of the show's production. For the term 2025–2027, she was elected to the Equity trade union's Race and Equality Committee.

In 2020, Sheen wrote the titular drama in an online theatre project entitled WeRNotVirus, a series directed Jennifer Tang and Anthony Lau in response to the rise in racism during the COVID-19 pandemic. A review in The Guardian gave the whole project three stars out of five, referring to Sheen's piece as the "most rousing" of the short plays.

== Credits ==
Year	Title	Role	Notes	Refs
1986	Ping Pong	Elaine Choi	Directed by Po-Chih Leong	
1987	Business as Usual	Rowena Freeman	Directed by Lezli An-Barrett	
1996	Secrets and Lies	Nurse	Directed by Mike Leigh	
2010	Hungry Ghosts	Pin-De	Directed by Tim Luscombe, theatre	
2015	Abandoned Adopted Here		Director, documentary short film	
2024	The Listeners	Teresa	Directed by Janicza Bravo	
2025	Back in Action	Yao Fang	Directed by Seth Gordon	
