= David Young (TV producer) =

British television producer

David Young is a British television producer. In 2001, as the Head of Light Entertainment for the BBC, he created the television programme Weakest Link.

== Biography ==
Young began his career as a runner for Hat Trick Productions in the early 1990s after graduating from Bristol University with a BA Honours degree in Drama. He later secured a development deal with Hat Trick where he went on to create and produce Whatever You Want for BBC One. Following a brief spell creating and producing his own formats at Endemol UK, he became the youngest ever Head of Light Entertainment at BBC Television in 1999. At the BBC, Young and his team created a string of hits including: Friends Like These, Dog Eat Dog, Jet Set and The Weakest Link. In 2001 Young quit the BBC to set up 12 Yard with his former employers Hat Trick. Six years later, Young sold the business to ITV plc for £35 million in December 2007.

Since joining ITV Studios the company continue to prosper. In early 2009 they signed a £15 million output deal with the BBC after agreeing to produce their programmes Eggheads, In It To Win It, and Who Dares Wins from Glasgow, Scotland. The latest 12 Yard success is Coach Trip, the reality game show, which relaunched on Channel Four in April 2009. The success of Coach Trip led to a Channel Four recommissioning a 50 episode run.

Young launched Hindsight Productions.

== Credits ==
=== United Kingdom ===
- The Weakest Link
- Dog Eat Dog
- Friends Like These
- Jet Set
- Whatever You Want
- Nothing but the Truth
- Foot in the Door
- Playing for Time
- In It to Win It
- Eggheads
- Who Dares Wins (a.k.a. The Rich List/Money List)
- Without Prejudice?
- Coach Trip
- The Great British Village Show
- The Colour of Money

=== United States ===
- The Weakest Link (NBC)
- Dog Eat Dog (NBC)
- The Benefactor (ABC)
- The Rich List (Fox)
- Without Prejudice? (GSN)
- The Money List (GSN)
