= Rich List =

Rich List or The Rich List may refer to:

== Lists of rich people ==
- Financial Review Rich List, formerly BRW Rich 200, a list of Australia's wealthiest individuals and families
- National Business Review Rich List, an annual list of richest New Zealanders
- Sunday Times Rich List, a list of the wealthiest people or families resident in the United Kingdom

== Television shows ==
- The Rich List (American game show), original version of the game
- The Rich List (Australian game show), 2007–2009
- Rich List (German game show), 2007–2008

== See also ==
- Who Dares Wins (British game show), based on the American show
- Forbes 400, or 400 Richest Americans, a list published by Forbes magazine
- The World's Billionaires, an annual list compiled by Forbes
- Bloomberg Billionaires Index, a daily ranking of the world's top 500 richest people
- List of Chinese by net worth
- List of French billionaires by net worth
- List of South Korean billionaires by net worth
- List of wealthiest families
- List of wealthiest organizations
