= The Rich List (Australian game show) =

- Genre: Game show
- Created by: 12 Yard
- Presented by: Andrew O'Keefe
- Country of origin: Australia
- Original language: English
- No. of seasons: 3
- No. of episodes: 40

Production
- Production location: HSV-7 in South Melbourne, Victoria
- Running time: 60 minutes (Including commercials)

Original release
- Network: Seven Network
- Release: 29 January 2007 – 14 January 2009

The Rich List is an Australian game show which is based on the format initially created for transmission in the United Kingdom created by 12 Yard called Who Dares Wins (not to be confused with the stunt and dare show of the same name). The game consists of two teams who name as many items relating to a topic as they can while competing against each other for a no-limit cash prize. For its first season, it was shown on Monday nights at 7:30 pm on the Seven Network but moved to Saturday nights in the same timeslot for the second season, before being put on hiatus and returning to its original season-one timeslot.

The show premiered in its regular Monday timeslot on 29 January 2007 at 7:30 pm and continued with a special episode on 30 January to give people a chance to watch the show who opted to watch Steve Irwin's last documentary Ocean's Deadliest which went up against The Rich List on Monday the 29th on the rival station, the Nine Network. The show is recorded at the Melbourne Central City Studios. This version follows the basic rules of other versions of the show.

The program is hosted by the Deal or No Deal host Andrew O'Keefe. The pilot episode was taped on 18 October 2006. The show began taping episodes for air on 11 December 2006.

The first series of The Rich List ended on 25 June 2007, after a season of steady consistent ratings of 1.1 to 1.3 million viewers. A second series began airing 24 May 2008, although just 721,000 viewers tuned into the season premiere episode, placing the Seven Network fourth out of five in its timeslot. After the second episode rated 715,000 viewers, the Seven Network initially pulled The Rich List from the schedule, but it returned from hiatus a few months later on 3 November 2008. The Rich List has been put back on hiatus from 14 January 2009; no new episodes have been produced since then.

The voice-over introducing the show is Marcus Irvine, notable for being the voice of past game show The Weakest Link.

== Gameplay ==
The Gameplay is similar to the format used in the United States (although, despite the fact that an entire series was filmed with Eamonn Holmes as host, it has never been aired). It consists of two rounds. A best of three no money amount lists followed by "The Rich List" where a team can win $250,000 for completing each list with 15 answers. There is no limit to how many "Rich Lists" a team can partially or fully complete and therefore, teams are capable of winning an unlimited amount of money.

=== Best of three lists ===
Two teams of two players, one of which are the champions from the previous episode and the other are a new pair of challengers, are presented to the audience. The two teams, who have not met before the show, are placed in separate soundproof isolation booths, with audio that is turned on or off by the host. He announces the category for the list, such as "Wimbledon Men's Singles champions" or "Squares from a Monopoly board" then asks the challengers to place a bid on the number of items they must name to win the list. The host switches the audio on and off between the booths as the bidding continues. Note that if players do not feel they can bid higher than their opponents' bid, they can choose to bluff their bids (as the opponent side cannot hear the team's conversations) in an attempt to pressure the opponents to raise their bid further. The host turns both audios on when one team has challenged the other to fulfill the bid.

The challenged team must list in a row as many items as their bid in order to win the list. If the team makes one mistake along the way, the list is awarded to their opponents.

The first team to win two lists has won the best of three and goes on to play "The Rich List".

=== Tiebreaker ===
If each team wins one list apiece, a sudden death tiebreaker is played. The host gives the category, both booths are switched on, and the teams alternate their answers. In order to win the list and the best of three, one team must give an incorrect answer while the other team gives a correct answer. In case if both teams fail to name an item on the same turn, both teams get another chance to name another item. Should that fail, another tiebreaker list will be used to break the tie.

=== The Rich List ===
The winning team moves on to play "The Rich List" where Andrew gives the team a new category and the chance to supply up to 15 correct answers. Winnings increase after every third correct answer is given, according to the following table.

Right Answers	Winnings
3	$10,000
6	$25,000
9	$75,000
12	$150,000
15	$250,000

If a wrong answer is given at any time, the team loses all accumulated money they won from that "Rich List", but all winnings from previous "Rich Lists" that the team may have completed are safe. After every third answer, they can choose to stop playing, winning all the money accumulated from the current "Rich List" or play on, until the team lists all fifteen answers, therefore winning $250,000. Regardless of the outcome, the team then returns to the isolated soundproof booths to play the game again against a new pair of opponents. Only a loss when playing "The Best of three lists" can eliminate teams from the show.

=== Errors ===
Many lists in the show are known to have mistakes or inaccurate information in them. The list about countries adopting the euro contained a country called "Holland", which is in fact a region of the Netherlands. There have also been other mistakes in lists such as "Island Nations" where the list included nations that share the land territory of the island with other nation-states, and "Top 20 countries with the most land area". A list of nation's common names beginning with B listed Bermuda, which is a British Overseas Territory, and Britain, which is the name of the island on which the United Kingdom, except Ireland, is situated. A list of countries beginning with A also accepted America, as it "is the way most Australians would say it", despite the country in question actually being called the United States of America. The term 'country' was replaced with Sovereign States to avoid such confusion or partial duplication.

== Ratings ==
The show's premiere on 29 January placed fourth in daily ratings and second in its timeslot Ocean's Deadliest on Nine Network, which aired at the same time as The Rich List, attracted about 250,000 more. However, the show performed better in the next episode. Despite attracting less viewers than 1 vs. 100 in the first few weeks, the show attracted 40,000 more viewers on 5 March.

The show is usually in the top 20 most watched programs each week according to ratings measuring company OzTAM.

Today Tonight aired a feature article on the Rich List and interviewed two contestants, Bec and a guy who named at least 15 British Prime Ministers. They won $250,000 but couldn't get the money until the episode was actually shown.

== List of episodes ==
=== Season 1 (2007) ===
No. overall	No. in season	Original release date	Australian viewers
1	1	29 January 2007	1,410,000
Lists: Countries with coastlines bordering the Mediterranean Sea; Animated Disney Films 1980-2006 (including Pixar films); Events in a decathlon Sudden Death; Wimbledon Gentlemen's Singles champions The Rich List; Celebrities that have appeared on the Australian Dancing with the Stars; Squares which appear on the UK Monopoly board; The 50 most populous cities in the United States The Rich List
2	2	30 January 2007	1,560,000
Lists: Australian prime ministers; Top 50 Test match cricket wicket takers; Gifts from "The Twelve Days of Christmas" Sudden Death; Elton John's hit singles, reaching Top 40 in Billboard Hot 100 The Rich List; The top 50 breeds of dog in Australia; Tom Cruise movies; Summer Olympic host cities The Rich List
3	3	5 February 2007	1,400,000
Lists: Recurring characters on The Muppet Show; 50 most popular boys names; Films that won Best Oscar Picture 1970-2006 The Rich List; Countries starting with "B"; Beatles top hits; Bryce Courtenay novels (including novels co-authored) The Rich List
4	4	12 February 2007	1,170,000
Lists: Mel Gibson movies; 50 most popular Irish surnames; 100 top earning sports stars according to BRW's 2006 Top Earners List The Rich List; Recurring characters from M*A*S*H; Elvis Presley songs reaching the Australian Top 10 singles list; Songs from The Sound of Music soundtrack Sudden Death; The 30 most populous countries The Rich List
5	5	19 February 2007	1,160,000
Lists: Nicole Kidman movies; List of sovereign states ending in "ia" (present day countries only); Australian Open Men's Singles champions The Rich List; Commonwealth or Empire games host cities; Queen songs from the stage musical We Will Rock You; American TV shows that became films (excluding cartoons) The Rich List
6	6	26 February 2007	1,190,000
Lists: Countries starting with "S"; 30 highest scoring Test cricket batsmen; Eric Bana movies Sudden Death; Cities served by the world's 30 busiest airports for passenger traffic The Rich List; Australian of the Year recipients (1960–2006); Words ending in "Berry"; Names used in the NATO phonetic alphabet Sudden Death; John Grisham novels The Rich List
7	7	5 March 2007	1,270,000
Lists: The Top 25 countries visited by tourists; Robin Williams movies; Names of Popes since 1000 AD The Rich List; National capitals beginning with the letters A, B or C; The Rolling Stones top 40 UK singles; Actors who have played the television Doctor Who Sudden Death; Number one ranked men's singles players (1973–2006) The Rich List
8	8	12 March 2007	1,230,000
Lists: Countries starting with "A"; Brad Pitt movies; Musicals composed by Andrew Lloyd Webber Sudden Death; Neil Diamond Top 20 songs in the Billboard Hot 100 The Rich List; Recurring characters in Happy Days; Countries that qualified for the 2006 FIFA World Cup; Famous people mentioned in Madonna's song "Vogue" Sudden Death; Presidents of the United States The Rich List
9	9	19 March 2007	1,160,000
Lists: Characters featured in the Mr. Men series of books by Roger Hargreaves; Instruments in a standard Symphony Orchestra; Independent countries that were former Soviet Republics. The Rich List; Breeds of dog starting with "B"; Tom Hanks movies; William Shakespeare plays The Rich List
10	10	26 March 2007	1,380,000
Lists: Varieties of Pasta; U.S. states ending in the letter "A"; ARIA Hall of Fame inductees The Rich List; Books of the New Testament; Featured films directed by Alfred Hitchcock; Letters with a point value of 1 in Scrabble Sudden Death (Note: This list was not broadcast due to the list ending up in a tie); Maria's favorite things from The Sound of Music Second Sudden Death; Sovereign states whose flags are Red, White and Blue The Rich List
11	11	2 April 2007	1,340,000
Lists: Current Deal or No Deal case values; Countries without an ocean coastline; The 12 top earning deceased celebrities of 2006 Sudden Death; Australian swimmers who have won individual gold medals at the Olympic Games The Rich List; The 30 top richest Australians in 2006; Wilbur Smith novels; Current Ranks in the Australian Army The Rich List
12	12	16 April 2007	1,350,000
Lists: Top 40 Cat names in Australia; Academy Award for Best Actor winners since 1970; Named characters from the original Star Wars Trilogy The Rich List; Universities in Australia; Actors who have voiced characters in Shrek and Shrek 2; Countries which drive on the left hand side The Rich List
13	13	16 April 2007	1,350,000
Lists: Theatrically released Elvis Presley movies; Australian Open Women's Singles champions from 1970; Tom Clancy novels Sudden Death; The 20 highest selling passenger and 4WD vehicles in Australia for 2006 The Rich List; Characters from the Disney film Snow White and the Seven Dwarfs; Individuals who have been named Time Magazine's Person of the Year; Countries where French is an official language The Rich List
14	14	30 April 2007	1,220,000
Lists: Top 50 most popular girls' names in Australia of 2006; Stevie Wonder singles reaching the Top 10 in the UK and the US; Countries part of the European Union The Rich List; Theatrically released Julia Roberts movies; U.S. states with a saltwater coastline; Top 30 top earning Australian entertainers of 2006 The Rich List
15	15	7 May 2007	1,270,000
Lists: Actresses who have played Bond girls in the James Bond films; Island countries; Characters from Thomas the Tank Engine and Friends Sudden Death (Note: This list was not broadcast due to Andrew O'Keefe claiming he had accidentally mentioned one of the characters on the list which was later submitted by Paula and Michael); Performers as billed at the 1969 Woodstock Festival Second Sudden Death; Characters from Lewis Carroll's novel Alice's Adventures in Wonderland The Rich List; Capital cities of Europe; Kylie Minogue singles; Actors and actress who have won more than one Academy Award for Best Actor or Actress The Rich List
16	16	14 May 2007	1,240,000
Lists: Theatrically released films based on Stephen King novels; Cities which have hosted the Winter Olympic Games; Past and present staff members at Hogwarts School from the Harry Potter books Sudden Death; The top 20 largest countries by area The Rich List; The top 40 Dog names; Members of the Commonwealth of Nations; Villains from the Batman movies and 60's TV shows Sudden Death; List of the 30 highest-grossing films of all time The Rich List
17	17	21 May 2007	1,290,000
Lists: People who made the "Most Foolish American" list; Current OPEC member countries; Types of Mushrooms Sudden Death; The top 40 most expensive cities to live in worldwide The Rich List; Elements of the Periodic table; Jerry Bruckheimer produced theatrically released films; Current teams of the Australian Soccer A-League Sudden Death; Members of the Young Talent Time team The Rich List
18	18	28 May 2007	1,300,000
Lists: Top 20 most played sports in Australia; Modern birthstones; Planets of the Solar System Sudden Death; Countries currently using the euro The Rich List; Thomas the Tank Engine characters; Current Australian ministers in the Federal cabinet; Songs in the Saturday Night Fever soundtrack Sudden Death; Names of countries with the letter "Y" in it The Rich List
19	19	4 June 2007	1,280,000
Lists: Hosts of the Academy Awards since 1980; The first 25 people in the line of succession to the British Throne; Scrabble letters worth one point Sudden Death; People who have appeared in the banknotes of the Australian dollar The Rich List; Members of the Simpson family; Symbols in the top line of the QWERTY keyboard; Member economies of the Asia-Pacific Economic Cooperation The Rich List
20	20	11 June 2007	1,270,000
Lists: Competitive styles of dance on Australia's Dancing with the Stars; Melbourne Cup winners; Australian places mentioned in the original song "I've Been Everywhere" Sudden Death; TV series produced by Aaron Spelling The Rich List; Characters in A. A. Milne's Winnie-the-Pooh books; Australian cat breeds; Gilbert and Sullivan operas Sudden Death; Feature films with a "7" in its title The Rich List
21	21	18 June 2007	1,290,000
Lists: Songs from the Soundtrack of The Boy From Oz; Towns and suburbs in Australia starting with "Port"; Countries that have Spanish as an official language The Rich List; Theatrically released Russell Crowe movies; Roald Dahl books; Nut varieties grown commercially in Australia Sudden Death; The 30 most trusted professions in Australia The Rich List
22	22	25 June 2007	1,260,000
Lists: Celebrity guest performers on Kath & Kim; 40 most common grape varieties grown in Australia for wine; Best Oscar Picture that originally appeared on Broadway Sudden Death; African countries ending with "A" The Rich List; James Patterson novels; Top 50 movie hero characters; Musical acts who have performed the opening title track of official Bond films The Rich List

=== Season 2 (2008–2009) ===
No. overall	No. in season	Original release date	Australian viewers
23	1	24 May 2008	729,000
Lists: UNICEF Goodwill Ambassadors; Current Cricket World Cup teams; Books by Dr. Seuss The Rich List; Denominations on the Australian postage stamp; Sports in the Summer Olympic Games; Theatrically released films starring Audrey Hepburn The Rich List
24	2	31 May 2008	715,000
25	3	3 November 2008	966,000
Lists: Suspects, objects and rooms in Cluedo; Political parties that ran in the 2007 Australian federal election; U.S. states sharing a land border with Canada Sudden Death; The 30 most commonly written words in the English language The Rich List; Seeded players in the 2008 Australian Open; Countries supported by the World Vision sponsor a child program; Oscar winners for Best Actress in a leading role 1980–2006 The Rich List
26	4	10 November 2008	926,000
27	5	17 November 2008	1,016,000
28	6	24 November 2008	1,210,000
29	7	1 December 2008	1,075,000
30	8	8 December 2008	1,094,000
31	9	15 December 2008	993,000
32	10	22 December 2008	988,000
Lists: Performers who were in the original Band Aid group; Credited actors and actresses from the TV series Fast Forward; Top 20 countries from which citizens immigrate to Australia The Rich List; Names of the Little Miss characters created by children's author Roger Hargreaves; Films in which Clint Eastwood has been credited as an actor; Australians who have won more than one gold medal at a Summer Olympic Games The Rich List
33	11	29 December 2008	896,000
Lists: Characters from the TV series Grey's Anatomy; Australian swimmers who have held a world record; Floral, faunal, and bird emblems of the Australian states and territories The Rich List; Capital cities of the US states; Theatrically released Hugh Grant films; Letters of the Greek alphabet The Rich List
34	12	4 January 2009	896,000
Lists: Original United Nations member states (from 1945); Actors who have been nominated for a Best Actor Oscar in the 2000s; Current ranks of the Royal Australian Navy The Rich List; Towns and suburbs in Australia which contain the word "town"; US Presidents from the 19th century; Animals in the Chinese zodiac Sudden Death (Note: This list was not broadcast due to the list ending up in a tie); The 12 most common letters in the Concise Oxford Dictionary Sudden Death; Members of the Logies Hall of Fame The Rich List
35	13	5 January 2009	1,004,000
Lists: Theatrically released films that Johnny Depp has appeared in; The 30 most common elements in the universe; London Underground lines Sudden Death; Sovereign states beginning with the letter "C" The Rich List; Nobel Peace Prize laureates; The 50 gayest songs of all time; The 20 most commonly spoken languages in the world The Rich List
36	14	11 January 2009	727,000
37	15	12 January 2009	1,111,000
38	16	18 January 2009	951,000
Lists: People who have appeared on the TV show "It Takes Two"; 30 Most Marketable Australian Sports Men and Women; Names of Santa Claus's reindeer in the Poem "T'was the night before Christmas" Sudden Death; States of the United States of America whose names end in a consonant Rich List; Cate Blanchett movies; Wine making regions of Australia; Countries on the World Health Organization list of Worlds 30 Fattest Countries Rich List
