= Playing for Time =

Playing for Time may refer to:

- Playing for Time (film), a 1980 American TV movie written by Arthur Miller
  - Playing for Time or Sursis pour l'orchestre, a book by Fania Fénelon
- Playing for Time (game show), a 2000-01 UK quiz programme
- "Playing for Time", a song by Buzzcocks from All Set
- "Playing for Time", a song by Uriah Heep, a non-album B-side from Head First
- "Playing for Time", a song by Peter Gabriel from his 2023 album i/o
