= Whatever You Want =

Whatever You Want may refer to:

== Music ==
- Whatever You Want (album), a 1979 album by the British band Status Quo
- Whatever You Want – The Very Best of Status Quo, 1997 compilation album by the British band Status Quo
- "Whatever You Want" (Pink song), 2017
- "Whatever You Want" (Status Quo song), 1979
- "Whatever You Want" (Tina Turner song), 1996
- "Whatever You Want" (Tony! Toni! Toné! song), 1991
- "Whatever You Want", a single from the album Beautiful Sharks by Something for Kate, 1999
- "Whatever You Want" a song by Crowded House from the album Dreamers Are Waiting, 2021
- "Whatever You Want", a song from the album Stand for Myself by Yola, 2021

== Other uses ==
- Whatever You Want, RPM Productions TV show with Keith Allen (actor), 1982
- Whatever You Want (game show), Hat Trick Productions show with Gaby Roslin 1997

== See also ==
- "Whatever U Want", a 2004 song by Christina Milian
- "Whatever U Want" (Consequence song), 2009
- "Whatever U Want", a song by Weki Meki from the 2019 album Lock End LOL
