= Sorority Girls (TV series) =

- Genre: Reality television
- Created by: Josephine Brassey; Liz Gaskell
- Directed by: Marcus Liversedge
- Creative directors: Alison Knowles; Sally Lock
- Starring: Dominique Kruse; Amelia Smith; Arianna Kjos; Devan Lockhert; Hannah Hagler
- Country of origin: United Kingdom
- Original language: English
- No. of series: 1
- No. of episodes: 8

Production
- Executive producers: Andy Culpin; Michael Mannes; Matt Walton
- Producer: Josephine Brassey
- Production locations: Leeds, United Kingdom
- Running time: 47 minutes
- Production company: 12 Yard

Original release
- Network: E4
- Release: 8 November – 26 December 2011

Sorority Girls is a show that first aired on E4 on Tuesday 8 November 2011. The show follows female students from England who compete to become members of Britain's first ever sorority, in Leeds. The show aired on Tuesdays at 9 PM. Every week one student is eliminated, leaving five final girls. The final five were Maxine Howarth as Entertainment Chair, Charlotte ('char-char') Bridgewater as Standards Chair, Camille (Mille) Whitty as Philanthropy Chair, Katie Hames as president, and Sophie Rason as Social Chair.

The girls from Leeds were welcomed by the Sorority Sisters "American Girls": Amelia Smith (President), Arianna Kjos (Philanthropy Chair), Devan Lockhert (Social Chair), Dominique Kruse (Standards Chair), Hannah Hagler (Entertainment Chair). For a Rush Day, where wannabe Sorority Girls must face a series of interviews from the Sorority Sisters to determine provisional membership.

Fifty female British university students show up to the house, but only 20 will be invited to the exclusive evening party called 'Preference', where the girls have a final chance to sway the Sorority Sisters.

As the Brit girls struggle to impress with their 'hidden talents', the Sorority Sisters must reach a final decision on who will become 'Pledges' and take up the 14 places available in the house.

The 14 chosen pledges were:

- Alana Elliott
- Alex Fraser
- Camille Whitty
- Charlotte Bridgewater
- Chloe White
- Christal Barrymore
- Christiana Bell
- Claudia Wright
- Helen White
- Katie Hames
- Maxine Howarth
- Nadia Khiavi
- Sophie Rason
- Topaz Dominique
