= Wright Around the World =

- Genre: Game show
- Created by: BBC Format Entertainment
- Presented by: Ian Wright
- Country of origin: United Kingdom
- Original language: English
- No. of series: 2
- No. of episodes: 18

Production
- Running time: 35 minutes (2003); 40 minutes (2004-05)

Original release
- Network: BBC One
- Release: 25 October 2003 – 8 January 2005

Related
- The National Lottery Draws

Wright Around the World is a BBC National Lottery game show broadcast on BBC One from 25 October 2003 to 8 January 2005. It was hosted by Ian Wright.

== Format ==
Six contestants competed for a chance to win their tailor-made holiday around the world, where they choose where they want to go, and the show does the rest for them. Before the show, the host Ian Wright would search the UK for six contestants looking for their dream trip around the world, and would ask them a simple general-knowledge question. If the contestant gets the answer to the question right, they get to go on the show.

=== Round One ===
A globe ball machine containing eight red globes and four green globes are mixed in a machine known as 'The Globetrotter'. The colours are hidden when the twelve globes are released into the machine and mixed, and they remain unlit when the twelve globes rise out into their allocated numbers. For a contestant to pick a globe, the host would read out a question, and the contestant who thinks that they know the answer to the question has to buzz in and answer the question correctly. If they answer correctly, they get to choose a number that's in play, if that number is a green globe, they get given a bonus question, which if they answer correctly, gets them through to the next round and the chosen number that was a green globe goes out of play, or if they answer incorrectly on either the buzzer question or bonus question, or take too long to respond after buzzing in, they go back to where they've started, and potentially allowing another contestant to take advantage of remembering where that green globe is if they buzz in and answer correctly. If after buzzing in, answering correctly, and the contestant chooses a number that's a red globe, they would also go back to where they've started. The round continues until four contestants make it through to Round 2, and the remaining two contestants are eliminated from the game.

=== Round Two ===
After the Thunderball draw, a musical performance by a song artist would follow, with some facts about the singer or group shown on the screen, in which the contestants have to try and remember for round two, since the host would ask these questions for round two, and the contestant who thinks that they know the answer to the question buzzes in. As before, the rules are the same as Round One, but instead of trying to find one green globe, the contestant now has to find two green globes. As before, 'The Globetrotter' mixes the twelve globes again. If the chosen globes are both green, once again the host would ask a bonus question to the contestant to get through to the final round. If both globes are red, or is one green and one red, the contestant goes back to where they've started. This round continues until two contestants make it through to the final round.

=== Final Round ===
After the Lotto and Lotto Extra draws, the two remaining contestants have 90 seconds to try and win their tailor-made round the world trip. To help these contestants, all of the answers to these questions asked by the host are names of places. The two contestants have two globes each, and if they buzz in and answer correctly, they win a globe from their opponent, but if they buzz in and answer incorrectly or take too long to respond after buzzing in, they are frozen out of the next question. Whoever has the most globes at the end of 90 seconds gets to win their holiday. If it's a tie at the end of 90 seconds, the host would ask a tiebreaker question, and whichever contestant buzzes in and answers correctly wins.

== Transmissions ==
Series	Start date	End date	Episodes
1	25 October 2003	13 December 2003	8
2	23 October 2004	8 January 2005	10
