= Dale's Great Getaway =

2012 British game show

- Presented by: Dale Winton
- Country of origin: United Kingdom
- No. of episodes: 1

Production
- Production location: The London Studios
- Running time: 60 minutes

Original release
- Network: ITV
- Release: 29 December 2012

Dale's Great Getaway is a British entertainment game show which aired on ITV on 29 December 2012. Presented by Dale Winton, the show features three families competing in a series of challenges hoping to win up to £15,000 and a holiday.

== Challenges ==
Three families competed over five challenges. Each challenge featured a different country and the contestants had to perform a challenge related to that country. For example, a challenge on Mexico had the families listen to songs played in the mariachi style and try to guess the title of the song being played. The families scored points in each challenge and the lowest scoring family after challenge four was eliminated and won a holiday to Bognor Regis. The winners of the fifth challenge advanced to the final and won a holiday to The Bahamas; with the losers winning a holiday to Bergen.

== Final ==
The winning family had to answer five questions in order to win money.
