= Holding Out for a Hero (game show) =

- Genre: Game show
- Presented by: Gethin Jones
- Country of origin: United Kingdom
- Original language: English
- No. of series: 1
- No. of episodes: 8

Production
- Running time: 60 minutes (inc. adverts)
- Production company: 12 Yard

Original release
- Network: ITV
- Release: 11 September – 30 October 2011

Holding Out for a Hero is an ITV entertainment programme in which contestants won't win money for themselves, but for somebody else, who they considered to be their hero. The show is presented by Gethin Jones. Every week, three contestants compete to win a huge sum of money for a charity close to their heart.

== Format ==
Every time, three contestants are aiming to win the money for a charity close to their heart or hearts.

Their job in the show is answering five multiple-choice questions correctly so that they'll have an opportunity to help the "hero". Each correct answer will add the cash to their own Jackpot. The cash value is chosen by the contestants from the cash cards which are placed around the table. However, if the contestant gets a wrong answer to a single question, the corresponding amount which chosen by him/her is subtracted from his/her own Jackpot.

The person who has the biggest number of Jackpot wins the game. The others also win a small prize of money as a consolation.

=== The lifelines ===
Each contestant has three lifelines:

- 1. Double: Double the prize money.
- 2. Triple: Triple the prize money.
- 3. Dodge: Give up for the current question and the game goes on.

Each of the lifelines can only be used once during the game, and a contestant has no way to use more than one of the lifelines on one single question.

== International versions ==
=== China ===
The Chinese version of this show is called "全星全益" (in simplified Chinese, pinyin: Quan Xing Quan Yi), which is presented by Zhou Qun. This version is airing on Anhui TV network, and its premiere was aired on 23 October 2013.

The show is airing at 22:00(UTC+8) every Wednesday on Anhui TV, and the theoretical top prize is CN¥ 149,000.

==== Chinese Version's Money Tree ====
The Chinese version's cash cards' cash values is ranging from CN¥1,000 (US$164) to CN¥20,000 (US$3,282), and the cash values are the integer multiples of CN¥1,000. A perfect game is worth CN¥149,000 (about US$24,451).

=== Thailand ===
The Thai version is called Holding Out for a Hero อัจฉริยะนักวีรบุรุษ.
