= Dale Winton =

English radio DJ and television presenter (1955–2018)

- Winton in 2016
- Born: Dale Jonathan Winton; 22 May 1955; Marylebone, London, England
- Died: 18 April 2018 (aged 62); Whetstone, London, England
- Occupations: Radio DJ, television presenter
- Years active: 1972–2018
- Television: Supermarket Sweep (British game show) (1993–2001, 2007); In It to Win It (2002–2016); Hole in the Wall (2008)
- Parents: Gary Winton (father); Sheree Winton (mother)

Dale Jonathan Winton (22 May 1955 – 18 April 2018) was an English radio DJ and television presenter. He presented the shows Supermarket Sweep from 1993 until 2001 and again in 2007, the National Lottery game show In It to Win It between 2002 and 2016 and the 2008 series of Hole in the Wall. Winton also presented Pets Win Prizes (1995–96) and The Other Half (1997–2002).

== Early life ==
Winton was born on 22 May 1955 to a Jewish father, Gary Winton, and actress Sheree Winton, a Jewish convert. Winton's father died on the day of his bar mitzvah, after which he was brought up by his mother. Winton's mother took her own life in 1976 by taking a barbiturate overdose, while suffering from depression.

== Career ==
=== Radio ===
Winton started DJing in clubs in Richmond in 1972, where he met Steve Allen, the LBC radio presenter. The two remained friends thereafter, and lived together for a period as well as going on holiday together. From there he had a selection of jobs including selling timeshares. In 1982, Winton moved to London and began his entertainment career on the London club circuit, where he DJ'd at weekends. This led him to the United Biscuits Radio Network where he did a variety of jobs working for Adrian Love, before getting his own morning show. From here he joined Radio Trent in Nottingham, where he presented a weekend show, moving to the weekday mid-morning show, before leaving in 1985, and going on to work at a number of other local radio stations including Chiltern Radio, Beacon Radio (in Wolverhampton, for 3 years) as well as Blue Danube Radio in Vienna, Austria.

In 2000, Winton took over from Alan Freeman to present Pick of the Pops on BBC Radio 2, and hosted the show until 30 October 2010, when Tony Blackburn replaced him. Winton sat in for Steve Wright and Liza Tarbuck on BBC Radio 2, covering the latter's Saturday show in September 2013 and November–December 2016.

=== Television ===
Winton began his television career in 1986 on Pet Watch, before working for Channel 4, Lifestyle Channel and ITV. From 1993 to 2000, he hosted Supermarket Sweep during the daytime TV period on ITV. In 2007, Supermarket Sweep was revived after a 5 1/2-year absence. Winton portrayed himself as an irritating game show presenter in Danny Boyle's 1996 film Trainspotting.

In 1995–96, Winton presented BBC's Saturday night game show Pets Win Prizes. In 1997, he presented the final of The Great British Song Contest, the national selection for the Eurovision Song Contest, due to a tie-in with the lottery programme. Between that year and 2002, he also presented a dating show called The Other Half. In 1999, he appeared on the sitcom Gimme Gimme Gimme with Kathy Burke in the episode Do They Take Sugar?

In 2000, he presented Barbara Windsor – Hall Of Fame 2000 TV Special, the induction of Barbara Windsor as the first artist to be inducted into the new BBC Hall of Fame.

He was the subject of This Is Your Life in 2000 when he was surprised by Michael Aspel. In 2001, he presented Channel 5's endurance show Touch the Truck. In 2002, Winton began presenting the National Lottery game show In It to Win It. In 2003, he appeared in the BBC Three mockumentary, Dale's Wedding, in which he supposedly married the UK celebrity Nell McAndrew.

From 2003 to 2004, he hosted two series of Stars Reunited where the casts of popular British television series were reunited after many years. Between 2004 and 2006, he presented three series of the celebrity weight loss "boot camp" programme, Celebrity Fit Club on ITV.

Winton presented BBC One's Saturday night entertainment programme Hole In The Wall in 2008, based on the Japanese original, where contestants in skin-tight lycra costumes contorted themselves to fit through oddly-shaped holes in a moving wall. The show returned for a second series in 2009 but Anton Du Beke replaced Winton as host. Winton began appearing in television advertisements for cashmygold.co.uk in 2010. Winton appeared on Matt Lucas and David Walliams' BBC comedy series Come Fly With Me. He appeared in the last episode of the series, playing himself. In 2012, he hosted one-off ITV game show Dale's Great Getaway and in February 2018, Winton hosted travelogue series Dale Winton's Florida Fly Drive aired on Channel 5.

== Personal life ==
In 2002, Winton released his autobiography in which he wrote about his rise to fame and his actress mother's suicide, and came out as homosexual. In a 2016 op-ed for the Conservative Woman website, he revealed his interest in American politics, expressing his disappointment over Mitt Romney's loss of the 2012 US presidential election. He described Donald Trump's candidacy announcement for the 2016 US presidential election as "car crash TV", but added that Trump was "truly authentic".

== Death ==
On 18 April 2018, Jan Kennedy, Winton's long-term agent, announced that he had died at his home. On 19 April, a spokesman for Scotland Yard said that police were treating the death as "unexplained", but did not believe it to be suspicious. According to his friend Gloria Hunniford: "Dale had a lot of things going wrong, he had pain with arthritis, he had a heart complaint, he had a chest infection, and we all know how the winter affected that. He had asthma as well." The coroner concluded that Winton died of natural causes.

He had recently moved from a £2.9 million apartment in Regent's Park to a property in Whetstone, north London. His friends celebrated his life with a non-religious humanist funeral ceremony by Humanists UK on 22 May 2018, his birthday. His eulogy was preserved as part of a public historical archive of humanist funerals.
