= Big Star's Little Star =

British game show

- Genre: Game show
- Created by: Stefan Iriarte and Liz Gaskell
- Presented by: Stephen Mulhern
- Voices of: Jonathan Gould
- Country of origin: United Kingdom
- Original language: English
- No. of series: 5
- No. of episodes: 33 (inc. 1 special)

Production
- Running time: 60 minutes (inc. adverts)
- Production company: 12 Yard

Original release
- Network: ITV
- Release: 4 September 2013 – 1 September 2018

Big Star's Little Star was a British game show that was broadcast on ITV from 4 September 2013 to 1 September 2018 and was presented by Stephen Mulhern. The show saw three celebrity contestants and their children or grandchildren answering questions about each other to win up to £15,000 for a charity of their choice.

== Format ==
=== Round 1 ===
The celebrities (known as the 'Big Stars') were asked the same multiple choice questions as their children or grandchildren (known as the 'Little Stars') with the aim being to answer the same. Each of the celebrities were given three questions in turn with the children's or grandchildren's answers pre-recorded and shown on screen.

=== Round 2 ===
The celebrities watched a series of clips of their children or grandchildren describing several everyday items with the aim being to identify what their children or grandchildren were describing. They were awarded two points if they could identify the items after the first clue and one point after the second clue was given.

=== Round 3 ===
The celebrities and their children or grandchildren were given three pictures. They would then be asked a question about either the celebrity or their child/grandchild/children/grandchildren and both of them would have needed to answer A, B or C with the objective being that they would answer the same, despite not being able to see each other. At the end of this round, two celebrity pairs left the programme with £1,000 for their chosen charities, leaving the winning pair to play in the fourth and final round.

=== Round 4 ===
The winning celebrity and their child/grandchild/children/grandchildren played for £15,000 for charity. As they would have already made it through to the final, they would automatically win £5,000. In the final round, the two were given 10 pairs of images that mean something to the family that are hidden behind 20 squares on the screen. The images are displayed on the screen for five seconds and then they had to work together to match up as many pairs as they can before time ran out. Every pair that they match would earn them an extra £1,000 for their charity. If all 10 were matched, the team won £15,000 for their charity.

== Transmissions ==
=== Series ===
Series	Start date	End date	Episodes
1	4 September 2013	9 October 2013	6
2	26 March 2014	14 May 2014	8
3	4 March 2015	8 April 2015	6
4	2 March 2016	6 April 2016	6
5	28 July 2018	1 September 2018	6

=== Special ===
Date aired	Title
30 December 2015	Christmas Special

== Episodes ==
=== Series 1 ===
Episode	Date aired	Big Star	Little Star(s)
1	4 September 2013	Nina Wadia	Aidan
1	4 September 2013	Will Mellor	Renee
1	4 September 2013	Jamelia	Tiani
2	11 September 2013	Sinitta	Magdelena
2	11 September 2013	Robbie Savage	Freddie
2	11 September 2013	Duncan James	Tianie-Finn
3	18 September 2013	John Barnes	Isy
3	18 September 2013	Claire Richards	Charlie
3	18 September 2013	Edwina Currie	Zoe
4	25 September 2013	Lucy Pargeter	Lola
4	25 September 2013	Andrew Whyment	Thomas
4	25 September 2013	Rosemary Shrager	Freddie
5	2 October 2013	Tina Hobley	Olivia
5	2 October 2013	Jim Moir	Nell and Lizzie
5	2 October 2013	Jenny Frost	Caspar
6	9 October 2013	Sally Bercow	Jemima
6	9 October 2013	Diarmuid Gavin	Eppie
6	9 October 2013	Suzanne Shaw	Corey

=== Series 2 ===
Episode	Date aired	Big Star	Little Star(s)
1	26 March 2014	Ben Cohen	Isabelle and Harriet
1	26 March 2014	Denise Lewis	Ryan
1	26 March 2014	Neil Ruddock	Pebbles
2	2 April 2014	Gary Lucy	India
2	2 April 2014	Kaye Adams	Bonnie
2	2 April 2014	Neil Fox	Martha
3	9 April 2014	Sam Bailey	Tommy
3	9 April 2014	Shane Lynch	Billie Rae
3	9 April 2014	Alison Hammond	Aiden
4	16 April 2014	David Dickinson	Finley
4	16 April 2014	Samantha Womack	Lili-Rose
4	16 April 2014	Michael Owen	James
5	23 April 2014	Simon Gregson	Alfie
5	23 April 2014	Paula Radcliffe	Isla
5	23 April 2014	Natasha Hamilton	Harry
6	30 April 2014	Alex James	Artie and Gally
6	30 April 2014	Michaela Strachan	Oliver
6	30 April 2014	Aldo Zilli	Twiggy
7	7 May 2014	Jake Wood	Buster
7	7 May 2014	Austin Healey	Betsy and Bibi-Dee
7	7 May 2014	Sunetra Sarker	Noah
8	14 May 2014	Nicky Byrne	Jay and Rocco
8	14 May 2014	Joe Absolom	Lyla
8	14 May 2014	Rachel Allen	Scarlett

=== Series 3 ===
Episode	Date aired	Big Star	Little Star(s)
1	4 March 2015	Joe Swash	Harry
1	4 March 2015	Sharron Davies	Finley
1	4 March 2015	Duncan Bannatyne	Ava
2	11 March 2015	Ronan Keating	Ali
2	11 March 2015	Sheree Murphy	Matilda
2	11 March 2015	Carl Froch	Rocco
3	18 March 2015	Peter Andre	Princess
3	18 March 2015	Saira Khan	Zac
3	18 March 2015	Danny Dyer	Sunnie
4	25 March 2015	Jimmy Bullard	Archie
4	25 March 2015	Tricia Penrose	Freddy
4	25 March 2015	Martin Offiah	Tyler
5	1 April 2015	Mo Farah	Rhianna
5	1 April 2015	Rita Simons	Maiya and Jaimee
5	1 April 2015	John Prescott	Ava Grace
6	8 April 2015	Jo Whiley	Coco
6	8 April 2015	Dominic Brunt	Danny
6	8 April 2015	Nick Hewer	Theo

=== Special ===
Episode	Date aired	Big Star	Little Star
Christmas Special	30 December 2015	Michael Vaughan	Archie
Christmas Special	30 December 2015	Fiona O'Carroll	Felix
Christmas Special	30 December 2015	Robbie Fowler	Jacob

=== Series 4 ===
Episode	Date aired	Big Star	Little Star
1	2 March 2016	Lee Ryan	Rayn
1	2 March 2016	Nitin Ganatra	Sameer
1	2 March 2016	Samantha Giles	Eve
2	9 March 2016	Harry Redknapp	Bobby
2	9 March 2016	Vincent Simone	Luca
2	9 March 2016	Debra Stephenson	Zoe
3	16 March 2016	Kym Marsh	Polly
3	16 March 2016	Vince Cable	Charlie
3	16 March 2016	Elliott Wright	Olivia
4	23 March 2016	Shaun Ryder	Pearl
4	23 March 2016	Diane Parish	Kaya
4	23 March 2016	Mikey Graham	Sienna
5	30 March 2016	Jamie Theakston	Sidney
5	30 March 2016	Shappi Khorsandi	Cassius
5	30 March 2016	James Anderson	Lola
6	6 April 2016	Matthew Wolfenden	Buster
6	6 April 2016	Nina Hossain	Clara
6	6 April 2016	David Haye	Cassius

=== Series 5 ===
A fifth series was confirmed and filming took place during the summer of 2017.

Episode	Date aired	Big Star	Little Star
1	28 July 2018	Stacey Solomon	Zachary
1	28 July 2018	John Thomson	Sophia
1	28 July 2018	Jenny Powell	Pollyanna
2	4 August 2018	Sally Phillips	Tom
2	4 August 2018	Samia Ghadie	Freya
2	4 August 2018	Kian Egan	Koa
3	11 August 2018	Abbey Clancy	Sophia
3	11 August 2018	Tristan Gemmill	Wilfred
3	11 August 2018	Sarah Beeny	Rafferty
4	18 August 2018	Ken Bruce	Charlie
4	18 August 2018	Faye Tozer	Benjamin
4	18 August 2018	Jodie Kidd	Indio
5	25 August 2018	James Cracknell	Kiki
5	25 August 2018	Karen Blick	Ruby
5	25 August 2018	Vernie Bennett	Avery
6	1 September 2018	Una Foden	Aoife
6	1 September 2018	Kate Silverton	Clemency
6	1 September 2018	Kriss Akabusi	Alanam

== Big Star's Bigger Star ==
Big Star's Bigger Star
- Genre: Game show
- Presented by: Stephen Mulhern
- Voices of: Jonathan Gould
- Country of origin: United Kingdom
- Original language: English
- No. of series: 1 (inc. 1 special)
- No. of episodes: 5

Production
- Running time: 60 minutes (inc. adverts)
- Production company: 12 Yard

Original release
- Network: ITV
- Release: 15 December – 30 December 2018

Related
- Text Santa

In 2015, the series was reversioned as Big Star's Bigger Star for a Text Santa special with celebrities and their parents. A four-part series, for which filming took place during summer 2017, premiered on 15 December 2018 and ended on 30 December 2018.

=== Transmissions ===
Series	Start date	End date	Episodes
Special	18 December 2015		1
1	15 December 2018	30 December 2018	4

=== Episodes ===
==== Special ====
Episode	Date aired	Big Star	Bigger Star
Text Santa Special (Note: During the broadcast, Caroline Flack surprised Mulhern with an appearance by his father, Christopher.)	18 December 2015	Emma Willis	Billy
Text Santa Special	18 December 2015	Jennie McAlpine	Tom
Text Santa Special	18 December 2015	George Shelley	Toni

==== Series 1 ====
Episode	Date aired	Big Star	Bigger Star
1	15 December 2018	Adam Thomas	Dougie
1	15 December 2018	Frankie Bridge	Viv
1	15 December 2018	Joel Dommett	Penny
2	22 December 2018	Kym Marsh	Pauline
2	22 December 2018	Harry Judd	Emma
2	22 December 2018	Simon Webbe	Marlene
3	29 December 2018	Emma Willis	Cathy
3	29 December 2018	Andrew Whyment	Fred
3	29 December 2018	Andrea McLean	Jack
4	30 December 2018	Roman Kemp	Martin Kemp
4	30 December 2018	George Lamb	Larry Lamb
4	30 December 2018	Jess Wright	Carol Wright

== International versions ==
Country/language	Local title	Host	Channel	Date aired/premiered
Belgium	Grote Ster, Kleine Ster (Big Star, Little Star)	Koen Wauters	vtm	3 September 2014
Hungary	Vigyázat, gyerekkel vagyok! (Watch out, I'm with a child!)	Nóra Ördög	TV2	1 March 2017
Romania	Aici eu sunt vedeta! (Here I am the star!)	Cosmin Seleşi	Antena 1	12 October 2017
Russia	Большая маленькая звезда (Bolshaya malegnkaya zvezda, Big Little Star)	Nikolay Baskov	STS	12 September 2015
Spain	Jugando con las estrellas (Playing with the Stars)	Jaime Cantizano	La 1	11 March 2017
Ukraine	Обережно:) діти! (Oberezhno:) dity! Be careful:) children!)	Andriy Domanskyi	Inter	12 April 2014
USA	Big Star Little Star	Cat Deeley	USA Network; Universal Kids	31 May 2017; 10 February 2018
Vietnam	Biệt tài tí hon (Little but special)	Trấn Thành	VTV3	1 January 2017

== Awards and nominations ==
In 2018, Big Star's Little Star made the longlist for the Bruce Forsyth Entertainment Award at the 2019 National Television Awards. However, the programme did not end up making the shortlist.
