= Rich List (German game show) =

- Rich List – Jede Antwort zählt
- Genre: Game show
- Presented by: Kai Pflaume
- Country of origin: Germany
- Original language: German
- No. of seasons: 2
- No. of episodes: 24

Original release
- Network: Sat.1
- Release: 26 May 2007 – 26 July 2008

Rich List – Jede Antwort zählt ("Rich List – Every Answer Counts") is the German version of the American game show The Rich List which in turn was based on the British game show Who Dares Wins on Sat.1, that premiered on May 26, 2007 at 7:15 pm. Sat.1 renewed the show for a second season. On August 29, 2007 the show was to move to the prime time slot of Wednesdays at 8:15 pm. The show is hosted by Kai Pflaume. This is the first non-English-language version of the show to air.

== Main Game ==
Two teams of two players each competed. The teams were placed in separate soundproof isolation booths, with audio that could be turned on or off by the host, much like the Twenty-One game show. He would announce the category for the list, such as "Tom Cruise Movies" or "Top 50 Broadway Shows of All Time," and the teams would take turns bidding on how many they think they could name.

The host would switch the audio on and off between booths as the bidding continued, then turn them both on when one team challenged the other to fulfill the bid. The challenged team would then need to come up with that many correct answers in a row in order to win the list. One mistake would award it to their opponents.

== Profit ==
Right Answers	Winnings
3	€5,000
6	€10,000
9	€25,000
12	€50,000
15	€100,000
