= Pets Win Prizes =

British game show

- Genre: Game show
- Created by: David McGrath; Andy Mayer
- Presented by: Danny Baker (1994); Dale Winton (1995–96)
- Announcer: Bobby Bragg (1995–96)
- Composers: David Arnold; Paul Hart
- Country of origin: United Kingdom
- Original language: English
- No. of series: 3
- No. of episodes: 22

Production
- Running time: 40 minutes

Original release
- Network: BBC1
- Release: 16 July 1994 – 3 August 1996

Pets Win Prizes is a game show that aired on BBC1 from 16 July 1994 to 3 August 1996. It was originally hosted by Danny Baker for the first series and then Dale Winton took over as host for the subsequent two series.

== Format ==
In the first rounds, the owners' pets competed in games of skill and agility - depending on what animal they were, this could vary from snail racing to dog pool. The owner whose pet won each game had to randomly choose between two envelopes, one of which contained a prize for them, and the other a prize for their pet.

The final round took the form of a 3-minute quick-fire quiz, where the owners had to answer animal-related trivia questions. For every correct answer, a cardboard representation of their animal moved along a race track; five correct answers were required to reach the end. The first player to the end of the track (or the one with the most correct answers after 3 minutes) was declared the winner.

The prize for the final was determined by a cat known as "The Professor", who would be placed on the centre of a hexagonal board, which was divided into six sections, each of which corresponded to a prize. The owner won the prize from whichever section The Professor's front paws were in after 30 seconds.

== Transmissions ==
Series	Start date	End date	Episodes
1	16 July 1994	20 August 1994	6
2	24 June 1995	26 August 1995	10
3	29 June 1996	3 August 1996	6
