= Come and Have a Go If You Think You're Smart Enough =

- Also known as: The National Lottery: Come and Have a Go
- Genre: Game show
- Created by: Tailor Made Films; The Chatterbox Partnership
- Presented by: Nicky Campbell (2004); Julian Clary (2005)
- Starring: Emily Maitlis (Question Master: 2005)
- Country of origin: United Kingdom
- Original language: English
- No. of series: 2
- No. of episodes: 16

Production
- Running time: 70 minutes (2004); 50 minutes (2005)
- Production company: Tailor Made Films

Original release
- Network: BBC One
- Release: 3 April 2004 – 25 June 2005

Related
- The National Lottery Draws

Come and Have a Go If You Think You're Smart Enough, also known as The National Lottery: Come and Have a Go for series 2, is a BBC National Lottery game show broadcast on BBC One from 3 April 2004 to 25 June 2005.

The programme was originally hosted by Nicky Campbell, for the first series until Julian Clary took over to host the show for the second series.

== Gameplay ==
=== Series 1 ===
The prize fund of each episode started at £30,000 and increases with each new participating party. Viewers would enter the show from home by calling a premium-rate number, with each call costing 50p, 15p of which was added to the prize fund. After signing in, they were able to play by any of the following methods:

- Interactive television via digital satellite or BBC co-owned digital terrestrial service.
- Via internet, with a browser that supported Flash.
- By a mobile phone that supported Java.

All home teams in the UK played for one position in the show's final, while four studio teams of four competed for the other.

The registration deadline in each episode would be around 3 minutes following the opening. If a team failed to register in time, they may still play the game but would be ineligible to compete for the cash prize. Studio audience members would also play along using keypads, but were also ineligible to win.

==== Main game ====
Each main game consisted of 35 questions in 6 topics, the first of which was always General Knowledge (though questions of this topic skewed heavily towards pop culture in the first 4 episodes), while the other 5 would change each episode. There were 10 General Knowledge questions, followed by 5 groups of 5 questions of each new category.

Each question featured 4 options (represented A, B, C, D; similarly to the coloured buttons on a TV remote) and all players had 10 seconds to lock in an answer, with time starting as soon as the options appeared. Some questions were accompanied with musical or visual excerpts. Team members may confer to find answers. A team scored 1 point for every correct answer.

Home teams would answer all 35 questions, while one studio team with the lowest score would be eliminated after Question 10, Question 25 and Question 35. The last studio team standing would compete with the smartest home team.

If two or more studio teams tied for last place, they would answer as many toss-up questions as required eliminations. Each question was in the form of a sliding image, with the pieces sliding to their right places and the teams having to identify the person in the image. A right answer kept the team in the game, while a wrong answer eliminated them.

Home teams that had scored 26 points or more would then receive a code and a phone number on their medium. They would dial that number and provide the code, then answer 5 more questions within 10 seconds each. The team that correctly answered the most of the first 4 questions the quickest would be that week's smartest home team, with Question 5 being a tiebreaker. A runner-up was also kept on stand-by.

Then, a motorbike and video phone of the show's associates in the winning team's area would arrive at their place and broadcast it live. If the video equipment could not reach the destination in time, only the voice of the team via telephone would be heard.

==== Final ====
Each team was given 8 questions: one of each previously featured special category in a random order, followed by 3 General Knowledge questions. A right answer added 1 point to the team's score, while a miss forfeited their score up to that point. Each team was also given a "pass" to give a question to their opponents. A passed question may not be passed back.

The first question was given to the team that scored more in the main game. Each question had a 10-second time limit, though the time would start after the options were read out.

The team with more points at the end of the round won the cash prize and a spot in the next show as returning champions. If both teams tied after all questions, the team that started this round was given 4 answer options of a randomly chosen question, and was given the option to play or pass the question. A right answer won the team the game, while a wrong answer gave the win to their opponents.

== Transmissions ==
Series	Start date	End date	Episodes
1	3 April 2004	8 May 2004	6
2	23 April 2005	25 June 2005	10
