= We've Got Your Number =

1999 British game show

- Genre: Game show
- Presented by: Brian Conley
- Country of origin: United Kingdom
- Original language: English
- No. of series: 1
- No. of episodes: 13

Production
- Running time: 25 minutes
- Production company: Bazal Productions

Original release
- Network: BBC One
- Release: 27 February – 22 May 1999

Related
- The National Lottery Draws

We've Got Your Number is a BBC National Lottery game show broadcast on BBC One from 27 February to 22 May 1999. It was hosted by Brian Conley.

== Ratings ==
Episode no.	Airdate	Viewers (millions)	BBC One weekly ranking
1	27 February 1999	10.30	5
2	6 March 1999	9.62	9
3	13 March 1999	8.24	13
4	20 March 1999	9.43	5
5	27 March 1999	9.32	6
6	3 April 1999	—N/a	—N/a
7	10 April 1999	8.62	10
8	17 April 1999	7.95	16
9	24 April 1999	7.14	18
10	1 May 1999	8.44	9
11	8 May 1999	8.07	10
12	15 May 1999	7.83	11
13	22 May 1999	8.44	8
