= Pressure Pad =

- Genre: Game show
- Presented by: John Barrowman
- Country of origin: United Kingdom
- Original language: English
- No. of series: 2 (regular); 1 (celebrity)
- No. of episodes: 45 (regular); 5 (celebrity)

Production
- Production location: BBC Pacific Quay
- Running time: 45 minutes
- Production companies: 12 Yard; BBC Scotland

Original release
- Network: BBC One (2013–14); BBC Two (2014)
- Release: 4 November 2013 – 3 October 2014

Pressure Pad is a BBC game show which was hosted by John Barrowman. It aired on BBC One from 4 November 2013 to 19 September 2014 and BBC Two from 22 September to 3 October 2014.

== Format ==
Two five-member teams compete in four head-to-head contests, with each team sending a different player other than their captain into every contest. The players face off on the Pressure Pad, a large circular platform set into the stage floor that can display graphics or information as required for the specific contest. Both players start with two lives; the first to lose both of them is eliminated from the game, while the winner advances to the final with his/her team captain. A coin toss is used to decide which player has initial control in each contest.

In the final, all questions are multiple-choice, and the team that won more contests plays first. The captain may confer with his/her surviving teammates (if any) before choosing an answer by stepping onto it. A correct response allows the team to advance to the next question, but a miss turns control over to the opposing team so that they can answer their own series of questions. The first captain to give a total of four correct answers (not necessarily consecutive) wins the game for his/her team. The number of answer choices available to the team in control increases by one for each of their correct responses, starting with two on the first question and ending with five on the fourth.

=== Series 1 ===
The winning team could either accept a prize of £2,000 and end the game, or gamble that money on a final question with six answer choices. A correct response allowed the team to keep the £2,000 and also awarded a jackpot that began at £1,000 and increased by that amount every day until it was won. If the team missed the final question, they forfeited all of their winnings.

=== Series 2 and Celebrity Pressure Pad ===
The team that won the final did not receive any money immediately, but had to play the final question. A correct answer awarded a jackpot that began at £3,000 and increased by that amount each day until it was won. The captain was not allowed to confer with his/her teammates on this question.

== Transmissions ==
=== Regular series ===
Series	Start date	End date	Episodes
1	4 November 2013	6 December 2013	25
2	8 September 2014	3 October 2014	20

=== Celebrity series ===
Series	Start date	End date	Episodes
1	1 September 2014	5 September 2014	5

== International versions ==
The Greek channel ERT1 was the first international broadcaster to launch a local format of the show, called Στην πίεση (Stin piesi) and hosted by Evgenia Samara.

Country	Name	Presenter	Channel	Broadcast
Greece	Στην πίεση Stin piesi	Evgenia Samara	ERT1	September 7, 2025 – June 26, 2026
