= The National Lottery Results =

British television programme

- Graphics used from 2006–13
- Also known as: The National Lottery Live (1994–97, 2013–16); The National Lottery Draw(s) (1997–2013); The National Lottery Stars (1999–2001); The National Lottery Results
- Voices of: Alan Dedicoat (1995–); Charles Nove (Stand-in, 1995–2016)
- Country of origin: United Kingdom
- Original language: English

Production
- Production locations: BBC Television Centre (1994–2006); Arqiva Chalfont Grove (2006–2013); Pinewood Studios (2013–16)
- Running time: 10–60 minutes
- Production companies: Endemol (2006–2014); Princess Productions (2014–2016); ITN Productions (2016–present)

Original release
- Network: BBC One (1994–2016); BBC iPlayer (2017); Facebook Live (2017–); YouTube (2016–); ITV (2018–)
- Release: 19 November 1994 – present

The National Lottery Results (previously The National Lottery Live, The National Lottery Draw, The National Lottery Stars and The National Lottery Draws) is the television programme that broadcasts the drawing of the National Lottery in the United Kingdom.

== History ==
The programme launched on 19 November 1994 on BBC One, and was initially broadcast live on Saturday nights, before expanding to Wednesday nights in 1997 and Friday nights in 2008. From January 2013 to December 2016, the programme aired only on Saturday nights. Since January 2017, the live draws are no longer broadcast on television and are available to watch online at the National Lottery website and on YouTube.

Since April 2018, a new show called The National Lottery Lotto Results has aired on ITV on Wednesday and Saturday nights during commercial breaks. Presented by Stephen Mulhern, the show features that night's winning Lotto numbers, and spotlights a National Lottery‍–‍funded location. The actual Lotto draw itself is not broadcast, and remains online.

== Presenters ==
The first show was presented by Noel Edmonds. Afterwards, it was co-presented by Anthea Turner and Gordon Kennedy, later replaced by Bob Monkhouse, all of them assisted by the psychic Mystic Meg and numbers expert Sam Weren. When Kennedy left, Anthea Turner remained as solo host and was later followed by a number of other presenters.

Commentary on the draws has, since 1995, been provided by Alan Dedicoat, who earned the nickname The Voice of the Balls. During the live show era, in the event of Dedicoat being unavailable, commentary was provided by fellow BBC Radio 2 announcer Charles Nove.

- Richard Madeley
- John Cleese
- Jane Moore
- Kaye Adams
- Dale Winton
- Gaby Roslin (2014–16)
- Kate Garraway (2014–16)
- Ore Oduba (2015–16)
- Sonali Shah (2015–16)
- Connie Fisher
- Anthea Turner (1994–96, 1997-98)
- Gordon Kennedy (1994–95)
- Bob Monkhouse (1996–98)
- Noel Edmonds (First show, 1994)
- Ulrika Jonsson
- Carol Smillie (1996-99)
- Bruce Forsyth
- Terry Wogan (1997-98)
- John Partridge
- Brian Conley (1999, 2007)
- Jenni Falconer (2006–2015)
- OJ Borg (2009–2013)
- Duncan James (2006–2008)
- Kirsty Gallacher (2007–2009)
- Gethin Jones (2008–2010)
- Christopher Biggins (2009)
- Myleene Klass (2006–2013)
- Scott Mills (2007–2013)
- Christine Bleakley (2009)
- Matt Johnson (2012–13)
- Chris Evans (2013)

=== Draw masters ===
- Paul Van Den Bosch
- Matthew Chamberlain
- Dean Fox
- Jeff Brewin
- Julie Hamilton
- John Willen
- Martin McClure
- Mick Lawes
- Paul Cartwright
- Louise Walters
- Darren Kel

=== Stand-in presenters ===
- Gigi Morley (2002-2004)
- Carol Machin
- John Barrowman
- James McCourt
- Sarah Cawood
- Michael Ball (2007)
- Jenny Powell (2010)
- Bradley Walsh (2007)
- Tim Vincent (2007)
- Tim Lovejoy (2009)
- Lisa Snowdon (2011)

== Show formats ==
=== Saturday night draws ===
From 1998 to 2016, the Saturday night draws were usually presented as part of a game show that was shown to be associated with the lottery branding. Most of the game shows were partially pre-recorded and live in the case with Winning Lines and Jet Set where the first two rounds were pre-recorded but the final round was broadcast live, with the game show host also presenting the lottery draws, though since 18 May 2002, there would also be a draw presenter. Since 23 September 2006, the live lottery draws included as a separate segment with a different presenter. The draws on Saturday night consisted of "Thunderball" followed by "Lotto" a few minutes later, though in the past "Lotto Extra" and its replacement "Dream Number" would also be shown too; both now retired draws. Since 2014, "Lotto Raffle" is no longer featured during the draws. These gameshows usually aired at about 8.00pm, meaning the draw was a lot earlier than when there is no gameshows, when the draw was around 10.00pm. A new gameshow has been released every year, except 2010, 2012, and 2016.

Gaby Roslin hosted the final live draw on 31 December 2016, with Alan Dedicoat joining her in vision to close the show. From 7 January 2017, with the move to the BBC iPlayer, the programme featured no presenter with Dedicoat continuing to announce the draws using pre-recorded commentary. This lasted until April 2017.

=== Lottery update ===
On BBC One on Saturday nights straight after the BBC Weekend News (previously Match of the Day), a segment known as Lottery update was broadcast showing the results of the day's Lotto and Thunderball draws and also how many winners there are. It was also broadcast on BBC One on weeknights after the local news opt-out whenever there were lottery draws taking place, such as the midweek Lotto and Thunderball draws and the Tuesday and Friday EuroMillions and UK Millionaire Raffle draws. This was discontinued at the end of February 2020, bringing to an end the BBC's association with the draw. Since 2020, only the Saturday night Lotto draw results are broadcast on ITV during a commercial break.

=== Wednesday night draws ===
A new midweek National Lottery Draw was introduced and aired on BBC1 from 5 February 1997 to 26 December 2012. From 2 January 2013, the Wednesday draws are available to watch exclusively on the National Lottery's website.

Wednesday night presenters

- Bradley Walsh (2007–2008)
- Michael Ball (2006–2007, 2009)
- Jenni Falconer (2006–2008, 2010–2012)
- Duncan James (2007–2008)
- Scott Mills (2007–2012)
- Kirsty Gallacher (2007)
- Tim Vincent (2008)
- Gethin Jones (2008–2010)
- Myleene Klass (2008–2012)
- Jamelia (2008–2009)
- Jodie Prenger (2009–2011)
- OJ Borg (2009–2012)
- Debra Stephenson (2010)
- Melinda Messenger (2010)

=== Friday night draws ===
The Friday night draws showed the EuroMillions results and the Thunderball draw and are usually broadcast at 23:15. The Friday night draws were the only draws not to be broadcast live. From January 2013, the Friday draws are available to watch exclusively on the National Lottery's website. There is still a results update on BBC One at 22:35.

Friday night presenters

- Sarah Cawood (2008–2009)
- Carole Machin (2008–2010)
- Tim Vincent (2008–2009)
- Myleene Klass (2010–2011)
- OJ Borg (2010–2012)
- Debra Stephenson (2010)
- Gethin Jones (2010)
- Jenni Falconer (2011)
- Scott Mills (2012)
- Matt Johnson (2012)

=== Saturday night game shows ===
Between 1998 and when the televised draws were decommissioned at the end of 2016, eighteen National Lottery game shows had aired. Who Dares Wins, hosted by Nick Knowles, continued to air until 2019, but without the National Lottery branding.

The National Lottery 10th Birthday Celebration, which aired on 6 November 2004 was the only National Lottery gameshow to feature celebrity contestants who played for money to their chosen charities. The show featured six celebrities playing the first round on Wright Around the World, the remaining five playing the "In The Red" round of Jet Set, the remaining three raising money in winner's row on In It to Win It, and the celebrity who raised the most money on In It To Win It playing the Wonderwall round on Winning Lines, hosted by their relevant hosts Ian Wright, Eamonn Holmes, Dale Winton and Phillip Schofield.

Show	Start date	End date	Series	Presenter(s)
Big Ticket	28 March 1998	11 July 1998	1	Patrick Kielty and Anthea Turner
We've Got Your Number	27 February 1999	22 May 1999	1	Brian Conley
Winning Lines	12 June 1999	16 October 2004	6	Simon Mayo (1999–2000); Phillip Schofield (2001–04)
Red Alert	13 November 1999	8 April 2000	2	Lulu & Terry Alderton
On the Spot	29 July 2000	2 September 2000	1	Des O'Connor
Jet Set	20 January 2001	8 August 2007	8	Eamonn Holmes
In It to Win It	18 May 2002	16 July 2016	18	Dale Winton
Wright Around the World	25 October 2003	8 January 2005	2	Ian Wright
Come and Have a Go If You Think You're Smart Enough	3 April 2004	25 June 2005	2	Nicky Campbell (2004); Julian Clary (2005)
The National Lottery 10th Birthday Celebration	6 November 2004		1	Eamonn Holmes; Phillip Schofield; Dale Winton; Ian Wright
Millionaire Manor	3 December 2005	4 March 2006	1	Mark Durden-Smith
1 vs. 100	30 September 2006	23 May 2009	4	Dermot O'Leary (2006–07); Ben Shephard (2008–09)
The People's Quiz	24 March 2007	23 June 2007	1	Jamie Theakston
Who Dares Wins!	17 November 2007	7 September 2019	12	Nick Knowles
This Time Tomorrow	5 July 2008	23 August 2008	1	Tess Daly
Guesstimation	11 July 2009	29 August 2009	1	Nick Knowles
Secret Fortune	12 February 2011	29 December 2012	3	Nick Knowles
Break the Safe	27 July 2013	30 August 2014	2	Nick Knowles
Win Your Wish List	27 December 2014	7 May 2016	2	Shane Richie
5-Star Family Reunion	25 July 2015	15 October 2016	2	Nick Knowles

=== National Lottery Stars ===
National Lottery Stars were held each year and aired on BBC One between 2010 and 2019. Until 2015, the ceremony's name was The National Lottery Awards.

==== Presenters ====
- John Barrowman (2010, 2012–16)
- Myleene Klass (2011)
- Ore Oduba (2017–2019)

== Studios ==
The National Lottery draws were originally filmed at BBC Television Centre in London. From 2006 to 2013, it was filmed at Arqiva Chalfont Grove studios in Chalfont St Peter, Buckinghamshire in a set known as Lottery HQ. From January 2013, it has been filmed from Pinewood Studios. The EuroMillions draw takes place in a dedicated studio in Paris, France. The draw is occasionally shown at other locations for special events such as The National Lottery Awards ceremony.

== Broadcasting ==
Until 2017, the programme was usually broadcast on BBC One, although it was occasionally shown on BBC Two if BBC One was unable to show it. The BBC were granted the rights in 1994 after defeating a rival bid from ITV. The programme was also broadcast on BBC Radio 1 (or Radio 1 FM as it was then known) but once the Wednesday draw was introduced it was broadcast on BBC Radio 5 Live instead. For the first few years of the lottery's existence, the results were also reported on ITV after the draw had taken place, either by an ITN presenter relaying the results of the draw, or overlaid over regular programming at the bottom of the screen.

== Youtube ==
"The National Lottery" also has a youtube channel on which they show various video footage about some of the projects that the Lottery has been involved with, entitled "Because of You", these are Presented by Claudia Winkleman. Most of the regular Lottery Draws are streamed Live on The Lottery's Youtube Channel.
