= On the Spot (British game show) =

- Genre: Game show
- Presented by: Des O'Connor
- Country of origin: United Kingdom
- Original language: English
- No. of series: 1
- No. of episodes: 6

Production
- Running time: 30 minutes

Original release
- Network: BBC One
- Release: 29 July – 2 September 2000

Related
- The National Lottery Draws

On the Spot is a BBC National Lottery game show broadcast on BBC One from 29 July to 2 September 2000. It was hosted by Des O'Connor.

== Ratings ==
Episode no.	Airdate	Viewers (millions)	BBC One weekly ranking
1	29 July 2000	6.64	11
2	5 August 2000	5.72	20
3	12 August 2000	5.58	24
4	19 August 2000	6.27	16
5	26 August 2000	5.39	26
6	2 September 2000	5.50	22
