= The Other Half (game show) =

- Genre: Dating game show
- Created by: Jeremy Lloyd
- Presented by: Dale Winton
- Theme music composer: Ernie Dunstall (1997-99); Tony Royden (2000-02)
- Country of origin: United Kingdom
- Original language: English
- No. of series: 4
- No. of episodes: 31 (inc. 6 specials)

Production
- Running time: 40 minutes

Original release
- Network: BBC One
- Release: 7 June 1997 – 2 February 2002

The Other Half is a dating game show on BBC One, which ran from 7 June 1997 to 2 February 2002. It was hosted by Dale Winton.

== Transmissions ==
=== Series ===
Series	Start date	End date	Episodes
1	7 June 1997	12 July 1997	6
2	18 July 1998	29 August 1998	6
3	5 June 1999	21 August 1999	12
4	8 July 2000	19 August 2000	7

=== Celebrity specials ===
Date	Celebrities
27 December 1999	Wendy Richard, Adam Woodyatt, Kriss Akabusi, Paul Ross, Jenny Powell, Sherrie Hewson
1 July 2000	Jane McDonald, Joe Pasquale, Chris Eubank, Cheryl Baker, Faye Tozer, Lee Latchford Evans
30 December 2000	Linda Robson, Bradley Walsh, Shaun Williamson, Anna Ryder-Richardson, Andy Kane, Sally Gunnell
11 August 2001	Esther Rantzen, Dominic Holland, Arabella Weir, Marcus Brigstocke, Nigel Benn, Lowri Turner
18 August 2001	Paul Daniels, Debbie McGee, Nina Wadia, Ed Byrne, Tony Blackburn, Sarah White
2 February 2002	Linford Christie, Gaynor Faye, Jennie Bond, Rowland Rivron, Tim Vincent, Natalie Cassidy
