= Jet Set (game show) =

- Genre: Game show
- Created by: David Young
- Presented by: Eamonn Holmes
- Composer: Myers Maggs Music
- Country of origin: United Kingdom
- Original language: English
- No. of series: 8
- No. of episodes: 138 + 1 unaired

Production
- Running time: 35 minutes (Series 1-7); 30 minutes (Series 8); 15 minutes (Departure Lounge 2001-02)

Original release
- Network: BBC One
- Release: 20 January 2001 – 8 August 2007

Related
- The National Lottery Draws

Jet Set (also known as The National Lottery: Jet Set) is a BBC National Lottery game show which was broadcast on BBC One from 20 January 2001 to 8 August 2007. It was hosted by Eamonn Holmes.

== Format ==
Six studio contestants compete against one another for a chance to face off against the previous week's champion, with a week's luxury holiday for two at stake.

=== Round One: In the Red ===
Each contestant in turn is given a category and must decide whether to play it or pass to an opponent. A question is then asked; a contestant who answers incorrectly, or who passes to an opponent who answers correctly, is put "in the red." Only one contestant can be in the red at any given time; this contestant is skipped in the order of play, but can have questions passed to them.

This round is played four times, lasting approximately 60 seconds per playing. When time runs out, the contestant in the red is eliminated from play. Any question that is started when time runs out is then finished and can be answered. Following the end of this round, the Thunderball draw takes place.

=== Round Two: Play or Pass ===
Each of the two remaining contestants in turn is given a category and may either play it or pass to the opponent. A correct answer scores one point, while a miss awards the point to the opponent. The first contestant to score four points advances to the final, after which the National Lottery and Lottery Extra draws are held.

In series 1, a buzzer question about the location visited by the previous week's winner was asked to determine initial control. From series 2, the contestant who had been in the red fewer times during round 1 had control. If the contestants were tied in this respect, control went to the one who was the second to go in the red during round 1.

=== Round Three: The Final ===
This round takes place live, and beforehand, both the remaining studio contestant and the previous week's champion (playing via satellite from their latest vacation site) don blindfolds and headphones, so that they cannot see or hear the numbers drawn in the Lotto draw (or those drawn in the Dream Number draw in Jet Set 2012). They are then shown the first number, and the studio contestant must guess whether the next number was higher or lower. A correct guess allows them to select a category from a list of six, while a miss allows the champion to select instead. The studio contestant is then asked a question in that category, scoring one point for a correct answer or awarding one to the champion for a miss.

Control alternates between the two participants, with the one in control making the high/low guess based on the last revealed number and then answering a question. The first to score three points wins the holiday and takes/keeps the championship. If the studio contestant loses in this round, they are invited back to compete again on the following week's episode. In the first few series, if the defending champion loses and has to return home, they and their travelling companion are invited to appear on the following week's episode to start both the Lotto and Lotto Extra draws. The numbers for the Lotto were not used for the final round on just one occasion.

== Jet Set 2012 ==
Jet Set returned to BBC One on 20 June 2007 under the new name of Jet Set 2012, with all the destinations being previous Olympic venues (since London would be hosting the 2012 Summer Olympics). This was announced by Eamonn Holmes on the Midweek Draws with Scott Mills on 16 May 2007. It was filmed at BBC Scotland's Queen Margaret Drive studio in Glasgow, and saw the show move to Wednesday nights in the process. Each episode featured the National Lottery Dream Number taking place live from Lottery HQ, and its results formed part of the end game where the contestants made the high, low or same number guesses to gain control of choosing a subject. The Thunderball and Lotto draws took place in a separate live broadcast later in the evening during this series.

== Notable incidents ==
On 20 May 2006, the programme was invaded by protestors from the campaign group Fathers 4 Justice, moments before the Lotto draw was due to take place. This resulted in the programme being forced off-air for several minutes, whilst the protestors were removed from the studio by security staff. With that night's Eurovision Song Contest just minutes away from starting, the programme quickly rushed through both the Lotto and Lotto Extra draws to avoid being cut off.

== Jet Set Departure Lounge ==
The second series of Jet Set had a Wednesday night quickfire lottery filler called Departure Lounge where nine contestants lined up to answer questions on the buzzer. First to buzz in and answer correctly got a point and the chance to choose the next category from the six on the board. The first six people (or five had the defending champion continued his or her winning journey) to get three correct answers went through to play for the Jet Set on Saturday's show.

== Transmissions ==
Series	Start date	End date	Episodes
1	20 January 2001	21 April 2001	14
2	1 December 2001	11 May 2002	24
2	5 December 2001	8 May 2002	22
3	9 November 2002	8 March 2003	18
4	20 December 2003	24 April 2004	19
5	15 January 2005	16 April 2005	14
6	22 October 2005	26 November 2005	6
7	11 March 2006	17 June 2006	14
8	20 June 2007	8 August 2007	8

- The transmission of Episode 18 of Series 2 was affected by the death of Queen Elizabeth the Queen Mother on 30 March 2002, and failed to broadcast on BBC One as scheduled.
