= Hello Campers =

- Genre: Reality
- Created by: Claire Satchwell; Liz Gaskell
- Voices of: Rosalind Ayres
- Theme music composer: DWH
- Country of origin: United Kingdom
- Original language: English
- No. of series: 1
- No. of episodes: 30

Production
- Running time: 60 minutes (inc. adverts)
- Production company: 12 Yard

Original release
- Network: ITV
- Release: 27 July – 4 September 2015

Hello Campers is a British reality show that has aired on ITV since 27 July 2015 and is narrated by Rosalind Ayres.

== Background ==
Hello Campers aired as a 4:00pm summer replacement for Tipping Point and is produced by 12 Yard; another production of theirs, Guess This House, premiered the same day a few hours earlier. The show was originally commissioned for thirty episodes, and is produced by Matt Walton and Ben Stevens. It was commissioned by Helen Warner, executive produced by James Lessell and is narrated by Rosalind Ayres.

== Format ==
The show consists of five teams of two who go out to a European campsite. Whilst there, they compete in assorted challenges. One team cooks, one team provides entertainment and the other three participate in a local challenge, such as paella-making, flamenco dancing, sculpture or streetdance; the former teams are given points by the other teams, and the other three are given points out of ten by the provider of the local challenge, for example a treasure hunt firm. The team that score the lowest each day has to clean the camp, and the team that scores the highest across the week win £1,000.

== Reception ==
The show has been described as "a cross between Come Dine with Me and Coach Trip".

Hello Campers attracted modest viewership during its 2015 broadcast, with the final episode on September 4 drawing approximately 1.3 million viewers, according to Digital Spy's ratings thread.
