= Gethin Jones =

Welsh television presenter (born 1978)

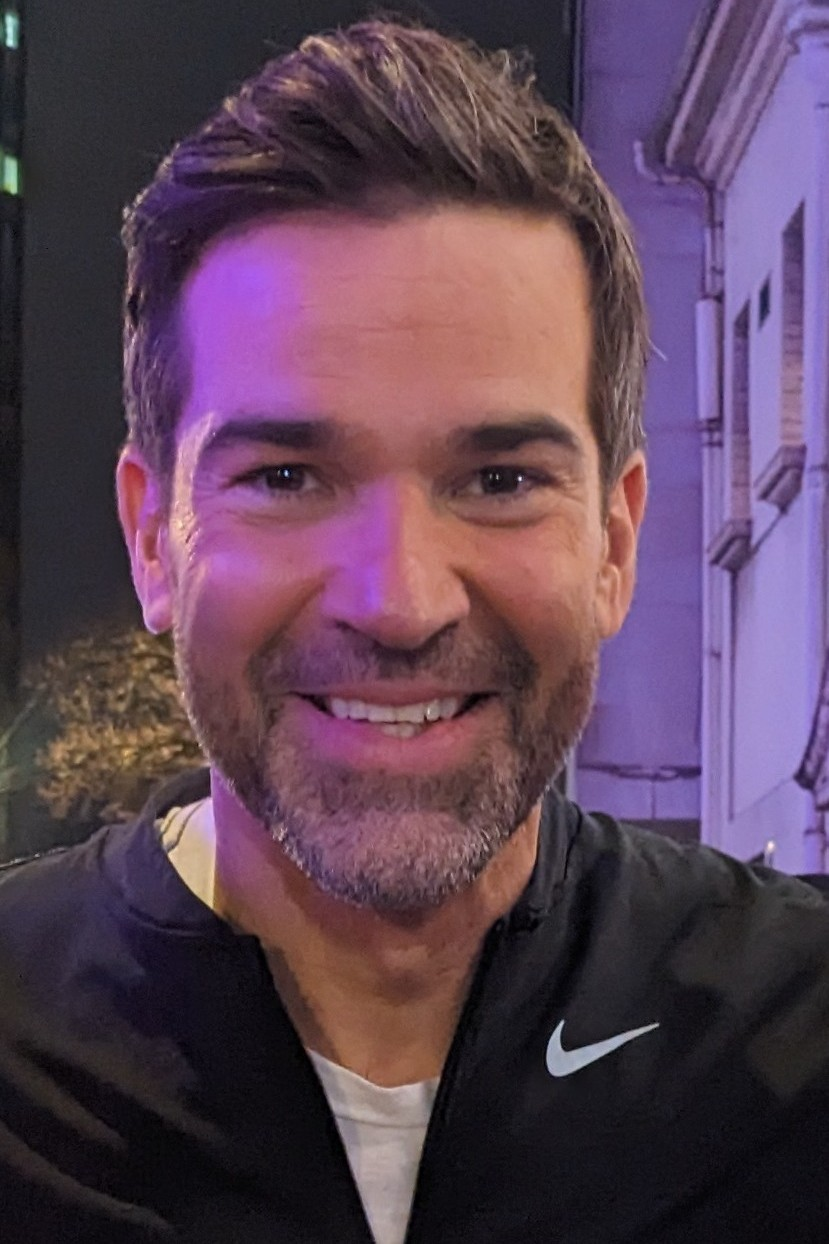
- Jones in 2024
- Born: Gethin Clifford Jones; 12 February 1978 (age 48); Cardiff, Wales
- Occupation: Television presenter
- Years active: 1990s–present
- Television: Uned 5 (2002–2005); Blue Peter (2005–2008); Remembrance Week (2010–present); Morning Live (2020 –present); 71 Degrees North (2010); Daybreak (2011–2014); Holding Out for a Hero (2011)
- Partners: Katherine Jenkins (2007–2011)
- Website: Official website

Gethin Clifford Jones (born 12 February 1978) is a Welsh television presenter. He was an active rugby union player while at Manchester Metropolitan University and, after graduation, he began his television career on Welsh language channel S4C as a presenter of children's programmes such as Popty, Mas Draw and the flagship children's entertainment show Uned 5 (Unit 5, 2002–2005).

In 2005, Jones became the 31st presenter of BBC children's programme Blue Peter. In 2020, he began presenting the BBC1 five-mornings-a-week magazine show Morning Live, broadcast from studios in Manchester. After a trial run ending in December 2020, the success of the programme has seen it commissioned as an all-year-round part of the BBC1 schedule.

== Early life and education ==
Jones was born on 12 February 1978 in Cardiff, the son of Sylvia (née Groskop), a violin teacher, and Goronwy Jones, headteacher of Baden Powell Primary School. He has an older sister, Mererid. One of his maternal great-grandfathers was a Polish-Jewish immigrant. With Welsh as his first language, he attended Ysgol Gynradd Coed-y-Gof and Ysgol Gyfun Gymraeg Glantaf (in Llandaff North, Cardiff) for his primary and secondary school education, respectively. Jones has Grade 8 violin and Grade 6 piano qualifications, and took part in school musicals and school and county orchestras. He took Biology, Geography and Economics at A-Levels.

Jones had dual interests throughout school. His mother wanted him to develop his musical talents, while he enjoyed rugby union. While studying Economics and Geography at Manchester Metropolitan University where he gained a 2:2, he was captain of the university's rugby first team and played in the Lancashire under-21 team. At the age of 21 in his final year, Jones was offered trials by Sale RFC. However, he was not good enough, and he eventually set aside his plans for a professional rugby career.

== Professional career ==
Prior to his television career, Jones worked as a bank clerk, a telephone hotline officer and as a research assistant and spent three months as a builder laying house foundations. He subsequently joined Welsh channel S4C as a presenter of children's programmes such as Popty (the Welsh equivalent of Top of the Pops), Mas Draw, and the flagship children's entertainment show Uned 5 (2002–05). In 2004, as part of a challenge on the show, he learned how to fly a plane and gained his pilot's licence.

In 2003, Jones was voted Bachelor of the Year by the readers of Company magazine.

=== Blue Peter ===
On 26 April 2005, Jones became a presenter of the children's television series, Blue Peter. He auditioned on the same day as co-presenter Zöe Salmon. During his time, Jones presented the show with Salmon, Konnie Huq, Matt Baker, Liz Barker and Andy Akinwolere. As a presenter, he took on the action/adventure role filled by John Noakes and Peter Duncan in the past; highlights included flying with the Red Arrows and in a World War II Supermarine Spitfire, completing submarine escape training with the Royal Navy, surviving the Bolivian jungle, being attacked by an alligator in Louisiana, learning to race like a jockey, and fighting as a samurai warrior in Japan.

In 2006, Jones became the second civilian to finish the Royal Marine Commando 30-mile (48 km) Yomp – he finished in a time of eight hours and 20 minutes. He also played the violin at the Proms with the BBC Philharmonic.

On 12 February 2008, on his 30th birthday, Jones and his Blue Peter co-presenters climbed the highest peaks in each constituent country of the United Kingdom, starting with Slieve Donard in Northern Ireland, followed by Snowdon in north Wales. The following day, having travelled overnight by coach to the Lake District, they climbed Scafell Pike. They were then to be transported to Scotland by helicopter to climb Ben Nevis, but were unable to do so because of problems with the helicopter, forcing them to land in Oban. They succeeded in climbing the mountain the next day. This challenge was in aid of Sport Relief 2008.

Jones announced on 8 April 2008 on Blue Peter that after three and half years with the show, he would be leaving at the end of the current series in June. His spokeswoman said he had always planned to leave when he turned 30. Jones said, "I've had a career on Blue Peter that you wouldn't even dream about and for that I feel privileged and fortunate. ... I've loved it, lived it ... and now I feel the time is right to leave it."

=== Presenter ===
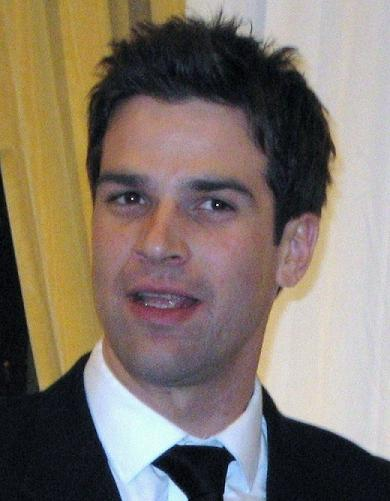
Jones presenting at a charity ball on 21 March 2008 in Bristol, England

Jones has been a presenter for a number of major live telecasts, including Mardi Gras in Cardiff in front of 40,000 people, Y Briodas Fawr (The Big Wedding, 2004–2005), and Jones Jones Jones (2006) at Cardiff's Wales Millennium Centre where the world record was broken for the biggest gathering of people with the same surname. He co-presented the 2006, 2007 and 2008 New Year's Eve programme New Year Live on BBC One with various other presenters.

On 16 February 2008, Jones began presenting a new 15-minute programme entitled E24 on BBC News with James Dagwell. Between 4 and 11 May 2008, Jones was the narrator and presenter of the 2008 BBC Young Musician of the Year. The biennial music competition was held at the Millennium Centre in Cardiff, and broadcast on BBC Two and BBC Four.

Jones made his radio debut on BBC Radio 5 Live on 5 July 2008, presenting a three-hour Saturday morning show focusing on sport and entertainment.

Jones appeared in The National Lottery: Big 7, a live programme broadcast on BBC One on 30 August 2008 where the winners of the National Lottery Awards 2008 were announced.

Jones was one of the players for the Rest of the World for Soccer Aid on 7 September 2008 on ITV. England won four goals to three. Jones was again chosen to play for the Rest of the World in the Soccer Aid match on 7 June 2010. The team won 7 goals to 6 after a penalty shoot out.

On 13 September 2008, Jones presented the Proms in the Park from Singleton Park in Swansea on the BBC as part of the Last Night of the Proms programme and was one of the concerts available for viewers with interactive television.

For six weeks from 28 September, Jones presented a programme for Virgin 1 entitled Gethin Jones' Danger Hunters, which featured adrenaline junkies and their search for the ultimate thrill. Jones presented a Police Camera Action! programme about the dangers of drink driving, which was aired on 17 December 2008 on ITV1.

==== 2009–2011 ====
Between 5 January and 15 April 2009, Jones hosted his first quiz show, a Welsh language rugby-themed general knowledge competition, on S4C entitled Cwis Meddiant. He followed this up with another quiz show on Sky1 called Sell Me the Answer. Filming of the 50 episodes took place at the Fountain Studios in Wembley, North London, and the programme began airing in November 2009. From 17 to 21 August 2009, Jones presented BBC One's The One Show with Gloria Hunniford filling in for Adrian Chiles and Christine Bleakley.

In 2010, Jones presented the Golden Globes programme from the red carpet in Los Angeles on Sunday 17 January 2010 with Angela Griffin and a studio show in the UK was hosted by Claudia Winkleman. The programme was broadcast on Sky1 Movies and Sky1 Movies HD, with a résumé on Sky1 at 11 pm. On 12 February 2010, Jones was a guest on the Welsh S4C chat show Jonathan presented by Jonathan Davies. In 2010, Jones co-hosted ITV's 71 Degrees North with Kate Thornton, which saw celebrities performing various tasks in the extreme weather conditions of Norway.

In February 2011, Jones was a guest presenter on This Morning with Gloria Hunniford. In the autumn of 2011, Jones presented ITV gameshow Holding Out For a Hero. He also hosted Remembrance Week on BBC One that November. From 19 to 23 December, Gethin was a guest features reporter for the ITV Breakfast programme Daybreak.

==== 2012–present ====
Jones and Louise Minchin presented the documentary series Crime and Punishment, which aired on BBC One on 12 March 2012. On 21 May 2012, Jones joined ITV's Daybreak full-time as a reporter. He left with the end of the show in late April 2014.

In August 2014, Jones hosted the ten-part daytime ITV quiz show, The 21st Question.

On 8 May 2016, Jones began co-presenting Sunday Morning Breakfast from 9 am to 12 noon over the summer with Caroline Flack across the Heart Network. He has been a reporter for Strictly Come Dancing: It Takes Two since 2016, and guest presented two episodes on 15 and 16 November 2017, standing in for Zoe Ball.

He took part in the 2016 Christmas special of Strictly Come Dancing on BBC One, partnered with Chloe Hewitt.

He presented the Hits Radio breakfast show alongside Gemma Atkinson and Comedy Dave until 2019.

In the autumn of 2020, Jones began presenting the daily morning magazine show Morning Live on BBC1, alongside Kym Marsh. The series ended on 18 December 2020 and the BBC confirmed on 17 December it would return in 2021 for a second series. This proved highly successful, earning larger audiences than the show's competition on ITV and thus has been commissioned to be an all-year-round, five-mornings-a-week format for BBC1 from the third series on.

=== Other work ===
Jones appeared as a Cyberman in a 2006 episode of Doctor Who and as a Dalek operator in the final episode in 2008. He guest-starred as himself in The Sarah Jane Adventures pilot "Invasion of the Bane" (2007).

In 2007, Jones participated in Series 5 of Strictly Come Dancing, partnering Camilla Dallerup. He came third after being voted out in a "dance-off" in the semi-final. He also appeared in the programme's Christmas Special, finishing second behind Darren Gough after each couple received a perfect score.

Jones was one of the celebrities who took part in the Strictly Come Dancing: The Live Tour! 2009. As his partner from the television show, Camilla Dallerup was dancing with Tom Chambers, Jones partnered Flavia Cacace. The tour began in Newcastle on 16 January and ended at the National Exhibition Centre in Birmingham on 22 February 2009 with a total of 44 shows. He and his dance partner achieved a total of six wins during the run of the tour.

In December 2009, Jones appeared in the 2009 Strictly Come Dancing Christmas Special along with Rachel Stevens, Ali Bastian, Ricky Whittle, Chris Hollins and Austin Healey. His partner was again Flavia Cacace. The couple were not voted into the final two, despite a score of 38 for their American Smooth. From 4 December 2009 until 10 January 2010, Jones appeared as Prince Charming in the pantomime Cinderella at the Yvonne Arnaud Theatre, Guildford. In September 2010, Jones appeared as the Narrator in The Rocky Horror Show at Venue Cymru, Llandudno.

In 2012 Jones made a cameo appearance as himself in an episode of comedy drama Stella. In May 2012, Jones was an Olympic Torchbearer in the torch relay before the 2012 Summer Olympics. Since August 2012, Jones has been an Ambassador for the Wandsworth series of London Sky Rides.

In 2020, Jones appeared as a contestant on Celebrity Masterchef.

In 2022, he provided presentation in televised coverage of the first visit as king of King Charles III to the Welsh capital on 16 September.

In June 2025, Jones was appointed chef de mission for Team Wales for the Glasgow 2026 Commonwealth Games.

== Filmography ==
=== Television & radio ===
Year	Title	Role
2005–2008	Blue Peter	Co-presenter
2006	Jones Jones Jones	Presenter
2006–2008	New Year Live	Reporter
2007	Strictly Come Dancing	Participant
2008	BAFTA Cymru Awards	Presenter
2008	Young Musician of the Year	Presenter
2008	BBC Radio 5 Live	Presenter
2008	The National Lottery: Big 7	Presenter
2008–2011	Gethin Jones' Danger Hunters	Presenter
2008–2009	BBC Proms in the Park, Wales	Presenter
2008–2009	E24	Presenter
2008–2010	The National Lottery Draws	Presenter
2008, 2010	Police Camera Action!	Presenter
2009	Cwis Meddiant	Presenter
2009	The One Show	Stand-in presenter
2009–2010	Sell Me the Answer	Presenter
2010	Drop Zone	Presenter
2010	71 Degrees North	Co-presenter
2010	Golden Globes: Red Carpet	Co-presenter
2010–	Remembrance Week	Presenter
2011	This Morning	Guest presenter
2011	Holding Out for a Hero	Presenter
2011	The Adventurer's Guide to Britain	Co-presenter
2011–2014	Daybreak	Reporter
2012	Crime and Punishment	Co-presenter
2012	Britain's Secret Treasures	Reporter
2014	The 21st Question	Presenter
2016	Sunday Morning Breakfast (Heart Network)	Co-presenter
2016–	Strictly Come Dancing: It Takes Two	Reporter & guest presenter
2018–2019	Hits Radio Breakfast Show	Co-presenter
2020	Celebrity Masterchef	Contestant
2020–	Morning Live	Co-presenter
2021	A Countryside Christmas	Narrator
2022	The Lord Mayor's Show	Co-presenter
2022–	A Countryside Summer	Narrator
2023	Inside British Airways: 24/7	Narrator

Some of the information in this table was obtained from Gethin Jones: Filmography, Internet Movie Database (IMDb).

=== Actor, cameo or participant ===
Date(s) of appearance	Television programme or series	Role	Notes
2004	Company Bachelor of the Year 2004	Participant	
25 June 2006	Children's Party at the Palace	Julian Kirrin of Enid Blyton's Famous Five	
13–20 May 2006	Doctor Who "Rise of the Cybermen/The Age of Steel"	Cyberman	2 episodes
2007	Strictly Come Dancing	Participant	Came third
2007	Strictly Come Dancing: It Takes Two	Guest	
1 January 2007	The Sarah Jane Adventures "Invasion of the Bane"	Himself, Cameo appearance	1 episode
5 July 2008	Doctor Who "Journey's End"	Dalek	1 episode
7 September 2008	Soccer Aid 2008	Player, Rest of the World team	
16 January – 22 February 2009	Strictly Come Dancing: The Live Tour! 2009	Participant	
25 December 2016	Strictly Come Dancing Christmas Special	Participant	
10–14 February 2020	Richard Osman's House of Games	Participant	
15 June 2024	Celebrity Bridge of Lies	Participant	Alongside Anna Haugh, Dr Ranj Singh & Briony May Williams
17 January 2025	Would I Lie To You?	Participant	

Some of the information in this table was obtained from Gethin Jones: Filmography, Internet Movie Database (IMDb).

== Awards ==
On 5 November 2008, Jones won the title of "Ultimate Hottie" by Cosmopolitan magazine. He has been in contention with other similar competitions.

== Personal life ==
In December 2007, Jones became romantically involved with mezzo-soprano Katherine Jenkins. They first met in 2005. It was reported they met after Jenkins sang "Time to Say Goodbye" with Italian opera singer Andrea Bocelli on an episode of Strictly Come Dancing, broadcast on 21 October 2007. Jenkins's spokesman has said: "They're old friends and they've been on several dates. But people shouldn't consider buying hats just yet."

In February 2011, Jones and Jenkins announced their engagement. However, on 30 December 2011, they both announced that they were going their separate ways.

In 2025, Jones revealed that he had been banned from the online dating app Hinge, after moderators received complaints from over 300 women, who had incorrectly reported him for "catfishing".

Jones is a keen footballer (he supports Everton FC, and hosted a 2009 DVD entitled My Everton), tennis player and golfer. He is short-sighted and wore contact lenses or glasses until he underwent a laser procedure to correct his shortsightedness on 17 June 2009.
