= The Rich List (American game show) =

American television game show

- Genre: Game show
- Created by: Jim Cannon; Andy Culpin; Sam Pollard; David Young
- Directed by: Bob Levy
- Presented by: Eamonn Holmes
- Country of origin: United States
- No. of seasons: 1
- No. of episodes: 1

Production
- Executive producers: David Young; Mike Beale; Andy Culpin
- Production company: 12 Yard

Original release
- Network: Fox
- Release: November 1, 2006

Related
- The Money List

The Rich List is an American television game show on Fox, that aired its only episode on 1 November 2006 at 9 pm ET / PT. The show was then cancelled two days later by Fox after rating poorly in comparison to its slot competitors, Lost (on ABC) and CBS's Criminal Minds. It was produced by the British company 12 Yard, whose main creative team devised and produced Weakest Link and Dog Eat Dog. It featured competitors making lists of things, such as ABBA songs or Steven Spielberg movies, with the winning team being the one that could name the most. British television presenter Eamonn Holmes was the host.

In the episode, Holmes stated, "Our top prize is so big...well, we don't have a top prize!"

Despite its failure, two and a half years later, a revised version aired on GSN under the title The Money List, with Fred Roggin hosting.

== Gameplay ==
Two teams of two players each competed. The teams were placed in separate soundproof isolation booths, with audio that could be turned on or off by the host, much like the Twenty-One game show. He would announce the category for the list, such as "Tom Cruise Movies" or "Top 50 Broadway Shows of All Time", and the teams would take turns bidding on how many they thought they could name.

The host would switch the audio on and off between booths as the bidding continued, then turn them both on when one team dared the other to fulfill the bid. That team would then need to come up with that many correct answers in a row to win the list. One mistake would award it to their opponents.

The first team to win two lists won the game and went on to the bonus round.

=== Tiebreaker ===
If each team won one list, a sudden death tiebreaker was played. The host would give the category, both booths were switched on, and the teams took turns giving one answer at a time. To win the list and the game, one team would have to give a correct answer while their opponents missed.

=== Bonus round (The Rich List/The Money List) ===
The winning team was given a new category by the presenter and had the chance to supply up to 15 right answers. Winnings increased after every third one as shown in the table below.

Right Answers	Winnings (The Rich List)	Winnings (The Money List)
3	$10,000	$5,000
6	$25,000	$10,000
9	$75,000	$15,000
12	$150,000	$25,000
15	$250,000	$50,000

If a wrong answer was given at any time, the team would lose all accumulated money for that bonus round, but previous winnings were safe. After every third answer, they could choose to stop (keeping all money won so far) or go on. Regardless of the outcome, they would have returned to play against a new pair of opponents; only a loss in the main game could have eliminated the champions.

=== Contestants and winnings ===
The Rich List

Number	Contestants	Appearance	Total winnings	No. of Rich Lists played
1	Ray Barnhart & Bill May	November 1, 2006	$175,000	2

The Money List

Number	Contestants	Appearance	Total winnings	No. of Money Lists played
1	Scott Seidler & Harriett Davies	June 13, 2009	$5,000	2
2	Charysse Harper & Mike Wending	June 20, 2009	$25,000	2
3	Darren Heyman & Barbara Stcherbatchef; Young Dawkins & Shannon Dardashti	June 27, 2009	$10,000 $10,000	1; 1
4	Robert Checkoway & Anastasia Travers	July 11, 2009	$50,000	2
5	Robert Checkoway & Anastasia Travers; Brad Serton & Megan Niedermeyer	July 18, 2009	$5,000 $10,000	1; 1
6	Brad Serton & Megan Niedermeyer	July 25, 2009	$15,000	2
7	Lisa Vickers & Bentley Kalu; Courtney Welch & Alisha Zucker	August 1, 2009	$15,000 $0	1; 1
8	Autumn Jenkins & Christopher Slaughter; Karen Steinbach & David Vest	August 8, 2009	$0 $0	1; 1
9	Karen Steinbach & David Vest	August 15, 2009	$10,000	2

== Past lists ==
The Rich List

Episode #	Air Date	Lists
1	November 1, 2006	Tom Cruise movies Books or short stories by Stephen King People Magazine's Sexiest Man Alive Sudden Death Best Picture Oscar winners The Rich List Top 50 Broadway shows America's 50 most read daily newspapers Animated Disney Films theatrically released including Pixar The Rich List

The Money List

Episode #	Air Date	Lists
1	June 13, 2009	Julia Roberts movies Countries of Asia Scrabble letters worth more than one point Sudden Death Dr. Seuss books The Money List America's Top 50 restaurant chains Celebrity guest stars who have appeared as themselves on the TV series Will & Grace The Beatles Billboard US Top 40 Hits The Money List
2	June 20, 2009	Elvis Presley's Billboard US Top 40 Hits Hotels with Casinos on the Las Vegas Strip Looney Tunes "Looney Stars" cartoon characters Sudden Death Presidents of the USA before 1900 The Money List Adam Sandler movies 100 most populated cities in the world Countries that have held the Miss Universe title 1952-2008 Sudden Death Winners of the Tony Award for Best Musical 1949-2008 The Money List
3	June 27, 2009	Oscar-winning actresses 1927-2008 Properties for sale on a Monopoly board Men who have walked on the Moon Sudden Death The characters and family in the TV series Friends The Money List Elton John's Billboard US Top 40 Hits - including collaborations Host cities of the Summer Olympics 1896-2008 Dustin Hoffman movies The Money List
4	July 11, 2009	Meryl Streep movies Named characters from the book Harry Potter and the Sorcerer's Stone Mariah Carey's Billboard US Top 40 Hits - including collaborations Sudden Death European Capital Cities The Money List The 100 Great Stand-ups of all time Female Grand Slam Tennis singles Champions 1968-2008 Songs from the original film soundtrack of Grease The Money List
5	July 18, 2009	Saturday Night Live male cast members Michael Jackson's Billboard US Top 40 Hits - including collaborations Characters that were voiced in The Simpsons Movie Sudden Death Countries that have a star on their national flag The Money List Best Actor Oscar winners 1927-2008 Top 50 girls names' in USA in 2007 Top 10 largest lakes in the world Sudden Death Clue characters, weapons & locations The Money List
6	July 25, 2009	John Travolta movies Countries that use Spanish as an official language US Vice Presidents The Money List Madonna's Billboard US Top 40 Hits - including collaborations Golfers who have won a Major title, 1960-2008 The 10 Top-Earning deceased celebrities Sudden Death Primetime Emmy Award-Winning TV Comedy Series, 1966-2007 The Money List
7	August 1, 2009	Bruce Willis movies The 30 most populous US cities The Top 25 wine-producing countries in the world The Money List The 101 Top-selling musical artists of all time in the USA The plays of William Shakespeare Portraits on current US Legal Tender Sudden Death Movies directed by Steven Spielberg The Money List
8	August 8, 2009	Eddie Murphy movies Winners of the NFL Super Bowl 1967-2008 The 50 highest-paid celebrities in the world The Money List Currencies of the world Characters, creatures & droids from Star Wars, The Empire Strikes Back and Return of the Jedi The 20 most common surnames in the US Sudden Death Best Female country vocal performance Grammy winners 1964-2008 The Money List
9	August 15, 2009	Whitney Houston's Billboard US Top 40 Hits - including collaborations Commercial airlines that fly in and out of Chicago's O'Hare Airport Time magazine's "Person of the Year" recipients, 1927-2007 The Money List American Idol Finalists 2002-2008 States of the US with an Ocean coastline Musicals composed by Andrew Lloyd Webber Sudden Death Will Smith movies The Money List

== International versions ==
- Fox promos for The Rich List in the weeks leading up to its debut had mentioned that the show was the most addicting game show to come out of the UK since Who Wants to Be a Millionaire?. However, despite being created by a British group, The Rich List had not then been televised in Britain (the US version was first to air). Before the US version was announced, Holmes did host a pilot for ITV, but the show was not picked up. It later aired as a tie-in for the National Lottery on BBC One under the title Who Dares Wins, hosted by Nick Knowles.
- In Australia, Seven Network picked up the rights to the show and announced plans to air a local version before the US version premiered. The program is hosted by Deal or No Deal host Andrew O'Keefe. The pilot episode was taped on 18 October 2006. The show began taping episodes for air on 11 December 2006 and auditions for contestants for the show continue. The money amounts for the final round are the same as on the US show, except in Australian dollars. The show premiered on 29 January 2007.
- In Germany, The Rich List is produced for the German TV channel Sat.1. Kai Pflaume is the host. The format and rules appear to be identical to those on the US and Australian versions, although the prize values for the bonus list are less (the top prize for completing the bonus list is €100,000). The show premiered as a three-night event on 26 May 2007, and will now run Saturdays and Sundays at 7:15 pm.
- In Greece, the local version of The Money List was produced and aired on ANT1. The show has started airing on 7 October 2008 until 2009 and was hosted by Christos Ferentinos.
- In New Zealand, The Rich List is produced for TVNZ and airs on TV ONE. Applications for the show were opened at the beginning of April 2007. The grand prize for completing the bonus list is NZ$50,000. The host is Jason Gunn.
- In North Macedonia, Листа за 300 (List for 300) is produced for Sitel. The show has started airing in April 2019 and the host of the first season was famous Macedonian actor Dejan Lilikj. For the second season there was change of host and Marko Noveski is host of the show. In the first season, the main prize was 300,000 denars (around €5,000), and after it the top prize was decreased to €300.
- In Ireland, The Money List is produced by RTÉ and airs on RTÉ One. The show has started airing on 1 October 2023 and is hosted by Baz Ashmawy. The grand prize for the Irish version is €15,000.

Country	Local name	Host	Channel	Year aired	Top prize per round
Australia	The Rich List	Andrew O'Keefe	Seven Network	2007–2009	$250,000
France	La Liste gagnante	Patrice Laffont	France 3	2009	€5,000
Germany	Rich List – Jede Antwort zählt	Kai Pflaume	Sat.1	2007–2008	€100,000
Greece	H Λίστα; I Lista	Christos Ferentinos	ANT1	2008–2009	Unknown
Ireland	The Money List	Baz Ashmawy	RTÉ One	2023–present	€15,000
New Zealand	The Rich List	Jason Gunn	TV ONE	2007–2008	$50,000
North Macedonia	Листа за 300; Lista za 300	Dejan Lilikj; Marko Noveski	Sitel	2019–present	300,000 denars (first season) €300 (since second season)
Spain	La Lista	Daniel Domenjó	La 1	2008	€25,000
Spain	La Lista	Carlos Sobera	La 2	2010	€25,000
United Kingdom	Who Dares Wins	Nick Knowles	BBC One	2007–2019	£50,000
United States (original format)	The Rich List	Eamonn Holmes	FOX	November 1, 2006	$250,000
United States (original format)	The Money List	Fred Roggin	GSN	2009	$50,000

== Cancellation ==
After only one episode with a 1.5/4 rating (4 million viewers), the show was pulled from its time slot, to be replaced by a special new episode of The O.C. the following week, which struggled the next night during its season premiere. The Rich List became the second US program in the 2006 calendar year (after ABC's Emily's Reasons Why Not in January), and the first of the 2006–07 television season, to be cancelled after a single telecast.

== Revival ==
The Money List
- Genre: Game show
- Created by: Jim Cannon; Andy Culpin; Sam Pollard; David Young
- Presented by: Fred Roggin
- Country of origin: United States
- No. of seasons: 1
- No. of episodes: 9

Production
- Production company: 12 Yard

Original release
- Network: GSN
- Release: June 13 – August 15, 2009

Related
- The Rich List

The show earned a revival for GSN under the title The Money List, and premiered on 13 June 2009. Pilot episodes of the series were taped in London on the set of Who Dares Wins at The London Studios from 27 to 30 August 2008 with sports commentator Fred Roggin as host. The top prize for this version is US $50,000, which is the same top prize amount as the UK and New Zealand versions (the only difference is that the UK's version is in pounds sterling, while New Zealand's version is in New Zealand dollars). The revival ended on 15 August 2009 after one season and nine episodes aired.
