= Without Prejudice? =

British game show

- Genre: Game show
- Presented by: Liza Tarbuck
- Voices of: Kieron Elliott
- Country of origin: United Kingdom
- Original language: English
- No. of series: 2
- No. of episodes: 14

Production
- Running time: 60 minutes (inc. adverts)
- Production company: 12 Yard

Original release
- Network: Channel 4
- Release: 4 January 2003 – 16 April 2004

Without Prejudice? is a British game show that aired on Channel 4 from 4 January 2003 to 16 April 2004 and was hosted by Liza Tarbuck.

== Format ==
The object involves five random people deciding which one of five strangers is worthy of winning money. (UK version: £50,000 in series one, £20,000 in series two)

The decisions are based on the impressions and opinions of each contestant as made by the panelists.

The order goes as follows:

- A 15-second introduction of the contestants is shown to the panel. They then must decide who gets eliminated solely based on who gives off the worst impression.
- A short biography of the contestants is shown, followed by the occupation and annual salary of the contestants. The panel then eliminates a second contestant.
- The three remaining contestants are asked about three "hot button" issues, such as prostitution, same-sex marriage and adoption, or gun control. Then, a hidden camera video is shown with the three contestants interacting with actors whom they believe to be contestants. The third contestant is then eliminated.
- The final two contestants are interviewed by the panel. Any panelist can ask any question, as long as s/he doesn't ask what the winner would do with the money. The panel then votes for a winner.

== Transmissions ==
Series	Start date	End date	Episodes
1	4 January 2003	23 February 2003	8
2	12 March 2004	16 April 2004	6

== United States adaptation ==
Without Prejudice?
- Genre: Reality television
- Directed by: Brad Kreisburg
- Presented by: Robi Ludwig
- Announcer: Craig DeSilva
- Country of origin: United States
- Original language: English

Production
- Executive producers: David Young; Michael Beale; Andrew Culpin
- Running time: 90 minutes
- Production company: 12 Yard

Original release
- Network: GSN
- Release: July 17 – September 16, 2007

A short-lived US version aired from 17 July to 16 September 2007 on GSN and was hosted by psychotherapist Dr. Robi Ludwig. The US version gained notoriety when, on one episode, a contestant claimed he would eliminate another contestant solely because "he's black". Additionally, on 28 August 2007, it was in partnership with the NAACP in order to air the newest PSA spot during a special episode that was presented in association with the organization.
