= Jones Jones Jones =

2006 event and television concert

Logo of Jones Jones Jones

Jones Jones Jones was an event held at the Wales Millennium Centre in Cardiff, Wales on 3 November 2006, which broke the Guinness World Record for the largest gathering of people with the same surname—Jones.

== The event ==
1,224 Joneses attended a gala concert in Cardiff featuring performances by Grace Jones, Dame Gwyneth Jones, John Owen-Jones and Tammy Jones, alongside a host of Welsh-speaking singers, actors and celebrities. During the evening, messages of support were shown from Aled Jones, Bryn Terfel, Stephen Jones, Ruth Jones, Rhys Meirion Jones and well wishes from Tom Jones and Catherine Zeta-Jones. The evening was co-presented by Gethin Jones, Gwenllian Jones and Aled Haydn Jones. Also present on the evening were representatives of the past record holders, the Norbergs from Norberg, Sweden beating their record of 583.

The event was organised by the independent television production company Cwmni Da, events company Mr Producer of Cardiff, and S4C. It was also televised on S4C on 26 November 2006.

As of 31st May 2026 the O'Sullivans and Sullivans are holders of a Guinness World Record for "the largest same name gathering—last name". There were 1,848 O'Sullivans and Sullivans who gathered in Castletownbere, County Cork, Ireland at the time of the count.

This bets the 9 September 2007 record for the Gallaghers who were holders of a Guinness World Record for "the largest same name gathering—last name". There were 1,488 Gallaghers who gathered in the LYIT Campus in Letterkenny, County Donegal, Ireland at the time of the count.
