= Kai Pflaume =

German television presenter and game show host

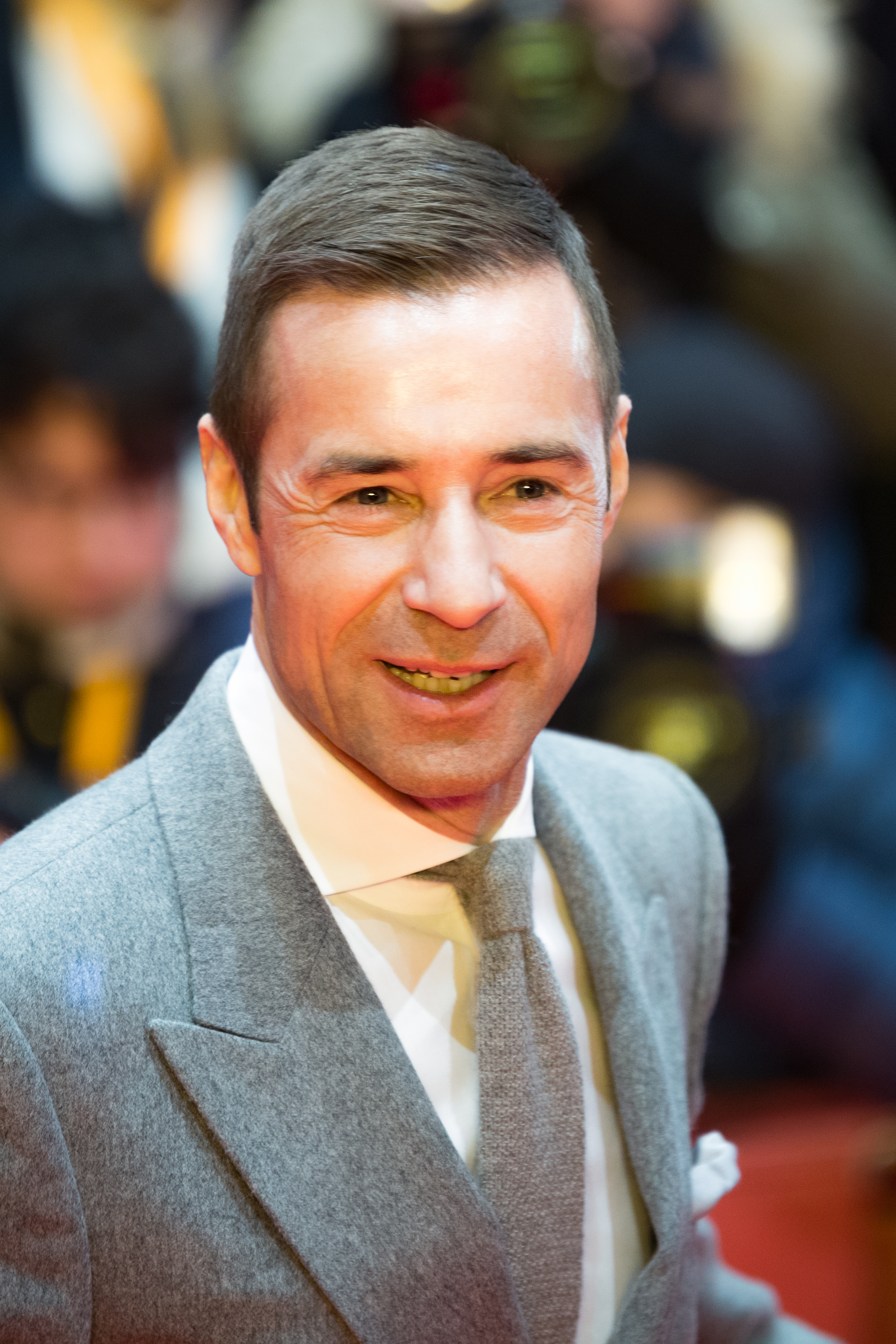
- Pflaume in 2017
- Born: 27 May 1967 (age 59); Halle, Bezirk Halle, East Germany
- Occupations: Television presenter, host
- Years active: 1993–present
- Spouse: Ilke (after 1996)
- Children: 2

Kai Pflaume (born 27 May 1967) is a German television presenter and game show host.

== Biography ==
Pflaume was born in Halle in 1967 and his family moved to Leipzig a year later. After completing his Abitur in 1985, he moved to the island of Rügen to complete his national service for the National People's Army. In 1987, he began graduate studies in Information Studies at the Technical University of Magdeburg.

Pflaume fled East Germany via Budapest to reach the West in 1989 and trained as a securities trader in Frankfurt, when he was invited to take part on an episode of dating show Herzblatt, the German version of The Dating Game, on 4 October 1991.

After his first appearance on TV, he eventually turned to presenting and got his first show on Sat.1 in 1995 in Nur die Liebe zählt, a format that Sat.1 had poached from RTL that year, which he hosted until 2011. From 1996, Pflaume became a regular on the network, hosting shows such as Die Glücksspirale, Rache ist süß, Die Comedy-Falle, Stars am Limit, Die LEGO Show, Träume werden wahr, Deutschland hilft - Spenden für die Opfer der Flutkatastrophe or Die Chance deines Lebens, which later became the inspiration for Deal or No Deal. Pflaume won his first Bambi Award for hosting the German version of Star Search in 2003.

In 2004, Pflaume voiced the character Frozone in the German dub of The Incredibles. Pflaume hosted Sat.1's coverage of the UEFA Cup for the 2006/07 season and hosted the show Rich List from 2007 to 2008.

Pflaume swapped to Das Erste in 2011 and hosted Star Quiz mit Kai Pflaume as his first quiz show on the network. He followed it with Klein gegen Groß - Das unglaubliche Duell. He also hosted a short-lived reboot of Dalli Dalli from 2011 until 2013. Since 2015, he has hosted the show Wer weiß denn sowas? on ARD.

In August 1996, Pflaume married his wife Ilke. The couple has two sons.

== TV filmography ==
- Nur die Liebe zählt
- Die Glücksspirale
- Rache ist süß
- Die Comedy-Falle
- Stars am Limit
- Die LEGO Show
- Träume werden wahr
- Deutschland hilft - Spenden für die Opfer der Flutkatastrophe
- Die Chance deines Lebens
- Rich List
- Das Starquiz mit Kai Pflaume
- Dalli Dalli
- Drei bei Kai
- Der klügste Deutsche 2011
- Wer weiß denn sowas?
- Klein gegen gross

== Awards ==
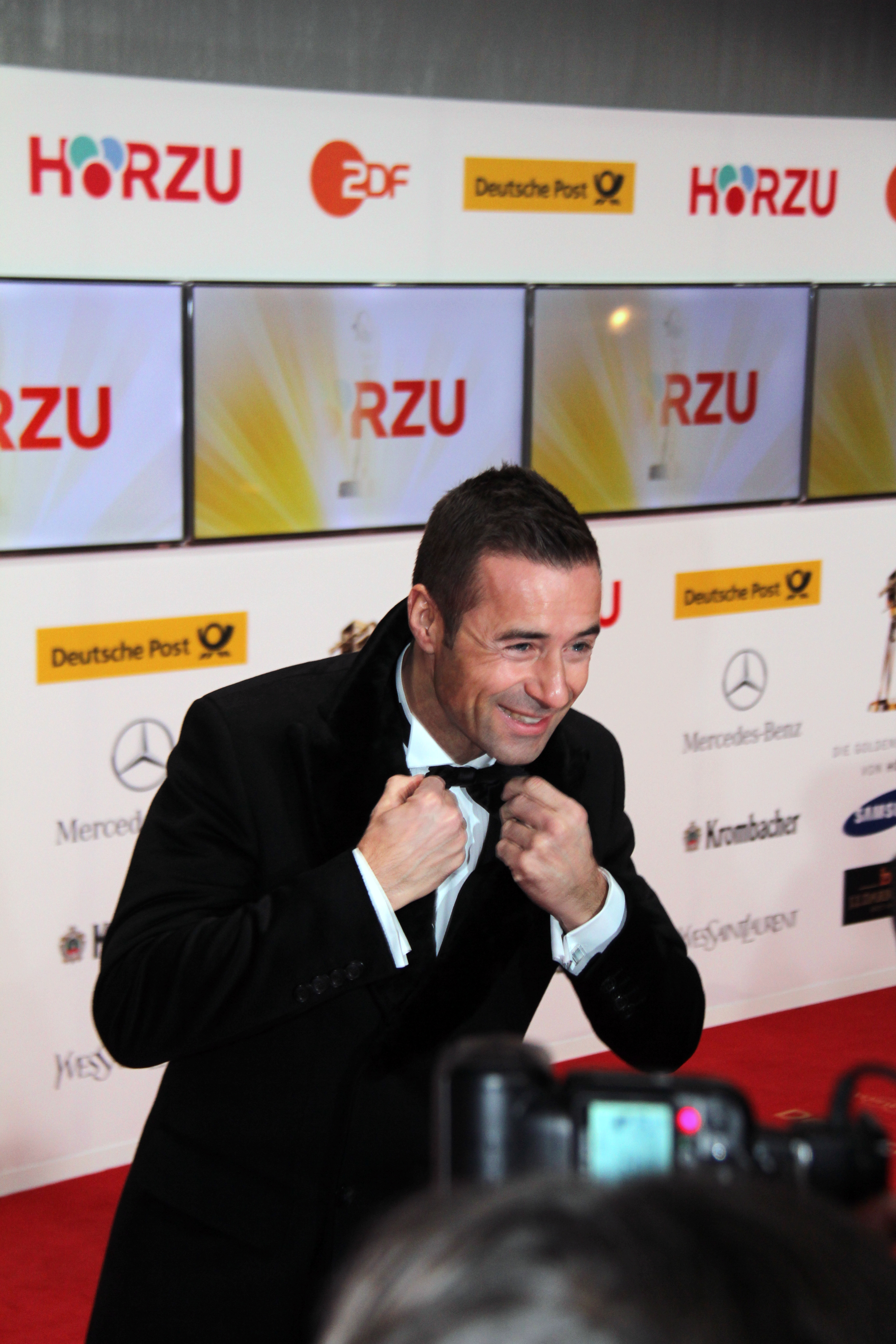
Pflaume at the Goldene Kamera awards 2012

- 1993: Bambi Award
- 2014: Bavarian TV Award
