= 12 Yard =

British television production company

12 Yard Productions Limited
- Trade name: 12 Yard
- Industry: Television
- Genre: Production company
- Founded: 5 April 2001; 25 years ago
- Founder: David Young
- Defunct: November 11, 2025; 12 months ago
- Fate: Closed by ITV, Folded into Bright Entertainment
- Successor: Bright Entertainment
- Headquarters: London, UK
- Owner: ITV plc (2007–2025)
- Parent: Hat Trick 12 Yard Productions Limited (2001–2007); ITV Studios (2007–2025)
- Subsidiaries: 12 Yard Productions (Investments) Limited
- Website: 12yard.com

12 Yard Productions Limited, trading as 12 Yard, was a British television production company that mainly focused on the production of game shows and light entertainment programmes.

12 Yard produced formats including the BBC's long-running quiz Eggheads, Saturday night BBC One lottery formats The National Lottery: In it to Win it and Who Dares Wins!, primetime feel-good format Holding out for a Hero, Take on the Twisters and Big Star's Little Star for ITV, and Coach Trip, Celebrity Coach Trip and Christmas Coach Trip for Channel 4.

== History ==
12 Yard was formed by David Young in 2001 shortly after leaving the BBC's Light Entertainment department, which he previously ran. The company was operated under Hat Trick 12 Yard Productions Limited, a joint venture run by Young, the creative team behind the worldwide hit Weakest Link and Hat Trick Productions.

On 5 December 2007, it was confirmed that ITV plc had acquired 12 Yard for £35 million. The purchase of the company formed as ITV's first acquisition for its ITV Productions division.

On 22 October 2024, ITV Studios announced that it would close the studio at the end of the year, with its IPs and shows being transitioned off to other ITV Studios subsidiaries. In October 2025, ITV announced that 12 Yard and sister label Potato would be folded into a newly-formed label of ITV Studios. The label was launched as Bright Entertainment in January 2026.

Bright Entertainment announced its first commission, The Chase Around the World, in January 2026. The six-part series was produced by the new label and commissioned for ITV.

The company was dissolved in November 2025 while the "Investments" division remains as a dormant company.

== Programmes ==
Title	Year(s)	Network	Notes/Sources
Dirty Money	2002	Sky One	
The National Lottery: In It to Win It	2002–2016	BBC One	
Eggheads	2003–2020, 2021-2023	BBC One (2003–2005); BBC Two (2005–2020); Channel 5 (2021–2023)	
Without Prejudice?	2003–2004	Channel 4	
The Benefactor	2004	ABC	
Coach Trip	2005–2006, 2009–2012, 2014–2019	Channel 4 (2005–2006, 2009–2012, 2014–2015); E4 (2016–2019)	
The Rich List	2006	Fox	
The Great British Village Show	2007	BBC One	
The National Lottery: Who Dares Wins	2007–2019	BBC One	
Are You an Egghead?	2008–2009	BBC Two	Spin-off to Eggheads
Celebrity Eggheads	2008–2013, 2017–2018, 2022–2023	BBC Two (2008–2013, 2017–2018); Channel 5 (2022–2023)	Celebrity spin-off to Eggheads
The Colour of Money	2009	ITV	12 Yard's first commission from an ITV-owned network
Celebrity Coach Trip	2010–2012, 2019–2022	Channel 4 (2010–2012); E4 (2019–2022)	Celebrity spin-off to Coach Trip
Michael Winner's Dining Stars	2010	ITV	
Perfection	2011–2016	BBC Two (2011–2012, 2015); BBC One (2013–2014)	
Holding out for a Hero	2011	ITV	
Sorority Girls	2011	E4	
Christmas Coach Trip	2011	Channel 4	Christmas themed spin-off to Coach Trip
Don't Blow the Inheritance!	2012	ITV	
Top Dog Model	2012	ITV2	
Brendan's Magical Mystery Tour	2013	Channel 4	Spin-off of Coach Trip
Take on the Twisters	2013	ITV	
Big Star's Little Star	2013–2018	ITV	
Pressure Pad	2013–2014	BBC One (2013–2014); BBC Two (2014)	
Revenge of the Egghead	2014	BBC Two	Spin-off to Eggheads
The Guess List	2014	BBC One	
Gift Wrapped	2014	ITV	
Celebrity Pressure Pad	2014	BBC One	Celebrity spin-off to Pressure Pad
The National Lottery: 5-Star Family Reunion	2015–2016	BBC One	Co-production with Boom Cymru
Guess This House	2015	ITV	
Hello, Campers!	2015	ITV	
Big Star's Bigger Star	2015, 2018	ITV	Spin-off of Big Star's Little Star; Originally a one-off show for Text Santa, and commissioned for full series in 2018.
Insert Name Here	2016–2019	BBC Two	Co-production with Black Dog Television
Think Tank	2016	BBC One	
Make Me an Egghead	2016	BBC Two	Spin-off to Eggheads
I'll Get This	2018–2020	BBC Two	
The Instant Gardener	2018–2019	BBC One	
Catchpoint	2019–2022	BBC One	Co-production with Possessed
Comedians Giving Lectures	2019–2022	Dave	
The Cabins	2021–2022	ITV2	
Unbeatable	2021–2023	BBC One	Co-production with Possessed
PopMaster TV	2023–2025	More4	Spin-off of Ken Bruce's radio music quiz of the same name Later seasons will be produced by Bright Entertainment
Puzzling	2023	Channel 5	Co-Production with Wheelhouse; The 2025 revival, Celebrity Puzzling, is co-produced with Potato
Bullseye	2024	ITV	One-off Christmas Special; The full-series revival is produced by Potato (Series 1) and Bright Entertainment (Series 2)

=== Other ===
Title	Year(s)	Network	Notes/Sources
Best Possible Taste: The Kenny Everett Story	2012	BBC Four	TV movie
Cheaters: Unfinished Business	2025-present	Netflix	Originated at 12 Yard, but produced by Lifted Entertainment
