= Cricket World Cup teams =

This is a summary of the performances of various international teams in the Cricket World Cup

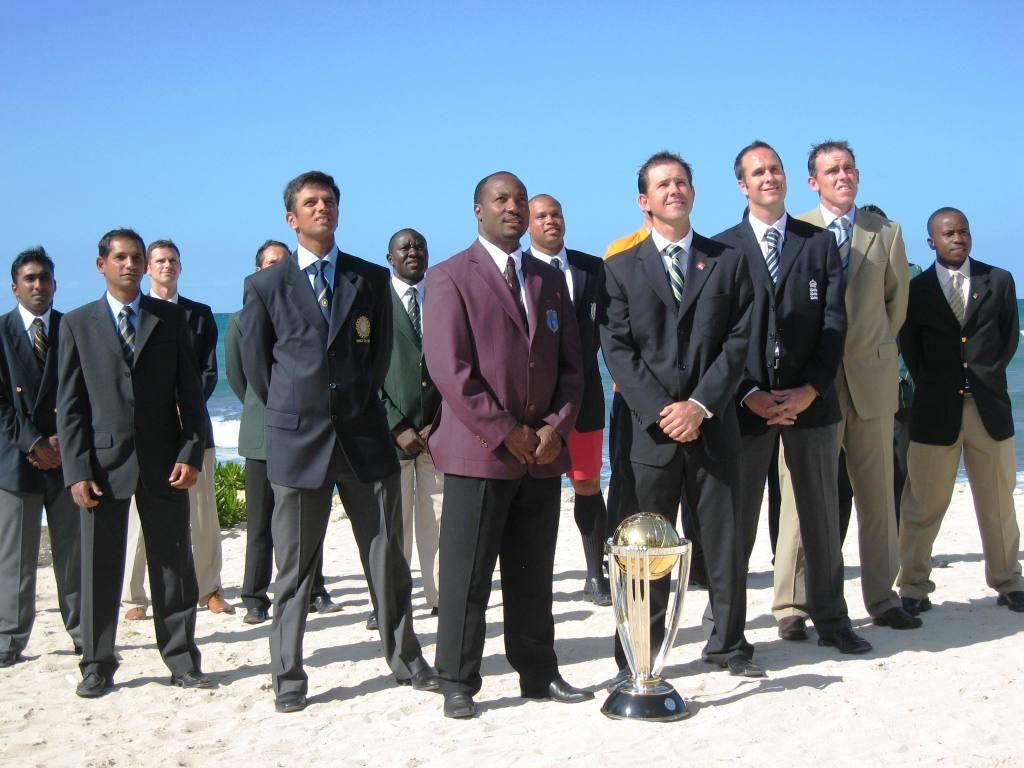
The captains of the 2007 Cricket World Cup.

== Debutant teams ==
Year	Number of teams	Debutant teams
1975	8	Australia, East Africa(D), England, India, New Zealand, Pakistan, Sri Lanka and West Indies
1979	8	Canada
1983	8	Zimbabwe
1987	8	none
1992	9	South Africa
1996	12	Kenya, Netherlands and United Arab Emirates
1999	12	Bangladesh and Scotland
2003	14	Namibia
2007	16	Bermuda and Ireland
2011	14	none
2015	14	Afghanistan
2019	10	none
2023	10	none

(D)- Defunct

== Performance of teams ==
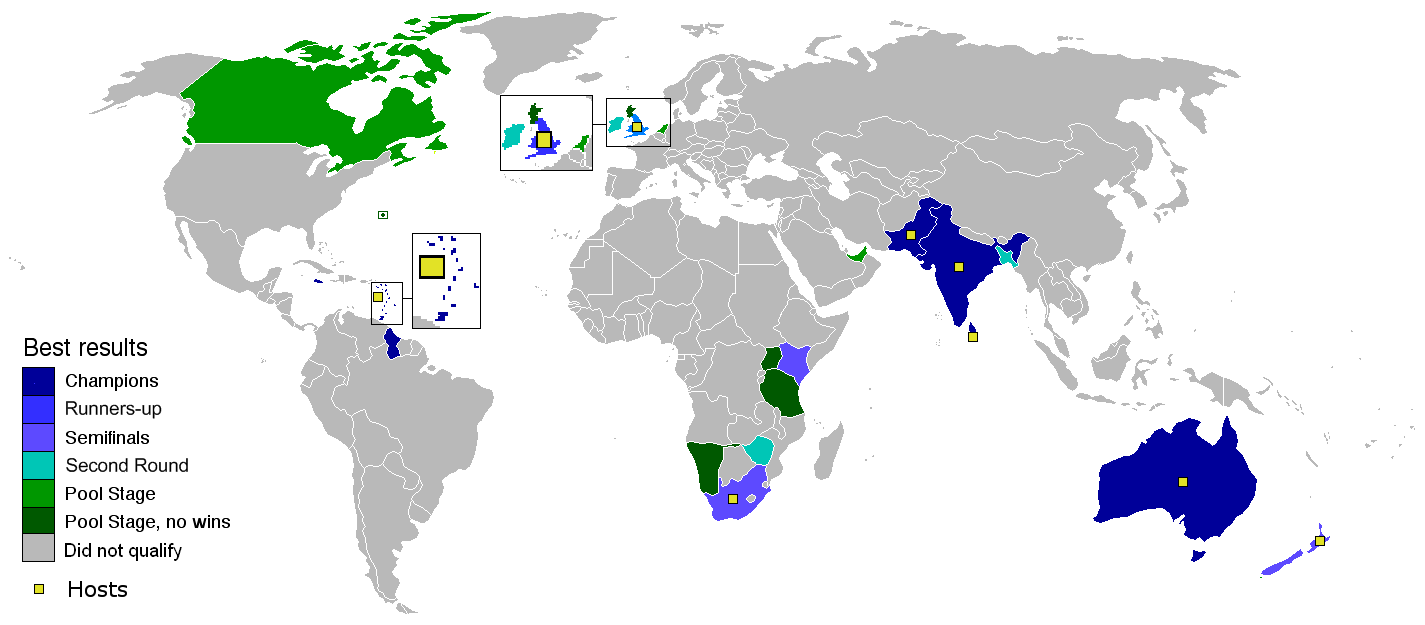
Map of nations' best results after the 2007 Cricket World Cup

So far, 20 teams have competed in the Cricket World Cup at least once (excluding qualifying tournaments). Of these, six teams have taken part in every competition and only six have won. Australia are the current champions.Australia have won six times (1987, 1999, 2003, 2007 and 2015,2023) The West Indies won the first two, India won two (1983 and 2011), Sri Lanka and Pakistan and England won one each. The West Indies and Australia are also the only nations to have won consecutive titles (West Indies: 1975 and 1979; Australia: 1999, 2003 and 2007). Australia have also notably featured in 8 finals of the total 13 World Cups, including the four in a row (1996 to 2007). The furthest a non-Test playing nation has ever reached is the semi-finals, achieved by Kenya in the 2003 tournament.

India is the first host country to have won the world cup on the home ground in 2011. In 2015 Australia became the second host country to win the world cup. The only other host to reach a Final was England in the second tournament in 1979. Sri Lanka and England aside, other co-host nations which achieved or equalled their best finish in World Cups were New Zealand as semi-finalists in 1992 and runners-up in 2015, Zimbabwe reaching the Super Six in 2003 and Kenya as semi-finalists in 2003. In 1987, both co-hosting nations, India and Pakistan reached the semi-finals but neither managed to reach the final after losing to Australia and England respectively.

== Overview ==
The table below provides an overview of the performances of teams over past World Cups, as of the end of the 2023 tournament.

Team	Appearances			Best result	Statistics				
Team	Total	First	Latest	Best result	Played	Won	Lost	Tie	NR
Afghanistan	3	2015	2023	Group stage (2015, 2019, 2023)	20	6	22	0	0
Australia	13	1975	2023	Champions (1987, 1999, 2003, 2007, 2015, 2023)	105	78	25	1	1
Bangladesh	6	1999	2023	Super 8s (2007) & Quarter-finals (2015)	49	16	52	0	1
Bermuda	1	2007	2007	Group stage (2007)	3	0	3	0	0
Canada	4	1979	2011	Group stage (1979, 2003, 2007, 2011)	18	2	16	0	0
East Africa	1	1975	1975	Group stage (1975)	3	0	3	0	0
England	13	1975	2023	Champions (2019)	92	51	38	2	1
India	13	1975	2023	Champions (1983 & 2011)	95	63	30	1	1
Ireland	3	2007	2015	Super 8s (2007)	21	7	13	1	0
Kenya	5	1996	2011	Semi-finals (2003)	29	7	22	0	1
Namibia	1	2003	2003	Group stage (2003)	6	0	6	0	0
Netherlands	4	1996	2023	Group stage (1996, 2003, 2007, 2011, 2023)	29	4	25	0	0
New Zealand	13	1975	2023	Runners-up (2015, 2019)	98	63	37	1	1
Pakistan	13	1975	2023	Champions (1992)	88	45	32	0	2
Scotland	3	1999	2015	Group stage (1999, 2007, 2015)	14	0	14	0	0
South Africa	9	1992	2023	Semi-finals (1992, 1999, 2007, 2015, 2023)	74	38	26	2	1
Sri Lanka	13	1975	2023	Champions (1996)	89	40	46	1	2
United Arab Emirates	2	1996	2015	Group stage (1996 & 2015)	11	1	10	0	0
West Indies	12	1975	2019	Champions (1975 & 1979)	80	43	35	0	2
Zimbabwe	9	1983	2015	Super 6s (1999 & 2003)	57	11	42	1	3
Last updated: 15 July 2019

== Team results ==
Comprehensive team results of the World Cup. See below for legend.

Team \ Host	1975	1979	1983	1987	1992	1996	1999	2003	2007	2011	2015	2019	2023
Team \ Host	(England)	(England)	(England) (Wales)	(India) (Pakistan)	(Australia) (New Zealand)	(India) (Sri Lanka) (Pakistan)	(England) (Scotland) (Republic of Ireland) (Netherlands) (Wales)	(South Africa) (Zimbabwe) (Kenya)	(Cricket West Indies)	(India) (Sri Lanka) (Bangladesh)	(Australia) (New Zealand)	(England) (Wales)	(India)
Afghanistan	did not play										R1	R1	R1
Australia	2nd	R1	R1	1st	R1	2nd	1st	1st	1st	QF	1st	SF	1st
Bangladesh	did not play						R1	R1	S8	R1	QF	R1	R1
Bermuda	did not play								R1	did not play			
Canada	X	R1	did not play					R1	R1	R1	did not play		
East Africa	R1	did not play											
England	SF	2nd	SF	2nd	2nd	QF	R1	R1	S8	QF	R1	1st	R1
India	R1	R1	1st	SF	R1	SF	S6	2nd	R1	1st	SF	SF	2nd
Ireland	did not play								S8	R1	R1	X	X
Kenya	did not play					R1	R1	SF	R1	R1	did not play		
Namibia	did not play							R1	did not play				
Netherlands	did not play					R1	X	R1	R1	R1	X	X	R1
New Zealand	SF	SF	R1	R1	SF	QF	SF	S6	SF	SF	2nd	2nd	SF
Pakistan	R1	SF	SF	SF	1st	QF	2nd	R1	R1	SF	QF	R1	R1
Scotland	did not play						R1	X	R1	X	R1	X	X
South Africa	did not play				SF	QF	SF	R1	SF	QF	SF	R1	SF
Sri Lanka	R1	R1	R1	R1	R1	1st	R1	SF	2nd	2nd	QF	R1	R1
United Arab Emirates	did not play					R1	did not play				R1	X	X
West Indies	1st	1st	2nd	R1	R1	SF	R1	R1	S8	QF	QF	R1	X
Zimbabwe	X	X	R1	R1	R1	R1	S6	S6	R1	R1	R1	X	X

=== Legend ===
- 1st – Champions
- 2nd – Second place
- SF – Semi-finals
- S8 – Super Eight (2007 only)
- S6 – Super Six (1999–2003)
- QF – Quarter-finals (1996, 2011–2015)
- R1 – First Round
- X – Did not play
