= The National Lottery: In It to Win It =

British game show

- Genre: Game show
- Created by: Andrew Brereton; Sarah Edwards; Gail Sloan
- Presented by: Dale Winton
- Narrated by: Alan Dedicoat
- Country of origin: United Kingdom
- Original language: English
- No. of series: 18
- No. of episodes: 172

Production
- Running time: 45 minutes (2002–06); 50 minutes (2006–16)
- Production companies: 12 Yard; BBC Scotland (2010–16)

Original release
- Network: BBC One
- Release: 18 May 2002 – 16 July 2016

Related
- The National Lottery Draws

The National Lottery: In It to Win It was a BBC National Lottery game show which was broadcast on BBC One from 18 May 2002 to 16 July 2016. It was hosted by Dale Winton.

== Format ==
Five contestants competed for a chance to win up to £100,000. They were initially seated in the Waiting Area, on one side of the studio, and each was assigned one of five colours. One ball was drawn at random from a lottery machine, and the contestant matching its colour crossed the studio to sit in Winners' Row. They were asked a series of multiple-choice questions, each with three answer options. Every correct answer added £5,000 to a prize fund, but a miss sent the contestant to the Red Area, between the Waiting Area and Winners' Row.

Another contestant was chosen to move from the Waiting Area to Winners' Row, after which the host then asked an open-ended question to the contestant in the Red Area. A correct answer allowed them to return to Winners' Row, but a wrong answer sent them back to the Waiting Area. No money was at stake on these questions.

If multiple contestants were in Winners' Row at the same time, the host asked a new multiple-choice question to each one in turn, and continued doing so as long as they all answered correctly. Once someone missed a question and went to the Red Area, the host completed the current pass and one contestant was chosen to move from the Waiting Area to Winners' Row. If multiple contestants were in the Red Area at the same time, the host asked an open-ended question to all of them after this choice was made, and they had to collectively agree on an answer. A correct answer allowed them all to move to Winners' Row, while a miss sent them all back to the Waiting Area.

A klaxon sounded after 20 multiple-choice questions had been asked or a certain length of time had elapsed, whichever came first, and all contestants not in Winners' Row at that point were eliminated from the game with no winnings. Those who remained were asked one more multiple-choice question apiece, and all who answered correctly won an equal share of the prize fund. If no one answered correctly, or if no contestants were in Winners' Row after the klaxon sounded, no one won any money. The maximum prize of £100,000 could only be won if a single contestant correctly answered all 20 multiple-choice questions and the extra one.

The programme also included the Saturday night Thunderball, Lotto, Lotto Extra, and its replacement; Dream Number draws. Originally, from series 1 to 5, Winton himself presided over the Lottery draws live. From series 6 onwards, a different presenter at "Lottery HQ" conducted the live draws.

== Transmissions ==
Series	Episodes	Originally released	
Series	Episodes	First released	Last released
1	9	18 May 2002	20 July 2002
2	12	26 April 2003	12 July 2003
3	15	1 May 2004	4 September 2004
4	15	9 July 2005	15 October 2005
5	9	22 July 2006	16 September 2006
6	7	25 November 2006	6 January 2007
7	7	22 September 2007	3 November 2007
8	4	12 January 2008	9 February 2008
9	8	27 December 2008	14 February 2009
10	8	2 January 2010	27 February 2010
11	8	8 May 2010	10 July 2010
12	8	25 September 2010	5 February 2011
13	8	25 June 2011	13 August 2011
14	12	10 March 2012	23 June 2012
15	16	5 January 2013	20 July 2013
16	10	12 April 2014	14 June 2014
17	8	6 September 2014	26 September 2015
18	8	12 September 2015	16 July 2016

== International versions ==
The programme was sold to RTL 4 in the Netherlands as Win't & In't in 2004, hosted by Carlo Boszhard and sold to FOX in Turkey as Kime Niyet Kime Kısmet in 2012 hosted by Celal Kadri Kınoğlu.
