= Whatever You Want (game show) =

British game show (1997–2000)

- Genre: Game show
- Created by: David Young
- Presented by: Gaby Roslin
- Country of origin: United Kingdom
- Original language: English
- No. of series: 4
- No. of episodes: 37 (inc. 1 special)

Production
- Production location: The London Studios
- Running time: 50 minutes
- Production company: Hat Trick Productions

Original release
- Network: BBC One
- Release: 5 April 1997 – 10 June 2000

Whatever You Want is a game show on BBC One, which ran from 5 April 1997 to 10 June 2000. It was hosted by Gaby Roslin.

== Transmissions ==
=== Series ===
Series	Start date	End date	Episodes
1	5 April 1997	24 May 1997	8
2	28 March 1998	30 May 1998	10
3	10 April 1999	5 June 1999	9
4	8 April 2000	10 June 2000	10

=== Specials ===
Date	Entitle
24 December 1998	Christmas Special
