= Playing for Time (game show) =

- Genre: Game show
- Presented by: Eamonn Holmes
- Country of origin: United Kingdom
- Original language: English
- No. of series: 2
- No. of episodes: 60

Production
- Running time: 30 minutes

Original release
- Network: BBC One
- Release: 13 November 2000 – 23 July 2001

Playing for Time is a BBC Television daytime quiz programme that aired on BBC One from 13 November 2000 to 23 July 2001. The programme is hosted by Eamonn Holmes.

== Format ==
The game is played in a best two-out-of-three rounds format. In each round, both players are allotted 60 seconds on separate clocks; when one player runs out of time, the other player wins the round and banks the time left on their clock.

=== Rounds 1 and 2: Play for Time ===
The host asks a three-choice question, and both players' clocks start simultaneously. Each player's clock stops as soon as they press a button to select an answer. If both are correct, a new question is asked. If one player misses, they are asked "time-waster" questions that involve word puzzles or mathematical calculations, with their clock running until they give a correct answer.

If both players miss the same three-choice question, a time-waster is asked as a toss-up and both clocks stop as soon as either of them buzzes-in. A correct response forces the opponent to answer a new time-waster, but a miss requires that player to do so instead. The affected player's clock runs until they answer correctly, after which the three-choice questions resume.

If the same player wins both rounds, they win the match; if both players win a round, they play "Extra Time" to decide the winner.

=== Round 3: Extra Time ===
Starting with the player who has banked less time, the host asks open-ended general knowledge questions. A correct answer stops the player's clock and passes control to the opponent. When one player runs out of time, the opponent wins the match and banks any time remaining on their own clock.

The champion is then shown the next contestant in line and given some biographical information about that person. They must then choose to either use their banked time to play the bonus round, or play a new match against that contestant in the hope of accumulating more time. A champion who loses a match must leave the show.

=== Bonus Round ===
The champion selects one of three trips that they would like to try to win. Using the total time they have banked, they must answer five questions correctly in order to win the trip. The champion must leave the show after one attempt at the bonus round.

== Transmissions ==
Series	Start date	End date	Episodes
1	13 November 2000	15 December 2000	25
2	4 June 2001	23 July 2001	35
