= Who Dares Wins (British game show) =

British television game show

- Also known as: The National Lottery: Who Dares Wins
- Genre: Game show
- Created by: Jim Cannon; Andy Culpin; Sam Pollard; David Young
- Presented by: Nick Knowles
- Country of origin: United Kingdom
- Original language: English
- No. of series: 12
- No. of episodes: 107

Production
- Production locations: BBC Television Centre (2007); The London Studios (2008); BBC Pacific Quay (2010–11); Granada Studios (2012); Dock10 (2013–19)
- Running time: 50 minutes (2007–17); 40 minutes (2017–19)
- Production companies: 12 Yard; BBC Scotland (2018–19)

Original release
- Network: BBC One
- Release: 17 November 2007 – 7 September 2019

Related
- The National Lottery Draws

Who Dares Wins (titled The National Lottery: Who Dares Wins during National Lottery draws) is a British television game show broadcast on BBC One. It premiered on 17 November 2007 and concluded on 7 September 2019. The programme was hosted by Nick Knowles and was based on Fox’s short-lived American game show The Rich List, which originated as an unaired ITV pilot before being commissioned in the United States.

From 2007 until 2016, the programme formed part of the BBC’s National Lottery game show lineup and was broadcast between Lottery draws.

== Format ==
Two teams, each consisting of two contestants who have never met before, are placed in separate soundproof pods. Audio to each pod can be switched on or off throughout the game, either isolating a team or allowing both teams to hear one another.

A list subject is announced to both teams (for example, “20th-century Academy Award-nominated films” or “highest-grossing authors in the United Kingdom”), along with a brief explanation of what constitutes a valid answer. The teams then take turns bidding on how many correct answers they believe they can provide. A team’s pod is activated only during their bid, and they are informed of the opposing team’s current bid.

The bidding ends when one team dares the other to play the list, at which point both pods are activated. If the bidding team supplies the stated number of correct answers without a mistake, they win the list; otherwise, the opposing team wins it. The first team to win two lists becomes champion and advances to the bonus round.

=== Tiebreaker ===
If each team wins one of the first two lists, a tiebreaker is played. A new list subject is announced and both pods are activated. Teams then alternate providing one answer at a time. If both teams answer correctly or both answer incorrectly, play continues; when only one team answers correctly, that team wins the game.

=== Bonus round (The Money List) ===
The champions are given a new list subject and may attempt to provide up to 15 correct answers to win cash prizes as follows:

Correct answers	Winnings
3	£5,000
6	£10,000
9	£15,000
12	£25,000
15	£50,000

After every third correct answer, the team may choose to leave the round and bank their winnings. An incorrect answer at any point ends the round and forfeits the accumulated prize money; money won in previous Money List rounds is retained. After 15 correct answers, the team automatically banks the full £50,000.

There is no limit on the number of games a team may play or the total amount of money they can win. All winnings are split equally between teammates.

Three champion teams chose to leave the programme rather than continue. In each instance, the following game featured two new teams.

== Records ==
The highest number of games won by a team is 12, achieved by Chrissy from Blackrod and Joe from Canterbury.

Trish McGowan and Seamus Hassain won the highest total amount, £170,000, across eight victories.

Chrissy and Joe are second in total winnings with £165,000 over 12 games. Nat Moitt and Euan Fleming are third with £155,000 across seven games. Moitt and Fleming also held the record for the most answers given on a single list (40, for chemical elements) until series 7, episode 5, when Hayley and Ranjit named 52 words from Bohemian Rhapsody.

== Transmissions ==
Series	Start date	End date	Episodes
1	17 November 2007	29 December 2007	7
2	13 September 2008	1 November 2008	8
3	6 March 2010	1 May 2010	8
4	23 April 2011	18 June 2011	8
5	7 January 2012	3 March 2012	8
6	23 March 2013	11 May 2013	8
7	4 January 2014	15 March 2014	9
8	23 May 2015	18 July 2015	8
9	22 October 2016	8 April 2017	13
10	15 April 2017	16 September 2017	10
11	24 March 2018	28 July 2018	10
12	4 May 2019	7 September 2019	10
