= Scott Jones (athlete) =

English athlete

Personal information
- Nationality: United Kingdom
- Born: 4 February 1998 (age 28)

Sport
- Country: Great Britain
- Sport: Athletics
- Event: shot put

Achievements and titles
- Personal best: shot put: 13.38m
Medal record
Track and field (athletics)
Representing Great Britain
IPC World Championships
Gold medal – first place	2013 Lyon	shot put - T34

Scott Jones (born 4 February 1998) is a parasport athlete from England. Formerly competing mainly in F34 throwing events, Jones won gold and a new world record in the F34 shot put at the 2013 IPC Athletics World Championships. After an injury Jones took on rowing, continuing his aim towards participating in 2020 Summer Paralympics.

Jones appeared in the DIY SOS: The Big Build reality show on TV, recorded in 2015.

== Career history ==
Jones was a keen sports enthusiast as a youngster and enjoyed both athletics and rugby union before three stroke like symptoms left him without use of the right side of his body. On recovery he returned to athletics and, despite a further stroke which left him in a wheelchair, he found an aptitude for the shot put.

Jones was not selected for the Great Britain team at the 2012 Summer Paralympics in London as it was believed the pressure on a then 14-year-old, would have been too great. In 2013, at the Fazza International Athletics, Jones set records in both the discus and shot put. He then joined the Great Britain team at the 2013 IPC Athletics World Championships, representing his country in the F34 shot put. Jones was one of the early competitors in his event and on his fifth throw he recorded a world record distance of 13 meters and 38 centimeters. None of his rivals could match his distance, making Jones the new world champion at the age of 15.

After a sporting injury to his throwing arm, Jones turned to rowing in 2015. Enrolled to Hartpury College for Sport and Exercise Sciences studies he focuses on training for international competitions while aiming for university and a job within the sport science industry.

In 2018 it was reported that Jones had become national champion and achieved world records several times and was now looking to take part in the 2020 Summer Paralympics in Tokyo.

== Media ==
The DIY SOS: The Big Build TV-show featured Scott Jones in an episode first aired September 2016. In 9 days the house where he lived with his parents was "completely rebuilt" to make it wheel-chair accessible and allow the 17-year-old to more independently go about daily life and interests such as cooking and work-outs.
