= Julia Kendell =

British interior designer

Julia Kendell (born 25 April 1968) is an English interior designer, television presenter and writer.

== Biography ==
Born in Middlesex, Kendell went to Newnham Junior School in Eastcote, and Haydon Secondary School in Northwood.

== Career ==
Aged 14 she began working in a local soft furnishings shop, and developed a career in interior design after being offered the manager's job aged 18. She specialises in kitchen design, bespoke cabinetry and lighting design and writes for interiors magazines including Real Homes and House Beautiful. Her signature style is 'rustic contemporary'. She regularly speaks at Home Shows across the UK and abroad and mentors the Homebase Decorating Academy. In 2012 she designed the interior of the venue for Nick Knowles and his wife Jessica's wedding in the UK. In 2015 Kendell collaborated with Danetti UK designing and launching a new range of dining furniture.

== Television career ==
Kendell's first television appearances were for ITV's 60 Minute Makeover for which she made eight series between 2004 and 2014, most recently co-presenting with Peter Andre. She has also appeared in a two-part special for Tonight with Trevor McDonald highlighting the demolition and refurbishment debate of Victorian housing stock in the UK. In January 2008 Julia took over the role of designer for DIY SOS on BBC One. Three years later Kendell was instrumental in taking SOS to an hour-long 'Big Build' format where the team complete entire house builds over a 9-day period involving an army of trades volunteers. In April 2011, she was the DIY and makeover expert for Daybreak's "Guide to Transforming Your Home", in 2012 she appeared on several episodes of The Alan Titchmarsh Show, and in 2015 'Rebuild Our Home' with Nicky Campbell for ITV.

== Personal life ==
Having moved to Henley on Thames with her first husband, she now lives in the area with her partner, James. She has renovated and built homes in the area including an award-winning self-build eco home constructed in 2008.
