= Mission Africa (TV series) =

- Starring: Nick Knowles
- Country of origin: United Kingdom
- Original language: English
- No. of seasons: 1
- No. of episodes: 12

Production
- Running time: 30 minutes

Original release
- Network: BBC One
- Release: 3 January – 23 April 2007

Mission Africa is a 12-part prime time television series produced by Diverse Bristol for BBC One and BBC Worldwide which follows fifteen trainees from the building trade, selected from hundreds of applicants across the UK, as they undertake various building and conservation projects. The 12 part series ran beginning of January 2007.

== Summary ==
The project follows the 15 apprentices into the hostile frontier lands of Northern Kenya, with their expedition leader Ken Hames (Beyond Boundaries) and new foreman Nick Knowles (DIY SOS). The team find themselves in the Sera Conservancy, marooned by a dry river bed with no water, as well as being surrounded by dangerous animals like a bull elephant.

Working side by side with local people the trainees have just six weeks to build an ecolodge, dig boreholes for water and help local wildlife experts repopulate the area with animals. The team of rookie builders, electricians, plumbers and architects have no experience of working and surviving in the African bush. They have to get the build completed while satisfying the needs of the local Samburu tribal leaders who need water for their domestic stock, as well as the wildlife they have been pledged to protect.

Nick Knowles and former Special Forces Major Ken Hames put together the team, and are in charge of turning the volunteers into a united workforce. Ken, an expert on the African Frontier, also trains the team as wildlife rangers. Nick, Ken and the trainees live in tents in the bush alongside their African team mates who were working with them on the site. At night the camp is protected by rangers, as nocturnal visitors include elephants and lions.

As the series progresses the ranger trainees capture six giraffes to relocate to a new reserve, track rhino and tag elephant. Their training takes place at Lewa, a conservancy further south, and the template for the initiative at Sera, a new community conservation area in the far north of Kenya towards the Ethiopian and Somali borders. Sera is an area that for many years has been ravaged by tribal conflict, bandits and poaching and where conservancy experts are trying to bring security, stability and prosperity to the people.

The aim of the project is to enhance the work done by conservancies to conserve wildlife and its habitat with the support of local communities. This is done through the protection and management of species, the initiation and support of community conservation and development programmes, and the education of neighbouring areas in the value of wildlife. With wildlife encouraged back to Sera, it is hoped that tourists and investors will come to stay at the new lodge and view the wildlife close up. It will also provide better access to water for the local community as well as work and income.

== Critical reception ==
The show received mixed to positive reviews. Sam Wollaston of The Guardian commented on the cast's "privileged" attempt at "saving" Africa, while making a droll comparison that the skill-sets used in the television show DIY SOS would be on par with combating famine, drought, and civil war. Imogen Tilden did, however, offer a contrary view on the shows merits. And found Wollaston's review cynical. Nick Curwin of Broadcast found the show refreshing compared to the "lazy, spoilt, bland, self-obsessed wannabes doing nothing of any possible consequence" on reality television.
