= Too Hot to Handle (TV series) =

British reality television series

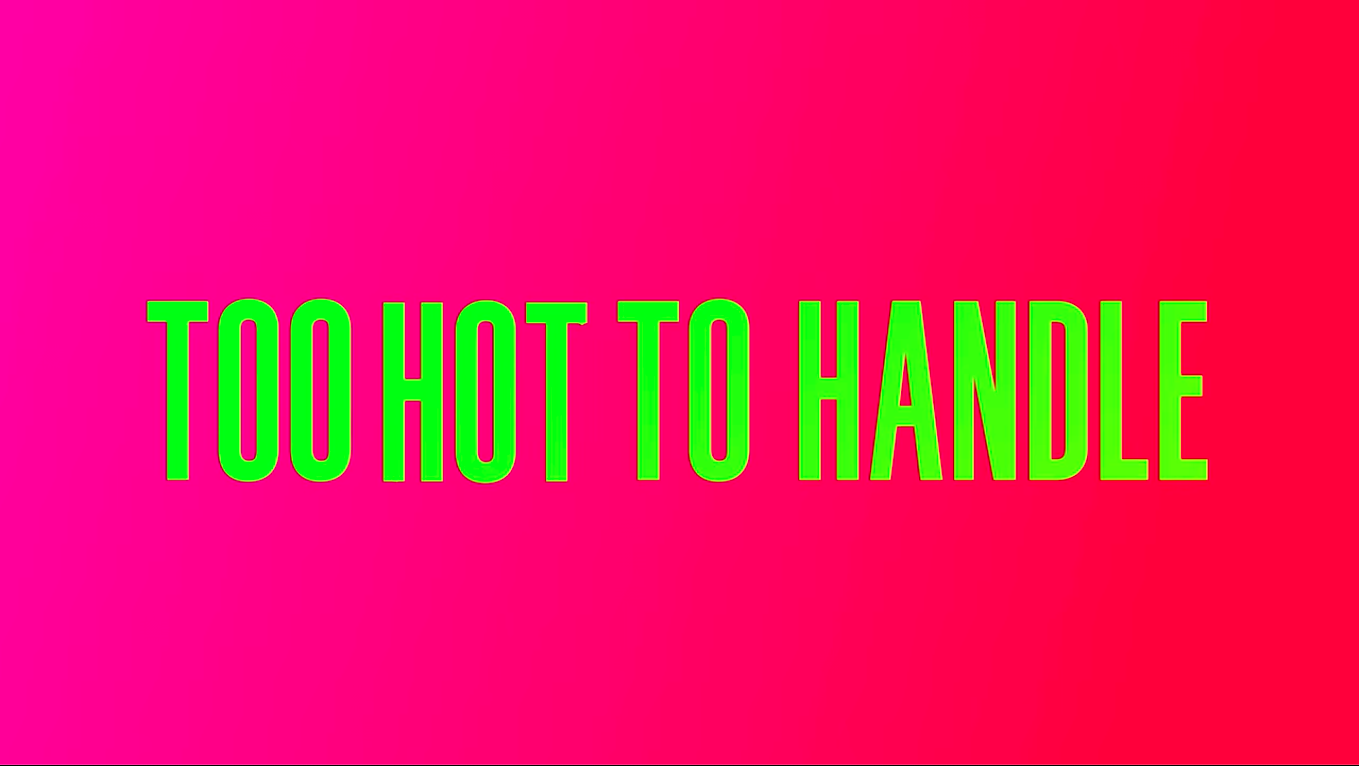
- Genre: Reality; Dating game show
- Created by: Laura Gibson; Charlie Bennett
- Based on: "The Contest" from Seinfeld by Larry David and Jerry Seinfeld
- Developed by: Charlie Bennett; Laura Gibson
- Presented by: Lana
- Narrated by: Desiree Burch
- Country of origin: United Kingdom
- Original language: English
- No. of series: 6
- No. of episodes: 59

Production
- Executive producers: Viki Kolar; Jonno Richards; Ed Sleeman; Leon Wilson
- Production locations: Punta Mita, Mexico; Turks and Caicos Islands
- Running time: 36–43 minutes
- Production companies: Talkback; Thames

Original release
- Network: Netflix
- Release: 17 April 2020 – 2 August 2024

Too Hot to Handle is a British reality television dating game show produced by Fremantle production companies Talkback and Thames. Created by Laura Gibson and Charlie Bennett, the show's eight-episode first series was released on Netflix on 17 April 2020. Hosted by a virtual assistant named "Lana", the show revolves around a group of adults, who are placed together in a house while being forbidden from any kissing, sexual contact or masturbation, with the prize money getting reduced any time a rule is broken.

In January 2021, Too Hot to Handle was renewed for two more seasons, both of which were filmed back-to-back amid the COVID-19 pandemic on the Turks and Caicos Islands. The first half of the second series was released 23 June 2021, and the second half a week later on 30 June 2021. The third series premiered on 19 January 2022. The fourth series premiered on 7 December 2022. The fifth series premiered on 14 July 2023. The sixth and final series premiered on 19 July 2024.

== Premise ==
Hosted by a traffic cone-shaped virtual assistant named "Lana", the show revolves around a group of adults – all of whom primarily engage in meaningless flings and prefer not to form long-lasting relationships – who are placed together in a house on a tropical island for four weeks. Initially led to believe they are on a fictional, raunchy show, the contestants are later informed by Lana of the true purpose behind their stay, and that they are forbidden from any kissing, sexual contact, or self-gratification for the duration of it. The contestants start with a $100,000 grand prize in the first and second seasons and $200,000 in the remaining seasons. Across each season, the prize total is reduced each time a rule is broken. Alongside these restrictions, the contestants are put through various workshops aimed at aiding personal growth, in order to foster genuine connections between them.

Each season starts with 10 new contestants, although later new additions occasionally join throughout. Similarly, contestants who are unable to form connections in the house or commit to the process are sometimes kicked out, while others may voluntarily withdraw if they feel that their personal growth would be better facilitated outside of the show's environment.

== Episodes ==
=== Series overview ===
Series	Episodes	Originally released	
Series	Episodes	First released	Last released
1	9	17 April 2020	8 May 2020
2	10	23 June 2021	30 June 2021
3	10	19 January 2022	
4	10	7 December 2022	14 December 2022
5	10	14 July 2023	28 July 2023
6	10	19 July 2024	2 August 2024

=== Season 1 (2020) ===
No. overall	No. in season	Title	Prize money	Original release date
1	1	"Love, Sex or Money"	$100,000	17 April 2020
2	2	"When Harry Met Francesca"	$97,000	17 April 2020
3	3	"Revenge Is a Dish Best Served Hot"	$94,000	17 April 2020
4	4	"Two's Company, Three's a ... Threesome"	$94,000	17 April 2020
5	5	"Boys to Men"	$75,000	17 April 2020
6	6	"The Bryce Isn't Right"	$55,000	17 April 2020
7	7	"Sisters over Misters"	$43,000	17 April 2020
8	8	"Lust or Bust"	$75,000	17 April 2020
9	9	"Extra Hot: The Reunion"	-	8 May 2020

=== Season 2 (2021) ===
No. overall	No. in season	Title	Prize money	Original release date
10	1	"C**kblocked by a Cone"	$100,000	23 June 2021
11	2	"You Gotta Watch Out for Pete"	$79,000	23 June 2021
12	3	"On Est dans la Merde"	$73,000	23 June 2021
13	4	"Resist Everything… Except Temptation"	$68,000	23 June 2021
14	5	"An Offer You Can't Refuse"	$68,000	30 June 2021
15	6	"Give Up the Chase"	$60,000	30 June 2021
16	7	"Misters over Sisters"	$40,000	30 June 2021
17	8	"Money Down the Drain"	$30,000	30 June 2021
18	9	"Green Lights and Hot Nights"	$55,000	30 June 2021
19	10	"I Did Not See That Coming"	$55,000	30 June 2021

=== Season 3 (2022) ===
No. overall	No. in season	Title	Prize money	Original release date
20	1	"No Pleasure Island"	$200,000	19 January 2022
21	2	"The Midnight Train to Georgia"	$197,000	19 January 2022
22	3	"The Truth Hurts"	$155,000	19 January 2022
23	4	"Eat My Shorts"	$143,000	19 January 2022
24	5	"The Summer of '69"	$74,000	19 January 2022
25	6	"Triple Threat"	$68,000	19 January 2022
26	7	"Yoni Live Once"	$46,000	19 January 2022
27	8	"Reaching Rock Bottom"	$0	19 January 2022
28	9	"Paradise Purgatory"	$0	19 January 2022
29	10	"Out with a Bang"	$90,000	19 January 2022

=== Season 4 (2022) ===
No. overall	No. in season	Title	Prize money	Original release date
30	1	"The Mile Dry Club"	$200,000	7 December 2022
31	2	"There's Something About Nigel"	$191,000	7 December 2022
32	3	"Officer Kill Joy"	$167,000	7 December 2022
33	4	"Flavia of the Month"	$167,000	7 December 2022
34	5	"The Shower and the Glory"	$117,000	7 December 2022
35	6	"Puppets for Playas"	$79,000	14 December 2022
36	7	"Trust or Bust"	$89,000	14 December 2022
37	8	"It's Raining Love Triangles"	$89,000	14 December 2022
38	9	"Jawahir, Jawa-there"	$89,000	14 December 2022
39	10	"Growth Is a Team Game"	$89,000	14 December 2022

=== Season 5 (2023) ===
No. overall	No. in season	Title	Prize money	Original release date
40	1	"Up Ships Creek"	$200,000	14 July 2023
41	2	"A Matter of Pact"	$164,000	14 July 2023
42	3	"Stick or Twist"	$152,000	14 July 2023
43	4	"Court in the Act"	$146,000	14 July 2023
44	5	"Driving Me Bananas"	$98,000	21 July 2023
45	6	"Making Kiss-tory"	$110,000	21 July 2023
46	7	"Defective Detective"	$110,000	21 July 2023
47	8	"Is It Too Late to Say Sorry?"	$100,000	28 July 2023
48	9	"Love or Money"	$100,000	28 July 2023
49	10	"The Climax"	$100,000	28 July 2023

=== Season 6 (2024) ===
No. overall	No. in season	Title	Prize money	Original release date
50	1	"Bad to the Cone"	$250,000	19 July 2024
51	2	"Paper Clips & Pay Per View"	$229,000	19 July 2024
52	3	"I'll Have What She's Having"	$199,000	19 July 2024
53	4	"Clocked Blocked"	$193,000	19 July 2024
54	5	"Demari's Demise"	$137,000	26 July 2024
55	6	"Womb for Improvement"	$131,000	26 July 2024
56	7	"A 99.7% Chance of Trouble"	$131,000	26 July 2024
57	8	"Sealed with a Chris"	$131,000	2 August 2024
58	9	"To Bri or Not to Bri"	$125,000	2 August 2024
59	10	"A Prize Surprise"	$125,000	2 August 2024

== Production ==
=== Background ===
The show was created by Laura Gibson and developed by Charlie Bennett, citing the Seinfeld episode, "The Contest" as their inspiration for the premise of Too Hot to Handle. Laura Gibson, creative director of Fremantle-owned production company Talkback, which produced the eight-part series, told Deadline Hollywood that she had been working to produce a dating show since 2016.

Viki Kolar and Jonno Richards, executive producers for Too Hot to Handle, said they found inspiration for the virtual character from artificial intelligence and virtual assistants, especially in video surveillance. Viki Kolar stated, "[A.I.] is literally everywhere around us. It's kind of governing us, it's taking over," in an interview with Glamour.

=== Development ===
On 5 May 2019, Netflix Studios, LLC applied to trademark the phrase "Too Hot to Handle" for all educational, training, entertainment, sporting, and cultural purposes. The application was approved on 24 June 2019, and was extended on 5 March 2020. Too Hot to Handle is produced by Fremantle production company Talkback.

The show, instead of using a human as its host, used a virtual assistant named Lana. Desiree Burch provided voice-over narration, making snarky and comedic remarks towards the contestants.

During seasons 1–5, Lana remained the only host of Too Hot to Handle. In season 6, the usual format of the show was altered by the introduction of "Bad Lana" who tempts the cast to act in the exact opposite manner that Lana would. In past seasons, the cast of Too Hot to Handle did not know what show they had signed up for (and had the news announced to them by Lana). However, in season 6, the cast members knew what show they were on.

This prompted the introduction of "Bad Lana" to add a twist to how cast members believed their time on the show would go. With Bad Lana comes the invention of "Lana's Bunker" in which participants who are thrown out of the villa go to stay for a second chance.

=== Casting ===
In 2018, Talkback announced that casting for an untitled reality television show was open. In total, over 3,000 people auditioned for the show. Producer Louise Peet stated that the people who ultimately ended up being on the show stood out to the casting team and were chosen quickly.

=== Filming ===
A luxury resort called Casa Tau in Punta Mita, Mexico opened to guests in December 2018. Soon after, Too Hot to Handle started filming at Casa Tau in late March 2019 and ended filming in April. After filming had ended, all fourteen contestants were able to spend several days at the resort with no cameras before going home.

Seasons 2 & 3 were filmed in Providenciales, Turks and Caicos at the Turtle Tail estate. Seasons 4 & 5 were also filmed in Turks and Caicos, but in Leeward at an estate on the Emerald Point Peninsula. Lastly, season 6 was filmed at Triton Villa on Turks and Caicos as well.

=== Release ===
On 10 April 2020, Netflix released the trailer for the first season of Too Hot to Handle. The first season of Too Hot to Handle consisted of eight episodes, all of which were released on 17 April 2020 on Netflix. A reunion episode aired on 8 May 2020, where Desiree Burch interviewed the fourteen contestants. The first four episodes of the second season premiered on 23 June 2021, while the remaining six episodes premiered on 30 June 2021. The third season was released on 19 January 2022. The first five episodes of the fourth season premiered on 7 December 2022, while the remaining five episodes premiered on 14 December 2022. The first four episodes of the fifth season premiered on 14 July 2023. The next three episodes were released on 21 July 2023, and the final three episodes of the fifth season were released on 28 July 2023.

Netflix released three spinoff mobile games, Too Hot to Handle: Love is a Game (2022) Too Hot to Handle 2 (2023), and Too Hot to Handle 3 (2024). As of March 2023, Love is a Game was Netflix's most played game.

=== Prize ===
==== Season 1 ====
At the allocation ceremony, the ten remaining contestants became the winners. Francesca Farago, Harry Jowsey, Kelz Dyke, Bryce Hirschberg, Chloe Veitch, David Birtwistle, Lydia Clyma, Nicole O'Brien, Rhonda Paul, and Sharron Townsend all split the $75,000 prize fund, resulting in $7,500 for each person.

==== Season 2 ====
At the allocation ceremony, it came down to three contestants: Carly Lawrence, Cam Holmes, and Marvin Anthony. The fellow finalists were the ones who voted for the winner, selecting Marvin as the winner of the $55,000 prize fund.

==== Season 3 ====
At the allocation ceremony, it came down to four contestants: Beaux Raymond & Harry Johnson (as a couple), Georgia Hassarati, and Nathan Soan Mngomezulu. The fellow finalists were the ones who voted for the winner, selecting Beaux and Harry as the winners of the $90,000 prize fund.

==== Season 4 ====
At the allocation ceremony, it came down to two couples: Jawahir Khalifa & Nick Kici, and Kayla Richart & Seb Melrose. The fellow finalists voted for the winner, with Jawahir & Nick winning the $89,000 prize fund with a final vote of 6 votes to 1.

==== Season 5 ====
At the allocation ceremony, it came down to two contestants: Elys Hutchinson and Dre Woodard. The fellow finalists voted for Elys to win the $100,000 prize fund. Elys decided to split the prize fund with runner-up Dre, resulting in $50,000 for both contestants.

==== Season 6 ====
The prize fund was at $125,000 when it came to the allocation ceremony. Lana announced that there would be three winners this season, one couple and one single who was committed to the rules of the retreat. The couple would win the $100,000 and the single would win the $25,000. Demari Davis & Bri Belram and Charlie Jeer & Katherine LaPrell were announced as the two couples in the running for the $100,000. Demari & Bri won the $100,000 following a 7–1 vote from the finalists, leaving Charlie & Katherine as the runners-up. Gianna Pettus was chosen by Lana as the single to win the $25,000, leaving Chris Aalli and Lucy Syed as the runners-up for that prize money.

== Reception ==
=== Viewership ===
The first season of Too Hot to Handle became the No. 1 television program on Netflix during the week of 20 April 2020. It currently has over 43,800,000 hours of viewership.

The second season of Too Hot to Handle accumulated 111,680,000 hours watched while in the Netflix Global Top Ten; season 3 racked up 72,840,000 view hours, and season 4 scored 74,900,000 hours. Season 5 garnered 137,300,000 hours of viewing, and season 6 ended up with 101,100,000 view hours.

=== Critical response ===
Review aggregator website Rotten Tomatoes gives the first season of Too Hot to Handle 36%, holding an average rating of 4.9 out of 10 from 28 reviews. Metacritic, which uses a weighted average, gives the series a score of 43 based on 13 reviews, indicating "mixed or average reviews".

Critic John Serba of Decider panned the show, describing it as "a mashup of Temptation Island, Love Island, "The Contest" episode of Seinfeld and The Peter Griffin Sideboob Hour", stating that "to call it tawdry is to engage in nuclear understatement", calling it "some of the dreckiest dreck ever drecked", and advising viewers to skip it.

Rachelle Hampton of Slate also wrote a negative review, stating: "Despite an irresistibly juicy premise, Too Hot to Handle doesn't know what kind of show it wants to be, and it suffers for lack of direction. (...) Its will-they-or-won't-they concept is ruined as soon as it becomes clear that, yes, they obviously will, even if it means losing tens of thousands of dollars."

== International versions ==
Country	Title	Network(s)	Host(s)	Premiere	Seasons
Brazil	Too Hot to Handle: Brazil; Brincando com Fogo: Brasil	Netflix	Bruna Louise	July 21, 2021	2
Germany	Too Hot to Handle: Germany	Netflix	TBA	February 28, 2023	2 (Next season confirmed)
Mexico	Too Hot to Handle: Latino; Jugando con Fuego: Latino	Netflix	Itatí Cantoral	September 15, 2021	1
Spain	Too Hot to Handle: Spain; Jugando con Fuego	Netflix	Alba Carrillo	June 13, 2025	1
Italy	Too Hot to Handle: Italy	Netflix	Fred De Palma (season 1); Selvaggia Lucarelli (season 2)	July 18, 2025	1 (Next season confirmed)
