= Naomi Cleaver =

Naomi Cleaver (born 14 July 1967 in Whitstable, Kent, England) is a British design consultant and interior designer.

She is also a television presenter of such programs as Other People's Houses and Channel 4's Honey I Ruined the House. In October 2014, she was the designer for DIY SOS.
