= Guesstimation (game show) =

British quiz show

- Genre: Game show
- Presented by: Nick Knowles
- Country of origin: United Kingdom
- Original language: English
- No. of series: 1
- No. of episodes: 8

Production
- Running time: 50 minutes
- Production companies: Talpa and Initial

Original release
- Network: BBC One
- Release: 11 July – 29 August 2009

Related
- The National Lottery Draws

Guesstimation is a BBC National Lottery game show which was broadcast on BBC One from 11 July to 29 August 2009. It was hosted by Nick Knowles.

== Format ==
In the show two families try to out-guess each other to win a holiday, with the help of challenges performed by celebrity and Olympic guests.

== Ratings ==
| Episode no. | Airdate | Viewers (millions) | BBC One weekly ranking |
|---|---|---|---|
| 1 | 11 July 2009 | 5.05 | 13 |
| 2 | 18 July 2009 | 4.93 | 13 |
| 3 | 25 July 2009 | 3.96 | 23 |
| 4 | 1 August 2009 | 3.98 | 24 |
| 5 | 8 August 2009 | 3.62 | 26 |
| 6 | 15 August 2009 | 4.04 | 20 |
| 7 | 22 August 2009 | —N/a | —N/a |
| 8 | 29 August 2009 | —N/a | —N/a |
