= Real Rescues =

- Genre: Documentary
- Presented by: Chris Hollins (2012); Louise Minchin (2009–2012); Nick Knowles (2007-2011, 2013)
- Country of origin: United Kingdom
- Original language: English
- No. of series: 10
- No. of episodes: 228

Production
- Executive producers: Kate Roberts; Chris Riley
- Running time: 28–58 minutes

Original release
- Network: BBC One
- Release: 15 October 2007 – 25 October 2013

Real Rescues is a British documentary broadcast on BBC One exploring the daily work of the emergency services aired from 2007 to 2013. Real Rescues was at the heart of the action with the emergency services of Hampshire including the police, fire, ambulance, coastguard and lifeboat crews. The majority of the footage was shot around Portsmouth and Fareham. In the later series, other counties from across the UK began to be featured. Other emergency services, such as mountain rescue and animal rescue, were also featured. The show was axed in 2013.

The programme reran on W and CBS Reality until 2017.

== Episodes ==
| Series | Episodes | | Presenters | Originally released (UK) | |
| Series | Episodes | | Presenters | First released | Last released |
|---|---|---|---|---|---|
| 1 | 20 | | Nick Knowles and Louise Minchin | 15 October 2007 | 9 November 2007 |
| 2 (Note: The last 20 episodes of series 2 contained edited versions of series 1 content.) | 40 | 20 | Nick Knowles and Louise Minchin | 29 September 2008 | 24 October 2008 |
| 2 | 40 | 20 | Nick Knowles and Louise Minchin | 29 April 2008 | 9 December 2008 |
| 3 | 20 | | Nick Knowles and Louise Minchin | 20 April 2009 | 15 May 2009 |
| 4 | 20 | | Nick Knowles and Louise Minchin | 2 November 2009 | 27 November 2009 |
| 5 (Note: The last 8 episodes of series 5 contained edited versions of series 3 content.) | 28 | 20 | Nick Knowles and Louise Minchin | 5 July 2010 | 16 July 2010 |
| 5 | 28 | 8 | Nick Knowles and Louise Minchin | 1 July 2009 | 22 October 2010 |
| 6 | 20 | | Nick Knowles and Louise Minchin | 22 November 2010 | 10 December 2010 |
| 7 | 20 | | Nick Knowles and Louise Minchin | 30 May 2011 | 24 June 2011 |
| 8 | 20 | | Chris Hollins and Louise Minchin | 11 June 2012 | 6 July 2012 |
| 9 | 20 | | Nick Knowles | 11 March 2013 | 5 April 2013 |
| 10 | 20 | | Nick Knowles | 30 September 2013 | 25 October 2013 |
