= Perfection (game show) =

British quiz show (2011–2015)

- Genre: Quiz show
- Developed by: Liz Gaskell; Nick Pagan; Jimmy Woolley; Josephine Brassey
- Presented by: Nick Knowles
- Country of origin: United Kingdom
- Original language: English
- No. of series: 5
- No. of episodes: 240

Production
- Running time: 45 minutes
- Production companies: 12 Yard; BBC Scotland (2012–15)

Original release
- Network: BBC Two (2011–12, 2015); BBC One (2013–14)
- Release: 17 January 2011 – 30 March 2015

Perfection is a BBC quiz show which was hosted by Nick Knowles. It was first shown on BBC Two from 17 January 2011 to 10 February 2012, then shown on BBC One from 2 January 2013 to 31 October 2014 and then back on BBC Two from 2 to 30 March 2015.

== Format ==
Two complete games are played per episode. Each game begins with four participants (referred to by the host as "the usual suspects") who are sequestered in a soundproof booth backstage. One of the four is chosen at random to play the game onstage as a contestant, while the others remain in the booth, unable to see or hear the proceedings until the host calls on them.

=== Main game ===
The main game consists of three rounds.

In each round, the booth is turned off and the contestant has 45 seconds to answer four true/false statements. Once time runs out or all four statements have been played, the booth is turned on so the suspects can see the statements and answers, and the host asks if they would have responded differently. The number of correct answers is then revealed, but not specifically which ones. If the contestant has all four correct, he/she wins the round; if none are correct, the suspects win. For any other outcome, the suspects are given a chance to change the responses they believe are incorrect, and can win the round by choosing correctly. If the suspects fail to change all answers missed by the contestant, neither side wins the round.

The winning side (if there is one) chooses two categories from a list of 12 to use in the final. If there is no winner, the two choices are carried over to the next round. In the case of no winner in the third round, the two sides alternate choosing categories until a total of six are in the final, with the contestant choosing first. The contestant's goal is to choose categories that will be easy for them, while the suspects make choices that they believe will be difficult for the contestant.

=== Final ===
The final is played for a jackpot that begins at £1,000 and increases by that amount for every game in which it goes unclaimed.

With the booth turned off, the contestant answers six true/false statements, one per category in the order they were selected during the main game. There is no time limit, but the contestant may not return to a statement or change a response after committing to it. After all six answers are locked in, the booth is turned on and the suspects give their individual opinions of how many responses are correct, but not specifically which ones. Each may, at their discretion, offer to help in changing the answers they think are incorrect, in exchange for a portion of the money at stake. The contestant may accept no more than one offer, but is not required to do so. If the contestant does accept an offer, that suspect leaves the booth and joins the contestant onstage, and the two discuss which answers should be changed. The contestant's decisions in this respect are final.

If all six answers are correct, the contestant wins the jackpot and (if applicable) splits it with the helper according to their agreement; otherwise, the contestant wins nothing. The contestant leaves the show, as does the helper (if applicable), and enough new suspects are introduced in the next game to bring the pool back up to four.

== Controversy ==
The first series was commissioned for a 30-episode run, and was originally due to be shown in autumn 2010. However, after 26 episodes had been filmed, reports surfaced of some onstage contestants being able to see a video screen (intended to be hidden from their view) that displayed the correct answers. Since these contestants could have used this screen as an unfair advantage, these 26 episodes were scrapped and re-filmed at 12 Yard Productions' expense. The series debut was pushed back to January 2011 as a result.

== Continuity ==
During the first four series, suspects remained on the show until they were either chosen to play onstage or selected as a helper in the final. From series 5, any suspect who is not selected in either manner after eight games is dismissed from the show.

== Records ==
=== Largest win ===
The largest amount of money won on the show was £21,000 by Lynn on episode 23 of Series 5 broadcast on 22 October 2014, beating the £19,000 by Meg (£10,000) and Michelle (£9,000) on episode 57 of series 4 broadcast on 14 March 2014. . On 14 March 2014, Meg asked for Michelle's help after answering all of the final round questions, but wasn't sure on one question relating to In The Night Garden and both being unsure about the Indian sweet dish.

Lynn achieved perfection on her own, despite the usual suspects choosing all of her final round categories, with all of the usual suspects ruling themselves out from helping her, and despite being far from confident on a question about Konrad Adenauer being Chancellor of West Germany. Michelle ("Shell" on her name badge) from Southend-on-Sea (nicknamed Southend-on-Sea Shell by Nick Knowles) achieved Perfection in the final round winning £14,000 answering correctly on the population size of Indonesia after refusing help from the "usual suspects" - this episode was finally aired (after a break between the episodes recorded) in Autumn 2014.

=== Achieving perfection ===
Perfection in all three rounds was first achieved in the first game of episode 57 by a contestant named Pat, though she did not achieve perfection in the final round and thus did not win the jackpot. The following game in the same episode saw contestant Niall become the first to achieve perfection in all three rounds and the final, winning £7,000.

In the episode broadcast on 15 January 2014, a contestant called Detta achieved perfection in all three rounds and in the final. However, she accepted help from a usual suspect, who persuaded her to change one of her answers, therefore denying her the prize money of £3,000.

In the episode broadcast on 1 February 2013, a contestant called Sharon achieved imperfection in the first round, answering 0 correctly and allowing the usual suspects to win automatically. However, in the third round, she achieved perfection, scoring 4 out of 4. In the final, none of the usual suspects chose to come down and Sharon won the prize fund, achieving perfection and winning £1,000.

=== Longest appearance ===
Aubrey and Jane of series 2 both hold the record for the longest run as a usual suspect before they were chosen. That record is 16 games. Under the current rules, this record cannot be broken, as players are allowed to take part in a maximum of eight games. Since this rule was introduced, six contestants – Ann, Emma, Phil, Beth, Sarah and Tracy – have played all of their eight games.

== Transmissions ==
Series	Start date	End date	Episodes
1	17 January 2011	25 February 2011	30
2	2 January 2012	10 February 2012	30
3	2 January 2013	21 August 2013	60
4	22 August 2013	19 March 2014	60
5	22 September 2014	30 March 2015	60
