= 5-Star Family Reunion =

BBC National Lottery game show

- Genre: Game show
- Presented by: Nick Knowles
- Country of origin: United Kingdom
- Original language: English
- No. of series: 2
- No. of episodes: 15

Production
- Running time: 50 minutes
- Production companies: 12 Yard; Boom Cymru

Original release
- Network: BBC One
- Release: 25 July 2015 – 15 October 2016

Related
- The National Lottery Draws

5-Star Family Reunion is a BBC National Lottery game show that was broadcast on BBC One from 25 July 2015 to 15 October 2016. The programme was hosted by Nick Knowles.

== Gameplay ==
The game featured one family of four trying to rejoin four members of their family that had emigrated and were competing to win a "five-star family reunion", a holiday for the eight team members.

== Round 1 ==
The first round involved teams alternating between quick-fire questions and multiple-choice questions; first, the overseas team answered five (four for series 2) triple choice questions. Correct answers gave them more time later in the round; the first ball on a Newton's cradle was raised with every correct answer. The Newton's cradle was then set in motion by releasing this ball and an elected member of the UK team answered quick-fire questions. The round ended once the ball at the opposite end of the Newton's cradle stopped passing through a red laser line. There were four categories, and each member had to play one category. Each had one 'power play', which raised the ball by another step. It could not be used if all five (four for series 2) questions had been answered correctly in a round. At maximum level, it took 66 seconds before the ball stopped passing through the laser line. This process repeated itself until all the categories had been used up. In the quick-fire parts, one correct answer won £1,000, two correct answers won £2,000 and three correct answers won £3,000; three further correct answers won £5,000 for the first two categories and £10,000 for the second two, meaning that there was £30,000 on offer. Once this process had repeated itself four times, the National Lottery draws were run.

== Final round ==
Knowles asked quick-fire questions to the UK team, with each team member in turn to answer them. They should answer five questions correctly before the Newton's cradle, started at its maximum setting, stopped passing through the laser line in order to win a holiday, billed as the titular "five-star family reunion".

== Transmissions ==
| Series | Episodes | Originally released | |
| Series | Episodes | First released | Last released |
|---|---|---|---|
| 1 | 8 | 25 July 2015 | 5 September 2015 |
| 1 | 8 | 30 July 2016 | |
| 2 | 7 | 23 July 2016 | 15 October 2016 |
