= Wildest Dreams (TV series) =

- Presented by: Nick Knowles
- Starring: James Honeyborne

Production
- Executive producer: Martyn Smith
- Running time: 60 minutes

Original release
- Network: BBC One
- Release: 22 July – 2 September 2009

Wildest Dreams is a British television programme presented by Nick Knowles and starring James Honeyborne. Seven episodes were first broadcast on BBC One in 2009.
