= Break the Safe =

- Genre: Game show
- Presented by: Nick Knowles
- Country of origin: United Kingdom
- Original language: English
- No. of series: 2
- No. of episodes: 15

Production
- Production location: BBC Pacific Quay
- Running time: 50 minutes
- Production companies: Thames Scotland; BBC Scotland

Original release
- Network: BBC One
- Release: 27 July 2013 – 30 August 2014

Related
- The National Lottery Draws

Break the Safe is a BBC National Lottery game show which was broadcast on BBC One from 27 July 2013 to 30 August 2014. It was hosted by Nick Knowles.

== Production ==
The first season in 2013 had eight episodes, while the second season in 2014 had seven. Filming of the first series took place in Glasgow in July 2013. The show's executive producers were Suzy Lamb, the head of entertainment at Thames Scotland, and Sarah Thompson-Woolley. According to the Glasgow Times, the first series was the "highest rated entertainment show of last summer" for BBC One, having received a viewership of over four million.

== Format ==
On each episode, three teams of two contestants apiece answer questions to accumulate prize money, which is placed into a large safe in the studio. The safe is secured with six locks, and a 36-minute countdown clock runs throughout the game. Four of the locks are opened during the course of the show; the last team remaining must open the other two in order to win the money, up to £100,000.

=== Round 1 ===
The teams stand at podiums that are split down the middle, allowing each contestant to be pushed forward or backward by pneumatics, and the three in the left positions are pushed back to start the round. The host asks 12 questions on the buzzer, each of which has two correct answers. Only the contestants in front may buzz-in; once a contestant does so, they must give one answer and their partner in back must then give the other. If both answers are correct, the team wins £1,000; if not, the host begins re-reading the question and either of the other teams may buzz-in. A second miss results in the question being discarded. Contestants may buzz-in at any time, but must answer based only on whatever information the host has read to that point.

After the 12 questions have been asked, the contestants' positions are reversed and the host asks a second set of 12 questions worth £2,000 each. The round ends after this set, the lowest-scoring team is eliminated with no winnings, and the totals of the remaining two teams are put into the safe. A maximum of £36,000 can be accumulated in this round by the two teams that advance.

=== Round 2 ===
The scores are reset to zero, and each team chooses one of its members to be pushed back. The host asks one question to each team, starting with the one that brought less money through from Round 1. After hearing a question, the teammate in front may either answer it immediately, or pass it to their partner for double value without being able to see if the partner knows the answer.

Three pairs of questions are played, worth £2,000/£4,000, £4,000/£8,000, and £6,000/£12,000. The team members' positions are reversed for the second pair, while each team again chooses who will move forward or back for the third.

After all six questions have been asked, the team with the lower total is eliminated with no winnings, and the higher-scoring team's money is added to the safe. A team can accumulate up to £24,000 in this round. The Thunderball draw is then held.

=== Round 3 ===
The team is asked four questions, but each member may only answer two of them. Before each question, the host names a category and the team decides who will answer. Each correct answer allows the team to either add £10,000 to the safe or expand their "window of opportunity" to open it by one second. The team starts with a window of one second; depending on the number of correct answers and extra seconds taken, it can become as long as five seconds. The team can accumulate up to £40,000 in this round by answering every question correctly and taking the money on each.

=== Round 4 ===
Each teammate is given a button that controls one of the two still-closed locks on the safe, and a partition is placed between them to prevent any communication. When the countdown clock reaches 30 seconds, it disappears from the team's view. Both teammates must continue the countdown in their heads; once they believe it has reached zero, they must push their buttons within the length of their window of opportunity to open the locks. The National Lottery draw is held after both contestants have pushed their buttons.

Following the draw, the results are revealed. If both buttons were pushed within the window, the team wins all the money in the safe. The team wins half the money if one button was pushed in time, or nothing at all if both buttons were pushed too early or too late.

During the second series, the countdown clock was displayed on-screen during the final 30 seconds for the benefit of home viewers, along with a prompt indicating when the safe could be opened.

== Transmissions ==
Series	Start date	End date	Episodes
1	27 July 2013	14 September 2013	8
2	28 June 2014	30 August 2014	7
