= Talkback Thames =

British television production company

- Logo used since 2025
- Type: Subsidiary
- Predecessor: Talkback Productions; Thames Television; Thames
- Founded: 10 February 2003; 23 years ago (original); 1 January 2025; 20 months ago (relaunch)
- Defunct: 1 January 2012; 14 years ago (original)
- Fate: Split into successor brands (original)
- Headquarters: London, England, United Kingdom
- Key people: Charlie Irwin (MD)
- Parent: Fremantle UK
- Website: www.talkbackthames.com

Talkback Thames is a British television production company, a division of Fremantle, part of the RTL Group, which in turn is owned by Bertelsmann. It was formed by the merger of Talkback Productions and Thames Television. This merger was arranged in February 2003 and reversed in January 2012. It was arranged again in January 2025, after Fremantle UK merged two of its production labels Thames and Talkback.

Despite the two companies merging, their respective logos were used separately at the end of productions: Thames was used for drama and entertainment shows, and Talkback was used for comedy and factual shows. In November 2005 however, a new logo was introduced for Talkback Thames, with all productions being produced under that label starting in the following year, when the two brands ceased to be used separately.

The company also included, as subsidiaries, several other production companies owned by Fremantle, including the UK arm of Reg Grundy Productions; comedy specialists Alomo Productions and William G. Stewart's company Regent Productions.

The CEO of Talkback Thames was Sara Geater, who took up the post in October 2010, replacing Lorraine Heggessey, who had been CEO of Talkback Thames from 2005 to 2010. She in turn, replaced Peter Fincham, who had been CEO of Talkback from 1986 to 2003 and then of Talkback Thames from 2003. Fincham left to take over Heggessey's previous job as Controller of BBC One.

In September 2024, it was announced that Talkback would once again merge with Thames to form a new iteration of Talkback Thames to be led by MD Charlie Irwin.

== Reorganisation ==
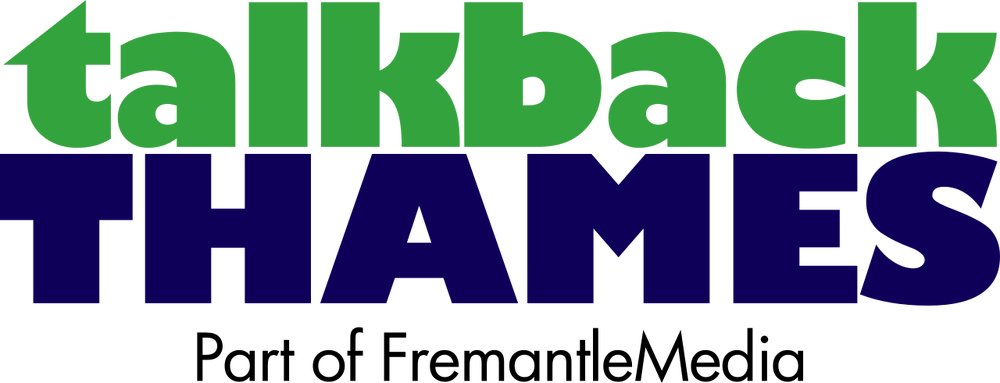
Former logo, used from 2005 to 2011

In November 2011, it was announced that, from 1 January 2012, the Talkback Thames brand would be split into four different labels within the newly created FremantleMedia UK production arm:

- Boundless for factual shows.
- Retort for scripted comedy.
- Talkback for comedy entertainment.
- Thames for entertainment shows.

The splitting of Talkback Thames happened as planned on New Year's Day, 1 January 2012.

== Productions ==
- All Star Family Fortunes for ITV.
- The Apprentice – Originally, a Talkback production for BBC One.
- As the Bell Rings for Disney Channel.
- The Bill – Originally, a Thames production for ITV.
- Bo' Selecta! – Originally, a Talkback production for Channel 4.
- Britain's Got Talent in association with Syco Entertainment for ITV.
- Celebrity Juice for ITV2.
- Da Ali G Show – Originally, a Talkback production for Channel 4.
- Dale's Supermarket Sweep for ITV. – Originally produced by Talbot Television, Central, Fremantle Productions (UK), Grundy and Carlton.
- Escape to the Country – Originally, a Talkback production for BBC Two.
- Family Affairs – Originally, a Thames production for Channel 5.
- Grand Designs – Originally, a Talkback production for Channel 4.
- Grease is the Word in association with Syco Entertainment for ITV.
- Great British Railway Journeys for BBC Two.
- Green Wing for Channel 4.
- Hole in the Wall for BBC One.
- How Clean Is Your House? – Originally, a Talkback production for Channel 4.
- The IT Crowd for Channel 4.
- The King Is Dead for BBC Three.
- Manhunt – Solving Britain's Crimes for ITV.
- Monday Monday – Comedy drama for ITV.
- Never Mind the Buzzcocks – Originally, a Talkback production for BBC Two.
- Open House with Gloria Hunniford – Originally, a Thames production for Channel 5.
- PhoneShop for E4.
- PokerFace in association with Gallowgate for ITV.
- Pop Idol – Originally, a Thames production in association with 19 Entertainment for ITV.
- The Price Is Right for ITV – Originally produced by Central, Yorkshire, Talbot Television, Fremantle Productions (UK) and Grundy.
- Property Ladder – Originally, a Talkback production for Channel 4.
- QI – Originally, a Talkback production in association with Quite Interesting Limited for BBC Four, BBC One and BBC Two.
- Richard Bacon's Beer & Pizza Club for ITV4.
- The Rob Brydon Show for BBC Two.
- The Sharon Osbourne Show for ITV.
- Thank God, You're Here! for ITV.
- They Think It's All Over? – Originally, a Talkback production for BBC One.
- Wish You Were Here...?/Do You Still Wish You Were Here...? – Originally, a Thames production for ITV.
- The X Factor in association with Syco Entertainment for ITV.
