= Talkback (production company) =

British television production company

Talkback Productions
- Final logo, used from 2018 to 2025
- Type: Subsidiary
- Predecessor: Talkback Thames (first incarnation)
- Founded: 1981; 45 years ago (original); 1 January 2012; 14 years ago (relaunch)
- Founders: Mel Smith; Griff Rhys Jones
- Defunct: 9 June 2006; 20 years ago (original); 1 January 2025; 19 months ago (relaunch)
- Fate: Merged with Thames to form Talkback Thames
- Successor: Talkback Thames (second incarnation)
- Headquarters: London, England
- Parent: Fremantle (2000–2025)

Talkback Productions, commonly simplified to just Talkback (formerly known as Talkback-UK from 2003 to 2006), was a British television production company established in 1981 by comedy duo Mel Smith and Griff Rhys Jones.

== History ==
Talkback was sold to Pearson Television in 2000. The company merged with Thames Television in 2003 and the combined entity was renamed Talkback Thames. Despite the merger, Talkback continued as a separate entity and its own logo to be used at the end of the label's comedy and factual productions until 2006. On 1 January 2012, Talkback Thames was split into four separate production companies; Boundless, Retort, Talkback and Thames.

On 16 September 2024, it was announced that Talkback would be merged again with Thames to re-form Talkback Thames following the managing director Jonno Richards exiting Talkback.

== Productions ==
- The 11 O'Clock Show (Channel 4, 1998–2000)
- Alan Carr's Epic Gameshow (ITV, 2020–2022)
- Alas Smith and Jones (BBC One & BBC Two, 1991–1998; Sketchbook: BBC One, 2006)
- The Armando Iannucci Shows (Channel 4, 2001)
- Bernard and the Genie (BBC One, 1991)
- Big Train (BBC Two, 1998–2002)
- Bonjour la Classe (BBC One, 1993)
- Brass Eye (Channel 4, 1997–2001)
- Celebrity Juice (ITV2, 2008–2022)
- Da Ali G Show (Channel 4, 2000–2004; HBO, 2003–2004)
- The Day Today (BBC Two, 1994)
- Demob (ITV, 1993)
- Distraction (Channel 4, 2003–2004)
- Friends and Crocodiles (BBC One, 2006)
- Gash (Channel 4, 2003)
- Gideon's Daughter (BBC One, 2006)
- Green Wing (Channel 4, 2004–2007)
- Hippies (BBC Two, 1999)
- House Doctor (Channel 5, 1998–2003)
- I'm Alan Partridge (BBC Two, 1997–2002)
- In a Land of Plenty (BBC Two, 2000)
- Jam (Channel 4, 2000)
- Jamie's Kitchen (Channel 4, 2002)
- Jon Richardson: Ultimate Worrier (Dave, 2018–2019)
- The Keith & Paddy Picture Show (ITV, 2017–2018)
- The Keith Lemon Sketch Show (ITV2, 2015–2016)
- Keith Lemon's LemonAid (ITV, 2012)
- Knowing Me, Knowing You... with Alan Partridge (BBC Two, 1994–1995)
- Lemon La Vida Loca (ITV2, 2012–2013)
- Look Around You (BBC Two, 2002–2005)
- Los Dos Bros (Channel 4, 2001)
- The Lost Prince (BBC One, 2003)
- Meet Ricky Gervais (Channel 4, 2000)
- Monkey Dust (BBC Three, 2003–2005)
- Murder Most Horrid (BBC Two, 1991–1999)
- Nathan Barley (Channel 4, 2005)
- Never Mind the Buzzcocks (BBC Two, 1996–2015; Sky Max, 2021–2025)
- Perfect Strangers (BBC Two, 2001)
- QI (BBC Four, 2003–2008; BBC Two, 2003–2008 & 2011–present; BBC One, 2009–2011)
- The Sex Inspectors (Channel 4, 2004)
- Shooting the Past (BBC Two, 1999)
- Shoreditch Twat (Channel 4, 2002)
- Smack the Pony (Channel 4, 1999–2003)
- Sweat the Small Stuff (BBC Three, 2013–2015)
- Sword of Honour (Channel 4, 2001)
- They Think It's All Over (BBC One, 1995–2006)
- Through the Keyhole (ITV, 2013–2019)
- Too Hot to Handle (Netflix, 2020–2024)
- Virtually Famous (E4, 2014–2017)
- Would Like to Meet (BBC Two, 2001–2004)
- Your Face or Mine? (E4, 2002–2003; Comedy Central, 2017–2019)

== See also ==
- List of television production companies
- Talkback Thames
