= Thames (production company) =

British television production company

- Final logo, used from 2018 to 2025
- Company type: Subsidiary
- Predecessor: Talkback Thames (first incarnation)
- Founded: 1 January 2012; 13 years ago
- Defunct: 1 January 2025; 10 months ago
- Fate: Merged with Talkback to form Talkback Thames
- Successor: Talkback Thames (second incarnation)
- Headquarters: London, England
- Key people: Amelia Brown (MD)
- Parent: Fremantle (2012–2025)

Thames was a British television production company that was established on 1 January 2012. The name Thames was revived from Thames Television after being inactive for nearly six years.

On 23 November 2011, it was announced that Talkback Thames would split into four separate production companies, which are Boundless, Retort, Talkback and Thames.

On 16 September 2024, it was announced that Thames would be merged with Talkback again to revive Talkback Thames. The merger was completed on 1 January 2025, with all of the company's productions being produced under the Talkback Thames name.

== Productions ==
- 1001 Things You Should Know – A Thames Scotland production for Channel 4.
- All Star Family Fortunes – Formerly, a Talkback Thames production for ITV.
- Bang on the Money – A Thames production for ITV.
- Blankety Blank – A Thames production for ITV.
- Blockbusters – A Thames production for Challenge (2012) and later Comedy Central (2019).
- Break the Safe – A Thames Scotland production in association with BBC Scotland for BBC One.
- Britain's Got Talent – A Thames production in association with Syco Entertainment for ITV.
- Confetti - A Thames production for Facebook Watch.
- Game of Talents – A Thames production for ITV.
- I Can See Your Voice – A Thames and Naked production for BBC One.
- Let's Get Gold! – A Thames production in association with Superhero TV for ITV.
- Rebound! – A Thames production for ITV.
- Supermarket Sweep - A Thames production for ITV (2019).
- Take Me Out – Formerly, a Talkback Thames production for ITV.
- That Dog Can Dance! – A Thames production in association with SYCOtv for ITV.
- The Greatest Dancer – A Thames production in association with SYCO Entertainment for BBC One.
- The Price Is Right – A Thames production for Channel 4 (2017).
- The X Factor – A Thames production in association with SYCO Entertainment for ITV.
- Too Hot to Handle – A Thames and Talkback production for Netflix.
