= List of DIY SOS episodes =

This is a list of episodes of the BBC One show DIY SOS And DIY SOS The Big Build. The first episode aired on BBC One on 7 October 1999 and it has run for 242 episodes over 32 series.

== Series overview ==
Series	Episodes	Originally released	
Series	Episodes	First released	Last released
1	6	7 October 1999	18 November 1999
2	7	7 March 2000	25 April 2000
3	9	18 October 2000	13 December 2000
4	8	12 June 2001	31 July 2001
5	8	31 January 2002	21 March 2002
6	9	20 June 2002	29 August 2002
7	8	9 January 2003	6 March 2003
8	8	10 July 2003	28 August 2003
9	8	15 January 2004	10 March 2004
10	6	19 May 2004	19 August 2004
11	8	16 March 2005	11 May 2005
12	8	28 July 2005	26 September 2005
13	10	1 May 2006	17 July 2006
14	8	8 November 2006	2 March 2007
15	8	13 July 2007	19 November 2007
16	7	27 June 2008	15 August 2008
17	8	22 August 2008	10 October 2008
18	6	9 April 2009	14 May 2009
19	7	28 April 2010	16 June 2010
20	2	15 April 2010	1 July 2010
21	4	26 August 2010	26 January 2011
22	6	13 April 2011	16 August 2011
23	10	10 January 2012	15 October 2013
24	6	22 October 2013	30 May 2014
25	6	12 May 2014	21 October 2014
26	9	18 December 2014	17 December 2015
27	10	17 February 2016	29 March 2017
28	6	8 June 2017	15 November 2017
29	6	4 January 2018	17 January 2019
30	7	3 April 2019	11 December 2019
31	6	19 November 2020	17 May 2022
32	5	10 May 2022	14 June 2022
34	5	3 October 2025	13 November 2025

== Episodes ==
=== Series 1 ===
No.	Title	Broadcast
1.1	(Banbury)	7 October 1999
Rescue a daughter's bedroom
1.2	(Devon)	14 October 1999
Rescue a kitchen
1.3	(Durham)	21 October 1999
Convert a shell into a playroom
1.4	(Market Drayton)	4 November 1999
Fit a front door into a hole too small for it
1.5	(Wakefield)	11 November 1999
Complete an unfinished kitchen
1.6	(York)	18 November 1999
Rescue a piano teacher's room in her farmhouse, ruined by her husband's efforts

=== Series 2 ===
No.	Title	Broadcast
2.1	(Plymouth)	7 March 2000
Rescue a kitchen
2.2	(Heme Bay)	14 March 2000
Rescue an entire house
2.3	(Devon)	21 March 2000
Rebuild a fire and flood damaged kitchen
2.4	(Walsall)	28 March 2000
Finish a hallway renovation begun ten years previously
2.5	(Bolton)	4 April 2000
Rescue a living and dining room
2.6	(Runcorn)	18 April 2000
Finishing touches to the walls of a house
2.7	(Yorkshire)	25 April 2000
Rescue the attempted conversion of recreation room into a community hall, in a fire station

=== Series 3 ===
No.	Title	Broadcast
3.1		18 October 2000
Complete a bathroom project, which had to stop due to the home owner's illness with breast cancer. Filmed as part of Breast Cancer Awareness Month
3.2	(Abergavenny)	25 October 2000
Finish the conversion of a rat infested bathroom into a bedroom.
3.3		1 November 2000
Rescue a kitchen
3.4		8 November 2000
Repair a canal barge
3.5	(Edinburgh)	15 November 2000
Rescue an apartment
3.6		22 November 2000
Build a bathroom
3.7		29 November 2000
(generic listing)
3.8		13 December 2000
Rescue a kitchen
3.9		20 December 2000
A behind-the-scenes look at the show

=== Series 4 ===
No.	Title	Broadcast
4.1	(Cardiff)	12 June 2001
Rescue a kitchen.
4.2	(Llandudno)	19 June 2001
Rescue a bathroom and create a living room
4.3		26 June 2001
Fix a staircase and rescue a bathroom.
4.4	(Pontefract)	3 July 2001
Rescue a living room
4.5	(Surrey)	10 July 2001
Convert a garage into a playroom
4.6	(Nottingham)	17 July 2001
Create an Oriental themed living room, breakfast room and garden for Claire
4.7	(Wirral)	24 July 2001
Rescue Barbara's bedroom loft conversion
4.8	(Snowdonia)	31 July 2001
Rescue Sarah and Rhys's farmhouse, which had been reduced to a shell, leaving the couple and their children living in a caravan.

=== Series 5 ===
No.	Title	Broadcast
5.1	Manchester	31 January 2002
Renovate a kitchen.
5.2		7 February 2002
Renovate a conservatory and dining-room.
5.3	(Weston-super-Mare)	14 February 2002
Rescue a project experiencing building regulations difficulties
5.4		21 February 2002
Lowri: Rescue an attempted playroom build. Nick: Renovate a school's classroom in a converted toilet block.
5.5	(South Yorkshire)	28 February 2002
Rescue a kitchen.
5.6		7 March 2002
Lowri: Rescue a kitchen Nick: Convert a post office storeroom into a dust-free play area.
5.7	(Stockton-on-Tees)	14 March 2002
Assist a couple being driven apart by a project.
5.8	(Suffolk)	21 March 2002
Rescue a family's project

=== Series 6 ===
No.	Title	Broadcast
6.1	ChristChurch	20 June 2002
Rescue a kitchen conversion.
6.2	(Preston)	27 June 2002
Complete a bathroom.
6.3	Birmingham	4 July 2002
Rescue a bedroom project waylaid by an accident.
6.4	(Manchester)	11 July 2002
Rescue a converted shop with subsidence.
6.5	Wrexham	18 July 2002
Rescue a kitchen.
6.6	Birkenhead	25 July 2002
Rescue a sitting room in time for a wedding.
6.7		15 August 2002
A look back over the last three years of shows.
6.8		22 August 2002
Rescue a sitting room in time for a wedding.
6.9	(Slough)	29 August 2002
Complete an unusual house.

=== Series 7 ===
No.	Title	Broadcast
7.1	Bristol	9 January 2003
Rescue a house modernisation
7.2	(Lewes)	16 January 2003
Complete an extension halted after a death.
7.3	Aldershot	23 January 2003
Rescue ten-year-old Dan's "House of Horrors"
7.4	Walsall	30 January 2003
Lowri: Rescue a bedroom. Nick: Work on an unusual kitchen.
7.5	Blackpool	6 February 2003
Assist foster parents whose with special needs children.
7.6	Retford	13 February 2003
Finish the conversion of a coal shed into Jason's bedroom
7.7	(Halifax)	20 February 2003
Finish Brian's bathroom.
7.8	(Bradford)	6 March 2003
Assist Susan and Wayne, whose relationship is under strain.

=== Series 8 ===
No.	Title	Broadcast
8.1	(Suffolk)	10 July 2003
Finish a cottage
8.2	(Bristol)	17 July 2003
Complete Carolyn and Adrian's house
8.3		24 July 2003
Complete Cherie and Jon's master bedroom project, stalled after Jon injured his shoulder
8.4	Bath	31 July 2003
Rescue Jo and Julian's bathroom, begun by Julian two years previously.
8.5	(Addlestone Surrey)	7 August 2003
Knowles: rescue a decorating job Lowri: Rescue a room
8.6	Nottingham	14 August 2003
Two bathroom projects, Lowri for Mary, Knowles for Janet (Nottingham)
8.7	Brixton	21 August 2003
Rescue Vera and Doug's house, tinkered with by Doug for 17 years
8.8	Derby	28 August 2003
Rescue a woman's house from her Greek partner's DIY efforts

=== Series 9 ===
No.	Title	Broadcast
9.1	(Cardiff)	15 January 2004
Rescue a lounge.
9.2	(Stratford-upon-Avon)	22 January 2004
Finish a loft bedroom conversion.
9.3	(Cheltenham)	29 January 2004
Build a kitchen from scratch.
9.4	(Pembrokeshire)	5 February 2004
Complete a renovation begun 25 years previously
9.5	Caernarfon	12 February 2004
Complete Thomas and Rachel's conversion of a disused shop into a house, begun by Thomas
9.6	Woking	19 February 2004
Complete the upgrading of Daniel's former railway cottage
9.7	(Cheltenham)	26 February 2004
Build Debbie's handmade kitchen from scratch
9.8	(Derby)	10 March 2004
Restore a Victorian terraced house, latterly used as bedsits

=== Series 10 ===
No.	Title	Broadcast
10.1	(Stockport)	15 July 2004
Assist decorating tutor Ian renovate his new home
10.2	West Midlands	22 July 2004
Revamp the bedroom of 14-year-old Andrew, son of widowed Maggie
10.3	(Sussex)	29 July 2004
Renovate the kitchen of recent divorcee Chris, who is hampered by a back injury
10.4	(Farnborough Hampshire)	5 August 2004
Create a bedroom for widow Susie, who has been sharing her 14-year-old daughter's bedroom for a decade.
10.5	(Bristol)	12 August 2004
Complete David and Sara's self-build home, a project hampered by planning issues, builder walkouts and money troubles.
10.6	Cardiff	19 August 2004
Finish the improvements to Scott and Gemma's house, made necessary after Gemma suffered a brain tumour, the project having been started by Scott himself.

=== Series 11 ===
No.	Title	Broadcast
11.1	(Glasgow)	16 March 2005
Finish Margaret's loft conversion
11.2	(Torquay)	23 March 2005
Complete Lesley and Mark's open plan living area
11.3	(Fleetwood)	6 April 2005
Complete a bedroom loft conversion for the son of an oil rig worker
11.4	Preston	13 April 2005
Rescue Angela and Steve's living room, left with a sagging ceiling and collapsed chimney breast by builder Steve's own efforts
11.5	(Wales)	20 April 2005
Rescue Laurence's self-build project, begun 20 years ago but recently struck by fire.
11.6	Cumbernauld	27 April 2005
Finish a lounge in a couple's new home.
11.7	(Manchester)	4 May 2005
Complete the conversion of Keith and Torsten's three storey house from bedsits back into one single home.
11.8	(Leeds)	11 May 2005
Finish French expat Odile's kitchen

=== Series 12 ===
No.	Title	Broadcast
12.1	(Cheltenham)	28 July 2005
Renovate the clubhouse of a community centre's football team
12.2	(Pembrokeshire)	4 August 2005
Build a separate play area for Merrilee and Chris's two-year-old daughter Mia, made necessary due to the lack of space caused by the equipment required to treat her cystic fibrosis.
12.3	Newbury	11 August 2005
Complete Elsie and Duncan's kitchen extension. kitchen extensions
12.4	(Northfleet Kent)	18 August 2005
Finish the modernisation of Kate and Craig's 1930's lounge diner, work on their new house having stalled due to money issues
12.5	Hartlepool	25 August 2005
Complete the bathroom in Daniel and Eve's large house, undergoing conversion back from subdivision into flats
12.6	Rushden	12 September 2005
Build a dining room for single mother Sarah
12.7	(Tisbury)	19 September 2005
Fit a kitchen
12.8	(Bath)	26 September 2005
Create an education centre at Bath City Farm from a shell of a building, assisted by volunteers from the Royal Navy

=== Series 13 ===
No.	Title	Broadcast
13.1	Rushden	1 May 2006
13.2	Eastbourne	8 May 2006
13.3	Bolsover	15 May 2006
Assisting a couple to convert a difficult loft space into a room for their young son.
13.4	Cleethorpes	22 May 2006
Complete the renovation of a kitchen in Vanessa's Victorian house.
13.5	Gloucester	29 May 2006
Assist the mother of 16-year-old Amy and 12-year-old Nick's efforts at DIY.
13.6	Yarm	5 June 2006
Finish the bathroom of Shahzad and Waheeda's house.
13.7	Norfolk	28 June 2006
Assist a conversion of a garage into a room for Carl and Michelle's six-year-old son.
13.8	Warrington	3 July 2006
Assist a young family.
13.9	South Wales	10 July 2006
Create a county-style lounge in Angie and Paul's farmhouse.
13.10	Ipswich	17 July 2006
Assist in the expansion of Jason and Toni's three bedroom house.

=== Series 14 ===
No.	Title	Broadcast
14.1	Fishguard	20 April 2007
Renovate the bedroom and en-suite bathroom for Maria and Barrie; they had been making slow progress on their house ever since the birth of their quadruplets, four and a half years previously.
14.2	Swindon	22 November 2006
14.3	Crawley	29 November 2006
Assist in the renovation of a kitchen diner for brothers Daniel and Adam.
14.4	Navenby	6 December 2006
Create a multi-functional room with an eco-friendly heating system for John and Maaike in their house located inside a former telephone exchange; they had begun renovations themselves, but work had stopped after Maaike was diagnosed with osteonecrosis in 2003.
14.5	Essex	13 December 2006
Assist in the renovation of a lounge diner for paramedic Tina.
14.6	Manchester	26 February 2007
Remedy a kitchen extension for Kevin, whose efforts to perform it himself had failed.
14.7	Pembroke Dock	8 January 2007
Extend the bathroom in Adrian and Rachel's house; having bought a run down property to renovate themselves, their family grew faster than expected.
14.8	Clevedon	2 March 2007
Complete an extension to create a media lounge for Stuart and his three boys; having begun the project himself, work stopped at the shell stage, after the death of his wife Hilary.

=== Series 15 ===
No.	Title	Broadcast
15.1	Southampton	13 July 2007
Completion of an open plan lounge and diner for Sarah, Paul and daughter Caitlin; Paul had begun the work but after suffering kidney failure three years previously, the room had remained as a bare brick room.
15.2	Ipswich	20 July 2007
Completion of a kitchen diner for single mother-of-two Yvette; had begun the work herself but had suffered a back complaint for most of it, leaving the room unfinished and without electricity.
15.3	Liverpool	27 July 2007
Complete the conversion of Elisa and Andy's garage into a playroom for their daughter Molly, who has Downs Syndrome; they had begun the project six years previously but made little progress.
15.4	Nottingham	3 August 2007
Complete a kitchen diner for Phil's family, whose son has the condition PKU; Phil had done some work on the rest of the house, but found the kitchen too daunting.
15.5	Plymouth	21 August 2007
Complete the two bedroom extension for Kevin and Tracey; having begun the project themselves for daughters Kirsty and Imogen, they suffered the loss of Imogen at fifteen months, and had since had another baby, David, all of which had impacted on the project schedule, which had also gone over budget.
15.6	Rossendale	17 August 2007 (NI)
Complete the lounge of Craig and Vicky's house, the last room of the couple's renovations, which had experienced problems and come to a halt after the money ran out; completion would allow the couple to move out of their temporary home with Vicky's mum.
15.7	Chelmsford	24 August 2007
Completion of Karen's kitchen, she had been unable to complete the work after a difficult year, impacting her and her children.
15.8	Epsom	19 September 2007
Rendering assistance to Dee, who puts her family first while also holding down a high pressure job.

=== Series 16 ===
No.	Title	Broadcast
16.1	Ramsgate	5 November 2007
Create a Victorian reception room for Sharon and Steve so they can renew their wedding vows in it.
16.2	Nottingham	19 November 2007
Complete a bathroom extension for Mark and Vicky, made necessary by their eight-year-old son's brain tumour, leading him to use a wheelchair; they had begun the work themselves, but a flood caused by a burst water pipe set the project back.
16.3	Swansea	27 June 2008
Completion of a children's bedroom and play area for the Harris family; the project having been begun by the family themselves, but was set back after a leaking sewer flooded the house.
16.4	Stoke-on-Trent	1 August 2008
Finish an open-plan kitchen-diner for the Harris family, made necessary by their youngest daughter's medical condition which means she cannot be left unattended; the family had begun the project themselves, but work had not progressed beyond knowing down the dividing wall.
16.5	Surrey	8 August 2008
Convert a bachelor's river boat into a more suitable family friendly environment, allowing his girlfriend who lives two hours away to move in.
16.6	Willenhall	15 August 2008
Complete the conversion of a garage into a kitchen for Paul and Pauline, made necessary by their growing family, now numbering six children including a daughter with Down syndrome and twins with learning difficulties; they had begun the project themselves, but ran out of money.

=== Series 17 ===
No.	Title	Broadcast
17.1	Lymington	22 August 2008
Complete an open plan kitchen for Carrie and Rob's house, their failed efforts to do it themselves having resulted in Carrie moving in with her mother.
17.2	Sheffield	29 August 2008
Complete the renovation of a bedroom for Stuart and Shelley; Shelley having removed an internal wall while Stuart was in hospital three years earlier
17.3	Wigan	5 September 2008
Completion of Caroline and Mike's living room, Mike having been told he must stop the project due to recent heart surgery.
17.4	Essex	12 September 2008
Convert Kerry and Jacquie's garage into a downstairs bathroom, made necessary after the former window cleaner became a wheelchair user after falling 25 feet from a ladder.
17.5	Gosport	19 September 2008
Complete a glamour themed lounge for Cathy, now a single parent after her partner died in a freak accident in the middle of renovating the house.
17.6	Kent	26 September 2008
Complete a kitchen for Neil and Leslie, whose front wall had collapsed after Neil had mistakenly dug too far while building an extension, resulting in Leslie and their children having to move out while he rebuiltl four walls
17.7	Romford	3 October 2008
Convert a loft for Sharon, building a kitchen, bathroom and bedroom to allow her 17-year-old autistic son Perry a degree of independence; the project had been begun by the family, with Perry not having had his own bedroom before.
17.8	West Bromwich	10 October 2008
Create an Indonesian-themed lounge for Debbie and her 8-year-old son, Tyler; Debbie having a heart condition which prevents her doing the work herself.

=== Series 18 ===
No.	Title	Broadcast
18.1	Bridgwater	9 April 2009
Recovery of the DIY project begun by David, an Iraq war veteran medically discharged and lacking the funds to pay for a professional
18.2	Frimley	16 April 2009
Completion of the double-storey extension of Lisa and Andy's home, who also have a son, Jordan; begun by Andy two years previously, work had to be stopped after Lisa's diagnosis of brain cancer.
18.3	Bowled Over in Oxford	23 April 2009
Completion of a cricket themed kitchen/diner/lounge area in the Barker family's bungalow; begun by the family themselves three years previously the project had been beset by a series of disasters.
18.4	Lounging in Bradford	30 April 2009
Renovation of the lounge of Emma's house; having bought a run down property, the original plan of Emma and her father doing it up themselves had to be abandoned due to injuries he suffered in a motorbike accident. Completion of the project allows Emma and nine-year-old son to move out of her parents home into the property.
18.5	Caravanning in Caersws	7 May 2009
Renovate a kitchen/lounge of Gary and Andrea's historic but run down cottage; plans to do it themselves had been thwarted by various problems over the previous seven years, leaving them living in an adjacent caravan.
18.6	Elping out in Essex	14 May 2009
Complete a lounge and diner for the Curry family who have a two-year-old son; their own efforts at performing a simple renovation had gone wrong over the course of two years.

=== Series 19 ===
No.	Title	Broadcast
19.1	Worktop Woes in Watford	28 April 2010
Renovation of Lucy and Mario's kitchen and dining area, required to be medically clean as a result of their daughters brain tumour. The couple had previously been renovating the house themselves.
19.2	A Little Luxury in Leamington	5 May 2010
Renovation of single-parent Kate's bathroom, her house already undergoing an extension.
19.3	A Home for Howards (Kent)	19 May 2010
Completion of the kitchen and sitting room in the Howard family's Victorian cottage, which they had originally attempted to renovate themselves.
19.4	Grandad's Timewarp (Kingston upon Thames)	31 May 2010
Improvement to Ray and Linda's house, grandparents and guardians to fourteen-year-old twins Nathan and Chelsea; conversion of a toy room into a dining room, and renovation of a bedroom for Chelsea and the garden.
19.5	Three Rooms for Three Daughters (Edmonton)	16 July 2010
Renovation of three bedrooms for Cristina, Daniella and Sophia, daughters of Stephen and Fillippa; Stephen having failed to take on the job of completing an extension and renovation after falling out with the builder.
19.6	Liz's Bedroom Bedlam (Norfolk)	23 July 2010
A new bedroom and bathroom for Liz and Neil's cottage; made necessary after Neil has been forced to walk with crutches due to back operations.
19.7	Compilation	30 July 2010
Various clips from the previous series.

=== Original Special Episodes ===
No.	Title	Broadcast
	DIY SOS Summer Special 2000	13 September 2000
A 50-minute special, tackling two projects with the assistance of locals: Ebbw Vale: Convert a derelict building into a rehearsal space for a theatre group. Manchester: Rescue the attempted renovation of Fifth Stalybridge Cub Scout Group's scout hut
No.	Title	Broadcast
	DIY SOS Live	4 May 2001
In a half hour episode, Nick Knowles's crew begins one project, while the choice of a second project for Lowri Turner's team to complete is put to the public vote, from a choice of three.
	DIY SOS Live	6 May 2001
In a ten-minute episode, both projects continue.
	DIY SOS Live	7 May 2001
An hour long special, for the completion of the projects
No.	Title	Broadcast
	DIY SOS Christmas Special	21 December 2002
Devon: Convert a primary school headmaster's house into a resource centre. London: Renovate a meeting hall for an old people's Christmas lunch.
	Hola DIY SOS	1 January 2003
An hour long special. Lowri: rescue expat couple Mike and Joy's retirement home plans. Nick: convert a goat shed into a house
No.	Title	Broadcast
	DIY SOS Tour de Force	8 January 2004
Hour long special rescuing ex-pat projects, including the bedroom conversion of a 15th-century farmhouse's grain store, and the child bedroom conversion of an old kitchen
No.	Title	Broadcast
	DIY SOS The Italian Job	8 July 2004
An hour long special, assisting expats in Italy. Lake Como: Extend John and Kay's house Tolentino: Create a nursery for Ben and Lisa
No.	Title	Broadcast
16.7	Floods Special	27 December 2007
Renovation of a foster family's home and a local pub in Toll Bar, which were damaged in the June floods.
No.	Title	Broadcast
	The Big Build	10 December 2009

=== Big Build Special Episodes ===
No.	Title	Broadcast
n/a ^{A}	The Big Build Children in Need Special - Liverpool	10 November 2011
Refurbishment of the Norris Green Youth Centre.
n/a ^{B}	The Big Build Children in Need Special - Edinburgh	14 November 2012
Renovation of the children's respite centre, The Yard.
n/a ^{C}	Million Pound Build for Children in Need	13 November 2013
The construction from scratch of a centre and two-and-a-half acre grounds for the children's charity Little Miracles
26.7	Homes for Veterans (part 1)	14 October 2015
See 28.5
26.8	Homes for Veterans (part 2)	21 October 2015
See 28.5
Remodelling of a street in Manchester to provide accommodation and career re-training facilities for two war veterans who fought in Iraq and Afghanistan and are now suffering from post traumatic stress disorder (PTSD); other veterans will also benefit from the facilities on a day visit basis.
27.5	DIY SOS at Great Ormond Street Hospital	10 November 2016
Nick Knowles and the team join forces with two world-famous British institutions, Great Ormond Street Hospital for Children and the Royal Horticultural Society's Chelsea Flower Show, to transport Chris Beardshaw's gold medal-winning garden across London, crane it over buildings and rebuild it on the hospital's roof. For hundreds of families, Great Ormond Street Hospital has become a second home. For parents that means being by their child's bedside around the clock, and for children, it results in a constant treadmill of appointments and treatments. When Rosie was just two years old, her heart began to fail. Great Ormond Street Hospital doctors diagnosed her with restrictive cardiomyopathy, an extremely rare condition affecting just one in a million children, where the heart is too weak to pump blood. Rosie has had an operation to fit a mechanical heart while she awaits a donor, and so she needs intensive around-the-clock care with her mother consistently by her side. Maisy has epidermolysis bullosa, known as butterfly syndrome, which is an agonising skin disorder where the body lacks the protein it needs to hold the layers of skin together, making it blistered and as fragile as a butterfly's wing. It is such a rare and serious condition that Great Ormond Street Hospital specialists have been looking after her since birth. Despite the brilliant world-class care, there is nowhere private outside for the families to escape from the constant noise, bustle and bright lights of this huge hospital. The DIY SOS team and Chris Beardshaw have taken on this hugely ambitious build, with tricky logistics and emotional volunteers, in order to offer the many brave families a bespoke and lush calming rooftop garden as a space of welcome respite.
27.6	Million Pound Build for Children in Need	17 November 2016
Nick Knowles, Laurence Llewelyn-Bowen and the trusty purple shirts venture north to Blackpool to tackle this year's most ambitious build in DIY SOS: Million Pound Build for BBC Children in Need. This special DIY SOS is set to capture the nation's heart as Nick and the team highlight the plight of the nation's 250,000 young carers who care on a daily basis for their parents. Blackpool Carers Trust provides limited out-of-school respite and training activities as well as peer support for young carers, and their current centre is bursting at the seams. The Blackpool Carers Trust, which is supported with funding from BBC Children in Need, provides much-needed support to young carers like 11-year-old Tyanna and ten-year-old Gracie who bathe and generally care for their ill mother, former nurse Suzanne who was diagnosed with osteoporosis, but also their dad Sean who is dealing with cancer. The Carers Trust has inherited a broken, enormous build which sees a dramatic reinvention of a huge overgrown garden and run-down, neglected building into an unrecognisable, inspiring and colourful base for youths with caring responsibilities. It's all done in the cheeky DIY SOS spirit which includes an attempt on their very own 'most selfies in three minutes' for a Guinness World Record.
28.5	Veteran Street	8 November 2017
DIY SOS is back on veteran street in Manchester to build the final home on the road for a decorated former soldier and his young family. Two years ago, with the help of Prince William and Prince Harry, DIY SOS launched their most ambitious project yet - transforming a derelict street into a vibrant community for veterans and local people, creating new homes and a veterans' support centre. Now, with the project almost complete, Nick Knowles and the team return to build the last remaining home for amputee and single dad Simon Flores, whose foot was blown off by a roadside bomb during a patrol in Iraq.
28.6	Million Pound Build for Children in Need	17 November 2017
The team descend on Swansea to build a centre and supported housing for young people in care and leaving care. This special episode shares the stories from some of Wales's most vulnerable young people as well as the founder of the Roots Foundation Wales, a charity part-funded by BBC Children in Need that supports young people in and leaving care.
	Grenfell Boxing Club	5 September 2018
	Community Centre	12 September 2018
30.5	The Big Build Children In Need Special	13 November 2019
n/a ^{D}	Children in Need Special 2020 - Caswell Bay	12 November 2020

^{A} - Broadcast between series 22 & 23

^{B} - Broadcast between the regular series 23 episodes, 23.6 and 23.7, but not allocated a number

^{C} - Broadcast between the regular series 24 episodes, 24.1 and 24.2, but not allocated a number

^{D} - Broadcast before the regular series 31 episodes

=== Special Look back Episodes ===
No.	Title	Broadcast
	Behind The Scenes Special	3 October 2002
A 30-minute behind-the-scenes special.
No.	Title	Broadcast
	DIY SOS Special The Losers Show	17 June 2003
A look at the various people who were not successful in the various public votes to choose who would be on assisted by the show.
No.	Title	Broadcast
	Remixed Episode 1	2 January 2009
No.	Title	Broadcast
	Remixed Episode 2	7 January 2009
No.	Title	Broadcast
	Celebrating 20 Years	5 September 2019

=== Series 20 ===
No.	Title	Broadcast
20.1	Chessington	15 April 2010
Complete the extension of Liz's house, made necessary by her son James' special needs; having gone into debt to pay for the work, it had been started in July 2008 but abandoned unfinished and unsafe by the builders six months later.
20.2	Haydock	1 July 2010
Renovate the home of social work student Lorraine and her three children; left in a half finished state, the house lacks a communal area for the family to spend time together

=== Series 21 ===
No.	Title	Broadcast
21.1	Brynmawr	26 August 2010
Completion of a kitchen extension on Ceri's former council house, a project he had begun himself but had to stop after redundancy and debilitating illness; as a result the family's three teenage daughters had spent two years living with their grandparents in their two bedroom flat.
21.2	Littlehampton	30 December 2010
Making good the destruction caused by rogue builders on Mike's house; he had invested his life savings on the work, the need for which had become evident after his 16-year-old son suffered an asthma attack while visiting, caused by the damp conditions of the aged flint built building.
21.3	Nottingham	6 January 2011
Complete the two-storey extension of Kathy's home, where she lived with her two teenage children. The work had been started by husband and father Shaun in 2007, who after a year had completed it up to roof level, before committing suicide after losing his job.
21.4	OChippenham	26 January 2011
Add an extension and modify Sue's two-storey home, made necessary after her eldest son Jay's brain injury suffered during a rugby match in March 2009; having spent a year in a coma in hospital, on waking, his return home to live with his mother and two siblings was conditional on the necessary change (adding a downstairs bedroom, wet room and space for a wheelchair) being approved by carers.

=== Series 22 ===
No.	Title	Broadcast
22.1	Aberystwyth	13 April 2011
Completion of an extension to Micheal's home; a builder by trade he had begun the task after his son-in-law's multiple sclerosis had meant he had to start using a wheelchair, but had to stop when Micheal himself was diagnosed with a brain tumour.
22.2	Durham	20 April 2011
Reconfigure the family home of sixteen-year-old Kieron, who had had a heart transplant and a double amputation due to a heart condition, only diagnosed after he collapsed in December 2009; for the past year his situation had meant the family had to live apart.
22.3	Stoke	27 April 2011
Completion of the renovation of Haydn's house; bought at auction in 2004 he had begun the work himself, but had to abandon it shortly after following a terminal diagnosis of abdominal cancer; as a result Haydn, his wife and three daughters were having to live out of the one room he had managed to finish.
22.4	Cirencester	2 August 2011
Complete the extension and renovation of Leslie and Maria's former council house, which they had begun themselves but had to stop after just a year in 2007 after running out of money and later enduring various other crises, including one of their children to miss nearly a year of schooling through ill health.
22.5	Dartford	9 August 2011
Extending and renovating single-mother Louise's post war prefab house, which she had been working on until her son was diagnosed with Autistic Spectrum Disorder.
22.6	Ottery St Mary	16 August 2011
Completion of the conversion of music teacher Ian and Morny's two-bedroom bungalow into a four-bedroom house to suit the family's various needs, which included one of their children having learning difficulties and Morny's chronic long-term illness; Ian had begun the work himself, but had soon been overwhelmed.

=== Series 23 ===
No.	Title	Broadcast
23.1	Chesterfield	10 January 2012
Completion of an extension to Lisa and Richard's house, whose daughter Madison was born with a heart defect and a rare eating disorder necessitating 24 hour care; a builder by trade Richard had begun the task himself but had not got beyond erecting the basic shell.
23.2	Conwy	18 January 2012
Completion of the two-storey breeze block shell of a house being built by David for him and his eight-year-old daughter, Erica. He had begun the project himself, but work came to a halt after he was diagnosed with cancer in 2009, and his wife and Erica's mother died in 2010. As a result, David and Erica had been living in a caravan next to the shell since 2006.
23.3	Enfield	16 May 2012
Improvements to the terraced house of Eric, wife Davina and their three daughters, made necessary by Eric's terminal diagnosis of motor neuron disease.
23.4	Dumfries	23 May 2012
Renovation of Sue's country cottage, home to her and her two young children, which has become dilapidated in the years since the sudden death of Sue's partner Barry from a heart attack on Christmas Day 2003.
23.5	Dudley	30 May 2012
Completion of an extension to Wayne and Joanne's house, made necessary to care for their three children, who all have the inherited condition Fragile X Syndrome; they had begun the task themselves a year earlier, but were unable to complete the job.
23.6	Duxford	6 June 2012
Completion of an extension to Paul and Sarah's small bungalow; they had begun it themselves but had to abandon the work after their young son Joshua was diagnosed with a rare and aggressive form of liver cancer.
23.7	Huntingdon	3 January 2013
Expansion of single mother Julie's house, made necessary after she fulfilled her childhood friend Caroline's last will and testament wish by becoming legal guardian to her five younger children (aged seven to thirteen in 2013), expanding her family which already consisted of three sons (aged 15 to 20). Caroline had died from an inoperable brain tumour in June 2010, while her husband David had died suddenly from a brain haemorrhage just six months earlier.
23.8	Worksop	13 February 2013
Completion of the extension of Neil and Rebecca's house; they had embarked on the work themselves as their family grew, but had to stop after Neil was made redundant and their youngest child was diagnosed with autism.
23.9	Fareham	8 October 2013
A single-storey extension and upgrades to Hanna and Mike's small family home, made necessary after their youngest two of three children, twin boys, were born prematurely, resulting in one having cerebral palsy and the other being profoundly deaf.
23.10	Maidstone	15 October 2013
Improvements to the terrace home of former British Army engineer and parachutist Mo, which was no longer suitable for his and his family's needs; having been medically discharged after 20 years service due to prolonged and continuous damage to his knees, his condition had deteriorated to the point where he could no longer walk unaided and was in near constant pain.

=== Series 24 ===
No.	Title	Broadcast
24.1	Halifax	22 October 2013
Improvements to eight-year-old Josh's house, whose paralysis was restricting him to just two rooms.
24.2	Misterton	6 March 2014
Completion and upgrading of an extension of Paul's two bedroom house to house his large family, which he was performing himself before his wife died shortly after she gave birth to their sixth child. This was the biggest single house project of the show so far, and was hampered by blizzard conditions.
24.3	Manchester	19 March 2014
Improvements to Rebecca and Steve's small house, which is no longer suitable following the birth of the couple's triplets two years earlier.
24.4	Spalding	19 May 2014
Improvements to the home of eight-year-old Dakota, who was born with quadriplegic cerebral palsy; the resulting increase in mobility is expected to increase her life expectancy of just 15 years.
24.5	Bury	30 May 2014
Completion of upgrades to Michelle and Rod's house, made necessary due to the disabilities suffered by their six-year-old daughter Maddie as a result of a rare brain disease; they had begun the project themselves two years previously but had encountered unforeseen problems which meant they were living in just two rooms.

=== Series 25 ===
No.	Title	Broadcast
25.1	Sunderland	12 May 2014
Extension of John and June's house, made necessary after June contracted a brain infection in 2010 and has been confined to a hospital bed in the kitchen ever since, unable to walk or talk.
25.2	Cumbria	28 August 2014
Completion and upgrading of improvements to the 18th Century home of Rob and Michelle, which they were doing up themselves until their son Noah was born with spina bifida and only two per cent of his brain.
25.3	Hereford	4 September 2014
A two-storey extension to the house of firefighter Colin and his wife Clare, made necessary by the February 2012 diagnosis of their eldest son Christopher, who has Duchenne muscular dystrophy.
25.4	Warrington	11 September 2014
Improvements to electrician Dave's house after he was left partially paralysed by a stroke, leaving him confined to a hospital bed in the kitchen of the house he shares with his wife and two daughters.
25.5	Orpington	18 September 2014
Improvements to former hospital worker Jason and cardiac nurse Effie's two floor house, which is no longer suitable for them and their two children after Jason was left visually impaired, paralysed down one side and with limited speech after a motorcycle accident.
25.6	Basildon	21 October 2014
Improvements to Jenny's home so that it is safe for her nine-year-old son Brandon, who has an extreme form of epilepsy.

=== Series 26 ===
No.	Title	Broadcast
26.1	Swansea	18 December 2014
Improvements to Helen's small three bedroom semi-detached house to allow fifteen-year-old Jack, born with a rare form of muscular dystrophy, to sleep upstairs, and enable the family to spend more time together (Jack also having an elder brother, Dan).
26.2	Dartford	3 June 2015
Improvements to Scott and Jenny's two-up, two-down end-of-terrace house, to allow their 13-year-old son Charlie, who was born with spastic quadriplegic cerebral palsy and global developmental delay, to remain with the family alongside his two older and two younger brothers. This was the biggest single house project of the show so far, involving a rebuild of the entire downstairs and remodeling of the rest.
26.3	Wigan	10 June 2015
Addition of a self-contained apartment alongside Frank and Christine's two-bedroom bungalow so that they can care for their 35-year-old son Mark, who requires 24 hour care after suffering severe brain damage and paralysis as a result of an unprovoked attack in April 2012; for the past two years he had been living in a care home 15 miles.
26.4	Hull	17 June 2015
Improvements to Liz and Jason's house, which Jason was improving before being diagnosed with the genetic condition Fabry's disease and also later motor neurone disease, giving him just years to live; this will allow Jason to continue to live with his family, and allow Liz to care for their daughters, who also have the genetic condition.
26.5	Loughborough	16 July 2015
Improvements to 41-year-old father Mark's home to allow him to better recover from cancer, and give the family more space to care for their identical twins Katie and Emelia, born with achondroplasia.
26.6	Epsom	23 July 2015
Improvements to the inadequate home of Sam and Ben, who are struggling to find time to both work as paramedics and raise their two sons, one of whom, five-year-old Ewan, has special needs.
26.9	Holmfirth	17 December 2015
Improvements to former police officer Richard and Jude's home, which is no longer suitable for them and their three sons, Harry, nine, Oscar, seven and Archie, four, after Richard suffered a brainstem stroke in June 2012 and has only partially recovered after being locked-in for nine months, now living as an electric wheelchair user with limited speech and movement.

=== Series 27 ===
No.	Title	Broadcast
27.1	Birmingham	17 February 2016
The DIY SOS team is back and in Birmingham helping a family in need. Charlotte and Chris have twins who were born prematurely and have a condition known as global development delay. It is a condition which has slowed down their progress of walking and talking. Their cramped house is hindering their progress even more, and if they have any chance of catching up, they're going to need DIY SOS and a host of volunteers from the local community to rebuild their lives and give the family a better future.
27.2	Hopesay	9 June 2016
Completion of the renovation of former firefighter Joe's two bedroom two floor cottage; he had begun it himself before being hampered by an injury which meant he had to leave the fire service, and also a lack of funds due to flooding of the site. He also had to deal with the death of his wife from leukemia in 2014 shortly into the build. Completion would allow Joe and his 7-year-old daughter Lisa to move out of the caravan they had been living in on the site.
27.3	Cheltenham	20 September 2016
The team are in Cheltenham, Gloucestershire, with DIY SOS going for Paralympic gold to help build a home fit for a champion. Seventeen-year-old Scott Jones is a young disabled athlete who is already a world champion and who is eager to be self-sufficient at home. But the house's current design is proving challenging. The DIY SOS team's ambitious build is a large side and rear extension to provide Scott with his own bespoke bedroom, wet room, access to an adapted kitchen and, most importantly an amazing, state-of-the-art gym studio set in the garden to help him achieve his dream of going to Tokyo 2020. As ever, it is an immensely challenging build, so will the DIY SOS team be winners in Scott's eyes once the home is renovated?
27.4	Derby	29 September 2016
Rachel and Andy Smith's middle child Isaac has spastic quadriplegia, a severe form of cerebral palsy and Andy or Rachel must be available at all times to care for him because he sleeps fitfully in a hospital bed in the family living room. It's making family life stressful including for Isaac's siblings as the design of their home is in conflict with what this family really need. The DIY SOS team and hundreds of volunteers turn the Smiths' lives around by building an amazing extension and a beautifully landscaped garden.
27.7	Eckington	1 February 2017
Nick Knowles, Laurence Llewelyn-Bowen and hundreds of Worcestershire volunteer builders rescue 17-year-old Antonia Payne-Cheney, who has been kept prisoner in hospital for the last three years by Ehlers–Danlos syndrome, a debilitating and rare condition. Until 14 she was a healthy girl, enjoying gymnastics and cheerleading, but now she is hospital bed-bound. Her joints regularly dislocate and she is unable to eat normally, so she is fed through a line directly into her heart. As a result of her complex condition, Antonia will remain in hospital until the necessary home adaptations have been made. To give Antonia the freedom to return home, the ambitious DIY SOS build features a functional sterile space for medical procedures in her own bespoke bedroom, a specially adapted wet room that offers her freedom and dignity and an accessible space for her to socialise with family and her friends. As ever, it's an immensely challenging build carried out over the hottest week of the year, so sweat and tears flow in this emotional and entertaining episode.
27.8	Rotherham	21 February 2017
When 36-year-old Terry Guest, father of two daughters, had a catastrophic brain injury, he was left with severe disabilities. As his house was unsuitable for him, the only care available was an old-people's dementia care home, where he remained for several years. In need of more day-to-day care and a place of his own, his sister Tracey stepped in to offer help, but her house was also unsuitable. Now DIY SOS and their team of generous South Yorkshire volunteers and suppliers are stepping in to adapt Tracey's home and also, in a DIY SOS first, build Terry his very own separate pad at the end of the garden. Battling adverse Yorkshire weather, the team's electrician Billy's tricks with the electrics and a massive misjudgement in ordering materials, this unique build definitely tests the team's resolve.
27.9	Bidford on Avon	22 March 2017
Nick Knowles, Laurence Llewelyn Bowen and hundreds of Warwickshire volunteer builders help Chloe, whose cramped family living room has been her prison for the last two years. When Chloe was 18 years old, doctors diagnosed her with mastocytosis, a rare genetic disorder. As a result, Chloe now requires constant access to oxygen, must be fed through a tube in her chest and is prone to seizures that cause her joints to dislocate and stop her breathing. Chloe currently lives with her mum Susie, stepdad Phil and stepbrother Josh, but the current design of this tired house means her future in the family home is not guaranteed. So to improve Chloe's life and future-proof her care and accommodation, the DIY SOS team redesign the entire house to provide Chloe with independence, thanks to her own self-contained apartment, complete with bedroom, wet room and sitting room. As ever, it's a challenging but fun build, with mismeasurements aplenty and a barrister volunteering as a barista - so at least there's good coffee on site!
27.10	Monmouth	29 March 2017
In Monmouthshire, Nick and the team help Charlotte, who's fighting to recover from a stroke she had giving birth to her twin boys Teddy and Fox. Charlotte's stroke left her with brain damage, speech loss and partial paralysis but finally after months of intensive rehab, she is back home with husband Rob and the boys. Physically, she is slowly teaching herself to walk and battling hard to regain her speech. Her other battle is with the design of the house, as the cramped, cluttered rooms are unsafe for Charlotte to move around and there's nowhere for her to do her physio, hampering her recovery. That's where DIY SOS step in. Building a home will bring this fractured family together and help Charlotte get better, but it's going to take an army of volunteers and as ever they've got just nine highly stressed days.

=== Series 28 ===
No.	Title	Broadcast
28.1	Isle of Sheppey	8 June 2017
The Isle of Sheppey in Kent is home to an extraordinary family - two boys and two girls brought together by two dads. Head teacher Garry and social carer Kyle first fostered then adopted four vulnerable children, three with complex special needs, because they wanted to give them the best life possible. Unfortunately their tired, crammed three-bed bungalow now threatens their family's future. They desperately need space and dignity, but the only thing to do is to knock the entire house down and start again. Enter Nick Knowles and the team, who are taking on a DIY SOS first - and one of their most ambitious home builds ever. The team are going to demolish the bungalow and in just nine days build an entirely new bespoke five-bedroom home for this inspiring family. It is all thanks to the amazing goodwill, hard work and generosity of the local community and trades. Garry and Kyle first adopted Haydn, who has cerebral palsy, and then Curtis, who was adopted at four months old and is severely epileptic, blind and prone to life-threatening chest infections and also has cerebral palsy. The two dads then fostered sisters Bella, who was six, and Phoebe, who was one. Bella has Down's syndrome, so when there was a hint that the sisters may be split up, they decided to offer a lifeline to both girls and applied to adopt. Taking on four children with so many needs is a challenge for any family, but living in a tiny bungalow is another hurdle, and every room is bursting with medical supplies. Haydn is now 13 and a growing lad, and he needs some independence. He cannot get out of the front door without somebody helping him. Curtis, now six, has the greatest medical needs and sleeps in the living room, which is also their dining room. Bella is now 11 but has a makeshift bedroom in the boot room, and they all share just one toilet in the only bathroom. The flimsy structure and impractical design of the house means it is best to demolish the property, but that's an enormous undertaking. Garry and Kyle have built an amazing family - now DIY SOS and their team of volunteer trades have an almighty challenge, never before attempted on the programme, to build an entirely new home in just nine days
28.2	Welwyn Garden City	15 June 2017
Kidney failure has meant that midwife Sascha has to endure intensive dialysis at hospital just to stay alive. This intense dialysis for hours on end, five days a week, places her body under immense stress with the constant threat of life-risking blood clots. If this continues, Sascha, a mother to four children, has a life expectancy of just a few years. However, Sascha could do self-dialysis daily from her home, and the increase in frequency and the decrease in intensity would mean her life expectancy and lifestyle would improve dramatically. So that is where DIY SOS and the generous volunteers and trades of Billy's home turf, Welwyn Garden City, step up to help one of their own. In an emotionally charged episode, Sascha's family home is completely renovated and extended to include a dedicated home-dialysis room for Sascha, which offers her a lifeline and extra years with her loving family.
28.3	Telford	22 June 2017
In Shropshire, three amazing school children and an energetic head teacher inspire the DIY SOS team and hundreds of volunteers to help 12-year-old Matthew return home from hospital for the first time in three years, after suffering cancer and a stroke. Matthew has yearned to return home, but as his house is completely unsuitable for his complex medical needs and equipment, he is stuck in hospital. His schoolmates fundraised wherever they could and campaigned to get Matthew home. Now the DIY SOS team join their crusade. With a Doctor Who-inspired interior design, enormous community spirit and the power of friendship, this is a DIY SOS Big Build to inspire.
28.4	Bristol	29 June 2017
Twenty-four-year-old Ryan has spent the last five years in a hospital room, 50 miles away from home and his loving family. At the time, warehouse worker Dave Pollard and checkout operator Rachel were happily living in a small three-bedroom house in south Bristol, filled to the brim with their four kids - Ryan, Jason, Darren and Gemma. Then the family's busy lives came to a screeching halt. After serious headaches five years ago, Ryan was rushed in for an emergency operation where doctors discovered he had a blocked ventricle. A CT scan revealed that the build-up of fluid and pressure had caused brain damage. Ryan had lost control of his breathing, swallowing and was partially paralysed. He was transferred to the nearest specialist neurological unit, 50 miles away. Five years later, he's still there and his loving mother Rachel catches public transport for five hours every day to visit Ryan. This family is torn apart. The house needs a downstairs extension with all the bespoke care provision that Ryan will need: physio space, wet room, family space and the ability to access the entire ground floor. If the family does not get this work done, Ryan will remain in hospital. They need the DIY SOS team and the generous volunteers of Bristol help to get Ryan home.

=== Series 29 ===
No.	Title	Broadcast
29.1	Arundel	4 January 2018
Amanda, mother of four and wife to local builder Vic, was training on her bicycle for an iron man when her brakes failed on Bury Hill, West Sussex. Travelling at 40 mph, she lost control and smashed into a signpost which catapulted her into bushes. The enormous impact meant Amanda broke 11 bones, punctured a lung and snapped her collarbone and her back. In vast pain, Amanda lay there motionless and described the sensation "like my spinal fluid was leaking from my body". It was two hours before Amanda was found by another cyclist. On arrival at A&E, she was told that she had been left paralysed. That evening, a national newspaper featured her selfie from the hospital with a beaming smile advising friends: "I don't want to make anyone sad or upset but I'm not going to walk again", and she was determined to continue to compete as a para-athlete. With husband Vic now tending to the four children, Amanda spent the next six months at Stoke Mandeville spinal unit. Even during her darkest days at the unit, she would help to feed other patients to keep busy and to remind herself that - in her mind - it could have been worse for her. After two gruelling 12-hour back operations, she returned home in a wheelchair. Her home was now unsuitable, so that is where the DIY SOS volunteers come to the family's rescue.
29.2	Barnet	7 March 2018
29.3	West Bromwich	14 March 2018
29.4	Avening	3 October 2018
29.5	Mildenhall	17 January 2019

=== Series 30 ===
No.	Title	Broadcast
30.1	Hessle	3 April 2019
30.2	Torquay	23 May 2019
30.3	Plymouth	24 October 2019
30.4	Bromsgrove	20 November 2019
30.5	Bolton	27 November 2019
30.6	Bromley	11 December 2019

=== Series 31 ===
No.	Title	Broadcast
31.1	Scunthorpe	19 November 2020
31.2	Carbis Bay	26 November 2020
31.3	Weston-super-Mare	3 December 2020
31.4	Barnstaple	15 February 2021
31.5	Bangor	22 February 2021
31.6	Corby	17 May 2022

=== Series 32 ===
No.	Title	Broadcast
32.1	Kettering	10 May 2022
Midwife Lindsey married ex-Royal Engineer Shaun in 2016. Lindsey had two children from a previous marriage and then had two boys with Shaun. In the summer of 2021, they began to extend their house, with a local builder working with them to put in the foundations, walls and roof, and to get the extension up to first fix. The plan was for Shaun to finish the build himself. Several months after starting the build, Shaun fell ill. Initially, he had an operation on his kidneys and bowel, but within months he was struck down by an aggressive cancer and tragically died In November 2021. Lindsey and her four are devastated, and their grief is compounded by the fact that their home is currently uninhabitable. But help is on hand as the DIY SOS team, along with designer Gabrielle Blackman and hundreds of local trades, volunteers and some of Shaun's old army buddies, step in to finish the job and get this lovely family back home.
32.2	Southmead	24 May 2022
32.3	Longframlington	31 May 2022
32.4	Stoke	7 June 2022
32.5	Charlton Kings	14 June 2022
