= Nick Knowles =

English television presenter and musical artist (born 1962)

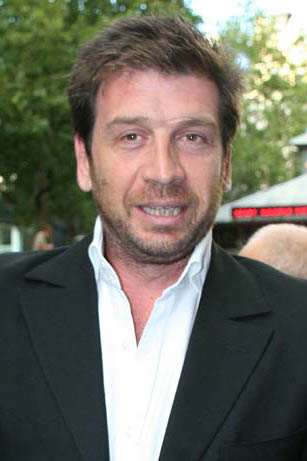
- Born: Nicholas Simon Augustine Knowles; 21 September 1962 (age 63); Southall, Middlesex, England
- Occupation: Television presenter
- Years active: 1987–present
- Known for: DIY SOS; Who Dares Wins; Real Rescues; Perfection; Secret Fortune; Break the Safe; 5-Star Family Reunion
- Spouses: Gillian Knowles (m. 1996; div. 2000) Jessica Moor (m. 2012; div. 2017) Katie Dadzie (m. 2025)
- Partner: Suzi Perry (2000–2003)
- Children: 4
- Website: Official website

Nicholas Simon Augustine Knowles (born 21 September 1962) is an English television presenter, writer and musician. He has hosted several television programmes including Real Rescues (2007–2013), Who Dares Wins (2007–2019), Break the Safe (2013–2014), 5-Star Family Reunion (2015–2016), and DIY SOS (1999–present).

== Early life ==
Knowles was born in Southall, Middlesex. At the age of 12, Knowles moved to Mildenhall in Suffolk, attending St Louis Middle School in Bury St Edmunds, and moved again, attending Gunnersbury Catholic School for Boys. After another family move to Deakin Leas in Tonbridge, he attended the Skinners' School in Tunbridge Wells, Kent, where he passed eight O-levels, and excelled at rugby.

Leaving school at 16, he had a number of entry-level jobs as a labourer, petrol station assistant and salesman. He played in bands from the age of 14 and was constantly writing music, poetry and comedy, until he submitted a script to a BBC2 programme that invited children to make a video.

== Career ==
=== Television ===
Knowles began as a runner in television production, before moving into presenting. Knowles was a reporter for TVS in the South East, reporting on the nightly news programme Coast to Coast.

He is principally known as the main host of DIY SOS, a home renovation series broadcast on BBC One since 1999, and has presented the BBC factual show Real Rescues since 2007. Knowles has also hosted several entertainment programmes for the BBC since signing an exclusive contract with them, including Who Dares Wins, Last Choir Standing, Guesstimation, Secret Fortune, and Perfection.

Knowles has also presented programmes with a wildlife theme. In 2007, he fronted Mission Africa, in which a team of volunteers constructed a game reserve in Kenya. During this project, Knowles fell from a Land Rover, dislocating his shoulder. He flew back to the UK to receive emergency treatment. In the same year, he reported on the plight of orphaned orangutans for an edition of Saving Planet Earth. In 2009, Knowles co‑presented the BBC reality TV series Wildest Dreams with James Honeyborne, in which novice candidates had to complete a set of challenging tasks filming wild animals in Africa. The winner joined the BBC Natural History Unit on a one-year placement.

From 2011 to 2015, Knowles was the presenter of the BBC game show Perfection, in which the candidates must achieve absolute perfection to win the jackpot, aired weekdays on BBC One. From 2013 to 2014, he presented the BBC National Lottery game show Break the Safe. In 2015, Knowles began presenting the new BBC One National Lottery game show 5-Star Family Reunion, which returned for a second series in 2016.

In May 2016, Knowles presented Invictus: The Road to the Games, a one-off programme for the BBC. Knowles earned between £300,000 and £349,999 as a BBC presenter for the financial year 2016–2017.

In 2018, he participated in the eighteenth series of I'm a Celebrity...Get Me Out Of Here!, finishing in sixth place, after being voted out on 6 December.

From April 2019, he presented the BBC show Home Is Where the Art Is, in which he challenges three artists to create beautiful artwork for people they've never met. The show ran for a second series in 2021.

In May 2021, it was reported that Knowles was holding talks with the BBC regarding his role as the main host of DIY SOS due to his appearance in a Shreddies TV advert which violated BBC's commercial agreements and guidelines. A week later, the BBC announced that they had resolved the issue and Knowles would return to his DIY SOS role with filming to resume in the coming months and is expected to be back on screens in 2022.

Between August and September 2021, Knowles presented the Channel 5 series Nick Knowles' Big House Clearout.

In September 2024, Knowles was a contestant on the twenty-second series of BBC's Strictly Come Dancing, partnered with professional dancer Luba Mushtuk. Having injured his shoulder before the second show, he had to perform an American Smooth, to the song "Parklife" by Blur, after only 16 hours of training. He did not perform in the third week due to injury and as a result, his Charleston to "Rain on the Roof" (from Paddington 2) was postponed to the following week. In the fourth week, he performed his Movie Week Charleston, but was eliminated in the dance off.

=== Film ===
Knowles was a co-writer on the 2016 film Golden Years, which stars Simon Callow, Virginia McKenna and Una Stubbs.

=== Music ===
He released his first and last music album, Every Kind Of People, on 3 November 2017. It entered the UK Albums Chart at No. 92.

== Personal life ==
Knowles was married to his first wife Gillian Knowles from 1996 to 2000, and they share a son and daughter. He dated his second wife Jessica Rose Moor from 2009; they married in September 2012 but divorced in 2017. Knowles has four children in total. In 2021, he was reportedly dating Katie Dadzie and the couple became engaged. The two married on 7 June 2025 at Braxted Park in Essex.

His brother has a record company, and his three sisters all became dancers.

In 2018, he was reported to be living in Spain.

In June 2019, Knowles was issued with a six-month driving ban and fined £1,480 for speeding and using a mobile phone whilst driving. Speaking outside the court in Cheltenham, he said: "For me, this was a wake-up call, and putting my phone in the boot of my car now stops the temptation."

=== Interests and charity support ===
In November 2013, Knowles and his then wife Jessica opened an antiques shop and home design consultancy in Eton, Berkshire.

Knowles plays rugby and adheres to a dietary regimen that is vegan "80 per cent of the time". In 2016, he became involved with a Shrewsbury-based vegan restaurant called O'Joy. The restaurant closed in November 2017.

Knowles has been a regular supporter of the children's anti-bullying charity Act Against Bullying. He sang "Addicted to Love" for Children in Need 2008.

Knowles has expressed support for Cornish nationhood, calling himself "Cornish by choice" and saying in August 2026:

"…then on top of that you've got this amazing identity that Cornwall has, it's the other Celtic nation. All Cornish people know this, but not necessarily the rest of the country does, but Kernow is more of a country in its own right rather than just a county…"

== Filmography ==
=== Television ===
Year	Title	Role	Notes
1994–2002	Ridge Riders	Presenter	
1997–1999	5's Company	Co-presenter	Daytime series
1999–2010	DIY SOS	Presenter	Primetime series
2002	Airline	Himself	Fly-on-the-wall documentary
2003–2004	Judgemental	Presenter	Game show
2003–2005	City Hospital	Co-presenter	Daytime series
2005	Hollyoaks	Fraud Patroller	
2007–2011, 2013	Real Rescues	Co-presenter	Daytime series
2007–2019	Who Dares Wins	Presenter	Game show
2008	Last Choir Standing	Co-presenter	
2009	Guesstimation	Presenter	National Lottery game show
2009	Wildest Dreams	Presenter	
2010–present	DIY SOS: The Big Build	Presenter	Primetime BBC series
2011–2012	Secret Fortune	Presenter	National Lottery game show
2011–2015	Perfection	Presenter	Daytime game show
2013–2014	Break the Safe	Presenter	National Lottery game show
2014, 2016–present	Close Calls: On Camera	Presenter	
2015–2016	5-Star Family Reunion	Presenter	Game show
2016	Invictus: The Road to the Games	Presenter	One-off special
2016	The Retreat	Presenter	5-part series
2017	Mind Over Marathon	Presenter	
2018	I'm a Celebrity...Get Me Out of Here!	Contestant	6th place
2019-2020	Home is where the Art is	Presenter	
2021–present	Nick Knowles' Big House Clearout	Presenter	Primetime series
2021	Nick Knowles' New Homes	Presenter	Home improvement series
2021	Nick Knowles Heritage Rescue	Presenter	Historical buildings restoration series
2022	Nick Knowles' Railway Journeys	Presenter	Travel documentary series
2023	Into the Grand Canyon with Nick Knowles	Presenter	Two-part travel documentary
2023	Amazing Railway Adventures with Nick Knowles	Presenter	Travel series
2023	Into Death Valley with Nick Knowles	Presenter	Two-part travel documentary
2023	Between the Covers	Guest	One episode
2024	The Mighty Mississippi with Nick Knowles	Presenter	Two-part travel documentary
2024	Nick Knowles in South America	Presenter	Three-part travel documentary
2024	Strictly Come Dancing	Contestant	Series 22
2025	Lost in the Desert with Nick Knowles	Presenter	Three-part travel documentary

=== Film ===
Year	Title	Role	Notes
2016	Golden Years	Co-writer, executive producer	Comedy film

== Discography ==
=== Studio albums ===
Title	Details	Peak chart positions
Title	Details	UK
Every Kind of People	Released: 3 November 2017; Label: UMC; Formats: Digital download, CD	92

=== Singles ===
Year	Title	Album
2017	"River"	Every Kind of People
2017	"Make You Feel My Love"	Every Kind of People
2017	"Every Kinda People"	Every Kind of People

== Music videos ==
Year	Title	Director(s)
2017	"River"	—N/a
2017	"Make You Feel My Love"	—N/a
2017	"Every Kinda People"	—N/a
