= Fremantle (company) =

Television content and production subsidiary

FremantleMedia Limited
- Logo used since 2018
- Trade name: Fremantle
- Formerly: Pearson Television (1993–2001); FremantleMedia (2001–2018)
- Type: Subsidiary
- Industry: Television
- Predecessors: All American Communications; Reg Grundy Organisation; Thames Television; Mark Goodson Productions
- Founded: 23 April 1993; 33 years ago
- Headquarters: London, England
- Area served: Worldwide
- Key people: Jennifer Mullin (CEO)
- Parent: Pearson plc (1993–2000); RTL Group (2000–present)
- Subsidiaries: See § Production offices and labels
- Website: fremantle.com

Fremantle Licensing
- Formerly: Fremantle Overseas Radio and Television (1952–1958); Fremantle International (1958–1994, 2018–present for Fremantle's current international distribution division); All American Fremantle International Inc (1994–1998); Pearson Television Licensing (1998–2001)
- Type: Subsidiary
- Industry: Television
- Founded: 1952; 74 years ago
- Founder: Paul Talbot
- Headquarters: New York City, New York, U.S.
- Area served: Worldwide
- Parent: All American Television (1994–1998); Pearson plc (1998–2000); RTL Group (2000–present)
- Website: fremantle.com

FremantleMedia Limited, known as Fremantle (/ˈfriːmæntəl/; formerly FremantleMedia), is a British multinational television production and distribution company based in London. The company was founded as Pearson Television in 1993 when publishing and education company Pearson acquired the former British ITV franchisee Thames Television. Fremantle takes its name from Fremantle International, which was acquired by predecessor company All American Television in 1994. Pearson Television and Bertelsmann's CLT-UFA merged in 2000 to form the RTL Group, with Pearson Television itself being renamed FremantleMedia on 20 August of the following year.

Fremantle owns non-scripted formats, including the British talent shows Idols, Got Talent and The X Factor; all of which have been sold globally. Since 1994, Fremantle has distributed American game shows locally in the United States and globally.

== History ==
=== Pearson Television (1993–2001) ===
On 23 April 1993, Pearson plc bought Thames Television, which had been one of the "Big Five" franchisees in the ITV network from 1968 to 1992, and, as an independent production company, was continuing to produce many shows for ITV and other broadcasters. Thames became the first division of Pearson Television, and Pearson gained the rights to Thames programmes like The Benny Hill Show and The Bill.

Then in 1995 it acquired Australian production company Grundy Television. Allied Communications Inc. (ACI), an American-based distributor of made-for-television films, was purchased later that year for $40 million.

In January 1996, Pearson Television acquired the British production company SelecTV plc, and merged into it.

Pearson Television announced on 1 October 1997 that it would launch a $373 million cash tender offer for publicly traded American television company All American Communications Inc. On 5 November, Pearson completed its tender offer, and All American was merged into Pearson Television the following year. This acquisition gave Pearson worldwide rights to various game show formats as well as drama series in the United States such as Baywatch, while All American Music Group was sold to Zomba Records subsidiary Volcano Entertainment. The move reunited Fremantle's rights to the Goodson game shows in Europe with Grundy's rights to the Goodson game show formats outside the US and Europe.

Pearson Television acquired Italian drama production company Mastrofilm on 3 November 1998, and European animation financer and distributor EVA Entertainment on 2 February 1999. On 29 April 1999, the company had bought out independent British television gameshow producer Regent Productions.

In June 2000, Pearson Television had announced their decision to take over Smith & Jones' British production company Talkback Productions.

==== Fremantle International ====
Fremantle International logo used from 1972 to 1991

The first incarnation of Fremantle was founded in 1952 by Paul Talbot as Fremantle Overseas Radio and Television and later renamed as Fremantle International in 1958, named after the city in Western Australia. It was involved in the production of television series, movies, and specials from 1964 to 1994 and owned game show formats from Mark Goodson-Bill Todman Productions, Stewart Television, Barry & Enright Productions, Kline and Friends, Hatos-Hall Productions, Merv Griffin Productions, Heatter-Quigley Productions, and Chuck Barris Productions internationally.

In 1976, Australian executive Richard Becker, of Becker Entertainment was made head of the Australian operation of Fremantle International Productions, and a year later integrated its operations with R.A. Becker's production arm (later Becker Entertainment) to license out its title library. Two years later, it begin handling global representation of the shows by Goodson-Todman Productions, the largest game show producer and expanded to other producers.

By the 1980s, Fremantle had become the largest producer of game shows in Europe. In 1989, The Interpublic Group of Companies bought a 49% minority interest in Fremantle International. On 20 May 1991, Interpublic Group increased its ownership stake in Fremantle International to 80%, with Paul Talbot retaining a 20% holding in the company.

Interpublic Group agreed to sell assets of Fremantle International to All American Communications Inc. for $63 million in cash and stock on 7 July 1994. All American acquired Fremantle International in August. Paul Talbot continued to own The Fremantle Corporation, the international distributor of All American's Baywatch and other programs until his death in 2005, and the company's assets were later acquired by Canadian-based Kaleidoscope Entertainment in June 2006. All American Fremantle International managed and distributed Mark Goodson Productions' game show formats worldwide. In 1998, All American Television and All-American Fremantle International were renamed Pearson Television North America and Pearson Television Licensing, and operated under those names until being renamed in 2001.

=== FremantleMedia (2001–2018) ===
FremantleMedia logo from 20 August 2001 to 9 September 2018.

In 2000, Bertelsmann announced that it would form a joint venture between its CLT-UFA group (itself a merger of Luxembourg's CLT and German studio UFA GmbH) with Pearson Television (whose library included former British ITV franchise Thames Television, All American Television—who owned the libraries of American syndicators Lexington Broadcast Services and Blair Entertainment and game show producers Mark Goodson Productions and Fremantle International, and Australia's Reg Grundy Organisation) to create a multinational media group and content business—eventually known as RTL Group—to consolidate their broadcasting and production activities, and provide a European competitor to American-owned media conglomerates. The content business would be renamed FremantleMedia in 2001, while Bertelsmann would later increase its stake in RTL Group to achieve majority ownership.

In February 2003, FremantleMedia announced that they are merging two of their successful production outfits, Talkback Productions and Thames Television, by combining their operational departments to form the largest independent television production company named Talkback Thames.

In March 2005, FremantleMedia's worldwide distribution division Fremantle International Distribution had appointed former Granada International drama chief Shane Murphy to become Fremantle International Distribution's newly formed head of acquisitions & development as Shane would work closely with FID's own international sales team, FremantleMedia's licensing arm Fremantle Worldwide Licensing, FremantleMedia's own production departments & subsidiaries and independent production companies including RTL Group's own subsidiaries.

In 2005, FremantleMedia announced their acquisition of a 75% majority stake in Danish production company Blu. They would eventually acquire the remaining shares in the company five years later giving them full control.

In September 2006, FremantleMedia's worldwide commercial licensing & distribution division FremantleMedia Enterprises had it marked its first Canadian production pact as they signed a first-look Canadian production deal with Toronto-based Canadian reality entertainment production company Insight Productions to co-produce & handle distribution of series as FremantleMedia had granted a first-look to distribute Insight's new productions while Insight Productions had gained the rights to adapt Canadian versions of FremantleMedia's formats as the two companies would co-produce them, meanwhile FremantleMedia's licensing division FremantleMedia Licensing Worldwide had promoted its VP of integrated marketing/interactive in the Americas, Keith Hindle, have been promoted to become executive VP of North America as he would handle all of FremantleMedia's American and Canadian activities.

In November 2008, FremantleMedia formed a pact with YouTube to use the internet streaming platform's VideoID technology becoming the first media entertainment company to use YouTube's VideoID technology, FremantleMedia had created its own YouTube channels to present FremantleMedia's new in-house programming made by its British production subsidiary Talkback Thames and FremantleMedia's new media production unit FMX for YouTube as FremantleMedia created its comedy channel Atomic Wedgie

In September 2009, FremantleMedia Enterprises launched a Kids & Family Entertainment division, as a way for the company to expand outside of entertainment, reality and game show formats.

In April 2010, FremantleMedia had acquired Dutch drama television production company FourOne Media in order to expand FremantlteMedia's main in-house Dutch productions operations, the acquisition of Dutch drama television production company FourOne had expanded FremantleMedia's main Dutch production activities to include scripted drama & sitcoms as FremantleMedia's had its Dutch operations increased as its Dutch division had entered the scripted genre while FourOne Media's founder Willem Zijlstra continued to lead FremantleMedia's newly brought Dutch studio as Willem had become the managing director of both FourOne Media and FremantleMedia's fellow Dutch studio Blue Circle.

In November 2010 after Bouchra Rejani, the former CCO of FremantleMedia's French production division based in Paris, FremantleMedia France, departed the French production arm of the British global entertainment company to join Shine Group's French production division Shine France back in June of that year, FremantleMedia's French production division. FremantleMedia France announced it had appointed former France Télévisions executive Damien Cuier as its new CCO of FremantleMedia France reporting to FremantleMedia's Northern and Southern Europe CEO Monica Galer.

In the mid-2010s, FremantleMedia began to increase its investments into "high-end" scripted dramas to diversify its output. The strategy proved successful for the company, with international dramas having increasingly accounted for more of its overall revenue.

In February 2013, FremantleMedia created its global digital & branded entertainment division based in New York that handle FremantleMedia's multi-platforms business and digital operations worldwide along with handling commercial & branded entertainment sponsorships, social media platforms, online gaming operations digital application while the former president of the Americas at FremantleMedia's global distribution division FremantleMedia Enterprises, Keith Hindle, had been appointed to run FremantleMedia's newly formed global digital & branded entertainment division.

In June 2014, FremantleMedia under its American entertainment production arm FremantleMedia North America had entered the digital platform services & have brought all of its digital business which are FremantleMedia North America's online video-sharing platform The Pet Collective, FremantleMedia North America's very own YouTube channel joint venture with Vice Media, Munchies, under one roof as FremantleMedia North America established its very own digital content production studio to develop & produce original series for its own YouTube channels entitled Tiny Riot! following the success of its pet content destination The Pet Collective and joint-ventures into the lifestyle and food genres with StyleHaul and Vice Media respectively, the new digital content production unit of FremantleMedia North America, Tiny Riot!, would develop digital content based on FremantleMedia North America's own game show properties like Family Feud and would provide ad sales, audience development and distribution strategies for all platforms, FremantleMedia North America’s former exec VP of digital content Gayle Gilman have been served as exec VP and general manager of the new digital production unit & would oversee it.

In August 2015, FremantleMedia acquired a 62% majority stake in Italian production company Wildside.

In September 2015, FremantleMedia acquired French scripted content production company Fontaram Productions. Later in that same month, they acquired a 25% stake in Naked Entertainment. However, in 2020, they announced that they took full control of Naked Entertainment acquiring the remaining 75% stake in it. A day later they acquired a 75% majority stake in Dutch reality television production company No Pictures Please.

In October 2015, FremantleMedia acquired a majority stake of Paris-based French scripted production company Kwai and placing the company under their French operations with the CEO of the French division of FremantleMedia Monica Galer becoming CEO of the acquired company.

In November 2015, FremantleMedia had appointed former Banijay Finland CEO Joonas Hytönen to head FremantleMedia's Finnish production operation FremantleMedia Finland and would oversee original programme development slate and the production of local adaptations of FremantleMedia's formats in Finland.

In January 2016, FremantleMedia acquired a 51% majority stake in Tel Aviv-based Israeli scripted reality, drama and entertainment formats television production company Abot Hameiri to expand their international footprint. FremantleMedia's international distribution division will distribute Abot Hameiri's programmes worldwide.

In March 2016, FremantleMedia's worldwide distribution division FremantleMedia International had appointed former Warner Bros. International Television Production executive director of sales, Al De Azpiazu, becoming vice president of distribution in Western Europe.

In September 2017, FremantleMedia acquired a majority stake in the scripted drama division of Australian producer Essential Media and Entertainment after the latter announced that they exiting the drama services and relaunched it as a separate company Easy Tiger with the new company taking over Essential's drama development state with former head of scripted at Essential Media & Entertainment Ian Colle leading the new company.

On 10 January 2018, FremantleMedia's American entertainment production arm FremantleMedia North America appointed former CMT EVP of production & development and executive Jayson Dinsmore to become president of alternative programming & development at FremantleMedia North America as Jayson Dinsmore would be in charge of all of domestic and global unscripted development strategy at FremantleMedia's American entertainment production division FremantleMedia North America under the unscripted genre as he would handle its portfolio like The Price is Right and Family Feud & would oversee production and development of FremantleMedia North America's new original programming.

In January 2018, FremantleMedia announced that they're exiting the children's market by selling their Kids & Family Entertainment division to Canadian production company Boat Rocker Media under their global distribution unit Boat Rocker Rights in order for the former to focus on their scripted and unscripted entertainment genres.

In late-February 2018, FremantleMedia announced that it's president of the French production division FremantleMedia France, Monica Galer, have been stepping down the role of CEO of FremantleMedia's French production division FremantleMedia France after seven years as FremantleMedia France had appointed the executive producer of the French production division's French adaptation of the Got Talent franchise, France's Got Talent, Bruno Fallot, as its new president & CEO of FremantleMedia's French production division FremantleMedia France.

In July 2018, FremantleMedia North America CEO Jennifer Mullin was named the new CEO of the worldwide company, replacing the outgoing Cecile Frot-Coutaz.

=== Fremantle (2018–present) ===
On 10 September 2018, the company changed its public-facing brand to "Fremantle", introducing a new handwritten logo (Fremantle Media remains the company's legal name). Mullin described the logo as a "creative signature" that "[puts] our own unique mark on everything that we do."

In June 2019, Fremantle announced that they struck an overall deal with Richard Brown's new production company Passenger being based in New York and London. Brown's production company Passenger will be developing and producing their scripted drama television shows alongside Fremantle, with Fremantle will be distributing their projects worldwide.

In December 2019, Fremantle announced that they're restructuring their Italian operations in Italy and had established a new scripted development and production company named The Apartment Pictures with co-founder of Wildside Lorenzo Mieli will be heading the new production label.

In July 2020, Fremantle spun off Storyglass into an independent company within Bertelsmann. In September, Fremantle merged Boundless and Naked Entertainment to form Naked Television.

In July 2021, Fremantle announced that they had made an agreement with Swedish-based Scandinavian media and entertainment company Nordic Entertainment Group to acquire 12 scripted and unscripted Nordic production labels such as Strix Television and Moskito Television from Nordic Entertainment Group's television studios division NENT Studios for an undisclosed sum in order for Fremantle to expand their Nordic operations and will use them to launch Fremantle Nordics. Two months later in September of that same year, Fremantle had announced that they've completed their acquisition of 12 scripted and unscripted Nordic production labels from Swedish-based Scandinavian media and entertainment group Nordic Entertainment Group and their division NENT Studios with Fremantle had expanded their Nordic operations and launched Fremantle Nordics division along with the Fremantle Nordics Board being established to handle their acquired labels with Morten Mogensen continued to be the CEO of the 12 labels.

In March 2022, Fremantle announced their acquisition of Italian production house Lux Vide.

In May 2022, Fremantle acquired a majority stake in the Irish film and television production company Element Pictures. As part of the deal, Element's film distribution arm was spun off to form Volta Pictures.

In November 2022, Fremantle announced their acquisition of a majority stake in British independent documentary production company 72 Films, the acquisition of a majority stake in documentary production company 72 Films had expanded Fremantle's documentary production operations as 72 Films' founders David Glover and Mark Raphael continued leading the documentary production company under Fremantle whilst the latter would distribute 72 Films' future content worldwide. A week later on the 15th of that month, Fremantle had acquired a 51% majority stake in Bristol-based factual and natural history independent production company Wildstar Films, the acquisition of a majority stake in Wildstar Films had further extended Fremantle's growth in its documentary and natural production operations with them signing a partnership deal with Wildstar Films to distribute its future productions as Wildstar's co-founders Mark Linfield and Vanessa Berlowitz continued leading the Bristol-based production company under Fremantle. Another week later on the 22nd of that same month, Fremantle had expanded its Isarelian production operations with the acquisition of a majority stake in the Tel Aviv-based Israeli independent production company Silvio Productions.

In March 2023, Fremantle announced that their documentaries division had launched a premium feature series and documentaries label named Undeniable.

In May 2023, Fremantle announced that they're merging two of their Norwegian production companies with their Norwegian division Fremantle Norway being merged with Monster and will consolidate them into one company under the Monster label and will be led by the CEO of Monster Ingvild Daae with the CEO of Fremantle Norway Petter Testmann-Koch stepping down.

In February 2024, Fremantle announced their acquisition of Singaporean independent TV producer Beach House Pictures from Canadian entertainment company Blue Ant Media. Later in that same month, Fremantle announced that they had made a deal to acquire French-based global production studio Asacha Media Group with co-founder and CEO of Asacha, Gaspard de Chavagnac continuing to run the latter company.

In June 2024, Fremantle have signed a global FAST TV distribution partnership with the free ad-supported AVoD streaming television (FAST) service Pluto TV to bring Fremantle's global television programming library to 24 countries.

In April 2025, Fremantle entered the AI-powered production business with the establishment of its standalone production label dedicated to the power of AI called Imaginae Studios, the new production label Imaginae Studios would handle on pan-genre, standalone entertainment production business and would produce content using the AI powered technology as the new AI production label had appointed Fremantle's CCO and CEO of its European operations Andrea Scrosati to head the new AI production label as its president.

In December 2025, Fremantle had shuttered the production arm of its British production subsidiary Wag Entertainment as the latter's distribution arm Wag Worldwide continued to use the Wag name following Fremantle's acquisition of Wag Entertainment's previous French entertainment production group Asacha Media Group while Wag Entertainment's founding member & MD Steven Green and its co-founder Eliya Arman had left the closed production subsidiary meanwhile Wag's distribution division Wag Worldwide continues to be handle Wag's programming library as its president Janice Strangward continued leading the distribution unit while Fremantle continues to held Wag's library.

== Productions ==
Fremantle owns of a number of non-scripted formats, including the talent shows Idol, Got Talent, and The X Factor (the latter two with Simon Cowell's Syco Entertainment), and game shows via its ownership of the libraries of American producer Goodson–Todman Productions, Australian producer Reg Grundy, and others, which includes formats Family Feud, The Price Is Right and Sale of the Century among others.

Via the Reg Grundy library, Fremantle Australia owns a number of notable Australian dramas and soap operas, including the long-running Neighbours and Prisoner.

Since the mid-2010s, Fremantle has increased its focus on scripted series internationally, having produced or distributed programmes such as American Gods, Beecham House, Charité, Deutschland 83, Picnic at Hanging Rock, The Rain, The Young Pope and The Mosquito Coast.

== Production offices and labels ==
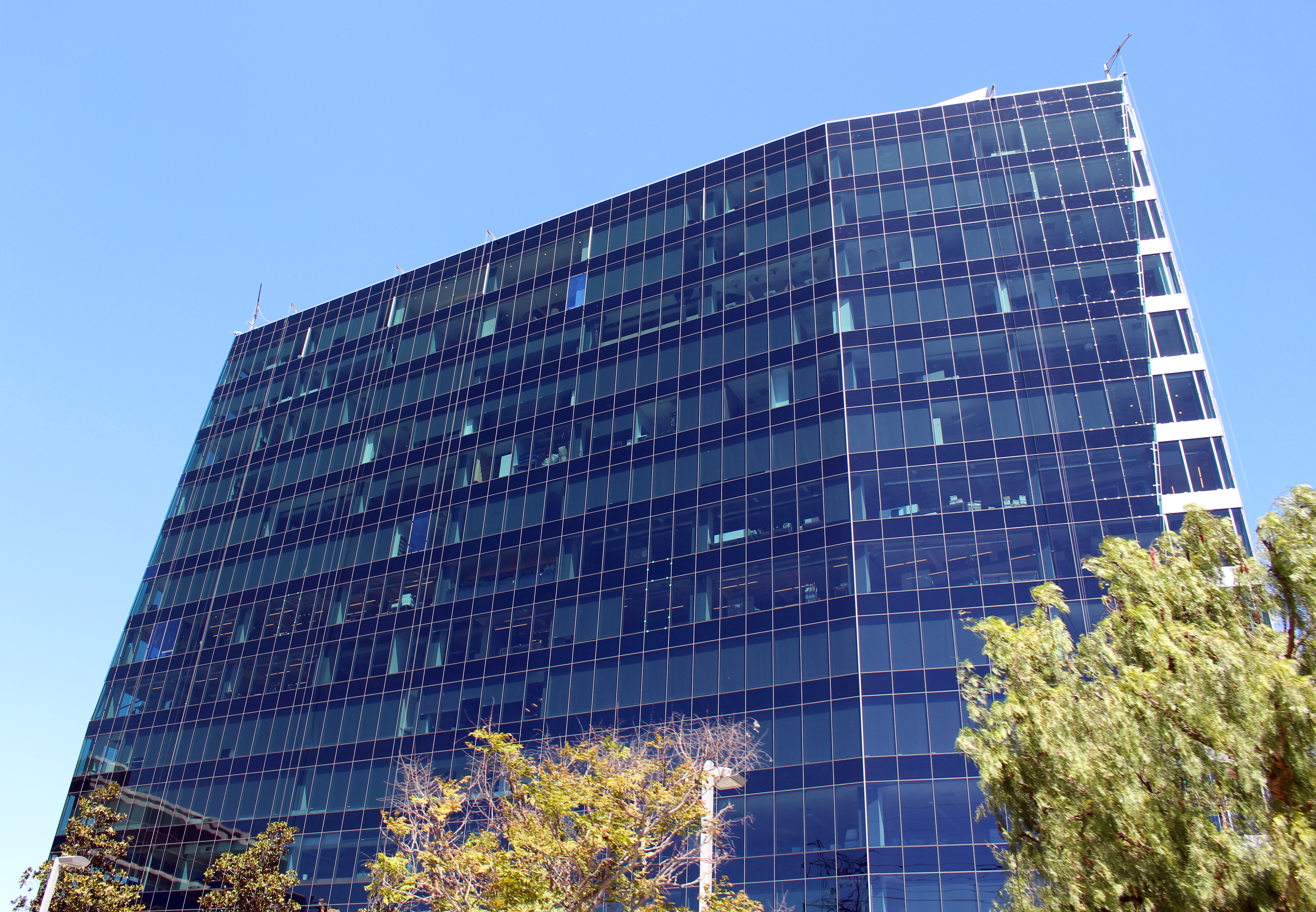
Fremantle North America headquarters at the Pointe office building in Burbank, California

Fremantle has production units across its global offices and network of companies.

In the United States, Fremantle's largest production and distribution division, Fremantle North America is based in Burbank, California, and includes a portfolio of companies. Fremantle North America produces and distributes scripted and alternative programs for broadcast and cable networks, syndication and streaming platforms.

In addition, Fremantle North America owns several other smaller production companies; among these are Thom Beers' Original Productions (responsible for creation and production of numerous reality shows such as Deadliest Catch, Ax Men, and Ice Road Truckers) and Amygdala Music, Leslie Beers' production and composition firm that writes themes, incidental, and featured music for Original Productions shows.

Production and distribution labels from Fremantle include:

List of production offices
Region/country	Unit(s)
United Kingdom	72 Films; Arrow Media; Boldpoint Studios; Dancing Ledge; Dr Pluto Films (25%; joint venture with James Abadi and Sam Pollard); Euston Films; Castlefield (Manchester and the rest of Northern England); Full Fat TV (25%); Label1 (25%); Man Alive Entertainment (25%); Naked Television (formed from merger of Boundless and Naked Entertainment); Naked West; Red Planet Pictures; Talkback Thames; Undeniable; Wag Worldwide; Wild Blue Media (25%); Wildstar Films (51%)
Ireland	Element Pictures (also has an office in London); Light House Cinema (Dublin); Road House Cinema; Pálás Cinema (Galway); Volta (Irish film VOD service)
United States	Original Productions; Amygdala Music; MAX POST; Random House Studio; Random House Films; Random House Television; Passenger (with Richard Brown); The Immigrant (also in Spain and Latin America; with Bron Media, Camila Jiménez-Villa and Silvana Aguirre; 25%); Artists, Writers & Artisans (with Lightspeed Venture Partners, Lupa Systems and SISTER); Eureka Productions (also in Australia); Buzzr (Digital broadcast television network)
Australia	Easy Tiger; Eureka Productions (also in the United States)
Germany	UFA GmbH; UFA Fiction; UFA Mitte; UFA Serial Drama; UFA Show & Factual; UFA Documentary
France	Kabo Family; Kwaï; Mintee Productions; Srab Films
Netherlands	Fiction Valley; Blue Circle; No Pictures Please (Netherlands; 100% ownership since 1 January 2020); Tebbernekkel
Belgium	A Team Productions
Italy	Lux Vide (70%); Picomedia; Stand By Me; Wildside; Vision Distribution (joint venture with Sky Italia, Cattleya, Lucisano Media Group, Palomar and Indiana Production); Vision Distribution International; The Apartment (created in December 2019); Wavy
Spain	En Cero Coma Producciones
Denmark	Blu; Miso Film; Strong Productions
Finland	Moskito Television; Grillifilms; Production House
Norway	Playroom Event; Monster AS; One Big Happy Family; Strix Television (also in Sweden)
Sweden	Strix Television (also in Norway); Baluba
Israel	Abot Hameiri (founded by Eitan Abot and Guy Hameiri in 2006, this company became part of Fremantle in 2016); Silvio Productions
Singapore	Beach House Pictures
Hungary	UFA Produkció
Former/Defunct	Talkback (United Kingdom); Thames (United Kingdom); Boundless (United Kingdom); Fontaram Productions (France); Hare and Tortoise (United Kingdom; known as Retort until 2018); Ludia (Canada; sold to Jam City); Prism Leisure Corporation (United Kingdom); Shotglass Media (United Kingdom); TV Presse Productions (France); Wag Entertainment (United Kingdom)
