= DIY SOS =

British TV series

- Also known as: DIY SOS (1999–2010, 2025–2026); DIY SOS The Big Build (2010–2022)
- Presented by: Nick Knowles
- Narrated by: Nick Knowles
- Country of origin: United Kingdom
- Original language: English
- No. of series: 35
- No. of episodes: 249 (list of episodes)

Production
- Executive producer: Sam Grace
- Producer: Claire Edwards
- Running time: 30 minutes (1999–2010); 60 minutes (2009–2026)
- Production companies: BBC Bristol (1999–2015); BBC Studios Factual Entertainment Productions (2016–2022); South Shore (2025–2026)

Original release
- Network: BBC One
- Release: 7 October 1999 – 27 October 2026

DIY SOS is a British DIY television series made for the BBC. It has been presented by Nick Knowles since 1999 and was broadcast until 2010, before changing format to DIY SOS: The Big Build. A total of 243 episodes of DIY SOS and DIY SOS: The Big Build have been broadcast over 33 series.

== DIY SOS (1999–2010) ==
Launched on 7 October 1999, after audience figures showed interest in other home makeover shows such as Changing Rooms, DIY SOS was a weekly full builder and designer level renovation of a section of a viewer's home, taken on by a team of professionals after a viewer's DIY project had gone wrong and not been finished. It is the longest running show of its format having been shown for 26 years and has an active dedicated forum.

Launched with presenter Nick Knowles, the format consisted of a main project, and a small project initially headed by Lowri Turner (but after Turner left the show, a number of subsequent presenters were used for the smaller segment), and a viewer call-in vote format voting for one of three families who have made short video pitches for their projects to be addressed in the following programme.

An episode filmed in June 2009 was not broadcast after a domestic incident where a man held his wife hostage at gunpoint before shooting himself, the week before the intended broadcast. The episode is believed to have included the fitting of a new kitchen into the couple's semi-detached home.

=== Personnel ===
==== Presenters ====
- Nick Knowles (1999–2010)
- Lowri Turner (1999–2006)
- Brigid Calderhead (2002–2006)
- Kate McIntyre (2003)

==== Designers ====
- Brigid Calderhead (2002–2006)
- Claire Rendall (2005)
- Deborah Drew (2003–2007)
- Julia Kendell (2008–2012)
- Laurence Llewelyn Bowen
- Gabrielle Blackman (2010)

==== Crew ====
- Julian Perryman – Builder (1999–2010)
- Chris Frediani – Plasterer (1999–Present)
- Mark Millar – Carpenter (2006–2010)
- Billy Byrne – Electrician (1999–2010)
- Ian Soo – Builder (1999–2006)
- Dawn Bayley – Decorator (1999–2006)
- Garfield Caven – Builder (1999–2006)
- Steve Fallowfield – Builder (1999–2006)
- Chris Young – Builder (1999–2006)
- Kyle Dwnt – Builder (1999–2006)
- Warren Furman – Builder (1999–2006)
- Bob Grose – Builder (1999–2006)
- Mat Skelton – Builder (2008–2010)

=== Episodes ===
Series	Episodes	Start date	End date
1	6	7 October 1999	18 November 1999
2	7	7 March 2000	25 April 2000
3	9	18 October 2000	13 December 2000
4	8	12 June 2001	31 July 2001
5	8	31 January 2002	21 March 2002
6	9	20 June 2002	29 August 2002
7	8	9 January 2003	6 March 2003
8	8	10 July 2003	28 August 2003
9	8	15 January 2004	10 March 2004
10	6	19 May 2004	19 August 2004
11	8	16 March 2005	11 May 2005
12	8	28 July 2005	26 September 2005
13	10	1 May 2006	17 July 2006
14	8	8 November 2006	2 March 2007
15	8	13 July 2007	19 November 2007
16	7	27 June 2008	15 August 2008
17	8	22 August 2008	10 October 2008
18	6	9 April 2009	14 May 2009
19	7	28 April 2010	16 June 2010

== DIY SOS: The Big Build (2010–2026) ==
In 2010, following the success of a pilot under the same name, the show was reformatted into an hour-long series titled DIY SOS: The Big Build, where the team now enlists the help of local tradesmen, suppliers and the larger community to help deserving families. As the title suggests, the projects often involve "ambitious" construction work such as building a loft conversion or extension.

In October 2015, The Big Build's "Veterans Village" special achieved a 34% audience share (with viewing figures of 9.6 million), the biggest in the series' history.

In June 2023, the BBC put the series up for tender as part of the company's "competitive tender" policy. In May 2024, it was announced that the Welsh-based South Shore had won the bid to produce the series. The show was retitled back to simply DIY SOS but retaining the "Big Build" format.

In October 2026, the BBC announced that the show would be rested in 2027 and that a new spin-off series would be aired in its place.

=== Personnel ===
==== Presenters ====
- Nick Knowles (2010–2026)
- Rhod Gilbert (one episode in 2021)

==== Crew ====
- Julian Perryman – Builder (2010–2021)
- Chris Frediani – Plasterer (2010–2026)
- Mark Millar – Carpenter (2010–2021)
- Billy Byrne – Electrician (2010–2026)
- Mat Skelton – Builder (2010–2013)
- Gabrielle Blackman – Designer (2010–2026)
- Radha Siyver - Woodworker (2024–2026)
- Ashley Edwards - Gardener (2024–2026)

==== Designers ====
During The Big Build, the following designers appear in an alternating recurring capacity.

- Charlie Luxton
- Laurence Llewelyn-Bowen
- Oliver Heath
- Hannah Huggins
- Nina Campbell
- Gabrielle Blackman
- Julia Kendell
- Naomi Cleaver
- Sophie Robinson

=== Episodes ===
Series	Episodes	Start date	End date
20	2	15 April 2010	1 July 2010
21	4	26 August 2010	26 January 2011
22	6	13 April 2011	16 August 2011
23	10	10 January 2012	15 October 2013
24	6	22 October 2013	30 May 2014
25	6	12 May 2014	21 October 2014
26	9	18 December 2014	17 December 2015
27	10	17 February 2016	29 March 2017
28	6	8 June 2017	15 November 2017
29	6	4 January 2018	17 January 2019
30	7	3 April 2019	11 December 2019
31	6	19 November 2020	17 May 2022
32	5	10 May 2022	14 June 2022
34	5	3 October 2025	30 December 2025
35	6	22 September 2026	27 October 2026

=== Reception ===
Following the transition to the Big Build format, according to Stuart Heritage of The Guardian, the show is now a "big hitter", explaining that "Pound for pound [it] offers far more emotional heft than almost anything else on television". In its previous format, the show had, in his view, merely "burbled along pointlessly", lacking ambition or an emotional connection with viewers.

== Garden SOS (2003) ==
On 7 July 2003, the BBC announced a sister show to DIY SOS, to be called Garden SOS. Running for only one series, it was first broadcast on BBC One from 4 September to 21 October 2003. Using the same format as DIY SOS, it was to tackle gardens instead of houses. Described by a reviewer as a hybrid between DIY SOS and Ground Force, the show featured a red and blue team of experts sent to work on different projects.

It was presented by television presenter Andy Collins and garden designer Ann-Marie Powell. As with DIY SOS, viewers were given the chance via a telephone vote to select the projects in each subsequent episode. Reviewing the first episode for the Radio Times, David Butcher described the series as "all good fun", but lacking in gardening related content, and suggested this was one garden makeover series too many in an increasingly saturated market. There were six episodes in total.

No.	Broadcast	Episode description
1.1	4 September 2003	Repair a botched attempt to join two gardens into one in Lancaster and rescue a garden in Enfield with a hole where a patio was planned
1.2	11 September 2003	Finish a garden project, started but abandoned by a gym enthusiast
1.3	18 September 2003	Repair a garden in Surrey, left in a mess after the owners had swapped houses with their daughter
1.4	25 September 2003	Finish Wendy and Nigel's attempt to create a vegetable garden in Tuxford, Nottinghamshire
1.5	2 October 2003	Resolve the conflicts between couple Liz and Ian caused by their garden
1.6	9 October 2003	Regenerate the garden of Raffles Community Centre in Carlisle

== International editions ==
The format was sold to RTÉ in Ireland in 2019, with episodes presented by Baz Ashmawy. The first series premiered on 18 October 2020 on RTÉ One.

== Controversy ==
In May 2021, it was reported that Nick Knowles was holding crisis talks with the BBC regarding his job as the main host of DIY SOS due to his appearance in a Shreddies TV advert, which violated BBC's commercial agreements and guidelines. A week later, the BBC announced that they have resolved the issue and Knowles will return to his DIY SOS role with filming to resume in the coming months and he was expected to be back on screens in 2022.
