= Victorian Plumbing =

British online retailer

Victorian Plumbing Limited
- Traded as: LSE: VIC
- Industry: Home improvement; Online shopping
- Founded: 2000
- Founder: Mark Radcliffe
- Headquarters: Leyland, Lancashire, United Kingdom
- Key people: Philip Bowcock (chair); Mark Radcliffe (CEO)
- Brands: MFI; Do It All (defunct); Focus DIY (defunct); Land of Leather (defunct); Payless DIY (defunct); Tile Giant (defunct); VictoriaPlum.com (defunct)
- Revenue: ▲£295.7 million (2024)
- Operating income: ▼£11.2 million (2024)
- Net income: ▼£5.5 million (2024)
- Website: victorianplumbing.co.uk; victorianplumbingplc.com

Victorian Plumbing Limited is a British online bathroom and kitchen retailer, founded in September 2000. The retailer also owns MFI.

In June 2021, it was listed on the London Stock Exchange's Alternative Investment Market (AIM).

== History ==
The company was founded by Mark Radcliffe from his parents' shed in Merseyside in September 2000.

In November 2016, the High Court of Justice ordered the company to pay £1.75 million to its online competitor, Victoria Plum, in a trademark dispute involving online advertising. Victoria Plum was a completely separate business founded in March 2001.

On 22 June 2021, the company floated on the Alternative Investment Market with a market capitalisation of £850 million. Its founder divested £212 million worth of shares, reducing his share to 46%. Radcliffe's brother and mother owned a 20% stake between them. At this time, the company employed approximately 540 people across its headquarters in Leyland and Skelmersdale, Lancashire, and its premises in Birmingham.

In May 2024, Victorian Plumbing acquired its online competitor Victoria Plum for £22.5 million, just over six months after Victoria Plum's pre-pack administration sale. The company closed the Victoria Plum website in October 2024.

In May 2025, it was announced that Victorian Plumbing would relaunch MFI, as the brand was included in its purchase of Victoria Plum.

== Sponsorship ==
On 6 June 2023, the company announced that it would become the principal shirt sponsor of EFL League One team Bolton Wanderers.

In 2024, Victorian Plumbing announced its involvement in snooker through a partnership with the World Snooker Tour. It also became the title sponsor of the UK Championship, one of the snooker's Triple Crown event.

In December 2025, The Bolton Wanderers deal was extended, ensuring Victorian Plumbing would continue to be Bolton's shirt sponsor until the end of the 2028–29 season.
