= St Columba's College, St Albans =

Catholic co-educational independent day school in St Albans, England

St Columba's College

Location
- King Harry Lane; St Albans, Hertfordshire, AL3 4AW; United Kingdom; 51°44′37″N 00°21′00″W

Information
- Type: Private day school
- Motto: Latin: Cor ad Cor Loquitur (Heart speaketh to heart)
- Religious affiliation: Roman Catholic
- Established: 1939
- Founder: Phillip O’Neil
- Local authority: Hertfordshire County Council
- Oversight: Roman Catholic Diocese of Westminster
- Department for Education URN: 117638 Tables
- Headmaster: Karl Guest
- Gender: Co-educational
- Age range: 4–18
- Enrolment: 750 (2022)
- Capacity: 865
- Houses: Charles; Guertin; Joseph; Martin; McClancy; Stanislaus; Prep school houses: Alban; Becket; Fisher; More
- Colours: Black, red and white
- Publication: Opus; The Columban
- Affiliation: Headmasters' and Headmistresses' Conference
- Alumni: Old Columbans
- Website: www.stcolumbascollege.org

St Columba's College is a co-educational 4–18 private, Catholic day school and sixth form in St Albans, Hertfordshire, England. It was founded in 1939 by Phillip O’Neil and taken over by the Brothers of the Sacred Heart in 1955. It is a member of the Headmasters' and Headmistresses' Conference.

Facing St Albans Cathedral across the River Ver, the college is built around two historic houses, Watling House and Iona House.

== History ==
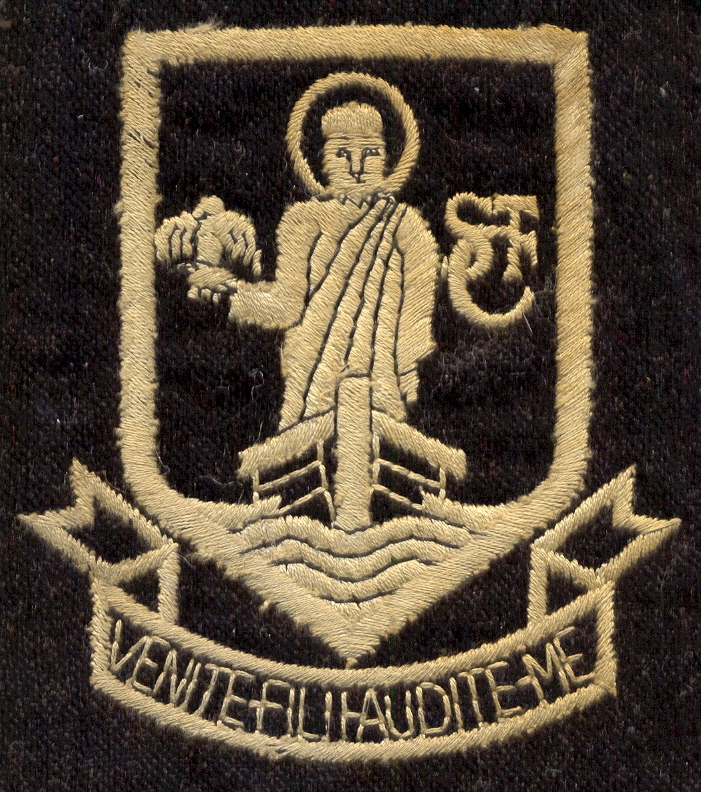
School uniform badge, circa 1971

Originally a boys'-only school, St Columba's College announced its move to co-education in June 2020, with the first girls being admitted as pupils in 2021. The school originally opened in 1939, on Beaconsfield Road before moving to its current site in 1948. In 1955, it was taken over by the Brothers of the Sacred Heart (New England Province) who also purchased the neighbouring Watling House and undertook major construction across the school site. St Columba's College also expanded to include a primary school, first named 'Sacred Heart Junior School' before being renamed to 'St Columba's College Preparatory School'. Since then they have continued to expand the facilities; building separate Sixth Form, English and Science & DT blocks. In 2013, the college completed a major building project, refurbishing the main school hall as-well as introducing new classrooms, meeting and seminar rooms, offices and a Fitness Suite. In 2021 the Sixth Form Centre was refurbished, creating new learning, collaboration and social spaces for the students. In 2022 the College is building new sports pitches.

== Curriculum ==
St Columba's College provides a broad curriculum linked to the national curriculum and also to Diocese of Westminster rules – mandating the teaching of Religious Studies for a set period every week. More than 20 subjects are offered at GCSE, including the core subjects of English (Literature and Language), Mathematics, Science and Religious Studies. Additional subjects offered at A Level include Drama & Theatre, Psychology and Sociology. Sixth Form students can also study towards gaining the Certificate of Financial Studies and the Extended Project Qualification (EPQ).

In 2021 St Columba's Prep School became a member school in the Pre-Senior Baccalaureate (PSB) group and has embedded the framework in the curriculum since September 2021.

== Notable alumni ==
Former pupils of the school are called Old Columbans.

- Sir Conor Burns MP, Member of Parliament for Bournemouth West, Minister of State for Northern Ireland and former Minister of State for International Trade.
- Bill Grimsey, CEO of Focus (DIY), formerly CEO of Wickes, The Big Food Group and Iceland.
- Noni Madueke, footballer
- Mark Lawson, broadcaster
- Mick Luckhurst, former American football player
- Jim McCaffrey, former professional footballer
- John Payne (singer), singer with rock band Asia
- Julian Perretta, singer-songwriter
- Saving Aimee, band
- Matt Ball, footballer
- Colin Grant, author
- Peter Townsend, golfer.
- Sacha Baron Cohen, actor, attended St. Columba's Prep School
