= Great Mills (DIY) =

DIY chain in the United Kingdom

- Type: Public company
- Industry: Retail; DIY
- Founded: 1972; 54 years ago
- Defunct: December 2000; 25 years ago
- Fate: Merged into Focus DIY
- Products: DIY Tools; Paint & decor; Outdoor living; Gardening
- Parent: RMC Group plc (1979–2000)

Great Mills was a British DIY retailer, consisting of around 98 stores across the United Kingdom. The business was bought by Focus DIY in December 2000 for £285m, who had also previously acquired rivals Payless DIY and Do It All.

== History ==
A Great Mills storefront

Originally known as Clapton Building Supplies, the first store at Paulton, Somerset in 1972 was officially opened by Tony Blackburn, an unwell Dulux Dog and a staff of four. The store had a modest turnover of £50,000 but within six months, the turnover had doubled.

In the beginning of the 1990s, Great Mills launched Bay6 (Basics). These stores were identical in size, look and layout to those of rival retailer Wickes. Wickes bought the six Bay6 stores in 1995 from Great Mills' parent company, RMC. Four were already trading, and two were under construction.

An important step forward for the company came in 1992, with the introduction of a new central distribution method of delivering products to its stores. This saved many motorway miles as deliveries were coordinated, rather than having hundreds of suppliers delivering to the same store each day.

Of the product range, over 70% was delivered by the Great Mills fleet in 2000 two or three times weekly.

Some of the worst-performing Great Mills stores, at St. Austell, Salisbury and Northallerton, were rebranded in 1994 into the No Frills DIY chain. Other than external signage saying No Frills, the interior of the stores followed no corporate planning as the concept was to sell anything and everything in an attempt to make the loss-making store profitable again. Only St. Austell got close to being in profit before the entire chain was shut with the sale of Great Mills. Whilst none of the stores made a profit before closure, they did significantly reduce their losses.

To further reduce distribution costs, a new Central Distribution Centre was opened in July 1997. The purpose-built development was fully automated and used computer systems to monitor stock control and to make sure deliveries were made on time to stores.

In May 1998, Great Mills appointed Jill Keen from Asda as marketing director, taking over from Peter Bastin.

=== Sale to Focus DIY ===
RMC Group put Great Mills up for sale in 2000, as chief executive Peter Young said the business "is not a core part of what we do". Later that year, the Great Mills business of circa 100 stores was acquired by Focus DIY, after they had abandoned a previous acquisition attempt of Homebase. The Great Mill stores were all externally rebranded to Focus DIY, though some stores retained parts of the interior Great Mills branding.

In 2011, Focus DIY itself entered administration. Some of the ex-Great Mills locations were sold off to other retailers, while others were left empty. The original Great Mill flagship store in Paulton stood empty until 2015, when it became an outlet for Wickes.
