= Payless DIY =

British DIY store chain

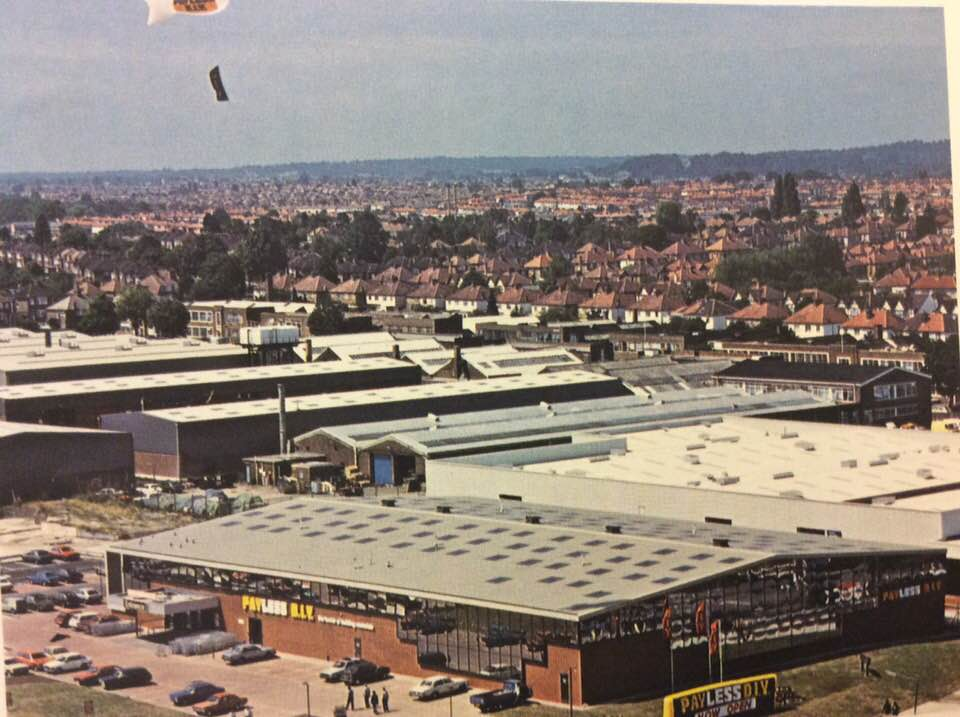
- A Payless DIY store in the 1980s
- Industry: Home improvement retailer
- Predecessor: Marley Homecare
- Founded: January 1, 1983; 43 years ago
- Defunct: 1998; 28 years ago
- Fate: Folded into Do It All
- Successor: Do It All

Payless DIY was a chain of DIY stores in the United Kingdom during the 1980s.

== History ==
The name was first used from 1 January 1983 to rebrand the Marley Homecare chain. The change was done under the chairmanship of Tom O'Sullivan, MD Ted Lansdowne and Merchandising Director Doug Spickernell to counter public perception of the Marley name as good, reliable but expensive. The transformation was inspired by the model adopted by Wickes in the US, i.e. larger stocks of trade-related goods, particularly timber and building lines, and a classic "pile it high, sell it cheap" approach. Not just a PR move, prices to the public were slashed across the board and attracted many jobbing builders who could buy at the same prices offered by builders' merchants. The strategy was a great success with average stores' turnover rising between 20% and 33% in the following year. By 1989, Payless was the UK's third largest DIY chain, with sales of £230m.

=== Early years ===
Marley Homecare was part of the Marley Group, which included the Marley Tile Company, Marley Extrusions, Marley Roofing and Marley Floors. Starting initially as Marley Retail Limited, the first High Street shop opened in Southampton in 1959. Marley was the first company to bring DIY to UK High Streets. The head office was situated in South Park, Sevenoaks, close to the manufacturing bases at Lenham and Riverhead. The chain of shops (300 across the UK at its peak), in the 1960s were solely outlets for Marley products; sheet and tile flooring, adhesives, wall ceramics, extruded roofing sheets, rainwater and plumbing goods and carpets from the Marley owned West Of England Carpets. Carpet and hard flooring installation was also provided. The range diversified in 1970 to include third-party items, and in 1972 starting with Ramsgate, superstores were added with a much larger range of materials. The initial phase used premises such as converted car sales showrooms, mostly in High Street locations. As the formula became increasingly popular with the public and Britain enjoyed a DIY boom in the '80s, new-builds were commissioned on trading estates where much larger premises could be built and garden centres could be incorporated. The High Street shops were gradually closed.

In 1985, Marley decided to concentrate on their manufacturing businesses and sold Payless DIY to the Ward White Group. Ward White which also owned Halfords, injected extra funds for expansion and left the existing board in place. Ted Lansdowne M.D. who had started as a sales assistant in the Southampton shop in 1959 became CEO and the board consisted of Mike Nicholson managing director and directors Roger Napleton (IT), John Hood (Finance), Peter Ballard (Property), Doug Spickernell (Merchandising), Alan Harper (Marketing) and Steve Williams (Operations).

In 1987 Payless bought thirteen stores in the North and West of England and Wales from Paul Madeley (an ex-professional footballer). The Madeley staff and field management were retained and the stores were rebranded as Payless.

=== Merger with Do It All ===
In 1991, Ward White was bought by the Boots Group. Boots negotiated a merger of Payless with W.H.Smith's Do It All chain. The Payless Sevenoaks head office (which had relocated from South Park to Suffolk Way) was closed and the Do It All premises in Falcon House, Dudley, West Midlands became the headquarters for the new chain. Payless and WH Smith references were dropped and the merged chain became simply Do It All. The combined store portfolio had some overlaps and spare and unprofitable stores were offloaded, usually to competitors such as Focus DIY, Great Mills and B&Q.

Do It All was marketed to appeal mainly to female consumers and interior designers with slicker advertising and instore design. Payless core products at the heavy end, i.e. building and timber products, were no longer promoted. The jobbing builder market was lost to the new UK Wickes chain. Following poor trading, WH Smith extricated itself from the merger and then Boots sold Do It All to Focus DIY in 1998.
