= Homebase =

Former British DIY retail chain

- Industry: Home improvement and garden centre retailer
- Founded: 3 March 1981
- Defunct: 22 March 2025
- Fate: Administration
- Products: DIY tools; Paint & decor; Outdoor living; Kitchens; Bathrooms; Gardening

Homebase was a British home improvement and garden centre retailer that operated across the United Kingdom and Ireland.

It was founded by British supermarket chain Sainsbury's and Belgian retailer GB-Inno-BM in March 1981, as Sainsbury's Homebase. By the end of the 1980s, it opened its 50th store, making it the UK's fourth biggest home improvement retailer.

The retailer purchased rival Texas Homecare in January 1995, which helped grow its market share to third place, behind B&Q and Focus-Wickes. In 1999, it was renamed Homebase, and then sold to Schroder Ventures in December 2000. In November 2002, it was sold to Argos Retail Group, which later became Home Retail Group in October 2006.

In January 2016, Wesfarmers purchased Homebase in a botched attempt to convert the stores to its Bunnings Warehouse format, ultimately losing £1 billion in total. In August 2018, Homebase was sold to restructuring firm Hilco for £1. Subsequently, Hilco announced that it would close 42 of the chain's stores, and cut 1,500 jobs through a company voluntary arrangement (CVA). By February 2020, Homebase had 164 outlets and had returned to profitability earlier than expected, with Hilco listing the retailer for sale in November 2020.

In November 2024, Hilco placed Homebase into administration with 3,446 jobs and 135 stores at risk. CDS Superstores acquired the Homebase website, brand, and 49 of its stores to convert as The Range. Twelve of the remaining stores in the UK and Ireland were acquired by rivals B&Q and Wickes, while the remainder were closed. The final four original Homebase stores closed down in March 2025.

== History ==
=== Sainsbury's ownership ===
Homebase's concept was created by the supermarket chain Sainsbury's and Belgian retailer GB-Inno-BM in 1979. The goal was to bring a supermarket style layout to the British do it yourself (DIY) market. The first actual store was in Croydon, opening on 3 March 1981, located on Purley Way, originally as Sainsbury's Homebase.

Early in its history, Homebase used its Sainsbury's experience to move into using central warehouses from which to deliver its stock. By the 1990s, it was receiving the vast majority of its stock into central warehouses, then delivering it to stores.

Homebase tripled in size in January 1995, when Sainsbury's bought rival store group Texas Homecare from Ladbrokes. These stores were rebranded and converted to the Homebase format, beginning in February 1996 with the store in Longwell Green, Bristol. The transformation was completed by 1999. At the time of the purchase, Texas had staff totalling 11,600, and Homebase had 4,500.

In October 1999, Sainsbury's bought Hampden Group, the franchisee of 10 Homebase stores in Ireland.

From 1999, Homebase used former Men Behaving Badly actors Neil Morrissey and Leslie Ash as the face of the brand (portraying them as a couple) for six years, until March 2005.

In August 2000, the former chief executive of Texas Homecare, Ron Trenter, made an ultimately unsuccessful bid for Homebase. In September 2000, Focus Do It All considered acquiring Homebase, but instead decided to acquire Great Mills. The next month, Home Depot joined the race to acquire Homebase, but was not successful.

=== Schroder Ventures ownership ===
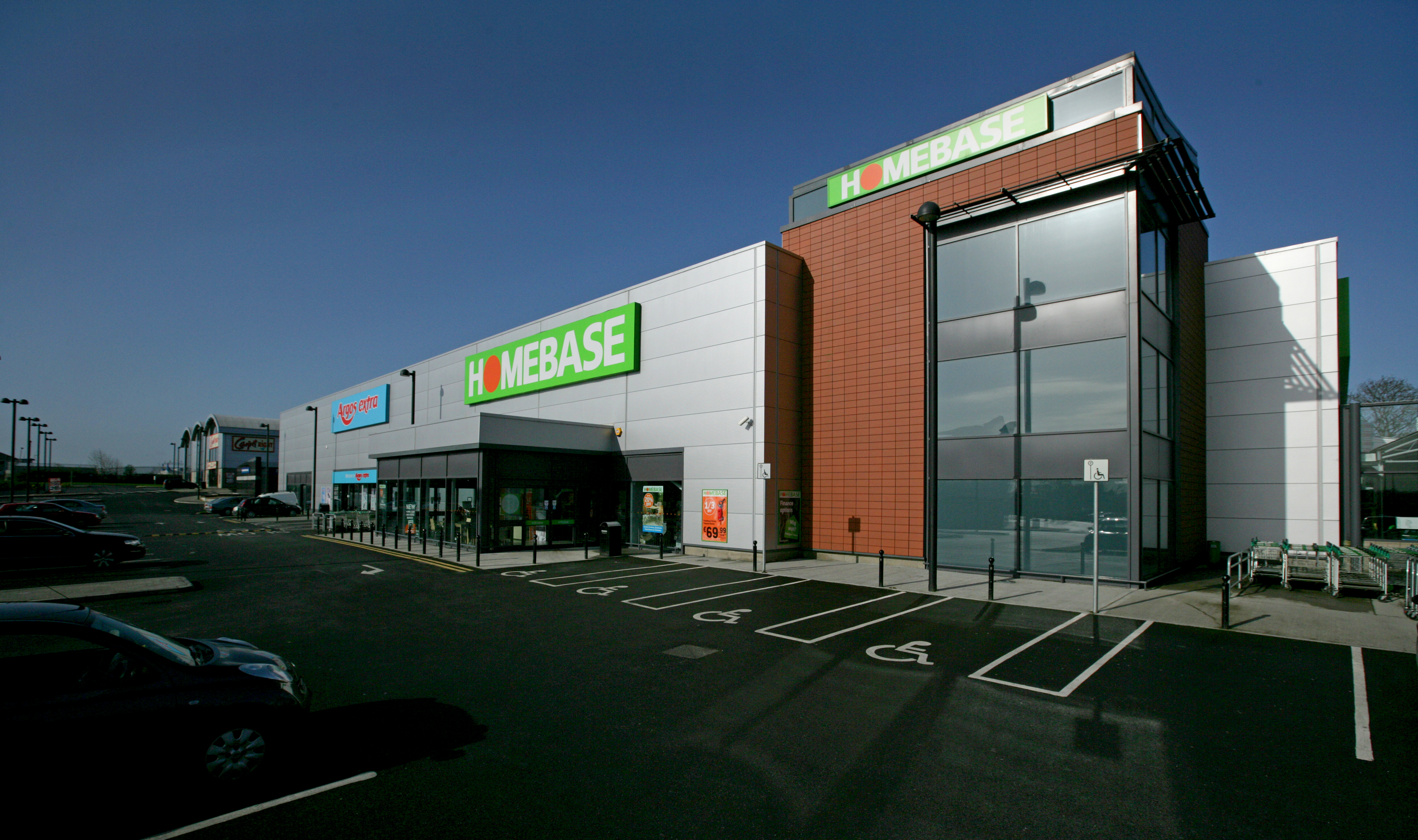
A branch of Homebase in Longford, Ireland.

On 22 December 2000, Sainsbury's sold the Homebase chain in a two-part deal worth £969 million: in March 2001, the sale of the chain of 283 stores to venture capitalist Schroder Ventures generated £750 million, and the sale of 28 development sites to Kingfisher plc, parent of Homebase rival B&Q, generated £219 million. At the time, the chain had 13% of the market in the United Kingdom, with 283 stores and 17,000 employees, behind B&Q and Focus Do It All.

=== Argos / Home Retail Group ownership ===
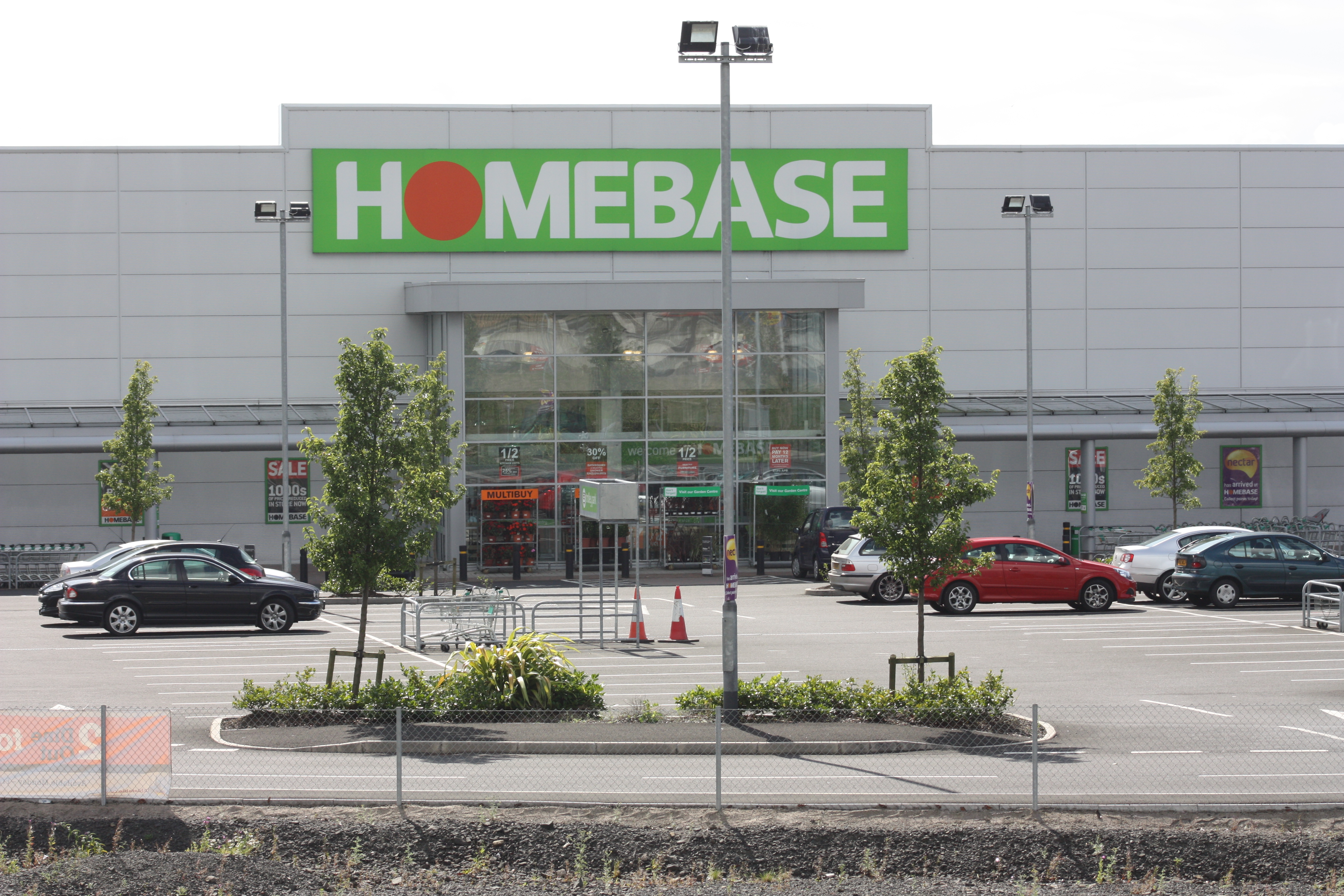
A branch of Homebase in Antrim, Northern Ireland.

In November 2002, Homebase was sold to Argos Retail Group (ARG), a subsidiary of GUS plc, for £900 million. In October 2006, GUS demerged Experian and changed the name of Argos Retail Group to Home Retail Group.

In March 2005, Homebase launched a series of new television advertisements created by AMV BBDO, featuring the new slogan "Make a house a home." From 2005 to 2008, these adverts used the song "Love Machine" by Girls Aloud. From 2007 to 2008, "Orinoco Flow" by Enya was used. From 2009 to 2013, "Young Folks" by Peter Bjorn and John featuring Victoria Bergsman was used.

In October 2007, Home Retail Group agreed the purchase of 27 leasehold properties from Focus DIY, to be bought for £40 million in cash. The properties were transferred over the period up to 31 December 2007, and were then refitted to the Homebase fascia over the course of several months.

No other infrastructure, and no merchandise stock were acquired as part of the transaction, although staff in these Focus stores transferred to Homebase.

In May 2009, Homebase discontinued its loyalty programme, the Spend & Save Card, and replaced it with the Nectar loyalty card scheme, the United Kingdom's largest retail loyalty card. The Spend & Save card had been operated by Homebase since 1982, and was one of the first store loyalty cards in the world.

In July 2013, Home Retail Group said the stores in Ireland had not made a profit in the previous five years, and that it intended to close three of the 15.

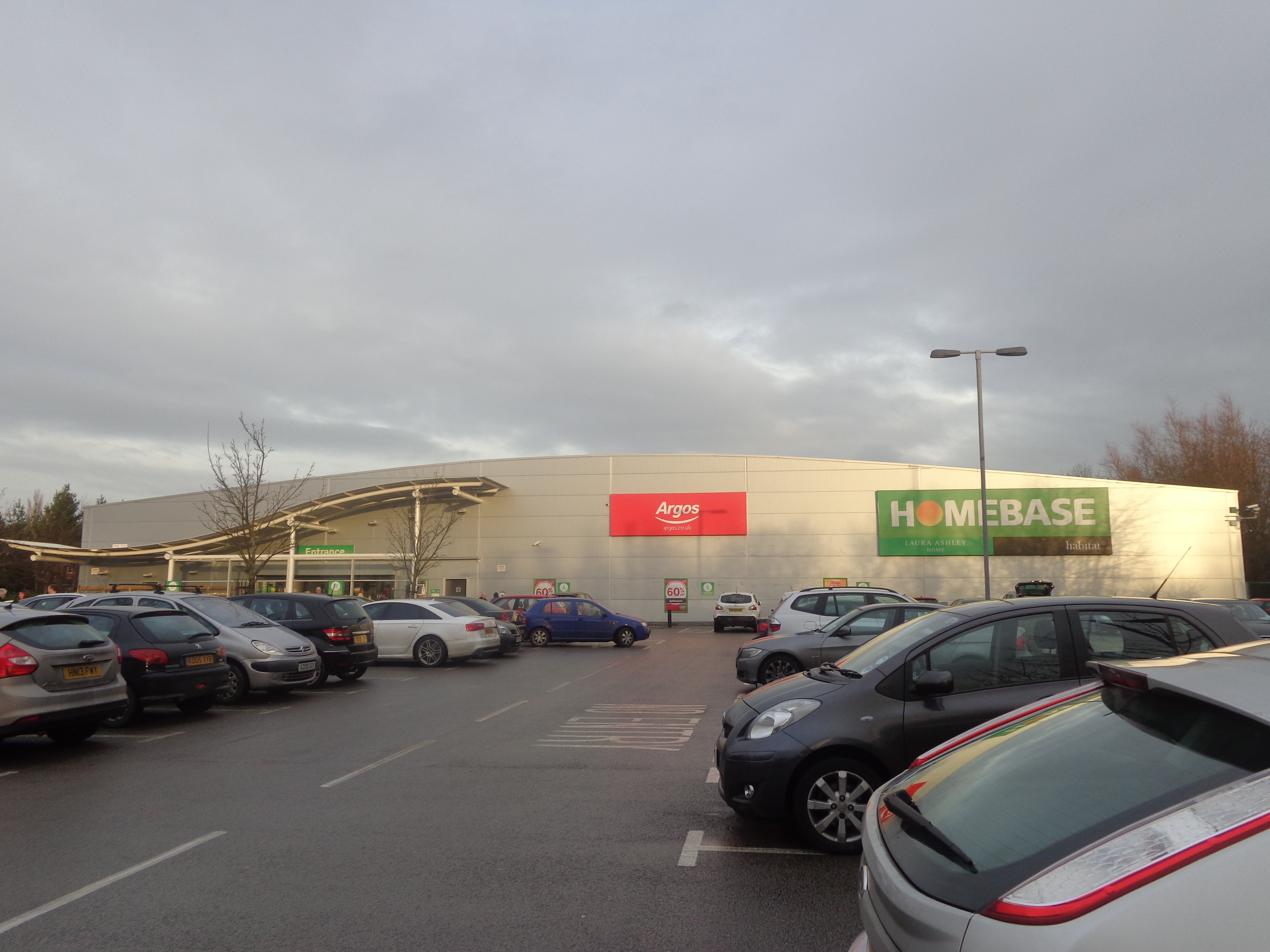
A branch of Homebase in Leeds, inclusive of an Argos concession. This hybrid format had been introduced in 2014.

In April 2013, Homebase faced criticism over a poster in a London store. The poster appeared to highlight the benefits of free labour through work experience, called Workfare. The offending poster depicted a number of volunteer staff at the Haringey branch and was captioned: "How the work experience programme can benefit your store. Would 750 hours with no payroll costs help YOUR store?" Homebase responded that "Any individual involved in work experience is provided with a training plan to help them understand the different parts of the store operation in order to help them go on to secure a job (either within our business or elsewhere). We ensure they work alongside, not replace, paid colleagues. They are entirely under no obligation to participate, nor will non participation affect any benefits."

In May 2014, Homebase launched the Homebase Design Centres. The new look stores had a Decorating Ideas and Advice Centre, offering touch screen technology, to help customers transform the look of rooms in their homes.

Following a review of the business, Home Retail Group announced in October 2014 that it would close around a quarter of Homebase stores by 2019, and that it would increase the number of Argos and Habitat concessions within the stores. In April 2015, former Tesco executive Echo Lu succeeded Paul Loft as managing director.

=== Wesfarmers ownership ===
On 18 January 2016, it was announced that Australian retailer Wesfarmers, owner of Australia's leading hardware store Bunnings, would acquire Homebase for £340 million, subject to shareholder approval. The transfer of ownership to Wesfarmers took place on 27 February 2016 and afterwards Peter Davis was appointed managing director, replacing Echo Lu.

Wesfarmers announced in June 2016 that it had cancelled the plans by Home Retail Group to close seven stores, and would seek to prevent the closure of 11 others. It described the closure of five additional stores as "unavoidable". It was also announced that Archie Norman was to advise on the turnaround of Homebase under Wesfarmers.

Laura Ashley plc confirmed in October 2016 that it would remove its concessions trading in 22 Homebase stores by the second quarter of 2017, as Wesfarmers sought to remove all concessions and adopt the same business model as its Australian and New Zealand business.

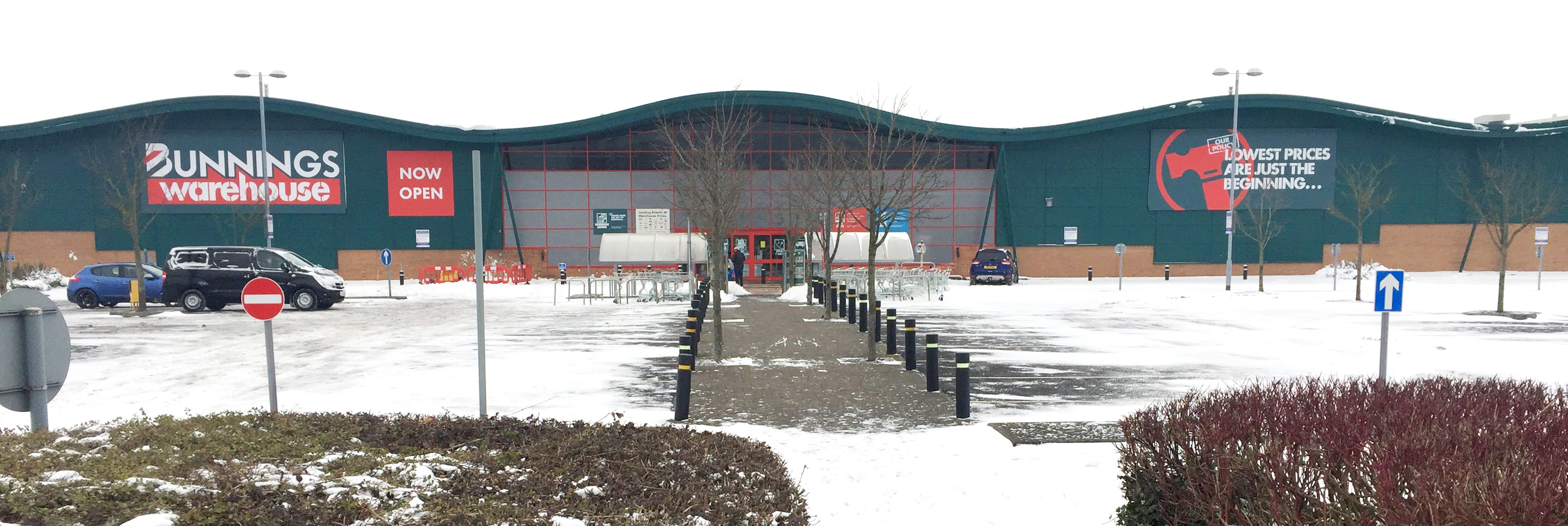
A branch in Worle, Somerset that had been converted from Homebase to the Bunnings Warehouse format.

The company moved its headquarters within Milton Keynes in December 2016, from premises previously shared with former sister company Argos.

Following the sale to Wesfarmers, Homebase left the Nectar loyalty card scheme on 31 December 2016.

Bunnings confirmed in November 2016 that the Homebase store in St Albans would be the first to be re-branded as Bunnings Warehouse as part of a trial, and opened in February 2017. An additional three were planned to be opened by June 2017, with up to six more completed by the end of the year. The stores adopted a low-cost warehouse model.

In February 2018, Wesfarmers reported losses relating to the takeover of £57 million in the year to June 2017, and stated that it would begin a review of the business. Wesfarmers sought buyers for the business in March, and by May, had received bids from restructuring firms Alteri Investors and Hilco.

=== Hilco ownership ===
On 25 May 2018, it was announced that Homebase had been sold by Wesfarmers to turnaround specialists Hilco, for a nominal £1. Hilco took ownership of the business on 12 June 2018 through a new holding company, HHGL Limited. All 24 stores converted to the Bunnings format were rebranded back to Homebase. At the end of August 2018, a company voluntary arrangement (CVA) proposed by Hilco to close 42 stores, and reduce rent on others, was approved by Homebase's creditors.

The stores identified for closure in the CVA were planned to close by the beginning of 2019. Homebase secured a £95 million asset lending contract with Wells Fargo Capital Finance on 26 November 2018.

On 24 December 2018, Hilco opened its first redesigned store nicknamed BoB (Best of Both) in Orpington. The store featured traditional Homebase "gondola" shelving alongside the Bunnings red racking, with a heavy focus on decorating, moving away from Wesfarmers' primary focus on tools. At that time Homebase had over 170 stores in the United Kingdom, with a further 11 in Ireland.

In February 2020, it was announced that Homebase had returned to profit earlier than initially forecast, with nearly all of its 164 locations profitable. The company said that its overhauled website, and the reintroduction of in-store concessions (many of which had been removed by Wesfarmers) had helped it to achieve the reprise. Homebase confirmed that it would exit its CVA earlier than planned by April 2020. In November 2020, Hilco put Homebase up for sale. In 2021, Hugh Osmond was understood to have been assembling a takeover bid for Homebase for £300 million.

In February 2024, Hilco put Homebase up for sale for the second time within four years. In the same month, it was reported that Homebase had made heavy losses in the previous year, with Hilco continuing to look for a buyer, and that B&M European Value Retail and CDS (Superstores International) (owner of The Range and Wilko) had been approached regarding takeover deals. In July 2024, it emerged that CDS had approached Hilco Capital regarding a Homebase takeover deal, with an insider revealing that a formal sale process was due to begin within the next few days. In August 2024, Hilco sold 10 Homebase locations to Sainsbury's for £130 million, to be converted into supermarkets.

=== Administration and closure ===
On 13 November 2024, it was reported that Hilco was preparing to place the business into administration, with the retailer's holding company, HHGL Ltd, collapsing into administration on the same day. It was quickly announced that CDS Superstores would acquire the Homebase brand, website and 49 stores to convert to The Range, safeguarding about 1,500 jobs.

On 23 November 2024, it was reported that administrators had set a deadline of 29 November 2024 to sell the remaining 74 stores to other chains, with a reported 2,000 jobs at risk.

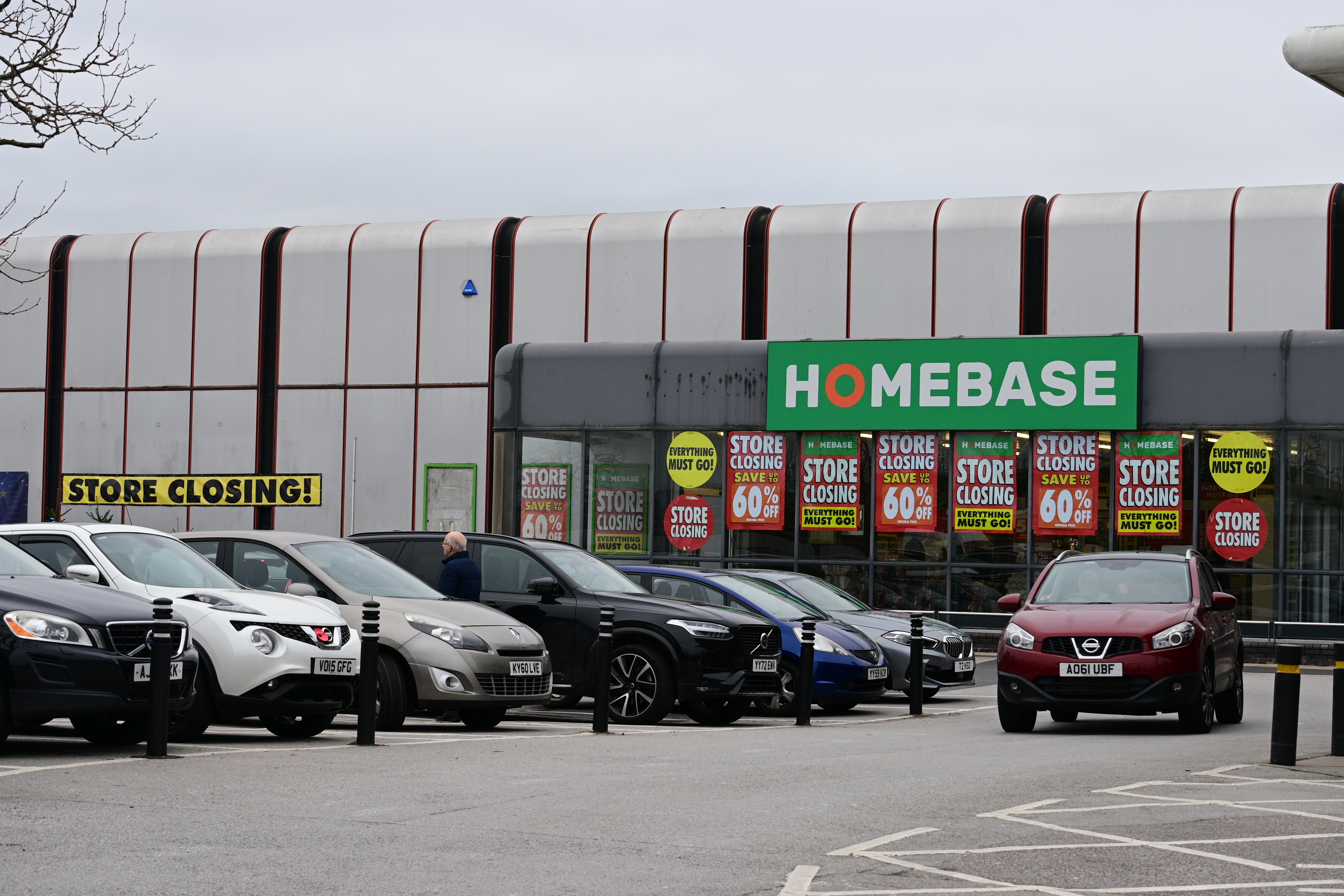
A branch in Hessle, Yorkshire, during a closing-down sale

On Christmas Eve 2024, it was announced that B&Q would purchase and convert three Homebase stores in the Republic of Ireland. On 6 January, it was announced that B&Q had purchased another five stores in Altrincham, Basingstoke, Biggleswade, Leamington Spa and Worcester. On 28 February, it was announced that Wickes would acquire four UK Homebase leases, including one store that had already closed.

The final day of trading for the four remaining original Homebase stores was 22 March 2025. The remaining four original stores to close were Bishop's Stortford, Frome, Market Harborough and Sevenoaks. All of these stores were converted as The Range not long afterwards.

== Legacy ==
On 26 June 2025, BBC Radio 4 broadcast a 25-minute documentary about Homebase as part of its Toast series about defunct businesses.
