= Thorp Arch Trading Estate =

Industrial park in West Yorkshire, England

Coordinates: 53.916°N 1.319°W

Thorp Arch Trading Estate is a trading estate, with both industrial and retail space, 3 miles (5 km) south-east of Wetherby in the City of Leeds metropolitan borough, West Yorkshire, England. The estate occupies the major part of the site of a former Royal Ordnance Factory (ROF), ROF Thorp Arch, in the parishes of Thorp Arch and Walton. There is evidence of its former use around the site which was similar in layout to the former ROF Aycliffe in Darlington, County Durham.

== War years ==
The Royal Ordnance Factory was built to supply British forces with munitions during the Second World War. The site was ideal: it had a railway running adjacent (the Harrogate to Church Fenton Line), open space and was not in a strategic bombing area. Railways sidings were built (these are still evident in certain areas) and buildings constructed around them, many with flat concrete roofs. The retail park is constructed in semi-underground bunkers, with grassy banks running up the sides of the buildings.

== Post war development ==
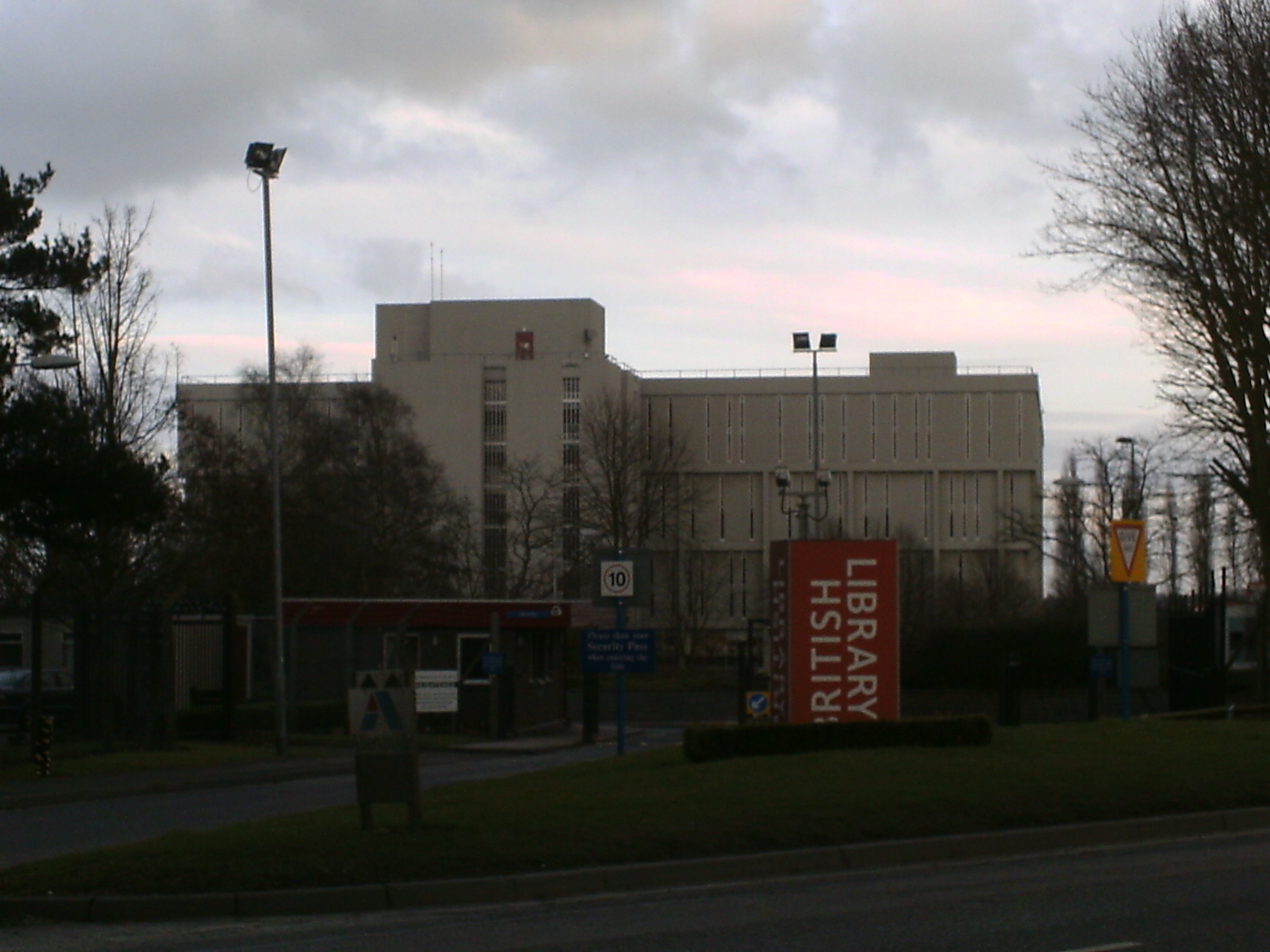
British Library

The Royal Ordnance Factory closed in 1957. However, with a boom in the construction trade and many others in the post-war years, the site found many new industries requiring the space it could offer.

George Moore (founder of Moores Furniture Group) bought the site in 1960s and converted it into a trading estate. Moores Furniture Group's furniture factory is situated on the estate. Moores Furniture Group was founded in 1947, and went into administration in 2026. The group employed over 450 people, and made kitchen furniture that they supplied to both public and private-sector housebuilders.

The site also contains Leeds City Council household recycling centre, a sewage works and many other small businesses situated.

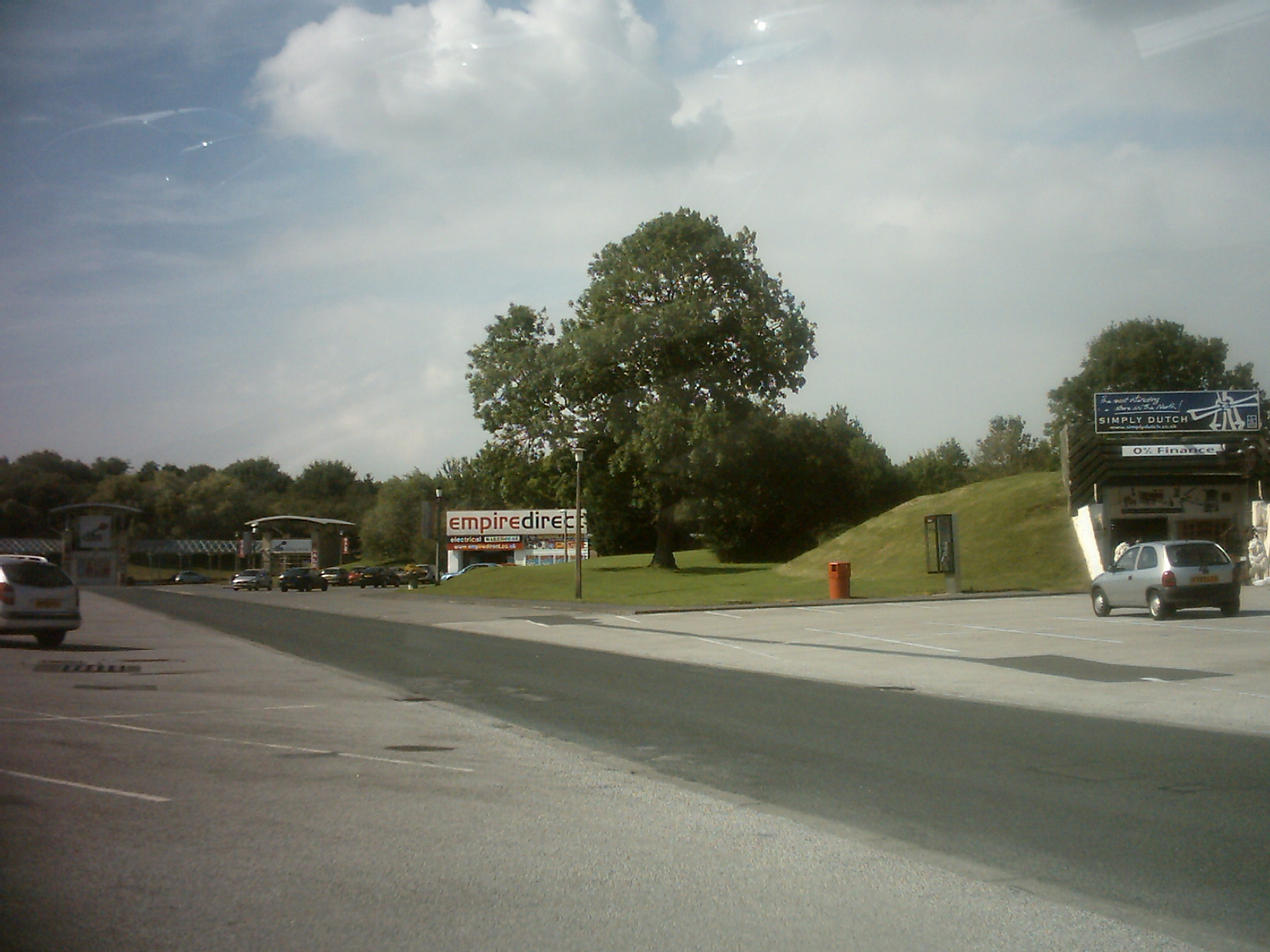
The Buywell Retail Park on the trading estate

The Thorp Arch Retail Park occupies semi-underground bunkers and many of the retail outlets have grassy banks up the exterior walls.

The retail park had a branch of Texas Homecare, but because of the small-sized units, it occupied two units several hundred yards apart but they were closed. Bargain Street, (a now defunct West Yorkshire discount clothes and household good retailer) also had premises.

During the 2008–2009 UK retail crisis, two retail chains, Land of Leather and Empire Direct, closed.

== British Library ==
A major development, and the biggest employer, is the British Library lending division, the British Library's second site after the St Pancras site in Central London. The British Library Boston Spa, as it is known, is housed in a large eight-storey concrete building (with windows set in narrow slits to avoid light damage to the books) and many smaller, newer buildings around it. The campus is the library's largest store, holding over three-quarters of its collection of more than 170 million items and making it the principal repository for the United Kingdom's national library. The collection grows by around 8 km (5.0 mi) of new shelving each year, and a new automated storage building was under construction in the 2020s to provide further capacity. The site is also the home of the British Library Document Supply Service, the library's national and international document-delivery operation, which traces its origins to the National Lending Library for Science and Technology established at Boston Spa in the 1960s. Low-use material transferred from the library's London building is held in automated stores at Boston Spa and returned to the London reading rooms on request by a daily shuttle service.

Following the closure of the newspaper library at Colindale, north London, on 8 November 2013, the British Library's newspaper collection – around 750 million pages of newspapers and periodicals dating from the 18th century onwards – was rehoused at Boston Spa in a purpose-built National Newspaper Building. The almost airtight, low-oxygen stores keep the newsprint at a constant temperature and humidity, with items retrieved by robotic cranes and delivered either to the on-site reading room or to the newsroom at the library's St Pancras headquarters. A reading room at Boston Spa gives researchers access to the stored and digitised collections.

== Features ==
- The street names are all uniform, with roads running in a north–south direction named "Street 1", "Street 2", "Street 8", etc., and those crossing them named "Avenue A", "Avenue B", etc.
- Running along the sixty-year-old lamp posts on certain parts of the estate are electricity cables.
- The retail park is set in grass covered bunkers.
- There are level crossings on certain streets, despite the railway being dismantled since 1965.
- The retail park is home to a playground, formerly home to an old tank, a Bren Gun Carrier and a fire engine, and is still home to a large mock pirate ship (about 40' in height).
