= Crescent Link Retail Park =

Retail Park in County Londonderry, Northern Ireland

Coordinates: 54.99850°N 7.27394°W

Crescent Link Retail Park is a retail park located in the East side of Derry, Northern Ireland. It is located on the east side of the A514, which itself is named Crescent Link and the name given to the retail park. The development is located 3 miles (4.8 km) from the centre of the city centre. It is the largest retail park of its kind in County Londonderry, with a large representation of multi-national retailers, such as Boots,Marks & Spencer, Tesco, Homebase, B&M, The Range and Currys

== First phase ==
The first phase was built to the northern side of the development, which saw ten units built in the early 2000s. These units housed both established Derry stores and stores new to the city; Such as Homebase, Currys, PC World, Reid Furniture, Sleepmasters, Carpet Right, McDonald's, Subway, Starbucks and First Trust Bank.

In August 2024 Sainsbury's announced it would take over the Homebase store and convert it into a supermarket. It has been submitted into planning permission as of September 2025

== Second phase ==
The second phase saw the development expand to the southern reaches of the site, with the further addition of eight units. These now house Toys "R" Us, Halfords, Argos Extra, JJB, Maplin, Pets at Home, M&S Simply Food, Tesco Express, and the now defunct MFI and Land of Leather. MFI was replaced by Next Home at the end of 2009, with Mothercare also opening in the Park.

The Derry Journal announced on 1 September 2010 that Boots had lodged plans to take over unit 15.
