= Bill Archer (businessman) =

British businessman

- Born: William Ernest Archer
- Occupation: Businessman

William Ernest Archer is a British businessman.

== Career ==
In 1988 the Focus DIY company was bought by Archer and all stores were re-branded Focus DIY. With the help of private equity the chain grew to 72 stores in the United Kingdom.

By 2002 the chain had grown to over 450 stores following several buyouts including the Wickes DIY chain. Archer and his partners received over £650 million from the sale of Wickes in 2005. When his core Focus business was in financial difficulty, US private equity firm Cerberus Capital Management bought Focus for £1 in June 2007. Cerberus, which also took on debts of £180m, brought in Bill Grimsey, former chief executive of Wickes. "When we came in, staff morale had been wiped out and the shelves had no stock because suppliers thought it was going bust. The business was still selling eight-year-old kitchens because there had been no investment," said Grimsey.

== Brighton & Hove Albion F.C. ==
Archer was also involved in the controversial 1997 sale of the Goldstone Ground in Hove, the then-home of Brighton & Hove Albion F.C., so the land could be used as a retail park. The club had been based there for over ninety years until the board of directors decided to sell the stadium. The sale, implemented by Archer as majority shareholder and his chief executive David Bellotti, provoked widespread protests against the board. The club itself received minimal payment from this sale, and was left without a ground to play in. He was also said to have destroyed Brighton and Hove Albion for a period.
