= David Quayle =

British businessman (1936–2010)

- Born: 19 August 1936; Banbury, Oxfordshire, England
- Died: 6 April 2010 (aged 73); At sea, near South Africa
- Education: Brighton College
- Occupation: Businessman
- Known for: Co-founder of B&Q
- Spouses: Rosemary Ann Block (m. 1959); Chrissie Quayle (before 2010, his death)
- Children: 6
- Relatives: Richard Block (brother-in-law)

David Andrew Quayle (19 August 1936 – 6 April 2010) was a British businessman best known as co-founder of the UK-based DIY chain B&Q.

== Biography ==
Quayle was born in Banbury, Oxfordshire and went to school at Brighton College in 1950. He returned to the school to be a governor in the 1990s.

Quayle worked in the Marley Tile company in the 1960s and together with his brother-in-law Richard Block started the B&Q retail chain in 1969 in Southampton. Their idea of large warehouse-style DIY stores copied the style already successfully operating in other European countries, but B&Q soon filled the gap in the British market to become the largest retail supplier of DIY products in the United Kingdom.

He left B&Q in 1982 and moved on to other companies, working in Television South, City Vision, Ritz Video, Granada Group and founded the Beatrice Royal Contemporary Art and Craft Gallery in Eastleigh in 1999.

Whilst on holiday with his second wife Chris, Quayle died at sea unexpectedly on 6 April 2010 on a cruise ship holiday off the coast of South Africa.
