= Focus DIY =

Defunct British home improvement and DIY retailer

- Industry: DIY
- Founded: December 1987; 38 years ago
- Defunct: July 2011; 15 years ago
- Number of locations: 178 stores (2002)
- Area served: United Kingdom
- Owner: AHK Designs Ltd (trademarks)
- Number of employees: 3,000 (2002)

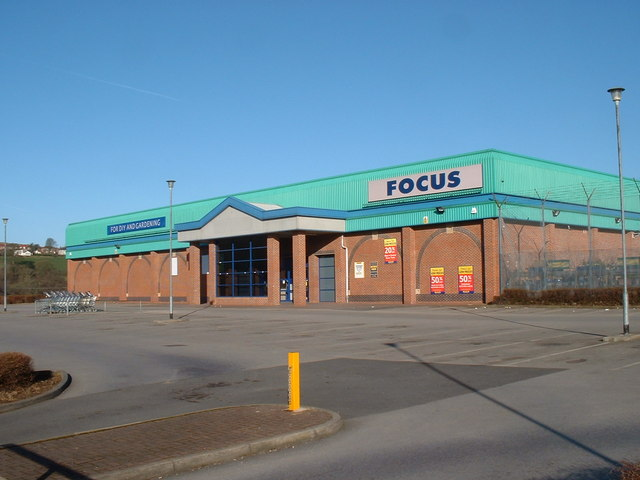
Focus DIY, Belper, Derbyshire (2005)

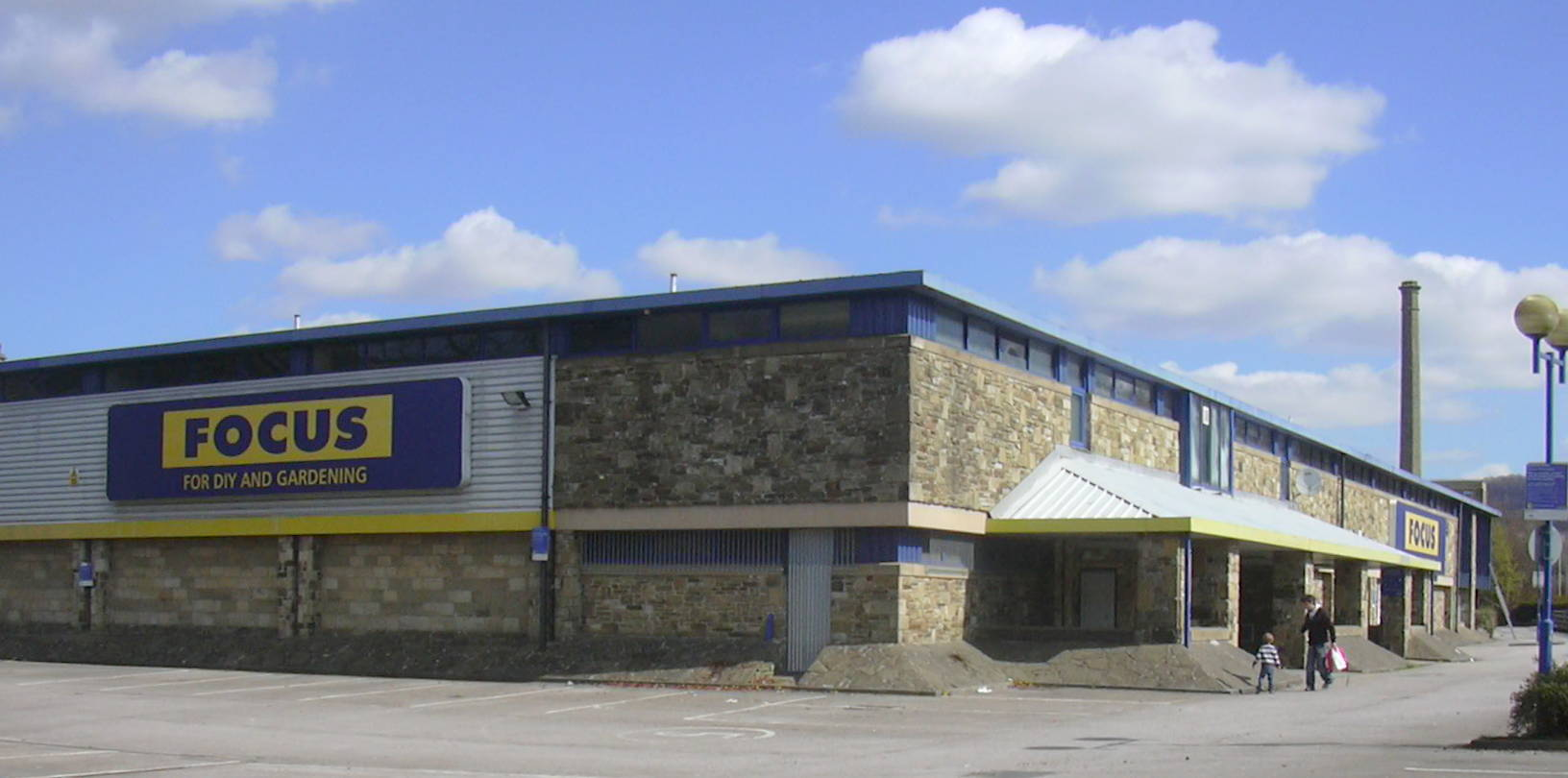
Focus DIY, Rawtenstall, Rossendale (2012)

Focus was a British do-it-yourself and home improvement retailer, founded in 1987.

The retailer grew by acquiring rival retailers such as Payless, Do It All, and Great Mills. Focus also acquired Wickes in 2000. Wickes served the trade-focused market while Focus targeted general DIY consumers. By its peak in 2002, it was the second-largest home improvement retailer in the United Kingdom with 178 stores and over 3,000 employees, behind B&Q.

The decline of Focus DIY began in the mid 2000's when Focus went on to sell the Wickes brand and its stores to Travis Perkins in 2004/2005 for £950 Million. The company began running losses every year from 2007. In the year up to 2011, the company had a loss of £25 million. Focus entered administration on 5 May 2011, with Ernst & Young appointed as administrators. The administrators sold 55 stores to B&Q, Wickes and B&M to be rebranded. The remaining 123 stores were all closed by 22 July 2011.

The defunct Focus brand is owned by AHK Designs Ltd, part of Victorian Plumbing, who also own the defunct Land of Leather and MFI brands.

== History ==
The company had its origins in the beginning of the 1980s, when Mike Williams launched Focus Homecentres for AAH Holdings plc. In December 1987, Focus Homecentres was acquired by Choice Group Ltd. The new company's shareholders included Mike Williams, Bill Archer and Greg Stanley, who had previously built up and sold the DIY chain Fads.

Focus increased its market share with a mix of both acquisitions and organic growth. This included the purchase of the Do It All DIY chain from Boots in August 1998. Until 2001, both chains were rebranded as Focus Do It All.

The company added a further 131 stores, with the purchase of Wickes in September 2000, a no frills DIY chain which focused on building supplies to the trade. This was whilst the existing Focus company had targeted the consumer end of the market. The two store formats were thought to complement each other, and so were retained as separate entities. The group became known as Focus Wickes.

The company also considered acquiring Homebase, but decided against it.

In December 2000, the group expanded again, with the purchase of the Great Mills chain, from RMC Group. Another 98 stores were added to the portfolio. The majority of these stores were re branded as Focus, except for some larger stores which became Wickes. By 2002, through rapid expansion and acquisition, Focus had become the second biggest DIY chain in Britain with 430 stores and sales of over £1.66 billion.

In December 2004, the Wickes business and stores were sold to Travis Perkins for £950 million, making a tidy return on the £350 million initial investment. The sale was completed in February 2005.

By January 2007, it was clear that the company had run into financial difficulties; it was close to breaching its banking covenants, and struggling under debts built up over the acquisition spree in the preceding years. The DIY market as a whole had experienced a two-year drop in sales. and Focus blamed "challenging" market conditions for the difficulties. Focus appointed bankers Rothschild to advise it on a potential sale of the business.

=== The "new" Focus ===
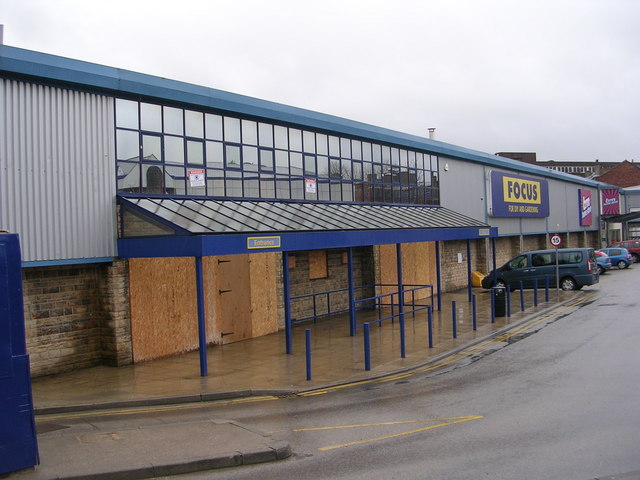
Focus DIY, Keighley, West Yorkshire (2010)

Cerberus Capital purchased Focus DIY for £1 in June 2007, and appointed Bill Grimsey, formerly CEO of Wickes, as CEO. In an attempt to tackle the financial problems the owners restructured the business, and injected fresh capital in the form of £200 million via loans by the owners Cerberus Capital, Bank of Scotland and GMAC.

Costs were slashed, and under performing stores were either closed or sold to other retailers, including Homebase, Tesco, Wickes and Sainsbury's. A programme of new store formats and further cost cutting was undertaken in 2009. In February 2011, Asda announced the purchase of six stores from Focus DIY, which were converted into supermarkets later that year.

By January 2011, the number of stores had gradually been reduced from 256 in 2007 to 178.

=== Supply chain ===
In November 2008, Focus had one main distribution centre, in Tamworth, which was acquired with Do It All in August 1998. The closure of the Severnside distribution centre was announced in October 2008, citing adverse financial circumstances.

=== Administration ===
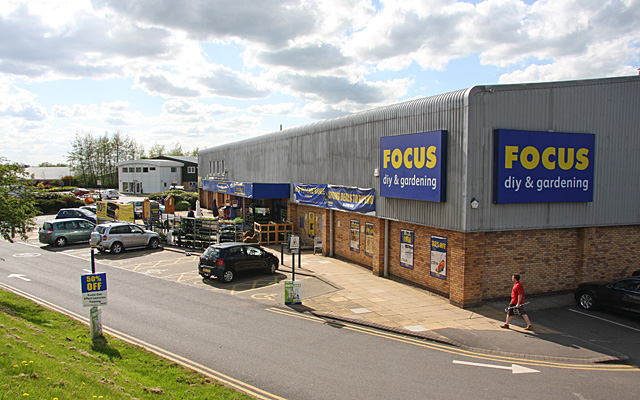
Focus DIY, Melton Mowbray, Leicestershire (2009)

In August 2009, Focus narrowly avoided administration, when BDO Insolvency practitioners achieved a company voluntary arrangement. This was to restructure, and repay debts over a contracted period of time.

On 5 May 2011, it was announced that owners Cerberus Capital had placed Focus into administration, after failed attempts to find a rescue deal. Ernst & Young placed Simon Allport, Alan Hudson and Tom Jack as joint administrators at midnight.

On 6 May 2011, it was announced that B&Q had bought 31 stores in cash for £23 million, with a plan to refit the properties and reopen them as B&Qs by July 2011, with Focus employees transferring to the stores. Ernst & Young announced the closure of the remaining stores, which were over 120, which resulted in up to 3,000 job losses.

At the time of the appointment of the administrators, the 178 strong retail chain collapsed owing businesses, shareholders and funders around £1 billion. The sale of assets generated £70 million, leaving most creditors out of pocket, including HMRC. On 22 July 2011, the final store, which was in Gillingham, ceased trading.

==== After administration ====
In December 2011, the Focus DIY brand was bought by the Walker Group. The trademarks have since become owned by Victorian Plumbing.
