= Mark Lawson =

English journalist, broadcaster and author

Mark Lawson FRSL
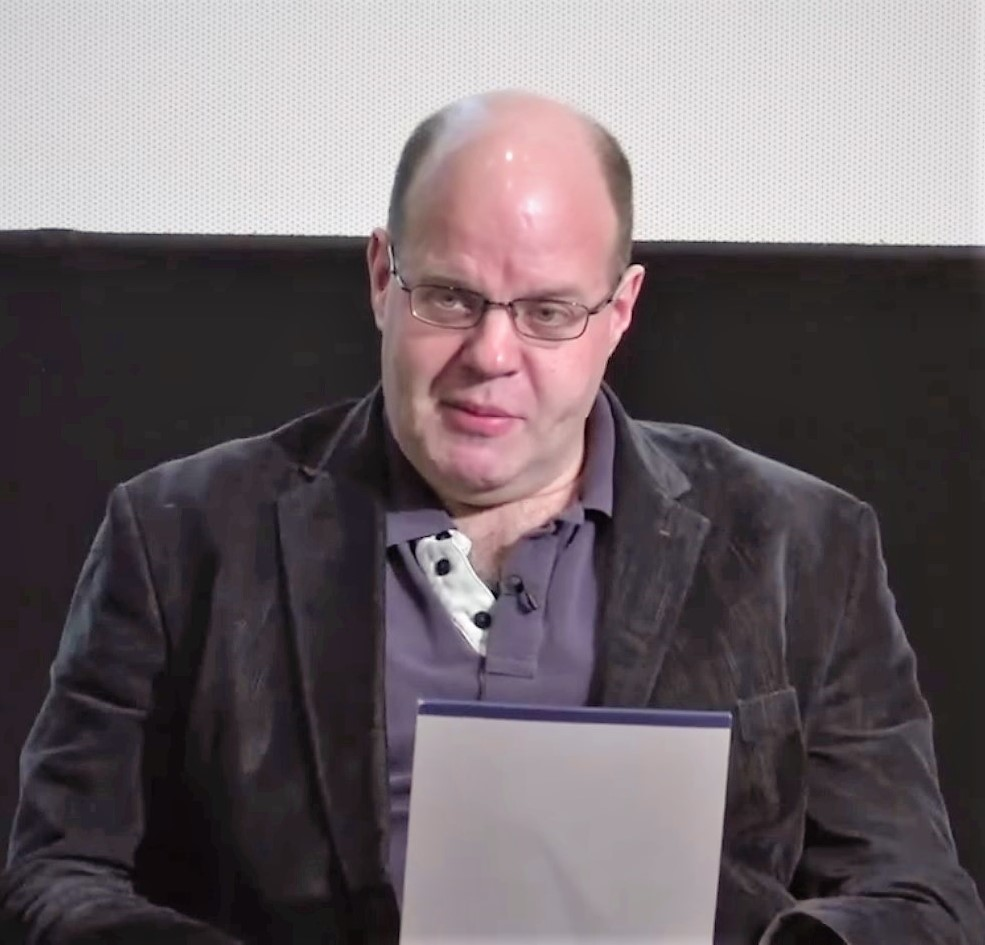
- Lawson in 2013
- Born: Mark Gerard Lawson; 11 April 1962 (age 64); Hendon, London, England
- Education: St Columba's College; University College London
- Occupations: Journalist; broadcaster; author
- Writing career
- Years active: 1984–present
- Presenting career
- Previous shows: The Late Show, BBC2; Front Row, BBC Radio 4; Mark Lawson Talks to..., BBC Four

Mark Gerard Lawson FRSL (born 11 April 1962) is an English journalist, broadcaster and author. Specialising in culture and the arts, he is best known for presenting the flagship BBC Radio 4 arts programme Front Row between 1998 and 2014. He is also a Guardian columnist, and presented Mark Lawson Talks To... on BBC Four from 2006 to 2015.

== Early life ==
Born in Hendon, North London, Lawson was raised in Leeds, where his father was a marketing director for the Civil Service and British Telecom. Both of his parents originated from the northeast of England.

Lawson was brought up a Catholic, and was educated at the independent Catholic school St Columba's College in St Albans. He then took a degree in English at University College London, where his lecturers included John Sutherland and A. S. Byatt.

== Career ==
Lawson became a freelance contributor to numerous publications in 1984, beginning on The Universe in that year, and for The Times from 1984 to 1986. He has written a column for The Guardian since 1995, having previously written for The Independent (1986–95), and has twice been named TV Critic of the Year, as well as winning many other journalism awards. However, Richard Gott, a former colleague, commented in 2002 that the "prevalence of the bland and the obsequious" on The Guardian is typified by Lawson's "embedded presence".

Lawson presented The Late Show on BBC2 in the 1990s and presented its offshoot The Late Review (later Sunday Review and from 2000 Newsnight Review) until the 2005 "review of the year" edition of Newsnight Review, broadcast on 16 December, which marked the end of his association with the format. In 2004, Lawson made a documentary for BBC Four titled The Truth About Sixties TV, criticising what he called "golden ageists" who, he said, had a rose-tinted view of television's past.

Lawson became the main presenter of BBC Radio 4's daily arts programme, Front Row, in 1998. He has written several radio plays for the network, including St Graham and St Evelyn (2003) on the friendship between the Catholic novelists Graham Greene and Evelyn Waugh and The Third Soldier Holds His Thighs (2005) on Mary Whitehouse's unsuccessful litigation against the National Theatre production of Howard Brenton's play The Romans in Britain. Lawson has also written episodes of the television version of the BBC sitcom Absolute Power, appearing as himself in the series 1 episode 2, "Pope Idol". He is one of many celebrities impersonated by the Dead Ringers team, referred to as "Britain's brainiest potato" and "the thinking woman's potato" because of his baldness. His in-depth, one-to-one interviews for BBC Four, entitled Mark Lawson Talks to …, ran from 2006 to 2015.

In addition to his work in print journalism and the broadcast media, Lawson has written five books, both fiction and non-fiction. His first, Bloody Margaret (1991), is a collection of novellas on late 20th-century politics in the UK, including an eponymous satire concerning Margaret Thatcher. This was followed by The Battle for Room Service (1993), a travelogue of people, politics and culture encountered by Lawson as a journalist. His 1995 book Idlewild is an alternative history novel in which both John F. Kennedy and Marilyn Monroe survived the 1960s. Going Out Live (2001) focused on contemporary celebrity culture and the media, and Enough is Enough (2005) is a satire set in the government of Harold Wilson during the late 1960s. Lawson chaired the judges for the 2011 Hippocrates Prize for Poetry and Medicine.

In 2006, Lawson witnessed, and reported to the BBC, a sexual assault on a BBC staff member by Jimmy Savile, later found to have been a prolific sex offender. This was recorded in the Dame Janet Smith Review report of 2016. In 2022, Lawson wrote about this encounter and his personal experience of Savile in British society.

Lawson's connection with Front Row ended in March 2014 for "personal reasons" in a joint agreement with the BBC. An internal report completed in January investigated claims of bullying within the BBC Radio Arts, which produces Front Row, and identified one producer and presenter as responsible. The Daily Telegraph reported on 5 March that Lawson was the presenter involved and he had been accused of "browbeating junior staff" who are often young freelancers. Lawson denied bullying. In his 2016 novel The Allegations, a lecturer at a fictional English university faces disciplinary action and dismissal for "B&H" (bullying and harassment). Dr Tom Pimm is accused of sighing during departmental meetings, "divisive social invitations" and "visual Insubordination (sic) towards senior management". Pimm attends a hearing during which he is told that "if someone felt you were being insensitive then, to all intents and purposes, you were". In the book's afterword, Lawson writes

It is the case that during a long, generally privileged and happy career in the media, I suffered one devastating experience of institutional group-think, baffling and contradictory management, false accusation and surreally sub-legal process; and have personal knowledge of the damage to reputation, employability and health that can result from such an ordeal.

Lawson was elected a Fellow of the Royal Society of Literature in 2015.

== Personal life ==
Lawson has been a supporter of Leeds United FC from childhood, but also follows Northampton Town FC and frequently goes to games, both at Sixfields Stadium and away. He lives near Towcester in Northamptonshire.

== Bibliography ==
- Bloody Margaret: Three Political Fantasies (Picador, 1991) ISBN 0-330-32386-5
- The Battle for Room Service: Journeys to All the Safe Places (Picador, 1993) ISBN 0-330-32384-9
- Idlewild (Picador, 1995) ISBN 0-330-34111-1
- Going Out Live (Picador, 2001) ISBN 0-330-48860-0
- Enough Is Enough: or, The Emergency Government (Picador, 2005) ISBN 0-330-43803-4
- The Deaths (Picador, 2013)
- The Allegations. London: Picador. 2016. ISBN 978-1-5098-2088-7. OCLC 953332571.
