= Bageye at the Wheel =

2012 memoir by Colin Grant

- First edition (publ. Jonathan Cape)
- Author: Colin Grant
- Language: English
- Publisher: Jonathan Cape
- Publication date: 2012

Bageye at the Wheel is a 2012 memoir by British author Colin Grant, giving a semi-autobiographical account of 1970s' Luton through the portrayal of his father Clinton "Bageye" Grant, a Jamaican migrant to the UK. The story itself is one of observation of a period whereby a provincial town of immigrants (a mixture of Irish, Asian and Caribbean) and their larger families congregate, yet try to assimilate into a British culture that had not yet been accustomed to diversity among ethnicities. Nevertheless, this indifference to a somewhat unforgiving environment is neatly summed up by the unwavering, independent "Bageye", who refuses to blend in but rather stand out as a linchpin for the so-called "Windrush generation".

According to the review in The Guardian: "In its toughness and tenderness, as well as its sensuous and telling details, Bageye at the Wheel is a father memoir that deserves to be as celebrated as Ian Jack's essay 'Finished With Engines' or Gary Imlach's My Father and Other Working-Class Football Heroes. It's a quietly unforgettable book about innocence and experience, about memory and cruelty – and the cruelty of memory." For Peter Carty in The Independent, "a lot of the book's appeal comes from Grant's insider perspective on the Afro-Caribbean experience in the UK." Keith Bruce notes in The Herald: "These pages are populated by a bunch of immigrant men who have bestowed Truman Capote-style nicknames on each other. There's the popular Summer Wear (really one Ian Dixon) with his unseasonal clothing, the fastidious Tidy Boots and the tardy Soon Come. The opening chapters are stand-alone short stories about the domestic adventures of Bageye and these "spars" and are almost reminiscent of Tom Sawyer."

Colin Grant is a historian and BBC producer. He is also the author of Negro with a Hat, a biography of Marcus Garvey, and I&I: The Natural Mystics, a group biography of The Wailers, Bob Marley, Peter Tosh and Bunny Livingston.
