= Colin Grant (author) =

Jamaican writer (born 1961)

Colin Grant FRSL
- Born: 1961 (age 64–65); Hitchin, England, United Kingdom
- Occupations: Writer, historian
- Notable work: Bageye at the Wheel
- Spouse: Jo Alderson
- Children: Jasmine, Maya, and Toby
- Website: colingrant.info

Colin Grant (born 1961) is a British writer of Jamaican origin, who is the author of several books, including a 2008 biography of Marcus Garvey entitled Negro with a Hat: The Rise and Fall of Marcus Garvey and His Dream of Mother Africa and a 2012 memoir, Bageye at the Wheel. Grant is also a historian, Associate Fellow in the Centre for Caribbean Studies and was a BBC radio producer.

== Biography ==
=== Early years ===
Colin Grant was born in England to Jamaican immigrant parents. He grew up on a council estate in Luton, had a brother Christopher (who died from epilepsy) and attended St Columba's College, St Albans.

=== Career ===
Grant joined the BBC in 1991 and has worked as a TV script editor and radio producer of arts and science programmes on Radio 4 and on the World Service. In 2009, a two-part documentary about Caribbean Voices (1943–1958) was produced by Grant.

He has written and directed plays, including The Clinic, based on the lives of the photojournalists Tim Page and Don McCullin. Among several radio drama-documentaries he has written and produced are African Man of Letters: The Life of Ignatius Sancho, A Fountain of Tears: The Murder of Federico Garcia Lorca, and Move Over Charlie Brown: The Rise of Boondocks.

Grant's first book was the biography Negro with a Hat: The Rise and Fall of Marcus Garvey and His Dream of Mother Africa (2008), described in The Jamaica Gleaner as "magisterial, meticulously researched", in The Independent on Sunday as "drawing on gargantuan research", and in The Guardian as "eminently readable". In 2011, I & I: The Natural Mystics: Marley, Tosh, and Wailer was published, a group biography, about which Lemn Sissay said: "Colin Grant has cleverly personified the birth of a nation, the birth of a religion and the birth of reggae through the lives of Bob Marley, Peter Tosh and Bunny Wailer." This was followed in 2012 by Bageye at the Wheel, a memoir about growing up Jamaican in Luton that was shortlisted for the PEN/Ackerley Prize.

In 2016, Grant published the memoir A Smell of Burning, about which Maggie Gee wrote in The Observer: "Colin Grant's brilliant, tender book is really two books: a history of our incomplete understanding of the puzzling brain phenomenon that is epilepsy, and the story of his beloved brother Christopher." It was chosen by The Sunday Times as a Book of the Year 2016.

In his 2019 book, Homecoming: Voices of the Windrush Generation, which was a BBC Radio 4 Book of the Week, "Grant collates fragments from several hundred interviews, first-hand and archival, with a cross-section of Caribbean immigrants to Britain from the 1940s and early 60s, and allows his subjects to speak for themselves in idiosyncratic statements that refuse to be co-opted into a generalized account of immigrant experience."

He was elected a Fellow of the Royal Society of Literature in 2020.

In 2023, his memoir I'm Black So You Don't Have To Be was published, its title described by The Guardian as "a jab at the privileges of the children of the Windrush generation who, hell-bent on being accepted by British society, have left the labour of Blackness to their parents."

Having left the BBC in 2018, Grant is now director of WritersMosaic, a division of the Royal Literary Fund.

== Personal life ==
Grant lives in Brighton, where he moved to escape police harassment ("I got fed up with being stopped and searched in London by the police," he has said). He lives there with Jo Alderson and their three children, Jasmine, Maya, and Toby.

== Bibliography ==
- Negro with a Hat: The Rise and Fall of Marcus Garvey and His Dream of Mother Africa, London: Jonathan Cape, 2008; Oxford University Press, United States, 2008
- I & I: The Natural Mystics: Marley, Tosh, and Wailer, London: Jonathan Cape, 2011; New York: W. W. Norton & Company, 2011
- Bageye at the Wheel, London: Jonathan Cape, 2012
- A Smell of Burning: The Story of Epilepsy, London: Jonathan Cape, 2016
- Homecoming: Voices of the Windrush Generation, London: Jonathan Cape, 2019
- I'm Black So You Don’t Have to Be, London: Jonathan Cape, 2023
