= Texas Homecare =

Former chain of DIY stores in the UK and Ireland

- Founded: 1972
- Founders: Manny Fogel; Sydney Fogel; Gerald Fogel
- Defunct: 1999
- Fate: Acquired
- Successor: Homebase
- Owner: CDS Superstores (trademarks)
- Parent: Ladbrokes (1986–1995); Sainsbury's (1995–1999)

Texas Homecare (also marketed simply as Texas) was a British home improvement retailer that traded across the United Kingdom and Ireland. The firm operated from 1972 until 1999.

== History ==
Texas Homecare was first established in 1972 by Manny, Sydney and Gerald Fogel, who had previously founded the high street specialist paint and wallpaper chain Home Charm. Using an American business model as inspiration, they revolutionised the UK's DIY market. Texas specialised in higher-volume, lower-margin DIY products. However, in the 1980s the company was adversely affected by the recession and depressed housing market, and was acquired first by Ladbrokes and later by J Sainsbury plc, before merging with and being replaced by Homebase.

=== Acquisition ===
Having acquired Texas Homecare in 1986, Ladbrokes sold the business to J Sainsbury in 1995. At the time of the purchase, Texas had more than 11,600 staff, while Homebase had c. 4,500. As part of the acquisition, 26 Texas stores closed and Sainsbury's converted the remaining stores to the Homebase brand. The conversion to Homebase was completed in 1999, when the Texas Homecare brand was discontinued.

In 2000, the former chief executive of Texas Homecare, Ron Trenter, made an unsuccessful bid for Homebase.

In November 2024, Homebase went into administration. In April 2025, the Texas Homecare intellectual property was transferred from the administrators of Homebase to CDS Superstores (trading as The Range), as it was included within their purchase of Homebase assets.

== See also ==
- Homebase
