= Home improvement center =

Retail store

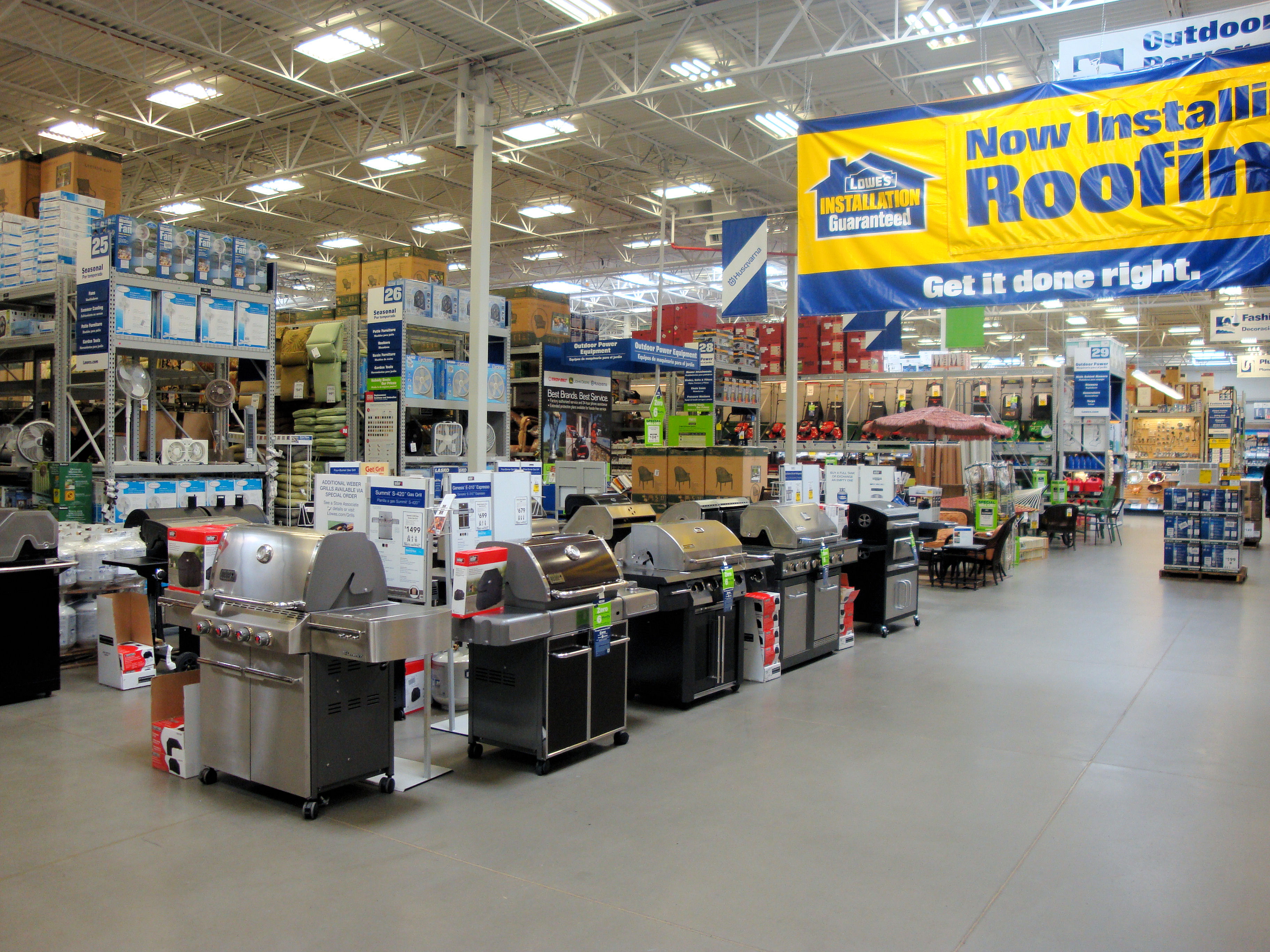
Interior of a home improvement center

A home improvement center, home improvement store, or home center is a retail store that combines the functions of a hardware store with those of a lumber yard. Home improvement stores typically sell building supplies, tools, and lumber.

== By market ==
Australia

Prominent outdoor retailers in Australia include Bunnings, Home Hardware, Mitre 10, Thrifty-Link Hardware, Total Tools and True Value Hardware.

Canada

A prominent outdoor retailer in Canada is Rona.

United Kingdom

As of January 2025, B&Q is the most prominent UK home improvement retailer with over 300 stores. This is followed by Wickes with over 200 stores.

United States

Prominent outdoor retailers in the United States include Home Depot, Lowe's, and Menards.

== See also ==
- Better Homes in America
