= Bill Grimsey =

English businessman (born 1952)

- Born: 21 January 1952 (age 74); Kensington, London, England
- Occupation: Businessman

William Grimsey (born 21 January 1952 in Kensington, London) is an English businessman who has specialised in the food and DIY sectors, most notably at Wickes, Iceland, and Focus (DIY).

== Early career ==
Grimsey left school at 15 to become a butcher's boy. Under pressure from his father he then trained as a civil engineer for two years before returning to college to take his A-levels, and joining Bishop's Food Stores as a trainee manager, rising to become a director. The chain was eventually bought by Booker. When Bishop's merged with Budgens in 1986, Grimsey joined Tesco to work for Lord MacLaurin.

In 1988, Grimsey left to run Hutchison Whampoa's Park n' Shop supermarket chain in Hong Kong, where he remained five years, increasing profits twentyfold. He then returned to the United Kingdom for a short spell at Kingfisher plc.

== Wickes ==
He then ran Wickes' joint venture in South Africa, returning to England again in July 1996 to take up the position of managing director of WBS, the Wickes' retailing subsidiary which was at the centre of serious accounting irregularities. In November Grimsey moved to Wickes to oversee its recovery from the accounting irregularity scandal that saw its share price suspended and the banks foreclosing. Grimsey launched a rights issue, started an employee share scheme, and turned around the company to the point where it was bought by Focus-Do-It-All, backed by Duke Street Capital for a reported £289m in September 2000. He believed this represented fair value for shareholders at the time, yet four years later the business was sold again for £950m to Travis Perkins.

== Iceland ==
In January 2001 he took up the position of CEO of Iceland, replacing Stuart Rose who had been CEO since Iceland's merger with Booker plc in the summer of 2000. Malcolm Walker, Iceland's founder & Chairman, was forced to stand down soon after as it was revealed he had sold £13.5 million of Iceland shares five weeks before the company released the first of several profits warnings.

Iceland was renamed the Big Food Group in February 2002, and attempted a refocus on the convenience sector with a bid for Londis. Grimsey remained until the takeover and demerger of the Big Food Group by a consortium led by the Icelandic company, Baugur Group in February 2005. Walker returned to his previous role at Iceland. Under Walker's control Iceland's website is a polemic against Grimsey's period in charge, a campaign Walker continued to drive home up to 2013.

== FTI Palladium Partners ==
Grimsey had a brief spell as a Senior managing director (interim manager) at FTI Palladium Partners, London from March 2006.

== Focus DIY ==
He was appointed CEO of Focus (DIY) on its acquisition by Cerberus Capital for £230M in June 2007, stating at the time that "Focus has the potential to be one of the most successful operators in the DIY sector". Two years later, in August 2009, Grimsey successfully sought a CVA agreement with creditors to save the business from administration. In May 2011, with Grimsey now as chairman, the company was declared insolvent and appointed Ernst & Young as administrators.

== Non-executive roles ==
He served as a non-executive director of Capita Group plc from October 2006 until standing down in July 2010.

In March 2012 he was appointed a non-executive director of Findel plc.

== High Street ==
Grimsey published a book in 2012 regarding the High Street debate: Sold Out which was written for him by professional ghostwriter Teena Lyons.

In 2013 he published a report on the state of the high street retail sector, The Grimsey Review, which led the Labour party to appoint him as an advisor but six months later he had still not met the party's leader Ed Miliband. This was updated in July 2018 with a second edition of the review. The review highlighted the problem of the UK having too much retail space and suggested that the centres of cities and towns should focus on becoming community spaces.
