= Do It All =

British do it yourself and home improvement retailing company

- Type: Public company
- Industry: Retail; DIY
- Founded: 1963; 63 years ago
- Defunct: 2001; 25 years ago
- Fate: Acquired by Focus DIY and absorbed into parent company in 2001.
- Successor: Focus DIY
- Products: DIY Tools; Paint and decor Outdoor living Kitchens; Bathrooms; Gardening
- Parent: WHSmith (100%: 1978–1988, 50%: 1988–1996); Boots Group (50%: 1988–1996, 100%: 1996–1998); Focus DIY (1998–2001)

Do It All was a British do it yourself and home improvement retailing company that underwent a number of changes of ownership. In 1998, the business was sold to Focus DIY, which itself entered administration in 2011, with all its stores closing later that year.

== History ==
The business can trace its roots to two do it yourself chains, Big K and Calypso. These were bought by LCP (Lunt Comley & Pitt) and traded as LCP Homecentres. In 1978, the business was acquired by WHSmith and renamed W.H. Smith Do It All Limited, trading as WHSmith Do It All.

Do It All sold a range of over 25,000 DIY products, including paint, wallpaper, tools and power tools, as well as construction materials such as plywood and chipboard. All stores had an inhouse timber cutting service, and all but the smallest had in-store concessions for businesses such as Harris Carpets.

During the 1980s, fierce competition saw the chain struggle. In 1988, it merged with the rival chain Payless DIY, which was owned by the Boots Group. As a result, WHSmith and Boots each owned 50% of the combined group, and the Payless stores were rebranded under the Do It All brand. However, following continued losses, WHSmith sold their share in the company to Boots in 1996 for the token amount of £1.

=== Fate ===
Boots, wanting to concentrate on its core pharmacy businesses, sold the 139 Do It All stores to Focus DIY in 1998 for £68 million. The stores were initially rebranded under the name Focus Do It All, and later, in 2001, to simply Focus, following the company’s purchase of Great Mills the previous year.

Focus DIY had also acquired Wickes in 2000, and some former Do It All stores were converted to Wickes, mostly in areas felt to be outside the core market. Soon after, the Do It All name disappeared completely.
