= Land of Leather =

Former furniture retailer

Land of Leather Holdings plc
- Type: Public
- Industry: Furniture retail
- Founded: 1994; 32 years ago
- Founder: Jerry Briant
- Defunct: 2009; 17 years ago
- Fate: Dissolved
- Headquarters: Kent, United Kingdom
- Number of locations: 2 (September 2009); 109 (December 2008)
- Area served: United Kingdom; Ireland
- Products: Furniture
- Number of employees: 850 (December 2008)

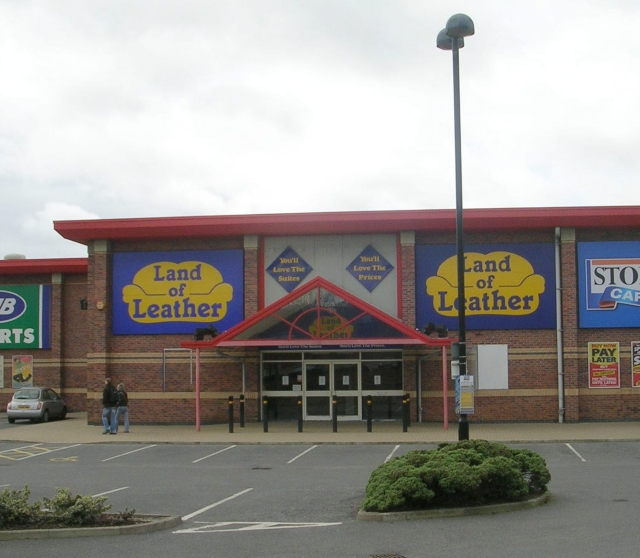
Land of Leather store in the Westgate Retail Park in Wakefield, England

Land of Leather was a furniture retail store based in Northfleet, Kent in the United Kingdom. It operated in the United Kingdom and Ireland.

The company was hit hard by the downward slope in the United Kingdom's housing market which was brought about by the decline in demand, due to a lesser number of people buying and moving homes.

== History ==
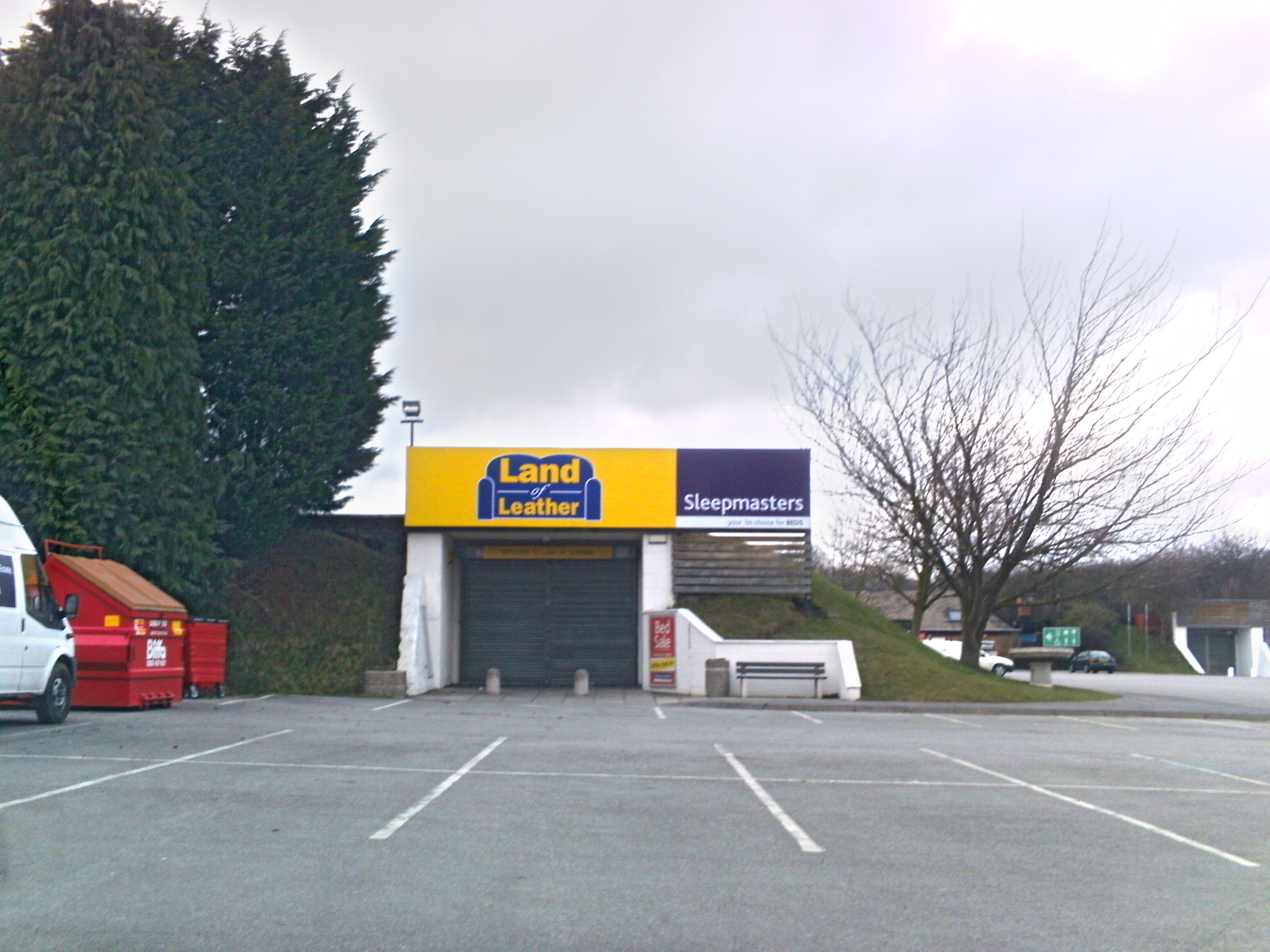
Land of Leather on the Thorp Arch Trading Estate, Wetherby, West Yorkshire

Land of Leather was founded in 1994 by Jerry Briant, and in July 2005, the company was floated on the London Stock Exchange, with the assistance of the investment bank, Investec, using the symbol LAN. In December 2008, the company employed 850 people in its 109 stores in the United Kingdom and Ireland. In January 2009, Land of Leather issued profit warnings, and was planning to raise £15 million through a new share issue.

In December 2008, Land of Leather's announcement that they were in buyout talks with a number of interested parties, caused their share price to rise by 38.5%. However, these talks ended later in December citing "insufficient value for shareholders".

=== Administration ===
On 12 January 2009, Land of Leather Holdings plc announced that they had entered administration. Lee Manning and Nick Edwards of Deloitte were appointed as joint administrators. The company was debt free, but it was unable to secure additional funds.

The company cited reduced consumer spending and the state of the banking market at the time as the causes. The administrators are aiming to sell the company as a going concern. On 26 January 2009, it was announced that 33 stores would close, leaving 76 stores.

Soon after, the remaining Land of Leather stores closed down, and the company ceased trading in the beginning of 2009.

== "Toxic sofa" lawsuit ==
Land of Leather sold Linkwise sofas made in China, which contained sachets of the mould-inhibiting chemical DMF. This caused serious rashes to more than 300 users, due to an allergic reaction. Land of Leather had an insurance policy with Zurich Financial Services, but the insurer refused to pay out, claiming that Land of Leather had breached policy terms.

This position was accepted on 18 March 2010, by the High Court of England and Wales, and purchasers will not be indemnified by the insurer.
