= B&Q =

British home improvement retail chain

B&Q Limited
- Formerly: B & Q (Retail) Limited (1970–1987); B & Q plc (1987–2019); B&Q plc (6 Nov 2019)
- Type: Subsidiary
- Industry: Retail
- Founded: 5 March 1969; 57 years ago
- Founder: Richard Block; David Quayle
- Headquarters: Chandler's Ford, Borough of Eastleigh, England, UK
- Number of locations: 318 shops (2026)
- Area served: United Kingdom; Guernsey; Jersey; Isle of Man; Ireland; Saudi Arabia
- Key people: Graham Bell (CEO)
- Products: DIY Home improvement tools; Gardening Supplies and Plants
- Revenue: £3.8 billion (2022/23)
- Net income: £603 million (2022/23)
- Number of employees: 27,000 (2023)
- Parent: Kingfisher plc
- Website: diy.com

B&Q Limited (short for Block & Quayle after the company's two founders) is a British multinational DIY, home improvement and garden centre retailing company, with headquarters in Chandler's Ford, England. It is a wholly owned subsidiary of Kingfisher plc. It was founded on 5 March 1969 by Richard Block and David Quayle.

It is the UK's largest home improvement retailer, serving both the general public and tradespeople. In contrast, its main competitor Wickes primarily caters to trade professionals. Where the British home improvement sector faced hostile competition in the 1990s, B&Q has become the dominant retailer in its sector following the demise of Focus in 2011 and Homebase in 2025.

== History ==
=== 1969 to 1979: Early growth ===
B&Q was founded on 5 March 1969 in Southampton, England, by Richard Block (1942–2023) and David Quayle (1936–2010), following the purchase and fitting out of a former furniture warehouse in the Southampton suburb of Portswood. Originally called Block & Quayle, the duo soon shortened the brand to B&Q as stock delivery notes and invoices were already unofficially abbreviating the name.

By each working over sixty-hour, six-day weeks, they were able to repay their bank overdraft within six months of opening, with turnover reaching £1 million within the first five years of operating. The chain quickly expanded, and by 1979, there were 26 shops across the United Kingdom.

Co-founder Block left the company in 1976.

=== 1980s: Buyout and further expansion ===
B&Q grew rapidly through a combination of mergers, acquisitions and expansions, such as the acquisition of a Hampshire based company Dodge City at the beginning of the 1980s. The chain was acquired by the F. W. Woolworth Company for £16.8 million at the beginning of the 1980s, coinciding with Quayle, who by that time had a personal wealth of £4 million, selling his share. Quayle left the company in 1982.

Two years later, F. W. Woolworth's United Kingdom subsidiary (Woolworths Group) and B&Q were purchased by Paternoster Stores, which became Kingfisher plc and is still B&Q's parent company as of 2023.

B&Q developed two new trading formats: HomeCentres, retailing furniture, bathrooms, soft furniture, flooring and lighting; and AutoCentres, being similar to a Halfords, the first launch taking place at Cribbs Causeway, Bristol, at the end of the 1980s. The concept being to have a HomeCentre, AutoCentre and DIY Superstore with one communal car park.

The forays into these new markets were relatively short lived, and the various sites were sold on a couple of years later. The AutoCentres becoming in the main 'Charlie Browns', the HomeCentres being sold off individually.

=== 1990s ===
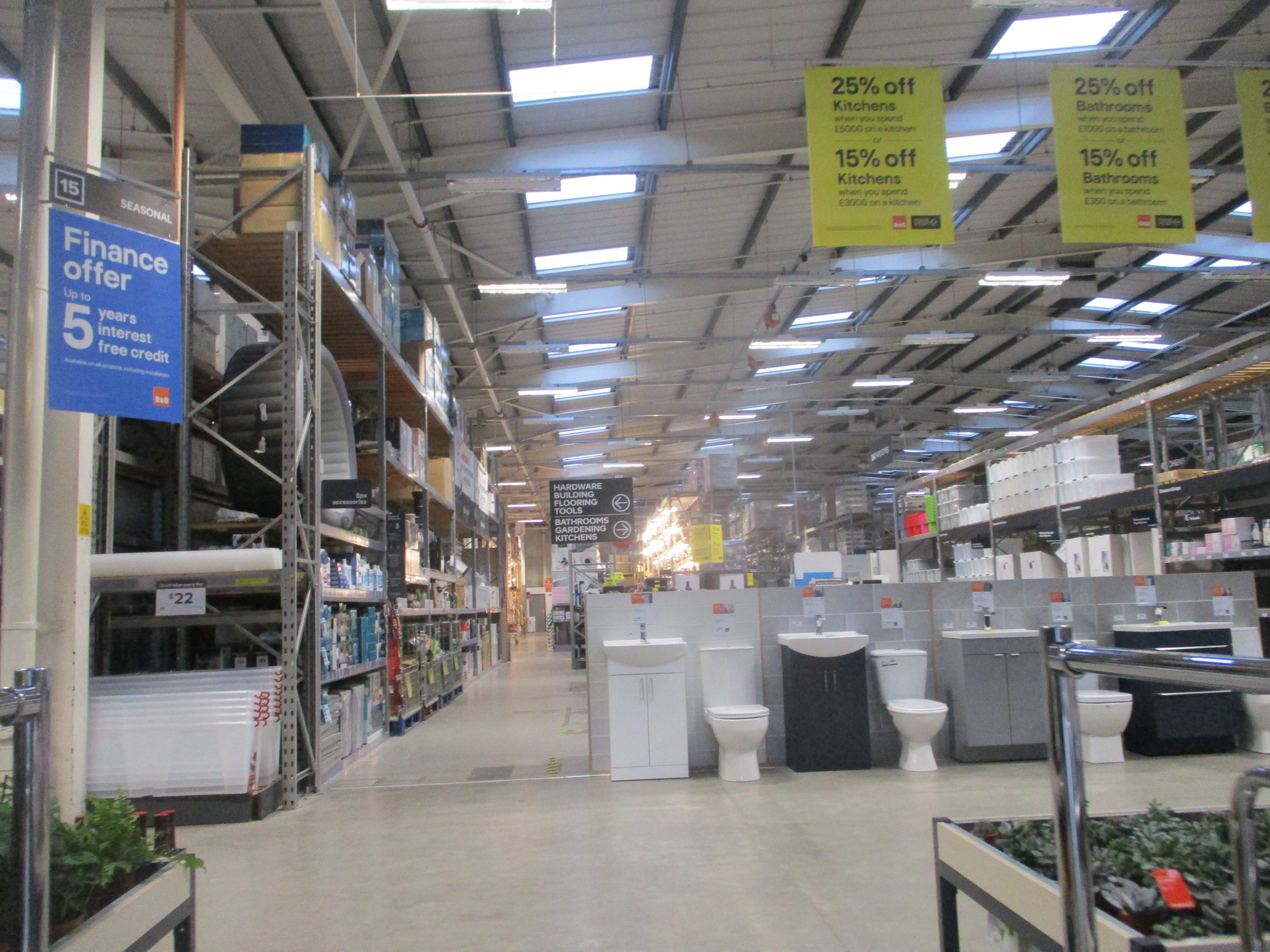
Interior of B&Q, Castleford

In the mid 1990s, B&Q opened a new format of shop known as the Depot (later changed to B&Q Depot), a forerunner of a new class of shop known as the B&Q Warehouse. This new store format was almost identical to that of the US chain Home Depot, where the stores were built on a much bigger scale with a larger floor area, merchandise presented on two storey, industrial-style shelving and an enhanced range of product lines which now extended to bulk building materials. For the branding of these new stores B&Q also moved to a new corporate colour style of orange (away from the previous black/red) which again was almost the same as Home Depot. For this reason, it is often erroneously believed that there is a formal connection between the two companies. The company also began to expand outside the United Kingdom. In 1995, the retailer opened their first overseas subsidiary in Taiwan, and in January 1996, the first overseas large home improvement centre in Taoyuan City, Taiwan.

In September 1998, it acquired NOMI, Poland's leading chain of DIY shops, and later that year, merged with France's Castorama.

=== 2000s ===
In December 2000, Kingfisher plc acquired 28 development sites, intended to house future shops of rival chain Homebase from Sainsbury's, who sold the chain. The development sites instead housed shops of B&Q. In August 2001, B&Q opened its first shop in Shanghai, when it hoped to increase outlets from four to 58 by 2005.

B&Q opened its first shop in Hong Kong on 1 June 2007, but was scheduled to close it on 13 September 2009. In December 2007, Kingfisher sold its 50 per cent stake in B&Q Taiwan to its joint venture partner. The $106.5 million (£51.6 million) sale, producing a profit of £25 million, was used to reduce debt.

In March 2009, B&Q closed 22 of its then 63 shops in China, blaming the housing slump.

=== 2010s ===
In May 2011, B&Q agreed to acquire 31 shops in the United Kingdom, from the administrators of Focus DIY for £23 million. During 2011, B&Q opened a new regional distribution centre, at G.Park in Swindon.

=== 2020s ===
In 2020, B&Q announced a sales increase of 17.6pc to £3.5 billion for the quarter to 31 October, caused by the COVID-19 pandemic during which people spent money on home improvements.

In 2021, B&Q announced the launch of its new website in the Republic of Ireland.

In 2022, B&Q opened its first two shops in Saudi Arabia, in the capital, Riyadh.

In May 2023, B&Q opened new distribution centre in Bassetlaw. Later, in August, B&Q opened in Sutton, the UK.

In January 2024, B&Q unveiled its plan to open its tenth local store on Staines high street. Later in February, B&Q announced its increase of its hourly rate of pay for its UK employees to £12.21 and up to £13.55 in London. Also in 2024, B&Q reported the opening of its new store in Staines.

In January 2025, B&Q announced they would acquire five Homebase locations from the administrators; they had previously announced they would rescue three Homebase stores in the Republic of Ireland.

== Brands ==
Diall (standing for 'Do It All') is a B&Q brand.

GoodHome is the main own-brand at B&Q stores, ranging from the complete kitchen collection, to paint, decorating sundries and more.

245 of approximately 318 B&Q stores have the TradePoint sub-brand operating its own dedicated space within them. In 2026, the brand opened its first dedicated space in East London.

== Customers ==
B&Q were reported to have a customer base of seven million in July 2016, of which it was estimated 75% use the retailer's website to research their desired products, prior to purchasing in shop.

B&Q operated a Diamond Club scheme which offered some benefits, but it was closed to new members in 2018. It still can be used by established members, but only on exterior & ‘seasonal’ products.

== Corporate affairs ==
The head office is in the B&Q House in Chandler's Ford. The 220,000-square-foot (20,000 m^{2}), three storey facility was made to be B&Q's head office, and its construction time was slightly more than two years. The company moved into the facility in 2011, with an official September opening, after previously occupying the Portswood House in Hampshire Corporate Park, also in Chandler's Ford.

The retail chain offers over 40,000 products across their 300 shops and through their online presence. Reports in May 2007 suggested it was the second largest in Europe, and the fourth largest in the world (behind the Home Depot, Lowe's and OBI).

=== Shops ===
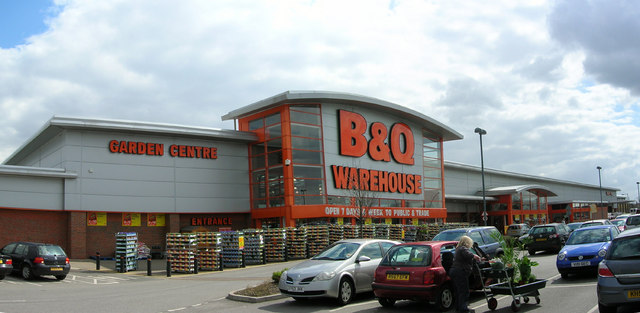
A B&Q store in Grimsby, England

By 2000, B&Q had 51 large warehouse shops; this had doubled by 2003. By May 2014, B&Q in the United Kingdom had 359 shops, and 20,887 employees; and eight shops in Ireland.

In March 2015, Kingfisher said it would close 60 B&Q shops in the United Kingdom and Ireland over the next two years, and a few loss-making shops elsewhere in Europe. It also said that B&Q UK and Ireland could adequately meet local customer needs, from fewer shops, and some shops should be smaller.

=== Financial performance ===
B&Q account for around a third of their parent company's revenues, seeing like for like sales increase by 5.6% in August 2016. In the year ending 31 January 2007, sales were £3.9 billion despite overall sales falling by 1.7% compared to the previous year, whilst profit was £162.9 million, a fall from £208.5 million during the previous year. Profit fell further in the year ending 31 January 2008, to £131 million.

In March 2013, it was reported that the retail chain's Ireland operation was making losses, with their then nine shops making a combined loss of £7 million throughout 2012, yet its operations within the United Kingdom turned a profit despite an overall decrease in sales by 5.6%.

== International operations ==
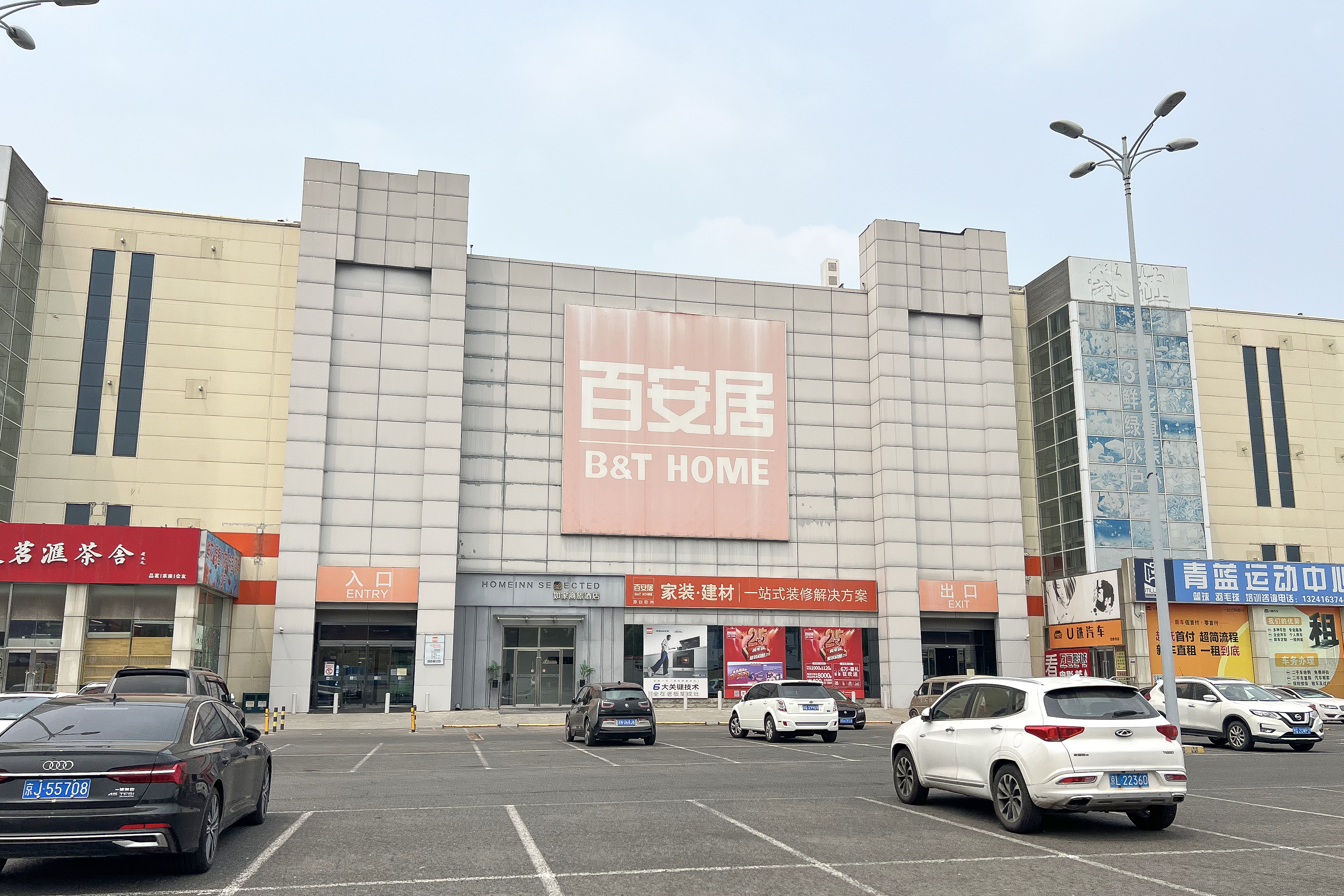
B&Q Beijing Sijiqing outlet opened in 2003, rebranded in English as "B&T Home" (whilst the Chinese name was kept the same) in March 2018 (taken in July 2024)

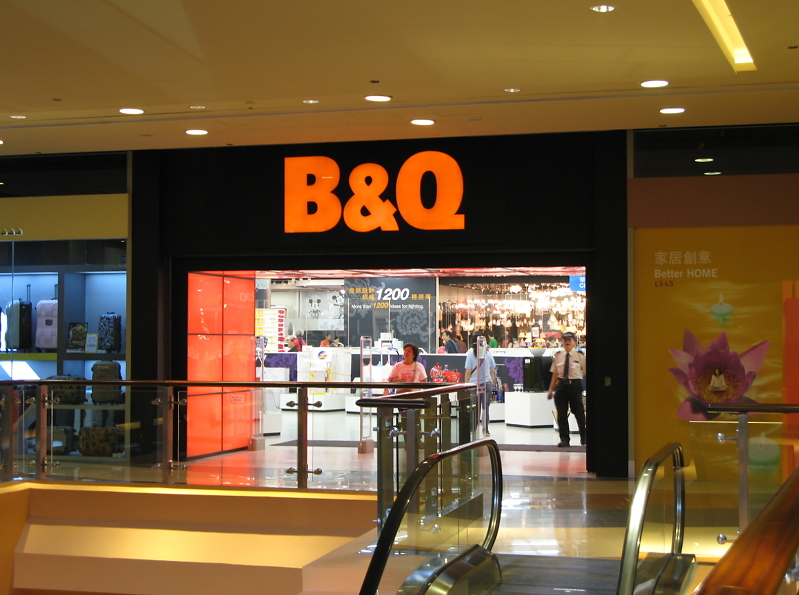
A former B&Q MegaBox outlet in Hong Kong (2007)

Outside the United Kingdom, B&Q's other international operations are in Ireland and, since 2022, in Saudi Arabia. On 31 January 2013, B&Q Ireland Ltd filed for examinership in the Irish courts and PWC Ireland was appointed examiner, though shops continued to trade while alternative financing arrangements were made.

B&Q Ireland had been making a loss since two years before, although the shops in the United Kingdom continued to stay in profit. The chain exited examinership a few months later in May 2013, following High Court approval for investment totalling €2.4 million to allow eight of their nine shops to continue operating.

B&Q expanded into China during 1999, building up a chain of nearly 40 shops, but opted to sell a 70% controlling stake of operations in China to Wumart in 2015, due to poor sales. B&Q's parent company had previously sold its 50% stake in B&Q Taiwan in 2007 in order to focus on what was then a rapidly growing business in China.

The company's subsidiary B&Q Asia began operations in Hong Kong in 2007. The company planned to open locations in 2008 that were smaller than the initial locations.

== Incidents ==
In June 2001, in Poole, Dorset, 69-year-old customer Pamela Jean Hinchliffe was fatally crushed by a forklift at the firm's Fleetsbridge shop. In June 2004, B&Q were found guilty of causing her death, and the following month they were fined £550,000.

In July 2017, B&Q faced widespread criticism from customers complaining of bad smells and headaches after painting their homes with Valspar paint sold to them. This led to B&Q compensating hundreds of customers, with the problem said to be caused by bacterial contamination in the can causing emission of hydrogen sulphide and ammonia.

On 3 September 2026, the UK Government revealed that B&Q was at the top of a list of companies that had paid workers below the minimum wage, failing to pay £456,934.72 to 4,530 workers.
