= Wickes =

British home improvement store chain

Wickes Group plc

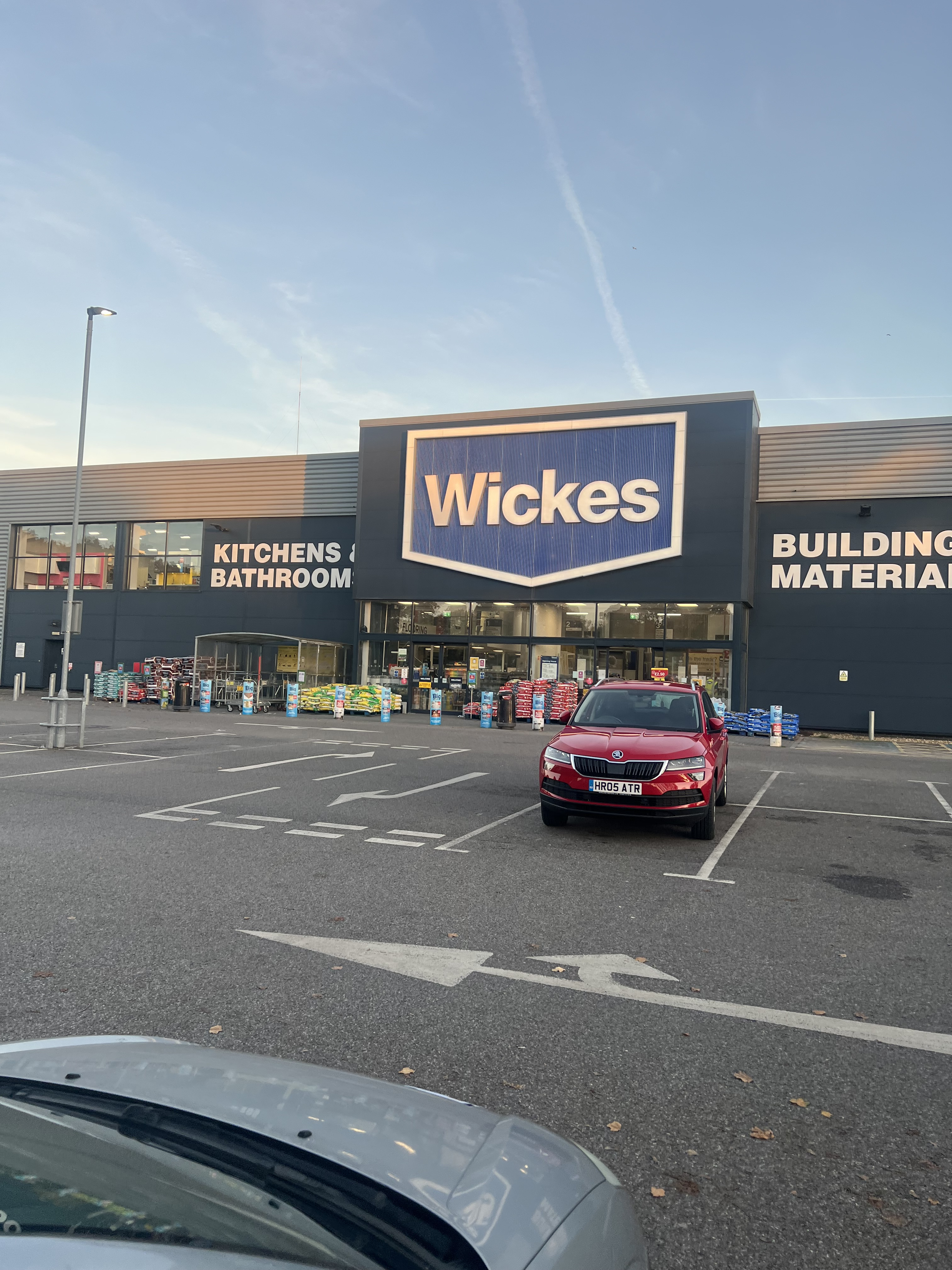
- Store in Farnborough in 2024
- Trade name: Wickes
- Type: Public
- Traded as: LSE: WIX
- Industry: Retail
- Founded: 1972; 54 years ago
- Headquarters: Watford, England, United Kingdom
- Number of locations: 228 (2020)
- Area served: United Kingdom
- Key people: Christopher Rogers (Chairman); David Wood (CEO)
- Products: Do It Yourself; Do It For Me; Home Improvement; Garden Supplies; Kitchens & Bathrooms
- Revenue: ▲£1,636.2 million (2025)
- Operating income: ▲£70.6 million (2025)
- Net income: ▲£37.8 million (2025)
- Website: www.wickes.co.uk

Wickes Group plc is a British home improvement retailer. It is the second-largest home improvement retailer in the United Kingdom, behind B&Q. Whilst it is open to the general public, its sales of supplies and materials are predominantly orientated towards tradespeople. It is a specialist in kitchen and bathroom installations, with display showrooms at its locations. It was spun off from Travis Perkins in April 2021.

It is listed on the London Stock Exchange and is a constituent of the FTSE 250 Index.

== History ==
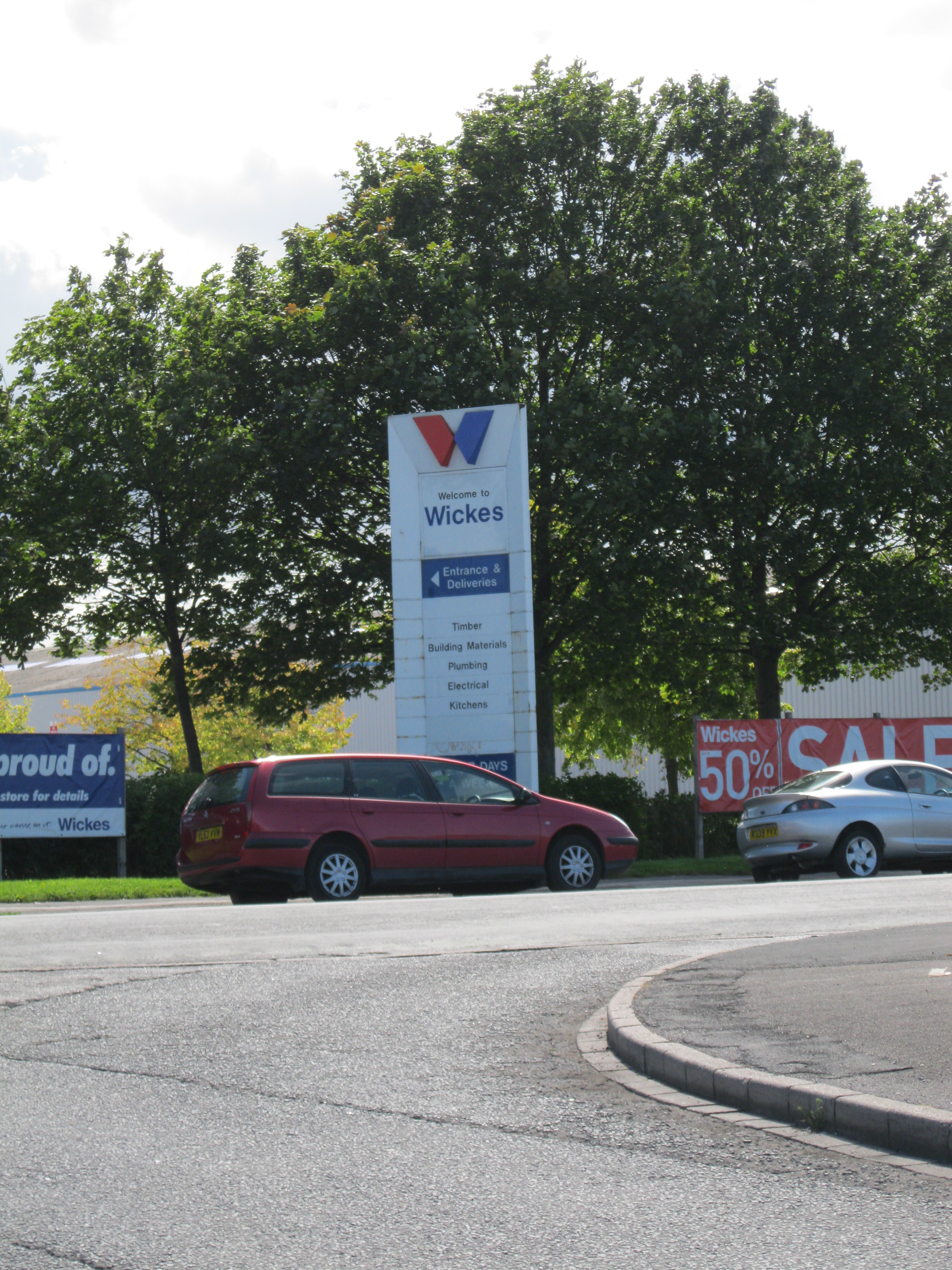
Wickes store sign (2011)

In 1972, the United States–based Wickes Companies, whose operations included a chain of lumberyards, teamed with British builders' merchants' Sankey's to open the first Wickes store in the United Kingdom. By 1987 Wickes was trading from 41 locations, and was floated on the London Stock Exchange under the leadership of CEO Henry Sweetbaum. Serious accounting irregularities, involving the overstatement of profits, were uncovered in June 1996.

In November 1996 Bill Grimsey was appointed CEO, to oversee its recovery from the accounting scandal that saw its share price suspended and the banks foreclosing. In January 1997, Grimsey launched a rights issue, started an employee share scheme, and turned around the company's image.

In September 2000, Wickes was purchased by Focus Group, with backing from Duke Street Capital. This deal eventually made Focus Group the UK's second largest home improvement retailer, behind B&Q. Thirty-six Focus stores were rebranded to Focus DIY, growing Wickes from 131 stores in October 2000 to 172 in March 2004.

In December 2004, Focus Group sold Wickes to Travis Perkins. The sale was completed in February 2005.

Wickes acquired seven stores from a struggling Focus DIY in October 2007, after Cerberus Capital took it over in June 2007 for £1; these stores were in Glossop, Mansfield, Penrith, Bulwell, Plumstead, Dumfries and Hereford.

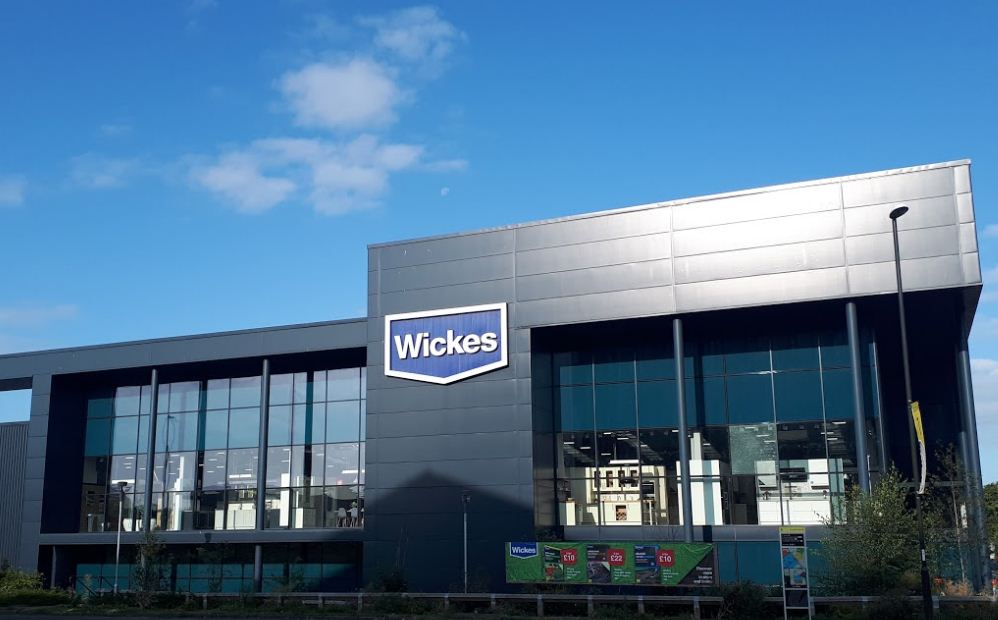
New-style Wickes store, Crawley, West Sussex (2019)

In December 1996, the management of Wickes decided to cut back its operations in France, Belgium and the Netherlands and to concentrate solely on its operations in the United Kingdom. All mainland operations in Europe were sold to the French do it yourself chain, Bricorama, in June 1997. The company's joint venture in South Africa ended in February 1997.

In May 2011, it was announced that Wickes had purchased thirteen stores from the appointed administrators of Focus DIY, Ernst & Young, saving 345 jobs. By 2017, the company had over two hundred stores in the United Kingdom.

The company had entered into a franchise agreement for the Wickes brand to be operated in Ireland by a subsidiary of Moritz Holdings, an Irish developer. The first store opened in Limerick. Moritz had planned to open fifteen stores within five years, but initial plans for a €30 million expansion were later put on hold, pending an assessment of market conditions, in April 2009. The franchise relationship ended in February 2013, with the store closed down, and the liquidator was "denied access" to the store.

In May 2018, BBC News Online reported that Wickes planned to cut a third of its head office workforce in a bid to reduce costs. Parent company Travis Perkins said the cuts would affect workers in Watford, Hertfordshire, where it employed three hundred people.

In July 2019, along with reports of sales being up 9.7%, the parent company of Wickes, Travis Perkins, announced plans to action a demerger and spin off Wickes, quoting Wickes "is well positioned to thrive as a stand alone business" and "will have the autonomy to execute on its strategy and allocate capital to its customer proposition and growth opportunities with a clearer focus." In April 2021, it was confirmed that Wickes would be demerged from Travis Perkins by the end of the month.

The demerger was completed on 28 April 2021, with Wickes Group plc launching on the London Stock Exchange.

In June 2023, Wickes' ex-Chief Operating Officer Fraser Longden caused controversy by labelling some customers "bigots" over their perceived attitudes to transgender people. The company has supported various LGBTQ+ events.
