= Eamonn & Ruth: How the Other Half Lives =

- Genre: Documentary
- Presented by: Eamonn Holmes; Ruth Langsford
- Country of origin: United Kingdom
- Original language: English
- No. of series: 5
- No. of episodes: 21 (inc. specials)

Production
- Running time: 60 minutes (inc. adverts)
- Production companies: Spun Gold Television and Motion Content Group

Original release
- Network: Channel 5
- Release: 27 October 2015 – 29 March 2019

How the Other Half Lives is a British documentary series that began airing on 27 October 2015 on Channel 5. The programme is presented by Eamonn Holmes and Ruth Langsford.

The first series aired from 27 October 2015 until 1 December 2015, the second series from 13 September until 18 October 2016, the third series from 3 July until 17 July 2017, and the fourth series from 14 July until 14 December 2018. The fifth series started in March 2019.

== Synopsis ==
Holmes and Langsford find out what life is like for some of the richest people in Britain and overseas.

== Episodes ==
=== Transmissions ===
- Official viewing figures are from BARB.

Series	Start date	End date	Episodes	Average viewers (millions)
1	27 October 2015	1 December 2015	6	1.35
2	13 September 2016	18 October 2016	6	1.33
Special	24 December 2016		1	1.14
3	3 July 2017	17 July 2017	3	1.42
4	19 July 2018	14 December 2018	3	1.14
5	22 March 2019	29 March 2019	2	—N/a

=== Series 1 (2015) ===
Official viewing figures are from BARB.

Episode	Original Air Date	Description	Viewers (millions)	Weekly Channel 5 rank
1	27 October 2015	In the first episode of the series, Eamonn spends a day with Emin Agalarov, a businessman and popstar. He takes a ride in his private jet whilst Ruth browses through some expensive wedding dresses.	1.77	1
2	3 November 2015	In this episode Eamonn and Ruth attend the Royal Regatta in Henley and meet some of those who send their children to public schools	1.51	3
3	10 November 2015	Eamonn and Ruth look around a mansion worth £20million, with its own bowling alley, football pitch, golf course and swimming pool.	1.38	6
4	17 November 2015	In episode 4, Eamonn and Ruth talk to Chris Dawson, founder of retail store The Range and they attend the Tusk Trust charity gala, organised by Deborah Meaden.	1.26	5
5	24 November 2015	In this episode, Eamonn and Ruth visit a £30 million hotel, and talk to one of the world's leading interior designers Kelly Hoppen. They're also shown around super-yachts in Ibiza.	1.07	10
6	1 December 2015	In the final episode of the series, Eamonn visits celebrity hairdresser Nicky Clarke's salon and they sample the world's most expensive cocktail.	1.11	13

=== Series 2 (2016) ===
Official viewing figures are from BARB.

Episode	Original Air Date	Description	Viewers (millions)	Weekly Channel 5 rank
1	13 September 2016	In the first episode of the second series, Eamonn and Ruth are in New York City, meeting some of the city's richest residents, including a father and son duo running a hotel empire valued in the billions.	1.35	5
2	20 September 2016	Eamonn and Ruth talk to David Sullivan, one of Britain's newest billionaires, who bought out West Ham FC and Eamonn looks around a super-yacht.	1.33	4
3	27 September 2016	The couple meet Dr Mohammad Zahoor and his wife Kamaliya in Kiev, Ukraine, to see how the extravagant billionaire couple have spent some of their fortune. Ruth also meets designer Jody Bell at the luxurious Wellesley Hotel in London, to discuss her quest to become a high-street name in the fashion world.	1.29	6
4	4 October 2016	In this episode, the couple meet the Duchess of Rutland, Emma Manners who lives in Belvoir Castle in Leicestershire.	1.48	4
5	11 October 2016	Poker player Liv Boeree talks about the risks of the game and the creator of Moshi Monsters talks to Eamonn and Ruth.	1.12	14
6	18 October 2016	Blowing a Fortune. In the last episode of the series, Eamonn and Ruth take a look around a Regent's Park apartment, worth £20million and Eamonn is shown a £2million Bugatti Veyron.	1.40	3

=== Christmas special ===
Official viewing figures are from BARB.

Episode	Original Air Date	Description	Viewers (millions)	Weekly Channel 5 rank
1	24 December 2016	A Christmas edition of the show titled A Million Pound Christmas. Eamonn and Ruth are given £1million to spend on Christmas.	1.14	8

=== Series 3 (2017) ===
Official viewing figures are from BARB.

Episode	Original Air Date	Description	Viewers (millions)	Weekly Channel 5 rank
1	3 July 2017	The first episode in this series is called Eamonn & Ruth Do Dubai. They find a bunch of roses that live forever, business cards that cost £1500 each, the tallest building in the world with multi-millionaire residents, and a police force whose cars include Lamborghinis, Ferraris and Bugattis.	1.79	1
2	10 July 2017	This episode is called Eamonn & Ruth: Silver Service. Eamonn Holmes and Ruth Langsford delve into the world of the landed gentry, trying their hands at clay-pigeon shooting with hand-engraved shotguns worth £100,000 each. The Queen's former butler instructs them in the subtle art of etiquette, while Her Majesty's official sculptor immortalises Eamonn's head in a traditional clay bust, before the couple find themselves partying with the daughters of high society at the elegant and exclusive Debutante's Ball.	1.18	11
3	17 July 2017	This episode is called Eamonn & Ruth: Russian Roulette. Eamonn Holmes and Ruth Langsford head to Moscow to infiltrate the exclusive world of billionaire oligarchs. They meet the son of one of Russia's wealthiest men, as well as the owner of an exclusive department store in the city, and learn about the whims of the Russian elite.	1.30	9

=== Series 4 (2018) ===
Official viewing figures are from BARB.

Episode	Original Air Date	Description	Viewers (millions)	Weekly Channel 5 rank
1	19 July 2018	Eamonn Holmes and Ruth Langsford explore more extravagant lifestyles with a visit to Monte Carlo, the playground of the glamorous super-rich. They rub shoulders with the likes of former Formula 1 boss Flavio Briatore, who invites the couple into his ultra-exclusive club, and discover just how little $30million will buy in the most crowded and expensive property market on earth. The couple also visit the Monte Carlo Casino and are let loose in a wine cellar estimated to be worth 80million euros.	1.08	6
2	2 August 2018	Eamonn Holmes and Ruth Langsford get under the skin of the beauty regimes of the super-rich, discovering that to look a million dollars it might actually cost much more. They talk to reality TV star Natalie Richardson, who has spent a fortune on cosmetic surgery, and also meet a designer to the stars whose clients think nothing of spending £4million a year on their wardrobes. Ruth also visits an exclusive children's clothing store, where a mum is about to spend £1,200 on a party outfit for her four-year-old.	1.12	11
3	14 December 2018	This episode is called Eamonn & Ruth Do Vegas . Eamonn Holmes and Ruth Langsford join some of them to investigate the outrageous lifestyles of the super-rich. Four out of the five richest people in the region are casino moguls, and Eamonn and Ruth meet one of the most outspoken, Derek Stevens.	1.21	7

=== Series 5 (2019) ===
Official viewing figures are from BARB.

Episode	Original Air Date	Description	Viewers (millions)	Weekly Channel 5 rank
1	22 March 2019	This episode is called Eamonn & Ruth: In Search of George Clooney. Eamonn Holmes and Ruth Langsford visit Milan, home to more wealthy Italians than anywhere else in the country. They get caught up in the excitement of Milan Fashion Week, take etiquette lessons from the wife of a politician and Ruth goes shopping for haute couture doggy clothes with Audrey Titto - Italy's answer to Paris Hilton. The couple also visit the huge villa of the Del Bonos, one of Milan's oldest families, and end their trip at the weekend retreat of Lake Como, where Ruth is eager to catch a glimpse of its most famous resident, George Clooney.	—N/a	—N/a
2	29 March 2019	Eamonn Holmes and Ruth Langsford meet the who's who of Britain's rich list to work out their secret rules. Jacqueline Gold, the extraordinary force behind Ann Summers, welcomes them into her luxury home to explain the importance of having a revolutionary idea. She also teaches Ruth the ins-and-outs of hosting the perfect sex toy party. Then duo then meet millionaire philanthropist Jack Petchey, still working hard at the age of 91, to learn how much of the secret is simply hard graft. Plus, the man who claims to be the highest paid life coach in the UK offers some advice.	—N/a	—N/a
