= It's Not Me, It's You (game show) =

British TV show

- Genre: Comedy panel game
- Directed by: Barbara Wiltshire
- Presented by: Eamonn Holmes
- Starring: Kelly Brook; Vicky Pattison
- Voices of: Christopher Biggins
- Composer: Dobs Vye
- Country of origin: United Kingdom
- No. of series: 1
- No. of episodes: 8

Production
- Executive producers: Darren Smith; Beren Money
- Editor: Matt Roberts
- Running time: 60 minutes (inc. adverts)

Original release
- Network: Channel 5
- Release: 23 June – 19 August 2016

It's Not Me, It's You is a British comedy panel game show that aired on Channel 5 from 23 June to 19 August 2016 and is hosted by Eamonn Holmes, with Kelly Brook and Vicky Pattison as team captains.

== Background ==
It's Not Me, It's You follows a loose theme of dating, and has been described as a more formal Celebrity Juice: Brook had previously covered for Fearne Cotton on Celebrity Juice while she was on maternity leave, and Holmes and Pattison have both appeared on the show.

== Format ==
The first round, Deal Breakers, sees the teams trying to predict whether the audience considered something acceptable or unacceptable, such as whether a wacky marriage proposal was a deal-breaker or not; in the fourth episode, the team guessed which one of the three members of the opposing team were responsible for a quote in a round called First Impressions.

The second round is specific to the panellists: In the first and fourth episodes, before the break there was a video which the panellists were shown half of and had to guess the contents of the second half. In Episode 1, this was followed by a round called "Shake Your Tail Feather" due to that show's panellists including Anton du Beke and Frankie Bridge and was where they demonstrated a dance which the rest of the panellists have to guess whether the dance originated from a man or from a beast; the fourth episode saw the panellists trying to guess the opposing team's celebrity crushes. The second episode included "Steph & Dom's Love Potions", where two of its panellists tried to identify a concoction's purpose from drinking it, and also included a round called "Bonkbusters", where teams had to identify the longest chain of celebrity romances from a Blockbusters-style grid; the third episode contained "Eye of the Cougar" in honour of Lesley Joseph which saw her trying to match up five occupations with the five men in front of her. The fourth saw panellist Chris Kamara trying to remember his wife's birthday and wedding anniversary. Subsequent episodes were cut down to 30 minutes from 45 minutes, so it is not known what would have been played in those episodes.

Next, "You Complete Me" sees panellists trying to complete a celebrity quote with certain salient words missing. The third episode followed this with a version of Play Your Cards Right where the teams had to guess whether the celebrity had more or less reported infidelities.

The final round of the show, "Love at First Swipe", sees the captains interacting with sixteen men, eight men each, that have been selected by a member of the audience using a Tinder-style game on a giant screen and they have to try to guess which men she picked.

== Episodes ==
The coloured backgrounds denote the result of each of the shows:

indicates Kelly's team won
indicates Vicky's team won
indicates the game ended in a draw

No.	Kelly's guests	Vicky's guests	Score	Original release date
1	Stephen Bailey and Anton du Beke	Frankie Bridge and Katherine Ryan	3–9	23 June 2016
2	Chris Ramsey and Dom Parker	Steph Parker and Martine McCutcheon	24–22	30 June 2016
3	Matt Richardson and Spencer Matthews	Lesley Joseph and Rob Delaney	12–13	7 July 2016
4	Chris Ramsey and Nina Wadia	Katherine Ryan, (Note: Pattison did not attend the recording of this episode.) Stacey Solomon and Chris Kamara	23–20	14 July 2016
5	Hal Cruttenden and Louie Spence	Gemma Collins and Matt Richardson	3–4	29 July 2016
6	Martin Kemp and Róisín Conaty	Kimberley Walsh and Chris Ramsey	6–4	5 August 2016
7	Stephen Bailey and Joey Essex	Sally Lindsay and Andrew Maxwell	5–5	12 August 2016
8	Carol Vorderman and Al Porter	Russell Kane and Ruth Langsford	5–7	19 August 2016

== Scores ==
Kelly	Vicky
Series wins (0 drawn)
0	1
Episode wins (1 drawn)
3	4

== Critical reception ==
Simon Duke of ChronicleLive noted that the show "allowed us to switch off from the serious side of life for 45 minutes and feel as if we were having a slightly intoxicated chat at a mates' house", while Matt Baylis of The Daily Express described it as a "carefully scripted and painstakingly rehearsed set-piece", and concluded his review with the sentence: "There was a script, they were plodding through it, having fun along the way and also being pretty funny."
