= Wolseley UK =

British building materials supplier

Wolseley UK Limited
- Type: Privately held company
- Founded: 1887; 139 years ago
- Headquarters: Warwick
- Area served: United Kingdom
- Owner: Clayton, Dubilier & Rice
- Website: www.wolseley.co.uk

Wolseley UK Limited, headquartered in Warwick, is a distributor of building materials and is the largest trade specialist in plumbing and heating in the UK. It is owned by Clayton, Dubilier & Rice, a private equity firm.

== History ==
=== 19th century origins ===
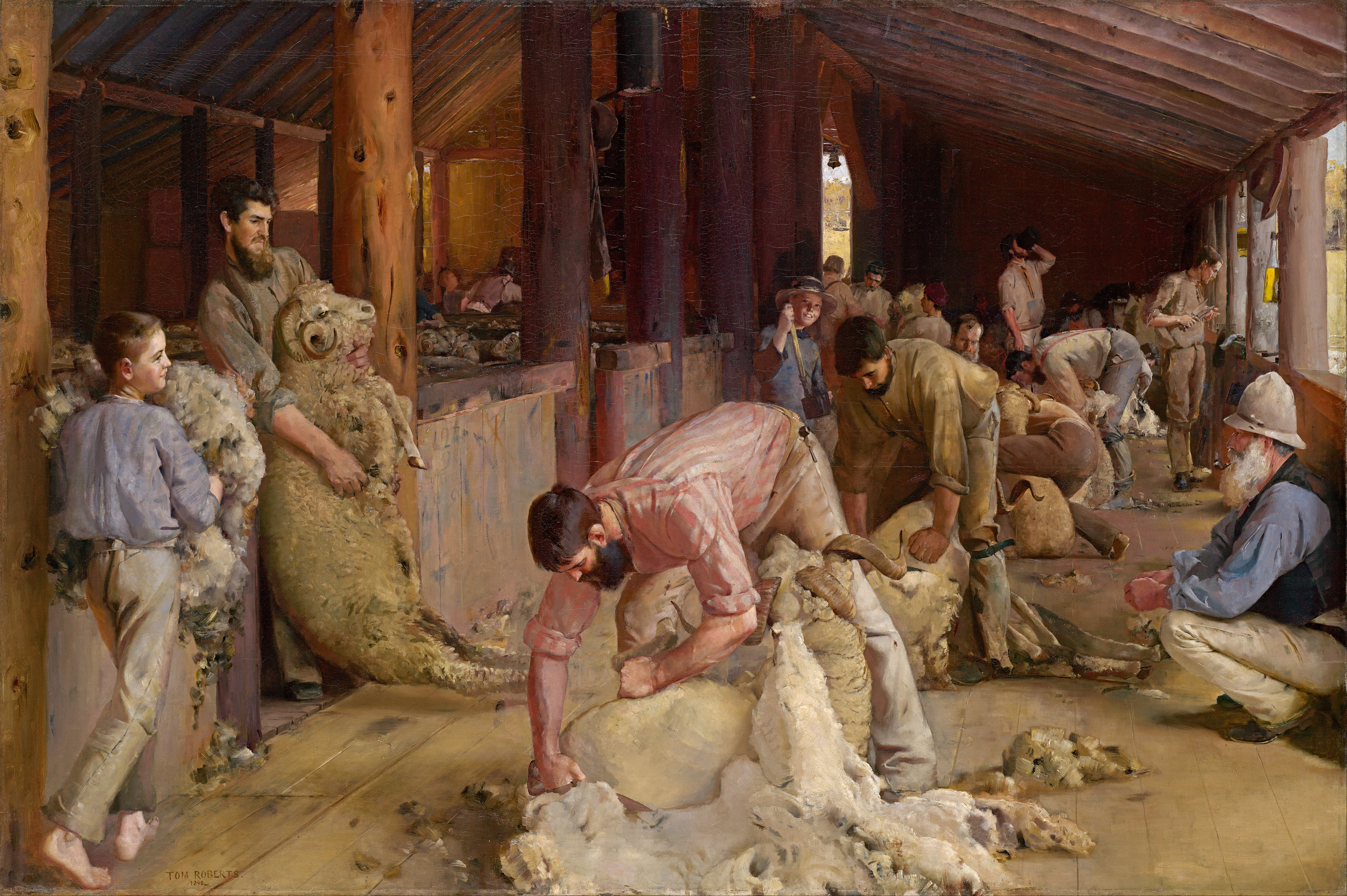
1888 (Shearing the rams) the hard work revolutionised by Wolseley

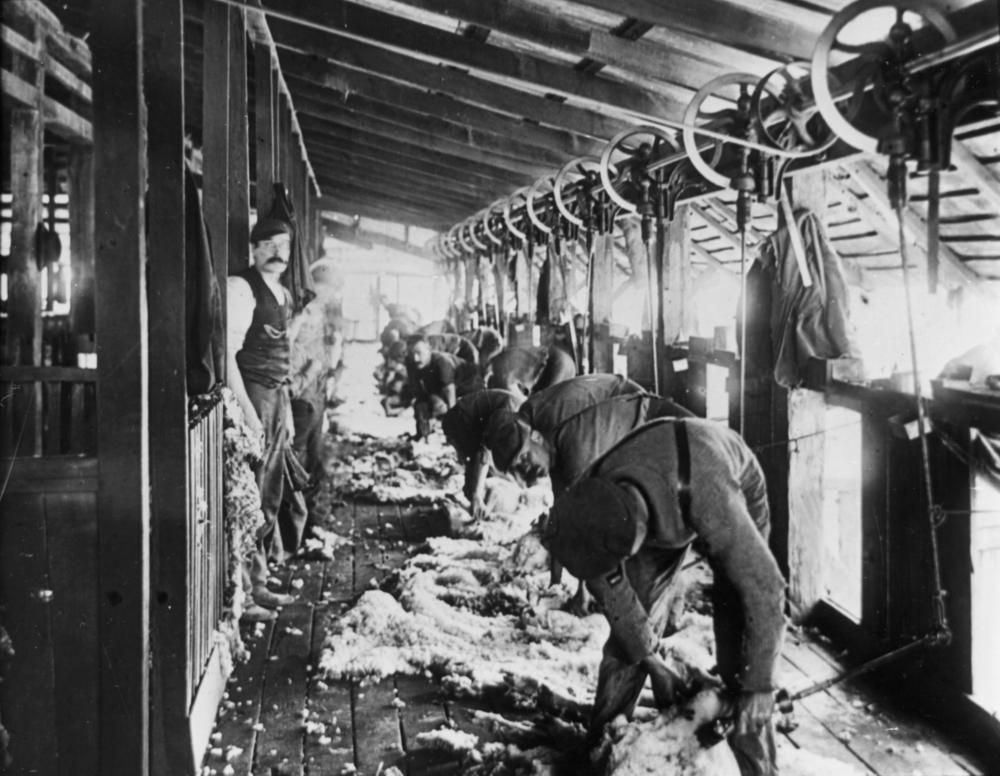
1895

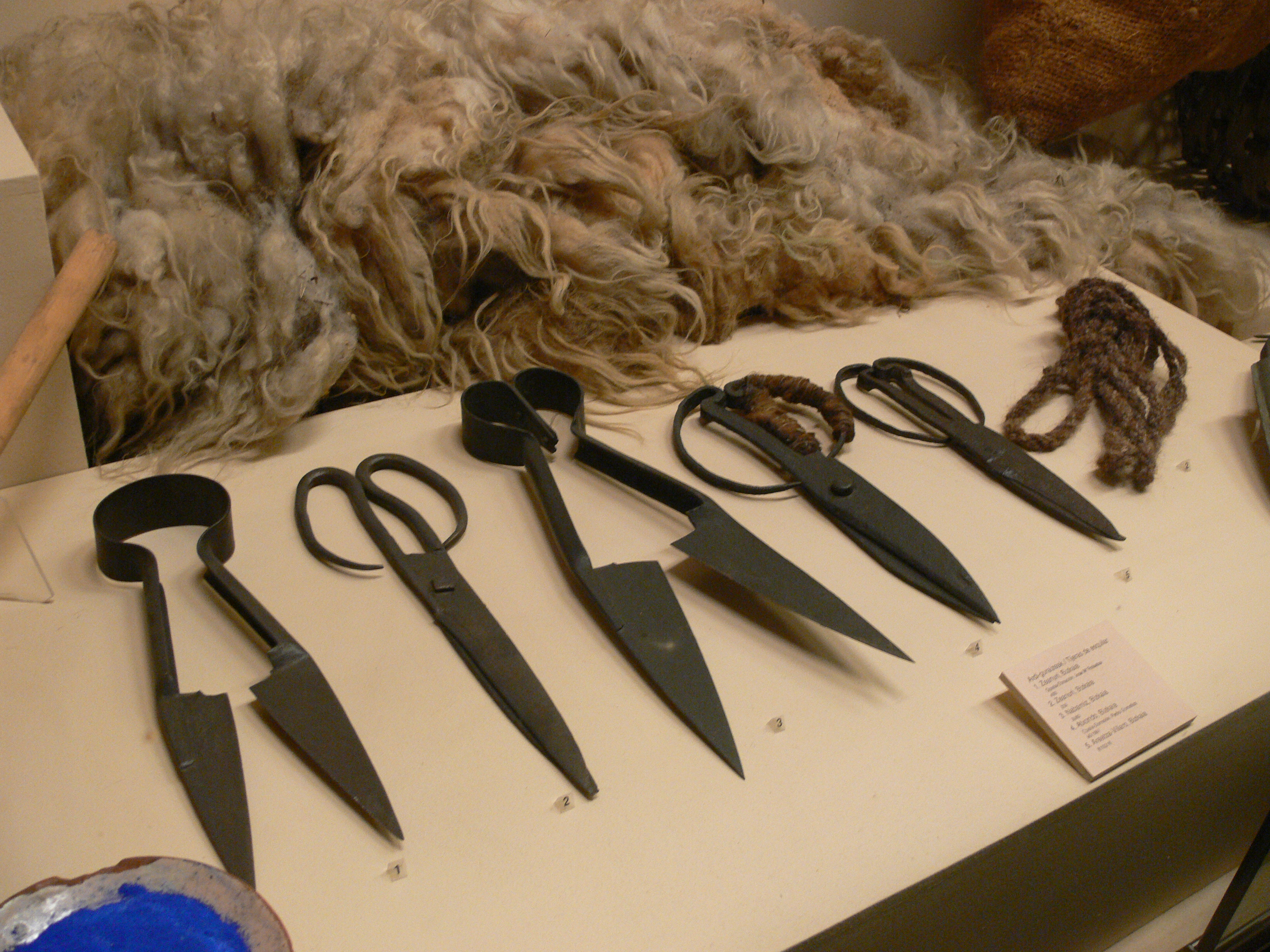
Traditional sheep shears

Frederick Wolseley, owner of a large sheep station in Sydney, Australia, set up The Wolseley Sheep Shearing Machine Company in 1887. He patented a sheep shearing invention in March 1877. He manufactured the sheep shearing machinery largely by assembling bought-in components. He established a company of the same name, with £200,000 in investor capital, in London, in 1889, but all operations remained in Australia. Herbert Austin, who had worked on the product's development in Melbourne Australia from 1887, was appointed its manager and received a share of its equity.

Wolseley's first sheep shearing machinery was driven by horse power, replaced later by stationary engines. Following wide demonstrations in eastern Australia and New Zealand in 1887 and 1888, a woolshed in Louth, New South Wales, was set up with the machinery and was the first to complete a shearing with the machines. Eighteen more woolsheds were equipped with Wolseley's invention in 1888. The Australian incorporation was wound up and the business's ownership transferred to the new London company in 1889 but operations were retained in Australia.

There is a Wolseley brand two-stand portable shearing plant in the collection of the National Museum of Australia in Canberra.

In the early 1890s, Austin studied Wolseley's shearing machinery in use on a large sheep station and patented several improvements. In 1893, it was discovered they had sold a large amount of defective machinery, brought about by the failure of local suppliers to meet the required specifications. Austin was sent to England to open a manufacturing operation. In November 1893, Wolseley and Austin arrived in England, where Austin managed the business from a small workshop in Broad Street, Birmingham. Wolseley, with his Australian pastoral interests, resigned in 1894 because of poor health.

Seeking other suitable products, Austin designed his first car in 1896, and for the next four years, continued to develop and improve his designs. Though the board did allow Austin to purchase some machinery to build cars, they decided around 1900, it was unlikely to be a profitable industry. In 1901, Wolseley Motors was acquired by Vickers.

=== 20th century ===
The postwar rise of synthetic textiles sharply reduced the demand for wool and the necessary machinery, and Wolseley diversified activities by buying Nu Way Heating in 1960 and Granville Controls and Yorkshire Heating Supplies in 1965.

The company entered the market in the United States by acquiring Ferguson Enterprises, a distributor of plumbing supplies, with around 50 branches on the East Coast of the United States, for $30.7 million in 1982. The company sold its Wolseley and Hughes engineering businesses in 1984, and since that time Wolseley has been mainly a distribution business. It bought Plumb Center from Marley in 1985.

Wolseley expanded to Europe by buying French plumbing supplies business Brossette in February 1992, and OAG from Wienerberger of Vienna in April 1994.

=== 21st century ===
Wolseley sold most of its remaining manufacturing businesses to the private equity firm Cinven for £215 million in April 2000. In 2005, the company moved its headquarters from Ripon, Yorkshire, to Leamington Spa, Warwickshire.

In 2003, the company acquired the bathroom brand Bathstore; it owned the business for 11 years before opting to sell them.

Wolseley ended its participation in the hire industry, selling Brandon Hire for £43 million in 2010. It sold Build Center to Jewson in 2011 and Electric Center to Edmundson Electrical in 2013. It sold ISB (Importation et Solution Bois) Group to its management in April 2015 and Bois & Matériaux to OpenGate Capital in November 2015.

Following a 2016 restructuring of the UK business, most of the trading brands were renamed, and brought under the single brand of Wolseley. In Scotland, it was a supplier of plumbing, heating and bathroom products, branded William Wilson. The company sold its Scandinavian businesses for €1 billion in March 2017.

Wolseley plc changed its name to Ferguson plc in July 2017. It relocated from Leamington Spa to Warwick in 2018, and sold Wolseley UK to Clayton, Dubilier & Rice, a private equity firm, for £308 million in January 2021. Wolseley UK went on to buy Graham Plumbers' Merchant stores from Saint-Gobain in July 2021.
