= Tony Wilkinson (businessman) =

Former co-owner and chair of Wilko (born 1937)

- Born: Anthony Harwick Wilkinson; April 1937 (age 89)
- Occupation: Businessman
- Years active: 1960–2005
- Title: Former co-owner & former chairman of retailer Wilko
- Board member of: Wilko
- Parent: James Kemsey Wilkinson

Anthony Harwick Wilkinson (born April 1937) is a British businessman, who was the co-owner and former chairman of the British high street chain Wilko.

== Early life ==
Anthony Harwick Wilkinson was born in April 1937, the son of Wilko founder James Kemsey Wilkinson and his wife Mary Cooper.

== Career ==
When Tony Wilkinson retired as chairman of Wilko after 45 years in June 2005, he was replaced by his niece, Karin Swann, and his daughter, Lisa Wilkinson. In 2014, Karin Swann sold her family's 50% holding in the business to Lisa Wilkinson.

In May 2019, the Sunday Times Rich List estimated his net worth at £252 million.

Following his retirement and Karin Swann's share sale, daughter Lisa Wilkinson oversaw the Wilko chain's eventual collapse, as it entered administration on 10 August 2023. PricewaterhouseCoopers (PwC) was appointed administrator to the business the same day.

During the administration of the business, it transpired its ownership had taken £77m out of the business in the preceding decade.

Business positions
Preceded by James Kemsey Wilkinson	Chairman of Wilko; 1997–2005	Succeeded by Lisa Wilkinson & Karin Swann
Preceded by James Kemsey Wilkinson	Co-owner of Wilko; 1997–2023	Succeeded by Lisa Wilkinson & Karin Swann
