= Gift Wrapped (game show) =

- Genre: Game show
- Created by: Stefan Iriarte
- Presented by: Eamonn Holmes; Ruth Langsford
- Country of origin: United Kingdom
- Original language: English
- No. of series: 1
- No. of episodes: 10

Production
- Running time: 60 minutes (inc. adverts)
- Production company: 12 Yard

Original release
- Network: ITV
- Release: 18 August – 29 August 2014

Gift Wrapped (previously called The Gift List) is a British game show that aired on ITV from 18 to 29 August 2014. It was hosted by Eamonn Holmes and Ruth Langsford.

== Gameplay ==
Three couples compete against each other in a series of quiz rounds for a chance to win all five of their selected prizes and a bonus holiday.

=== Round 1 ===
In the first round, nine categories are shown on the board, each consisting of nine questions. Each team chooses a category and must answer questions correctly in a row to earn points. Once a team misses a question or answers all nine questions correctly, their turn ends. The team with the most points on each turn gets to "unwrap" one of their "gifts". The round ends when each team has selected two categories.

=== Round 2 ===
In the second round, the teams take turns answering questions which require filling in the missing item from a series of lists. Each correct answer unwraps a team's gift. The first two teams to unwrap all five of their gifts move on to the next round, and the other leaves with nothing.

=== Round 3 ===
In the third round, each team faces five multiple choice questions, each containing three possible answers. Each question can have one, two, or three correct answers. Both teams alternate turns, whether they answered correctly or incorrectly. The first team to answer all five of their questions correctly unwraps their bonus holiday gift and moves on to the final round, the other leaves with nothing.

=== Final round ===
In the final round, the winning team has a chance to win all six of their prizes. One partner is sent offstage to an isolation booth. At the same time, the other is shown six categories and has 30 seconds (5 seconds per category) to create a list of items that describe each category. When time is up, the isolated partner is brought back onstage and must guess what each category is based on their partner's clues. Each correct answer wins the team one of their prizes with all six winning them the holiday in addition to their other five prizes.
