= Kitchen Burnout =

- Genre: Reality competition
- Created by: ITV Studios
- Presented by: Marco Pierre White
- Starring: See Celebrities
- Country of origin: United Kingdom
- Original language: English
- No. of series: 1
- No. of episodes: 7

Production
- Running time: 60 mins (including advertisements)
- Production company: ITV Studios

Original release
- Network: ITV
- Release: 16 April – 28 May 2010

Related
- ITV Food; Hell's Kitchen (2004–2009); Gordon Ramsay: Cookalong Live (2008)

Kitchen Burnout is a British cookery reality show airing on ITV, and was created by ITV Studios, which features prospective chefs competing with each other for a final prize. The series aired in April 2010, presented by Marco Pierre White. The programme did not return for a second series due to poor ratings.

== Celebrities ==
The celebrities taking part are:

Automatic Qualification
Saved By Marco
Eliminated

Celebrity	Round	Status
Donna Air	Heat One; 16 April 2010	Heat Winner
Kelvin MacKenzie	Heat One; 16 April 2010	Eliminated
Tupele Dorgu	Heat One; 16 April 2010	Saved
Elen Rives	Heat Two; 23 April 2010	Heat Winner
Mark Watson	Heat Two; 23 April 2010	Eliminated
Ruth Langsford	Heat Two; 23 April 2010	Saved
Debra Stephenson	Heat Three; 30 April 2010	Heat Winner
Jason Byrne	Heat Three; 30 April 2010	Eliminated
Nancy Dell'Olio	Heat Three; 30 April 2010	Saved
Alex Ferns	Heat Four; 7 May 2010	Saved
Carol Smillie	Heat Four; 7 May 2010	Eliminated
Russell Grant	Heat Four; 7 May 2010	Heat Winner
Ruth Langsford	Semi-Final 1; 14 May 2010	Eliminated 1st
Tupele Dorgu	Semi-Final 1; 14 May 2010	Eliminated 2nd
Nancy Dell'Olio	Semi-Final 1; 14 May 2010	Eliminated 3rd
Alex Ferns	Semi-Final 1; 14 May 2010	Finalist
Donna Air	Semi-Final 2; 21 May 2010	Eliminated 1st
Russell Grant	Semi-Final 2; 21 May 2010	Eliminated 2nd
Debra Stephenson	Semi-Final 2; 21 May 2010	Eliminated 3rd
Elen Rives	Semi-Final 2; 21 May 2010	Finalist
Alex Ferns	Final; 28 May 2010	Winner
Elen Rives	Final; 28 May 2010	Finalist
