= Chris Dawson (businessman) =

British billionaire businessman

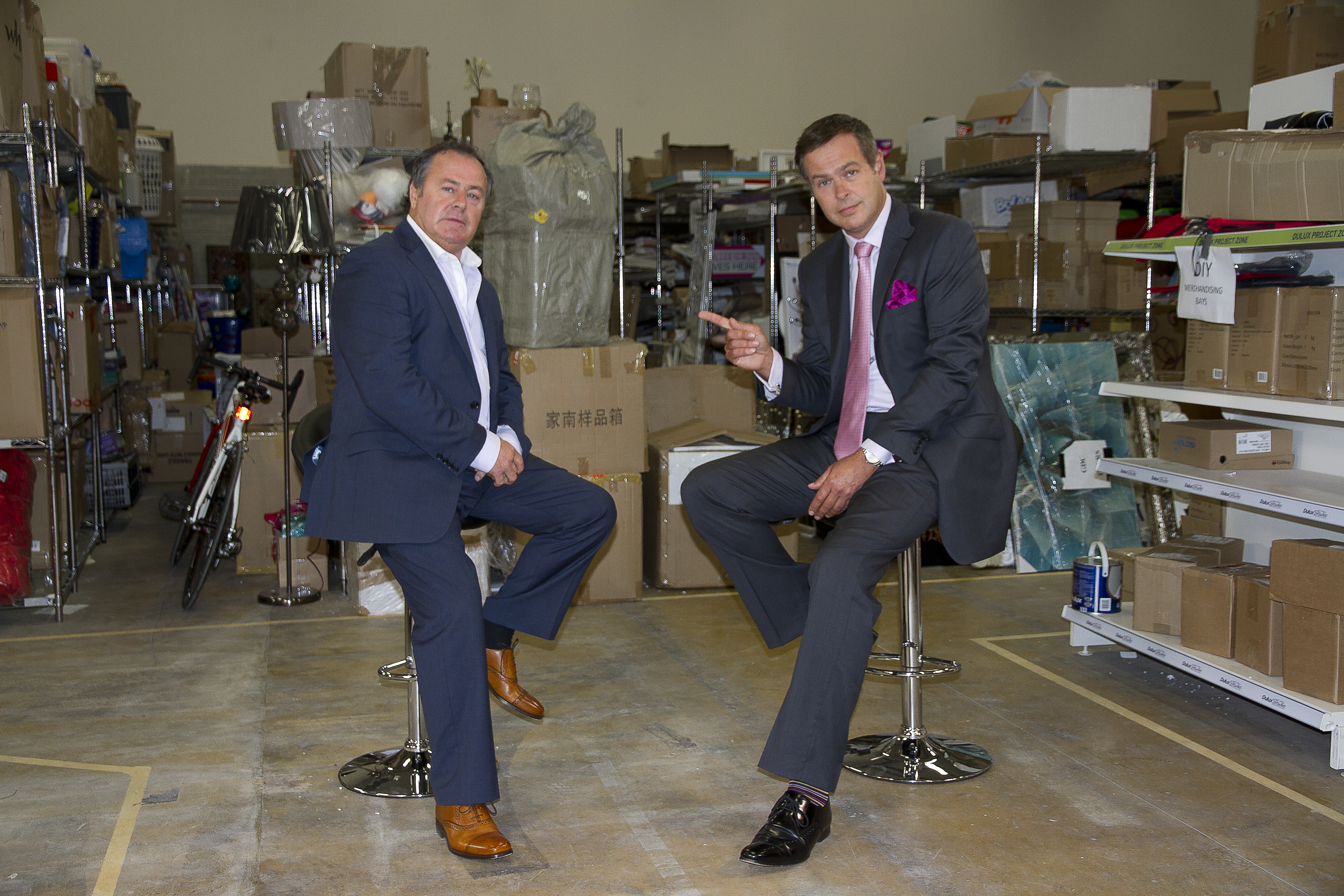
- Dawson (left) and Peter Jones (right) in 2012
- Born: Christopher Frederick Dawson; 15 February 1952 (age 74); Plymouth, England
- Education: Plymstock School
- Occupation: Businessman
- Known for: The Range
- Spouse: Sarah Dawson
- Children: 2

Christopher Frederick Dawson (born 15 February 1952) is a British billionaire businessman best known as the founder and executive chairman of CDS Superstores (trading as The Range and Wilko).

CDS acquired the intellectual property of Wilko in September 2023, and later acquired 49 Homebase stores, alongside its intellectual property, in November 2024.

The ultimate owner is Dawson's wife, who registers as a resident in Jersey, a place that offers tax savings over UK resident individuals.

== Early life ==
Dawson was born in Plymouth, Devon, the son of a market trader. He grew up in Hooe. He attended Hooe Primary School and then Plymstock School. Dawson attended school irregularly, struggled with dyslexia, and left at 15 years old with few qualifications. He has since returned to Hooe Primary School to discuss business studies with students.

== Career ==
Dawson started as a market trader in Plymouth. He sold seafood from the back of a van with his father, and later started his own venture selling perfume and jewellery from a suitcase.

Chris Dawson Superstores was formed in 1989, and opened an outlet store in Sugar Mill Business Park. The CDS Superstores name would later be changed to The Range.

A 'The Range Home, Garden & Leisure' brand store was opened in Cardiff in February 2000; Dawson later bought the business park where this store sits. The Range was featured in The Sunday Times Top Track 250 companies from 2003 to 2012, once ranking at number 48. In 2015 the retail chain has about 100 stores, all of which are owned directly by Dawson.

In April 2019, Dawson handed all his shares to his wife Sarah Dawson, who resides in Jersey for tax purposes.

Dawson now has 256 stores under The Range branding and also owns the Wilko and Homebase brands.

Dawson's CDS Superstores International company started a subsidiary, CDS Group Services, a shop fitting company that has clients that include Lego, Lush Cosmetics, Levi's jeans and sister company The Range. CDS Group Services was listed in twelfth place in the Real Business Hot 100 Companies in 2012.

== Awards and recognition ==
Dawson was an ambassador for the Channel 4 Jobs Report in 2012, named the Ernst & Young Overall Entrepreneur of the Year in 2011, and in the same year advised the Prime Minister David Cameron on issues facing growing businesses. In 2012 he was interviewed by Justin Leigh on BBC Radio Devon.

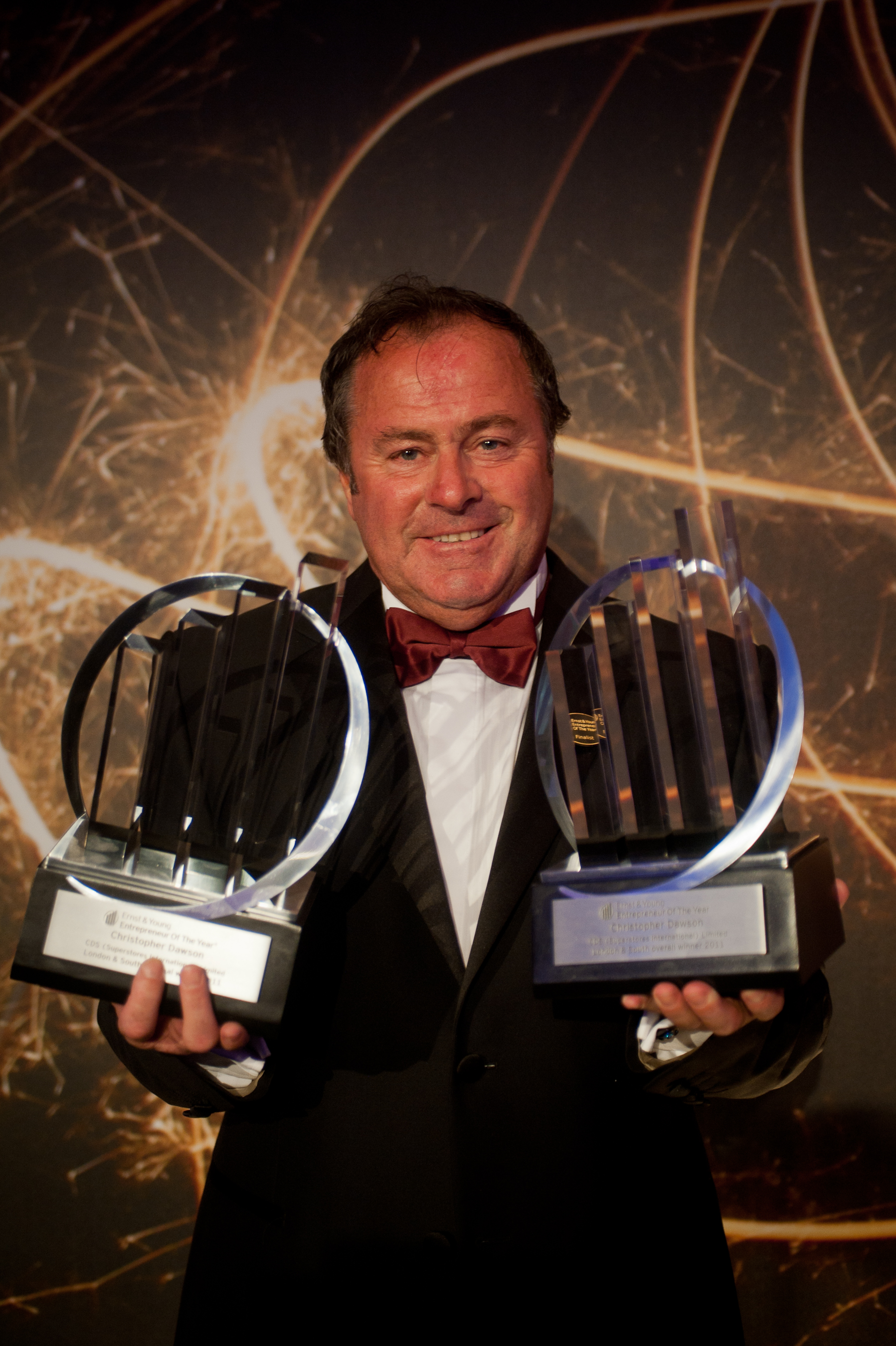
Chris Dawson accepts his Ernst & Young awards

Dawson was interviewed in 2013 for the series Peter Jones Meets.

In 2013, Dawson's businesses had an estimated worth to 585 million pounds. He has established several other companies involved in property, dry cleaning, manufacturing and waste management services.

In April 2015, the Sunday Times Rich List reported that his net worth was £1.65 billion which by March 2017 had increased to nearly £2.0 billion.

From 2019 to 2024, Dawson and his wife appeared in the Sunday Times Tax List within the top 100 highest taxpayers.

== Personal life ==
Dawson lives in Plymouth with his wife Sarah. They have two children who also work for The Range family business.

According to the Sunday Times Rich List in 2022, Dawson and his family are worth £2.25 billion, an increase of £200 million from 2021.

Dawson notably owns a yellow Lamborghini Urus with the personalised number plate "DE11 BOY", a reference to the fictional character Del Boy Trotter. This has led him to be dubbed by some media outlets as the "del boy billionaire". He additionally owns an orange Lamborghini Revuelto with the registration "DAW 50N" in reference to his surname.
