= Eamonn Holmes =

Northern Irish television presenter (born 1959)

Eamonn Holmes OBE
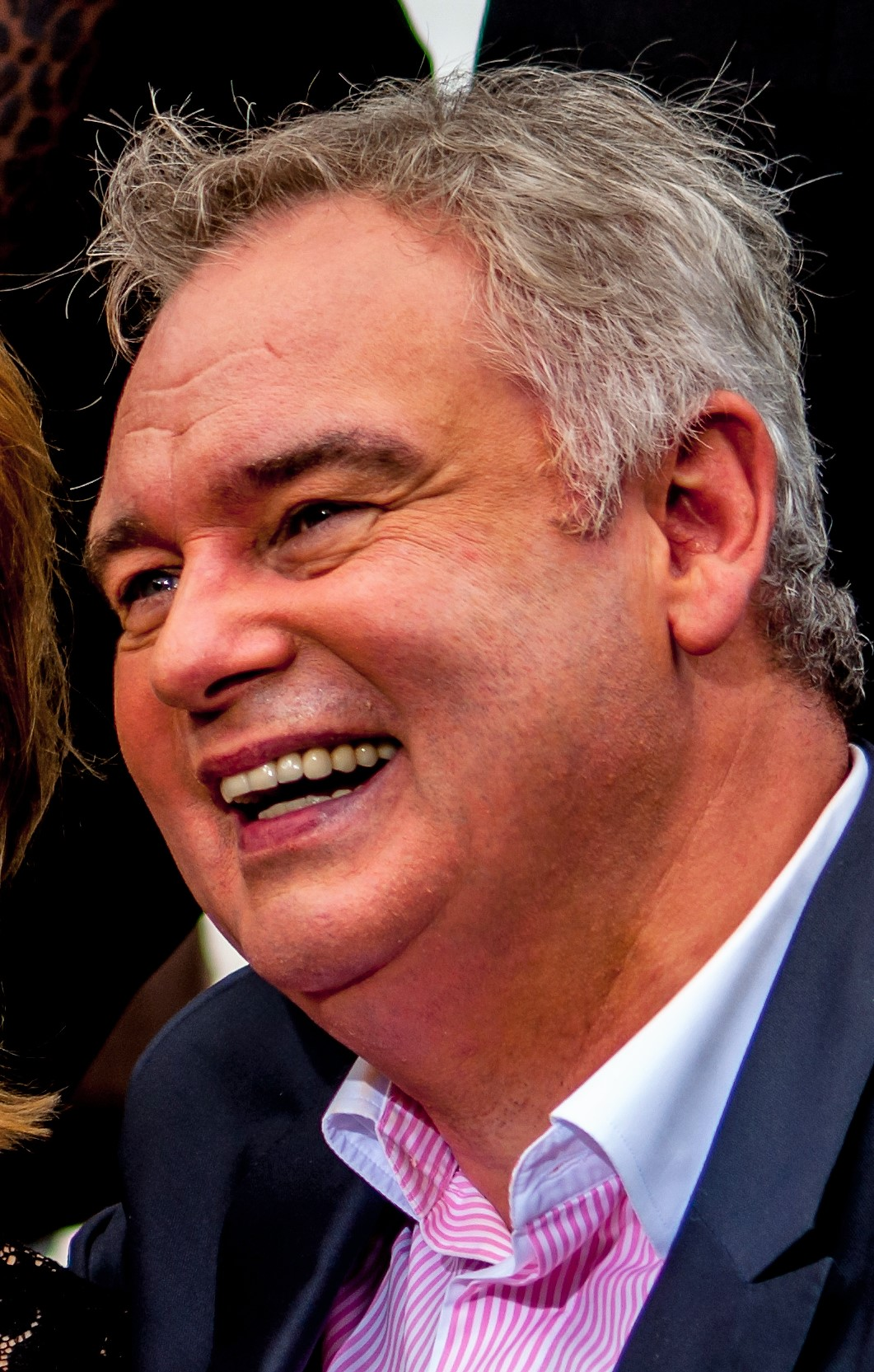
- Holmes in 2013
- Born: 3 December 1959 (age 66); Belfast, Northern Ireland
- Occupations: Broadcaster; journalist
- Years active: 1979–present
- Employer(s): ITV (former); Channel 5 (former); Sky News (former); GB News
- Television: This Morning (ITV)
- Spouses: Gabrielle Doherty (m. 1987; div. 2005) Ruth Langsford (m. 2010; sep. 2024)
- Children: 4

Eamonn Holmes (/ˈeɪmən/; born 3 December 1959) is a Northern Irish broadcaster and journalist.

Holmes co-presented ITV's breakfast programme for GMTV from 1993 to 2005, before presenting Sunrise on Sky News between 2005 and 2016. From 2006 to 2021 he co-presented ITV's This Morning with his then-wife Ruth Langsford on Fridays and also during school holidays. In 2022 he began presenting the breakfast programme on GB News, originally alongside Isabel Webster. Holmes has also fronted a range of factual and entertainment series, including How the Other Half Lives (2015–2019) and It's Not Me, It's You (2016) for Channel 5.

Holmes was appointed Officer of the Order of the British Empire (OBE) for services to broadcasting in the 2018 New Year Honours. He supports several charities, including Dogs Trust, Variety GB, and the Northern Ireland Kidney Patients' Association.

== Early life and education ==
Eamonn Holmes was born on 3 December 1959 in Belfast, Northern Ireland. He was educated at Holy Family Primary School and St Malachy's College, Belfast, before attending the Dublin College of Business Studies.

== Career ==
=== Early career ===
Holmes' first job in broadcasting was in 1979, when he joined Ulster Television (UTV) as a host and reporter for the station's Farming Ulster programme. He later worked with UTV sports reporters Leslie Dawes and Jackie Fullerton, assisting in coverage of sporting events across the region.

In September 1982, Holmes moved into news and current affairs when he was appointed anchor of UTV's flagship programme Good Evening Ulster programme. He succeeded Gary Gillespie and Gerry Kelly, who had replaced Gloria Hunniford earlier that year. Hunniford had presented the programme since its launch in 1979.

Alongside his news work, Holmes hosted several other UTV productions, including the Miss Northern Ireland gala specials in 1985 and 1986. During his time with the station he won a Hometown Radio Award. He left UTV in 1986 to join the BBC. At the corporation's Manchester studios, he presented the daytime programme Open Air, broadcast nationally on BBC1.

=== Television presenting ===
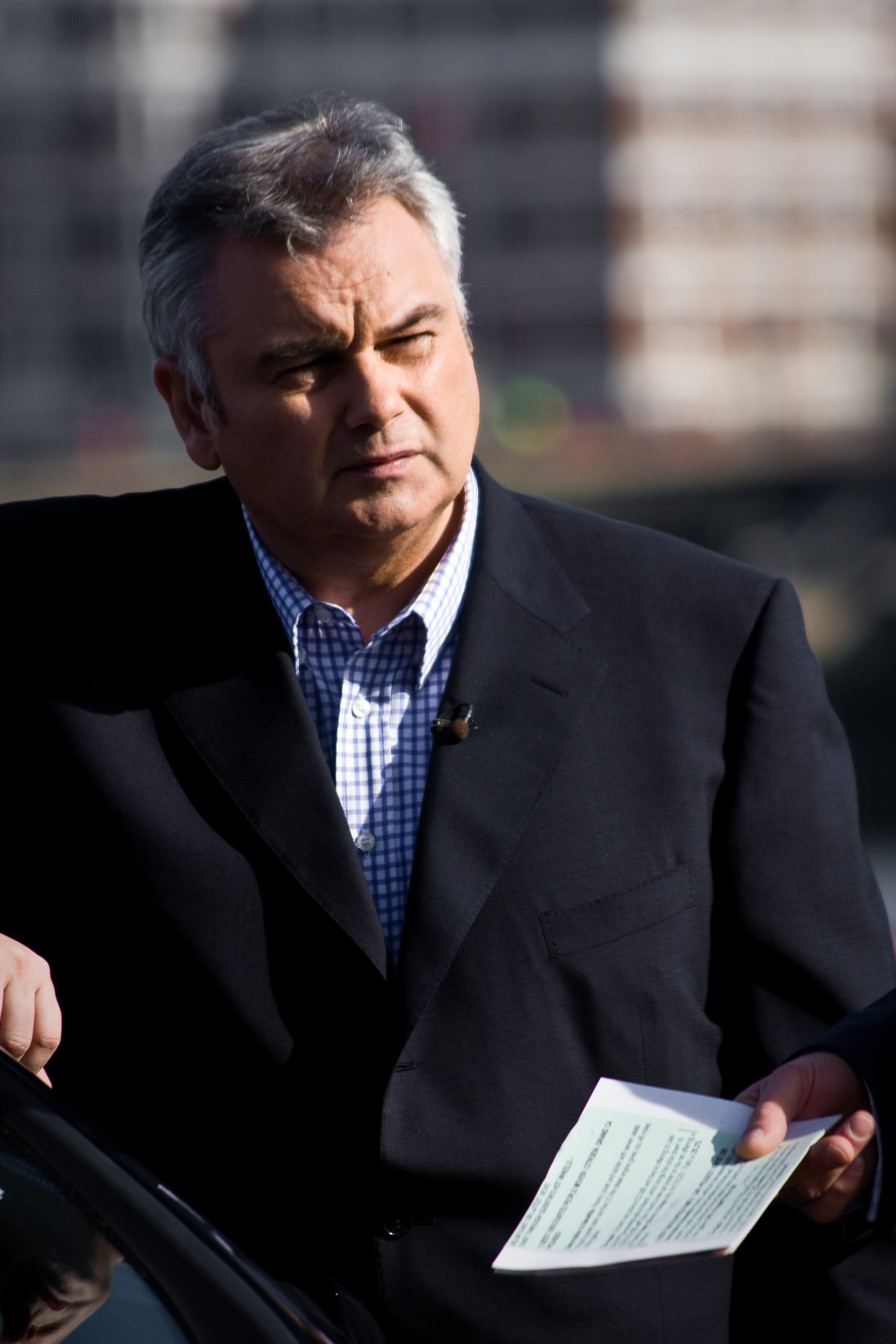
Holmes in 2009

Holmes has presented television coverage of snooker, horse racing, darts, and tennis, and fronted ITV's coverage of the Phil Taylor vs. Raymond van Barneveld darts event at the Wembley Conference Centre in 1999.

In 1993, Holmes joined GMTV, hosting the first edition of the programme on 1 January alongside Anne Davies. In 1997, he had a falling-out with co-host Anthea Turner, although the pair were later reunited on the BBC Northern Ireland series The Friday Show in 2009.

From 2001 to 2007, he presented the BBC National Lottery game show Jet Set.

Holmes left GMTV in April 2005, stating that the programme had become overly focused on celebrity news.

Six months later, he joined Sky News to present the relaunched Sunrise programme. He co-hosted the show with Lorna Dunkley from 2005 to 2007, Charlotte Hawkins from 2007 to 2014, and Isabel Webster from 2014 to 2016.

Between December 2005 and March 2007, Holmes presented the BBC quiz show SUDO-Q. In 2006, he began presenting This Morning on ITV on Friday editions, continuing until 2021.

Holmes hosted the US game show The Rich List in 2006. In 2009, he co-presented ITV's The Feelgood Factor with Myleene Klass, and between 2009 and 2014 presented eight episodes of Songs of Praise. In 2010, he guest-presented an episode of Have I Got News for You.

In 2014, Holmes and Ruth Langsford co-hosted the ITV daytime game show Gift Wrapped. The pair later presented the Channel 5 factual series Eamonn & Ruth: How the Other Half Lives, which aired from 2015 to 2017.

In 2016, Holmes presented the Channel 5 panel show It's Not Me, It's You, with Vicky Pattison and Kelly Brook as team captains.

Holmes was one of three relief presenters on Good Morning Britain between 2017 and 2018.

From March 2018, he co-presented Do the Right Thing with Langsford on Channel 5.

In December 2021, it was announced that Holmes would join GB News, where he began presenting its new breakfast show with Isabel Webster from 4 January 2022.

In February 2020, Holmes lost a First Tier Tribunal regarding his employment status under IR35 rules, with the judge determining that his contract with ITV's This Morning amounted to employment. During the proceedings, Holmes described himself as "one of the best live television presenters in the country".

=== Other television work ===
In 2001, Holmes appeared on Lily Savage's Blankety Blank. In 2013, he was a judge on the CBBC talent search Blue Peter – You Decide.

Holmes has made four appearances on Who Wants to be a Millionaire?. He first appeared with Alex Ferguson on 25 December 2004, then with Kay Burley in August and September 2007. He returned with Langsford in May 2012, and again with Ferguson in December 2013 for the programme's final ITV episode. Holmes has also appeared on celebrity editions of Fifteen to One, Call My Bluff, All Star Mr & Mrs, Tipping Point: Lucky Stars, Catchphrase, and The Chase.

Holmes has been a regular contributor to Big Brother's Bit on the Side, and in 2015 was widely tipped as a potential housemate for Celebrity Big Brother 16. He has been a panellist on Through the Keyhole, appeared on ITV's Guess the Star in 2017, and since November 2017 has provided the voiceover for the CBeebies series Biggleton.

On 19 September 2021, Holmes was interviewed by Joe Duffy on The Meaning of Life on RTÉ One.

=== Radio ===
Holmes began his radio career at Downtown Radio, Northern Ireland's first commercial independent station, in the late 1980s.

From around 2003, he presented The Eamonn Holmes Show on BBC Radio 5 Live on Saturday mornings between 9 and 11 am, with his final programme airing on 30 May 2009. In 2005, he hosted a show on London station Magic 105.4.

In 2008, Holmes briefly took over Michael Parkinson's Sunday morning show on BBC Radio 2.

In 2016, he presented Let's Talk With Eamonn Holmes on Talkradio, broadcast on Saturdays from 6 am to 8 am and Sundays from 11 am to 1 pm.

From January 2018 until February 2020, he presented the weekday drivetime show on Talkradio.

=== Other work ===
Holmes writes a column for The People newspaper. His autobiography, This is MY Life, was published in May 2006. The title references broadcaster Eamonn Andrews, after whom he was named. The book includes accounts of his time at GMTV.

== Public image ==
In November 2009, Jon Culshaw portrayed Holmes in a series of sketches on The Impressions Show, depicting him with an exaggerated appetite. Although Holmes had interviewed Culshaw and co-star Debra Stephenson on This Morning to promote the programme, he later instructed his lawyers to send a complaint to the BBC. The corporation issued an apology and said that no further sketches featuring Holmes would be broadcast. The complaint and its outcome attracted unfavourable comment from some media writers and online observers.

In October 2011, while presenting This Morning, Holmes used the word "retarded" in reference to singer Jonathan Wilkes. He apologised on air following complaints from viewers.

Later that month, Holmes was criticised for remarks made during an interview in which he suggested that a rape victim might consider using taxis in future. ITV stated that his comments were intended as general safety advice and were not intended to imply blame.

In 2020, during the COVID-19 pandemic, Holmes drew criticism after comments on This Morning in which he questioned the dismissal of conspiracy theories linking 5G telecommunications to the virus.

== Personal life ==
In 1987, Holmes married Gabrielle Doherty. They have two sons and a daughter. The couple separated in 1996, a period Holmes later described as being affected by the demands of his work and the death of his father.

On 26 June 2010, Holmes married Ruth Langsford at Elvetham Hall in Hartley Wintney, Hampshire. They have one son. The couple sold exclusive rights to cover the wedding to Hello! magazine, which featured the event across two issues in July 2010. They lived at Burwood Park, a private housing estate in Hersham, Surrey. In May 2024, Holmes and Langsford announced that they were to divorce after 14 years of marriage, after which Holmes moved out of the marital home.

Holmes received an honorary degree from Queen's University Belfast in 2006 for services to broadcasting, and later received a further honorary degree from Staffordshire University.

Holmes supports Manchester United F.C., and delivered one of the eulogies at the funeral of George Best in December 2005.

Holmes and Langsford have been patrons of Dogs Trust, and adopted their dog, Maggie, from the charity in 2011. In 2014, they supported the Dementia Friends initiative run by the Alzheimer's Society.

In April 2015, Holmes became a celebrity ambassador for Variety, the Children's Charity. In January 2016, he became a patron of the Northern Ireland Kidney Patients' Association.

=== Health ===
In October 2022, Holmes suffered a fall at home, resulting in a fractured shoulder. He took several months away from his presenting duties on GB News while recovering.

In 2024, Holmes discussed a number of ongoing health issues, including a double hip replacement in 2016, spinal surgery in September 2022, and chronic back pain that had left him using a wheelchair.

In April 2026, Holmes was admitted to hospital after experiencing a stroke. GB News said he was recovering and requested privacy while he underwent treatment.

== Filmography ==
Television

| Year | Show | Role | Channel | Notes |
|---|---|---|---|---|
| 1986–1989 | Open Air | Presenter | BBC One | Series 1–3 |
| 1993–2005 | GMTV | Co-presenter | ITV | |
| 1995–1997 | How Do They Do That? | Co-presenter | BBC One | Series 3 - 5 |
| 2001–2007 | Jet Set | Presenter | BBC One | 8 series |
| 2003 | TV Scrabble | Presenter | Challenge TV | |
| 2004 | Would You Pass The 11+ | Co-presenter | BBC Northern Ireland | 1 episode; with Christine Bleakley |
| 2005 | Ant & Dec's Gameshow Marathon | Contestant | ITV | Series 1 |
| 2005 | The Sunday Night Project | Guest presenter | Channel 4 | 1 episode |
| 2005–2007 | SUDO-Q | Presenter | BBC One/BBC Two | 4 series |
| 2005–2016 | Sunrise | Main anchor | Sky News | Breakfast news programme |
| 2006 | The Rich List | Presenter | Fox | American game show |
| 2006–2021 | This Morning | Co-presenter | ITV | School holidays; with Ruth Langsford |
| 2009 | The Feelgood Factor | Co-presenter | ITV | 1 series; with Myleene Klass |
| 2009–2014 | Songs of Praise | Presenter | BBC One | 8 episodes |
| 2010 | Have I Got News for You | Guest presenter | BBC One | 1 episode |
| 2013 | Blue Peter – You Decide | Judge | CBBC | 5 episodes |
| 2014 | Gift Wrapped | Co-presenter | ITV | 1 series; with Ruth Langsford |
| 2014–2018 | Big Brother's Bit on the Side | Regular panellist | Channel 5 | 24 episodes |
| 2015–2019 | Eamonn & Ruth: How the Other Half Lives | Co-presenter | Channel 5 | 3 series; with Ruth Langsford |
| 2016 | It's Not Me, It's You | Presenter | Channel 5 | 1 series |
| 2017 | Eamonn & Ruth's 7 Year Itch | Co-presenter | Channel 5 | Two-part documentary; with Ruth Langsford |
| 2017–2018 | Good Morning Britain | Guest presenter | ITV | 14 episodes |
| 2017– | Biggleton | Narrator | CBeebies | |
| 2018 | Love Island: The Reunion | Guest | ITV2 | 1 episode; with Ruth Langsford |
| 2018–2023 | Do The Right Thing with Eamonn and Ruth | Co-presenter | Channel 5 | 1 series; with Ruth Langsford |
| 2018–2023 | How To Get A Good Night's Sleep | Co-presenter | Channel 5 | 1 series; with Ruth Langsford |
| 2019 | Supermarket Sweep | Contestant | ITV2 | 1 episode; with Ruth Langsford |
| 2019–2023 | Celebrity Gogglebox | TV Watcher | Channel 4 | with Ruth Langsford |
| 2021-2023 | Farm to Feast: Best Menu Wins | Presenter | BBC One | Six-part series |
| 2022– | Breakfast with Eamonn and Isabel | Presenter | GB News | with Isabel Webster |

Film

| Year | Show | Role | Notes |
|---|---|---|---|
| 2005 | Robots | Bigmouth Executive & Forge (Re-dubbed voice) | |
| 2014 | Mrs. Brown's Boys D'Movie | RTÉ newsreader | Cameo role |
| 2014 | Mrs. Brown's Boys D'Movie | Lee | |
| 2019 | Wonder Park | Uncle Tony (Re-dubbed voice) | |

Radio

| Year | Title | Role | Notes |
|---|---|---|---|
| 2003–2009 | The Eamonn Holmes Show | Presenter | Sports show on BBC Radio 5 Live |
| 2005–?? | Sunday Afternoons | Presenter | Sundays, 4 – 7 pm on Magic FM |
| 2008 | The Michael Parkinson Show | Guest presenter | BBC Radio 2 show |
| 2016 | Let's Talk with Eamonn Holmes | Presenter | Sundays, 11 am – 1 pm on Talkradio |
| 2018–2020 | Drivetime with Eamonn Holmes | Presenter | Weekdays, 4 – 7 pm on Talkradio |

== Awards and honours ==
Holmes was appointed Officer of the Order of the British Empire (OBE) for services to broadcasting in the 2018 New Year Honours. He collected his OBE from Queen Elizabeth II on 1 June 2018.

| Year | Group | Award | Result |
|---|---|---|---|
| 2008, 2009, 2010, 2011 | TRIC Awards | Satellite/Digital TV Personality | Won |
| 2013 | TRIC Awards | News Presenter/Reporter | Won |
| 2013 | Legends of Industry Award | Services to Broadcasting and Journalism | Won |
| 2016 | TRIC Awards | News Presenter/Reporter | Nominated |
| 2018, 2022 | TRIC Awards | News Presenter | Won |
