= Bathstore =

Specialist bathroom retailer in the United Kingdom

- Founded: 1990
- Founder: Nico de Beer and Patrick Riley
- Defunct: 2024
- Owner: CDS Superstores
- Website: www.bathstore.com (re-directs to homebase.co.uk)

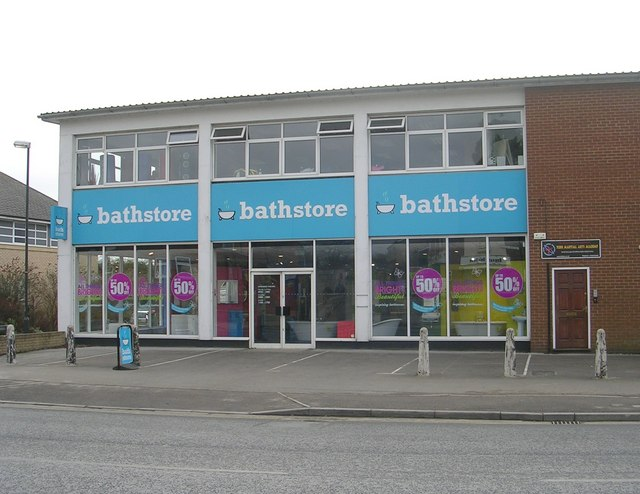
An example of a standalone Bathstore showroom in York, pictured in March 2010.

Bathstore was a British specialist bathroom retailer which was founded in 1990 by Nico de Beer and Patrick Riley in Croydon, South London. Bathstore expanded nationally, reaching 168 showrooms by the mid-2010s.

In July 2019, Homebase rescued Bathstore’s intellectual property and 44 of the showrooms from administration. The final standalone Bathstore showroom would close in March 2022, as Homebase had focused on incorporating Bathstore showrooms inside its main store portfolio. In November 2024, Homebase itself entered administration. CDS Superstores (trading as The Range) rescued both the Homebase and Bathstore intellectual properties, selling Bathstore items through their re-launched Homebase.co.uk and some The Range stores.

== History ==
Bathstore was established in 1990 by Patrick Riley and Nico de Beer, with the idea to bring quality design-led bathrooms to more customers. The company published one catalogue that contained all its products for the complete bathroom, with retail prices. The ethos was to focus on the homeowner, rather than the trade buyer.

In June 2003, the company was acquired for an undisclosed sum by Wolseley, a distributor of plumbing supplies and building materials.

Bathstore launched its first television advertising campaign in December 2006. In November 2007, its television advertisements used CGI technology for the first time, incorporating water animation to bring life and movement to the products being showcased. These advertisements were voiced by the star from Spooks and Cold Feet, Hermione Norris.

The company was nominated and shortlisted for the Retail Week Awards as Best Specialist Retailer in 2007 and 2008.

A period of rapid expansion and brand development under the leadership of executive chairman Nick Nearchou established the business as a speciality bathroom retailer, with more than 150 showrooms in the United Kingdom by the end of 2007. In 2009, the warehousing and delivery operation was transferred to DHL Supply Chain, at their facility at the Daventry International Railfreight Terminal near Crick.

In May 2012, Wolseley sold Bathstore to the turnaround specialist Endless LLP for £15 million cash, in order to focus on core wholesale businesses. At that time there were over 160 stores.

In June 2014, Endless sold Bathstore in a management buyout led by chief executive Gary Favell, backed by American private finance. The price was not disclosed, although The Telegraph reported that Endless had made a five-fold return on its investment.

In April 2017, the company branched out into kitchens and bedrooms: they opened two new Haus Stores in Farnborough and Lakeside, having acquired two former Betta Living premises.

=== Post-administration ===
On 26 June 2019, Bathstore went into administration. At the time, it had 135 stores in the United Kingdom, employing over five hundred. In the following month, its brand was purchased by Homebase to be used for in-store concessions and online trading. Homebase also purchased 44 original Bathstore showrooms. Homebase operated the showrooms for a while, closing most of them in 2021, with the final one in Guildford closing in March 2022.

In November 2024, Homebase itself was placed into administration. On 6 December 2024, it was reported that the Bathstore intellectual property was owned outside of the Homebase group, and that CDS Superstores had consideration with the administrators for acquiring it. The Bathstore intellectual property was acquired by CDS Superstores in April 2025.
