= James Kemsey Wilkinson =

English businessman (1906–1997)

- Born: 6 December 1906; Handsworth, Staffordshire, England
- Died: 18 December 1997 (aged 91); Leicester, Leicestershire, England
- Occupation: Businessman
- Years active: 1930–1997
- Known for: Founder of retailer Wilko
- Spouse: Mary Cooper (m. 1934)
- Children: Tony Wilkinson

James Kemsey "JK" Wilkinson (6 December 1906 – 18 December 1997) was an English businessman, the founder of the high street chain Wilko. In 2014, it was reported that Wilko had 372 stores, 23,000 employees and annual revenues of £1.5 billion. Wilko collapsed into administration, on 10 August 2023.

== Early life ==
James Kemsey Wilkinson was born on 6 December 1906.

== Career ==
Together with his then fiancée, Mary Cooper, he founded Wilkinson Cash Stores Limited in Leicester during 1930, opening their first store there at 151 Charnwood Street. His brother Donald already had a hardware store in Birmingham, and two of his stores in Handsworth later joined the chain.

In 1932, they opened their second store, in Wigston.

In 1937, his brother John joined as a director.

He ceased to be a director of Wilko on 18 December 1997 when he died.

== Personal life and death ==
He married Mary Cooper on 22 October 1934 at St Peter's, Highfields, Leicester.

Their son, Tony Wilkinson was born in 1937.

Wilkinson died on 18 December 1997, aged 91.

Business positions
Preceded by Founded	Chair of Wilko; 1930–1997	Succeeded by Tony Wilkinson
Preceded by Founded	Owner of Wilko; 1930–1997	Succeeded by Tony Wilkinson
