= Wilko =

British retail chain

Wilko.com Limited
- Logo used since 2008
- Type: Limited company Subsidiary
- Industry: Retail
- Founded: 1930; 96 years ago
- Founder: James Kemsey Wilkinson; Mary Cooper
- Headquarters: Plymouth, United Kingdom
- Number of locations: 7
- Key people: Chris Dawson
- Products: Groceries; Consumer goods; Garden and leisure; Pet supplies; Stationery; Toiletries; DIY
- Owner: CDS Superstores
- Website: www.wilko.com

Wilko.com Limited (trading as Wilko) is a British variety retailer. It was founded as Wilkinson by James Kemsey Wilkinson and Mary Cooper in 1930 as a hardware retailer, opening its first store in Leicester.

In 1972, Tony Wilkinson succeeded his father as chairman, leading the retailer through rapid expansion. By the end of the 1980s, the chain had 78 stores, and by the end of the 1990s, it had grown to 152 stores. In June 2005, Lisa Wilkinson and Karin Swann succeeded their father and uncle, refocusing the stores from hardware to variety retail, and from 2012 onwards, rebranded the chain to Wilko.

In August 2023, Wilko Limited collapsed into administration, with the final stores closing on 8 October. In September, CDS Superstores purchased the Wilko intellectual property, re-launching Wilko.com on 12 October, and opening new physical stores from December 2023 onwards.

== History ==
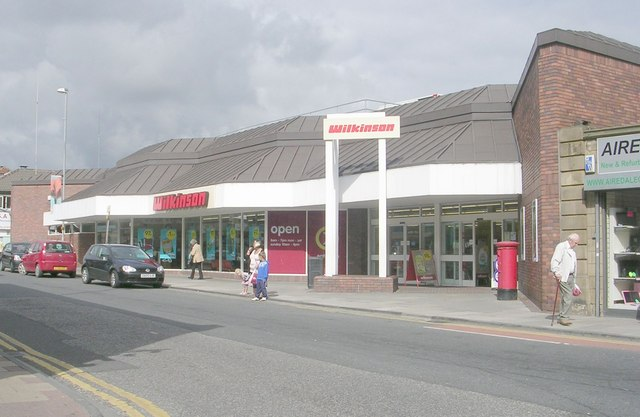
A branch in Castleford in 'Wilkinson' branding in 2010

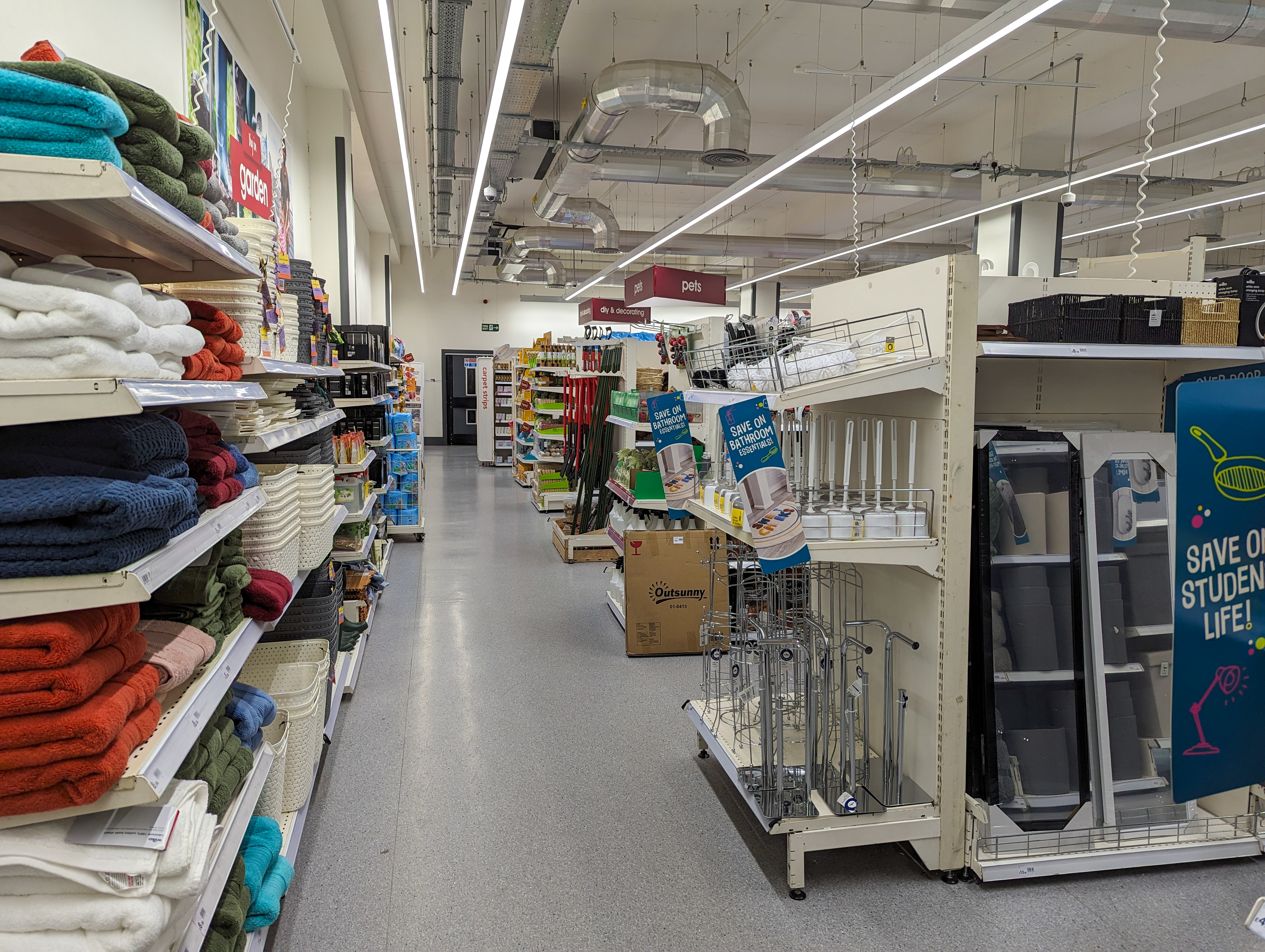
Interior of a Wilko branch in Leamington Spa, Warwickshire.

The first Wilkinson store was opened by James Kemsey Wilkinson and his fiancee Mary Cooper at 151 Charnwood Street, Leicester in 1930, and a second store was opened in Wigston Magna, near Leicester, in 1932. Nine branches were opened by 1939.

The Beaconsfield store can be seen in the background of a scene in the film Brief Encounter (1945). By the end of the 1980s, the chain had 78 stores, increasing to over 152 by the end of the 1990s.

The founder's son, Tony Wilkinson, joined the company as a branch manager in 1960 and succeeded his father as chairman in 1972, retiring in June 2005. Tony was succeeded by his daughter, Lisa Wilkinson, and his niece, Karin Swann.

Wilkinson opened its first Scottish outlet in Castle Douglas in January 2009.

In 2012, Wilkinson began rebranding its stores as Wilko, after its own brand products already marketed under the Wilko name, and by 2014, most stores had been rebranded. Prior to the rebranding, the abbreviation Wilko had been commonly used as an informal reference to the brand.

In 2014, Karin Swann sold her 50% holding in the business to Lisa, leaving Tony, his wife Christine and Lisa the sole owners of the company, and Lisa the chairman. Swann wanted to pursue other business interests and the decision did not represent a falling-out of the family.

In August 2017, Wilko began negotiations with the GMB trade union over the company's plan to cut 4,000 jobs. The board paid the family owners a £3 million dividend.

In March 2018, Wilko began to sell 285 of its own brand products in Dubai through Ace Hardware, marking the first time that Wilko had sold through another retailer.

In June 2020, Warpaint London, a cosmetics company, signed a deal with Wilko to sell their products in UK shops.

In January 2022, Wilko announced the closure of 15 stores with costly long leases. Wilko paid its owners, led by the Wilkinson family, a £3 million dividend again.

=== Administration and closure ===
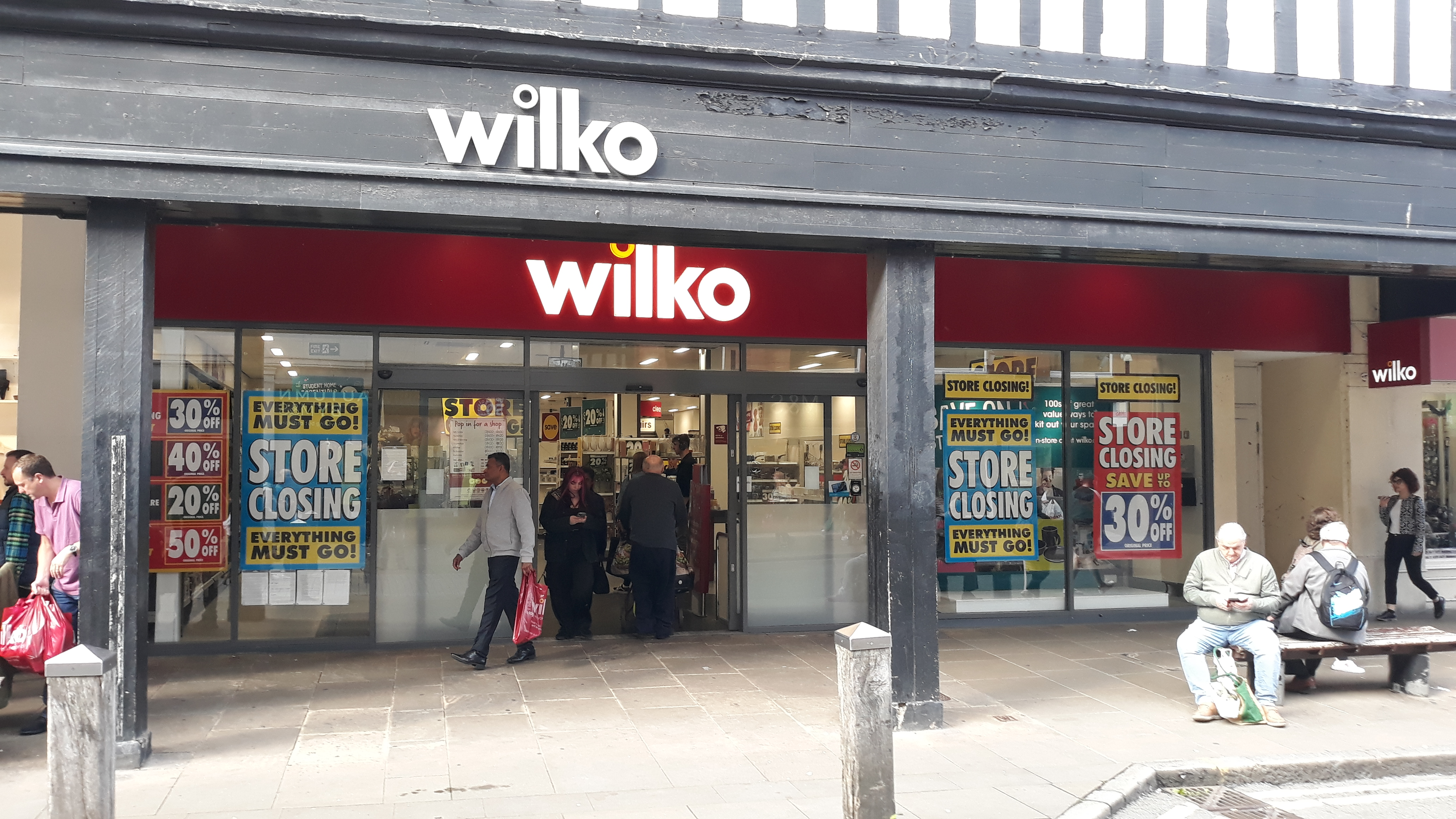
Administration sale, Chester, September 2023

In January 2023, Wilko confirmed it had borrowed £40 million from the restructuring firm Hilco Capital. It followed this in February with plans to cut up to 400 jobs.

On 3 August 2023, Wilko announced its intention to appoint administrators as it was seeking a buyer following a period of difficult trading conditions. The company entered administration on 10 August. CEO Mark Jackson said management would work with administrators PwC to "preserve as many jobs as possible". A deadline for offers to acquire the business was set for 16 August 2023.

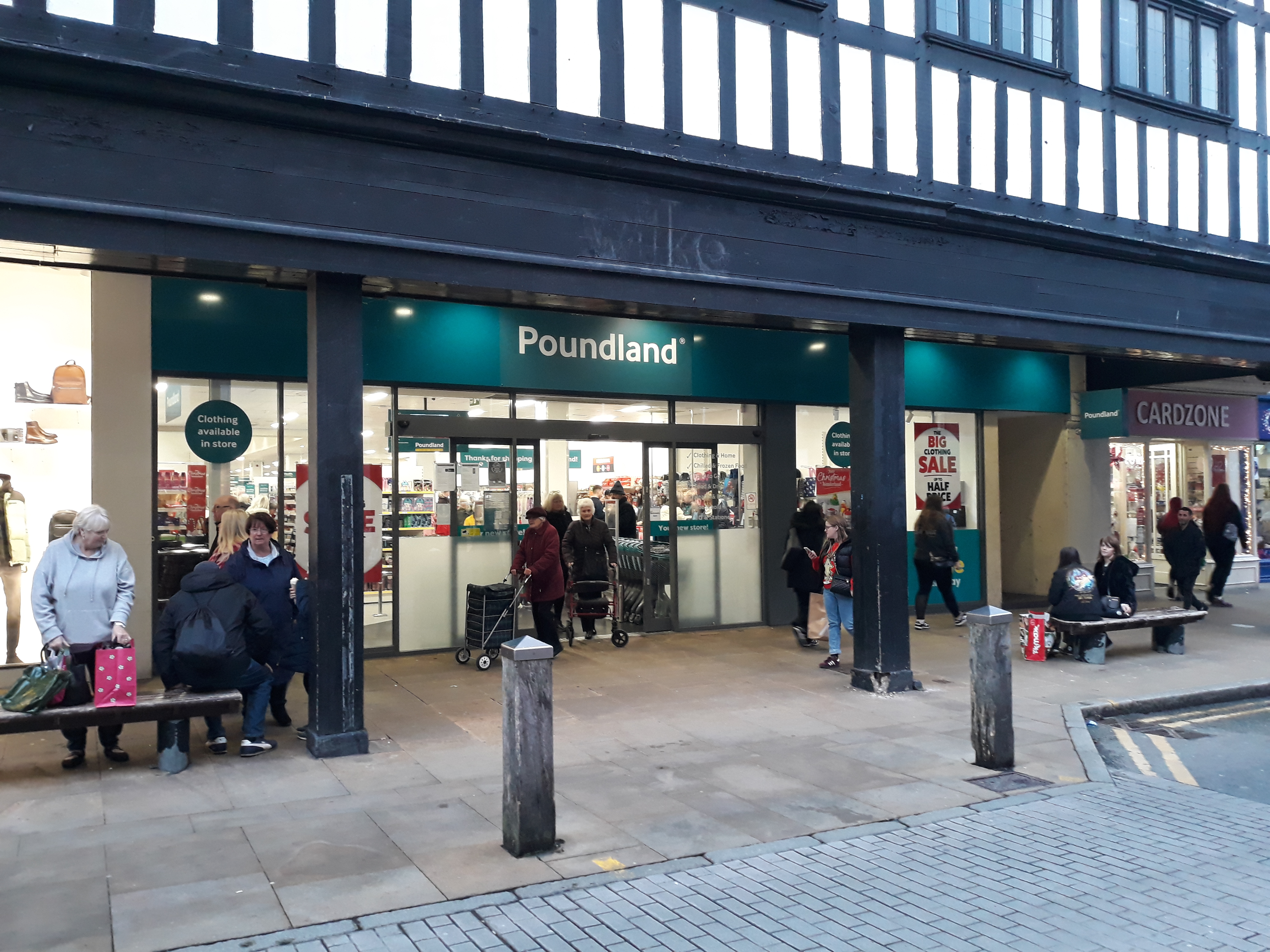
The former Wilko store in Chester reopened as a branch of Poundland. Outline of the old Wilko sign remains visible on the wooden fascia. December 2023

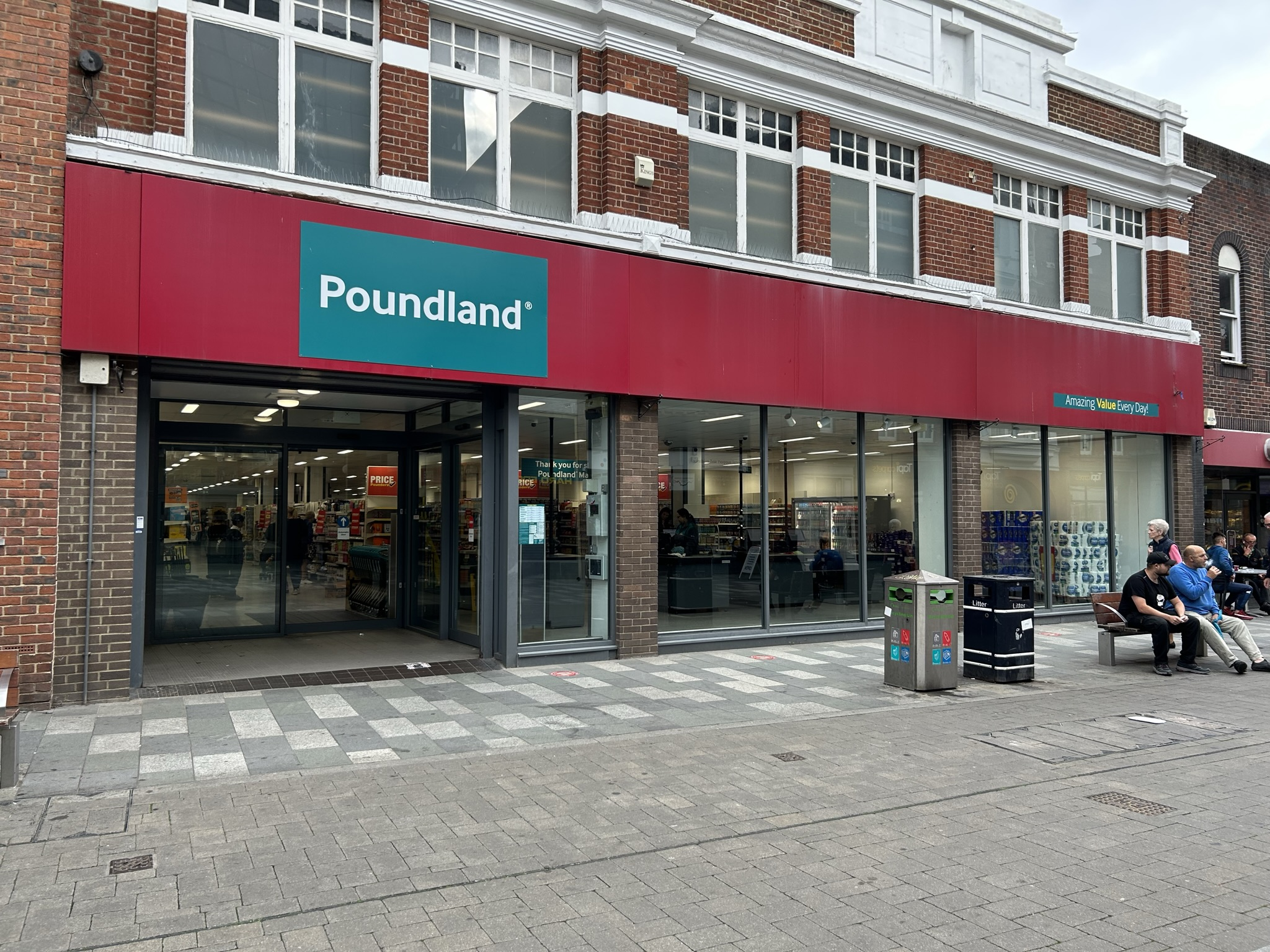
A Wilko branch in Maidenhead, Berkshire in the process of reopening and rebranding as a branch of Poundland in October 2023

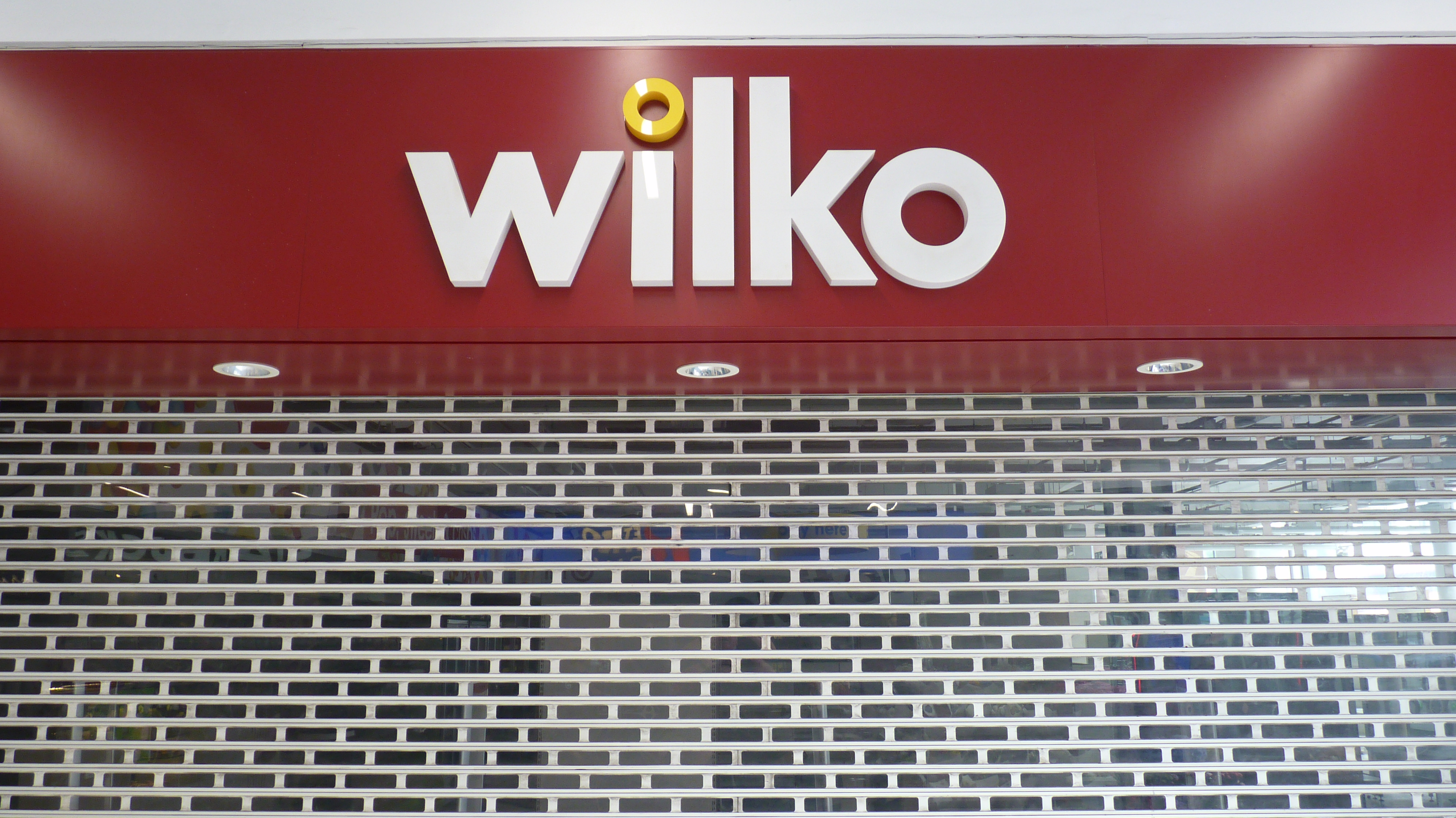
A Wilko branch that closed its doors for the last time in late 2023

Wilko collapsed with the loss of over 12,000 jobs, £625 million in debt and a £50 million pension deficit. During the administration process, it was reported that its owners had taken £77 million out of the company in the preceding decade.

In September 2023, B&M bought 51 Wilko stores for £13 million. An attempt by Canadian businessman Doug Putman to acquire 100 Wilko stores, slimmed down from a deal to acquire 300 stores, collapsed in the same month. Poundland acquired 71 Wilko stores and stated it would prioritise the recruitment of former Wilko staff. CDS Superstores (The Range) acquired the Wilko brand, website and intellectual property for £5 million. 36 workers from Wilko's digital team transferred over to CDS' digital team as part of the deal. The final stores under the previous ownership closed on 8 October 2023.

=== Post-administration ===
The Wilko website was relaunched by CDS Superstores on 12 October 2023 and resumed home delivery. The Range started stocking Wilko brand products in its stores from 27 October 2023. Three stores in Plymouth, Exeter, and Luton re-opened in December 2023. Two stores in Rotherham and St Albans re-opened in March 2024. Wilko's store in Poole re-opened in August 2024. The Wilko store in Uxbridge in London re-opened in November 2024.

In February 2025, CDS Superstores announced it would temporarily pause the opening of new Wilko stores to focus on converting 49 Homebase stores to The Range.

In March 2026, CDS Superstores reached an agreement with Morrisons to incorpate Wilko concessions into their stores.

== Distribution ==
The company awarded a five-year logistics contract to Wincanton plc in March 2017, replacing Canute Haulage Group after 29 years.

In September 2019, the GMB union announced that its members would strike over a new weekend working proposal at the distribution centres. The strikes planned for four dates in October 2019 were called off after an improved offer was made by Wilko.

Following the departure of Wilko, Canute Haulage Group entered administration in 2018 and was liquidated in 2019.

== Financial performance ==
Turnover for the year ending February 2022 was in excess of £1.2 billion.

Financial statistics (in £ thousands)
Year ending	Turnover	Operating profit/(loss)	Profit/(loss)
February 2023	Under £1 billion	(under 30,000)	(under 30,000)
February 2022	1,241,242	(37,572)	(31,903)
February 2021	1,283,251	5,063	4,481
February 2020	1,428,491	2,069	3,752
February 2019	1,508,690	(2,438)	13,926
February 2018	1,619,147	8,227	(52,878)
February 2017	1,517,763	17,994	16,046
February 2016	1,464,475	23,638	15,910
