= Edmundson Electrical =

Electrical distribution company based in Knutsford, Cheshire

Edmundson Electrical Ltd
- Type: Private
- Industry: Electrical supplies
- Headquarters: Knutsford, Cheshire, United Kingdom
- Area served: United Kingdom; Ireland
- Key people: D. T. McNair
- Revenue: £1,306.6 million (2019)
- Operating income: £63.5 million (2019)
- Owner: Marlow Holdings Ltd (Nicholas George Spencer-Jones)
- Parent: Marlow Holdings Ltd
- Divisions: Electric Center; Lockwell Electrical Distributors; UK Greentech

Edmundson Electrical Ltd is a privately held electrical distribution company headquartered in Knutsford, Cheshire, incorporated in 1991. It is the largest electrical distributor in the United Kingdom and serves both to the trade and to the public from over 300 locations. The company also serves Ireland through a subsidiary, EWL Electric Ltd, as well as through mainland Europe via its sister company, Vink Holdings.

Edmundson also has significant presence in the Middle East through its associate company, Sentor Electrical, which operates in Dubai, Abu Dhabi, Qatar, Ajman and agents in Kuwait, Bahrain and Oman.

Through a number of holding and investment companies, it is directly controlled by the Delaware registered Blackfriars Corporation (now Marshire Holdings Corporation), controlled in turn by the Colburn family as part of their global electrical and prefabricated plastics organisation. The company also holds a royal warrant.

The company also delves into solar and renewable Energy via its UK Greentech branches. As of 2025 there are 20 branches operating within the UK and Republic of Ireland.

== History ==
The company was founded in 1801 by Joshua Edmundson, and developed into one of the first suppliers of electricity to being a major distributor of electrical equipment. The Edmundsons Electricity Corporation was founded in 1897 and was a major holding company which controlled and owned many electricity suppliers in England and Wales in the first half of the twentieth century.

The company serves the United Kingdom through more than 320 branches, supplying a range of electrical items.

Acquisitions have accelerated the company's growth. The largest of these came in 2011, when the company acquired Electric Center from Wolseley plc for £40.6m. This added a further 90 branches to the existing Edmundson network of 250 branches, giving it significant control over the market. The deal was cleared by the Office of Fair Trading in 2012 after the company agreed to sell a number of branches to Abbey Cross Trading Ltd.

Prior to being acquired, Electric Center achieved sales of £130m earning profits of £1.5m. The company has also expanded through several smaller acquisitions, including Cable Management Centre (2008), Western Electrical for £3.2m (2014), and Lockwell Electrical £8.8m (2015) as well as Bennett & Fountain, Walsall, GA Nicholas and Specialist Lamp Distributors.

According to a filing with Companies House, in October 2016, Marlow Investments Ltd changed the name to Plumbing And Heating Investments Ltd. In the end of 2016, the company acquired East Anglia's leading plumbing wholesaler, Plumbcity Ltd parent of Gallery Bathrooms Ltd, Plumbclick Ltd and Plumbclick.co.uk Ltd.

In the financial year of 2015, Plumbcity recorded revenues of £26 million. In the same month the company acquired the leading plumbers merchant in the South of England, Heating Plumbing Supplies Group Ltd and its subsidiary Heating Plumbing Supplies Ltd. The transaction significantly expanded the groups influence, with over 30 branches gained and revenue of more than £53 million in 2015, and adding to the pre existing presence through the East Midlands-based merchant, G.B Willbond Limited.

During the 2016 financial year the group acquired Cheshire Electrical Supplies Ltd, Novoplast Kunstoffen, Deutsche ADP and Oak Electrical Ltd for a combined total of £83.8 million.

During the 2017 financial year the business acquired Acrylics Deutschland GmbH, Adhe-Rhone, Plumbstop Ltd and Schreine Kunstoffen BV for aggregated consideration of £14.8 million.

During 2018, the business acquired B&S Kunstoffverarbeitung, Access Plastics Ltd, Access Plastics Manufacturing Ltd, Plumbstore (Plumbing + Heating) Ltd, Trans European Plastics Ltd and UK Plumbing Supplies Ltd for £11.1 million.

In January 2019, the company acquired Proplastik OU, Proplastic SIA and Proplastic UAB. In May, the business acquired Milbrook Distribution and Spares Ltd. In late August, the company acquired T.S. Industrial Products Ltd. On October 1, the company acquired Plumbase Ltd and at the end of October the business acquired Bathroom Centre Ltd, Gas Centre Holdings Ltd and Gas Centre Ltd. These acquisitions totalled £63.3 million in consideration.

=== Financial information ===
For the year ending December 2019, total group revenue of the Parent company was £2.2 billion.

Year	2019	2018	2017	2016	2015	2014	2013	2012	2011	2010
Revenue (in millions £)	1306.6	1263.2	1263.9	1235.6	1268.4	1159.1	1093.4	1116.7	1023.0	851.7
Operating Profit (in millions £)	63.5	63.5	62.4	59.9	71.5	65.3	56.9	63.8	55.8	54.0
As a % of revenue	4.9	5.0	4.9	4.7	5.9	5.6	5.2	5.7	5.5	6.3

=== Acquisitions ===
Illustration of the company's structure and ownership
- Marlowe Holdings Ltd
  - Marlowe Holdings Investments Ltd
    - Electrical components wholesale division
      - Edmundson Electrical Ltd (Acq 1979)
        - Electric Centre (Acq 2013)
          - AC Electrical (Merged 2006)
          - William Wilson (Merged 2006)
        - Sentor Electrical WLL
      - The British Central Electrical Company Ltd
      - Electrical And Radio Distributors Ltd
      - Specialist Instrument Services Ltd
      - Specialist Lamp Distributors Ltd
      - G A Nicholas Ltd
      - Bennett & Fountain Ltd
      - Lockwell Electrical Distributors Ltd
      - EWL Electric
        - GEC Ireland Ltd (Acq 1998)
        - Irwin Electrical (Acq 2005)
        - Eastern Electrical Ltd (Acq 2008)
      - Ryness Ltd (Acq 2011)
      - Tradesparky Ltd
      - Western Electrical Holding Ltd
        - Cornwall Electrical Wholesalers Ltd
        - Western Electrical Wholesale Ltd
        - Plymouth Electrical Wholesalers Ltd
        - Exeter Electrical Wholesalers Ltd
      - Eletricenter Ltd
        - Edmundson Distribution Ltd
      - Cheshire Electrical Supplies Ltd
    - Cables & Fasteners division
      - Cable Management Centre
      - Zylo Ltd
        - Hexstone Ltd
        - Icon Fasteners Ltd
        - Jaton Ltd
        - JCP Fixings Ltd
        - Owlett Jaton Ltd
        - Righton Fasteners Ltd
        - Stainless Threaded Fasteners Ltd
    - Plumbing, Heating & Gas division
      - G B Willbond Ltd (Acq 2016)
        - Fullrich Ltd
        - Spittal Tiles (Acq 2008)
      - Kippington Road Ltd
      - Plumbing And Heating Investments Ltd
        - Plumbcity Ltd
          - Gallery Bathrooms Ltd
          - Plumbclick Ltd
          - Plumbclick.co.uk Ltd
      - Heating Plumbing Supplies Group Ltd
        - Heating Plumbing Supplies Ltd
      - Plumbstop Ltd
      - Plumbstore (Plumbing + Heating) Ltd
      - UK Plumbing Supplies Ltd
        - Plumbase Ltd
      - Milbrook Distribution and Spares Ltd
      - T.S. Industrial Products Ltd
      - Bathroom Centre Ltd
      - Gas Centre Holdings Ltd
        - Gas Centre Ltd
    - Plastics distribution division
      - Vink Holdings Ltd
      - Novoplast Kunstoffen
      - Deutsche ADP
      - Acrylics Deutschland GmbH
      - Adhe-Rhone
      - Schreine Kunstoffen BV
      - B&S Kunstoffverarbeitung
      - Access Plastics Ltd
      - Access Plastics Manufacturing Ltd
      - Trans European Plastics Ltd
      - Proplastik OU
      - Proplastik SIA
      - Proplastik UAB
    - Knutsford Properties Ltd
    - Edmundson Export Ltd

== See also ==
- Wolseley plc
- Wolseley UK
- Lockwell Electrical
- Electric Center
- Power Wholesale
