= Ruth Langsford =

English television presenter (born 1960)

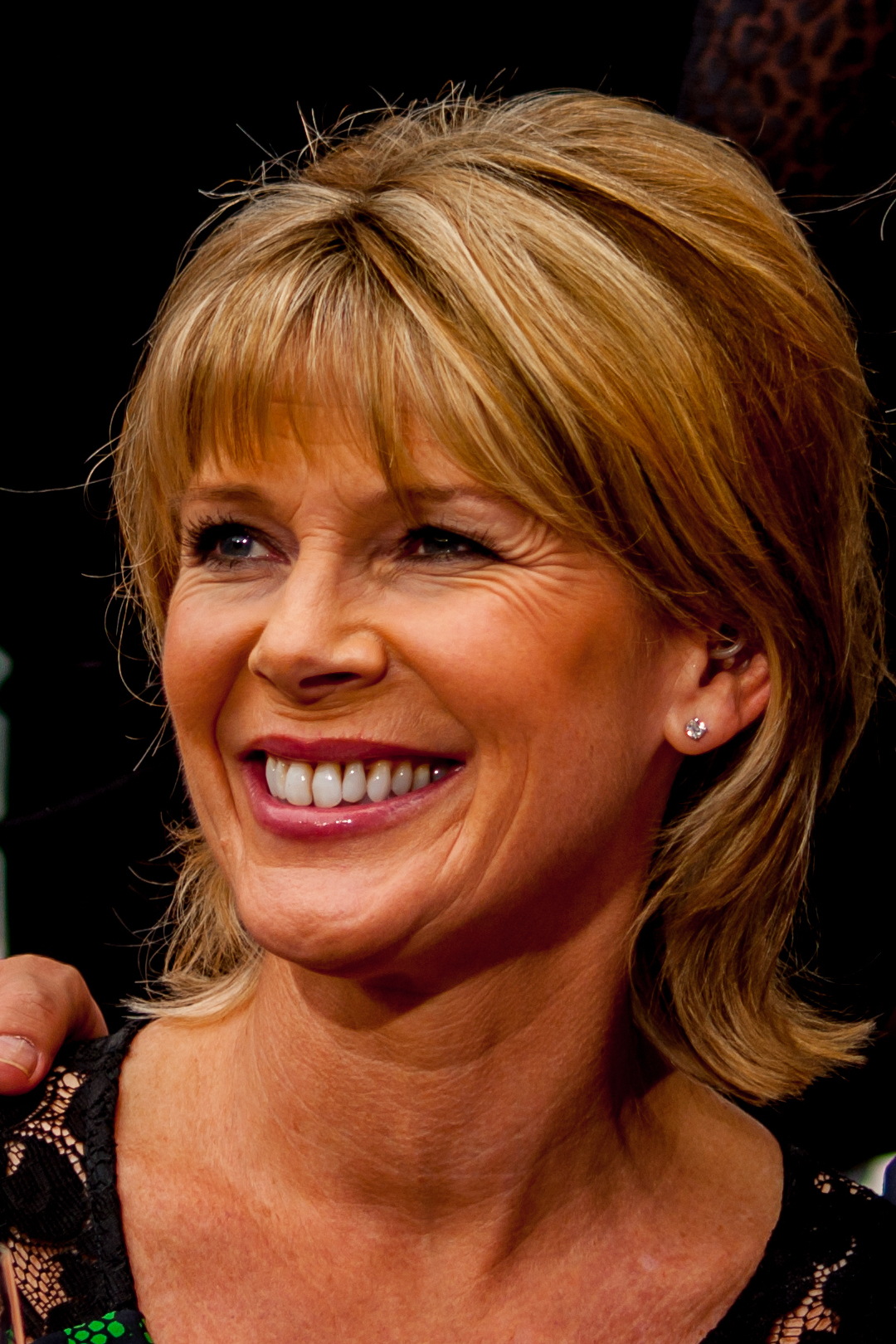
- Langsford in 2013
- Born: Ruth Wendy Langsford; 17 March 1960 (age 66); Singapore
- Occupation: Television presenter
- Years active: 1986–present
- Employer(s): ITV; Channel 5 QVC UK
- Spouse: Eamonn Holmes (m. 2010; sep. 2024)
- Children: 1

Ruth Wendy Langsford (born 17 March 1960) is an English television presenter. She has presented various television shows, including This Morning (1999–2022), of which she is the longest-serving presenter, Gift Wrapped (2014), How the Other Half Lives (2015–2019), and Ruth Langsford's Fashion Edit (2017–present). Since 1999, Langsford has been a regular panellist on the ITV talk show Loose Women, Langsford rejoined the programme in 2014 as a presenter. In 2017, she took part in the fifteenth series of Strictly Come Dancing, in which she finished in ninth place.

== Early life ==
Langsford was born in Singapore in 1960. She was educated at Grey Coat Hospital school in central London.

== Career ==
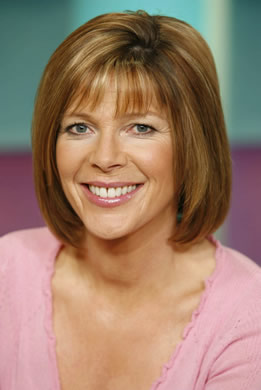
Langsford in 2009

=== Television ===
Langsford began her career as a continuity announcer and newscaster with ITV regional station Television South West (TSW) in Plymouth, England. She left TSW when Westcountry Television took over the franchise on 1 January 1993, closing down the station with fellow announcer Ian Stirling.

From 1999 until 2002, Langsford was a regular panellist on ITV's daytime chat show Loose Women. In 2010, she returned to the show as a stand-in anchor until 2013. Langsford rejoined Loose Women on 8 January 2014 as a regular anchor. She currently anchors the show in rotation with Jane Moore, Charlene White, Christine Lampard and Kaye Adams.

In 2000, Langsford became a guest presenter on This Morning, and was made a regular presenter in 2006 where she co-hosted alongside Phillip Schofield, making her the longest serving presenter of the programme. Later that year, the show introduced Eamonn Holmes to co-host with Langsford every Friday.

Langsford was one of the main presenters on the now defunct TV Travel Shop which was on air from April 1998 until March 2005. She also hosted The Answer Lies in the Soil (1999), The Great British Garden Show, Langsford Late (1999), The Really Useful Show (1997), Mysterious West (1995) and Gardens of the Millennium (1999).

In 2004, Langsford narrated the television series Zoo Story set at Paignton Zoo. She guest presented five episodes of GMTV with Lorraine in 2010. Langsford was a contestant on Marco's Kitchen Burnout in 2010 and competed in Born to Shine in 2011.

In 2014, Langsford and Eamonn Holmes co-hosted ten episodes of the ITV teatime quiz show Gift Wrapped.

Since 2015, Langsford and Holmes have presented Channel 5 series How the Other Half Lives, and a third in 2017.

In February 2017, Langsford began co-presenting Ruth Langsford's Fashion Edit alongside Jackie Kabler for QVC.

On 9 August 2017, Langsford was the third celebrity announced to be taking part in the fifteenth series of Strictly Come Dancing. Her professional partner was Anton du Beke. She was the seventh celebrity to be eliminated, and left the show on 12 November.

From March 2018, Langsford co-presented Do the Right Thing with Eamonn Holmes on Channel 5.

In 2019 and again in 2020, Langsford co-presented the Channel 5 dieting series Lose a Stone in Four Weeks for Summer, alongside GP Amir Khan.

=== Other work ===
In September 2010, Langsford co-hosted the breakfast show on BBC London 94.9 alongside Paul Ross.

In 2011, Langsford became the brand ambassador for Playtex.

In 2013, Langsford became brand ambassador for Clarivu refractive lens exchange procedure sold by Optegra.

Langsford has written columns for Woman magazine and the Tesco magazine. She was an ambassador for two Tesco food campaigns.

She was on the judging panel for the Pride of Britain Awards in 2016.

== Personal life ==
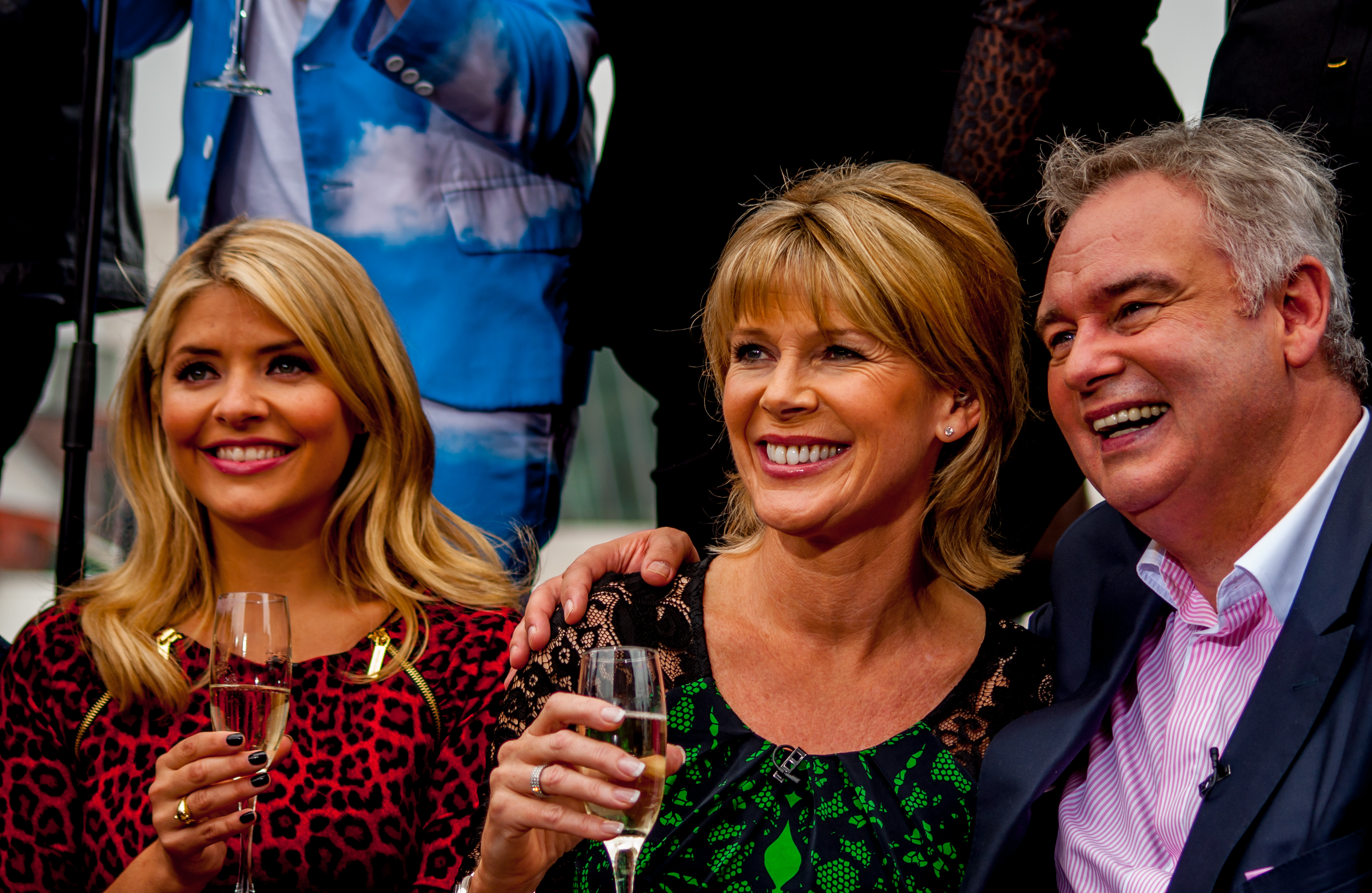
Langsford (centre) in 2013 with her later estranged husband Eamonn Holmes (right) and Holly Willoughby (left)

In 1996, Langsford began dating Eamonn Holmes, though the two kept their relationship secret for years out of respect for Holmes' first wife, Gabrielle, from whom he was separated at the time. On 26 February 2002, Langsford gave birth to their son. They married at Elvetham Hall in Hartley Wintney, Hampshire on 26 June 2010. The couple lived at Burwood Park, a private housing estate in Hersham, Surrey. In May 2024, Langsford and Holmes announced their plans to divorce after 14 years of marriage, after which Holmes moved out of the family home.

== Filmography ==
=== Television ===
Year	Title	Role	Notes
1993–1994	The West at Work	Presenter	
1994	Ruth Meets the Entertainers	Presenter	
1995–1997	Mysterious West	Presenter	
1997	The Really Useful Show	Presenter	
1999	The Answer Lies in the Soil	Presenter	
1999	Gardens of the Millennium	Presenter	
1999	Langsford Late	Presenter	
1999–2002, 2009–2010, 2012–present	Loose Women	Panellist/anchor	Regular panellist (1999–2000, 2002) Guest presenter (2006, 2007) Guest panellist (2019)
1999–2022	This Morning	Co-presenter	Fridays & Holidays
2001	Taste of the West	Presenter	
2004	Zoo Story	Narrator	
2010	GMTV with Lorraine	Guest presenter	
2010	Marco's Kitchen Burnout	Contestant	
2011	Born to Shine	Contestant	
2014	Gift Wrapped	Co-presenter	Daytime quiz
2015–2019	Eamonn & Ruth: How The Other Half Lives	Co-presenter	5 series
2017–present	Ruth Langsford's Fashion Edit	Co-presenter	Live fashion show
2017	Strictly Come Dancing	Contestant	
2017	Eamonn & Ruth's 7 Year Itch	Co-presenter	
2018–2019	Do The Right Thing with Eamonn and Ruth	Co-presenter	2 series
2018	How To Get A Good Night’s Sleep	Co-presenter	One-off special
2019	Wonder Park	Aunt Albertine	UK version
2019	Supermarket Sweep	Contestant	1 episode; with Eamonn Holmes
2019–2020	Lose a Stone in 4 Weeks	Presenter	Three-part series

== See also ==
- List of Strictly Come Dancing contestants
