= The Range (retailer) =

British variety store and garden centre retailer

CDS (Superstores International) Limited

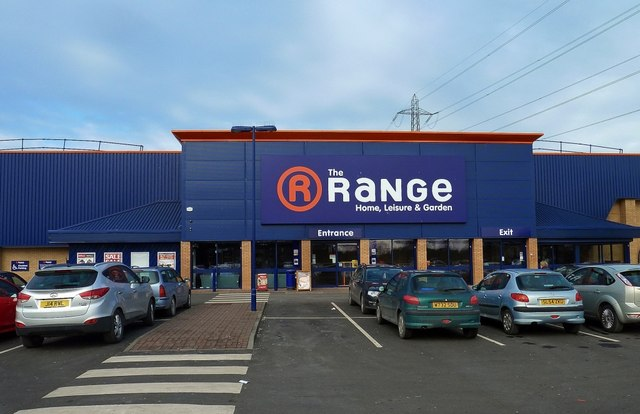
- A branch of The Range, located in Edinburgh.
- Trade name: The Range
- Industry: Retail
- Founded: 1989; 37 years ago
- Headquarters: Plymouth, United Kingdom
- Key people: Chris Dawson (Chairman); Alex Simpkin (CEO)
- Products: Home furnishings Pets & leisure Arts & crafts Paint & decor DIY; Kitchens; Gardening; Bathrooms
- Brands: Homebase; Bathstore; Texas Homecare (defunct)
- Owner: Norton Group Holdings
- Subsidiaries: Wilko
- Website: www.therange.co.uk

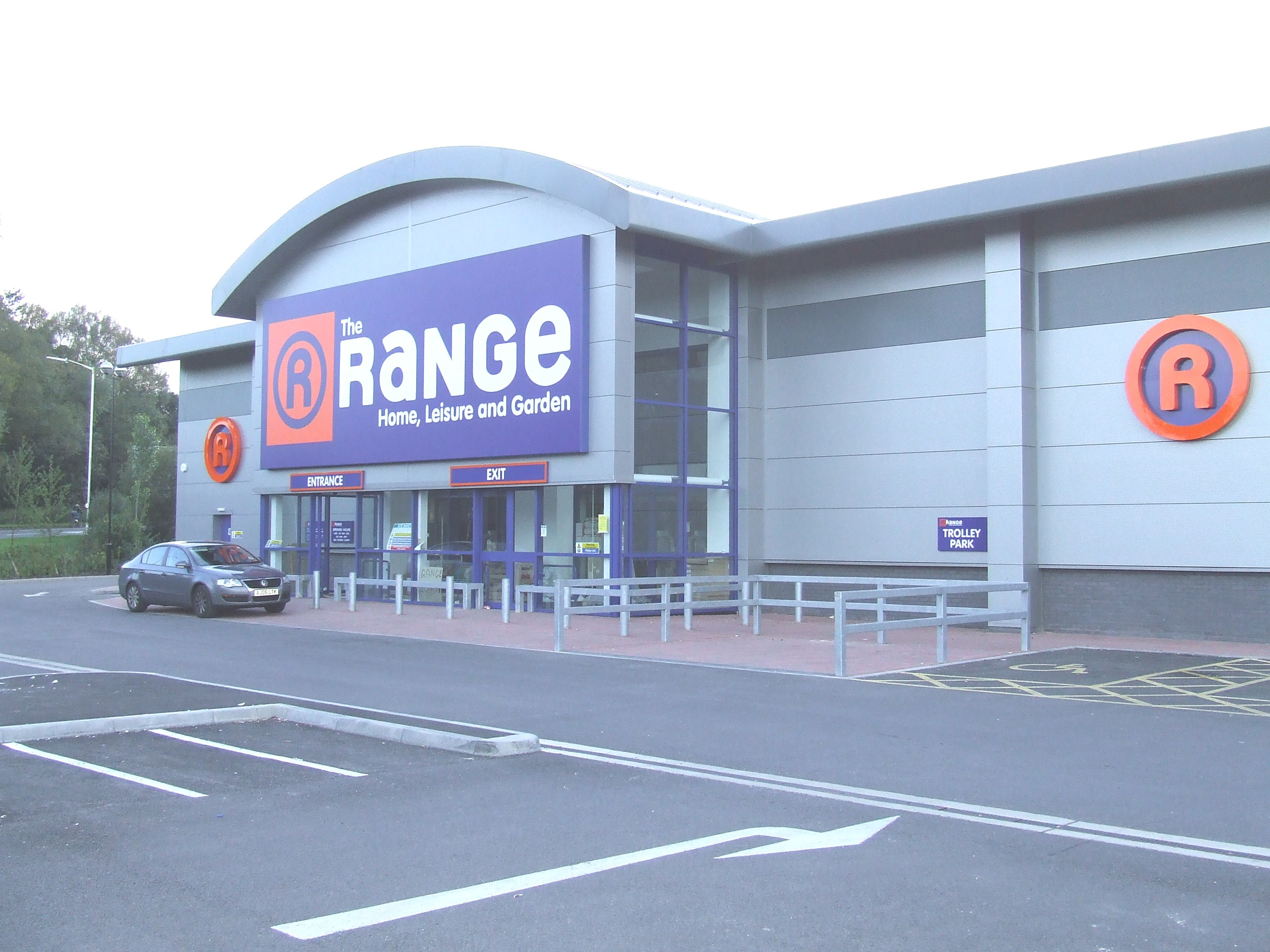
A branch of The Range, located in Andover.

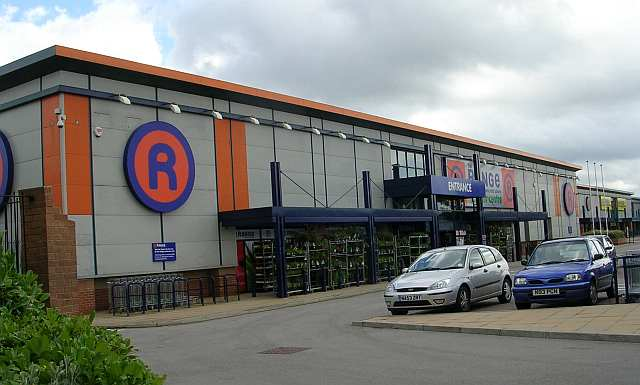
A branch of The Range, located in Leeds.

CDS (Superstores International) Limited, trading as The Range, is a British variety store and garden centre retailer, originally founded as Chris Dawson Superstores in 1989 as a single store in Plymouth.

In the 1990s, it became a chain and was rebranded to 'The Range', establishing a presence across the South West by the end of the decade. In the 2000s, it engaged in rapid nationwide expansion and became one of the UK's fastest growing retailers.

In September 2023, it acquired the Wilko brand and website from administration, and reopened select Wilko stores from December of that year. In November 2024, it acquired the Homebase brand and 49 of its stores from administration, rebranding these stores as 'The Range'. The company also refocused its existing garden centres and kitchen showrooms as Homebase-branded concessions, as well as acquiring the Bathstore brand and relaunching Homebase.co.uk.

== History ==
In 1966, Chris Dawson left school with no qualifications, and started business as an open-air market trader in Plymouth. In the early 1980s, he opened two cash and carry stores in Exeter and Newton Abbot, both of which he sold at the end of the decade as he took advantage of a property boom.

In 1989, Dawson opened Chris Dawson Superstores (shortened as C.D.S.) as a standalone variety retailer at the Sugar Mill Retail Park in Plymouth, as he was convinced he could operate a better model than Woolworths or Trago Mills. His venture provided a success, and he began opening more of these superstores.

In the early 1990s, Chris Dawson Superstores was subsequently rebranded to The Range.

Throughout the 2000s, The Range's store openings continued to accelerate, with the chain benefitting from the acquisition of stores and liquidated stock from the administrations of Focus DIY, T. J. Hughes, MFI, Woolworths, and Empire Direct.

In 2009, The Range was ranked 121st on The Sunday Times, PricewaterhouseCoopers Top Track, and 250 League Table of the United Kingdom's fastest growing companies.

In October 2012, the retailer opened a new distribution centre in Thorne, Doncaster.

In November 2013, it was announced that The Range planned to open 40 stores in the period of 2013 to 2016.

In September 2014, Compass Group were awarded a £60 million contract to open "Dee Dee's" coffee shop concessions in The Range's locations. Some of these cafés are also known as Café Eighty-Nine.

In August 2016 and October 2016, The Range entered both the Republic of Ireland and Northern Ireland respectively. Dawson also indicated he had expansion plans for Mainland Europe.

In June 2017, the retailer opened a new distribution centre in Avonmouth, Bristol.

In September 2017, for its e-commerce operations, the business was recognised as a leading multi-channel retailer in the Internet Retailing UK Top 250 and the EU Top 350 indices.

In August 2018, The Range announced a concession partnership with supermarket chain Iceland. Later, Iceland and The Range announced Iceland Cafés would open in certain locations.

In March 2019, the retailer announced it would open a new head office, relocating from the Estover area of Plymouth, to a new building in the Derriford area of Plymouth, next door to its flagship store. It was reported to employ over 300 people.

In March 2020, the chain was criticised by customers and staff for continuing to stay open during the first COVID-19 lockdown when the majority of the items it sold were not considered 'essential'. The store argued that it was an essential retailer as it carried toiletries, pet and cleaning products, as well as 50 stores having frozen food concessions. Staff at two stores in Bristol were told that freezers were installed in mid-March of that year in order to ensure that the stores could remain open. The leader of Basildon Council described The Range as 'the worst of British business' for remaining open in the circumstances. Hygiene & safety measures in stores were also criticised.

In November 2024, The Range opened a new distribution centre in Stowmarket, Suffolk, reportedly creating 1,000 jobs.

In November 2025, The Range opened a concession inside a Tesco store in Yardley, being its first store-in-store. They opened another inside a Morrisons store in Palmers Green in August 2026.

In October 2026, they were shown to be interested in rival chain Poundland.

== Other brands ==
=== Wilko ===
Wilko logo

In September 2023, it purchased the Wilko brand from administrators for £5 million, no stores were rescued. On 12 October 2023, it relaunched Wilko's website and their products would begin to be sold at The Range's stores starting the same month. On 1 December 2023, it returned Wilko to the high street, opening the first two locations in Plymouth and Exeter, and then proceeded to open four more locations. In November 2024, it opened the seventh Wilko store in Uxbridge.

In February 2025, it was announced that new Wilko location openings had been put on hold, whilst the team focuses on Homebase.

=== Homebase ===
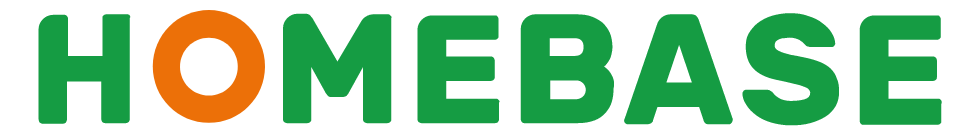
Homebase brand logo

In November 2024, CDS Superstores purchased the Homebase brand and 49 stores from administrators.

On 17 January 2025, it converted the first three acquired Homebase sites to The Range fascia, each with a 'Garden Centre by Homebase' concept. At midnight on 21 January, it re-launched the Homebase website. In February 2025, it was announced that both the in-store 'Jonas & James' and 'The Range Kitchens' brands would be merged and rebranded to 'Kitchens by Homebase'. The Ruislip opening on 21 March introduced the first 'Kitchens by Homebase' concept. On 16 May, CDS completed their conversion programme with 49 former Homebase locations rebranded to 'The Range', each with a 'Garden Centre by Homebase' concept. The Range were also planning to convert the former Homebase unit in Stamford, but pulled out of the deal with the landlord prior to it opening, with the unit becoming B&M instead.

In June 2025, it was announced CDS would open an Irish version of the Homebase website. In August 2025, an additional empty Homebase unit located in Bradford was reopened as The Range. In November and December 2025, The Range opened in empty Homebase units located in Oldbury and Wolverhampton.

=== Bathstore ===
In December 2024, it was announced that CDS Superstores had consideration with the administrators of Homebase for acquiring the Bathstore brand, which was not included in their initial purchase of Homebase assets. In January 2025, Bathstore goods appeared on CDS Superstores' relaunched version of the Homebase website. In April 2025, it was announced that CDS Superstores would open Bathstore showrooms in certain stores of The Range. On 25 April 2025, the Bathstore intellectual property was officially transferred to CDS Superstores' ownership.

In September 2025, the first Bathstore concession inside a branch of The Range was opened in Milton Keynes.
