= Plymstock School =

School in Plymouth, Devon, England

Location
- Church Road; Plymouth, Devon, PL9 9AZ; England; 50°21′44″N 4°05′17″W

Information
- Type: Academy
- Motto: Inspired by our community.
- Established: 1911
- Trust: Westcountry Schools Trust
- Department for Education URN: 136568 Tables
- Ofsted: Reports
- Headmaster: Stuart Koehler-Lewis
- Teaching staff: 76
- Gender: Coeducational
- Age range: 11-18
- Enrolment: 1,559
- Sixth form students: 207
- Website: www.plymstockschool.org.uk

Plymstock School is a state comprehensive secondary school (ages 11–18) in Plymstock, a suburb of Plymouth, Devon, England. It was the first West Devon comprehensive school (built on the core of a post war secondary school), transitioning to a specialist sports college under the Specialist Schools Programme in 2002. In April 2011, the school became an academy and in 2017 joined Westcountry Schools Trust. As of 2025 it has 1,559 students, of whom 207 are in the sixth form.

Plymstock School was maintained by Devon County Council until 1 April 1967, when it was transferred to Plymouth City Council which has maintained it until April 2011. In 2003, it underwent what was reported as a budget crisis, forcing redundancies and reduced spending on new classrooms to replace temporary facilities. In 2019, A £2.5 million funding package was approved by Plymouth City Council to expand Plymstock School. This expansion project included a Performing Arts Centre and an additional six new classrooms with toilet facilities.

Many of the latest school ratings, in local and national newspapers, have placed Plymstock in the top 10 of Plymouth schools, with the higher ranked schools being selective or fee-paying schools, and within the top 800 of England. (Herald, The Independent). As of the 2023, OFSTED report, this school has been rated as overall 'GOOD’.

Plymstock's local feeder primary schools include: Elburton Primary; Hooe Primary; Dunstone Primary; Pomphlett Primary; and Oreston Primary.

== History ==
The school was opened on 26 April 1911 as the Plymstock Senior Mixed School, and replaced the Dean Cross Elementary School for Boys. The first headmaster was T. F. Jarvis. Its name was changed to Plymstock County Senior Mixed School, and then to Plymstock County Secondary School, and in September 1961 to its current name. In 1965, it became a comprehensive school, and the buildings were extended between 1969 and 1970 to accommodate a further 300 pupils.

On 4 April 2006, the school achieved a Guinness World Record for "Most people playing parachute" when 1,547 children played with 58 parachutes at the same time. The world record stood until 30 June 2011, when it was beaten by children from the Gaza Strip with 3520 people.

Plymstock School features in the German secondary school English textbook *Access* (published by Cornelsen Verlag) and is therefore familiar to many pupils in Germany.
