= Anna Hansen =

Canadian-born chef

Anna Hansen MBE
- Culinary career
- Cooking style: Fusion cuisine
- Current restaurant: The Modern Pantry
- Previous restaurants: The French House; Green Street; The Sugar Club; Providores

Anna Lise Hansen is a Canadian-born chef, who was raised in New Zealand and now runs The Modern Pantry in London, United Kingdom.

== Culinary career ==
Anna Hansen was born in Canada to parents who were originally from New Zealand but with European heritages. Her mother's family originated from Denmark, while her father's family were from Switzerland and Belgium. She gained a weekend job working in a deli in New Zealand, but decided to travel after completing a degree in business management and having two applications for teaching training college turned down. At the age of 22, she arrived in London, England.

She was first introduced to professional kitchens when she gained a job as a kitchen porter at The French House, Soho, as at the time, she was a housemate of chef Margot Henderson's sister who ran the restaurant. Margot's husband Fergus Henderson would become one of Hansen's mentors alongside New Zealand chef Peter Gordon. During her time at The French House, she rose up the various positions in the kitchen until she became head chef.

She moved to become a sous chef at Gordon's Green Street restaurant, and then a pastry chef with him at private-members club the Sugar Club. At the time, they sought to create a fusion cuisine-based menu, but the owners disliked it and changed the restaurant to something less high end. In response, Hansen and Gordon opened the Providores restaurant with Gordon after spending some time working in restaurants in Australia and New Zealand. She left the Providores in 2005, and opened her own restaurant, The Modern Pantry in 2008. In 2011, her cookbook based on the work of the restaurant was published and she was appointed as a Member of the Order of the British Empire the following year. She has since opened a second site for The Modern Pantry, as well as a bar in Finsbury Square.
