= ITV Studios =

British television production company

ITV Studios Limited
- Logo used since 2019
- Formerly: Granada Media Group Limited (1995–2006); ITV Productions Limited (2006–2008)
- Type: Subsidiary
- Industry: Television
- Genre: Television production; broadcast syndication; home video
- Predecessor: Granada: Granada Productions; Granada International; Granada Media Group; Granada Video; Granada Ventures; Carlton: The Rank Organisation; Rank Film Distributors; General Film Distributors; Gaumont-British; ITC Entertainment; ITC Film Distributors; Carlton Visual Entertainment; Longman Video; Screen Legends; Pickwick Video; Central Video; CTE Video; Rank Home Video; ITC Home Video; Precision Video; Carlton Productions; Carlton International; ITV: ITV Productions; ITV Studios Home Entertainment; ITV Studios publishing and consumer licensing division; ITV Worldwide
- Founded: 1954; 72 years ago (as Granada Productions)
- Headquarters: London, England
- Area served: Europe: United Kingdom; Belgium; France; Germany; Italy; Netherlands; Norway; Denmark; Sweden; Finland; Spain; Middle East: Israel; Other territories: United States; Australia; Algeria
- Key people: Julian Bellamy (Managing Director); Kieron Roberts (Manchester ITV Studios); Kate Bartlett (London ITV Studios); Mike Beale (Director of International Formats)
- Services: Television programme production
- Revenue: ▲£499 million (2020/21)
- Net income: ▲£133 million (2020/21)
- Parent: Granada plc (1954–2004); ITV plc (2004–present)
- Divisions: ITV America; ITV Entertainment; ITV Studios Australia; ITV Studios Continuing Drama; ITV Studios France; ITV Studios Germany; ITV Studios Global Creative Network; ITV Studios Global Distribution; ITV Studios Iberia; ITV Studios Middle East; ITV Studios Netherlands; ITV Studios Nordic; ITV Ventures
- Subsidiaries: Full list of subsidiaries
- Website: www.itvstudios.com

ITV Studios Limited is a British multinational television media company owned by British television broadcaster ITV plc. It handles production and distribution of programmes broadcast on the ITV network and third-party broadcasters, and is based in 12 countries across 60 production labels, with local production offices in the UK, the US, Belgium, Australia, Germany, the Netherlands, Italy, Israel, France, Spain, and Scandinavia.

== About ==
ITV Studios not only makes programmes primarily for its parent company ITV plc, but also for other networks such as the BBC and Channel 4. It was formed from a gradual amalgamation of the production divisions of all ITV plc owned 'Channel 3' licensees which occurred from 1994 to 2004, and for a number of years thereafter following the creation of ITV plc.

The division is also responsible for ITV's production facilities The London Studios, 3SixtyMedia (based at ITV Granada, and co-owned with BBC Studioworks), and location hire company ProVision (based at ITV Yorkshire, with sales offices at ITV Granada and The London Studios). ITV Studios Global Entertainment (formerly Granada International and Granada Ventures) is responsible for sales of finished programmes, formats and commercial licensing deals.

== History ==
=== Granada Media ===
ITV Studios Limited's history can be traced back to Granada Productions, which was founded in 1954 as Granada Television's in-house production arm.

=== Carlton International ===
Central Television Enterprises, Central Independent Television's international sales operations founded in 1987. Central Television Enterprises was later acquired by Carlton Communications in 1994 when they purchased Central, renaming the company as CTE (Carlton) Limited. In March 1998, CTE was renamed as Carlton International Media Limited.

=== ITV Studios ===
Granada plc purchased Carlton Communications and renamed itself ITV plc in 2004, the international division of Granada plc was folded into Carlton International, which assumed the name of Granada International. Meanwhile, Carlton's TV unit was folded into Granada's but retained the "Granada Media Group" name. In March 2004, Action Time, the Carlton-owned format distributor for game shows which before the merger had operated as a semi-independent company, was folded into Granada's operations and the name was retired.

In January 2006, the company assumed the name "ITV Productions" for all produced shows airing on ITV networks, while the Granada name was retained on shows that aired on non-ITV channels, such as Channel 4's Countdown, University Challenge and The Royle Family for the BBC. However, Welsh programmes would always retain the "ITV Cymru" brand. Granada Media Group Limited was renamed ITV Productions Limited in December 2006.

In December 2007, ITV Productions announced that they had acquired British production company behind entertainment formats 12 Yard, marking their first acquisition.

In February 2008, ITV announced that they would wind up the Granada brand and merge Granada International and Granada Ventures into a then-unnamed business. Some of ITV Studios' subsidiaries, such as ITV Studios Australia, would also retire the Granada name in 2013.

In May 2008, ITV Productions announced that they had acquired Swedish-based Scandinavian independent television production company Silverback.

On 17 November 2009, the company announced that they would split its main production arm into four separate departments for factual, entertainment, daytime and scripted.

In July 2012, ITV Studios announced that they had expanded their operations into Norway by acquiring Norwegian production company Mediacircus.

In August 2012, ITV Studios announced that they had acquired Graham Norton's independent comedy entertainment production company So Television.

In July 2013, ITV Studios announced that they had acquired production company Big Talk Productions with ITV Studios global distribution arm ITV Studios Global Entertainment taking over Big Talk's programmes worldwide.

In June 2015, ITV Studios announced that they had acquired the remaining 75% stake in British television production company Mammoth Screen. Later, that same month ITV Studios announced that they had bought Twofour Group.

In May 2017, ITV plc acquired production company World Productions. As a result of the takeover, the company became a part of ITV Studios, with ITV Studios Global Entertainment handling international distribution of future series. That same year, ITV Studios also acquired Swedish game show and entertainment programming producer Elk Production, a stake in Danish drama producer Apple Tree Productions, founded by former DR Drama Deputy Head Lars Hermann and Piv Bernth (producer of the hit series The Killing) who had both left public broadcaster DR (which was the home of The Killing), Cattleya is also a partner in Vision Distribution, an Italian film distribution company founded in 2016 with Sky Italia, Wildside (owned by ITV Studios' rival Fremantle), Lucisano Media Group, Palomar and Indiana Production.

In April 2017, American horror film production company Blumhouse Productions sold a 45% stake in their independent television studio Blumhouse Television to ITV. Blumhouse is known for their globally successful films such as Paranormal Activity and Insidious.

In June 2017, ITV Studios announced that they had acquired Swedish production company Elk Production.

In October 2017, ITV Studios announced that they had acquired a majority stake in Italian film and television production company Cattleya, which is well known for producing the 2015 crime film Suburra and the 2017 RAI/Netflix television series co-production that serves as a prequel to it.

In December 2017, ITV Studios announced that they had acquired a 25% stake in Danish scripted production company Apple Tree Productions with ITV Studios' distribution division ITV Studios Global Entertainment will exclusively distribute Apple Tree's shows internationally. Four years later, in March 2021, ITV Studios announced that they were increasing their stake in Danish scripted production company Apple Tree Productions by taking major control to a 51% majority stake.

On 1 October 2019, ITV Studios restructured their entire distribution business. The Creative Network division, led by Mike Beale, consists of all of ITVS' unscripted format labels in and outside the United Kingdom, including recently acquired Israeli company Armoza Formats. The Global Entertainment division, based in the Netherlands, focuses on international sales of ITVS' unscripted formats. As a result, Talpa Media became defunct while Talpa Global was absorbed into the Global Entertainment division. The Global Distribution division will handle ITVS' drama and finished-tape catalogue as well as co-financing, co-production and production of scripted series.

On 1 July 2020, ITV Studios announced a music partnership with BMG Rights Management (the sister company to ITV Studios' rival Fremantle via both companies' parent Bertelsmann), which includes a joint venture production music label.

In March 2021, ITV Studios announced that they had rebranded their division ITV Studios Entertainment to Lifted Entertainment, with Syco Entertainment creative director and executive producer Lee McNicholas joining the rebranded label.

On 28 April 2021, ITV Studios expanded into Spain with the launch of Cattleya Producciones, an offshoot of their Italian subsidiary Cattleya.

In July 2024, ITV Studios acquired a majority stake in Hartswood Films. ITV will also handle worldwide distribution of their future shows. In the same month, ITV sold their 45% stake in Blumhouse Television back to Blumhouse.

In October 2024, ITV Studios acquired a majority stake in British production company Eagle Eye Drama, along with its Belgian-based production company Happy Duck Films, which globally distributes Eagle Eye's programmes globally with Channel 4's Growth Fund, dropping their 25% stake, whilst ITV Studios will handle distribution of Eagle Eye's future programmes.

On 23 November 2024, Sky News reported that CVC Capital Partners, TF1, RedBird Capital Partners, All3Media, Mediawan and Kohlberg Kravis Roberts had been linked to a potential takeover bid for ITV plc and a possible break-up of core assets such as ITV Studios and ITVX.

On 30 January 2025, Reuters reported that RedBird IMI were in early-stage talks with ITV plc to merge the All3Media and ITV Studios production businesses. However, in July 2026, All3Media merged with Banijay Group's media production and distribution arm instead to form the second incarnation of Banijay Entertainment.

== Output ==
ITV Studios is a major commercial TV producer in the UK, creating over 3,500 hours of original programming each year across all genres except news. Its network programmes include, or have included, Coronation Street, Emmerdale, Heartbeat, Agatha Christie's Marple and Agatha Christie's Poirot, Brainiac: Science Abuse, I'm a Celebrity...Get Me Out of Here!, Parkinson, Ant & Dec's Saturday Night Takeaway, Tonight, The Jeremy Kyle Show and This Morning.

ITV Studios also produces programmes for other UK broadcasters outside of its own network. These include the BBC, Channel 4, Channel 5 and Sky. ITV Studios is based in London and Manchester, with the centre in Leeds now only home to Emmerdale and Multistory Media (formerly Yorkshire-Tyne Tees Television's then Granada Productions' northern features department). The production centres in Bristol and Norwich closed in 2006 and 2012 respectively. ITV Studios also owns So Television after acquiring Graham Norton's production company in 2012. On 22 April 2013, ITV announced they had acquired production company The Garden for £18 million; it is best known for producing Channel 4 series 24 Hours in A&E. In 2013, ITV launched a new production company named Potato. 2016 saw ITV Studios secure a four-year British horse racing deal which saw the Cheltenham Festival, Grand National and Royal Ascot all be shown on ITV.

On 14 January 2013, the ITV logo was added to the opening credits of the majority of ITV Studios-produced shows airing on ITV's channels, similar to the BBC.

== Assets ==
Assets owned by ITV Studios include:

Region/Country	Units
United Kingdom	5 Acts Productions; Big Talk Studios; Boom Group; Bright Entertainment; Eagle Eye Drama; The Garden; Genial Productions; Happy Prince; Hartswood Films; Jeff Pope's Factual Drama; Lifted Entertainment; Mainstreet Pictures; Mammoth Screen; Monumental Pictures; Multistory Media; Noho Film & Television; Oxford Scientific Films; Patrick Spence Drama; Possessed; Quay Street Productions; The Rank Organisation; Route 24; Silverprint Pictures; So Television; Tall Story Pictures; Twofour; World Productions
France	Tetra Media Studios; Tetra Media Fiction; Beaubourg; Beaubourg Fiction; Colette Productions; Good Cop Productions; Gramma Productions; L'Intruse; Maconda; Macondo; Tangaro; Tangaro/CLC
Germany	Bildergarten Entertainment; Imago TV; Windlight Pictures
Italy	Cattleya S.r.l; Moontrip
Nordic countries	Apple Tree Productions (Denmark); Elk Production (Sweden); United Productions (Denmark)
Spain and Portugal	Cattleya Producciones; ITV Studios Iberia; Plano a Plano
Belgium	Happy Duck Films (25% with Eagle Eye Drama)
Australia	Lingo Pictures
United States	ITV America; Bedrock Entertainment; Circle of Confusion Television Studio; ITV Entertainment; Good Caper Content; High Noon Entertainment; Leftfield Pictures; Sirens Media; ThinkFactory Media; Tomorrow Studios; Work Friends
Israel	Armoza Formats
International	ITV Studios Continuing Drama; ITV Studios Global Creative Network; ITV Studios Global Distribution (formed by the merger of Twofour Rights); ITV Ventures
Former/Defunct	Anglia Television (United Kingdom); Anglia Television Entertainment; ATV Network (United Kingdom); ATV Music Publishing; Blumhouse Television (United States, 40% with Blumhouse Productions); Boomerang (United Kingdom); Border Television (United Kingdom); Cosgrove Hall Films (United Kingdom); Carlton Communications (United Kingdom); Carlton Home Entertainment; Carlton International; Action Time; Planet 24; Carlton Screen Advertising; Carlton Publishing Group; Carlton Television; Central Independent Television (United Kingdom); Crook Productions (United Kingdom); 12 Yard (United Kingdom); ITV Studios Daytime (United Kingdom); ITV Digital (United Kingdom); Granada plc (United Kingdom); Granada Productions; Granada International; Granada Ventures; Granada TV Rental; Granada Theatres; Granada Motorway Services; Telerent; Granada Television; Gameface (United Kingdom); Gurney Productions (United States); Harlech Television (United Kingdom); Harvest Entertainment; ITC Entertainment (United Kingdom); London Weekend Television (United Kingdom); Loud TV (United States); Meridian Broadcasting (United Kingdom); Outpost Entertainment (United States); Potato (United Kingdom); Rollercoaster Television (United Kingdom); Red Bandit Media (United States); Second Act Productions (United Kingdom); Tyne Tees Television (United Kingdom); Twofour America; Westcountry Television (United Kingdom); Yorkshire Television (United Kingdom); Zodiac Entertainment (United States)

== Production franchises of ITV Studios ==
In 2004, a duopoly had formed, and Granada owned six franchises, whilst Carlton Communications owned five. Granada bought a 64% controlling stake and took over Carlton in 2004 with the amalgamation of ITV. Consequently, programmes produced by all divisions were referred to as 'A Granada Manchester Production', 'A Granada London Production', etc., at the end of credits. ITV Studios comprises the network production divisions from its following predecessor companies:

- ITV Anglia
- ITV Central formerly Carlton Central, Central Independent Television and ATV.
- ITV Granada
- ITV Wales & West (formerly HTV) – including its former subsidiary, Harvest Entertainment.
- ITV London (Carlton Television and London Weekend Television)
- ITV Meridian
- ITV Tyne Tees
- ITV Yorkshire
- ITV Breakfast (formerly GMTV)

ITV Border and ITV Westcountry rarely contributed network programmes, so were largely unaffected by the creation of ITV Studios except for the closure of their local news studios. Whilst continuing to present local programming, these are produced from Gateshead and Bristol respectively.

== Local operations ==
=== Current ===
==== 5 Acts Productions ====
A new label founded by David P. Davis, formerly of Sony Pictures Television-owned Bad Wolf, which will be based in Cardiff and operate under Patrick Spence's scripted division at ITV Studios.

==== Big Talk Studios ====
Big Talk Studios is a film and television production company founded on 11 February 1994 by Nira Park and was acquired by ITV Studios on 26 July 2013.

The company has produced critically acclaimed films such as Baby Driver, Edgar Wright's Three Flavours Cornetto trilogy, Scott Pilgrim vs. the World, Paul and Sightseers. Television series produced by Big Talk include Mum, Back and the revived Cold Feet.

==== Boom Group ====
On 29 June 2015, a majority stake of Boom Supervisory Ltd was acquired by ITV Studios, which had acquired Twofour five days earlier. Boom Supervisory was the holding company for subsidiaries such as Boomerang, Boom Cymru and Indus. The Boom Group is currently one of the largest Welsh entertainment production companies, comprising four production divisions, Boom Cymru, for Welsh productions, Boom for productions for the rest of the United Kingdom outside of Wales as well as international markets, Boom Kids for children's programming and Boom Social for digital content.

On 9 September 2020, Boom Cymru, along with Twofour, took over production of some series from sister label Boomerang when ITV shut the label down.

==== Bright Entertainment ====
Bright Entertainment is a scalable entertainment, reality, and competitive formats label of ITV Studios. It was formed in January 2026 by Commissioner Lily Wilson, and is run by much of Potato's former staff, including creative directors Martin Scott and Phil Mount and head of production Christina Clayton. The division consists of properties held by the former Potato and 12 Yard studios, including The Chase and Bullseye.

==== Eagle Eye Drama ====
ITV Studios acquired a majority stake in Eagle Eye Drama in October 2024.

==== Happy Prince ====
Happy Prince is a label of ITV Studios run by Dominic Treadwell-Collins.

==== The Garden ====
The Garden was created in 2010 to produce "cutting edge, ambitious, distinctive factual programmes for major broadcasters in both the United Kingdom and outside and to be the most ideal production company we can be, where programming producers can do their very best work and that always delivers exceptional television." On 22 April 2013, The Garden was acquired by ITV Studios. It is known for producing 24 Hours in A&E for Channel 4, Inside Claridge's for BBC Two, and Squid Game: The Challenge for Netflix.

==== ITV Studios Continuing Drama ====
ITV Studios Continuing Drama is an in-house division that handles the production of the soaps Coronation Street and Emmerdale.

==== Lifted Entertainment ====
Lifted Entertainment (formerly known as ITV Studios Entertainment) is the unscripted production division of ITV Studios that rebranded under its current name in early 2021. The label is known for producing many ITV programmes such as Love Island, Dancing on Ice, In for a Penny, I'm a Celebrity...Get Me Out of Here! and The Voice UK, as well as programmes for other broadcasters such as Channel 4's Countdown, You've Been Framed! and BBC Two's University Challenge.

In June 2021, it was announced that Simon Cowell's new Syco game show Walk the Line would be developed with Lifted Entertainment rather than with Thames/Fremantle (known for The X Factor and Britain's Got Talent).

==== Mainstreet Pictures ====
Mainstreet Pictures is a drama label of ITV Studios run by joint MDs Sally Haynes and Laura Mackie. Mainstreet Pictures is well known for producing the hit ITV series Unforgotten.

==== Mammoth Screen ====
Mammoth Screen is a British television drama production company that was established in 2007 by Michele Buck and Damien Timmer and is a subsidiary of ITV Studios. It produces drama for key British broadcasters, especially ITV and the BBC, and also for international distribution. Examples of Mammoth Screen productions are Endeavour, McDonald & Dodds, Poldark, Victoria and the ITV/Amazon Prime Video co-production Vanity Fair.

==== Monumental Pictures ====
Monumental Pictures was founded in 2014 by producers Alison Owen and Debra Hayward, well known for their participation in films such as Les Misérables and Saving Mr. Banks, to produce film and television content. At the end of April 2015, ITV Studios acquired a minority stake in Monumental Pictures, which later became 51% on 18 July 2019 four years later. Examples of Monumental Pictures productions are Will for TNT, Anne with an E for CBC Television and Netflix and Harlots for Hulu.

==== Multistory Media ====
Multistory Media originally started as the factual entertainment and features network production departments of Tyne Tees Television and Yorkshire Television. When ITV plc was created, the separate departments of these two subsidiaries were merged into Yorkshire Television and renamed Granada Productions North Factual Entertainment and Features. It was then renamed again as the Northern factual entertainment and features department within ITV Yorkshire as part of ITV Productions. At this point an internal reorganisation took place to disband the management structure of Yorkshire Television and transfer the production business from Yorkshire Television Limited to ITV Productions Limited. The departments were then closed as part of a wider company production review but were relaunched in Leeds as Shiver Productions. On 23 May 2019, Shiver Productions changed their name to Multistory Media.

Today, Multistory Media is one of the largest producers of factual entertainment for television in the United Kingdom. Examples of Multistory Media productions are For the Love of Dogs, 60 Minute Makeover and Peter Andre: My Life.

Under a re-structure of ITV Studios Daytime due to cost cutting and efficiencies, ITV Studios Daytime will merge with Multistory Media as of January 2026. As a result it will see the loss of 220 jobs, as Multistory will take on the production of Lorraine, This Morning and Loose Women. Emma Gormley will be the new Managing Director of Multistory Media, in a move which strategically aligns ITV Studios Daytime and Multistory Media within one scaled label. Production of the 3 shows will also move to The H Club Studio in Covent Garden, while Good Morning Britain, will now be produced by ITN and move to their headquarters in Central London.

==== Noho Film & Television ====
Noho Film & Television is a subsidiary of ITV Studios that was originally founded in 2012 as an independent joint by Managing Directors Robert Wulff-Cochrane and Camilla Campbell who both formerly headed the drama department at Channel 4.

==== Oxford Scientific Films ====
Oxford Scientific Films (OSF) is a British company that produces natural history and documentary programmes. Founded on 8 July 1968 by noted documentary filmmaker Gerald Thompson, the independent company broke new ground in the world of documentaries, using new filming techniques and capturing footage of never before filmed activities of its various subjects. In 1996, Oxford Scientific Films was sold to Circle Communications, where it retained its own identity as a division within the company. The following year, Circle Communications was taken over by Southern Star Entertainment UK. Under the new ownership, Oxford Scientific Films continued to enhance its reputation for innovative film-making, producing multiple award-winning series and films, including the highly acclaimed Animal Planet series Meerkat Manor.

In March 2008, parent company Southern Star Group merged its Sydney-based factual business unit into the Oxford Scientific Films division. The merged company used two brands, with the existing Oxford Scientific Films name being used for specialist factual programmes and the Southern Star Factual brand being used for features and factual entertainment shows. In 2009, Fairfax Media sold Southern Star to Endemol but retained OSF. In 2011, OSF was acquired by Boomerang Plus, which transferred it to Boom Pictures in 2012. In 2013, OSF became part of the Twofour Group (now part of ITV Studios).

==== So Television ====
So Television is a television production company founded in 1998 by Irish television and radio presenter, comedian, actor, and author Graham Norton and his partner Graham Stuart, best known for producing Norton's chat shows V Graham Norton and The Graham Norton Show. The company also produces programmes for radio, mainly for BBC Radio 4, via the So Radio division. Both So Television and So Radio are based in London. On 30 August 2012, ITV Studios acquired the company for an estimated £17 million.

==== Tall Story Pictures ====
Founded in 2016, Tall Story Pictures is a television production company. Examples of Tall Story Pictures productions are thriller Trauma, thriller The Bay, and thriller Bancroft, both produced for ITV.

==== Twofour ====
Twofour is a British television and digital media group that was founded in 1989 by Charles Wace, a former BBC news producer. With headquarters in Plymouth, Twofour has offices across the globe including London and Los Angeles.

On 24 June 2015, Twofour Group was acquired by ITV Studios.

Melanie Leach was named Chief Executive for Twofour Group in summer 2014.

Twofour is an international award-winning television production company, producing programming for the BBC, ITV, Channel 4, Channel 5, UKTV and a variety of other British and foreign broadcasters. Twofour was awarded Broadcast's "Best Indie Production Company" title in 2010 and 2014, with titles including The Jump (Channel 4), multi award-winning The Real Marigold Hotel (BBC One/BBC Two) and the fastest selling format of the year, This Time Next Year (ITV) and Channel 5's longest running series, The Hotel Inspector.

The company produces ob-doc and fixed rig shows such as Channel 4's International Emmy winning Educating Yorkshire, Educating the East End and 2011's Educating Essex. In May 2012, Series Director David Clews was awarded a BAFTA Television Craft Award for his work directing Educating Essex.

Twofour has produced a range of adventure documentaries such as Harry's Arctic Heroes for BBC One and Harry's Mountain Heroes for ITV, both featuring Prince Harry and a group of wounded soldiers as they attempt to reach the North Pole and Mount Everest respectively.

On 9 September 2020, Twofour, along with Boom Cymru, took over production of some series from sister label Boomerang when ITV shut the label down.

==== World Productions ====
World Productions is a television production company founded on 20 March 1990 by acclaimed producer Tony Garnett and owned by ITV Studios since May 2017. The company's first major series was the police drama Between The Lines (BBC One, 1992–1994), and throughout the decade they went on to produce a succession of drama series. The most notable of these include This Life (BBC Two, 1996–1997), about a group of young law students in London; vampire thriller Ultraviolet (Channel 4, 1998) and police drama The Cops (BBC Two, 1998–1999), which was so controversial in its depiction of the police force that official police advice was withdrawn for the second series. More recently, the company made the series No Angels for Channel 4 (2004–2006), a drama based around the lives of young nurses, and also Goldplated and for Channel Five it produced the Perfect Day trilogy and Tripping Over, a co production with Network Ten in Australia. It also co-produced, with BBC Cymru Wales, a one-off This Life reunion special, which aired in early 2007.

In 2018, the company produced the hit TV series Bodyguard, which achieved the highest viewing figures for a new BBC drama in the multichannel era and the highest BBC viewing figures since 2008.

=== Defunct ===
==== 12 Yard ====
12 Yard was founded in 2001 by David Young and the creative team behind the worldwide hit Weakest Link and Hat Trick Productions. The company was originally operated as a joint venture until December 2007, when ITV acquired it for £35 million.

12 Yard is a multinational British television production company that creates entertainment formats. Its programmes include the BBC quiz Eggheads; the BBC One lottery shows The National Lottery: In It to Win It and Who Dares Wins; Holding Out for a Hero, Take On the Twisters and Big Star's Little Star for ITV; and Coach Trip for Channel 4.

In October 2024, ITV Studios announced that it would close the studio at the end of the year. In October 2025, ITV officially announced that 12 Yard and sister label Potato would be folded into a newly-formed label, launching as Bright Entertainment in January 2026.

==== ITV Studios Daytime ====
ITV Studios Daytime was an in-house division that handles the production for the weekday daytime programmes Good Morning Britain, Lorraine, This Morning, and Loose Women.

On 8 October 2025, it was announced that the label would merge with Multistory Media, with its programmes moving to the label aside from Good Morning Britain which was already planned to move its production to ITN.

==== Potato ====
Potato was the factual entertainment subsidiary of ITV Studios, established in March 2013. Potato produces television shows such as The Chase, Ninja Warrior UK and CelebAbility, with game shows such as Moneyball and Sitting on a Fortune produced in association with Glenn Hugill's Possessed production company, itself a venture with ITV Studios, based at their headquarters in London.

In October 2025, ITV announced that Potato and sister studio 12 Yard would be folded into a newly-formed entertainment label. The label launched as Bright Entertainment in January 2026.

==== Rollercoaster Television ====
Rollercoaster Television was founded in June 2021 by James Fox & Dom Waugh, who formerly worked at Endemol Shine UK subsidiary Remarkable Television. Rollercoaster aims to produce entertainment programmes with the plan to expand them internationally that would be sold through ITV Studios.

On 22 April 2026, the studio announced that they had gone independent under the name of Rollercoaster Studios, shifting its focus towards the digital-first content market, including podcast and vodcast formats. The studio signed a new production and distribution deal with ITV Studios on the same day.

== International operations ==
ITV Studios have a number of formats broadcasting on various networks around the world. These include franchises for the Love Island and The Voice formats, as well as Let Love Rule, a programme known in the UK as The Cabins and broadcast in a number of territories including as commissions from Discovery in Denmark, TV3 in Latvia, and TV JOJ in Slovakia (where it will be known as Laska na chate).

=== ITV Studios America or ITV America ===
Co-headquartered in North Hollywood, California, New York City, and in Stamford, Connecticut, ITV Studios US produces programming primarily for US networks, such as: Fox's Hell's Kitchen, Kitchen Nightmares, Sit Down, Shut Up, and Nanny 911; NBC's Hit Me, Baby, One More Time, The Wall, The Voice, Prime Suspect, and Little Friends; CBS' Eleventh Hour; VH1's But Can They Sing? and Celebrity Fit Club; A&E's Airline, The First 48 and House of Dreams; and MTV's Room Raiders.

The company had its origins in 1988 as World International Network by Larry Gershman, a consortium of companies like Central Independent Television, which was rebranded into Hamdon Entertainment when the remaining two partners (Carlton and ARD/Studio Hamburg) bought it in 1995, as Larry Gershman started a new version of World International Network in 1996, before taking it outright as Carlton America in 1999, and Granada Entertainment USA, which was formed by Granada Media Group in 1997, before eventually took on the Granada America moniker when Granada and Carlton merged in 2003.

In 2006, Granada, in association with FremantleMedia North America, produced Gameshow Marathon, an American version of Ant & Dec's Gameshow Marathon for CBS.

Television movies from Granada and ITV Studios US include: Molly Shannon in 12 Days of Christmas Eve; Jason Priestley in Reality of Love; Farrah Fawcett in Hollywood Lives, based on Jackie Collins' best selling novel; Anne Heche in Dead Will Tell; Melanie Griffith in Lethal Seduction; Jon Voight and Cary Elwes in Pope John Paul II (2005 miniseries), Matthew Perry in The Ron Clark Story (2006), Aidan Quinn and Mary-Louise Parker in Unexpected Journey, Susan Sarandon in Ice Bound. Hamdon Entertainment and Television programmes now owned domestically from its former ITC library include 1978 adaptation of Les Misérables (Richard Jordan, Anthony Perkins), The Scarlet and the Black (1983 Gregory Peck, Christopher Plummer), Not My Kid (1985 George Segal, Stockard Channing) and At Mother's Request (1987).

In 2007, the chief executive officer of the division, then named Granada America, was David Gyngell, son of the late Bruce Gyngell, the former managing director of former ITV breakfast franchisee TV-am and Yorkshire-Tyne Tees Television. In 2007, the company partnered with legendary TV movie producer Jaffe/Braunstein Films and ran under the name Jaffe/Braunstein Entertainment. By 2008, David Gyngell had left the company and joined Nine Entertainment in Australia. The unit was re-branded under the ITV Studios banner in May 2009.

On 7 May 2014, ITV Studios announced the acquisition of Leftfield Entertainment, which produces reality shows such as Pawn Stars, Counting Cars and American Restoration. ITV took an 80% stake in the company initially, according to ITV this will make them "largest unscripted independent producer in the US" In December 2015, with the purchase of Leftfield, ITV Studios US Group was rebranded as ITV America.

On 4 April 2017, Blumhouse Productions mainly known for their horror movies, announced the launch of an independent television studio with ITV Studios acquiring a 45% stake.

In 2018, ITV announced a relocated of a large part of their operations from California and New York City to Stamford, Connecticut, creating 450 new jobs in the process.

==== Subsidiaries ====
- Circle of Confusion Television Studios (joint venture with talent management company Circle of Confusion; well known for producing the cult AMC post-apocalyptic horror series The Walking Dead and its companion piece Fear the Walking Dead)
- Good Caper Content
- High Noon Entertainment (well known for producing Cake Boss for TLC and Fixer Upper for HGTV)
- ITV Entertainment
- Leftfield Pictures
- Sirens Media (well known for producing The Real Housewives of New Jersey for Bravo)
- Thinkfactory Media (producers of TBS' Rat in the Kitchen show with Natasha Leggero)
- Tomorrow Studios (joint venture with Marty Adelstein)
  - Work Friends (animation label)
- ITV Studios America (Los Angeles-based scripted television production division; well known for producing Somewhere Between with Thunderbird Entertainment for ABC and Good Witch for Hallmark Channel)
  - Bedrock Entertainment (joint venture with Tony To and Daniel Sackheim)

=== ITV Studios Australia ===
ITV Studios Australia is the Australian division of ITV Studios, based at Fox Studios Australia in Sydney. The company has its origins in production company Artist Services, a company formed in 1989 by a group of investors including Steve Vizard, producing many classic shows. Half of the company was sold to John Fairfax Holdings in 1995 for A$9 million, at a time when the company was generating about $50 million per year. In 1998, the entire company was acquired by Granada for A$25 million.

The company rebranded as ITV Studios Australia in January 2013, with the first programme carrying the new branding being the second season of the Australian Broadcasting Corporation comedy news programme Shaun Micallef's Mad as Hell.

=== ITV Studios Germany ===
ITV Studios Germany productions include Ich bin ein Star – Holt mich hier raus! (the local version of I'm a Celebrity... Get Me Out of Here!), Star Duell and Deutschlands Beste Doppelgänger (Stars And Their Doubles) for RTL; and East-West German comedy Ei Verbibbsch for Sat.1. ITV Studios Germany was previously known as Granada Germany.

At the start of October 2008, ITV acquired a 51.2% controlling stake in German television production company Imago TV, founded in 1999 by journalists Andrea Schönhuber-Majewski and Fabian Sabo. This deal gave ITV exclusive international rights to distribute and exploit content, format and series rights retained by Imago.

==== Bildergarten Entertainment ====
Bildergarten Entertainment was launched by ITV Studios on 19 May 2021 as the replacement for Talpa Germany, the company originally founded by John de Mol and co-owned by Axel Springer SE until 2015. Bildergarten Entertainment is responsible for Dickes Deutschland and the German version of Lange Leve de Liefde (The Cabins) on RTL Zwei, The Voice of Germany for ProSieben/SAT.1 and Sing Meinen Song on VOX.

=== Armoza Formats ===
Armoza Formats is an Israeli unscripted television Formats company founded in 2005 by Avi Armoza that is best known for The Four: Battle for Stardom, La'uf al HaMillion (the original version of Who's Still Standing?) and I Can Do That. At the end of July 2019, ITV Studios acquired Armoza and integrated it into their Creative Network division. In April 2024, Armoza bought the company back from ITV, returning it to its independent status. Armoza Formats will retain exclusive rights to reproduce ITV Studios' formats in Israel, while ITV will retain rights to Armoza's back catalog.

=== ITV Studios France ===
Ranging from primetime entertainment, talent competitions and daily magazine shows to comedy, drama and documentary, ITV Studios France creates content for broadcasters throughout France. The division has successfully adapted hit international formats for French audiences including 4 Mariages Pour 1 Lune de Miel (a French version of Four Weddings) and The Voice: la plus belle voix (a French version of The Voice) for TF1 and Les 5 anneaux d'or (a French version of 5 Gold Rings) for France 2 and also produces popular original programming such as daily magazine show Je t'aime etc for France 2, comedy series Importantissime for Canal+ and drama feature Quand je serai grande je te tuerai (a French remake of the two-part British thriller television miniseries Undeniable) for TF1.

At the end of February 2017, ITV Studios acquired a majority stake in independent production group Tetra Media Studio, which participates in the fields of fiction (mainly television dramas such as A French Village which is the company is known for producing), documentaries, magazine series, live entertainment, animation, new media, music and distribution; however, Tetra will continue to operate independently from ITV Studios France.

In December 2021, Thierry Lachkar was named as CEO of ITV Studios France.

=== Tetra Media Studio ===
Tetra Media Studio is a French independent television group founded in 1990 by directors Miguel Courtois, Gilles de Maistre and Jérôme Cornuau. The company participates in the fields of fiction (mainly television dramas such as A French Village which is the company is known for producing), documentaries, magazine series and live entertainment. The group consists of:

In June 2004, 13 years before ITV Studios brought a majority in stake, Tetra Media Studios' parent StudioExpand had sold its scripted production label Tetra Media Studio to film producer Jean-François Boyer.

==== Fiction (Tetra Media Fiction) ====
- Beaubourg
- Macondo

==== Documentaries, magazine series & live entertainment ====
- Tangaro/CLC Productions

=== ITV Studios Nordic ===
ITV Studios Nordic is the division of ITV Studios in the Nordic countries, operating through five units: ITV Studios Norway, ITV Studios Finland, ITV Studios Sweden (including Elk Production) and two companies in Denmark named United Productions and Apple Tree Productions respectively.

=== ITV Studios Netherlands ===
ITV Studios Netherlands is the Dutch division of ITV Studios, created on 11 October 2018. On 1 October 2019, it absorbed Talpa Netherlands (including Talpa Global, Talpa Productions and Fictie) and also MasMedia and Vorst Media as part of ITV Studios' restructuring. ITV Studios Netherlands produces shows on both RTL 4 and SBS6, including Lang Leve de Liefde (also known as Let Love Rule or The Cabins), a format exported to the UK, Belgium, Sweden and Portugal.

=== Talpa Media ===
Talpa Media was a Dutch global television production company owned by ITV Studios and before that Talpa Network which was well known for creating the successful worldwide music reality competition franchise The Voice. The company comprised Talpa Netherlands (which consisted of Talpa Content and Talpa Productions) and Talpa Global. On 1 October 2019, founder John de Mol left Talpa when ITV Studios began restructuring.

==== Talpa Global ====
Talpa Global comprised divisions in North America, the Middle East and Germany, although other partnerships were vested in the United Kingdom, France, Italy, Portugal, the Nordic countries, Australia and Sub-Saharan Africa. The North American division was based in Los Angeles, California, the United States, while the Middle East division was based in Dubai, the United Arab Emirates and the German division has offices in Berlin and Hamburg. When ITV started restructuring on 1 October 2019, Talpa's German division was absorbed into ITV Studios Germany and the Middle East division was renamed ITV Studios Middle East.

=== Distribution ===
In addition to its production labels, ITV Studios is the worldwide distributor of programming produced by ITV's production teams and independent producers. Known until 2020 as ITV Studios Global Entertainment, ITVS has distributed programmes and films like Brief Encounter, The Red Shoes, and the Carry On... films. Also, a part of this collection is the ITC Entertainment feature film library, including The Eagle Has Landed, The Return of the Pink Panther, and On Golden Pond. ITV also owns the rights to the film catalogues of The Rank Organisation (except for Ealing Studios productions) and Alexander Korda (pre-1945). These films are currently distributed theatrically by Janus Films and Park Circus, in conjunction with Westchester Films, whose parent company Shout! Factory signed a North American theatrical, television, and home video distribution deal with the ITV library in March 2018. This deal covers over a hundred films and series.

The television library features programming by most of the major ITV network companies (except for Thames Television which is divided between Fremantle for general entertainment and Boat Rocker Media for children's programming; Television South (TVS) which currently belongs to Disney; ABC which currently belongs to StudioCanal, and Southern Television which until recently belonged to Banijay Entertainment); including titles such as Prime Suspect, Doctor Zhivago (2002 miniseries), The Forsyte Saga (2002), and Agatha Christie's Poirot, plus children's shows, TV movies (e.g. 2005's Pope John Paul II), wildlife documentaries, and other factual programming. The library also includes hit series such as Bodyguard (produced by World Productions), which has been picked up by Netflix outside the UK.

Independent productions distributed by ITV include programming produced by Wall to Wall (Ancient Egyptians, The Story Of Us), Darlow Smithson Productions (Seconds From Disaster), Wark Clements (A Mother's Journey), Aardman Animations (Creature Comforts), Ragdoll Productions (Rosie and Jim, Tots TV), Optimum Television (Old Bear Stories), Honeycomb Animation (Grizzly Tales for Gruesome Kids), Chorion (Agatha Christie's Marple and Poirot), Carnival Films (Rosemary & Thyme), and Red Productions (Bob and Rose, Second Coming). ITV also handled non-Spanish, Portuguese and Italian distribution rights to Pocoyo from the show's premiere in 2005 until 2011, when ITV and Zinkia Entertainment ended their distribution agreement.

The company also incorporates ITV Studios Home Entertainment and a publishing and consumer licensing division, responsible for merchandising rights of ITV Productions and third-party programmes (including CBeebies' Numberjacks).
