= Moneybags (game show) =

- Genre: Game show
- Presented by: Craig Charles; Kevin Duala (final four episodes)
- Composer: Dobs Vye
- Country of origin: United Kingdom
- Original language: English
- No. of series: 2
- No. of episodes: 60

Production
- Production location: Dock10
- Running time: 60 minutes (inc. adverts)
- Production company: Youngest North

Original release
- Network: Channel 4
- Release: 8 November 2021 – 24 September 2022

Moneybags is a British game show that aired on Channel 4 from 8 November 2021 to 24 September 2022. It was hosted by Craig Charles, with Kevin Duala filling in for its last four episodes.

== Background ==
On 6 July 2021, the show was commissioned by Channel 4. It is produced by Youngest Media. In February 2022, a second series of 30 episodes was commissioned. In December 2022 after the programme had been axed, it was reported that Moneybags would never return for a third series. In February 2023, Youngest Media closed down and began liquidation, citing the lingering effects of the COVID-19 pandemic on its business.

== Format ==
At the start of each week, 10 new contestants are introduced and £1 million is divided among 100 moneybags, in amounts ranging from £1,000 to £100,000. Twenty bags are chosen at random for each game; once a particular bag is chosen, it is out of play for the rest of the week.

A conveyor belt known as the Money Belt stretches across the stage, with bags entering at one end and the host standing near a chute at the other.

=== Rounds 1 to 3: Head-to-Head ===
At the beginning of each round, two contestants who have not yet played that day are chosen at random. They stand behind the conveyor; the first one chosen stands in "pole position," closer to the bag entry. A category is given, and one bag at a time, marked with a possible answer, is sent along the conveyor. If a contestant believes the answer to be correct, they pick up the bag; if not, they let it pass. The contestant in pole position always has the first chance to take a bag.

After picking up a bag, the contestant peels off its tag to reveal whether the answer is correct or not. Each correct answer is marked with one of the 20 cash amounts in play for that game, which is added to the bank of the contestant who chooses it and promotes them into pole position. Incorrect answers are marked with a red X, relegating the contestant to the end of the conveyor and freezing them out for the next bag. Any bags not picked up by either contestant are checked to determine their value (if any) and discarded down the chute.

Some bags are specially marked as follows:

- Steal: Paired with money on a correct answer. Allows the contestant to take the highest-value bag from the opponent.
- Give Away: Paired with an incorrect answer. Forces the contestant to give their highest-value bag to the opponent.
- Bankrupt: Paired with an incorrect answer. Discards all of the contestant's bags, resetting their bank to zero.

Two categories are played in each round, with a total of five correct answers between them; however, the number of incorrect answers is randomly set. After all five correct answers have been played, the contestant in the lead advances to the Tripleheader Round while their opponent is eliminated for the day with no winnings. Ties are broken in favour of the contestant in pole position after the last correct answer.

=== Round 4: Tripleheader ===
The three head-to-head winners compete against each other in this round, retaining their totals from previous rounds and with their initial positions chosen at random. Play proceeds as before, except that a contestant who receives a Steal or Give Away may choose which opponent is affected.

After the fifth correct answer, the contestant in the lead advances to the final for a chance to win their entire bank. Ties are broken in favour of the one in or closer to pole position.

=== Final ===
The contestant is presented with a category, and two bags come down the conveyor, separated by a short delay. Each bag is marked with an answer, only one of which is correct. Choosing the correct answer awards money, while an incorrect answer at any time ends the game and sends them home with nothing.

Four categories are played in this manner, with each correct answer awarding an increasing percentage of the contestant's bank (10% in series 1 or 5% in series 2, 20%, 50%, 100%). On any category after the first, they may choose to let both bags pass, ending the round and keeping all money won to that point.

Contestants remain eligible to play until appearing on five consecutive episodes or reaching the final once, whichever occurs first.

== Reception ==
Joel Golby of The Guardian wrote "Craig Charles is the perfect quizshow host. Moneybags is the perfect quiz". He considered Charles to be a better host than Gary Lineker on Sitting on a Fortune and the show to have better questions than the Ian Wright-hosted Moneyball, two new ITV game shows.

== Transmissions ==
Series	Start date	End date	Episodes	Notes
1	8 November 2021	19 December 2021	30	
2	15 August 2022	24 September 2022	30	Episodes 27–30 were hosted by Kevin Duala.

== International versions ==
The show was adapted in Spain by À Punt in the Valencian Community as A la saca, hosted by Eugeni Alemany.
