= Sweetings =

Restaurant in London, England

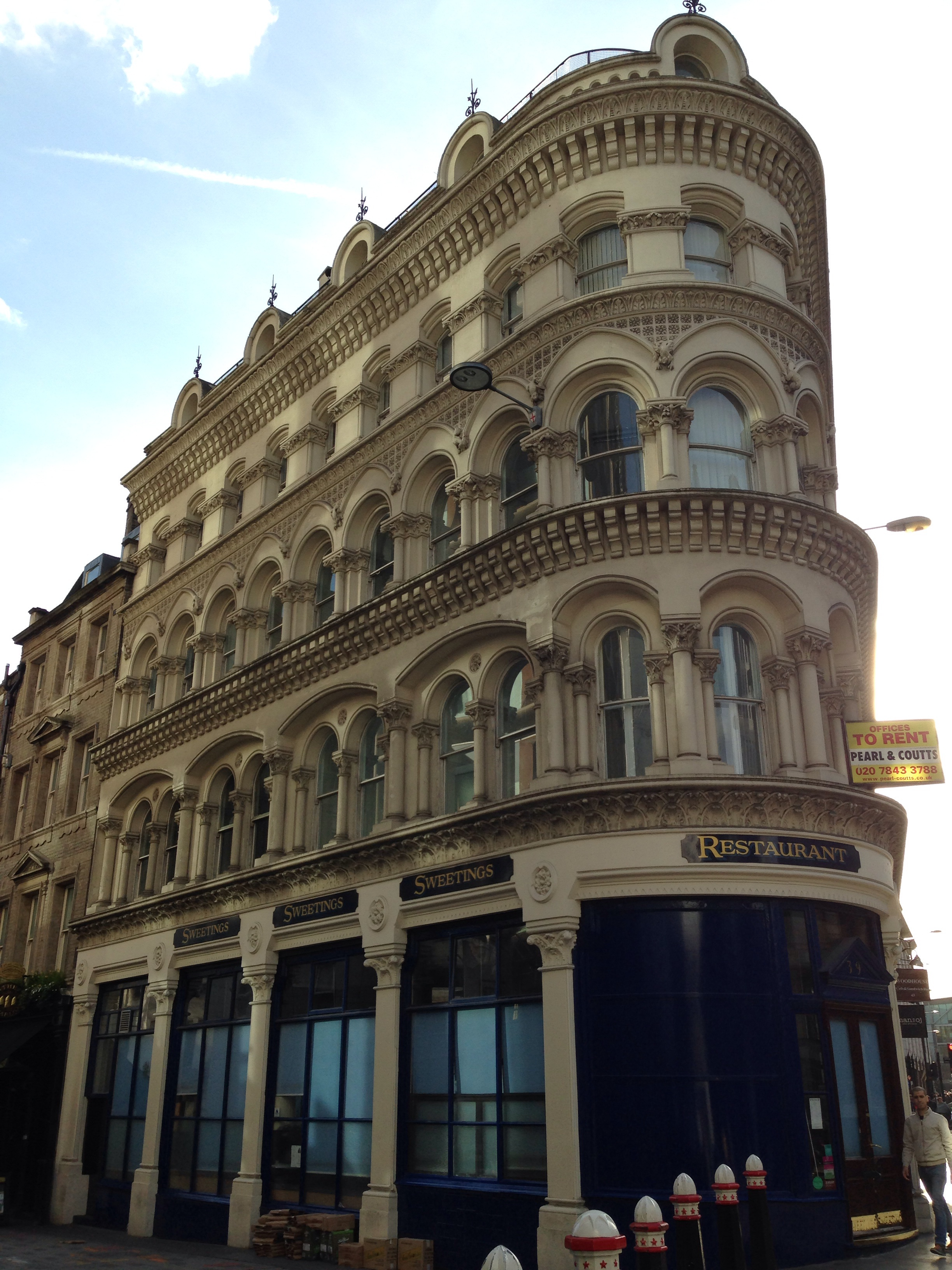
- The restaurant in 2016
- Interactive map of Sweetings

Restaurant information
- Established: 1889; 137 years ago
- Food type: Seafood
- Location: 39 Queen Victoria Street, London, EC4, England
- Coordinates: 51°30′44″N 0°05′33.78″W
- Reservations: No
- Website: sweetingsrestaurant.com

Designations

Listed Building – Grade II
- Official name: Albert Buildings
- Designated: 10 November 1977
- Reference no.: 1079140

Sweetings is a restaurant at 39 Queen Victoria Street in the City of London that specialises in traditional British seafood. It has been based at its present location since 1889. It is only open on weekday lunchtimes, and does not take reservations.

== History ==
Sweetings's first incarnation was as John S. Sweetings, Fish and Oyster Merchant in Lad Lane, Islington, in 1830. The Lad Lane shop continued to supply fish and game to hotels and restaurants The restaurant later occupied sites at 159 Cheapside and 17 Milk Street, advertised as "Very Superior Oyster Rooms". Fodor's wrote that "little seems to have changed at this time warp since the height of the British Empire". The French painter Henri de Toulouse-Lautrec patronised Sweetings in the 19th century. Sweetings has been owned by Richard Barfoot since 2001 who bought it from the widow of Graham Needham. Needham had owned it since 1980. Barfoot also supplies Sweeting's sustainably sourced seafood. According to Barfoot, Needham told him that the gangster George Francis once offered him £1m from a suitcase for Sweetings but Needham said, "I don't want to know and if you are going to trouble me like that you can get out now". Sweetings is located in the Grade II listed Albert Buildings at 39–53 Queen Victoria Street, built in 1871.

== Reviews ==
Condé Nast Traveler described Sweetings as:

"A seafood institution in the City...You won't find the most sophisticated cooking here, but the fish is very fresh and the pleasure is in feeling that you have stumbled on a slice of history. The waiters and waitresses are trapped behind wooden counters and serve only the eight or so customers in front of them. There is an etiquette about when you can talk to them but, after countless visits, I can't work it out."

Chef Fergus Henderson proposed to his wife, Margot, at Sweetings and wrote that their Black Velvet (Guinness and champagne cocktail) "puts you in the mood for romance". The black velvet was also praised by designer Phillipe Starck who felt that upon drinking it from a tankard "you are really in England".

== See also ==
- List of seafood restaurants
- Bentley's Oyster Bar and Grill
- Simpson's Tavern
- Oyster bar
