= The Bedford, Balham =

Pub and music venue in Balham, London

Coordinates: 51.442670°N 0.149281°W

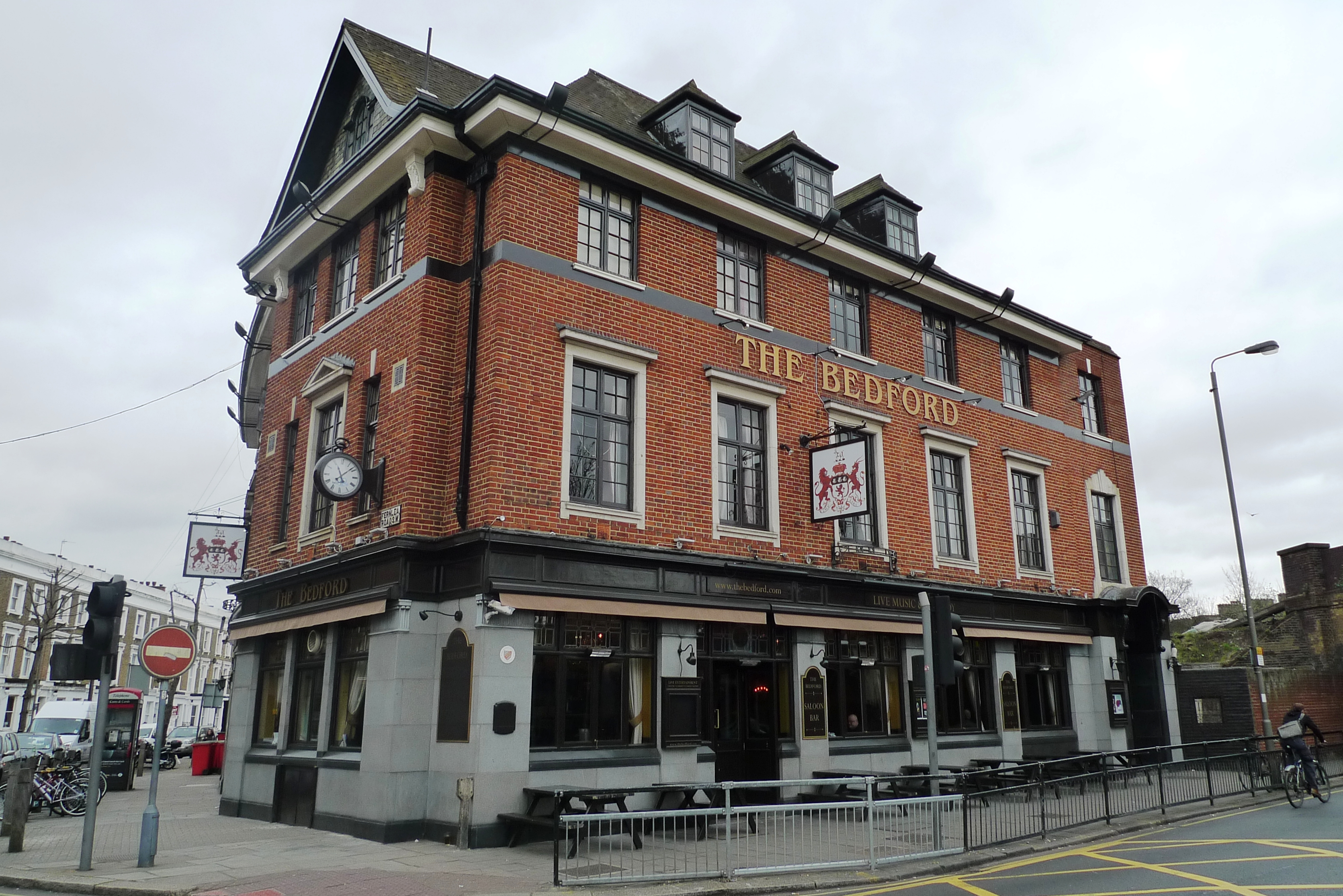
The Bedford in 2012

The Bedford, originally named The Bedford Hotel, is a Grade II listed public house at 77 Bedford Hill, Balham, London SW12 9HD.

== History ==
The original building (then named The Bedford Hotel) was built in the 1870s. In 1876, the pub building housed the coroner's inquest into the notorious unsolved murder of Charles Bravo, a resident and lawyer who was poisoned, possibly by his wife. It was rebuilt in about 1931 for the brewery Watney Combe & Reid, and designed by Alfred W. Blomfield, in a "neo-Georgian manner, with Arts and Crafts and Art Deco influences".

It was Grade II listed in 2015 by Historic England.

== Comedy and music venue ==
The Bedford hosts Banana Cabaret, where performers have included Stephen K Amos, Omid Djalili, Harry Hill, Eddie Izzard, Al Murray and Catherine Tate.

The pub is also well known as a music venue with Lola Young, Paolo Nutini, The Clash, U2 and Ed Sheeran performing early gigs here.

The Bedford has won various awards including the Publican Music Pub of the Year 2002; the Morning Advertiser Pub of the Year 2004; and the Evening Standard Pub of the Year 2002.
