= The French House, Soho =

Pub and dining room at 49 Dean Street, Soho, London

Coordinates: 51.5127°N 0.1318°W

The French House
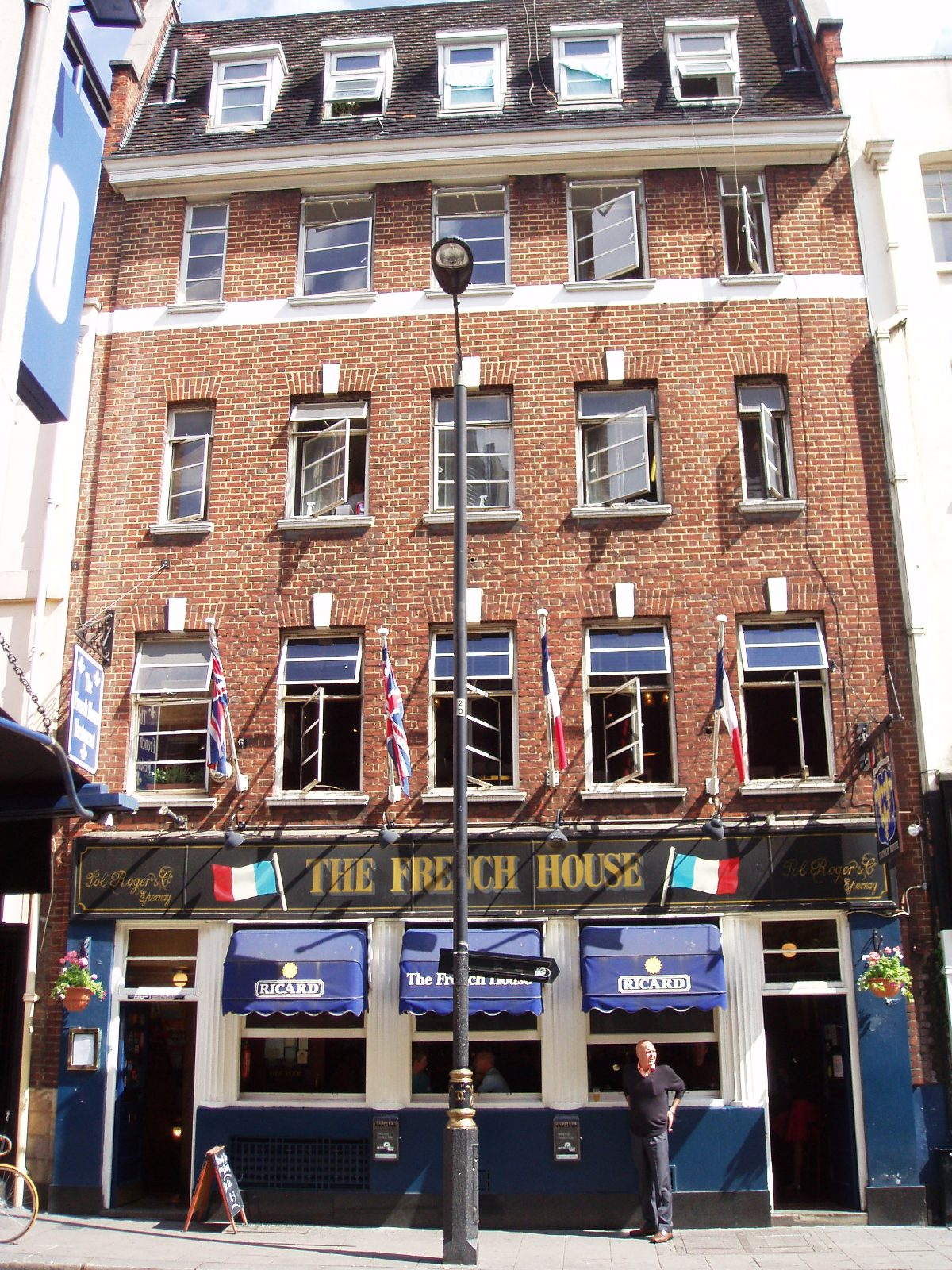
- Interactive map of The French House

Restaurant information
- Established: 1891 (as York Minster)
- Owner: Lesley Lewis
- Previous owners: Victor Berlemont; Gaston Berlemont
- Chef: Neil Borthwick
- Rating: (AA Rosette)
- Location: 49 Dean Street, Soho, London, UK
- Other information: No music, machines, television, mobile phones
- Website: frenchhousesoho.com

The French House is a pub and dining room at 49 Dean Street, Soho, London. It was previously known as the York Minster, but was informally called "the French pub" or "the French house" by its regulars.

== History ==
The pub was designed by Alfred W. Blomfield and opened by German publican Christian Schmitt in 1891 as York Minster. After Schmitt's death in 1911, his wife Bertha Margaretha Schmitt continued to run the pub until 1914.

With the outbreak of the First World War, Bertha Schmitt sold the pub to a Belgian, Victor Berlemont, who had moved to London in 1900. The bill of sale is still posted on a wall at the French. He was succeeded by his son Gaston Berlemont, who was born in the pub in 1914, and worked there until his retirement in 1989.

After the fall of France during the Second World War, General Charles de Gaulle escaped to London where he formed the Free French Forces. His speech rallying the French people, Appeal of 18 June, is said to have been written in the pub.

The French House has always been popular with artists and writers. Brendan Behan wrote large portions of The Quare Fellow there, and Dylan Thomas once left the manuscript of Under Milk Wood under his chair. Other regulars over the years have included Francis Bacon, Tom Baker, Daniel Farson, Lucian Freud, Slim Gaillard, Augustus John, Malcolm Lowry, and Sir John Mortimer.

Clive Jennings says of regular clientele such as Jeffrey Bernard that "the lethal triangle of The French, The Coach & Horses and The Colony were the staging points of the Dean Street shuffle, with occasional forays into other joints such as The Gargoyle or the Mandrake ... The Groucho or Blacks".

When still called York Minster, Raymond Postgate included it in the first volume of his Good Food Guide, 1951–52, with this entry: "Outside, this looks like an ordinary pub; inside it becomes the 'Maison Berlemont,' a French auberge with shelves full of Pernod, Byrrh, Amer Picon, Suze, Cap Corse, Mandarin, and so on. Upstairs there is a small room in which you will get the authentic, best cuisine bourgeoise: for an hour or so you are back in a small Paris restaurant, for a cost of about 5/6. Specialities: Navarin printaniere, Pied de porc, Tete de veau. Wines by the glass 2/-- to 2/6; bottles fairish price, e.g. White Bordeaux, 14/6; Cotes du Rhone, 15/--. (Recommended: Maurice Gorham; R. Postgate).

In 1984, the name was changed to "The French House" after the fire at York Minster. Contributions toward the restoration fund started arriving at the pub. Upon forwarding them, Gaston Berlemont found that the cathedral had been receiving deliveries of claret intended for him.

In recent years, landlady Lesley Lewis has encouraged Soho photographers to exhibit in the pub with regular contributions from John Claridge, William Corbett, Carla Borel and Peter Clark; and members of illustrators' collective, Le Gun. Claridge based his Soho Faces project at the French from 2004 to 2017. He said, "I decided to document the customers at The French in earnest. For me, it was the one place in Soho that still held its Bohemian character, where people truly chose to share time and conversation, and I became aware that many I had once chinked glasses with were no longer around."

The dining room at the French House was opened by Fergus and Margot Henderson in 1992. In 1994, Fergus left to establish his St. John restaurant in Smithfield. Margot continued to run the dining room for several years with Melanie Arnold. Anna Hansen worked under the Hendersons as head chef.

It sells more Ricard than anywhere else in Britain, and only serves beer in half-pints, except on 1 April, when a recent custom has been that Suggs serves the first pint of the day.
