= Potato (production company) =

British television production company

- Type: Subsidiary
- Industry: Television production
- Founded: March 2013; 13 years ago
- Defunct: January 2026; 8 months ago
- Fate: Folded into Bright Entertainment
- Successor: Bright Entertainment
- Key people: Phil Mount (creative director); Martin Scott (creative director)
- Products: Television
- Parent: ITV Studios
- Website: potatotv.co.uk

Potato was a British television production company. It was a subsidiary of ITV Studios, established in March 2013. The company produced TV shows such as The Chase, Ninja Warrior UK and CelebAbility.

In October 2025, ITV officially announced that Potato would cease to exist and be folded into a newly formed ITV Studios division. The label would also inherit the catalogue of its former sister company 12 Yard. The label was launched as Bright Entertainment in January 2026.

== List of TV Programming ==
Programme	Channel	Years	Notes
The Chase	ITV	2013–2026	Inherited from ITV Studios; Episodes from 2026 onwards are produced by Bright Entertainment
The Big Reunion	ITV2	2013–14	3 series
Four Weddings	Sky Living	2013	1 series
Britain's Secret Treasures	ITV	2013	2 series
Britain's Secret Homes	ITV	2014	1 series
I Never Knew That About Britain	ITV	2014	1 series
Fearne and McBusted	ITV2	2014	One-off special
Blue Go Mad in Ibiza	ITV2	2015	1 series
Autopsy: The Last Hours of...	Channel 5	2014–	3 series
Autopsy USA: The Last Hours of...	Reelz	2014–	7 series; American version of the show
Paddington 24/7	Channel 5	2016–	4 series
Breaking The Band	Reelz	2017–	4 series
Ninja Warrior UK	ITV	2015–2022	6 series
Bear Grylls Survival School	CITV	2016–	2 series
Paul O'Grady: The Sally Army & Me	BBC One	2016	1 series; joint production with Olga TV
Go for It	ITV	2016	1 series
My Favourite Sketch	Gold	2018	1 series
Devon and Cornwall Cops	ITV	2017	1 series
CelebAbility	ITV2	2017–2023	7 series
Ferne McCann: First Time Mum	ITVBe	2017–	6 series
Sam & Billie Faiers: The Mummy Diaries	ITVBe	2016–2021	8 series
Cannonball	ITV	2017	1 series
Straight Talking	Sky One	2019–	2 episodes
Winning Combination	ITV	2020–2021	2 series
Moneyball	ITV	2021–2023	2 series; joint production with Possessed
Sitting on a Fortune	ITV	2021–2023	2 series; joint production with Possessed
The Finish Line	BBC One	2023-2025	3 series and Christmas celebrity spin-off; joint production with Nice One Productions; Series 4 onwards is produced by Bright Entertainment
Celebrity Puzzling	5	2025	Revival of 12 Yard series Puzzling; joint production with Wheelhouse Studios; Series 2 onwards is produced by Bright Entertainment
Bullseye	ITV	2025	Second revival series, inherited from 12 Yard; Taken over by Bright Entertainment for its second series
