= Kevin Duala =

British actor and presenter (born 1964)

- Born: Kevin Francis Duala; 23 May 1964 (age 62); Liverpool, England
- Occupations: Actor; television presenter; radio presenter
- Years active: 1998–present
- Notable work: Blue's Clues; The One Show

Kevin Francis Duala (born 23 May 1964) is a British actor, television presenter and radio presenter. He is perhaps best known for hosting the United Kingdom's version of Blue's Clues (1998–2003) for Nick Jr.

== Early life ==
Duala was born in Liverpool and is a supporter of Liverpool Football Club. Duala's paternal grandfather, Thomas Duala, was Cameroonian. He was a very keen footballer before an injury ended his career and he went to drama school.

== Career ==
He began working as a stage actor and starred as Rocky 1 in Starlight Express. After that, he gained recognition as the host of the Blue's Clues British adaptation for Nick Jr., replacing Steve Burns and Donovan Patton who both hosted the original American version. Duala starred in 75 episodes of Blue's Clues across 6 series, in which all of them were adapted from the original American version of the show. His other television credits include Who Wants To Be a Great Cook?, Allsorts, and Modelmania. He was also a presenter on the "Prize Time", "Games Room", and "iPlay" strands on Challenge TV, and also presented Virtual World of Sport on The Computer Channel, Boiled Egg and Soldiers on Sky1 and the unit "Danger Detectors" in 1996 as part of BBC Schools programme Zig Zag.

Duala more recently co-presented on the Travel Channel on the shows Thomas Cook TV and Around the World for Sky. He also started fronting a financial property show named Property Boot Camp. Previously, he presented Spanish and European interactive language programmes for the BBC and many features for "Holiday" and "Holiday on a Shoestring" on BBC1, where he was the unofficial adventure sports expert presenting kayaking, bungee jumping, horse-riding, ice-skating, and mountain climbing for the show. He presented travel inserts for Thomas Cook TV and can be heard on the radio station BBC Radio 4 Extra where he co-hosts Big Toe, which is aimed at children and young teenagers, as well as numerous V/O commercials from the Army to Adidas. He was a presenter on the British channel Argos TV on channel number 642 until the channel was closed in May 2013.

Duala co-presented the BBC One daytime series Health: Truth or Scare with Angela Rippon, debunking the latest health headlines in the news in April 2017, which came back with a 2nd series in early 2018. He narrated A Matter of Life & Debt for BBC One in October 2017. Duala presented a new daytime series called Let's Get a Good Thing Going that was aired on BBC One in December 2017. He had also finished filming the second series of Health: Truth or Scare for BBC One, and started filming a BBC One daytime series celebrating charity work but also exposing charity villains, broadcast in June 2018.

He is also a regular reporter for BBC's The One Show and has also guest presented the show.

Duala will present the upcoming 15-part daytime Channel 4 series called Bidding Wars.

In 2022, Duala also hosted four episodes of Moneybags on Channel 4 when the usual presenter Craig Charles was unwell. Duala's episodes ended up being the final four episodes of the show, as the show was not renewed for a third series and its production company closed down.

In April 2024, Duala presented the Sunday morning breakfast show on BBC Radio Sussex and BBC Radio Surrey.

Since the summer of 2024, Duala has been presenting the breakfast show on BBC Radio Merseyside.

== Personal life ==
Thomas emigrated to Britain and married Ellen McGurty; they had two sons and four daughters.
