= Alfred W. Blomfield =

British architect

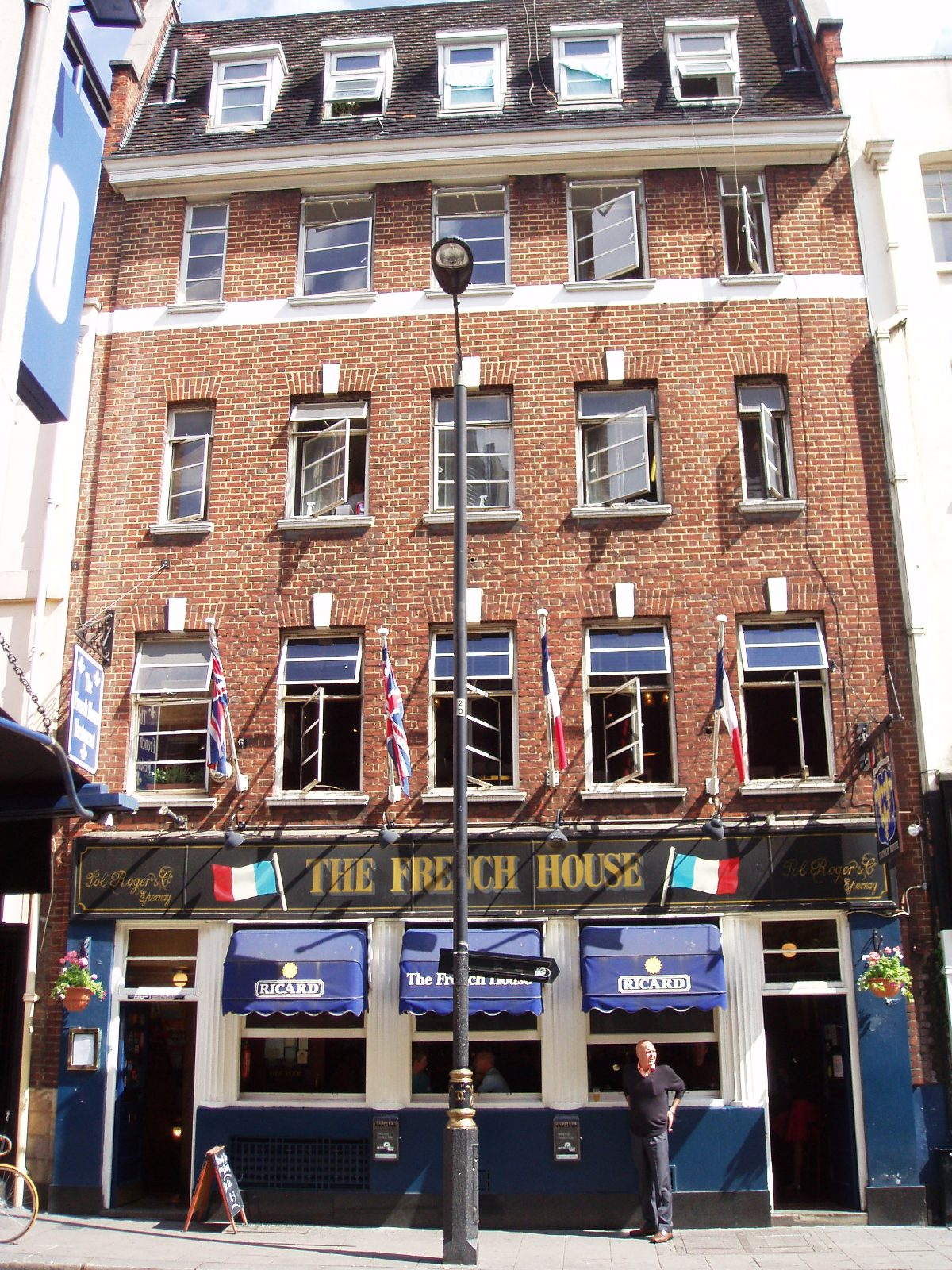
The French House, Soho

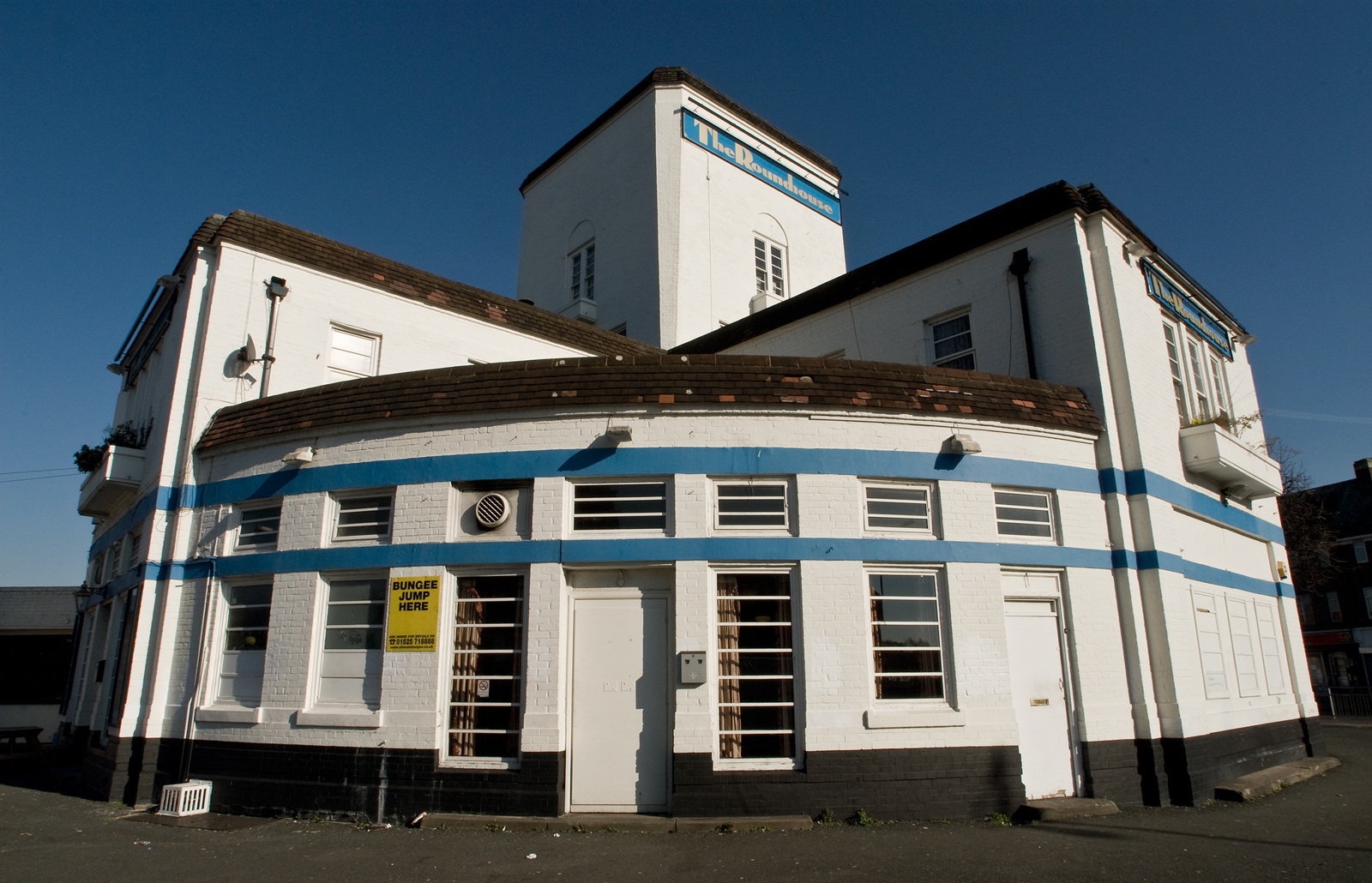
Dagenham Roundhouse

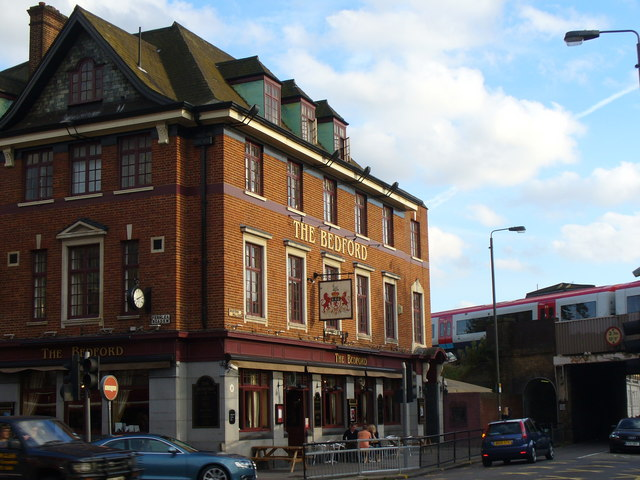
The Bedford, 2008

Alfred W. Blomfield (1879–1949) was a British architect, who worked as the in-house architect for the brewer Watney Combe & Reid from 1919 to 1940.

== Early life ==
Alfred W. Blomfield was born in 1879.

== Career ==
In about 1931, he designed The Bedford, Balham is a Grade II listed pub at 77 Bedford Hill, Balham, London, for Watney Combe & Reid, in a "neo-Georgian manner, with Arts and Crafts and Art Deco influences".

Blomfield was the architect of The French House, a pub at 49 Dean Street, Soho, London, built in 1937.

Blomfield was the architect of the Dagenham Roundhouse, built in 1936. Nikolaus Pevsner calls it a "highly unusual design".

His other designs included The Horns, Shoreditch (now a private club), the Mitre, Holland Park, the Mail Coach, Uxbridge Road (demolished), the Angel, Edmonton (demolished), and the World Turned Upside Down, Old Kent Road (now flats), all in London, and all featured in Architectural Design and Construction (1934).

== Death ==
Blomfield died in 1949.
