= Moneyball (game show) =

British game show

- Genre: Game show
- Created by: Glenn Hugill
- Presented by: Ian Wright
- Composer: Paul Farrer
- Country of origin: United Kingdom
- Original language: English
- No. of series: 2
- No. of episodes: 14

Production
- Production location: Dock10
- Running time: 60 minutes (inc. adverts)
- Production companies: Possessed and Potato

Original release
- Network: ITV1
- Release: 30 October 2021 – 26 August 2023

Moneyball is a British game show that aired on ITV1 from 30 October 2021 to 26 August 2023 and is hosted by Ian Wright. The primetime game show was commissioned in February 2021 with football pundit and former player Ian Wright as host. On 3 October 2023, it was announced that the show was axed after two series along with Sitting on a Fortune, hosted by Gary Lineker.

== Format ==
One contestant plays at a time, answering up to six questions and accumulating a bank of up to £250,000.

The centrepiece of the stage is a large screen framed by a U-shaped track. The screen is divided vertically into several zones based on the phase of the game. The contestant presses a button to set the initial height of the ball at the right side, after which it is released to roll back and forth on the track. The result is determined by the zone in which the ball stops; if it covers a boundary, the zone containing the majority of the ball takes precedence.

For each question, the contestant is given a category and shown two groups of three items each. They must pair the items up to form three responses that fit the category. (E.g. given the category "Bands" and the groups "Backstreet / Jonas / One" and "Direction / Boys / Brothers," pair them up as Backstreet Boys, Jonas Brothers, and One Direction.)

If the contestant responds correctly, they roll one ball in an effort to increase their bank. The screen displays one zone with the maximum value for that question, several others with smaller values, and two narrow red danger zones. If the ball lands in a money zone, that amount is added to the bank. The maximum value increases from one question to the next (£10,000, £20,000, £30,000, £40,000, £50,000, and £100,000). The screen displays a total of five money zones at the start of the game; for later questions, only four money zones are used in conjunction with wider danger zones.

If the contestant either responds incorrectly or lands a ball in a danger zone, no money is added to the bank for that turn and they must play a "Danger Board." The screen is divided into five zones of equal width, either blue "Safe" or red "Lose" zones. If the ball stops in "Safe," the game continues; if it stops in "Lose," the contestant is immediately dismissed with no winnings. The first Danger Board of the game has three "Safe" and two "Lose" zones, and each subsequent board changes one of the former to the latter type.

Once per game, the contestant may play a "Clue Ball" after giving a response. The screen is divided into three zones, one per pairing, and the pairing on which the ball stops is revealed as correct or incorrect. The contestant may use this information as they see fit before locking in their final response to the question.

After any turn, the contestant may choose to end the game and attempt to cash out. The screen is divided into five zones, two wide gold ones alternating with three narrower red "Lose" zones. The contestant wins the entire bank if the ball stops on a gold zone, or nothing if it stops on "Lose."

== Transmissions ==
Series	Start date	End date	Episodes	On ITVX
1	30 October 2021	18 December 2021	8	2021-2026
2	22 July 2023	26 August 2023	6	2023-

== Reception ==
Hollie Richardson of The Guardian praised Wright's abilities as a host and how the nature of the show enabled contestants to risk large amounts of money. In the same publication, Joel Golby compared Moneyball to 2 other new game shows: ITV's Sitting on a Fortune hosted by fellow ex-footballer Gary Lineker and Channel 4's Moneybags fronted by the actor and DJ Craig Charles. In Golby's eyes, Wright and Charles were skilled hosts while Lineker was not, but the questions were better on Moneybags than Moneyball.

In the Belfast Telegraph, Billy Weir criticised the trend of new game shows being fronted by ex-footballers, citing Wright, Lineker and Alex Scott of The Tournament. Liverpool Echo writer Kate Lally found that audience on Twitter complained that the questions on Moneyball were too easy.
