= Albert Buildings =

Building in London, England

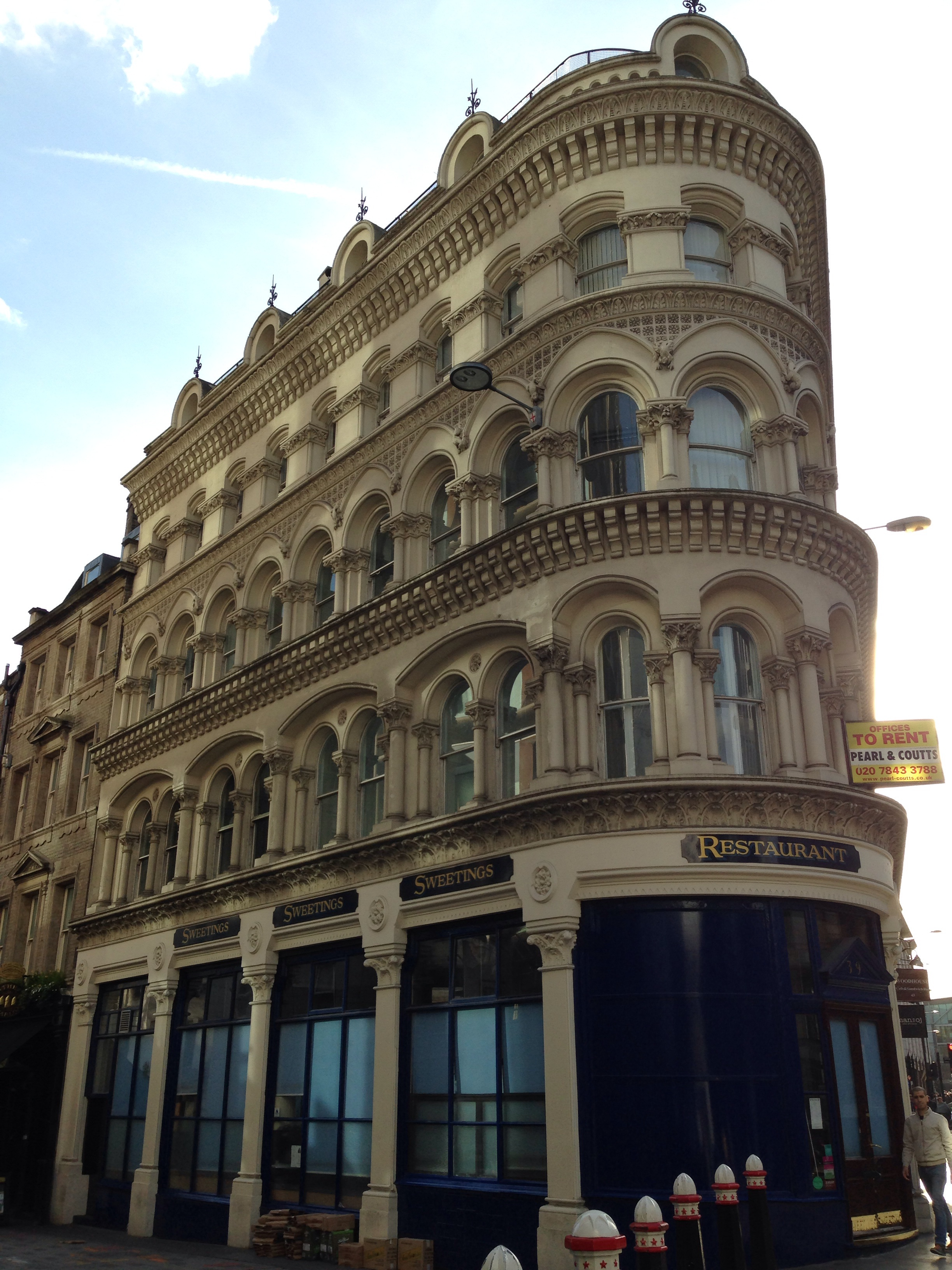
- Albert Buildings

General information
- Type: Office
- Architectural style: Gothic Revival
- Location: London, England
- Coordinates: 51°30′45″N 0°05′35″W
- Completed: 1871

Design and construction
- Architect: John Whichcord Jr.

Listed Building – Grade II
- Official name: Albert Buildings
- Designated: 10 November 1977
- Reference no.: 1079140

The Albert Buildings is a Grade II listed Victorian office block that stands on the corner of Queen Victoria Street and Cannon Street in the City of London.

== History ==
The block was constructed in 1871 following the establishment of Queen Victoria Street, a cut-through from the Victoria Embankment to the Bank of England. It was designed by Frederic J Ward.

The restaurant Sweetings, sometimes claimed to be the oldest fish and oyster shop in London, have their premises in the building at 39 Queen Victoria Street. The restaurant moved from their original location in Islington in 1889.

In 2026, Emrys Architects were given permission to redevelop the block while maintaining its historic facade.

== Design ==
The building occupies a triangular site on Queen Victoria Street. Built of painted stone, it employs a Gothic Revival style variously described as French, English and Italian in its inspiration. The facades present stacked arcades, banded with multiple cornices and corbel tables.

The Building News described it as "‘the sort of pretentious Mediaeval against which the “Queen Anne” revival is intended as a protest". The building was however awarded Grade II listed status in 1977 for its architectural interest.
