= Winning Combination =

2020 British game show

- Genre: Game show
- Presented by: Omid Djalili
- Country of origin: United Kingdom
- Original language: English
- No. of series: 2
- No. of episodes: 50

Production
- Running time: 60 minutes (inc. adverts)
- Production company: Potato

Original release
- Network: ITV
- Release: 16 November 2020 – 5 November 2021

Winning Combination is a British game show that aired on ITV from 16 November 2020 to 5 November 2021, hosted by Omid Djalili.

== Format ==
Nine contestants take part in the game, each assigned a different number from 1 to 9. They compete to answer a series of general knowledge questions and earn one of four slots in the final, using their numbers to set the day's jackpot and then trying to win equal shares of it.

=== Qualifiers ===
In the first series, the host asks a toss-up question on the buzzer, open to all. The first contestant to buzz-in and respond correctly is then shown a category and six possible answers, two of which are correct. If the contestant selects both correct answers, they qualify for a Battle and sit out the rest of the round; if not, the host asks a new toss-up. If a contestant responds incorrectly to a toss-up, the host asks a new one and they are frozen out of it. The process continues until five contestants have qualified.

In the second series, the host gives a category and reveals nine possible answers, one at a time; at least two of them are correct. The first contestant to buzz-in and give two correct answers qualifies for the Battle, while a miss freezes them out and allows others to buzz-in once the next answer has been revealed.

=== Battles ===
The host asks quick-fire toss-up questions for two minutes, open to all five contestants, and the clock starts as soon as he begins to read the first question. The contestants each begin with four points; a correct response awards the contestant one point and allows them to deduct one from the opponent of their choice, while a miss deducts one point. Scores cannot go below zero or above nine. When time runs out, the contestant with the highest score advances to the Final and may place their number in any open slot on the board (thousands, hundreds, tens, units) to determine the day's jackpot. In case of a tie for high score, one more question is asked to decide the winner.

After each of the first three Battles, the four defeated contestants return to the pool and a new qualifier is played. After the fourth Battle, both the defeated contestants and the one who did not qualify for it are eliminated from the game, and the Final is then played.

=== Final ===
The winners of the four Battles stand in the same order as the positions of their numbers in the jackpot. The "units" contestant is given 30 seconds to answer enough questions to match their number; each correct answer adds five seconds to the clock, but it cannot go above 30. As in the Battles, the clock starts once the host begins to read the first question. If the contestant meets their goal, the clock stops and the "tens" contestant must do the same using the remaining time, followed by the "hundreds" and "thousands" contestants. All four contestants win equal shares of the jackpot if they each meet their target without running out of time, or nothing if the clock reaches zero at any point.

The maximum possible jackpot is £9,876, which would give each of the final four contestants a £2,469 share if won.

== Transmissions ==
Series	Start date	End date	Episodes
1	16 November 2020	11 December 2020	20
2	27 September 2021	5 November 2021	30
