= Dagenham Roundhouse =

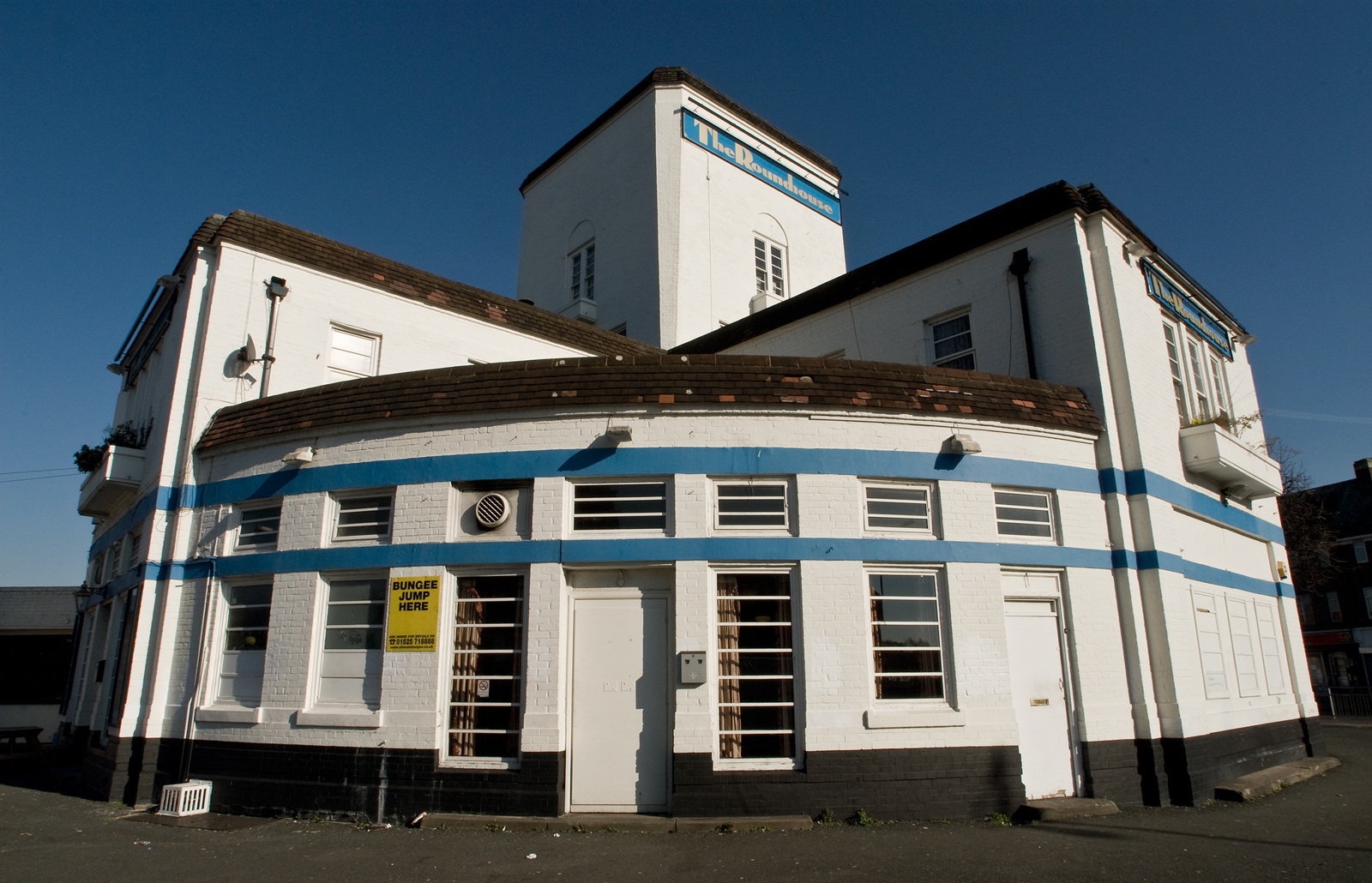
- The Roundhouse, September 2008
- Interactive map of the Dagenham Roundhouse area
- Alternative names: The Village Blues Club

General information
- Type: Public house
- Location: Dagenham, London, England, Lodge Avenue, Dagenham, RM8 2HY
- Coordinates: 51.541584°N 0.113259°E
- Inaugurated: 1969
- Landlord: Kim Sullivan

Dimensions
- Diameter: 50 ft

Design and construction
- Architect: Alfred W. Blomfield

Dagenham Roundhouse is a pub and music venue located in Dagenham, London, England. The pub was built in 1936 and in 1969 the "Village Blues Club" was established there, and from then until 1975 it was considered east London's premier rock music venue.

In 2007, filmmakers Ken Gascoigne and "H" Curran produced a documentary about the club in which they interviewed some of the artists who appeared there in its heyday, including Mick Box of Uriah Heep, Brian May of Queen, the Roundhouse Promoter Andy Townsend, and various local residents, who recalled memories of the club.

Behind the pub, in the location of the old car park, is a road called Bragg Close. This is named after the singer and poet Billy Bragg, whose family has lived in the area for over a century.

Bragg opened the street on 24 August 1999, dedicating it to his own brother, and paying tribute to Ben Tillett, the founder of the dockworkers union. It consists of 12 housing association homes.

== Location ==
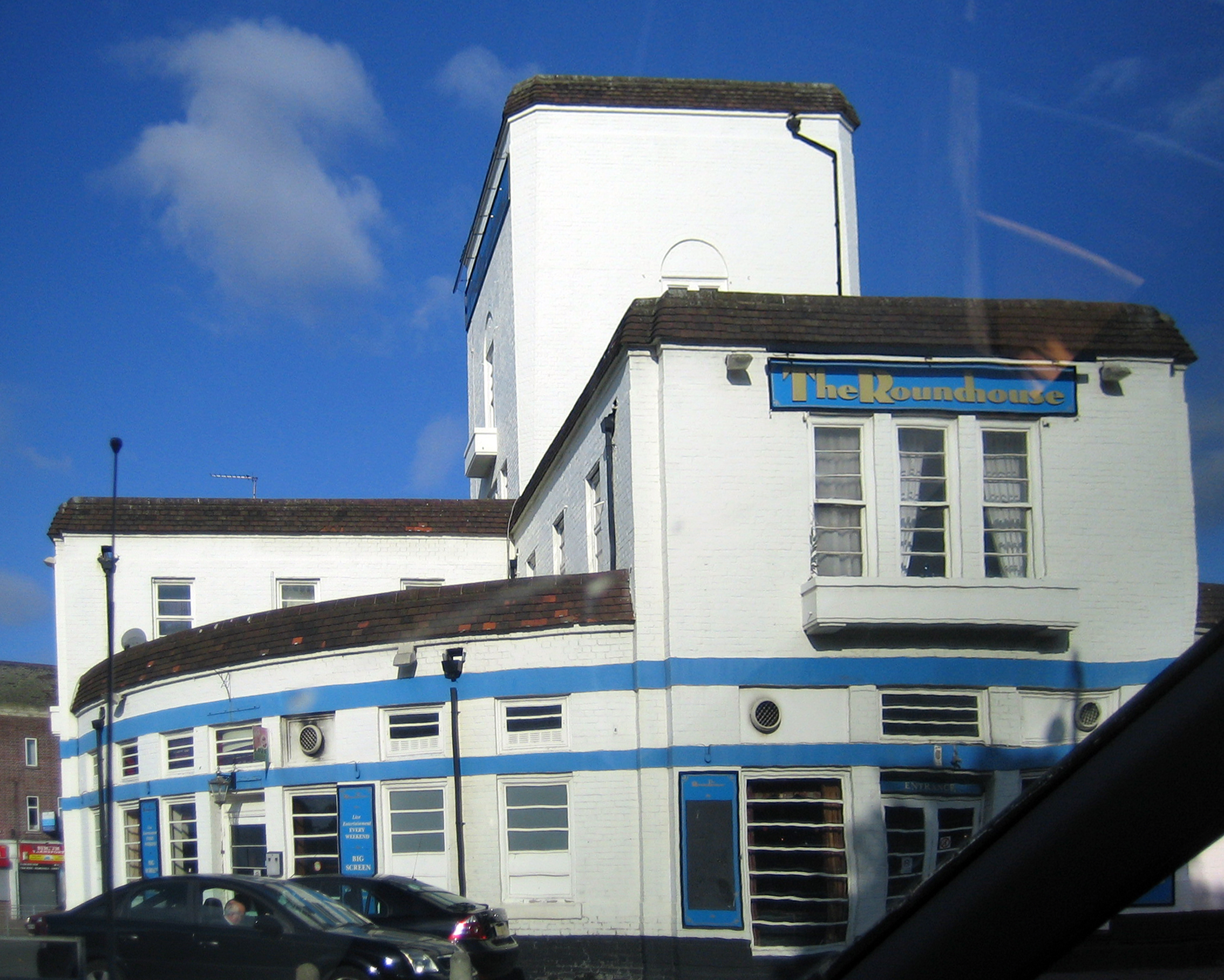
Side view

It is located in the triangular segment formed by the junction of Porters Avenue (the A1153) and Lodge Avenue, and is adjacent to a boating lake and Mayesbrook park, the home of Barking & East Ham United F.C. The main circular building is approximately 50 feet (15 m) in diameter, but the function room, which was used for concerts and bingo, is a long, low ceilinged, rectangular wing, extending along Lodge Avenue. It lies roughly halfway between Upney and Becontree stations on the District line in zone 5. The Roundhouse is a stop on London Buses route 368.

== Acts ==
Acts that have appeared there include Led Zeppelin, Genesis, Thin Lizzy, Rory Gallagher, Pink Floyd

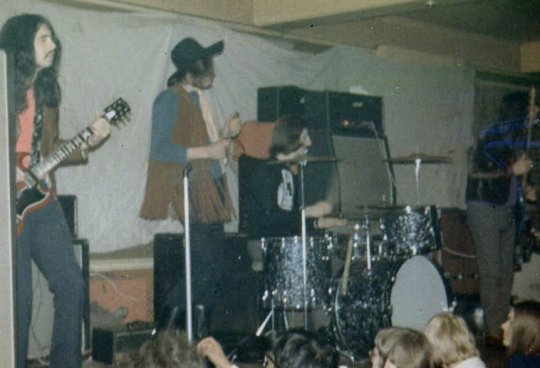
Killing Floor performing at the Roundhouse, 1971

Handbill from 1975

== Reunion ==
A Facebook nostalgia group was started for the Village Blues Club in 2008. It now has some 100+ members, and a private reunion was held in May 2012, back in the Roundhouse where it all started. The band who played there the most in its heyday, a total of 13 times, Stray, headlined the gig.

A second reunion was held in May 2013, headlined by The Big Blues Jam (Jon Amor/Pete Gage/Mark Barrett/Dave Doherty & Friends), with support by Jon Amor. (Reunion II).

A third reunion was held in September 2013, with The Pink Torpedoes (Pete Gage/Paul Hartshorn/Pete Lowrey/Dave Raeburn). (Reunion III).

The fourth reunion took place in May 2014, once again starring Stray (Reunion IV).

Reunion V was in September 2014, again providing a link back to the original Roundhouse in that it starred Son of Man, which included George Jones, son of the original Man's Micky Jones, on guitar.

Reunion VI in May 2015 starred Martin Turner, playing the music of Wishbone Ash.

== Public house ==
The Campaign For Real Ale (Camra) has included The Roundhouse in its database of heritage pubs in recognition of its historic interior. The entry reads:

This daunting pub near the western edge of the vast Becontree Estate was built in 1936. It has a most unusual design, the work of specialist pub architect, Alfred W. Blomfield. As the name suggests the ground plan is round and on top of this there sits a T-shaped upper storey with a bulky square tower in the centre. This is a classic example of the large inter-war pubs that went up on housing estates to serve great swathes of housing and provide extensive facilities – and not just for alcohol drinkers. This one had a tea room and a wing containing an indoor bowling green. Blomfield also provided a huge oval lounge at the rear and this still survives but with a cut-through to the adjacent room at the front. This in turn is separated by a wall from the rest of the pub where one can still get some sense of the original spaces. The fittings, apart from some sub-Art Deco wall panelling, are largely replacements.

In 2005, the pub was called a "serious cause for concern".

The licensee in 2008 was Kim Sullivan. Kim was still the licensee in 2014.
