= Margot Henderson =

New Zealand chef

Margot Henderson OBE (born 1964) is a New Zealand chef, caterer, and cookery writer who lives in the United Kingdom. With Melanie Arnold, Henderson runs the caterers Arnold & Henderson, and is the co-patron and chef of Rochelle Canteen in Shoreditch. She is married to fellow chef and restaurateur Fergus Henderson; the couple have three children.

== Life and career ==
Henderson was born in Wellington, New Zealand. Her mother was a journalist and food writer, a devotee of the teachings of the American nutritionist Gayelord Hauser. As a child, the first recipe Henderson made was a ginger crunch from New Zealand's classic Edmonds Cookery Book. She later cooked garden snails with breadcrumbs for her parents' dinner parties. She moved to the United Kingdom aged 20. She dropped out of an English degree at university and worked at a Mexican cantina to save money to come to London, having fallen in love and been obsessed by The Face magazine. Henderson split her work life between England and Australia for a few years, working with the Australian chef Stephanie Alexander. Henderson has worked at several notable restaurants in London; her career was described by journalist Rachel Cooke as "a CV that pretty much tells the story of all that was hip and delicious in 90s London". Initially working at the Notting Hill establishments 192 and First Floor, she later moved to the Quality Chop House in Farringdon and The Eagle gastropub in Clerkenwell.

At a Sunday lunch at The Eagle she met fellow chef Fergus Henderson. Fergus proposed to Margot at the City of London seafood restaurant Sweetings; the couple made a cassoulet for 300 people to eat at their wedding. The couple have three children. Fergus and Margot opened the French House Dining Room at Soho's French House in 1992, though Fergus would leave in 1994 to establish his St. John restaurant in Smithfield. Margot felt this led to "years of bitterness, which I might just be coming out of". Fergus was replaced as Margot's business partner by Melanie Arnold. The pair established the caterers Arnold & Henderson and founded the Rochelle Canteen in Bethnal Green in the early 2000s. The canteen also serves as a base for their catering company. Rochelle Canteen is based in the former bicycle sheds of a Victorian school, which has been converted into artist's studios. The menu changes daily and serves seasonal British food. In an interview with Something Curated, Margot Henderson said, "All our seafood comes from British waters – we get our fish from Essex. They call up on the day that the boats come in and we get it that night and can serve it the next day."

Henderson published a cookery book, You're All Invited: Margot's Recipes for Entertaining, in 2012. She initially found it difficult to write but later felt that "I shouldn't have worried. I should have just done it. But I just kept putting it off, and then I would lose the thread." The book was later described by Cooke as not "desperately trying to take up a position. There are no earnest lectures about seasonality, no dreary outbreaks of solidarity with hard-pressed working women. Her introductions to each recipe are witty, but minimalist."

Henderson's favourite cookery writers are Diana Henry and Simon Hopkinson. Henderson was the subject of a short film made by Vice in 2015.

She was appointed Officer of the Order of the British Empire (OBE) in the 2021 New Year Honours for services to the culinary arts.

== Publications ==
- 2012: You're All Invited: Margot's Recipes for Entertaining (Penguin Fig Tree) ISBN 9781905490608
