= John Claridge =

British photographer (1944–2026)

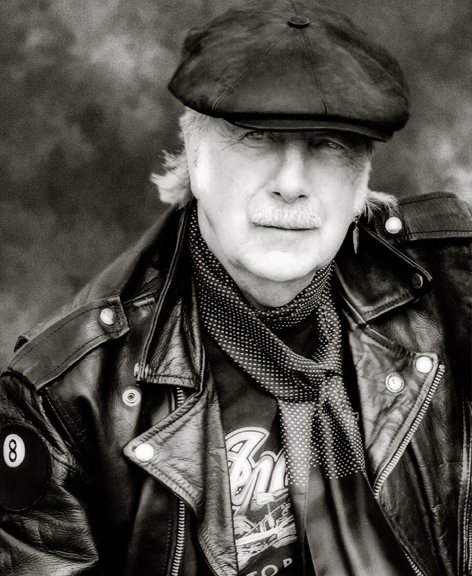

John Edward Claridge (15 August 1944 – 24 May 2026) was a British photographer, known for his work in advertising, black and white portraits in Soho and street photographs in the East End of London.

== Early life ==
John Edward Claridge was born in Plaistow, Essex on 15 August 1944. His father worked in the docks, sold alcohol in New York during Prohibition and was a bare-knuckle boxer in the dock areas in both New York and the East End; Claridge also boxed. His mother was a shirt machinist working in Roman Road, Bow. Aged 8, Claridge saw a plastic camera at an East End funfair and had to have it. A few years later, he saved up enough money from his paper round in the London docks to buy a proper camera to record the world he was growing up in. From the age of 13, he started to buy jazz records, and it remained a lifetime obsession.

He had no formal training as a photographer but aged 15, began working for McCann Erickson advertising agency in their Photography and Design department. He worked under Robert Brownjohn, the art director known for his James Bond title sequences, who encouraged him to have his first exhibition, of photographs on the East End, aged 16.

== Career ==
In 1961 he left to become assistant to David Montgomery and in 1964 he opened his own studio in London. His first commissions were for Management Today, Queen, Town, Harper’s, and Nova magazines. He went on to work for many types of companies, especially tourist boards and car companies. From 1976 to 1989, Claridge lived and had his darkroom in a flat on Frith Street, Soho, above Ronnie Scott’s Jazz Club. He shot the 1993 Pirelli Calendar.

In April 2018, The Association of Photographers included Claridge in its 50th anniversary exhibition of some the world's most respected photographers. His work is held in the collections of The Arts Council of Great Britain, the Victoria & Albert Museum, the National Portrait Gallery and The Museum of Modern Art. He won over 700 awards for his editorial and advertising work in the 1960s.

== Projects and series ==
Claridge began taking photos of the East End as a teenager in the 1960s. The series was published as a book (East End) in 2016.

He began taking the jazz portraits series while living in his flat above Ronnie Scott's. In 1986, he photographed Chet Baker in the club:

Chet Baker came in one night in 1986, and I asked him if I could do a couple of shots before he went on. I said: 'I’ve got to tell you, when I was 13, I bought the Chet Baker Quartet record with Winter Wonderland on it. Russ Freeman was the pianist … ' And Chet said, 'Yeah, he was, in 1953.' He just stopped and stared, going back through his memory. And that’s when I took the picture.

Having grown up in a boxing family, Claridge has taken over 100 photographs of members of the London Ex-Boxer's Association, which were serially published by The Gentle Author, 2012–2013.

Of Claridge's Soho Faces project (2004–2017) he said, "I decided to document the customers at The French in earnest. For me, it was the one place in Soho that still held its Bohemian character, where people truly chose to share time and conversation, and I became aware that many I had once chinked glasses with were no longer around."

Claridge took over 500 portraits for Soho Faces and he is considered to have taken more photographs of the East End than any other photographer.

== Death ==
Claridge died on 24 May 2026, aged 81.

== Publications ==
=== Publications by Claridge ===
- South America. London: Glimpseland, 1982.
- One Hundred Photographs. London: Glimpseland, 1988.
- Seven Days in Havana. London: Glimpseland, 2000.
- 8 Hours. London: Glimpseland, 2002.
- In Shadows I Dream. London: Glimpseland, 2003.
- Another Time Another Place. Southport: Café Royal, 2012.
- Along the Thames. Southport: Café Royal, 2012.
- The Salvation Army. Southport: Café Royal, 2012.
- Peopled Streets. Southport: Café Royal, 2012.
- East End Graphics. Southport: Café Royal, 2012.
- Monoliths, Sculptures, Fun & Death. Southport: Café Royal, 2012.
- Coal Miners 1971. Southport: Café Royal, 2013.
- Afternoons Well Spent. Southport: Café Royal, 2013.
- Scottish Landscapes. Southport: Café Royal, 2013.
- The Gorbals. Southport: Café Royal, 2013.
- The Industrial Past. Southport: Café Royal, 2013.
- Vintage London. Southport: Café Royal, 2013.
- Ribble Steam Railway. Southport: Café Royal, 2013.
- Israel 1967. Southport: Café Royal, 2014.
- New York in the 70s. Southport: Café Royal, 2014.
- India in the 70s. Southport: Café Royal, 2016.
- Whitechapel Bell Foundry. Southport: Café Royal, 2016.
- East End. London: Spitalfields Life, 2016.
- The Miners 1971. London: Lizards Eye, (Note: Lizards Eye is Claridge's imprint; the books can be found here within his website.) 2017.
- Warriors Heroes Boxers. London: Lizards Eye, 2018.
- From the Market. London: Lizards Eye, 2018.
- A Vision of India. London: Lizards Eye, 2018.
- Tools & Bones. London: Lizards Eye, 2018.
- Objects. London: Lizards Eye, 2018.
- Along the Thames. London: Lizards Eye, 2018.
- Tunisia. London: Lizards Eye, 2018.
- Paris 60's & 70's. London: Lizards Eye, 2018.
- Paris Graphics. London: Lizards Eye, 2018.
- Lost Jazz. London: Lizards Eye, 2018.
- Trains Autos. London: Lizards Eye, 2018.
- Oradour. London: Lizards Eye, 2018.
- No Sun in Venice. London: Lizards Eye, 2018.
- A Meander New York. London: Lizards Eye, 2018.
- A Western Trail. London: Lizards Eye, 2018.
- Signs & Graphics. London: Lizards Eye, 2018.

=== Publications with contributions by Claridge ===
- The Gentle Author's London Album. London: Spitalfields Life, 2013 (Boxers series)
