= Sitting on a Fortune =

British game show (2021–2023)

- Genre: Game show
- Presented by: Gary Lineker
- Country of origin: United Kingdom
- Original language: English
- No. of series: 2
- No. of episodes: 13

Production
- Production location: Dock10
- Running time: 60 minutes (inc. adverts)
- Production companies: Possessed and Potato

Original release
- Network: ITV1
- Release: 7 November 2021 – 9 July 2023

Sitting on a Fortune is a British game show that aired on ITV1 from 7 November 2021 to 9 July 2023 and is hosted by Gary Lineker. The show was commissioned in July 2021 with football presenter and former player Gary Lineker as host. It is produced at Dock10 by Possessed and Potato. In October 2023, it was announced that the show was axed after two series along with Ian Wright's Moneyball.

== Format ==
On each episode, six contestants compete for a chance to win up to £100,000. They sit in a line of six chairs; the one at the front of the line is coloured gold and designated as the "Money Chair," while the one at the rear is coloured red.

All questions asked during the game have four answer options, one of which is correct. Only the contestant in the Money Chair at any given moment may answer a question; a correct answer allows them to stay there, but a miss sends them to the end of the line and allows everyone else to move up one place.

=== Rounds 1 and 2 ===
At the start of Round 1, the contestants choose their initial seat positions based on the result of a random draw held before the show. After a total of three correct answers have been given, the contestant in the Money Chair advances to the final, while the one in the red chair is eliminated with no winnings.

Round 2 is played in the same fashion, but with two of the middle chairs removed. The four remaining contestants choose their initial positions based on their seating order at the end of Round 1.

=== Round 3 ===
The two middle chairs are removed, leaving only the red one and the Money Chair, and the two remaining contestants choose their initial positions as in Round 2. During this round, the contestant in the red chair selects the category for each question from two options. After the second correct answer is given, the contestant in the Money Chair advances to the final.

=== Final ===
A second red chair is added behind the Money Chair, and the three qualifying contestants choose their initial positions in the order that they won their rounds. A total of seven questions are asked in this round, with the contestant in the rear choosing the category for each as in Round 3.

The jackpot begins at £100,000, but decreases by £10,000 for every incorrect answer. The contestant in the Money Chair may ask for help from either or both of the others at any time, and may heed or ignore their advice as they see fit.

A miss on the final question allows the next contestant in line a chance to answer it after moving up to the Money Chair. The first one to give the correct answer wins the entire jackpot, while the other two leave with nothing. If all three contestants miss this question, no one wins any money.

The lowest potential jackpot is £20,000, attained if the contestants miss the first six questions in the final and then give two incorrect answers for the seventh. The £100,000 top prize requires the contestant initially in the Money Chair to answer every question correctly.

== Transmissions ==
Series	Start date	End date	Episodes	On ITVX
1	7 November 2021	19 December 2021	7	2021-2026
2	18 May 2023	9 July 2023	6	2023-

== Reception ==
Joel Golby of The Guardian found Lineker to be a poor presenter with little interest in the contestants, contrasting with fellow ex-footballer Ian Wright on another new ITV game show, Moneyball. Billy Weir of The Belfast Telegraph criticised footballers being game show hosts, naming Lineker, Wright and Alex Scott of The Tournament.
