= Omid Djalili =

British stand-up comedian and actor (born 1965)

- امید جلیلی
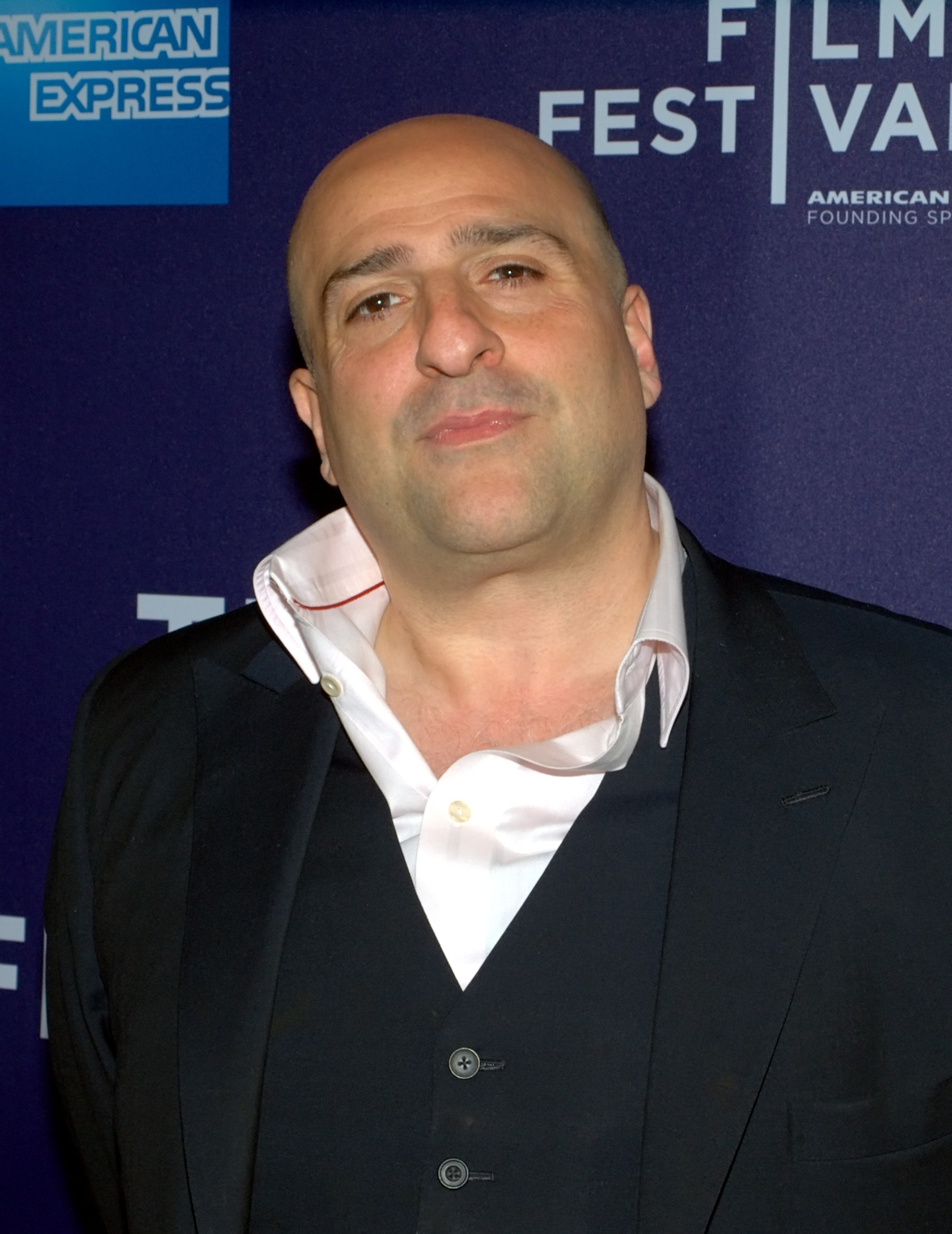
- Djalili at the 2010 Tribeca Film Festival
- Born: 30 September 1965 (age 61); Kensington, London, England
- Education: Ulster University (BA)
- Occupations: Comedian; actor; writer
- Spouse: Annabel Knight (m. 1992)
- Children: 3

Comedy career
- Years active: 1991–present
- Medium: Film; stand-up; television
- Subjects: Religion; race; culture; stereotypes; human interaction

Omid Djalili (born 30 September 1965) is a British comedian, actor, and writer of Iranian descent. He began his career at the 1995 Edinburgh Festival Fringe and has gone on to become a touring comedian with a substantial list of film and television appearances.

== Early life and education ==
Djalili was born on 30 September 1965 in St Mary Abbots Hospital in Kensington, London, to Iranian Baháʼí parents Ahmad and Parvaneh Djalili. His parents emigrated from Tehran to London in 1958. He has a brother and sister. His mother was a dressmaker who at one point assisted Iranian singer Googoosh. His father was a liaison officer at the Iranian embassy in which he would provide medical assistance. He was also a photographer whose pictures ended up in the newspaper Kayhan. He attended Holland Park School where he failed A-level exams six times. He subsequently faked his results to gain entry to Ulster University in Coleraine, Northern Ireland, studying English and theatre studies having been turned down by 16 drama schools. Djalili cited Jack Lemmon, Dustin Hoffman, Meryl Streep, Robert De Niro, Christopher Walken and Julia Roberts as influences.

== Comedy career ==
Djalili begins his 2014 autobiography, Hopeful, with mention of his success at the Edinburgh Festival Fringe in 1995 with "Short, Fat Kebab Shop Owner's Son." He followed that up with "The Arab and the Jew," which he performed with Jewish comedian Ivor Dembina in 1996.

Djalili took part in a show for Comic Relief after the 2004 Indian Ocean earthquake and tsunami and also in 2005 he appeared on the British TV show Top Gear as a celebrity driver. The same year he broke Edinburgh Festival box office records with over 16,500 ticket sales.

In 2006, Sky Television chose him to be the face of their Saturday night film premières, and he also announced a new tour of the UK called 'No Agenda', from January 2007 until March 2007, covering 23 different dates. The No Agenda tour DVD was released in late 2007.

On 26 October 2007, he guest-presented the BBC political quiz show Have I Got News for You. The Omid Djalili Show started on BBC1 on 17 November 2007. The series was a mix of sketches and stand-up material. A second series was recorded in late 2008 and broadcast on BBC 1 on 20 April 2009. He performed on We Are Most Amused on ITV1 to mark Prince Charles's 60th birthday in 2008 and on We Are Most Amused and Amazed to mark his 70th birthday in 2018.

In 2023, Djalili was due to appear in the Omid Djalili and Friends show in Market Drayton at the Festival Drayton Centre. Djalili did not appear in the tour due to threats against Djalili relating to the Gaza war.

== Acting career ==
Djalili has appeared in a number of films, most notably Gladiator, The Mummy, Mean Machine, The World Is Not Enough, Alien Autopsy, Spy Game, Sky Captain and the World of Tomorrow, Grow Your Own, Notting Hill, Mr Nice, Pirates of the Caribbean: At World's End, Sex and the City 2 and provides his voice in Over the Hedge. and In Your Dreams

He has observed that he usually appears as a generic Middle Eastern background character in many of these films, often commenting that he appears in the James Bond film as the "Second Azerbaijani oil pipe attendant". He appeared as Nasim in 22 episodes of the U.S. sitcom Whoopi, starring Whoopi Goldberg, and picked up an international film award for Best Supporting Actor in Casanova, starring alongside Heath Ledger and Jeremy Irons.

On 12 February 2009, producer Cameron Mackintosh announced that Djalili would appear as the second Fagin in the new West End production of Oliver! at the Theatre Royal, Drury Lane, London. Omid took over from Rowan Atkinson, who had been contracted until 18 July 2009.

In 2009, Djalili became the voice of Yusuf Amir in the popular gaming series Grand Theft Auto. He took up the role in the Grand Theft Auto: The Ballad of Gay Tony spin-off game. In 2010, he starred in the David Baddiel-scripted film The Infidel.

In 2017, Djalili appeared as Tevye in Fiddler on the Roof at the Chichester Festival Theatre.

In 2023, Djalili reprised his role as the voice of Yusuf Amir in the fifth installment of the popular gaming series Grand Theft Auto. He reprised the role as part of the Grand Theft Auto Online DLC, The Chop Shop.

In 2026, Djalili will appear as King Herod in Jesus Christ Superstar at the Theatre Royal, Drury Lane in the West End from 14 to 19 December.

== Other activities ==
In 2008, he was an official festival judge for the Noor Iranian Film Festival. In June 2010, Djalili appeared in a Meltdown Festival concert given by the Philharmonia Orchestra at London's Queen Elizabeth Hall, performing the part of the narrator in 'Rubaiyat', a tone poem by American classical composer Alan Hovhaness which sets the words of Omar Khayyám to music.

In February 2022 he shot two pilots of a chat show called Tonight With Omid for the BBC, one version in Persian (for BBC Persian) and another in English.

In August 2023, Djalili appeared on ITV's Kate Garraway's Life Stories series 22, episode 3.

As an Iranian Baháʼí, Djalili writes about and supports "the struggle for women's rights in Iran," which he promotes on his website. On 2 July 2023, he published an article in The Daily Telegraph denouncing the killing of Baháʼí women by the Iranian state.

In September 2025, Djalili was announced as a headlining act for Saudi Arabia's Riyadh Comedy Festival. The event was characterized by Human Rights Watch as an attempt by the Saudi government to whitewash its human rights abuses.

On an interview he made on 14 January 2026, Djalili who has been a longtime critic of the Iranian regime, stated "My friend’s brother was killed in Iran this week", while referring to the 2025-2026 Iranian protests, the 2026 Iran massacres and the government’s internet shutdown. He also added that the family had to pay $5,000 to release the body and sign a false document stating that the brother was killed by protestors as he was a member of security forces.

== Awards ==
Djalili has won awards for his comedy. These include the EMMA Award, Time Out Award, and LWT Comedy Award for Best Stand-up Comedian, Spirit of the Fringe Award as well as the One World Media Award for his Channel 4 documentary, Bloody Foreigners.

He has also been nominated for awards, such as the Perrier Award for Best Comedian, the Gemini Award for Best Comedy Performance of 2003, the South Bank Award for Best Comedy of 2003, the Royal Television Society Award for Best Stand-up, and the European TV Award for his Bloody Foreigners.

== Personal life ==
In 1992, Djalili married actress Annabel Knight, with whom he has three children. He is a practising Baháʼí.

Djalili was present for the Iran Solidarity Rally that took place in Trafalgar Square in January 2023 in support of protests in the wake of Jina (or Mahsa) Amini's custody and death.

== Filmography ==
=== Film ===
Year	Title	Role	Notes
1999	The Mummy	Warden Gad Hassan	
1999	Notting Hill	Cashier at Coffee Shop	
1999	Mad Cows	George	
1999	The World Is Not Enough	Foreman	
2000	Gladiator	Slave Trader	
2001	Spy Game	Beirut: Doumet	
2001	Mean Machine	Raj	
2002	Anita and Me	Uncle Amman	
2003	Cross My Heart	Riz	
2004	Deadlines	Abdul Sayyaf	
2004	The Calcium Kid	Herbie Bush	
2004	Modigliani	Pablo Picasso	
2004	Sky Captain and the World of Tomorrow	Kaji	
2005	Casanova	Lupo	
2006	Alien Autopsy	Melik	
2006	Over the Hedge	Tiger	Voice role
2007	Grow Your Own	Ali	
2007	Pirates of the Caribbean: At World's End	Askay / Pusasn	
2008	The Love Guru	Guru Satchabigknoba	
2009	Dead Man Running	"Bald Fat Fuck"	
2010	The Infidel	Mahmud Nasir	
2010	Sex and the City 2	Mr. Safir	
2010	Animals United	Bongo	Voice role
2010	Mr. Nice	Saleem Malik	
2011	Big Fat Gypsy Gangster	Jik Jickkles	
2015	Shaun the Sheep Movie	Trumper	Voice role
2015	Molly Moon and the Incredible Book of Hypnotism	Barry Rix	
2016	The Comedian's Guide to Survival	Himself	
2018	Mamma Mia! Here We Go Again	Greek customs officer	
2018	The Nutcracker and the Four Realms	Cavalier	
2023	Love Again	Mohsen	
2023	Journey to Bethlehem	Melchior	
2025	Deep Cover	Sagar	
2025	The Bad Guys 2	Mr. Soliman	Voice role
2025	In Your Dreams	Sandman	Voice role

=== Television ===
Year	Title	Role	Notes
1995	Dressing for Breakfast	Turkish Man	Series 1 episode 4
1996	The Friday Night Armistice	Himself	
1998	Alexei Sayle's Merry-Go-Round	Various	
1998	Barking	Various Role	2 episodes
1999	The Ruth Rendell Mysteries	Mr. Kaiafas	Episode: "The Lake of Darkness"
1999	The Bill	Yilmaz Demirtas	
1999	Cleopatra	Storemaster	2 episodes
1999	Coming Soon	Amir Hassan	TV movie
1999–2001	Small Potatoes	Hoss	13 episodes
2000	Black Books	Trebor	
2000	Jason and the Argonauts	Castor	2 episodes
2001	So What Now?	Ken	
2001	Baddiel's Syndrome	Chef	
2002	Relic Hunter	Ahmid	
2002–03	Dinotopia: the Series	Zipeau (voice)	10 episodes
2002–03	Lenny Henry in Pieces		2 episodes
2003	Between Iraq and a Hard Place	Iraqi Television Host	TV movie
2003–04	Whoopi	Nasim Khatenjami	22 episodes
2004	Live at the Apollo	Himself	
2005	Chopra Town	Ali Ergun	TV movie
2005	One Night Stand	Himself	HBO
2005	My Family and Other Animals	Spiro	TV movie
2006	Rob Brydon's Annually Retentive	Himself	
2006	Jack Dee's Lead Balloon	Mr. Tilak	
2006	Harvey Birdman, Attorney at Law	Perfectionist (voice)	1 episode
2007	TV Heaven, Telly Hell	Guest	
2007	Have I Got News for You	Himself	
2007	Premier League All Stars	Chelsea Celebrity player	
2007	Dawn French's Boys Who Do Comedy	Himself	
2007–09	The Omid Djalili Show	Himself, presenter, various roles	12 episodes
2008	Never Mind the Buzzcocks	Guest panellist	
2008	Headcases	Mohamed Al Fayed (voice)	1 episode
2009	Would I Lie To You?	Guest panellist	1 episode
2011	The Paul Reiser Show	Habib	7 episodes
2012	Omid Djalili's Little Cracker	Tobacconist	
2013	Splash!	Contestant	
2013	Moonfleet	Aldobrand	2 episodes
2014	The Great Sport Relief Bake Off	Guest presenter	1 episode
2014	Question Time	Guest panellist	
2015–16	Dickensian	Mr. Venus	11 episodes
2016	Insert Name Here	Guest panellist	
2016	The One Show	Guest presenter	1 episode
2016–18	Stan Lee's Lucky Man	Kamil	9 episodes
2017	Thunderbirds Are Go	Horse Williams (voice)	1 episode
2018	All Together Now Celebrities	Contestant	2nd Place
2019	Queens of Mystery	Guy Ashton	2 episodes
2019–2020	His Dark Materials	Dr. Lanselius	S1&2, Episodes: "Armour" & "The Cave"
2020	The Letter for the King	Sir Fantumar	6 episodes
2020	The Chase: Celebrity Special	Contestant	Series 10, Episode 5, 2020-10-10
2020	Sunday Brunch	Guest	Series 9, Episode 41; 22 November 2020
2020	Celebrity Mastermind	Contestant	Series 18, Episode 1, 19 December 2020
2020	Secrets of the Apollo	Guest contributor	28 December 2020
2020–21	Winning Combination	Presenter	
2021	Michael McIntyre's The Wheel	Celebrity expert	Series 1, Episode 6; 2 January 2021
2021	James Martin’s Saturday Morning	Guest	Series 4, Episode 3; 16 January 2021
2022	Tonight with Omid	Host	Pilot in Persian and English
2023-25	The Change	Steve	TV series
2023	Midsomer Murders	Othello Khan	Episode: "Book of the Dead"
2025	Blankety Blank	Celebrity panellist	Series 4, Episode 9
TBA	The Siege	TBA	Upcoming drama series

=== Video games ===
Year	Title	Role
2009	50 Cent: Blood on the Sand	Eddie
2009	Grand Theft Auto: The Ballad of Gay Tony	Yusuf Amir
2023	Grand Theft Auto Online: The Chop Shop	Yusuf Amir

=== Theatre ===
Year	Title	Role	Director	Venue
2009	Oliver!	Fagin	Rupert Goold	Theatre Royal, Drury Lane
2012	What the Butler Saw	Dr. Rance	Sean Foley	Vaudeville Theatre
2017	Fiddler on the Roof	Tevye	Daniel Evans	Chichester Festival Theatre
2026	Jesus Christ Superstar	King Herod	Timothy Sheader	Theatre Royal, Drury Lane

== See also ==
- Iranian stand-up comedy
