= St. John (restaurant) =

Coordinates: 51°31′13″N 0°6′5″W

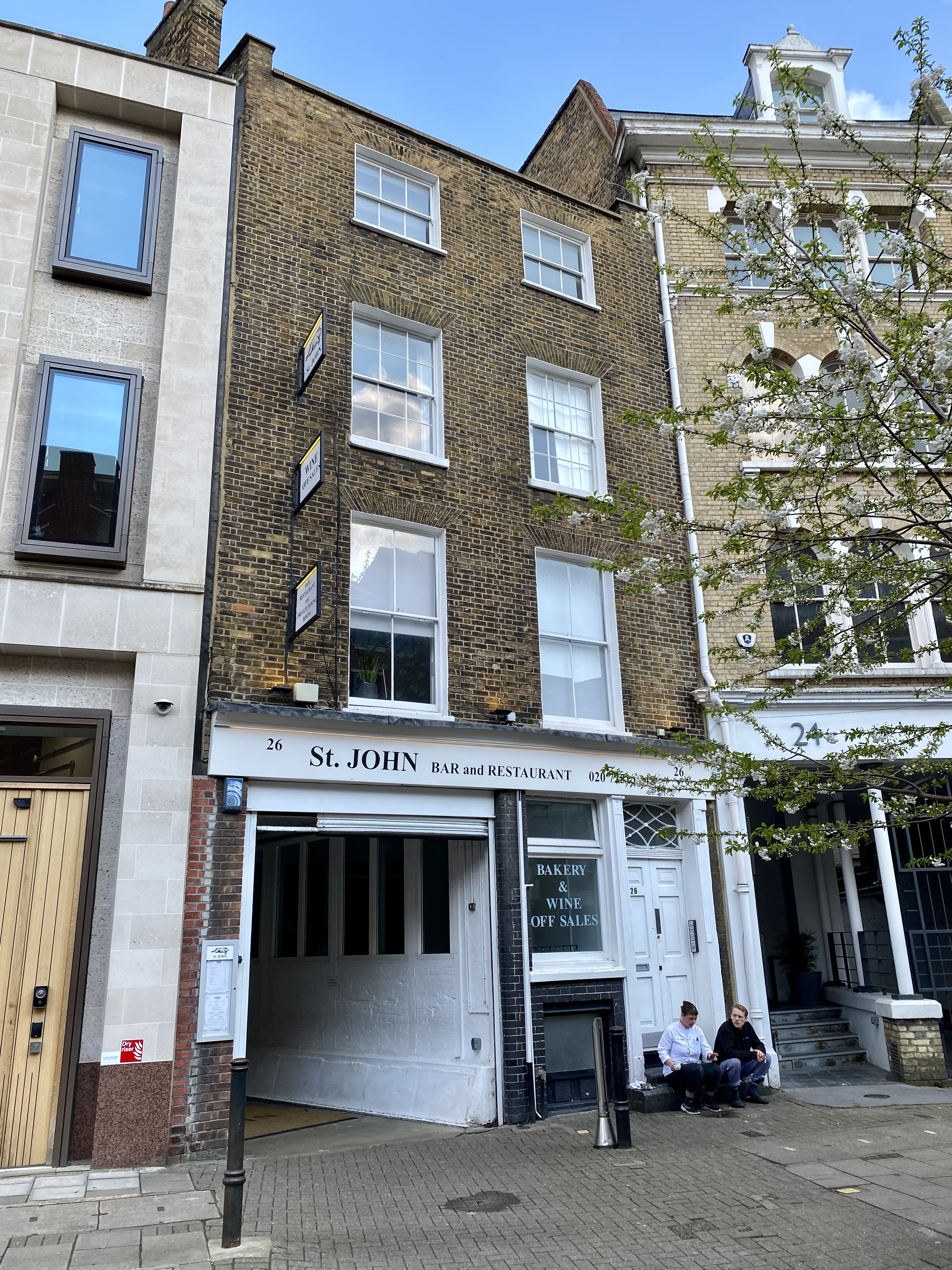
- Interactive map of St. John

Restaurant information
- Established: October 1994
- Location: 26 St. John Street, Smithfield, London, United Kingdom
- Website: stjohnrestaurant.com

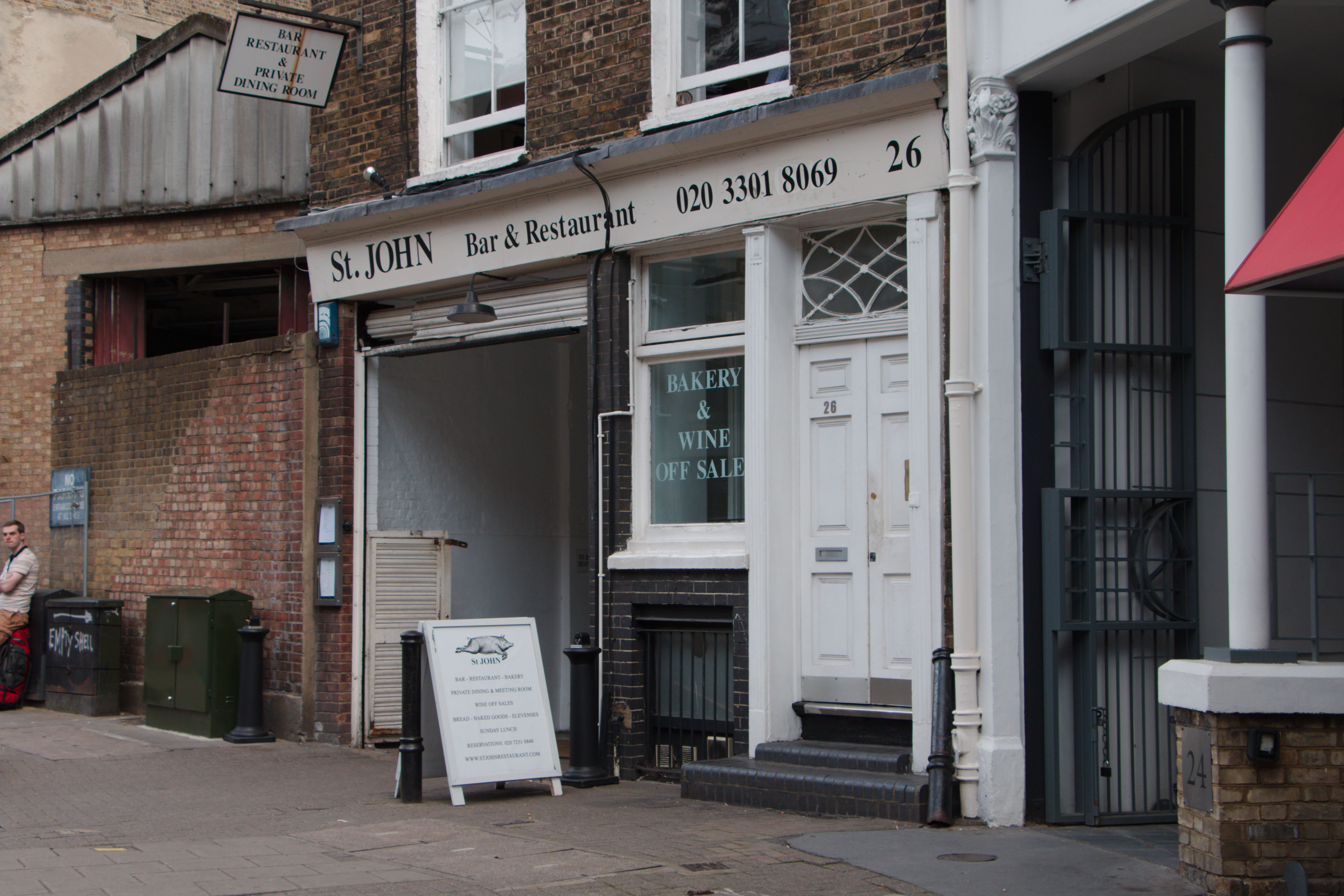
St. John in 2014

St. John is an English restaurant on St John Street in Smithfield, London. It was opened in October 1994 by Trevor Gulliver, Fergus Henderson, and Jon Spiteri on the premises of a former bacon smokehouse. Under Henderson as head chef, St. John specialises in "nose-to-tail eating", with a devotion to offal and other cuts of meat rarely seen in restaurants, often reclaiming traditional British recipes. Typical dishes include pigs' ears, ducks' hearts, trotters, pigs' tails, bone marrow and, when in season, squirrel. St. John has developed a following amongst gastronomic circles: "chefs, foodies, food writers and cooks on sabbatical". It was awarded a Michelin star in 2012.

== Accolades ==
St. John's awards and accolades include Best British and Best overall London Restaurant at the 2001 Moet & Chandon Restaurant Awards. It has also been consistently placed in Restaurant's annual list of the Top 50 restaurants in the world. In 2011, it placed 41st, up from 43rd in the 2010 rankings. It was awarded a Michelin star in 2009. St. John Hotel was awarded a Michelin star in September 2012.

== Related enterprises ==
The original restaurant in Smithfield was joined by a smaller, less formal sister restaurant and bakery in the Spitalfields area of London called St. John Bread and Wine in 2003, and a hotel near Leicester Square in 2011. As of 2013, the hotel is no longer affiliated with St. John restaurants.

They also opened a St John restaurant in Marylebone in 2022 and have three bakeries in London, in Borough Market, Covent Garden and Bermondsey.
