= The Tournament (game show) =

British game show

- Genre: Game show
- Presented by: Alex Scott
- Country of origin: United Kingdom
- Original language: English
- No. of series: 2
- No. of episodes: 55

Production
- Running time: 45 minutes
- Production company: QITV

Original release
- Network: BBC One
- Release: 8 November 2021 – 28 October 2022

The Tournament is a British television game show, first broadcast on 8 November 2021. It is screened on BBC One, produced by QITV and hosted by Alex Scott. It was devised by James Rawson and Dan Schreiber. On 16 May 2022, the BBC renewed The Tournament for a second series, which premiered on 20 September 2022.

In 2023, it was announced that it had not been recommissioned for a third series.

== Gameplay ==
Eight contestants take part in each episode, competing over three rounds and a final until only one remains.

=== Round 1 ===
The host asks eight general-knowledge questions with four answer options each, and all contestants separately and secretly lock in their guesses. After all eight questions have been played, the contestants are displayed on a leaderboard, ranked by the number of correct answers given. Ties are broken in favour of the contestant who took the shorter total time to lock in their responses. Each position on the leaderboard is assigned an amount of money to take into the next round according to the payout structure.

Payout structure
Finishing position	Value	
Finishing position	Series 1	Series 2
1st	£500	£1,000
2nd	£350	£750
3rd	£300	£600
4th	£250	£400
5th	£200	£250
6th	£150	£100
7th	£100	£50
8th	£10	

=== Round 2 ===
This round is played four times. In each matchup, the highest-ranked contestant who has not yet taken part chooses an opponent and one of seven categories. The two contestants stand facing each other at the midline of "The Run," a path marked off in 16 steps so that each has eight behind them. The host asks open-ended questions on the buzzer for two minutes. A correct answer allows the contestant to move ahead one step and pushes the opponent back, while a miss gives the opponent a chance to respond.

When time runs out, the contestant with more steps to their credit on the Run wins and advances to Round 3, claiming the opponent's money in addition to their own. If the matchup ends in a tie, the host continues to ask questions until one contestant answers correctly and wins. Should one contestant claim all 16 steps, they immediately win the round by knockout and are credited with a £500 bonus in addition to the opponent's money.

Categories are removed from play after being used once. At the end of this round, the four remaining contestants are re-ranked based on their total winnings.

=== Semi-finals ===
This round is played twice, under the same rules as Round 2 and using the three remaining categories.

=== Final ===
The two remaining players face each other as in Round 2 and the semi-finals, answering general-knowledge questions. The winner keeps their own cash total, but does not receive the opponent's money. If the final ends in a knockout, the winner does not immediately receive a bonus. Instead, they play a "Golden Run" bonus round in which they can double their money by correctly answering three questions in 30 seconds.

The maximum potential winnings total for a single episode is £5,800 in the first series, and £8,500 in the second. In order to achieve this result, one contestant must end up in control of the four highest cash amounts, win all of their matches by knockout, defeat a semi-final opponent who won their Round 2 match by knockout, and win the Golden Run.
