= Fergus Henderson =

English chef

Fergus Henderson OBE
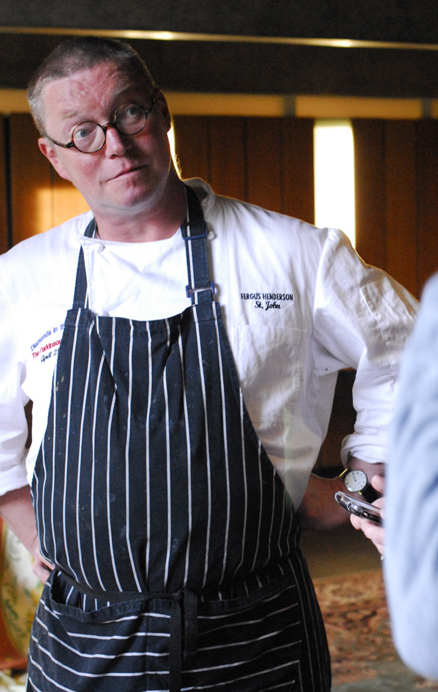
- Fergus Henderson at the Oxford Symposium on Food and Cookery, September 2009
- Born: 31 July 1963 (age 63); London, England
- Education: Architectural Association
- Spouse: Margot Henderson
- Children: 3
- Culinary career
- Cooking style: British cuisine
- Rating
- Michelin stars
- Current restaurant
- St. John

Fergus Henderson OBE (born 31 July 1963) is an English chef who founded the restaurant St. John on St John Street in London. He is known for his use of offal and other neglected cuts of meat as a consequence of his philosophy of nose to tail eating. Following in the footsteps of his parents, Brian and Elizabeth Henderson, he trained as an architect at the Architectural Association in London. Most of his dishes are derived from traditional British cuisine and the wines are all French.

Chefs Anthony Bourdain and Mario Batali have both praised Henderson for his dishes, which optimise British food while making full use of the whole animal. The critic A. A. Gill retracted his initial hostility to St John in the Sunday Times.

== Career ==
Henderson had no formal training in cooking, and has never worked under any other chef. In 1992 Henderson and his wife, Margot, opened the French House Dining Room at Soho's French House pub before he left to open the St. JOHN restaurant in 1994. St. JOHN was awarded a Michelin star in 2009.

In 2003 he opened St. John Bread and Wine in Spitalfields, London. A second St John restaurant within the hotel in Chinatown was awarded a Michelin star in 2009. This venue is no longer open.

== Nose to Tail Books ==
In 1999 Henderson published Nose to Tail Eating: A Kind of British Cooking in which he provides recipes incorporating trotters, tripe, kidneys, chitterlings and other animal parts. The book explains the philosophy behind his cooking explaining that "it seems common sense and even polite to the animal to use all of it. Rather than being testosterone-fuelled blood-lust, it actually seems to be a gentle approach to meat eating." In 2007, he published a sequel, Beyond Nose To Tail, and in 2012 The Complete Nose to Tail: A Kind of British Cooking.

== Hotel ==
Henderson opened a hotel in spring 2011 that was described by his business partner Trevor Gulliver as being 'in the St John vernacular'. It was located in London's Chinatown district near Leicester Square 1 Leicester Street. The hotel went into administration in October 2012, and was sold and subsequently closed.

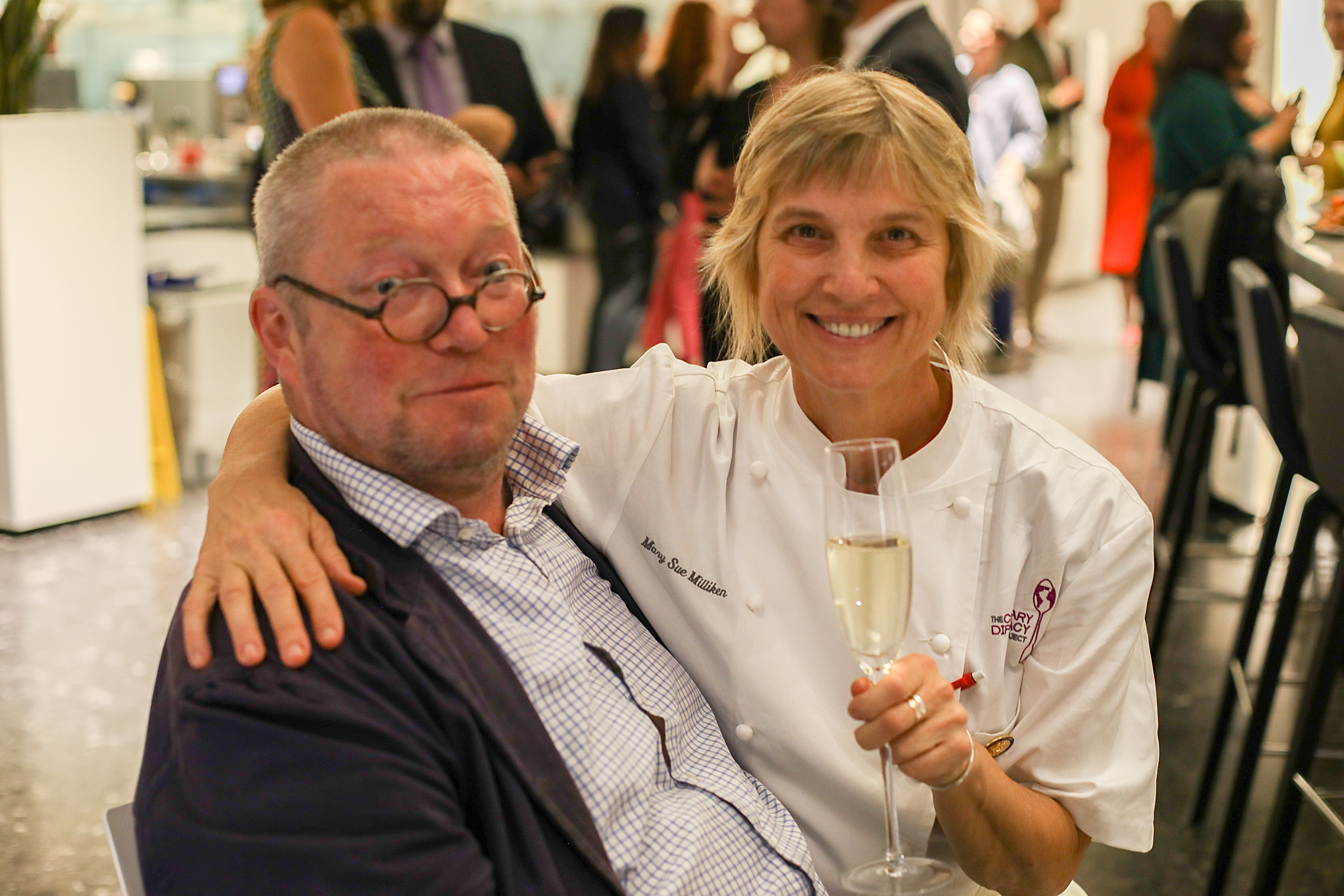
Fergus Henderson with chef Mary Sue Milliken at a dinner at the US Embassy in London in 2019.

== Personal life ==
Henderson is married to fellow chef Margot Henderson; the couple have three children.

He was diagnosed with Parkinson's disease in 1998. In 2005 he underwent innovative Deep Brain Stimulation which improved his mobility.

He was appointed Member of the Order of the British Empire (MBE) in 2005, and was appointed Officer of the Order of the British Empire (OBE) in the 2021 New Year Honours for services to the culinary arts.

== Bibliography ==
- 1999 – Nose to Tail Eating: A Kind of British Cooking (Bloomsbury Publishing) ISBN 9780747572572
- 2007 – Beyond Nose to Tail: A Kind of British Cooking: Part II (Bloomsbury Publishing) ISBN 9780747589143
- 2012 – The Complete Nose to Tail: A Kind of British Cooking (Bloomsbury Publishing) ISBN 9781408809167
- 2019 — The Book of St John: Over 100 brand new recipes from London‘s iconic restaurant (Ebury Press) ISBN 9781529103212
