= 2021 in British television =

This is a list of events that took place in 2021 relating to television in the United Kingdom.

== Events ==
=== January ===
Date	Event
1	BBC One airs Alicia Keys Rocks New Year's Eve to see in 2021, as well as the fireworks display from London. This year's display includes a light show created by 300 drones that pays tribute to NHS staff and notable figures of 2020. Overnight figures indicate the display is watched by 10.75 million viewers.
1	BBC One airs "Revolution of the Daleks", the New Year's Day special of Doctor Who. The episode sees John Barrowman return as Captain Jack Harkness, as well as the departure of Graham and Ryan, played by Bradley Walsh and Tosin Cole. Following its broadcast, comedian John Bishop is revealed as the character Dan, who will be The Doctor's companion in the next series.
1	BBC Two airs the annual Vienna New Year's Concert. Because of the Coronavirus pandemic there is no live audience for the 2021 concert, but the concert is able to go ahead as the orchestra have been Coronavirus tested on a daily basis.
3	The Mirror reports that Jodie Whittaker will leave her role as the Thirteenth Doctor at the end of the next series of Doctor Who. In response the BBC says it would comment on the matter.
4	In a televised address, Prime Minister Boris Johnson announces a third lockdown for England, with rules similar to those in both March 2020 and November 2020. It is viewed by over 24 million people on TV.
5	The BBC announces that programming for schools will air on BBC Two and CBBC, as well as online, during the latest lockdown, starting from Monday 11 January.
6	Oliver Dowden, the Secretary of State for Digital, Culture, Media and Sport, announces that Richard Sharp, former chair of the Royal Academy of Arts, is the government's preferred choice for the next Chairman of the BBC.
6	Sky Cinema Disney ceases broadcasting making it the last Disney related channel to close and now all of Disney's content are available exclusively on Disney+.
7	ITV announces that filming for Series 15 of Britain's Got Talent has been suspended because of the Coronavirus pandemic.
7	Visitors to Gwrych Castle, near Abergele, used for filming I'm a Celebrity...Get Me Out of Here! in 2020, will be able to see some of the sets used for the series when the castle reopens, it has been confirmed.
8	Graham Norton, who presents the Eurovision Song Contest, has said the 2021 contest, scheduled for May, will definitely go ahead as planned.
14	Richard Sharp, the BBC's incoming chairman, says that the licence fee is the "least worst" way of funding the BBC.
14	Maya Jama is announced as the new presenter of Glow Up: Britain's Next Make-Up Star, replacing Stacey Dooley.
15	Filming on Emmerdale is paused because of a Coronavirus outbreak on set.
18	Steven Knight, creator of the BBC television series Peaky Blinders, confirms the upcoming sixth series will be the last. The following day he announces that a film will follow the final series.
20	A National Audit Office report concludes the BBC faces "significant" uncertainty over its financial future due to changes in viewing habits.
21	The UK government confirms plans to shelve the decriminalisation of the TV licence for the time being, but says it will "remain under active consideration".
22	Ahead of a full rollout on all media platforms, the UK government's "Can you look them in the eyes?" public health campaign is launched on television, with ads on ITV and Channel 4; the ads are designed to encourage people to adhere to Coronavirus restrictions.
23	Sky announces plans for a TV drama about the Coronavirus pandemic that will feature the stories of real people during the pandemic, including healthcare workers and those working in care homes, and is scheduled to air in 2022. But plans for This Sceptred Isle, which will star Kenneth Branagh as Prime Minister Boris Johnson, draw widespread criticism from those who feel it is too early to make such a drama, particularly when the pandemic is ongoing and Johnson's handling of it has been criticised by media and politicians.
25	Sky UK announces an increase in the number of original films and television series in an attempt to compete with streaming platforms such as Netflix.
25	Filming on Emmerdale resumes, but filming of Coronation Street is paused for two weeks to allow writers to amend storylines so they can fit in with current Coronavirus restrictions.
28	GB News hires Sun journalist Dan Wootton to present a daily show on the forthcoming channel.
28	ITV postpones the next series of Britain's Got Talent until 2022 amid concerns over safety during the Coronavirus outbreak.

=== February ===
Date	Event
2	Channel 4's on demand streaming service, All 4, has claimed a record number of viewers for the five-part Russell T Davies series It's a Sin, which it says has been viewed 6.5 million times since its release on 22 January.
3	Organisers of the 2021 Eurovision Song Contest, scheduled for May, have ruled out a full event without social distancing because of the ongoing Coronavirus pandemic.
3	Comedian Rufus Hound withdraws from Dancing on Ice after testing positive for Coronavirus. He is replaced by presenter Matt Richardson.
4	Ofcom revokes China Global Television Network's licence to broadcast in the UK after it emerges that the company running the news channel does not have day-to-day control over it, something that is against Ofcom rules.
5	Police in Northern Ireland have warned a Panorama team of a threat from a criminal following the broadcast of an edition of the programme on 1 February that alleged an individual's influence on world boxing.
5	Channel 4 begins showing England's cricket tour to India. This is the first time that an overseas tour has been seen in full on free-to-air television and is the first test cricket broadcast on free-to-air television, and Channel 4, since 2005.
5	News UK hires Gordon Smart, a former presenter with Radio X to present and produce a daily TV programme provisionally titled News to Me.
6	John Humphrys announces he will step down as presenter of Mastermind at the end of the current series in March.
7	Democratic Unionist Party MP Gregory Campbell is accused of "race-baiting" after describing the number of black people on an edition of Songs of Praise as "the BBC at its BLM (Black Lives Matter) worst". Campbell made the remarks in a post on social media during 31 January edition of the programme that was covering the Gospel Singer of the Year competition.
8	Doctors returns to transmission following its extended Christmas break.
9	It is reported that Coronation Street actors Elle Mulvaney and Tanisha Gorey have confirmed filming on the soap has resumed.
12	The character Tracy Beaker (played by Dani Harmer) returns to television in My Mum Tracy Beaker, a three-part CBBC series showing her as an adult with a young daughter. The show breaks CBBC records, gaining 883,000 viewers, half of those were young adults returning and the half being children aged 4 and up.
13	Joss Stone wins the second series of The Masked Singer. Overnight viewing figures indicate the programme was watched by 8.6 million viewers.
15	Channel 4 announces that Anne Robinson is to be the first female host of Countdown; she will take up the role when current presenter Nick Hewer steps down later in the year.
15	ITV announces that production of Dancing on Ice is being suspended for a week, due to the large number of celebrities withdrawing from the competition either due to injury or Coronavirus. The show planned for 21 February is replaced with a compilation special.
18	Commercial television stations in the UK air a short film featuring celebrities urging people from ethnic communities to get vaccinated. Those appearing in the film include Sanjeev Bhaskar, Meera Syal and Romesh Ranganathan.
19	James Newman is chosen to represent the United Kingdom at the 2021 Eurovision Song Contest, giving him a second chance to take part in the contest after the 2020 contest was cancelled due to Coronavirus.
19	Radio presenter Roman Kemp is to front a documentary for BBC Three about suicide among young males.
22	In a televised address, Prime Minister Boris Johnson unveils a four-step plan for ending coronavirus restrictions in England by 21 June.
22	Jason Donovan confirms he has been forced to pull out of Dancing on Ice due to ongoing back pain.
23	Disney+ adds their new hub, Star, featuring more adult-aimed content from 20th Century Studios, ABC Signature and Hulu. The hub also features the launch of Star original programming.
26	ITV confirms plans to curtail Series 13 of Dancing on Ice by a week due to the number of participants who have dropped out due to injury, bringing the final forward from 21 to 14 March.
26	Talent agent and author Melanie Blake announces her plans to launch a new British soap opera, Falcon Bay. The soap would be based on her book, Ruthless Women. She confirms that Stephanie Beacham would star in the soap if she secures the rights to the production.
27	BBC One covers England's Six Nations match against Wales in which the latter win 40–24. Following the game, sports reporter Sonja McLaughlan receives abuse on social media, something that is subsequently condemned by the BBC.

=== March ===
Date	Event
2	The BBC confirms that BBC Three will be relaunched as a television channel in January 2022, six years after going online. Since 2016 the service has been responsible for creating dramas such as Fleabag and Killing Eve, something that has prompted calls for its return.
2	Organisers of the 2021 Eurovision Song Contest confirm acts from the 41 participating countries will travel to Rotterdam to take part in a live performance. A decision on whether an audience will be invited is yet to be made.
2	Channel 4 confirms it will not be working with Ant Middleton again because of his "personal conduct"; the SAS: Who Dares Wins instructor drew criticism in 2020 for comments he made about the Black Lives Matter protests and Coronavirus. In response to the news, Middleton says the programme was taken over by the "woke patrol".
4	Police have ruled out a criminal investigation into events surrounding Martin Bashir's 1995 Panorama interview with Diana, Princess of Wales.
4	ITV confirms that Love Island will return for a new series in summer 2021.
8	ITV airs Oprah with Meghan and Harry, a 90-minute programme in which Oprah Winfrey speaks to the Duke and Duchess of Sussex about their decision to leave the British royal family. Overnight figures indicate the programme is watched by an audience of 12.4 million.
8	The Oprah Winfrey interview, shown in the United States the previous day, is a discussion topic on the day's edition of Good Morning Britain during which presenter Piers Morgan states he "doesn't believe a word" the Duchess of Sussex says in regard to comments she makes about the state of her mental health. Morgan's comments attract criticism from the mental health charity Mind, which says it is "disappointed" by his remarks.
8	Ofcom announces it will not take any action over a controversial Newsnight introduction from May 2020 concerning the Dominic Cummings scandal in which presenter Emily Maitlis said "the country can see" Cummings had "broken the rules" by driving 260 miles during the first national lockdown.
9	ITV announces that Piers Morgan has stepped down as a presenter of Good Morning Britain following his comments about the Duchess of Sussex. The decision comes after Ofcom received 41,000 complaints about the remarks.
9	ITV Chief Executive Dame Carolyn McCall confirms that Series 21 of I'm a Celebrity...Get Me Out of Here! will be filmed in Australia if Coronavirus restrictions allow travel to that country by the time it is due to air.
10	It is reported that the Duchess of Sussex has made a formal complaint to ITV about Piers Morgan's on air comments about her mental health, as Morgan says he stands by what he said.
10	ITV presenter Charlene White pulls out of hosting the British Press Awards after the Society of Editors rejects claims by the Duke and Duchess of Sussex that the British tabloid press is "bigoted". The Society of Editors challenged the couple to provide evidence for what it described as their "attack", prompting White to suggest they find "someone whose views align" with the Society that "the UK press is the one institution in the entire country who has a perfect record on race". Ian Murray subsequently resigns as the Society's executive director over the issue.
10	ITV announces that Tracie Bennett is returning to Coronation Street reprising her role as Sharon Bentley after 22 years away. Bennett originally appeared in the serial between 1982 and 1984 and again in 1999.
11	The BBC announces plans to adapt its coverage of Scottish and Welsh Government daily Coronavirus briefings during the weeks preceding the Scottish Parliament and Senedd elections. The decision comes after the Scottish Conservatives accused Scottish First Minister Nicola Sturgeon of using the briefings to "launch political attacks".
11	The BBC announces plans to continue its schools education programming into the summer to support teachers, with a daily three hour BBC Bitesize Learning launched for the CBBC Channel and for BBC iPlayer.
11	The BBC announces it has cancelled The Mash Report "in order to make room for new comedy shows".
11	"Embers" is revealed by singer James Newman as the 2021 UK entry for the Eurovision Song Contest.
12	Ofcom confirms that Meghan, Duchess of Sussex has made a formal complaint about Piers Morgan's comments on Good Morning Britain.
12	Plans are announced to relaunch SuperTed with new episodes of the 1980s cartoon series for a new generation of viewers.
14	Sonny Jay wins the thirteenth series of ITV's Dancing on Ice.
17	Channel 4 airs Caroline Flack: Her Life and Death, a documentary examining the late television presenter's emotional state. The documentary is largely praised by critics for its compassionate dealing with the topic.
17	Ofcom has received a total of 57,121 complaints about Piers Morgan's comments regarding Meghan, Duchess of Sussex, a record for the number of complaints received about something on television, and 12,600 more than was received about the 2007 series of Celebrity Big Brother.
18	The BBC announce plans to relocate numerous productions from London to other parts of the country, in an effort to make "the corporation more reflective of the UK". They state that by the end of 2021, 60% of BBC productions will be based outside of London, meaning as a result, that 400 jobs will be relocated. The changes also include the launch of two new long-running television series; one set in the north of England, and one set in another nation of the UK.
20	Craig Eddie wins Series 10 of The Voice UK.
21	BBC One drama Line of Duty returns for its sixth series. The opening episode is watched by 9.6m viewers.
22	A joint three year BBC–Sky deal is agreed with the Football Association that will see live Women's Super League matches shown live on television. The "landmark" deal, worth £7m–£8m a year will see 22 matches aired live by the BBC, at least 18 of them on BBC One or BBC Two, with 44 matches shown by Sky Sports. Any matches not shown by either broadcaster will air on FA Player.
22	BBC journalist Clive Myrie has been named the new host of quiz show Mastermind, replacing John Humphrys, who has stepped down after 18 years.
23	The BBC broadcasts Lockdown Live: What Next, marking the first anniversary of the day Prime Minister Boris Johnson announced the first lockdown.
25	Newsreader Simon McCoy announces he is leaving the BBC after 17 years to join GB News.
26	Channel 4 confirms that the Crufts Dog Show has been cancelled due to the ongoing Covid-19 pandemic. It is the first cancellation since the 1954 electricians' strike.

=== April ===
Date	Event
1	The cost of a TV licence increases by £1.50, from £157.50 to £159.
5	Ofcom issues new guidelines for reality television shows requiring them to show "due care" to the wellbeing of those who take part in them. But some participants have warned the rules do not go far enough.
7	Sky News launches The Daily Climate Show, the first prime time news programme dedicated to climate change. It is presented by Anna Jones.
8	Dan Walker is to step down from presenting BBC's Football Focus at the end of the season after 12 years in the role.
9	All major TV channels, including BBC One, BBC Two, ITV, Channel 4 and Channel 5 suspend regular programming following the death of Prince Philip, which is announced at midday. BBC One breaks into its morning schedule to air a BBC News special, while ITV cuts short This Morning to hand over to ITV News. Programmes are then cancelled in favour of ongoing news coverage of unfolding events and special programmes paying tribute to the Prince. Among the programmes to be pulled from the day's schedule are The One Show, EastEnders, Have I Got News for You, Gardeners' World and the MasterChef final on BBC One and BBC Two respectively, and Emmerdale and Coronation Street on ITV. Channel 4 amends programming to air an obituary, but announces its intention to still show Hollyoaks, Gogglebox and the final of The Circle, a decision that attracts criticism from viewers. Channel 5 pulls the Australian soaps Home and Away and Neighbours in order to air documentaries on Prince Philip during the afternoon and a special 2-hour edition of 5 News between 5pm and 7pm. Programming on BBC Four is suspended entirely for the day. The BBC receives a significant number of viewer complaints for its continuous coverage, and within six hours of the announcement of the Prince's death establishes a dedicated form to deal with complaints about the schedule changes. Viewer ratings fall across the television networks, with BBC One audiences down by 6% when compared to the same day the previous week, BBC Two audiences down by two thirds, and ITV losing 60% of its viewers.
12	The Sun reports the BBC has received 100,000 viewer complaints about its coverage of the death of Prince Philip.
13	Former England captain David Beckham will feature in the Disney+ series Save Our Squad in which he will mentor grassroots footballers.
14	Channel 4 airs a special episode of Hollyoaks based on the unconscious bias that black women in the UK suffer from. The episode, based on the differing experiences of Martine Deveraux (Kéllé Bryan) and Grace Black (Tamara Wall), receives widespread praise from viewers and the media.
14	BBC One airs the rescheduled final of MasterChef, which is won by Tom Rhodes.
15	The BBC confirms it has received 109,741 complaints about its coverage of the death of Prince Philip, setting a new record for the number of complaints received about a single television-related issue.
15	Helen Whitelaw, 76, a former contestant on ITV's Tipping Point who lost her speech after being diagnosed with Motor Neurone Disease, has had it reconstructed by engineers who used the recording of her appearance on the game show to build it into a speech aid.
17	The funeral of Prince Philip takes place at St George's Chapel, Windsor and is televised by the major networks. BBC One's coverage (also aired by the BBC News channel) is presented by Huw Edwards, Sophie Raworth and JJ Chalmers, while Tom Bradby and Julie Etchingham present coverage for ITV. Sky News's coverage (also aired on Sky One) is presented by Dermot Murnaghan. Overnight viewing figures indicate a collective audience of 13.6 million, with 11 million people tuning in for the BBC's coverage, 2.1 million watching ITV, and around 450,000 viewing Sky. An edited version of the coverage aired later in the day by BBC Two is seen by an audience of 1.1 million.
19	The sequel to the 2019 film that continues popular ITV series Downton Abbey, and provisionally titled Downton Abbey 2, is confirmed, with a planned release date of 22 December.
19	CBeebies debuts the Australian preschool animated programme Bluey beginning with the first ever episode entitled "Magic Xylophone".
25	BBC One airs the penultimate episode of Line of Duty, with overnight viewing figures showing it to have an average audience of 11 million, or a 51.7% audience share.
26	Jonathan Gibson, a 24-year-old student from Glasgow, becomes the 2021 Mastermind champion, and the youngest person to win the series.
26	Channel 5 has stopped streaming an episode of its plastic surgery documentary series Celebrities: What Happened to Your Face? that aired on 22 April and discusses reality television star Charlotte Crosby following criticism from Crosby, who described it as "immoral" and warned about the show's potential effect on people's mental health.
29	Channel 4 and ITN announces that Jon Snow is to leave Channel 4 News at the end of 2021 after 32 years.
29	Ronan Keating and Jermaine Jenas have been given permanent spots on The One Show sofa, officially being named Alex Jones's co-hosts on the BBC programme.
30	The BBC confirms the return of Blankety Blank for a new series, with Bradley Walsh as presenter. The decision follows the success of a one-off Christmas special, which features Walsh.
30	ITV announces that it will not air the final episode of Viewpoint following allegations of sexual harassment against actor Noel Clarke. The episode will instead be broadcast on their on-demand platform ITV Hub "for a limited time". Sky suspends filming of the fourth series of Bulletproof, which features Clarke.

=== May ===
Date	Event
2	Teenage percussionist Fang Zhang is named BBC Young Musician of 2020.
2	BBC One airs the final episode in Series 6 of Line of Duty, with overnight figures indicating an average audience of 12.8 million, a record for the series.
4	Star Wars: The Bad Batch, a sequel/spinoff to Star Wars: The Clone Wars, begins streaming on Disney+ with the first episode celebrating Star Wars Day and 70 minutes long. New episodes continued streaming every Friday.
5	In a Daily Telegraph article, Ant and Dec criticise what they describe as the "London-centric" television industry that they feel is becoming increasingly inaccessible to young people hoping to work in it.
7	Former Downing Street Director of Communications Robbie Gibb joins the BBC Board as board member for England.
7	Channel 4 announce the decision to not renew The Circle for a fourth series. Production company Studio Lambert express plans to have the series continue through Netflix.
10	It is reported the New Cross fire and 1981 Brixton riot are to be examined in Uprising, a new three-part documentary for BBC One.
13	At the age of 28, businessman Steven Bartlett is confirmed as the youngest dragon to appear on Dragons' Den; he replaces Tej Lalvani, who announced he was leaving the series earlier in the year.
14	Martin Bashir steps down as the BBC's religion editor.
15	Alex Scott takes over as presenter of Football Focus following Dan Walker's decision to stand down from the role at the end of the season.
16	ITV announces that Birds of a Feather has been axed after 31 years.
17	A spokesperson for Fox UK announces that it will cease broadcasting on 30 June, with its content moving to Star, a hub recently began streaming on Disney+ UK.
18	Presenter Zoe Ball has announces she is leaving Strictly Come Dancing's spin-off programme It Takes Two, which she has presented since 2011.
20	An inquiry into the 1995 Panorama interview with Diana, Princess of Wales has found that the BBC fell short of "high standards of integrity and transparency" over the programme and that presenter Martin Bashir acted "deceitfully" by faking documents in order to secure an interview with the princess. A 1996 BBC inquiry into the programme is also found to be "woefully ineffective".
20	Windsor and Maidenhead Borough Council refuse Netflix permission to build a film set for its historical drama series Bridgerton, which it wanted to construct at Sunninghill Park. The request is refused as an "inappropriate development of the green belt" despite receiving Royal approval.
21	Prime Minister Boris Johnson expresses his concern at the findings of the inquiry into the BBC's 1995 Panorama interview with Diana, Princess of Wales, and says the BBC should take "every possible step" to ensure a similar future incident does not happen.
21	Sky officially axes Bulletproof after three series and following allegations of bullying against its star, Noel Clarke.
22	The 2021 Eurovision Song Contest in Rotterdam, The Netherlands is won by music group Måneskin for Italy with their song "Zitti e buoni". James Newman represents the United Kingdom with his song "Embers", which ends up finishing in 26th and last place and scoring no points for the first time in eighteen years. Before this, the last time the UK's contest entry scored no points was with Jemini's song "Cry Baby" at the 2003 contest in Riga, Latvia.
23	Home Secretary Priti Patel describes the BBC's reputation as having been "highly damaged" by the controversy over the 1995 Panorama interview with Diana, Princess of Wales.
23	Virgin Media has reached an agreement with O2 for a new merged brand, Virgin Media O2. Both of Virgin Media and O2 Households have retained unified as one, forming their new merged name and plans are yet to be announced for both their broadband, entertainment and mobile services later this year.
24	The BBC announces an investigation into its editorial practices and a review of the decision to hire Martin Bashir as religious affairs correspondent in 2016.
24	The BBC has secured the rights to broadcast footage from the Live at Worthy Farm livestream concert held on 22 May. A behind-the-scenes documentary is also planned.
27	Sky One broadcasts the British television premiere of Friends: The Reunion at 8pm, although the documentary is made available on Now TV from 8am to coincide with its release in the United States.
29	Producer Charlie Hanson is removed from Netflix comedy series After Life and suspended from the British Academy of Film and Television Arts following allegations of sexual assault.

=== June ===
Date	Event
1	O2 and Virgin Media merged to create VMED O2 UK Limited, branded as Virgin Media O2 and structured as a joint venture between Telefónica and Liberty Global.
2	The BBC announces that Holby City is to end in March 2022 after 23 years.
5	A proposed statue of Nick Park's characters Wallace and Gromit is announced. If given approval it will be erected in August in the creator's home town of Preston, Lancashire.
6	Michaela Coel and Paul Mescal are among the winners at the 2021 British Academy Television Awards for their respective roles as leading actress and actor in I May Destroy You and Normal People.
7	Television journalist Kay Burley returns to Sky News following a six-month absence imposed by her breach of Coronavirus restrictions while celebrating her 60th birthday in December 2020.
8	BBC Breakfast presenter Louise Minchin announces she is to leave the programme after almost 20 years, and will depart "some time after the summer".
9	Loki begins streaming on Disney+ every Wednesday, becoming the first Disney+ Original on the service not to stream on Fridays.
10	It is announced that Janette Manrara will leave Strictly Come Dancing as a professional dancer and replace Zoe Ball as a new It Takes Two presenter.
12	Among those from the world of television recognised in the 2021 Birthday Honours are Arlene Phillips, Jonathan Pryce and Prue Leith, who receive damehoods and knighthoods respectively.
13	GB News goes live on air at 8pm, with its opening night beset by technical glitches. According to the TV industry magazine Broadcast it enjoys a peak audience of 336,000, surpassing the 100,000 viewers tuned in to the BBC News channel and the 46,000 watching Sky News.
14	The BBC announce that Charlie Brooks is returning to EastEnders reprising her role as Janine Butcher after seven years away.
14	BBC iPlayer begins premiering boxsets of EastEnders prior to their broadcast on BBC One. EastEnders' executive producer Jon Sen states that due to inevitable scheduling conflicts that the UEFA European Championship annually causes to the soap, the network wanted to give fans of the programme a chance to watch a week's worth of episodes at their own pace. ITV soaps Coronation Street and Emmerdale also begin to release boxsets on ITV Hub.
14	Jackson Moyles and Tyrone Williams are named joint winners of BBC Four's Great British Photography Challenge.
15	Prime Minister Boris Johnson condemns protestors who harassed journalist Nicholas Watt, the political editor of BBC Two's Newsnight, during an anti-lockdown demonstration outside Downing Street the previous day. Footage of the incident has been circulated online.
15	Ikea, Octopus Energy and Kopparberg are among companies to withdraw advertising from GB News following its launch. Kopparberg says the ads ran without their knowledge and they are withdrawing them while they assess the channel's content, while Octopus says it will advertise with the news channel if its content proves to be impartial.
16	It is reported Ofcom have received 373 complaints relating to an anti-government policy monologue on the Coronavirus lockdown in Britain that aired on GB News during the opening night's edition of Tonight Live with Dan Wootton.
16	Part of the care protocols on ITV2's Love Island will include training for contestants on how to deal with the potentially negative impact of social media.
20	Nigel Farage and Dehenna Davison join GB News to host the Sunday morning political discussion programme The Political Correction.
20	During a heated debate on GB News about transgender issues, transgender news presenter India Willoughby announces she will no longer appear as a guest on the channel and accuses it of "demonising trans people at every opportunity".
22	Channel 4 bosses warn of "a real risk" to some of the channel's programming if the UK government goes through with proposals for it to be privatised.
23	The UK government publishes proposals to tighten regulations for streaming services such as Netflix and Amazon Prime to bring them in line with broadcasters such as the BBC and ITV. A consultation on the privatisation of Channel 4 is also officially announced.
24	Figures published by the BBC show that it received 6,417 complaints about the broadcast of the Denmark vs Finland Euro 2021 match during which Denmark player Christian Eriksen collapsed.
24	Anton Du Beke is to replace Bruno Tonioli on the judging panel for the next series of Strictly Come Dancing.
25	Jonny Lee Miller, who rose to prominence after appearing in Trainspotting has been cast as Sir John Major in the fifth series of The Crown.
27	BBC Two airs a 3-hour cut of Glastonbury's Live at Worthy Farm. The 5-hour cinematic concert, which featured performances from artists including Coldplay, Damon Albarn, HAIM, Jorja Smith, Michael Kiwanuka and George Ezra, was live-streamed online in May. The broadcast was preceded by a making-of documentary.
28	The BBC announces plans to make a new series of The Weakest Link with Romesh Ranganathan as presenter and celebrities as contestants.
29	The BBC confirms the licence fee grace period for over-75s will end on 31 July; some 260,000 people in this group are yet to pay for a licence.
29	England's Euro 2021 match against Germany, which sees England beat Germany 2–0, attracts an audience of 20.6 million for BBC One, with a further 6.5 million streams on BBC iPlayer. The match sets a new record for live streams on iPlayer of 5.6 million.
30	After 17 years of broadcasting, Fox UK ceases broadcasting with most of its content moving to Star, Via Disney+ UK.

=== July ===
Date	Event
1	Comedian Joe Lycett storms off an edition of Steph's Packed Lunch, then reveals the following day that it was a planned stunt to raise awareness of single use plastic.
2	ITV condemns death threats made to Love Island contestant Chloe Burrows as "wholly unacceptable".
5	Ofcom says it will not investigate comments made by Dan Wootton on GB News during a debate about lockdown on 13 June. The watchdog had received 390 complaints about the comments in which Wootton called for restrictions to be lifted and for people to push back against "doomsday scientists".
5	Channel 4 announces that 70% of its presenters for its coverage of the 2020 Paralympic Games will be disabled.
7	25.71 million people tune in to watch England beat Denmark 2–1 in extra time in the semi-finals of UEFA Euro 2021, becoming the most watched non-news live TV event of 2021 so far.
9	Figures show that Ofcom has received a record number of complaints over its most recent 12-month period, with 142,660 complaints between 1 April 2020 and 31 March 2021, a 410% rise on the previous year and the largest number of complaints received by the watchdog over a year since it began in 2003.
8	Top Gear presenter Paddy McGuinness is to replace Sue Barker as host of BBC game show A Question of Sport.
8	The Queen visits the set of Coronation Street as part of the show's 60th anniversary celebrations.
8	Tim Campbell is confirmed as a replacement for Claude Littner on the next series of The Apprentice as Littner recovers from a cycling accident.
11	30.95 million people tune into watch England lose the UEFA Euro 2021 Final 2–3 on penalties to Italy, following a 1–1 draw after extra time, making it the most-watched UK event since the funeral of Princess Diana in 1997 and the 1966 World Cup Final. The final is broadcast live on both BBC One and ITV.
14	Audience figures for GB News on this date are subsequently reported as zero by the ratings measurement board BARB on at least two occasions, attributed to regular viewers boycotting the station after one of its presenters, Guto Harri, takes a knee on-air in solidarity with the England football team.
16	As a one-off move, Formula E announces the free-to-air rights for the London ePrix will air live on Channel 4 because the BBC and Eurosport are showing coverage of the 2021 Tokyo Olympics.
16	Following a backlash from viewers, GB News says its presenter Guto Harri is unlikely to appear on screen again for the rest of the summer after he breached their regulations by taking the knee on air in support of England footballers during a debate on racism. GB News says it "let both sides of the argument down by oversimplifying a very complex issue".
16	Actor Ryan Reynolds becomes the latest celebrity to appear on CBeebies Bedtime Stories, where he reads Maurice Sendak's Where the Wild Things Are.
17	GB News have signed Nigel Farage to present a weekday evening programme from Monday 19 July.
19	Guto Harri leaves his presenting position at GB News following a row over his taking the knee live on air.
19	GB News have signed Talkradio presenter Mark Dolan to host Tonight Live with Mark Dolan, a weekend show on Friday, Saturday and Sunday evenings. Current weekend evening presenter Nana Akua will front a weekend afternoon show at 3pm, as well as The Great British Breakfast.
19	Jowita Przystał, who won the 2020 series of BBC One's The Greatest Dancer is to join Strictly Come Dancing's professional line-up. Also joining for the next series are Nikita Kuzmin, Cameron Lombard and Kai Widdrington.
21	The Only Way Is Essex announce that several cast members have been axed prior to the twenty-eighth series in a bid to focus on fewer cast members. They state that all former cast members will be able to receive welfare support from ITV.
21	GB News is criticised as "vile" by some viewers after posting a video of Nigel Farage ahead of a report from him about migrants crossing the English Channel. In the footage Farage describes their boat as having "probably been stolen" and saying the migrants are having a "lovely day".
22	ITV confirms that Gary Lineker will front a new game show titled Sitting on a Fortune.
23	Good Morning Britain presenters Kate Garraway and Richard Madeley apologise to viewers after Foreign Correspondent John Simpson uses an expletive live on air during the day's edition of the programme.
23	ITV period drama Victoria which starred Jenna Coleman and Tom Hughes as Queen Victoria and Prince Albert respectively has been axed after three series.
26	At 10am, BBC Parliament begins simulcasting the BBC News Channel for the first time during a parliamentary recess. Previously the channel had broadcast highlights from the previous Parliamentary term during all Parliamentary recesses.
28	Sky announces its flagship channel Sky One will shut down on 1 September, to be replaced by two channels; Sky Showcase, showing a mixture of content from other Sky Channels, and Sky Max, showing Sky's original programming and entertainment previously shown on Sky One.
28	An episode of The Morecambe & Wise Show from 1970 that was believed to have been lost has been unearthed by Eric Morecambe's son, Gary, during a search of his attic.
29	ITV announces that The X Factor has been axed after 17 years.
29	The BBC confirms that Jodie Whittaker would be leaving Doctor Who in 2022, while Chris Chibnall will step down as the programme's writer and showrunner. Whittaker's exit will come in autumn 2022 following a trio of special episodes, with her final episode part of the BBC's centenary celebrations.
29	American broadcaster NBC announces their streaming service, Peacock, will be launching to Sky and NOW platforms.
29	CBBC replaces a airing of Scooby-Doo! Camp Scare in favour of Paddington.

=== August ===
Date	Event
2	ITV confirms that Series 21 of I'm a Celebrity...Get Me Out of Here! will be filmed in north Wales, the second year the show has taken place there because of Coronavirus travel restrictions.
4	The BBC announces that it will be relocating Top Gear production from London to Bristol in 2022.
4	An edition of Love Island involving postcards that viewers felt could be misleading and potentially cause distress has attracted the most number of viewer complaints for the series so far, with Ofcom receiving 4,330 viewer complaints. Ofcom are deciding whether to launch an investigation.
5	Strictly Come Dancing is to have its first all-male partnership in the show's history, after TV chef John Whaite joins the line-up.
5	Sky has reached a partnership with ViacomCBS to launch Paramount+ on Sky Q in 2022.
10	A fire at the Bilsdale transmitting station in North Yorkshire disrupts television and radio signals for around one million people. Although the fire is extinguished, fire officials express concern for the structure's safety and establish an exclusion zone around the tower.
11	An episode of Love Island from 6 August featuring a confrontation between two contestants has attracted 24,763 complaints to Ofcom; the regulator is deciding whether to launch an inveatigation.
12	EastEnders actress Rose Ayling-Ellis is to become the first deaf competitor to appear on Strictly Come Dancing, it is announced.
13	Following the Bilsdale transmitter fire, mast operator Arqiva warn that households could face disruption for up to 14 days as they erect temporary masts to carry television and radio signals.
13	Amazon Studios confirms that production of its new The Lord of the Rings television series is to move from New Zealand to the United Kingdom after 20 years.
15	Following their success in the 2021 Summer Olympics, a homecoming celebration and concert for Team GB is held at Wembley Arena and aired on BBC One.
15	Speaking on Radio Cymru ahead of his 60th birthday, Huw Edwards says that he is considering his future as presenter of BBC News at Ten because presenting nightly news is "taxing", and he believes it is "fair" that viewers and colleagues have a change of presenter.
16	Channel 4 and ITN announces that Ben de Pear is to step down from Channel 4 News as editor.
23	Clive Myrie presents his first edition of Mastermind.
23	Millie Court and Liam Reardon win Series 7 of Love Island. The final is watched by an average audience of 2.8 million.
24	As the 2021 Summer Paralympics begins in Tokyo, Channel 4 warns it would not be possible to provide "anything like" the coverage it does of the event if the channel were to be privatised.
25	After the last series of Love Island received a record 35,500 complaints, ITV's head of programming, Kevin Lygo, rejects criticism of the programme and says the show is not failing in its duty of care.
26	Ofcom has fined Chinese-state owned China Global Television Network (CGTN) £200,000 for breaches of rules regarding fairness and privacy; the fine comes six months after CGTN's UK licence was suspended.
27	Footage of a 1973 interview with Eric Morecambe and Ernie Wise for a student television station in Norwich has been unearthed. In the programme they describe how they are "bored stiff" by Monty Python.
27	BBC Northern Ireland secures a three-year deal with Ulster's United Rugby Championship (URC) to screen home matches, and will air six games over the 2021–22 season.
28	Viewers unable to receive television signals for more than a month following the Bilsdale transmitter fire are to be offered a partial refund of their television licence. The majority of the 400,000 homes affected by the fire have had their signal restored, but a legal wrangle has delayed the completion of the work, scheduled to finish on this date.
30	Transport for London agrees to remove an advert from the side of its buses promoting the Channel 4 game show Naked Attraction following concerns the ads could place passengers at risk of sexual assault.
31	BBC journalist Sarah Rainsford returns to the UK after being permanently expelled from Russia for "the protection of the security of Russia".

=== September ===
Date	Event
1	After 39 years, Sky One closes and is replaced by two new channels, Sky Showcase and Sky Max. Sky Showcase will broadcast a selection of programmes from across Sky's portfolio of channels – Sky Witness, Sky Documentaries, Sky Crime, Sky Nature, Sky Arts, Sky Max, Sky Comedy, Sky History, Sky Kids, SyFy and E!. Sky Max will continue to broadcast content previously shown on Sky One.
1	CNN International is removed from Virgin Media and Freesat but continues to be available on Sky as a paid-for service for Sky customers.
1	Ofcom clears ITV's Good Morning Britain of breaching any rules over Piers Morgan's remarks about Meghan, Duchess of Sussex.
2	Late Night Mash makes its debut on the Dave channel, six months after the satirical Mash Report was cancelled by the BBC.
3	GB News have hired Isabel Oakeshott, a former journalist with the Sunday Times and Daily Mail to present its daily political programme, The Briefing. Her signing comes in the same week that GB News also announced that veteran Sky News home affairs and crime correspondent Mark White will join the fledgling news channel.
6	Channel 4 opens its new Leeds headquarters.
7	The BBC announces that Fran Unsworth, Director, News & Current Affairs for BBC News, is to leave in 2022 after 40 years.
8	Channel 4 announce that Married at First Sight contestant Nikita Jasmine has been removed from the programme for "unacceptable behaviour".
9	The 26th National Television Awards are held in London, at which Ant and Dec win their 20th consecutive Best Television Presenter Award. The Awards also see Kate Garraway win the new Authored Documentary Award for her film Finding Derek which tells the story of her husband, Derek Draper's battle with COVID-19.
9	BBC Four airs the 2021 Mercury Prize, which is won by Arlo Parks for her debut album Collapsed in Sunbeams.
9	Scottish Comedian Janey Godley is dropped from a Scottish Government health campaign urging people to wear face coverings and take lateral flow tests after historic tweets were published in which she made derogatory comments about a number of black performers.
10	Channel 4 agrees a last minute deal with Amazon Prime Video to show free live coverage of the 2021 US Open after Britain's Emma Raducanu reaches the women's singles final.
10	An episode of Hollyoaks starring, written and produced exclusively by Black talent airs on Channel 4 as part of the network's "Black to Front" day, marking Hollyoaks as the first soap opera to air an all-Black episode. Clothing, music and an original score for the episode were also sourced from Black creators.
13	Andrew Neil resigns as chairman and lead presenter of GB News. He subsequently tells BBC One's Question Time he left the channel because he felt he was in a "minority of one".
15	Following a cabinet reshuffle, former Health Minister Nadine Dorries is appointed Secretary of State for Digital, Culture, Media and Sport, replacing Oliver Dowden.
15	Louise Minchin co-presents her final edition of BBC One's BBC Breakfast.
16	News UK announce plans to launch talkTV in early 2022, using presenters from Talkradio and other News UK media.
16	Good Morning Britain former anchor Piers Morgan signs a global deal with Rupert Murdoch's Fox News Media.
16	Sara Pascoe is confirmed as the new presenter of The Great British Sewing Bee, replacing Joe Lycett.
16	Virgin Media O2 has announced its new streaming service launching at the end of this year to rival with Sky's streaming service, Now.
16	Postman Pat celebrates its 40th anniversary.
17	Elizabeth Estensen announces her retirement from acting. She confirms that she has filmed her final scenes after 22 years as Diane Sugden in Emmerdale.
20	CBeebies announces the appointment of George Webster, its first presenter with Down's Syndrome.
23	Derry Girls writer Lisa McGee confirms the upcoming third series will be the show's last.
23	The BBC announces that school drama Waterloo Road is set to return with a new series, six years after being cancelled by the network. The revival forms part of BBC's previously announced plans to better represent the United Kingdom.
24	The BBC announces that Russell T Davies is to return as showrunner of Doctor Who, after the departure of Chris Chibnall, for the programme's 60th anniversary in 2023 and beyond. Davies previously served as showrunner from 2005 to 2009.
24	Comedian Jack Whitehall announces he is stepping down as presenter of the BRIT Awards after four years.
25	A number of channels, including Channel 4 and Channel 5, briefly go off air following a fire alarm at a London distribution centre.
25	Both BBC One and BBC Two, along with BBC iPlayer, broadcast the Global Citizen Live: Music for the Planet concert.
30	E4 apologises to its viewers after broadcasting the previous day's episode of Married at First Sight instead of the series finale. The channel blames "ongoing technical problems" from a distribution centre fire the previous weekend and says it will reschedule the episode.

=== October ===
Date	Event
1	Television presenter Jeremy Stansfield, who had spinal and brain injuries after being used as a human crash test dummy during a 2013 edition of Bang Goes the Theory, wins £1.6m in damages from the BBC following a hearing at the High Court of England and Wales.
1	After more than 23 years on air, ITV Nightscreen is broadcast for the final time. It is replaced the following day by Unwind with ITV (branded as Unwind with STV on STV in Central Scotland and North of Scotland).
3	As Songs of Praise celebrates its 60th anniversary, The Queen sends a personal message congratulating "all those involved" in the programme.
4	ITV has announced actor and presenter John Barrowman will no longer appear on skating series Dancing on Ice.
7	Sky announces its new service Sky Glass, the world's first streaming television service. It is also Sky's first service that does not require a satellite dish. Sky Glass will be launched on 18 October.
7	Comedian and actress Rosie Jones, who has cerebral palsy, appears as a panellist on BBC One's Question Time. She later says that she has received a lot of online abuse about her appearance and speech after the programme is aired.
8	The BBC announces that it will be relocating production of Dragons' Den from Manchester to Glasgow.
9	Non-binary actor Arin Smethurst joins BBC One medical drama Casualty as paramedic Sah Brockner. Becoming the series' first transgender character.
12	Producers of Casualty, Coronation Street, Doctors, EastEnders, Emmerdale, Holby City and Hollyoaks announce a crossover devised to spread awareness of climate change. The crossover acts as a first for British continuing dramas and soaps and is set to air in November.
12	Welsh language channel S4C confirms there will be no free-to-air coverage of Wales's Autumn Internationals rugby matches. The channel had been in talks with Amazon Prime to show a Welsh language version of the games, but will now show only highlights.
13	Following the fire at the Bilsdale transmitting station, a new, smaller, temporary mast goes into service.
13	Comedian Robert Webb confirms he and his dance partner, Dianne Buswell, are withdrawing from Strictly Come Dancing for health reasons. Webb underwent heart surgery in 2019.
15	BBC One postpones episodes of Have I Got News for You and The Cleaner following the fatal stabbing of MP David Amess at a constituency surgery in Southend. They also pull an episode of Casualty scheduled to air the following day; the episode was set to feature Rash Masum (Neet Mohan) in a "horror stabbing" storyline.
18	A service of remembrance for Sir David Amess is held for fellow politicians at St Margaret's Church, Westminster, and streamed live by ITV on YouTube.
18	Newsreader George Alagiah is to take a break from television following "a further spread of cancer", his agent says.
18	Sky launches its new service Sky Glass and the world's first streaming television service. It is also Sky's first service without the requirement of a satellite dish.
18	GB News introduce hourly and half-hourly news bulletins following criticism the channel was "one long Jeremy Vine Show" or "Loose Women with Politics".
19	The BBC's Director of Distribution & Business Development Kieran Clifton, announces that a phased roll out of BBC One in HD across English regions in line with Northern Ireland, Scotland and Wales. Completed by the end of 2022. In a statement This will make for a better viewing experience and mean the end of having to switch over to a standard definition channel to watch regional programming. Instead, you'll be able to stay on BBC One HD to watch programmes like the evening news bulletins from your local area. in the following months, BBC iPlayer will also switch from standard definition to high definition for the regional versions of BBC One in England.
19	More than 500 people have complained to Ofcom about an outage of subtitles and audio description on Channel 4 programmes, which began three weeks ago following technical problems. Channel 4 says the problem is not likely to be resolved until mid-November.
20	The BBC rebrands for the first time since 1997 where the new logo is launched. It retained the basic form of the existing logo as predecessor, but with the blocks having more space between them and largely smaller lettering, and the lettering's typeface are changed from Gill Sans to the BBC's corporate font "Reith". BBC One, Two, Alba, and Scotland retained their respective idents with new logo, while BBC Three redesigned the graphics and BBC Four launched the first new idents for 16 years.
21	GB News have hired Sunday Express editor Mick Booker as editorial director.
21	Strictly Come Dancing contestant Judi Love and dance partner Graziano Di Prima will be absent from 23 October edition of the show after Love tested positive for the Coronavirus.
22	Piers Morgan announces he is to stop hosting his ITV show Life Stories and that Kate Garraway will replace him as host.
22	Channel 4 confirms that subtitles will return to Sky, Virgin Media and Freeview, with The Great British Bake Off and The Last Leg the first programmes to regain their subtitles.
28	Sky and Apple have confirmed a long-term agreement for Apple TV+ to become available on Sky Q and Sky Glass in mid-2022.
29	The BBC unveils a ten-point plan to make itself more impartial.
30	Jeff Stelling announces that he will be standing down as presenter of the Sky Sports football results show Soccer Saturday in May next year after 25 years in the role.

=== November ===
Date	Event
5	Actress Sarah Jayne Dunn speaks of how she is "shocked and disappointed" to be dropped from the cast of Hollyoaks after she uploaded pictures of herself to the adult website OnlyFans. Dunn says she did so after seeing photographs of herself used elsewhere and wanted to take back control.
7	Royal commentators have expressed their dismay at the announcement that Natascha McElhone, stepdaughter of IRA-supporting journalist Roy Greenslade, has been cast as Penelope Knatchbull, Countess Mountbatten in the fifth series of The Crown. Knatchbull is married to the grandson of Lord Louis Mountbatten of Burma, who was assassinated by the Provisional IRA in 1979.
7	BBC One airs a special edition of Countryfile focusing on the topic of climate change. The programme does not go down well with some viewers though, who take to social media to describe it as "woke".
8	Comedians Simon Evans and Dominic Frisby join GB News to present Headliners, a late-night show offering a light-hearted take on the following day's newspaper headlines. Tonight Live with Dan Wootton is also rebranded as Dan Wootton Tonight and shortened to two hours.
10	Adam Boulton confirms he is leaving Sky News at the end of the year after being with the network since its launch in 1989.
15	Strictly Come Dancing judge Craig Revel Horwood will miss 20 November edition of the show after testing positive for COVID.
15	BBC Northern Ireland presenter Donna Traynor announces her resignation after 33 years with the broadcaster.
16	NBCUniversal's streaming service, Peacock, launches on Sky and Now. The service will begin with a "soft launch" in the UK and Ireland coming at no additional cost for Sky TV customers and NOW Entertainment Members.
16	Star Trek: Discovery has been removed from Netflix just days before the season 4 premiere and will be available on Paramount+ at launch early next year.
17	Sarah Smith has been appointed BBC News North America editor, succeeding Jon Sopel.
17	Channel 4 has established a casting team to find a Scottish family to appear on Gogglebox following complaints from viewers and Scottish Conservative leader Douglas Ross.
18	The BBC publishes details of special programmes to celebrate its centenary in 2022. They include a three-part documentary series titled David Dimbleby's BBC: A Very British History, Here's One I Made Earlier celebrating 100 years of children's programming presented by Konnie Huq, and a programme presented by Harry Enfield and Paul Whitehouse titled The Love Box in Your Living Room that takes a humorous look at the BBC's history.
19	A security company reveals that as many as six million Sky routers had a significant software bug that could have allowed hackers to take control of home networks. The glitch, which is now fixed, existed for around 18 months and had the potential to affect anyone who did not change their router's default password.
19	Oscar-nominated British actress Cynthia Erivo is to appear as a guest judge Strictly Come Dancing after Craig Revel Horwood caught Coronavirus.
19	Andrew Marr is to leave the BBC after 21 years to join Global Radio, where he will present on LBC and Classic FM.
19	News UK Broadcasting makes two senior appointments ahead of the launch of talkTV in 2022; Vivek Sharma, former Deputy Editor of This Morning and Series Editor of Steph's Packed Lunch, who becomes Executive Producer, News UK Broadcasting, with responsibility for talkTV's output; and Ben Briscoe, Assistant Editor at Good Morning Britain, who becomes Series Editor for News UK's Piers Morgan Show.
19	The 2021 Children in Need telethon takes place; £39m has been raised by the end of the evening.
21	ITV's An Audience with... returns for a one-off special, An Audience with Adele, to coincide with the release of Adele's new album, 30.
21	It is revealed that Emmerdale actors Isobel Hodgins and Matthew Wolfenden have not appeared on for several months following a "race row". The actors are accused of mocking the accent of a mixed race actress, as well as making an "inappropriate comment".
23	Giuseppe Dell'Anno is named the winner of series 12 of The Great British Bake Off.
23	GB News have signed Sky News presenter Stephen Dixon to present a show on the channel from December.
24	Channel 4 announces it has reached a deal with the Rugby Football League to show 10 live Super League matches per season, including two end of season play-off matches. The deal will come into effect from the 2022 season, with its first live match being Leeds Rhinos vs Warrington Wolves on Saturday 12 February 2022.
25	Ofcom confirms BBC Three will return as a television channel from February 2022.
25	Conservative MP Nick Fletcher claims men turning to crime is linked to women playing traditional male roles, such as The Doctor in Doctor Who, arguing that "female replacements" are robbing boys of good role models and leaving them with only criminals and gangsters.
25	Television journalist and presenter Richard Madeley withdraws from I'm a Celebrity...Get Me Out of Here! after being admitted to hospital due to an unspecified illness, resulting in him breaking the show's Coronavirus safety bubble.
26	Strictly Come Dancing judge Motsi Mabuse will miss the upcoming weekend's edition of the show after coming into close contact with a person who tested positive for Coronavirus.
26	I'm a Celebrity...Get Me Out of Here! abandons the live element of that day's edition because of weather warnings issued by the Met Office ahead of Storm Arwen.
26	Kirsty Gallacher announces she is "stepping back" from her presenting role on the GB News show The Great British Breakfast after discovering a benign tumour in her ear canal.
27	ITV announces that two episodes of I'm a Celebrity...Get Me Out of Here! have been cancelled without crowning a clear winner because of weather conditions caused by Storm Arwen; the show's contestants are also removed from Gwrych Castle.
29	ITV confirms that live episodes of I'm a Celebrity...Get Me Out of Here! will return from the following day after damage caused by Storm Arwen is repaired.

=== December ===
Date	Event
1	Talking Pictures TV launches the TPTV Encore catch-up service.
1	"Gruesome and violent" Emmerdale scenes showing Meena Jutla (Paige Sandhu) murdering Ben Tucker (Simon Lennon) with a kayak oar receive 73 complaints to Ofcom.
2	Technical problems result in Freeview customers in London and Manchester losing their ITV and Channel 4 signals.
3	ITV confirms that two intruders were removed from the set of I'm a Celebrity...Get Me Out of Here! during Storm Arwen, the second time the set has been breached during the current series. The show's contestants were present at the time, having been removed due to the storm.
3	Further technical problems lead to Channel 4 pulling the day's edition of Countdown and Moneybags at the last minute; they were replaced by Find It, Fix It, Flog It and Location, Location, Location.
7	UK broadcasters commit to avoiding the use of the acronym BAME in favour of more specific terms "wherever possible".
9	Channel 4 reaches an agreement with Sky Sports to broadcast the final race of the Formula 1 season, the 2021 Abu Dhabi Grand Prix, free to air. The race features the much anticipated title decider between Britain's Lewis Hamilton and his main rival Max Verstappen, who begin the race level on points in the standings.
10	GB News have signed Eamonn Holmes to begin presenting a show in 2022. The announcement comes as it is confirmed Simon McCoy has left the channel.
12	Emmerdale actor Danny Miller wins Series 21 of I'm a Celebrity...Get Me Out of Here!.
13	The BFI announce that a record £4bn recovery was spent on television production in the UK. TV production slumped during the Impact of the Coronavirus pandemic on TV. The £4bn in 2021 was compared to the £2.3bn figures spent in the same period between 2018 and 2019.
14	GB News have signed Conservative commentator Darren Grimes to present a weekend show titled Real Britain with Darren Grimes starting in 2022.
17	Television presenter AJ Odudu is forced to withdraw from the nineteenth series of Strictly Come Dancing one day before the final along with her professional partner Kai Widdrington following ligament damage to her ankle.
18	EastEnders actress Rose Ayling-Ellis wins the nineteenth series of Strictly Come Dancing alongside her professional partner Giovanni Pernice. Ayling-Ellis becomes the first deaf contestant to win the series, beating the first male same-sex couple John Whaite and Johannes Radebe in the final. The programme is watched by a peak audience of 12.3 million, giving BBC One a 57.8% audience share.
18	The Weakest Link returns once again to TV screens with Romesh Ranganathan taking over as host 4 years after the only one-off special episode.
19	2021 US Open winner Emma Raducanu is named the 2021 BBC Sports Personality of the Year.
19	A technical glitch forces GB News off air for three hours, from 6.16am to 9.17am, during which the channel plays trailers and pre-recorded interviews.
19	Emmerdale actor Aaron Anthony is reported to have quit the soap following a "race row" in November 2021 which left him feeling "angry" about the incident.
20	The BBC confirms Laura Kuenssberg will step down as its political editor from Easter 2022 to take on a number of other roles in the organisation.
20	ITV confirms that Good Morning Britain will go on hiatus over the Christmas period as a result of rapid increase in the Omicron variant cases. A special edition of the programme is planned for Christmas Day, but editions scheduled for 29, 30 and 31 December will not go ahead.
21	GB News have hired former TV-am presenter Anne Diamond to co-present their weekend breakfast programme alongside Stephen Dixon from Saturday 8 January.
23	Jon Snow presents his final edition of Channel 4 News after 32 years with the broadcaster.
25	BBC Two airs a lost edition of The Morecambe and Wise Show from Christmas 1970. The programme was thought to be lost after being deleted by the BBC so as to reuse expensive tape, but was found by Eric Morecambe's son, Gary.
26	Overnight viewing figures indicate the Queen's Christmas Message was the most watched programme on Christmas Day with 8.96 million viewers. The Christmas specials of Strictly Come Dancing and Call the Midwife are second and third, giving BBC One prime position in the Christmas Day ratings battle.
30	The BBC says an interview with lawyer Alan Dershowitz that was aired following the previous day's conviction of Ghislaine Maxwell for helping to groom underage girls for Jeffrey Epstein did not meet its editorial standards for impartiality.
31	BBC One airs The Big New Years & Years Eve Party, which sees Olly Alexander of Years & Years joined by Kylie Minogue and the Pet Shop Boys to see out 2021 and welcome in 2022. London's annual fireworks display is also aired at midnight.

== Debuts ==
=== BBC ===
Date	Debut	Channel
1 January	The Serpent	BBC One
3 January	A Perfect Planet	BBC One
3 January	A Teacher	BBC Two
4 January	Rick Stein's Cornwall	BBC Two
7 January	Pooch Perfect	BBC One
11 January	B.O.T. and the Beasties	CBeebies
12 January	Bamous	BBC Three
24 January	Incredible Journeys with Simon Reeve	BBC Two
25 January	Lightning	BBC Two
12 February	My Mum Tracy Beaker	CBBC
21 February	Bloodlands	BBC One
21 February	Chris Packham's Animal Einsteins	BBC Two
24 February	Gordon Ramsay's Bank Balance	BBC One
28 February	Life in Colour	BBC One
1 March	My Unique B&B	BBC Two
24 March	This Is My House	BBC One
29 March	Save and Remade	BBC Two
10 April	I Can See Your Voice	BBC One
13 April	All That Glitters: Britain's Next Jewellery Star	BBC Two
19 April	Bluey	CBeebies
25 April	Starstruck	BBC Three
26 April	Dom Digs In	BBC One
9 May	The Pursuit of Love	BBC One
9 May	Journeys into the Wild	BBC Two
9 May	Gods of Snooker	BBC Two
10 May	Unbeatable	BBC One
10 May	Three Families	BBC One
12 May	Danny Boy	BBC Two
17 May	The Pact	BBC One
24 May	Great British Photography Challenge	BBC Four
30 May	Brian Cox's Adventures in Space and Time	BBC Two
6 June	Time	BBC One
11 June	Crouchy's Year-Late Euros: Live	BBC One
17 June	Together	BBC Two
27 June	Live at Worthy Farm: Backstage	BBC Two
27 June	Live at Worthy Farm	BBC Two
12 August	The Watch	BBC Two
18 August	Jay's Yorkshire Workshop	BBC Two
22 August	When Ruby Wax Met...	BBC Two
29 August	Vigil	BBC One
3 September	Tonight with Target	BBC Three
6 September	Fever Pitch: The Rise of the Premier League	BBC Two
10 September	The Cleaner	BBC One
10 September	The North Water	BBC Two
13 September	Take a Hike	BBC Two
30 September	Show Me the Honey	CBBC
3 October	The Earthshot Prize	BBC One
3 October	The Mating Game	BBC One
3 October	Ridley Road	BBC One
4 October	Blair & Brown: The New Labour Revolution	BBC Two
14 October	Shop Well for the Planet?	BBC One
17 October	I Like the Way U Move	BBC Three
25 October	Expert Witness	BBC One
25 October	The Outlaws	BBC One
18 October	The Trick	BBC One
27 October	Universe	BBC Two
31 October	Showtrial	BBC One
4 November	Sort Your Life Out	BBC One
8 November	The Tournament	BBC One
8 November	Clean It, Fix It	BBC One
10 November	Life at 50 °C	BBC Two
11 November	Mary Berry – Love to Cook	BBC Two
11 November	Nadiya's Fast Flavours	BBC Two
14 November	The Lakes with Simon Reeve	BBC Two
24 November	Hope Street	BBC One Northern Ireland
29 November	Virtually Home	BBC One
5 December	You Don't Know Me	BBC One
13 December	The Beaker Girls	CBBC
19 December	The Girl Before	BBC One
24 December	Shaun the Sheep: The Flight Before Christmas	BBC One
25 December	Superworm	BBC One
26 December	Around the World in 80 Days	BBC One
26 December	A Very British Scandal	BBC One

=== ITV ===
Date	Debut	Channel
1 January	Lingo	ITV
3 January	And Finally... with Trevor McDonald	ITV
4 January	The Cabins	ITV2
6 January	Cornwall and Devon Walks with Julia Bradbury	ITV
9 January	Paul Sinha's TV Showdown	ITV
11 January	The Pembrokeshire Murders	ITV
17 January	Finding Alice	ITV
30 January	Simply Raymond Blanc	ITV
14 March	Grace	ITV
10 April	Game of Talents	ITV
12 April	Too Close	ITV
26 April	Viewpoint	ITV
10 May	Secret Crush	ITV2
29 May	The Masked Dancer	ITV
10 July	The Void	ITV
13 July	Wild China with Ray Mears	ITV
13 July	Cooking with the Stars	ITV
14 July	Craig and Bruno's Great British Road Trips	ITV
16 July	Apocalypse Wow	ITV2
18 July	Professor T.	ITV
5 August	Buffering	ITV2
30 August	Stephen	ITV
6 September	Ready to Mingle	ITV2
7 September	Wonders of Scotland with David Hayman	ITV
11 September	Paul O'Grady's Saturday Night Line-Up	ITV
20 September	Manhunt: The Night Stalker	ITV
29 September	Hollington Drive	ITV
2 October	Unwind with ITV	ITV
10 October	The Larkins	ITV
10 October	Angela Black	ITV
11 October	Bling	ITV
20 October	Peckham's Finest	ITV2
25 October	The Long Call	ITV
30 October	Moneyball	ITV
31 October	The Pet Show	ITV
7 November	Sitting on a Fortune	ITV
8 November	The Tower	ITV
8 November	Bad Boy Chiller Crew	ITV2
12 December	Walk the Line	ITV

=== Channel 4 ===
Date	Debut	Channel
22 January	It's a Sin	Channel 4
26 January	Secret Safari: Into the Wild	Channel 4
31 January	Temptation Island	E4
8 February	Undercover Police: Hunting Paedophiles	Channel 4
8 February	Darcey Bussell's Wild Coasts of Scotland	More4
22 February	Below Deck Mediterranean	E4
1 March	Drawers Off	Channel 4
9 March	Trip Hazard: My Great British Adventure	Channel 4
15 April	Frank of Ireland	Channel 4
1 May	The Great Garden Revolution	Channel 4
4 May	The Money Maker	Channel 4
10 May	The Answer Trap	Channel 4
14 May	Tom Allen's Quizness	Channel 4
20 May	We Are Lady Parts	Channel 4
26 May	Before We Die	Channel 4
30 May	Yr Amgueddfa	S4C
9 June	In the Footsteps of Killers	Channel 4
15 April	The Secret World Of...	Channel 4
13 August	Deceit	Channel 4
30 August	One Night Stand?	E4
7 September	The Holden Girls: Mandy & Myrtle	E4
16 September	Help	Channel 4
22 September	Sex Actually with Alice Levine	Channel 4
27 September	The Perfect Pitch	Channel 4
5 October	Murder Island	Channel 4
14 October	Complaints Welcome	Channel 4
20 October	The Love Trap	Channel 4
21 October	Handmade: Britain's Best Woodworker	Channel 4
24 October	Joe Lycett vs the Oil Giant	Channel 4
25 October	Celebrity Ghost Trip	E4
7 November	Close to Me	Channel 4
8 November	Moneybags	Channel 4
16 November	Miriam and Alan: Lost in Scotland	Channel 4
22 November	Bidding Wars	Channel 4
16 December	I Literally Just Told You	Channel 4
24 December	The Greatest Snowman	Channel 4
25 December	Terry Pratchett's The Abominable Snow Baby	Channel 4

=== Channel 5 ===
Date	Debut	Channel
7 January	Natural History Museum: World of Wonder	Channel 5
8 January	Susan Calman's Grand Days Out	Channel 5
14 January	Hadrian's Wall with Robson Green	Channel 5
1 February	The Drowning	Channel 5
4 April	Secrets of the Royal Palaces	Channel 5
5 April	Intruder	Channel 5
1 June	Anne Boleyn	Channel 5
12 July	Lie With Me	Channel 5
16 October	The Madame Blanc Mysteries	Channel 5
4 November	Dalgliesh	Channel 5

=== Other channels ===
Date	Debut	Channel
2 February	Mel Giedroyc: Unforgivable	Dave
4 February	ZeroZeroZero	Sky Atlantic
6 March	Elliott from Earth	Cartoon Network
15 March	Goldie's Oldies	Nickelodeon
15 March	Zero Chill	Netflix
26 March	The Irregulars	Netflix
30 April	Intergalactic	Sky One
12 April	Newton's Cradle	Dubai One / MBC 4 / MBC Action / MBC+ Variety / Shahid VIP
5 May	Bloods	Sky Comedy
8 May	Murder, They Hope	Gold
3 June	Liverpool Narcos	Sky Documentaries
11 June	Clarkson's Farm	Amazon Prime
17 August	Annika	Alibi
7 September	Octonauts: Above & Beyond	Netflix
10 September	Wolfe	Sky Max
13 September	The Complaints Department	Comedy Central
24 September	Wolfboy and the Everything Factory	Apple TV+
29 September	Outsiders	Dave
12 October	Question Team	Dave
7 November	Shark with Steve Backshall	Sky Nature
18 November	Crime	BritBox
21 November	The 45 Rules of Divorce	MBC 4 / MBC+ Variety / Dubai One / Shahid VIP / OSN / OSN Yahala / MBC Max / / Zee Aflam
5 December	Confessions of a Fashionista	MBC 4 / MBC+ Variety / Shahid VIP / MBC Max / / Zee Aflam
7 December	Landscapers	Sky Atlantic
23 December	Hansel & Gretel: After Ever After	Sky Max
24 December	The Amazing Mr. Blunden	Sky Max
31 December	Stay Close	Netflix

== Channels and streaming services ==
=== New channels ===
Date	Channel
6 January	Sky Cinema Premiere +1
1 February	SportyStuff TV
13 June	GB News
9 July	That's TV Gold
1 September	Sky Max
1 September	Sky Showcase

=== New streaming services ===
Date	Channel
23 February	Star (via Disney+)
29 September	IMDb TV
16 November	Peacock
1 December	TPTV Encore

=== Defunct channels/streaming services ===
Date	Channel
6 January	Discovery Home & Health
6 January	Discovery Shed
6 January	Sky Cinema Disney/Five Star Movies
1 March	Lifetime
8 April	BET
30 April	Vice
30 June	Fox
1 September	Sky One

=== Rebranding channels/streaming services ===
Date	Old name	New name
16 March	Now TV	Now
25 May	Sony Channel	Great! TV
25 May	Sony Movies	Great! Movies
25 May	Sony Movies Action	Great! Movies Action
25 May	Sony Movies Classic	Great! Movies Classic
20 October	BBC iPlayer	iPlayer

== Television programmes ==
=== Changes of network affiliation ===
Programme	Moved from	Moved to
Celebs on the Farm	5Star	MTV
Star	5Star	Disney+
Last Man Standing	5Star	Disney+
Genius	National Geographic	Disney+
The Americans	ITV Encore	Disney+
Family Guy (First run rights)	ITV2	Disney+
The Walking Dead	Fox	Disney+
The Orville	Fox	Disney+
War of the Worlds	Fox	Disney+
Atlanta	Fox	Disney+
American Horror Story	Fox	Disney+
American Dad! (First run rights)	Fox	Disney+
Mr Inbetween	Fox	Disney+
NCIS	Fox	Disney+
Dexter	Fox	Sky Atlantic
In Treatment	Channel 4	Sky Atlantic
Married at First Sight	Channel 4	E4
Duncanville (First run rights)	Channel 4	E4
Eggheads	BBC Two	Channel 5
Never Mind The Buzzcocks	BBC Two	Sky Max
The Flash	Sky One	Sky Max
Supergirl	Sky One	Sky Max
Legends of Tomorrow	Sky One	Sky Max
The Russell Howard Hour	Sky One	Sky Max
A Discovery of Witches	Sky One	Sky Max
COBRA	Sky One	Sky Max
A League of Their Own	Sky One	Sky Max
We're Here	Sky One	Sky Max
Manifest	Sky One	Sky Max
Temple	Sky One	Sky Max
Brassic	Sky One	Sky Max
Colony	Sky One	Netflix
Code 404	Sky One	Sky Comedy
Hitmen: Reloaded	Sky One	Sky Comedy
Curb Your Enthusiasm	Sky Atlantic	Sky Comedy
Black Monday	Sky Atlantic	Sky Comedy
Barry	Sky Atlantic	Sky Comedy
Alex Rider	Amazon Prime Video	IMDb TV
New Amsterdam	Amazon Prime Video	Sky Witness
The Resident	Universal TV	Sky Witness
Private Eyes	Universal TV	Sky Witness
Slasher	Pick	Shudder
The 100	E4	4Music
Zoey's Extraordinary Playlist	E4	The Roku Channel
Canada's Drag Race	BBC Three	WOW Presents Plus
Young Rock	Sky Comedy	Peacock
Will & Grace	Comedy Central	Peacock

=== Returning this year after a break of one year or longer ===
Programme	Date(s) of original removal	Original channel(s)	Date of return	New channel(s)
Lingo	14 July 1988	ITV	1 January 2021	N/A (same as original)
RuPaul's Drag Race UK	21 November 2019	BBC One; BBC Three	14 January 2021	N/A (same as original)
Back	11 October 2017	Channel 4	21 January 2021	N/A (same as original)
Dead Pixels	2 May 2019	E4	26 January 2021	N/A (same as original)
Celebrities on the Farm	6 September 2019	5Star	8 February 2021	MTV
The Boat Race	1 April 1939; 7 April 2019	BBC One; BBC World News	4 April 2021	N/A (same as original)
Ackley Bridge	6 August 2019	Channel 4	19 April 2021	N/A (same as original)
Eurovision Song Contest	18 May 2019	BBC One; BBC Four	18 May 2021	N/A (same as original)
European Football Championship	10 July 2016	BBC One; ITV	11 June 2021	N/A (same as original)
BBC Wimbledon	8 July 1939; 14 July 2019	BBC One; BBC Two	28 June 2021	N/A (same as original)
Love Island	23 February 2020	ITV2	28 June 2021	N/A (same as original)
The A List	25 October 2018	BBC iPlayer	25 June 2021	Netflix
Undercover Boss	20 August 2014	Channel 4	5 August 2021	ITV (as Undercover Big Boss)
Changing Rooms	28 December 2004	BBC Two; BBC One	18 August 2021	Channel 4
The Mash Report	8 May 2020	BBC Two	2 September 2021	Dave (as Late Night Mash)
The Big Breakfast	29 March 2002	Channel 4	10 September 2021	N/A (same as original)
Never Mind the Buzzcocks	15 December 2014	BBC Two	21 September 2021	Sky Max
Stath Lets Flats	23 September 2019	Channel 4	26 October 2021	N/A (same as original)
GamesMaster	3 February 1998	Channel 4	21 November 2021	E4
The Weakest Link	31 March 2012; 17 November 2017	BBC One; BBC Two	18 December 2021	N/A (same as original)

== Continuing television programmes ==
=== 1920s ===
Programme	Date
BBC Wimbledon	1927–1939, 1946–2019, 2021–present

=== 1930s ===
Programme	Date
BBC Cricket	1939, 1946–1999, 2020–present

=== 1950s ===
Programme	Date
Panorama	1953–present
Crackerjack!	1955–1984, 2020–2021
Eurovision Song Contest	1956–present
The Sky at Night	1957–present
Final Score	1958–present
Blue Peter	1958–present

=== 1960s ===
Programme	Date
Coronation Street	1960–present
Points of View	1961–present
Songs of Praise	1961–present
University Challenge	1962–1987, 1994–present
Doctor Who	1963–1989, 1996, 2005–present
Horizon	1964–present
Match of the Day	1964–present
Top of the Pops	1964–present
Gardeners' World	1968–present
A Question of Sport	1968, 1970–present

=== 1970s ===
Programme	Date
Emmerdale	1972–present
Mastermind (including Celebrity Mastermind)	1972–1997, 2003–present
Newsround	1972–present
Football Focus	1974–present
Pobol y Cwm	1974–present
Arena	1975–present
One Man and His Dog	1976–present
Top Gear	1977–present
Ski Sunday	1978–present
Blankety Blank	1979–1990, 1997–2002, 2016, 2020–present
Antiques Roadshow	1979–present
Question Time	1979–present

=== 1980s ===
Programme	Date
Children in Need	1980–present
Countdown	1982–present
ITV Breakfast	1983–present
Thomas & Friends	1984–2021
EastEnders	1985–present
Comic Relief	1985–present
Catchphrase	1986–2002, 2013–present
Casualty	1986–present
Red Dwarf	1988–1999, 2009, 2012–present
This Morning	1988–present
Countryfile	1988–present

=== 1990s ===
Programme	Date
The Crystal Maze	1990–1995, 2016–2021
Have I Got News for You	1990–present
MasterChef	1990–2001, 2005–present
ITV News Meridian	1993–present
Top of the Pops 2	1994–present
Hollyoaks	1995–present
Soccer AM	1995–present
National Television Awards	1995–2008, 2010–present
Silent Witness	1996–present
Midsomer Murders	1997–present
Teletubbies	1997–2001, 2015–present
Y Clwb Rygbi	1997–present
Classic Emmerdale	1998–2004, 2019–present
ITV Nightscreen	1998–2021
Who Wants to Be a Millionaire?	1998–2014, 2018–present
Holby City	1999–2022
Loose Women	1999–present

=== 2000s ===
Programme	Date
2000
Bargain Hunt	2000–present
BBC Breakfast	2000–present
Click	2000–present
Doctors	2000–present
A Place in the Sun	2000–present
Unreported World	2000–present
2001
BBC South East Today	2001–present
2002
Escape to the Country	2002–present
I'm a Celebrity...Get Me Out of Here!	2002–present
Inside Out	2002–present
Ant & Dec's Saturday Night Takeaway	2002–2009, 2013–2018, 2020–present
Most Haunted	2002–2010, 2014–present
River City	2002–2026
Saturday Kitchen	2002–present
2003
QI	2003–present
Eggheads	2003–present
Homes Under the Hammer	2003–present
Traffic Cops	2003–present
2004
Match of the Day 2	2004–present
Strictly Come Dancing	2004–present
The Big Fat Quiz of the Year	2004–present
The Gadget Show	2004–present
Live at the Apollo	2004–present
Newswatch	2004–present
Peppa Pig	2004–present
Strictly Come Dancing: It Takes Two	2004–present
Who Do You Think You Are?	2004–present
2005
8 Out of 10 Cats	2005–present
Coach Trip	2005–2006, 2009–present
The Andrew Marr Show	2005–present
The Adventure Show	2005–present
Dragons' Den	2005–present
The Hotel Inspector	2005–present
Mock the Week	2005–present
Pocoyo	2005–present
Springwatch	2005–present
2006
Banged Up Abroad	2006–present
Dancing on Ice	2006–2014, 2018–present
Dickinson's Real Deal	2006–present
Horrid Henry	2006–present
Monkey Life	2006–present
Not Going Out	2006–present
The One Show	2006–present
People & Power	2006–present
2007	2006–present
Would I Lie to You?	2007–present
The Big Questions	2007–present
Don't Tell the Bride	2007–present
The Graham Norton Show	2007–present
Heir Hunters	2007–present
London Ink	2007–present
Shaun the Sheep	2007–present
2008	2007–present
An Là	2008–present
Celebrity Juice	2008–present
Chuggington	2008–present
Police Interceptors	2008–present
Rubbernecker	2008–present
Seachd Là	2008–present
2009	2008–present
Pointless	2009–present
The Chase	2009–present
Piers Morgan's Life Stories	2009–present
Rip Off Britain	2009–present

=== 2010s ===
Programme	Date
2010
The Great British Bake Off	2010–present
Great British Railway Journeys	2010–present
A League of Their Own	2010–present
Lorraine	2010–present
Luther	2010–present
The Only Way Is Essex	2010–present
Sunday Morning Live	2010–present
2011
All Over the Place	2011–present
Junior Bake Off	2011, 2013, 2015–16, 2019, 2021–present
Top Boy	2011–2013, 2019–2023
Made in Chelsea	2011–present
Match of the Day Kickabout	2011–2021
Vera	2011–2025
Show Me What You're Made Of	2011–present
24 Hours in A&E	2011–present
2012
8 Out of 10 Cats Does Countdown	2012–present
Endeavour	2012–2023
Call the Midwife	2012–present
Great Continental Railway Journeys	2012–present
Stand Up To Cancer	2012–present
The Voice UK	2012–present
Tipping Point	2012–present
Paul O'Grady: For the Love of Dogs	2012–2023
Operation Ouch!	2012–present
2013
The Dog Rescuers	2013–present
The Dumping Ground	2013–present
Shetland	2013–present
Still Open All Hours	2013–present
Two Doors Down	2013, 2016–present
2014
Agatha Raisin	2014–present
The Dog Ate My Homework	2014–present
GPs: Behind Closed Doors	2014–present
The Great British Bake Off: An Extra Slice	2014–present
Good Morning Britain	2014–present
Happy Valley	2014–present
Judge Rinder	2014–present
Grantchester	2014–present
The Next Step	2014–present
Scrambled!	2014–2021
24 Hours in Police Custody	2014–present
2015
The Dengineers	2015–present
Eat Well for Less?	2015–present
Hunted	2015–present
Love Island	2015–present
Nightmare Tenants, Slum Landlords	2015–present
Safe House	2015–present
SAS: Who Dares Wins	2015–present
Taskmaster	2015–present
Travel Man	2015–present
10,000 BC	2015–present
2016
Bake Off: The Professionals	2016–present
Cash Trapped	2016–2017, 2019–present
Tenable	2016–2021
Celebs Go Dating	2016–present
Class Dismissed	2016–2017, 2019–present
The Crown	2016–2017, 2019–2020, 2022–2023
Got What It Takes?	2016–2021
Marcella	2016–present
Naked Attraction	2016–present
Upstart Crow	2016–present
The Windsors	2016–present
2017
Ackley Bridge	2017–2022
All Round to Mrs. Brown's	2017–present
Back	2017–present
Beyond 100 Days	2017–present
The Good Karma Hospital	2017–present
Impossible	2017–2021
Love Island: Aftersun	2017–present
The Playlist	2017–2022
The Repair Shop	2017–present
Richard Osman's House of Games	2017–present
Strike	2017–present
2018
The A List	2018, 2021
Britannia	2018–2021
Celebs on the Farm	2018–2021
The Circle	2018–2021
Bulletproof	2018–2021
Derry Girls	2018–2022
A Discovery of Witches	2018–2022
In My Skin	2018–2021
Killing Eve	2018–2022
Mark Kermode's Secrets of Cinema	2018–present
Peston	2018–present
Shakespeare & Hathaway: Private Investigators	2018–present
Stath Lets Flats	2018–present
There She Goes	2018–present
2019
Almost Never	2019–2021
Glow Up: Britain's Next Make-Up Star	2019–present
The Hit List	2019–present
Ladhood	2019–2022
RuPaul's Drag Race UK	2019–present
Mandy	2019–present
Sex Education	2019–present
After Life	2019–2022

=== 2020s ===
Programme	Date
2020
Alan Carr's Epic Gameshow	2020–2022
Beat the Chasers	2020–present
Feel Good	2020–2021
Malory Towers	2020–present
Michael McIntyre's The Wheel	2020–present
The Masked Singer	2020–present
McDonald & Dodds	2020–2024
Noughts + Crosses	2020–2022
Trying	2020–present

== Ending this year ==
Date(s)	Programme	Channel(s)	Debut(s)
10 January	Last Woman on Earth with Sara Pascoe	BBC Two	2020
13 January	The Pembrokeshire Murders	ITV	2021
15 January	Hollyoaks Favourites	E4	2020
20 January	Thomas and Friends	Channel 5	1984
31 January	A Perfect Planet	BBC One	2021
27 December	BBC London and South East	BBC One London/BBC One South East	2020
3 February	Bulletproof	Sky One	2018
4 February	The Drowning	Channel 5	2021
11 February	Can't Get You Out of My Head	BBC iPlayer	2021
14 February	The Serpent	BBC One	2021
17 February	Behind Her Eyes	Netflix	2021
19 February	It's a Sin	Channel 4	2021
4 March	Pooch Perfect	BBC One	2021
4 March	Life Cinematic	BBC Four	2020
5 March	Crackerjack!	BBC One & CBBC	1955 & 2020
15 March	Zero Chill	Netflix	2021
26 March	The Irregulars	Netflix	2021
28 March	Chris Packham's Animal Einsteins	BBC Two	2021
9 April	The Circle	Channel 4	2018
11 April	Scrambled!	CITV	2014
23 April	Impossible	BBC One	2017
26 April	Greta Thunberg: A Year to Change the World	BBC One	2021
30 April	Viewpoint	ITV	2021
11 May	Three Families	BBC One	2021
12 May	Newton's Cradle	Dubai One / MBC 4 / MBC Action / MBC+ Variety / Shahid VIP	2021
23 May	The Pursuit of Love	BBC One	2021
23 May	Gods of Snooker	BBC Two	2021
3 June	Anne Boleyn	Channel 5	2021
4 June	Feel Good	Channel 4/Netflix	2020
20 June	Time	BBC One	2021
24 June	BBC News with Katty and Christian	BBC News	2017
13 July	Got What It Takes?	CBBC	2016
22 August	Baptiste	BBC One	2019
3 September	Deceit	Channel 4	2021
26 September	Serengeti II	BBC One	2019
27 September	Fever Pitch: The Rise of the Premier League	BBC Two	2021
1 October	ITV Nightscreen	ITV/ITV2/ITV3/ITV4/ITVBe/STV/UTV	1998
8 October	The North Water	BBC Two	2021
20 October	Hollington Drive	ITV	2021
24 October	Ridley Road	BBC One	2021
31 October	The Mating Game	BBC One	2021
7 November	In My Skin	BBC Three	2018
15 November	The Architecture the Railways Built	Yesterday	2020
12 December	Close to Me	Channel 4	2021
19 December	The Andrew Marr Show	BBC One	2005
22 December	The Girl Before	BBC One	2021
28 December	A Very British Scandal	BBC One	2021
28 December	Landscapers	Sky Atlantic	2021
31 December	Stay Close	Netflix	2021

== Deaths ==
Date	Name	Age	Broadcast credibility
1 January	Mark Eden	92	Actor (Coronation Street)
1 January	Barry Austin	52	Reported to be Britain's fattest man (The Fattest Man in Britain)
3 January	Barbara Shelley	88	Actress (Doctor Who, EastEnders)
7 January	Michael Apted	79	Director, producer, writer and actor (Up, Coal Miner's Daughter, Gorillas in the Mist, The World Is Not Enough, Enigma)
18 January	Andy Gray	61	Actor and comedy writer (River City)
21 January	Mick Norcross	57	Businessman and reality television star (The Only Way is Essex)
5 February	Jean Bayless	88	Actress (The Sound of Music, Crossroads)
11 February	Frank Mills	93	Actor (Big Deal, Coronation Street)
24 February	Ronald Pickup	80	Actor (Doctor Who, The Crown)
28 February	Johnny Briggs	85	Actor (Coronation Street, Man About the House, Carry On England)
1 March	Ian St John	82	Footballer and broadcaster (Saint and Greavsie)
3 March	Nicola Pagett	75	Actress (Upstairs, Downstairs)
8 March	Trevor Peacock	89	Actor, screenwriter and songwriter (The Vicar of Dibley)
13 March	Murray Walker	97	Motorsport commentator (BBC Sport, Channel 4, ITV Sport)
16 March	Sabine Schmitz	51	Motor racing driver and television presenter (Top Gear)
5 April	Paul Ritter	54	Actor (Friday Night Dinner, No Offence, Chernobyl)
9 April	Arthur Cox	87	Actor (Doctor Who, Yes Minister)
9 April	Nikki Grahame	38	Television personality, model, author, (Big Brother, Princess Nikki, Big Brother Canada)
12 April	André Maranne	94	Actor (The Pink Panther, The Square Peg, Night Train to Paris)
16 April	Edwin Apps	89	Actor (The Bargee, The Messenger: The Story of Joan of Arc, Vatel) and writer (All Gas and Gaiters)
16 April	Helen McCrory	52	Actress (Peaky Blinders, Harry Potter, The Queen, Skyfall, Doctor Who)
20 May	Freddy Marks	71	Actor, singer and musician (Z-Cars, The Sweeney, Rainbow, Rod, Jane and Freddy)
26 May	Shane Briant	74	Actor (Hammer Films, Van der Valk, The Sweeney, The Naked Civil Servant)
3 June	Damaris Hayman	91	Actress (Doctor Who, Steptoe and Son, Love Thy Neighbour)
7 June	Ben Roberts	70	Actor (The Bill, The Professionals, Doctors, Casualty)
11 June	Lucinda Riley	55	Actress (Auf Wiedersehen, Pet)
23 June	Jackie Lane	79	Actress (Doctor Who, Compact)
June	Pete McGarry	71	Reality show participant (Gogglebox)
3 July	Anne Stallybrass	82	Actress (The Six Wives of Henry VIII, Heartbeat, Diana: Her True Story)
9 July	Jonathan Coleman	65	Radio and television presenter (Sunrise)
18 July	Tom O'Connor	81	Comedian and game show host (Crosswits, The Zodiac Game, Name That Tune, Password, Gambit)
24 July	Alfie Scopp	101	Actor (Tales of the Wizard of Oz, Rudolph the Red-Nosed Reindeer)
27 July	Candy Davis	59	Actress, author, model (Minder, Are You Being Served?, The Two Ronnies)
9 August	Ken Hutchison	72	Actor (Murphy's Mob, The Sweeney)
10 August	Dilys Watling	78	Actress (Coronation Street, The Benny Hill Show, The Two Ronnies)
12 August	Una Stubbs	84	Actress (Summer Holiday, Till Death Us Do Part, Worzel Gummidge, The Worst Witch, EastEnders, Sherlock)
16 August	Sean Lock	58	Comedian (15 Storeys High, QI, 8 Out of 10 Cats, 8 Out of 10 Cats Does Countdown)
31 August	Theresa Plummer-Andrews	77	Television producer
5 September	Sarah Harding	39	Singer (Girls Aloud, Popstars: The Rivals), model and actress (Coronation Street, St Trinian's 2: The Legend of Fritton's Gold)
5 September	Tony Selby	83	Actor (Get Some In!, Doctor Who, Witchfinder General)
7 September	Edward Barnes	92	Television executive (BBC Head of Children's Television; creator of Newsround and Blue Peter)
8 September	Matthew Strachan	50	Theme tune composer (Who Wants to Be a Millionaire?)
15 September	Robert Fyfe	90	Actor (Last of the Summer Wine, No Strings, Coronation Street)
19 September	John Challis	79	Actor and comedian (Only Fools and Horses, The Green Green Grass, Benidorm)
19 September	Stephen Critchlow	54	Actor (The Infinite Worlds of H. G. Wells, Kenneth Williams: Fantabulosa!, Star Wars: The Old Republic)
19 September	Jimmy Greaves	81	Footballer and broadcaster (World of Sport, On the Ball, Saint and Greavsie)
19 September	Morris Perry	96	Actor (The Avengers, Z-Cars)
3 October	Marc Pilcher	53	Make-up artist (Bridgerton)
7 October	Rick Jones	84	Television presenter (Play School, Fingerbobs)
14 October	Sir Gerry Robinson	72	Television presenter (Can Gerry Robinson Fix the NHS?)
16 October	Denise Bryer	93	Actress (Terrahawks)
16 October	Geoffrey Chater	100	Actor (Mapp & Lucia, Callan)
16 October	Alan Hawkshaw	84	Musician and composer (Grange Hill, Countdown, Channel 4 News)
28 October	Christopher Wenner	66	Television presenter and film maker (Blue Peter, Cold Blood: The Massacre of East Timor)
3 November	Bob Baker	82	Screenwriter (Doctor Who, K-9)
4 November	Lionel Blair	92	Actor (The Limping Man, The Cool Mikado), choreographer and television presenter (Name That Tune)
6 November	Clifford Rose	92	Actor (Secret Army, Kessler)
November (Reported on 13 November)	Terry Smyth	73	News journalist and BBC NI head of sport
2 December	Antony Sher	72	Actor (The History Man, Murphy's Law)
December (Reported on 12 December)	Nev Wilshire		Reality television star (The Call Centre)
14 December	Jethro	73	Comedian
25 December	Janice Long	66	Presenter (Top of the Pops)
27 December	April Ashley	86	Transgender and LGBTQ+ rights activist, model, and author (Corbett v Corbett law case, Loose Women, The Extraordinary Life of April Ashley)
27 December	Graham Skidmore	90	British voice artist and announcer (Blind Date, Shooting Stars)

== See also ==
- 2021 in the United Kingdom
- 2021 in British music
- 2021 in British radio
- List of British films of 2021
