= The Mating Game =

The Mating Game may refer to:

- The Mating Game (album), an album and its title track by Bitter:Sweet
- The Mating Game (film), a 1959 film starring Debbie Reynolds and Tony Randall
- The Mating Game (TV series), a 2021 British nature documentary series
- "The Mating Game" (D:TNG episode), an episode of U.S. TV series Degrassi: The Next Generation
- "The Mating Game" (George and Mildred), a 1978 television episode
