= Fever Pitch (disambiguation) =

Fever Pitch, subtitled "A Fan's Life", is a 1992 book by Nick Hornby.

Fever Pitch may also refer to:

== Films and television ==
- Fever Pitch (1985 film), an American drama starring Ryan O'Neal
- Fever Pitch (1997 film), a British adaptation of Hornby's book, starring Colin Firth
- Fever Pitch (2005 film), an American adaptation of the 1997 film, starring Jimmy Fallon and Drew Barrymore
- Fever Pitch (TV series), a 2017 Australian television comedy panel show
- Fever Pitch: The Rise of the Premier League, a documentary series
- "Fever Pitch" (Below Deck Mediterranean), a television episode

== Other uses ==
- Fever Pitch (comics), a fictional villain in the Marvel Comics universe
- Fever Pitch (album), the official soundtrack to the 2002 FIFA World Cup
- Fever Pitch Soccer, a 1995 video game
