= Steinbichler =

Steinbichler is a surname. Notable people with the surname include:

- Hans Steinbichler (born 1966), German film director and screenwriter
- Stan Steinbichler (born 2002), Austrian actor
- Wolfgang Steinbichler (born 1989), Austrian para-cyclist
