= Fabrixx =

- Starring: Luka Dimić
- Country of origin: Germany

Fabrixx is a German television series. The show centers around the story of German youth in Stuttgart.

== See also ==
- List of German television series
