= Gerhard Liebmann =

Austrian actor

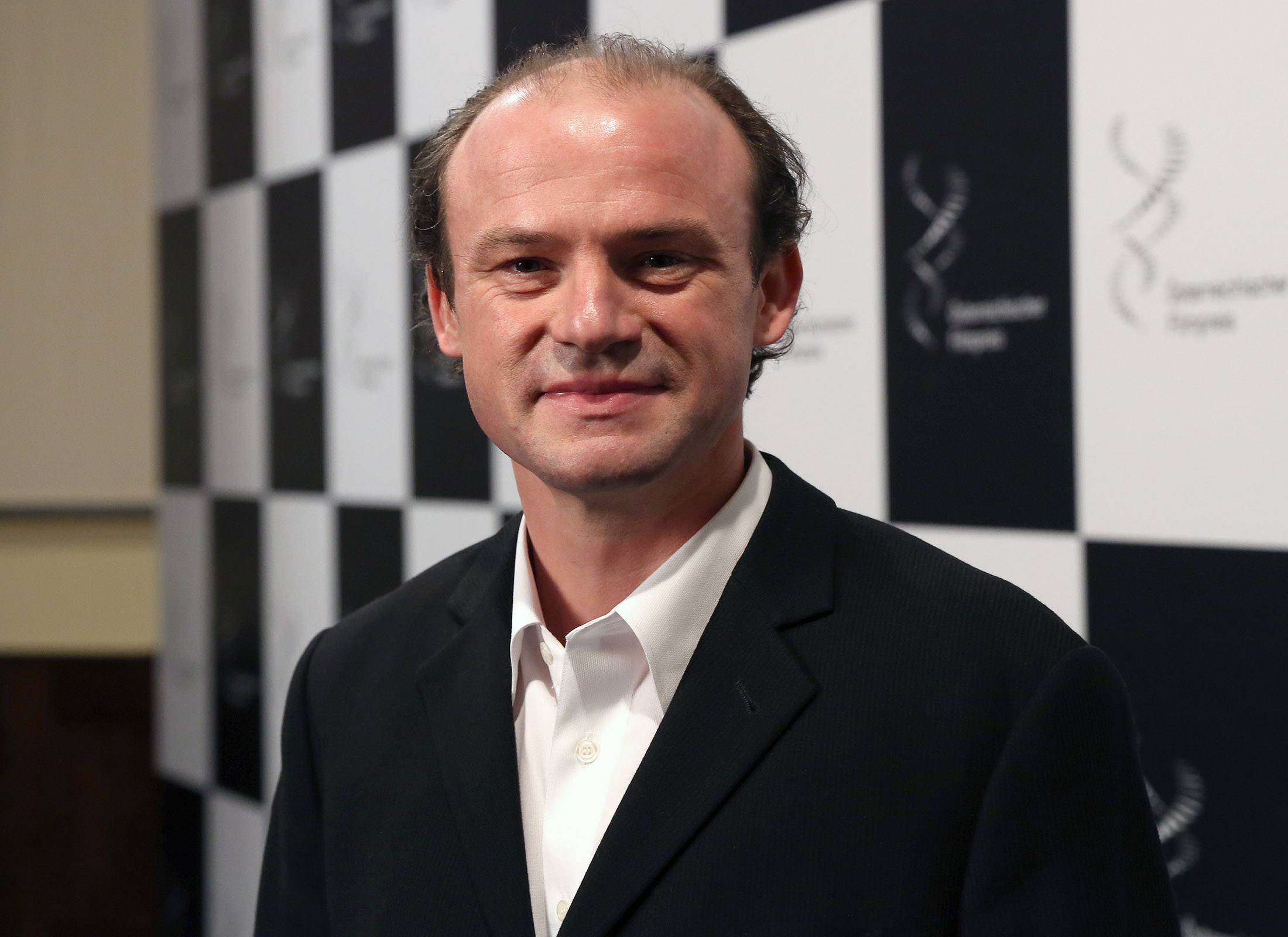
- Born: 20 April 1970 (age 56); Graz, Austria
- Occupation: Actor
- Years active: 1998-present

Gerhard Liebmann (born 20 April 1970) is an Austrian actor. He appeared in more than fifty films since 1998.

== Selected filmography ==
| Year | Title | Role | Notes |
|---|---|---|---|
| 2009 | The Bone Man | | |
| 2009 | Lourdes | | |
| 2010 | The Unintentional Kidnapping of Mrs. Elfriede Ott | | |
| 2011 | Breathing | | |
| 2011 | A Day for a Miracle | | |
| 2013 | Blood Glacier | Janek | |
| 2022 | Eismayer | Charles Eismayer | |
| 2025 | Welcome Home Baby | Scheichl | Premiere at the BIFF Panorama 2025 |
