= No Signal! =

- Genre: Sketch comedy Black comedy
- Voices of: Peter Dickson
- Music by: Julian Cox
- Country of origin: United Kingdom
- Original language: English
- No. of seasons: 1
- No. of episodes: 10

Production
- Running time: 22 min. (per episode)
- Production companies: You, Me 'n' Him Productions

Original release
- Network: FX
- Release: February 5 – April 9, 2009

No Signal! is a British sketch comedy show that aired on a weekly basis from 5 February to 9 April 2009 on FX. The show's humour was based almost entirely on satire of television, including channels, adverts and programming. Though general reaction was mixed, the show was considered successful.

== Overview ==
No Signal! is set up like a regular Sky TV system with similar graphics and numerous channels, which are flicked through until the show ends, meanwhile showing the various spoofs of commercials, documentaries, etc. An odd take on pre-show disclaimers air before each episode, which suggests that at least another series of No Signal! will be produced. The set up is considered strikingly similar to The Kevin Bishop Show, which began the previous year.

== Channels ==
=== 101 - The Main Channel ===
Parody of: BBC One
Channel 101 (the position of BBC One in reality), generally runs parodies of the said channel's shows, e.g. Antiques Roadshow and Have I Got News For You.

=== 167 - Bloke TV ===
Parody of: Men & Motors
Channel 167 regularly shows Cop Swap, featuring a pair of paranoid American police officers, one of whom has a very coarse mouth. In the last sketch they kill the show's cameraman, accusing him of perversion due to the constant filming of their daily patrols.

=== 191 - American Nonsense ===
Parody of: BET
Usually running America's Next Serial Killer (a parody of America's Next Top Model).

=== 220 - The Documentary Channel ===
Parody of: Sky Real Lives
Shows on this channel have bizarre and often unsettling plots, such as a man trying to live an active lifestyle, despite only being reduced to little more than his head.

=== 333 - The Deaf Channel ===
Parody of: The Deaf Channel
333 runs various formats of TV for people with hearing difficulties, e.g. Deaf Rap or Deaf Porn. The No Signal DVD also includes a deaf version of Gallows' In the Belly of a Shark as a deleted scene, which was meant to be included in episode 4 but was left out.

=== 372 - Lard Arse ===
Parody of: Food Network
Easy Chef is the only show on 372 shown to the audience. It features a traditional TV chef (possibly a parody of Jamie Oliver or Delia Smith), who cooks mostly kiddy favorites like Baked Beans on Toast or TV Dinners, though he presents it in a way that would try to suggest otherwise. He claims to be friends with Gary Rhodes and Gordon Ramsay.

=== 650 - Child Minder Channel ===
Parody of: CBeebies
Channel 650 is seen running a spoof of the hit young children's show Tweenies called The Chavvy Wavvys, about an asbo-riddled & dysfunctional family comprising Chavvy Daddy, Chavvy Mummy, Chavvy Son and Chavvy Daughter. Most of the episodes revolve around Chavvy Daddie's antics which include (among other things) robbing himself to claim on his home insurance.

=== 969 - Late Night Perv ===
Parody of: Babestation
Late Night Perv seems to be the home of Granny Porn XXX, which is a parody of models taking up stripping to grannies stripping. The grannies often say stuff like, "When I catch you with my featherduster, you'll be amazed where I can put it!". It also shows 'Topless Scrubbers On The Phone'.

== Adverts ==
In addition to the TV programmes, some of the flicks through the channel network show parodies of TV commercials such as dfs, Birds Eye and JML.

== International broadcast ==
- Australia - Airs weekly on The Comedy Channel
- New Zealand - Airs every Wednesday at 11pm on TVNZ U
