= Welcome Home Baby =

2025 Austrian-German horror film

- Promotional poster
- Directed by: Andreas Prochaska
- Screenplay by: Constantin Lieb; Daniela Baumgärtl; Andreas Prochaska
- Produced by: Tommy Pridnig; Ulf Israel
- Starring: Julia Franz Richter; Reinout Scholten van Aschat; Gerti Drassl; Maria Hofstätter; Gerhard Liebmann
- Cinematography: Carmen Treichl
- Edited by: Karin Hartusch
- Music by: Karwan Marouf
- Production companies: Lotus-Film GmbH [at]; Senator Film Produktion GmbH
- Distributed by: Wild Bunch Germany
- Release date: 13 February 2025 (Berlinale)
- Running time: 112 minutes
- Countries: Austria; Germany
- Language: German

Welcome Home Baby is a 2025 Austrian-German horror film directed and co-written by Andreas Prochaska. Starring Julia Franz Richter as Judith, an emergency doctor from Berlin, who inherits a villa in Austria. The film opens floodgates of her origins and questions everything she thought about her life. The film opened the Panorama 2025 at the 75th Berlin International Film Festival on 13 February 2025.

== Synopsis ==
Judith, an emergency doctor from Berlin, inherits a villa in Austria and finds herself in a sinister, women-dominated community. As she delves into the mystery of her ancestry, Judith unwittingly releases demonic forces that challenge her understanding of her life, family, and marriage.

== Cast ==
- Julia Franz Richter as Judith
- Reinout Scholten van Aschat as Ryan
- Gerti Drassl as Aunt Paula
- Maria Hofstätter as Mrs. Ramsauer
- Gerhard Liebmann as Scheichl

== Production ==
Principal photography began on 10 May 2024 on locations in Vienna, Lower Austria, Styria. Filming rotated on 28 June 2024 with filming locations in the regions of Austria - Lower Austria, Austria - Vienna.

== Release ==
Welcome Home Baby had its World premiere in the Panorama section of the 75th Berlin International Film Festival on 13 February 2025.

== Accolades ==
Award	Date	Category	Recipient	Result	Ref.
Berlin International Film Festival	23 February 2025	Panorama Audience Award for Best Feature Film	Andreas Prochaska	Nominated	
