= Luka Dimić =

German and Croatian actor (born 1986)

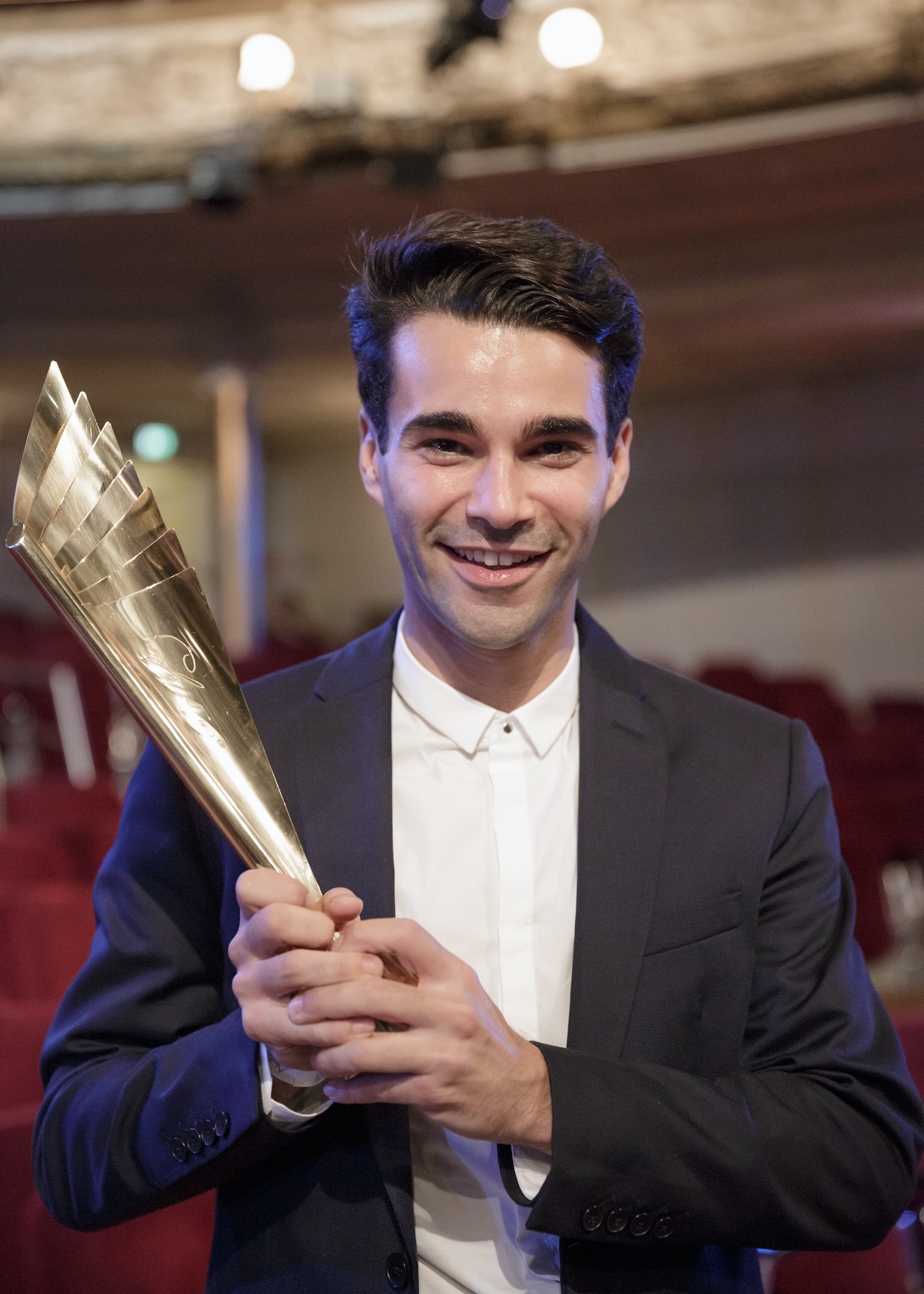
- Dimić in 2016
- Born: Luka Dimić; 1986 (age 39–40); Sarajevo, Bosnia and Herzegovina (then part of SFR Yugoslavia)
- Citizenship: Germany; Croatia
- Occupation: Actor
- Years active: 2009–present

Luka Dimić (born 1986) is a German and Croatian actor.

== Biography ==
Dimić was born in 1986 in Sarajevo, Bosnia and Herzegovina, the son of a Serbian father and a Croatian mother. He escaped to Germany as a refugee of the Bosnian War, along with his older brother, settling in a small Swabian town. Dimić began his acting career at the school's drama club, where his German teacher encouraged his wish to become an actor. Between October 2009 and September 2013, Dimić studied professional acting at the Konrad Wolf Film University of Babelsberg in Babelsberg.

While continuing his education, Dimić performed in various university productions and made several guest appearances at the Hans Otto Theatre in Potsdam, among other venues.

In 2013, Dimić was engaged at the state theatre of Rhineland-Palatinate, where he appeared as a guest at the Kleines Theater in Bad Godesberg and at the Schloßtheater in Neuwied, portraying the leading role of The Picture of Dorian Gray.

In August 2014, he performed in a theatre project by Falk Richter as part of the supporting show of the Venice Biennale. Between 2014 and 2015, Dimić appeared as a guest actor at the state theatre of Saxony in the musical Fame. In 2016, Dimić played a role in Wolfgang Herrndorf's Why We Took the Car at the Theater der Jugend in Vienna, Austria, for which he received the Nestroy Theatre Prize for Best Young Actor. He became a permanent member of the acting ensemble at the Bern Theatre in 2017 and remained there until 2021. In 2022 and 2023, he was a guest actor at the Theater am Neumarkt in Zurich, Switzerland.

He has also appeared in various television productions, including the children's series Fabrixx and in an ARD film, starring along Alicia von Rittberg. Dimić worked in the twelfth season of the ZDF crime series SOKO Wismar, where he had a supporting role. In 2018, he appeared in the ARD series St. Josef am Berg, alongside Paula Kalenberg and Harald Krassnitzer.

Dimić obtained his breakthrough role at the 2022 film Eismayer, where he played the lead role of Austrian Army recruit Mario Falak, who falls in love with his male drill instructor. Other works include 2022 TV film based on the series Tatort, and a participation in 2023 with the cast of the soap opera In aller Freundschaft.

In an interview published in the Süddeutsche Zeitung in February 2021, Dimić came out as gay along with 185 lesbian, gay, bisexual, queer, non-binary, and trans actors. Together with Eva Meckbach and Karin Hanczewski, he initiated a campaign to gain greater acceptance for LGBTQ+ people in society and to demand more recognition in the film, television and stage industries.
