= Eismayer =

2022 Austrian drama film

- Directed by: David Wagner
- Screenplay by: David Wagner
- Produced by: Arash T. Riahi; Sabine Gruber
- Starring: Gerhard Liebmann; Luka Dimić; Julia Koschitz
- Cinematography: Serafin Spitzer
- Edited by: Stephan Bechinger
- Music by: Eva Klampfer
- Release date: 2022
- Country: Austria

Eismayer is a 2022 Austrian drama film written and directed by David Wagner, in his feature film debut.

It won the Venice Critics’ Week Grand Prize at the 79th edition of the Venice Film Festival.

== Plot ==
Sergeant Major Charles Eismayer, a feared and brutal drill sergeant in the Austrian Army, is known for his tough and uncompromising training methods, making him a formidable figure among new recruits.

However, Eismayer harbors a secret: he is a closeted gay man. His carefully constructed heteronormative facade begins to crumble when he meets Mario Falak, an openly gay recruit. Despite the rigid and macho environment of the military, a passionate and secret romance blossoms between them.

== Cast ==
- Gerhard Liebmann as Charles Eismayer
- Luka Dimić as Mario Falak
- Julia Koschitz as Christina Eismayer
- Anton Noori as Striegl
- Karl Fischer as Hierzberger
- Christopher Schärf as Karnaval
- Lion Tatzber as Dominik Eismayer
- Thomas Momcinovic as Tomić
- Thomas Otrok as Nagl
- Stan Steinbichler as Weber
- Matthias Hack as Gratzl
- Lukas Johne as Jan
- Harry Lampl as Mader

== Production ==
The film is based on real events. It was produced by Golden Girls Film, in co-operation with ORF Film/Fernseh-Abkommen and ZDF, and in association with Arte.

== Release ==
The film premiered at the 79th Venice International Film Festival, in the International Critics' Week sidebar, where it won the Grand Prize for best film.

== Reception ==
On the review aggregator website Rotten Tomatoes, 90% of 10 critics' reviews are positive, with an average rating of 7.0/10. The film won four Austrian Film Awards, for best screenplay, best score, best actor (Gerhard Liebmann) and best supporting actor (Luka Dimic).
