= Sonja McLaughlan =

British sports broadcaster

Sonja McLaughlan (born 9 September 1962) is a British sports broadcaster. She joined the corporation in 1988, and has since covered seven Summer Olympics (from Atlanta 1996 to Tokyo 2020). McLaughlan is the producer for the BBC’s rugby union coverage, and broadcasts coverage of the Six Nations Championship.

== Career ==
McLaughlan joined the BBC in 1988 as a trainee, becoming a news producer on BBC Radio Sussex. She moved to London in 1993, and became a producer in BBC Radio's sports department. In 1995, she became the producer for the BBC's rugby union coverage. McLaughlan contributes to the BBC's coverage of the Six Nations Championship, conducting touchline interviews. McLaughlan also covers athletics for BBC Radio 5 Live and gives reports for the BBC News channel.

McLaughlan has reported from every one of the Olympic Games since Atlanta 1996. She was also part of the British Channel 4 commentary team for the London 2012 Paralympics. McLaughlan has additionally provided coverage for the World Athletics Championships, the London Marathon and The Boat Race.
