= Sky Nature =

British television channel launched in 2020 by Sky

- Logo used since 2026

- Alternate Logo for UI/EPG, digital and small format spaces.

Programming
- Picture format: 1080i HDTV (downscaled to 16:9 576i for the SDTV feed.)

Ownership
- Owner: Sky Group (Comcast)
- Sister channels: List of Sky UK channels

History
- Launched: 27 May 2020; 6 years ago
- Replaced: Fox

Availability

Streaming media
- Sky Go: Watch live (UK and Ireland only)
- Now: Watch live (UK and Ireland only)
- Virgin TV Go: Watch live (UK only)
- Virgin TV Anywhere: Watch live (Ireland only)

Sky Nature is a British pay television channel owned and operated by Sky, a division of Comcast, which launched on 27 May 2020. Sky Nature broadcasts original Sky content, content from Canadian channel Love Nature, and Sky's collection of David Attenborough programming.

== History ==
The launch of the channel was used to help bring High dynamic range (HDR) content to Sky Q.

When Love Nature was removed from Virgin Media in December 2020, most of its former content moved to Sky Nature.

Sky Nature launched an Irish feed on 8 April 2021. The channel is registered with the broadcasting regulator in Luxembourg however, the Luxembourg regulator will make use of the classification system set by Ireland's BAI Code of Program Standards. The channel is currently only available in standard definition.

The channel originally broadcast on Sky channel 130, but when Fox closed on 1 July 2021, Sky Nature moved into its place on channel 124 shortly afterwards.

== Programming ==
Sky Nature currently broadcast a variety of nature series, both on the live TV feed and on demand:

- Extreme Animals: One Wild Day
- Extreme Animals: Life’s First Steps
- Amazing Animal Friends
- Wild Tales from the Farm
- Shark with Steve Backshall
- Monkey Life
- Gangs of Lemur Island
- Wild Israel

== Branding ==
The logo consists of the Sky logo coloured green followed by the word "nature" on a green background. The logo originally consisted of a bunch of leaves forming the background where the "nature" text is. It was later changed to green.

== International version ==
On 1 July 2021 Sky Nature was launched in Italy, alongside Sky Documentaries, Sky Investigation (the local version of Sky Witness) and Sky Serie.

== See also ==
- List of television stations in the United Kingdom
