= Stan Steinbichler =

Austrian actor

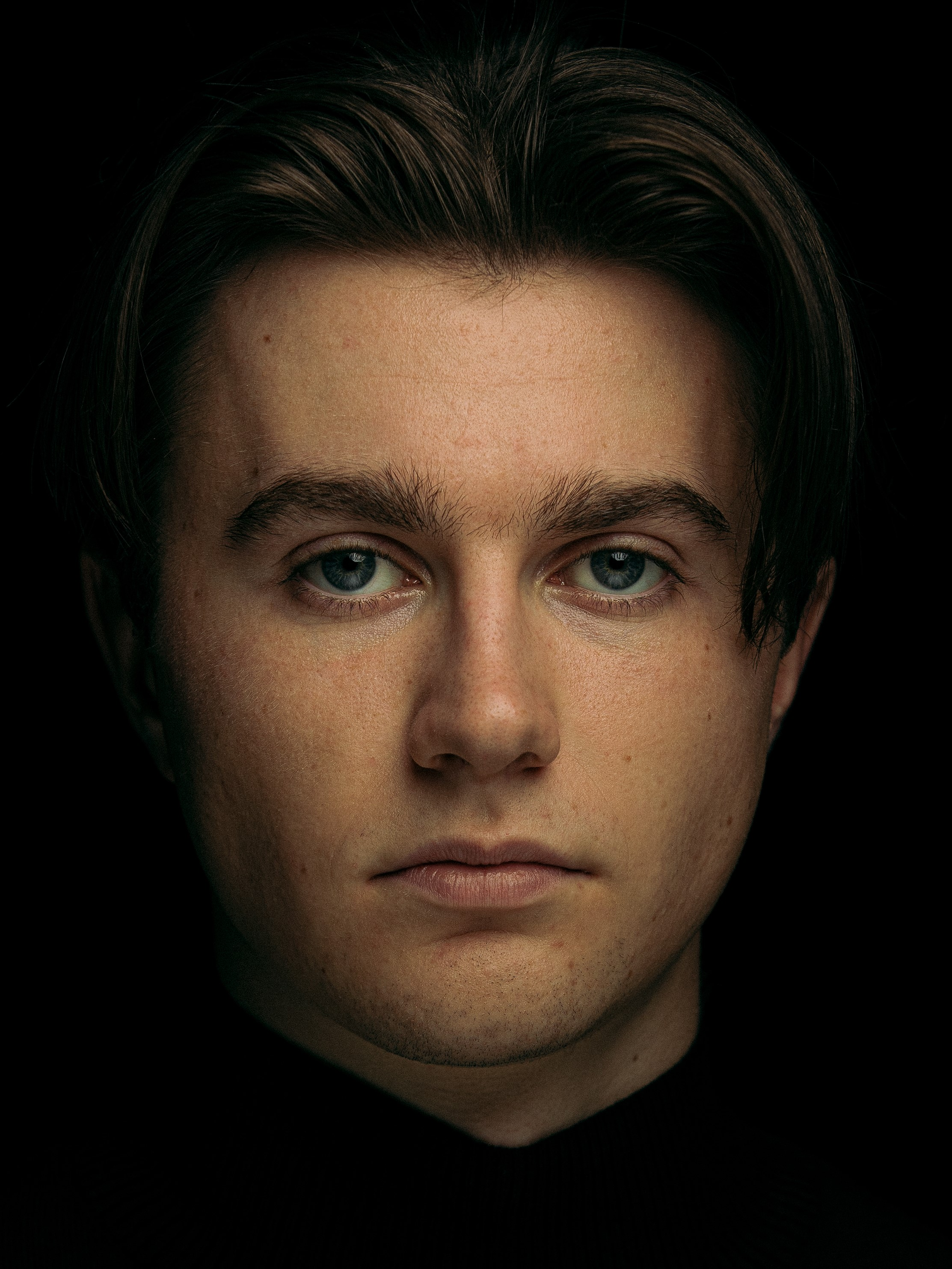
Stanislaus Steinbichler

Stanislaus "Stan" Steinbichler (born 9 January 2002 in Salzburg) is an actor from Austria.

== Life ==
Steinbichler played various roles in Austrian children's TV series and movies and appeared in several plays. In 2019, he played Stefan Wolf in one episode of the TV series Vienna Blood, before being cast in 2020 for the role of Nico Haas in the Netflix series "Zero Chill", directed by Angelo Abela and Tessa Hoffe. 2021 he appeared as Mitteregger in the movie "Der Fuchs" under direction by Adrian Goiginger.

In 2023, Stan took on the role of Isaac Wentworth as the lead actor in the psychological thriller "Dirty Boy" alongside Graham McTavish and Susie Porter.

He graduated from Danube International School Vienna in 2020.

== Filmography ==
- 2016: Erich Kästner und der Kleine Dienstag
- 2017: Siebzehn
- 2017: Trakehnerblut – Das Vermächtnis 2
- 2018: SOKO Donau – Herz aus Stein
- 2019: Vienna Blood
- 2019: Blind ermittelt – Das Haus der Lügen
- 2019: Der Bergdoktor
- 2020: Familiensache ORF
- 2020: Soko Kitzbühel - Home Invasion
- 2021: Landkrimi - Das Flammenmädchen
- 2021: SOKO Donau - Alter Ego
- 2019–2021: Zero Chill - Netflix Series
- 2021: Die Toten von Salzburg
- 2021: Der Fuchs
- 2022: Eismayer
- 2023: SOKO DONAU - Das Grab
- 2023: Dirty Boy
- 2024: Vier minus drei
- 2025: Altausse Krimi - Der letzte Stollen
- 2025: Die Fälle der Gerti B.
- 2025: Adams Acht
- 2025: Body Farm
