= Zero Chill =

British television series

- Genre: Teen drama
- Created by: Kirstie Falkous; John Regier
- Written by: Adam Usden
- Directed by: Angelo Abela
- Starring: Grace Beedie; Dakota Taylor; Jade Ma; Jeremias Amoore; Anastasia Chocholatá; Leonardo Fontes; Sarah-Jane Potts; Doug Rao; Tanja Ribič; Oscar Skagerberg; Stan Steinbichler; Christina Tam
- Opening theme: "The Mother We Share" by Chvrches
- Composer: Vince Pope
- Country of origin: United Kingdom
- Original language: English
- No. of series: 1
- No. of episodes: 10

Production
- Executive producers: Angelo Abela; Tim Compton; Kate Little; Claire Poyser
- Producer: Dominic MacDonald
- Production locations: Sheffield, England
- Cinematography: Phil Wood
- Editor: Dave Long
- Running time: 26–34 minutes
- Production company: Lime Pictures

Original release
- Network: Netflix
- Release: 15 March 2021

Zero Chill is a British teen drama television series, created by Kirstie Falkous and John Regier for Netflix, and produced by Lime Pictures, with Adam Usden serving as lead writer. The show was filmed in Sheffield, England. Grace Beedie and Dakota Benjamin Taylor star in the series alongside an ensemble cast, portraying the MacBentley twins, who are a figure skater and ice hockey player respectively. The series premiered on 15 March 2021. On 17 November 2021, Netflix cancelled Zero Chill after one season. But now it is back on Netflix.

== Premise ==
The MacBentley family moves to England from Canada, when Mac is offered a place on a prestigious ice hockey team. His twin sister, Kayla, struggles to adapt to the change, having been separated from her figure skating partner.

== Cast and characters ==
=== Main ===
- Grace Beedie as Kayla MacBentley, a figure skater who is forced to move to England when her twin brother, Mac, is offered a place on the Hammers
- Dakota Taylor as "Mac" MacBentley, a talented but arrogant hockey player for the Hammers
- Jade Ma as Sky Tyler, an ice skater who stopped due to having leukaemia. She is Kayla's best friend and Mac's love interest.
- Jeremias Amoore as Bear Stelzer, captain of the Hammers and Sam's older brother
- Anastasia Chocholatá as Ava Hammarström, a figure skater who wants to tryout for her father's hockey team
- Leonardo Fontes as Sam Stelzer, goalie for the Hammers and Bear's naive younger brother
- Sarah-Jane Potts as Jenny MacBentley, the mother of Kayla and Mac
- Doug Rao as Luke MacBentley, the father of Kayla and Mac, and assistant coach for the Hammers
- Tanja Ribič as Elina Hammarström, the harsh and overbearing mother of Ava, and Anton's ex-wife
- Oscar Skagerberg as Anton Hammarström, Ava's father, coach of the Hammers and Elina's ex-husband
- Stan Steinbichler as Nico Haas, one of Mac's teammates who takes a dislike to him
- Christina Tam as Holly Tyler, the overprotective mother of Sky who is reluctant to let her daughter skate again due to Sky's health

=== Recurring ===
- Toby Murray as Archie Long, a figure skater who cannot find a partner
- Kenneth Tynan as Jacob Schimmer, Kayla's former skating partner from Toronto
- Ayumi Roux as Maia Legarde, Jacob's new partner
- Brett Houghton as Carson Hubick, a player from the Orcas and Mac's rival
- Jerry Kwarteng as Axel Stelzer, the father of Bear and Sam
- Calin Bleau as Marek Zelezney, coach of the Wolverines

== Production ==
Producers of Zero Chill wanted to cast real skaters for the series, since it brought "authenticity" that "CGI trickery" could not. Regardless of their skating experience, the cast members were sent to a nine-week training programme prior to filming. Executive producer Angelo Abela stated that the cast members got to try out both sports, so ice skaters could play ice hockey and vice versa. Dakota Benjamin Taylor explained that for the ice skating scenes, cast members were not permitted to do jumps on the ice. After producers met with Team GB figure skating coach David Hartley, the general manager of the IceSheffield, where Hartley works, offered them the opportunity to film the series there. When the cast members went in for training, they were able to watch professional figure skaters training, as well as the Sheffield Steelers.

Abela stated that they used filming techniques that were used on Free Rein, another series produced by Lime Pictures. He explained: "We decided to shoot in two different ways: with the figure skaters we went for very elegant, long tracking shots on the ice. We put cameramen in rickshaws and had them pushed on the ice alongside the skaters. Then, with the hockey scenes, it became much more handheld camera work, filmed behind Perspex screens on the ice." On the choice to film the series in Sheffield, Abala explained that the city is known as a "major ice-skating hub". Other filming locations include Park Hill, Broomhall, Sheaf Valley Park, the Cholera Monument Grounds and Norfolk Heritage Park. Hartley and two members of the Sheffield Steelers were also hired as coaches for the cast members. In November 2021, it was announced by Deadline Hollywood that Netflix had cancelled Zero Chill after one series.

== Episodes ==
| No. | Title | Directed by | Written by | Original release date |
|---|---|---|---|---|
| 1 | "Come and Take it from Me" | Angelo Abela | Adam Usden | 15 March 2021 |
Figure skater Kayla breaks into the local ice rink to practice with partner, Jacob (who is in Toronto), via video call. Mac blames Kayla when his online interview with a hockey journalist goes awry. Kayla befriends Sky, waitress at the rink, who Mac takes a shine to, but Sky quickly points out his arrogance. When Kayla again goes to the rink after hours, Jacob doesn’t answer the call. She then witnesses an unknown person dressed in a Hammers uniform do a dance routine. Jenny and Luke arrange for Kayla to meet a potential new dance partner, but Archie proves to be a miss when he drops Kayla at the end of their routine. After falling out with Mac over their move to England, Kayla embarrasses her twin brother in front of his new coach, Anton Hammarström, and receives a warning from the latter in the process. Mac later catches Kayla sneaking out and follows her to the rink, where he anonymously tips off Anton. Kayla sees the mystery skater again, but is caught by Anton.
| 2 | "Secret Skater" | Angelo Abela | Vicki Lutas and Anna McCleery | 15 March 2021 |
Mac wakes up to a room full of balloons courtesy of a prank from his Hammers teammates, welcoming him to the team. Kayla tries to find out who the mystery skater is, but is lumbered with doing the cleaning as punishment for breaking into the rink. Sky confides in Mac about her leukaemia diagnosis. When the team is sluggish with its skating, Anton brings in Kayla to help, to the bemusement of Mac. Kayla thinks Ava is number 67, but she refutes the claim, saying she just enjoys hockey. Kayla finds out Sky is the mystery skater and confronts her, inadvertently telling Sky’s mother that she had been skating. Ava tells her parents that she wants to play hockey, but they don’t take her seriously. Kayla finds out Jacob is in England.
| 3 | "Sucker Punch" | Angelo Abela | Tom Melia | 15 March 2021 |
Kayla sees that Jacob is in England and assumes he is there to surprise her. She finds him at another rink, partnered with French skater Maia. She is hurt by his betrayal, but Maia reveals that their parents organised their pairing months in advance, since Jacob’s parents see Kayla as unmotivated. Ava’s mother Elina organises for her to practice jumping in a harness and becomes annoyed with her when Ava wants to attend Anton’s hockey match.
| 4 | "Ice Breaker" | Angelo Abela | Zoë Lister | 15 March 2021 |
Determined to prove that she and Jacob are the perfect skating pair, Kayla organises for them to perform a routine at Anton’s upcoming match to showcase their skills. Bear approaches Sky, who is confused by the interaction. It is explained that they dated prior to her leukemia diagnosis and he left her due to being scared to lose her. The pair agree to be friends. Ava expresses an interest in being involved with hockey, so Mac suggests that she dresses up as the team mascot. Her disguise later comes off and she is exposed to her parents. When she sees Anton hugging Mac, Ava becomes jealous, and in retaliation, she gives the opposing team a notebook full of Anton’s tactics for the game.
| 5 | "We Do Our Talking on the Ice" | Angelo Abela | Adam Usden | 15 March 2021 |
Ava informs Elina that she does not want to skate anymore and moves in with Anton. Mac discovers that the opposing team has the notebook detailing their game tactics and worries for the fate of the match. Mac discovers Kayla and Jacob’s plan to do a showcase on the ice and tells him to leave. Sky sees Jacob leaving and heads to the rink to perform with Kayla, so that she is not humiliated. Sky’s mother sees her skating, but watches on with pride. However, Sky falls at the end of the routine.
| 6 | "Head Rush" | Tessa Hoffe | Vicki Lutas and Anna McCleery | 15 March 2021 |
Kayla goes to visit Sky in hospital, but her mother does not allow Kayla to see her. She sneaks in past visiting hours dressed as a cleaner, but is called in to clean a children’s ward which is covered in slime. Kayla sees Sky’s mother crying and comforts her. She tells Kayla that despite her worries, Sky can skate. Anton allows Ava to play on the hockey team. Sam is happy when father Axel arrives, while Bear is reluctant to talk to him. Mac is taken to hospital when a puck ricochets off the crossbar and hits him on the head. He is placed in the same ward as Sky, who asks him why Kayla has not visited her. Mac informs her that Kayla did come to the hospital and Sky realises her mother has lied. Mac confides in Sky that he does not enjoy hockey anymore and thinks he should quit.
| 7 | "Triple Threat" | Tessa Hoffe | Zoë Lister and Adam Usden | 15 March 2021 |
Elina offers to be Kayla’s coach, but she affirms that she wants to skate with Sky. After Kayla is let down by her mother, Elina takes her shopping for new ice skates. Anton gives Ava his first ever hockey stick to inspire her. Axel receives numerous phone calls, but does not answer them. Mac tells his parents that he does not want to play hockey anymore. Sky offers to help Mac practice and cancels her skating plans with Kayla by telling her she is feeling unwell. Elina sees them on the ice and tells Kayla to come to the rink. Kayla and Bear see them kissing. Bear tells the team that Mac is responsible for giving the opposing team the notebook of tactics, while Ava overhears. Feeling Sky used her to get close to Mac, she agrees to do solo skating for Elina.
| 8 | "Guilt Trip" | Tessa Hoffe | Tom Melia | 15 March 2021 |
Kayla begins skating for Elina, who is strict with her routine. Kayla confides in Sky that her friends would always use her to get close to Mac, but adds that Sky is the only friend that Mac has liked back. The MacBentley family hosts a barbecue in order for Mac to bond with his teammates. They torment Mac and when Ava sees their treatment of him, she admits responsibility for giving the other team the notebook. Mac forgives her, but Anton sends her back to Elina. Axel informs Bear and Sam that he is planning to buy a house for the three of them. Bear questions how we can afford it and Axel explains that he has placed a bet that the Wolverines will win the upcoming match against the Hammers, telling Bear to make them lose.
| 9 | "This Is Happening" | Tessa Hoffe | Adam Usden | 15 March 2021 |
Marek, coach of the Wolverines, offers Mac a place on his team. But since they are based in the Czech Republic, it would mean having to move to Prague. To allow Kayla to continue skating, they agree that Jenny will stay in England with her and Luke will move to Prague with Mac. Marek later tells him that he will only have a place on his team if he performs well in the match. Axel shows Bear and Sam the house he plans to buy and tells Bear that he should put their family above his team. Anton pulls Ava from the game to ensure they have the best chance of winning. Elina comforts her and asks to train her alongside Kayla, but Ava affirms that she is a Hammer now. Elina takes Kayla to the Blade Star competition, but tells her she cannot bring friends or family as they will distract her.
| 10 | "Blade Star" | Tessa Hoffe | Adam Usden | 15 March 2021 |
At the skating competition, Kayla calls Sky to vent. She sees Maia, who informs Kayla that she has dumped Jacob and is skating in the solo category, against Kayla. Sky senses that Kayla needs her and arrives at the competition to support her. Kayla performs her routine and despite placing in second, Elina is disappointed due to Kayla misplacing her arm in the routine. She tells Elina that she wants to skate with Sky, and Elina insists that she will be ending her career since competitions do not allow same sex pairings. Kayla goes to skate, but Sky surprises her and they skate together and she is disqualified from the competition. Ava tells Elina that she wants her mother back, but not as a coach and the pair reconcile. Elina then gives Maia a business card. The Hammers win the match. Sam sees Axel leave and chases after him. Axel says that he is leaving and Sam initially blames Bear for his departure. Axel admits that he asked Bear to throw the game for his bet. Mac declines the offer from Marek, meaning the MacBentleys can all stay in England.
