= Sarah Rainsford =

British journalist

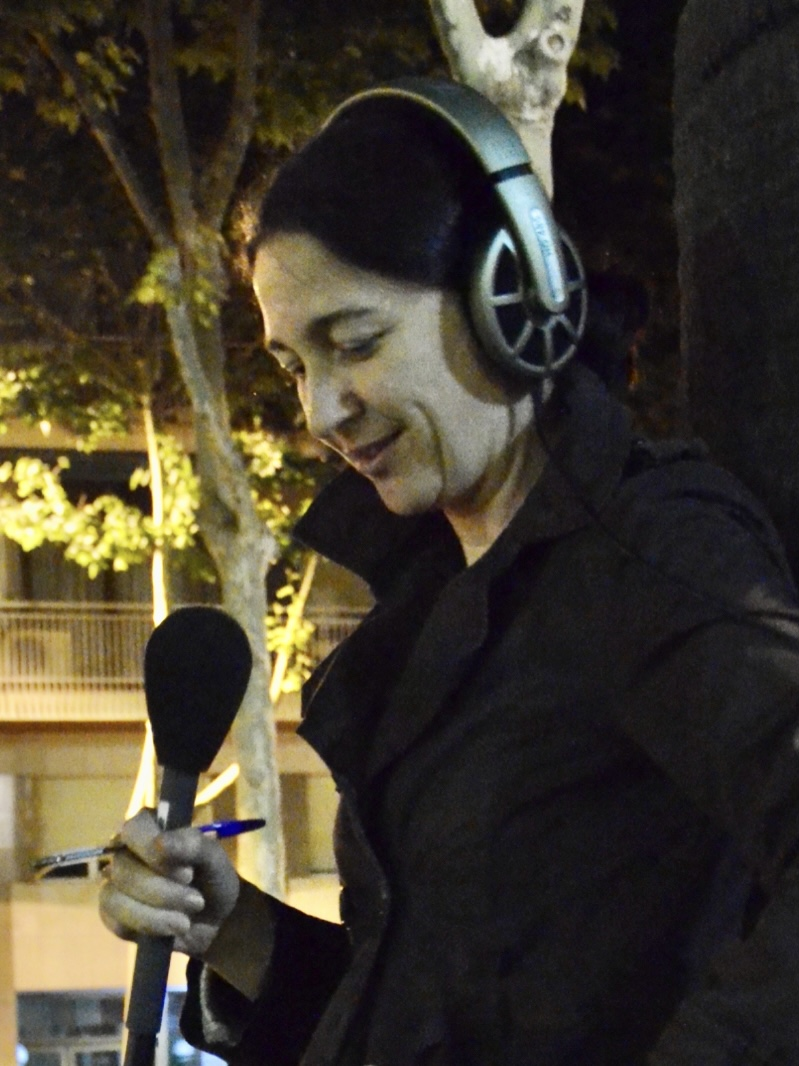
- Sarah Rainsford reporting from Barcelona in 2011
- Education: Fitzwilliam College, Cambridge
- Occupation: Journalist
- Known for: BBC's Russia correspondent

Sarah Elizabeth Rainsford is a British journalist. She is a BBC foreign correspondent who has reported from Russia, Ukraine, Spain, Turkey, Cuba, Afghanistan and Iraq while working for the BBC since 1999.

== Early life and education ==
Rainsford attended secondary school in the Midlands and then graduated with a degree in languages, specialising in Russian and French, from Fitzwilliam College, Cambridge. As part of her studies, she spent a year abroad in Saint Petersburg.

== Expulsion from Russia ==
External videos
- Lukashenko: 'You can choke on your sanctions in the UK', BBC

Rainsford was informed by the Russian government in mid-August 2021 that her visa would not be renewed, in effect expelling her as part of retaliatory actions between the United Kingdom and Russia over news coverage.

Tim Davie, the Director-General of the BBC, stated that "the expulsion of Sarah Rainsford is a direct assault on media freedom which we condemn unreservedly. Sarah is an exceptional and fearless journalist. She is a fluent Russian speaker who provides independent and in-depth reporting of Russia and the former Soviet Union.... We urge the Russian authorities to reconsider their decision. In the meantime, we will continue to report events in the region independently and impartially."

In 2024, Rainsford published an account of her journalistic work in Russia, Goodbye to Russia: A Personal Reckoning from the Ruins of War.
