= Fox (British and Irish TV channel) =

British pay television channel, 2004–2021

- Final logo as Fox (2019−2021)
- Country: United Kingdom; Ireland

Programming
- Picture format: 1080i HDTV (downscaled to 16:9 576i for the SDTV feed)
- Timeshift service: Fox +1

Ownership
- Owner: Fox Networks Group (Disney International Operations/Disney UK & Ireland)
- Sister channels: BabyTV; National Geographic; Nat Geo Wild

History
- Launched: 12 January 2004
- Closed: 1 July 2021 (17 years, 5 months and 19 days)
- Replaced by: Sky Nature
- Former names: FX289 (2004–2005); FX (2005–2013)

Fox (stylised as FOX) was a British pay television channel serving the United Kingdom and Ireland, owned by Fox Networks Group, a unit of Disney International Operations. It launched on 12 January 2004 as FX289, then changed its name to FX in April 2005 (similar to the American FX), and rebranded to FOX in January 2013. Featuring a mix of comedies and drama series, the channel's programming targeted adults from 18 to 35 years old.

It was announced on 17 May 2021 that Fox would cease broadcasting in the UK and Ireland on 1 July 2021. Most of its content was moved to Star on Disney+. The channel ceased broadcasting as planned on that day.

== History ==
=== FX289 (2004–05) ===
The channel launched on 12 January 2004 branded as FX289, in reference to its Sky EPG number. In its early years, it mainly broadcast films from the 20th Century Fox library.

=== FX (2005–2013) ===
FX logo (2011–2013)

FX HD logo (2011-2013)

The channel was rebranded as FX as it moved in the Sky EPG on 21 April 2005. As FX, the channel targeted a demographic of mainly males. Unlike its American counterpart, it promoted and aired both Fox-produced and non-Fox-produced shows. It had a similar format to its American sister channel, with a schedule consisting largely of Fox-produced shows, including comedies such as Arrested Development, Family Guy, American Dad! and King of the Hill, and dramas such as Millennium, The Shield, The X-Files, and NYPD Blue. Non-Fox-produced shows rerun or receiving their UK premiere on the channel include The Walking Dead, Falling Skies, Babylon 5, Carnivàle, Highlander, JAG, NCIS, Sleeper Cell, E-Ring and Huff, Nip/Tuck, Generation Kill, True Blood, Mob City and Dexter. The channel also produced original content such as the sketch show No Signal!

On 12 September 2005, a two-hour timeshift service - FX +, was launched on Sky Digital. This was followed up with the launch of FX +1 two years later on 10 December 2007. However, the launch of that network led to some confusion as FX + had not been changed to reflect this, leading to two networks having similar names (FX +, FX +1) and viewers assuming a mistake or a double-over of the channel. FX +1 was deemed to be a "filler" network, being launched by Fox to hold up the space for another network.

On 8 April 2008, it was announced that FX HD would launch on 21 April, replacing FX +1. The channel ran from 7:00pm–2:00am, and broadcast as a commercial-free service broadcasting entirely separate schedule from the SD feed, only broadcasting programmes originally made in high-definition. The channel's launch was delayed by a week to the 28th, due to "technical problems at the transmission end", and launched at 10:00pm on that day. On 1 September 2008, FX + became a one-hour timeshift service.

On 24 April 2009, FX HD became a simulcast of FX, broadcasting HD content when possible but only broadcasting between 7:00pm and 2:00am every day. The channel also joined Virgin Media's digital cable TV lineup on channel 158 on 30 July 2009.

On 5 January 2010, FX HD increased its broadcast hours to match its SD counterpart.

=== Fox (2013–2021) ===
In November 2012, it was announced that FX would be renamed as Fox at the start of 2013. The channels, FX, FX + and FX HD were rebranded as Fox, Fox + and Fox HD on at 9:00 p.m. GMT on 11 January 2013 with the beginning of the tenth season of NCIS. With this change, the target demographic switched to both men and women aged between 18 and 35 years old. New programmes added to the schedule included Louie, The Ricki Lake Show, Men at Work, Da Vinci's Demons and the second season of The Increasingly Poor Decisions of Todd Margaret, while many of the programmes that featured on FX continued to broadcast such as The Walking Dead, Dexter, True Blood, Falling Skies, Family Guy, and NCIS. Fox also planned to commission up to 50 hours of original UK content by the end of the year, expecting to spend between £5m and £10m.

Fox was removed from the BT YouView platform on 1 March 2016. BT stated in an e-mail to customers that Fox had "changed the way they offer their TV channels to TV providers." Following Disney's acquisition of 21st Century Fox, including Fox Networks Group International, the channel falls under ultimate ownership of Walt Disney Direct-to-Consumer and International.

On 18 March 2017, Fox + was renamed Fox +1.

In February 2019, the channel rebranded for the first time in more than four years. The rebrand included a new on-air identity which is more modern compared to earlier logos and idents.

=== Closure ===
On 17 May 2021, Disney announced that Fox would be closing at the end of June, with all of the channel's content moving to Star hub of Disney+. "On 30 June, the Fox channel in the UK will close," announced a spokesperson for the broadcaster. "Many titles will become available on Star on Disney+ and will be announced in the near future. We appreciate the support of our UK fans and can't wait to keep sharing the best stories with you. Star on Disney+ serves as the home of movies and television from Disney's creative studios, including Disney Television Studios (20th Television and ABC Signature), FX Productions and 20th Century Studios."

The channel closed on 1 July 2021, with its website redirecting to Disney+. The final programme that was scheduled to be shown on Fox was The Republic of Doyle, season 5, episode 12: "Sleight of Hand" at 4:00 to 5:00am on Fox HD/SD and from 5:00 to 6:00am on Fox +1. One hour of teleshopping was broadcast on each channel before a screen card stating the channel had closed was shown, though the teleshopping was not on the EPG listings on Fox +1.

On Sky, Fox was on channel 124. On 1 July 2021, after Fox's closure, Sky Nature was moved from channel 130 to channel 124. Its secondary channel was not moved, which remained on channel 893.

== Programming ==
In addition to British and American programming, the channel has aired a number of international programmes. These include Last Man Standing and The Nominees from Australia; Jo from France; Charlie Jade, a co-production between Canada and South Africa; and the Flemish series Matrioshki, which was shown with subtitles.

Original content has also aired on the channel, including No Signal! which aired from February to April 2009.

For several weeks from 5 December 2005, FX carried a strand of programming from the Fox-owned American channel Fuel TV. The strand was identified as FX Presents Fuel TV, and made use of Fuel TV's US branding graphics. The strand ran for an hour from 10:00 a.m., and was repeated in the early hours of the following morning. In August 2015, Fox announced that a variety of Adult Swim programming would air on the channel including adult animated sci-fi comedy Rick and Morty, starting Thursday, 10 September of that year. On 10 September 2015, Adult Swim moved to Fox along with truTV, airing Rick and Morty and Mr. Pickles as its first day line up. As of 2016, it aired on Fridays from Midnight to 1:00 a.m.

=== Funny as Fox ===
Similar to Fox's Animation Domination in America. Funny as Fox was a programming block which aired shows similarly to its American counterpart, such as Family Guy and American Dad! (both now shown on ITV2). The block name was the same as Fox's slogan. Funny As Fox used to air People of Earth until late 2019.

Funny As Fox aired, on some days, from 9pm to 4am. This was regularly not the case as some premieres shown on Fox were shown around 9pm to 11pm so the block normally aired from 11pm to 4am. The main slogan for the block was "Late Night, Every Night... Literally!".

=== Final programming ===
- American Dad! (also on ITV2) (April 2005 – June 2021)
- Bones (now on Disney+ and Channel 4)
- Bull (now on 5USA)
- Family Guy (also on ITV2) (January 2005 – June 2021)
- The Mentalist
- NCIS (now on Disney+ and 5USA)
- NCIS: New Orleans (now on U&W)
- Republic of Doyle

=== Former programming ===
- 11.22.63
- 24: Legacy
- American Horror Story
- APB
- Aqua Teen Hunger Force
- Atlanta (also on BBC Two)
- Autopsy
- Baskets
- Batman
- Bless This Mess
- Body of Proof (now on Disney+ and U&Alibi)
- Boomtown
- Braquo
- Brockmire
- Buffy the Vampire Slayer (now on Disney+ and Paramount+)
- Burn Notice (now on Disney+ and Sky Witness)
- Carnivàle (now on HBO Max)
- The Cleveland Show (now airs on Comedy Central and ITV2)
- The Closer
- Constantine
- Cops
- Damien
- Da Vinci's Demons (now on Disney+)
- Deep State (now on Disney+)
- Dexter (now on Paramount+, Channel 4 and Channel 5)
- Dream Corp LLC
- Drive Shaft
- Emergence (now on Disney+)
- Falling Skies (now on Netflix)
- False Flag
- The Family (now on STV Player)
- The Fix (now on STV Player)
- Free for All
- Futurama (now on Disney+)
- G-String Divas
- Gang Related
- The Gifted (now on Disney+
- The Grinder
- Highlander: The Series
- Huff
- JAG
- Kenny vs. Spenny
- King of the Hill (now on Disney+)
- L.A.'s Finest (now on Prime Video)
- Land of the Giants
- Law & Order: Criminal Intent (now on LG channels ,Sky Witness and 5USA)
- Legion (now on Disney+)
- Leverage (now on Prime Video)
- Lost in Space
- Louie
- Low Winter Sun(now on Freevee)
- Lucifer (now on Netflix)
- Lucky
- The Man Show
- Marvel's Agent Carter (now on Disney+)
- Medium
- The Mind of the Married Man
- Michael Hayes
- Minority Report
- Monk (now on Prime Video)
- Mr Inbetween (now on Disney+)
- Murder in the First
- Next (now on Disney+)
- No Signal!
- NYPD Blue (now on Disney+)
- The Orville (now on Disney+)
- Outcast
- Outmatched
- The Passage (now on Disney+)
- Penn and Teller: Bulls**t!
- People of Earth
- Perfect Harmony
- Playmakers
- Prison Break (now on Disney+ and U)
- Reno 911!
- Rick and Morty (now on HBO Max)
- The Shield
- Shots Fired
- Stan Against Evil (now om ITVX
- Talking Dead
- Taxicab Confessions
- Those Who Kill (now on STV Player)
- Tim & Eric's Bedtime Stories
- The Time Tunnel
- Tour of Duty
- Trash to Cash
- True Blood (now on HBO Max)
- Tyrant
- Viper
- Voyage to the Bottom of the Sea
- Wayward Pines
- The Venture Bros.
- The Walking Dead(now on Disney+, Prime Video and Sky One)
- War of the Worlds (Series 1 only) (now on Disney
- The Wire (Now on HBO Max)
- Wolf Creek (now on Prime Video)
- The X-Files (now on Disney+, Channel 5 and Paramount+)
- Your Pretty Face Is Going to Hell
