= The Mating Game (TV series) =

British nature documentary television series

- Genre: Nature documentary
- Directed by: Jeff Wilson; Simon Nash; Joe Loncraine
- Narrated by: David Attenborough
- Country of origin: United Kingdom
- Original language: English
- No. of episodes: 5

Production
- Executive producer: Keith Scholey
- Producer: Jeff Wilson
- Running time: 60 minutes
- Production company: Silverback Films

Original release
- Network: BBC One
- Release: 3 October – 31 October 2021

Related
- The Hunt; Parenthood

The Mating Game is a British nature documentary series produced by Silverback Films for BBC Television and Discovery first aired on BBC One in 2021. The narrator is David Attenborough, the series producer is Jeff Wilson and the executive producer is Keith Scholey.

The five-part series explores animal courtship, seduction techniques and reproduction across diverse habitats. The first four episodes each focus on mating strategies within a particular ecosystem: grasslands, oceans, jungles and freshwater. The final episode looks at the extreme lengths some animals can resort to in order to reproduce.

== Production ==
The Mating Game was announced by the BBC in February 2019 as part of an extensive slate of natural history commissions. The announcement revealed that the series would be filmed in 8K resolution and would be ready for transmission in 2021.

The series was produced for the BBC and Discovery by Silverback Films, continuing a creative partnership established with forerunners The Hunt (2015) and A Perfect Planet (2021). International co-production partners included France Télévisions, China's Bilibili and Japan's NHK.

Travel restrictions caused by the COVID-19 pandemic forced producers to find a new approach to filming on location. Rather than flying UK-based film crews to remote locations around the globe, the production team relied on local filmmakers to capture key sequences. Two of these sequences included male African bullfrogs fighting over mates and schools of manta rays convening off the Australian coast to breed.

A 271-person crew filmed on location, recording over 9,000 hours of 80 animal species in 22 countries. For the "Oceans" episode, the crew spent 150 days at sea and logged over 500 hours of diving.

In September 2021, the BBC announced pre-sales of The Mating Game to DR in Denmark and NRK in Norway, along with Canada (Radio-Canada), Estonia (ETV), Spain (Movistar+), New Zealand (TVNZ) and Lithuania (LRT).

== Broadcast ==
The series debuted on British television on 3 October 2021, broadcast on BBC One and BBC One HD. Subsequent episodes aired in the same Sunday evening timeslot each week. Each episode was made available on BBC iPlayer immediately after broadcast. In the United States, The Mating Game premiered on Discovery+ beginning 3 November 2021.

== Episodes ==
No.	Title	Directed by	Original release date	UK viewers (millions)
1	"Grasslands: In Plain Sight"	Jeff Wilson	3 October 2021	3.978
2	"Oceans: Out of the Blue"	Simon Nash	10 October 2021	3.258
3	"Jungles: In the Thick of It"	Joe Loncraine	17 October 2021	3.486
4	"Freshwater: Timing is Everything"	Joe Loncraine	24 October 2021	n/a
5	"Against All Odds"	Simon Nash	31 October 2021	n/a
