= Fever Pitch: The Rise of the Premier League =

2021 British documentary television series

- Genre: Documentary
- Country of origin: United Kingdom
- Original language: English
- No. of series: 2
- No. of episodes: 8

Original release
- Network: BBC Two
- Release: 6 September 2021 – 28 August 2023

Fever Pitch: The Rise of the Premier League is a documentary series broadcast on BBC Two from 2021 to 2023, in 2 four-part seasons. The series is about the foundation and early years of the Premier League.

The series was distributed to streaming platforms around the world. It was praised for its production and its interviews, though some reviewers found it focused too much on Manchester United and omitted fan voices and criticisms of the league.

== Synopsis ==
The series covers the foundation of the Premier League, starting with football hooliganism events such as 1985's Heysel disaster that led to declining attendances in the late 1980s, and going on to the £300 million deal made by Rupert Murdoch to broadcast the new league on Sky Sports. The first episode covers Manchester United's victory in the opening 1992–93 season, including the arrival of Eric Cantona from defending champions Leeds United. The series later covers Blackburn Rovers' win in 1994–95, spearheaded by Alan Shearer. The series later covers Cantona's assault on a fan, and the rivalry between Manchester United manager Alex Ferguson and Arsenal's Arsène Wenger. Keith Gillespie, who was traded from Manchester United to Newcastle United as part of a transfer for Andy Cole, discusses his gambling problems.

== Production and distribution ==
The series was produced by Story Films and Studio 99, the latter being owned by David Beckham, who is one of the interviewed footballers. The series was carried by Amazon Prime in Canada, Australia and New Zealand; RTL in German-speaking Europe; Telefónica in Spain and Discovery+ in India, among others.

== Reception ==
Stuart Jeffries of The Guardian gave the series three stars out of five, concluding that it gave Cantona disproportionate credit for Manchester United's success: "The legend of Eric the redeemer, as much as the idea that the Premier League has made football beautiful anew, can be exaggerated".

On Football 365, Ian King praised the production values and archive footage, but criticised the series for "bias by omission" and disproportionate coverage of Manchester United. Among his cited omissions were opposition to the founding of the league, and the conflict of interest of Tottenham Hotspur chairman Alan Sugar that led to satellite channel Sky and not terrestrial channel ITV becoming the broadcast partners. Phil Cunnington of the Lancashire Evening Post, a fan of lower-league team Tranmere Rovers, called the series "glossy yet superficial" for consisting of iconic clips while having little input from fans.

Emily Baker of the i gave a four-star review, praising the interviews with Cantona and Shearer, and James Croots wrote a positive review on New Zealand's Stuff.co.nz web portal. Several reviewers, such as James Walton for The Spectator, were amused by archive clips of Sky's unsuccessful attempts to bring American-style entertainment – such as cheerleaders and half-time shows – to English football.
