= Libera discography =

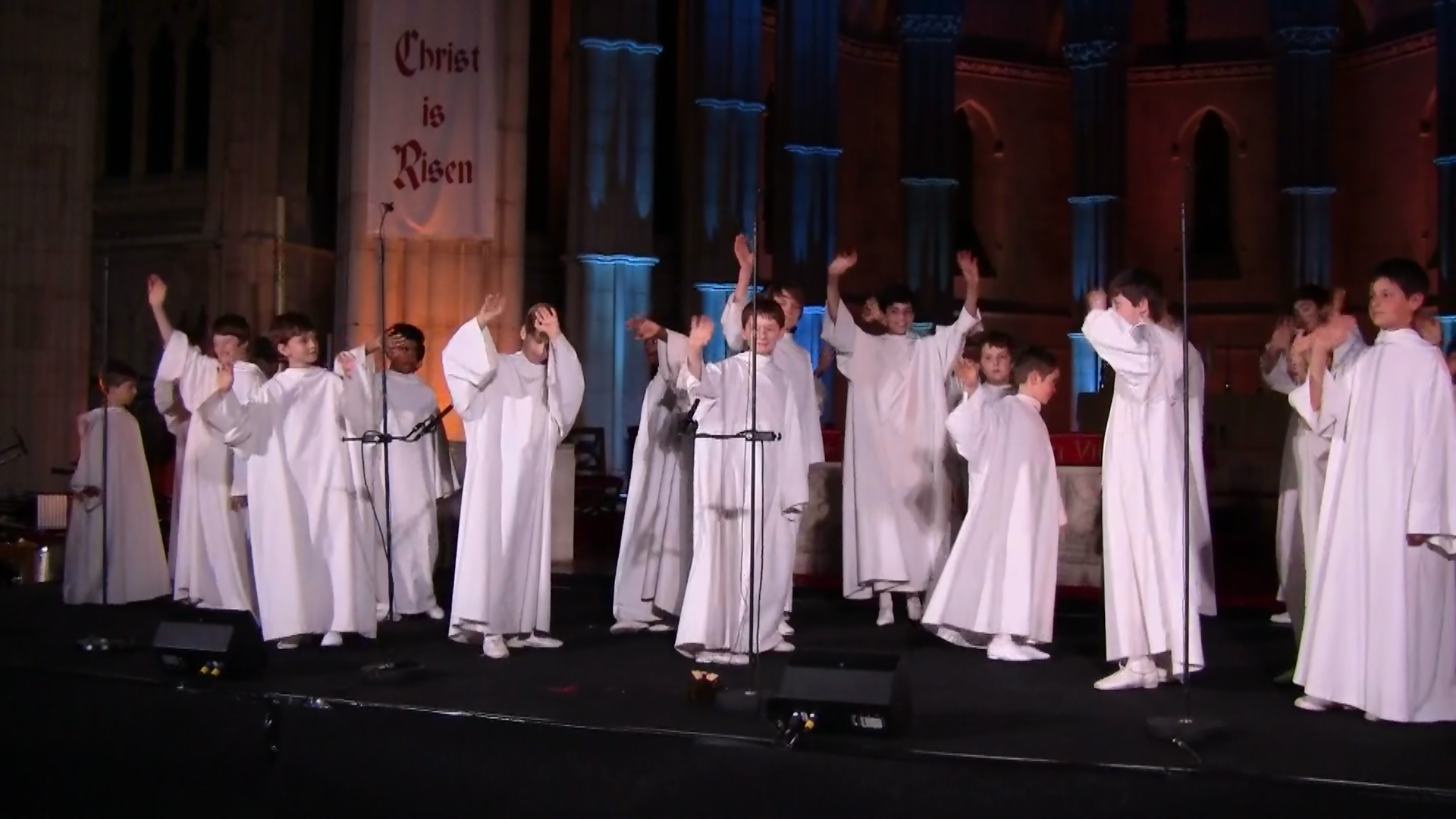
- Libera in concert at Arundel, May 2014
- Studio albums: 13
- EPs: 1
- Live albums: 3
- Compilation albums: 10
- Singles: 6
- Video albums: 3

Libera is an all-boy English vocal group directed by Robert Prizeman. Their discography consists of 13 studio albums, three live albums, ten compilation albums, three video albums, an extended play, and six singles. Their early works were released under the names St. Philip's Choir and Angel Voices.

== Albums ==
=== Studio albums ===
==== As St. Philip's Choir / Angel Voices ====
List of studio albums
| Title | Album details |
|---|---|
| Sing For Ever | Released: 1988; Label: BBC Enterprises; Format: CD, cassette, LP |
| New Day | Released: 1990; Label: BMG Music UK; Format: CD |
| Angel Voices | Released: 1992; Label: Q TV; Format: CD |
| Angel Voices 2 | Released: August 1996; Label: MCI Records; Format: CD |
| Angel Voices 3 | Released: October 1997; Label: MCI Records; Format: CD |

==== As Libera ====
List of studio albums, with selected chart positions
| Title | Album details | Peak chart positions | | |
| Title | Album details | JPN | JPN Class | US Class |
|---|---|---|---|---|
| Libera | Released: 24 September 1999; Label: Warner Classics; Format: CD, digital download | — | — | 14 |
| Luminosa | Released: 10 August 2001; Label: Warner Classics; Format: CD, digital download | — | — | 32 |
| Free | Released: 27 September 2004; Label: EMI Classics; Format: CD, digital download | 143 | — | — |
| Visions | Released: 7 November 2005; Label: EMI Classics; Format: CD, digital download | 150 | — | — |
| Angel Voices | Released: 6 November 2006; Label: EMI Classics; Format: CD, digital download | 75 | — | 21 |
| New Dawn | Released: 3 March 2008; Label: EMI Classics; Format: CD, digital download | 164 | — | 29 |
| Peace | Released: 8 March 2010; Label: EMI Classics; Format: CD, digital download | 71 | 3 | 8 |
| The Christmas Album | Released: 1 November 2011; Label: EMI Classics; Format: CD, digital download | 169 | 5 | 15 |
| Hope | Released: 26 May 2017; Label: Libera Music / Invisible Hands Music; Format: CD, digital download | | | |
| Beyond | Released: 12 October 2018; Label: Libera Music / Invisible Hands Music; Format: CD, digital download | | | |
| Christmas Carols with Libera | Released: 15 November 2019; Label: Libera Music / Invisible Hands Music; Format: CD, digital download | | | |
"—" denotes releases that did not chart or were not released in that region.

=== Live albums ===
List of live albums, with selected chart positions and sales figures
| Title | Album details | Peak chart positions | | | | | Sales |
| Title | Album details | JPN | JPN Class | KOR Int | US Class | US Heat | Sales |
|---|---|---|---|---|---|---|---|
| Angel Voices: Libera In Concert | Released: 28 September 2007; Label: EMI Classics; Format: CD, digital download | — | — | — | 20 | — | |
| Angels Sing: Christmas in Ireland | Released: 28 October 2013; Label: Warner Classics; Format: CD, digital download | 220 | 2 | — | 15 | 8 | |
| Angels Sing: Libera in America | Released: 28 February 2015; Label: Warner Classics; Format: CD, digital download | 298 | 5 | 7 | 8 | — | KOR: 441 |
"—" denotes releases that did not chart or were not released in that region.

=== Compilation albums ===
==== As Libera ====
List of compilation albums, with selected chart positions and sales figures
| Title | Album details | Peak chart positions | | | | | | | | Sales |
| Title | Album details | UK | UK Class | JPN Oricon | JPN Top | JPN Class | KOR | KOR Int | US Class | Sales |
|---|---|---|---|---|---|---|---|---|---|---|
| Complete Libera | Released: 1 September 2002; Label: Warner Classics; Format: CD, digital download | — | — | — | — | — | — | — | — | |
| Welcome to Libera's World (彼方の光, Kanata No Hikari) | Released: 1 February 2006; Label: EMI Classics; Format: CD | — | — | 42 | — | — | — | — | — | |
| Pray: You Were There (祈り〜あなたがいるから, Inori 〜 Anata ga irukara) | Released: 10 December 2008; Label: EMI Music Japan; Format: CD, digital download | — | — | 56 | — | 1 | — | — | — | |
| Eternal: The Best of Libera | Released: 15 December 2008; Label: EMI Classics; Format: CD, digital download | 99 | 2 | — | — | — | — | 68 | 31 | |
| Angel Voices 2012 | Released: 14 March 2012; Label: EMI Classics; Format: CD, digital download | — | — | 37 | 31 | 1 | — | — | — | |
| Song of Life: A Collection | Released: 22 October 2012; Label: EMI Classics; Format: CD, digital download | — | — | — | — | — | 27 | 6 | — | KOR: 1,068 |
| Ave Maria | Released: 7 November 2012; Label: Universal Music Japan; Format: CD | — | — | 136 | — | 2 | — | — | — | |
| I Am the Day: The Best of Libera | Released: 26 March 2014; Label: Warner Music Japan; Format: CD | — | — | — | — | — | — | — | — | |
"—" denotes releases that did not chart or were not released in that region.

==== As St. Philip's Choir / Angel Voices ====
List of compilation albums
| Title | Album details |
|---|---|
| Angel Voices: Peace on Earth | Released: 2003; Format: CD |
| The Best of Angel Voices | Released: August 2011; Label: Varèse Sarabande; Format: CD, digital download |

=== EPs ===
List of extended plays, with selected chart positions
| Title | Album details | Peak chart positions | |
| Title | Album details | JPN | JPN Class |
|---|---|---|---|
| Song of Life (生命の奇跡, Seimei no kiseki) | Released: 13 April 2011; Label: EMI Music Japan; Format: CD, digital download | 85 | 1 |

=== Video albums ===
List of video albums, with selected chart positions
| Title | Album details | Peak chart positions | |
| Title | Album details | JPN | US |
|---|---|---|---|
| Angel Voices: Libera In Concert | Released: 2 October 2007; Label: EMI Classics; Format: DVD | 236 | — |
| Angels Sing: Christmas in Ireland | Released: 5 November 2013; Label: Warner Classics; Format: DVD | — | 33 |
| Angels Sing: Libera in America | Released: 3 March 2015; Label: Warner Classics; Format: Blu-ray, DVD | — | 4 |
"—" denotes releases that did not chart or were not released in that region.

== Singles ==
| Title | Year | Peak chart positions | Album |
| Title | Year | UK | Album |
|---|---|---|---|
| "Sing For Ever" | 1987 | 49 | Sing For Ever |
| "Adoramus" | 1988 | — | Sing For Ever |
| "Libera" | 1995 | 88 | Libera |
| "Salva Me" | 1999 | — | Libera |
| "Love and Mercy" | 2008 | — | New Dawn |
| "What a Wonderful World" | 2015 | — | Angels Sing: Libera in America |
| "America the Beautiful" | 2015 | — | Angels Sing: Libera in America |
"—" denotes releases that did not chart or were not released in that region.

== Other charted songs ==
| Title | Year | Peak chart positions | | Album |
| Title | Year | UK Class | KOR Int | Album |
|---|---|---|---|---|
| "Sanctus" | 2011 | — | 69 | Kolleen Selects |
| "Carol of the Bells" | 2011 | 2 | — | The Christmas Album |
"—" denotes releases that did not chart or were not released in that region.
