= Red Hot Chilli Pipers =

Celtic rock band from Scotland

Background information
- Origin: Scotland
- Genres: Celtic rock
- Years active: 2002–present
- Label: REL Records Ltd
- Members: Dean Mollon; Kevin MacDonald; Malcolm McEwan; Steven Richmond
- Past members: Willie Armstrong; Stuart Cassells; Steven Graham
- Website: rhcp.scot

Red Hot Chilli Pipers is a Celtic rock band from Scotland. Formed in 2002, the band became popular internationally in 2007 after winning the BBC talent show When Will I Be Famous?

The band's lineup features three highland bagpipers and traditional marching snare, backed by a five- to seven-piece band. The band's live show also features vocal performances and highland dancing.

== History ==
Since their formation the Red Hot Chilli Pipers have combined guitars, keyboards, drums and their bagpipes to create 'bagrock' sound. The Red Hot Chilli Pipers perform a fusion of traditional pipe tunes and contemporary pieces. Notable covers performed have included "We Will Rock You" by Queen, "Clocks" by Coldplay and "Smoke on the Water" by Deep Purple as well as "Chasing Cars" by Snow Patrol, "Don't Stop Believing" by Journey.

In 2004, the group appeared on the main stage at T in the Park with the headline band, the rock group The Darkness. They appeared on BBC Radio 1 on the Greg James show in July 2013 and The Radio 1 Breakfast Show with Nick Grimshaw in 2014.

The group appears on the soundtrack of How to Train Your Dragon 2.

== Discography ==
- 2005 – The Red Hot Chilli Pipers
- 2007 – Bagrock to the Masses
- 2008 – Blast Live
- 2010 – Music for the Kilted Generation
- 2012 – Braveheart (live)
- 2013 – Breathe
- 2014 – Live at the Lake 2014
- 2016 – Octane
- 2019 – Fresh Air
- 2025 – Back to Roots

The band's first studio release The Red Hot Chilli Pipers (2005), was their least successful. Their 2007 album Bagrock to the Masses went platinum in Scotland and silver in the rest of the UK. Their third album and first live album, Blast Live (2008), went triple platinum in Scotland. Their fourth release Music for the Kilted Generation, The Red Hot Chilli Pipers' most successful International record to date, reached Number 2 on the US Amazon Chart. behind Adele's record-breaking album, 21. Breathe was released in July 2013 on CD and iTunes.

== Tours and performances ==
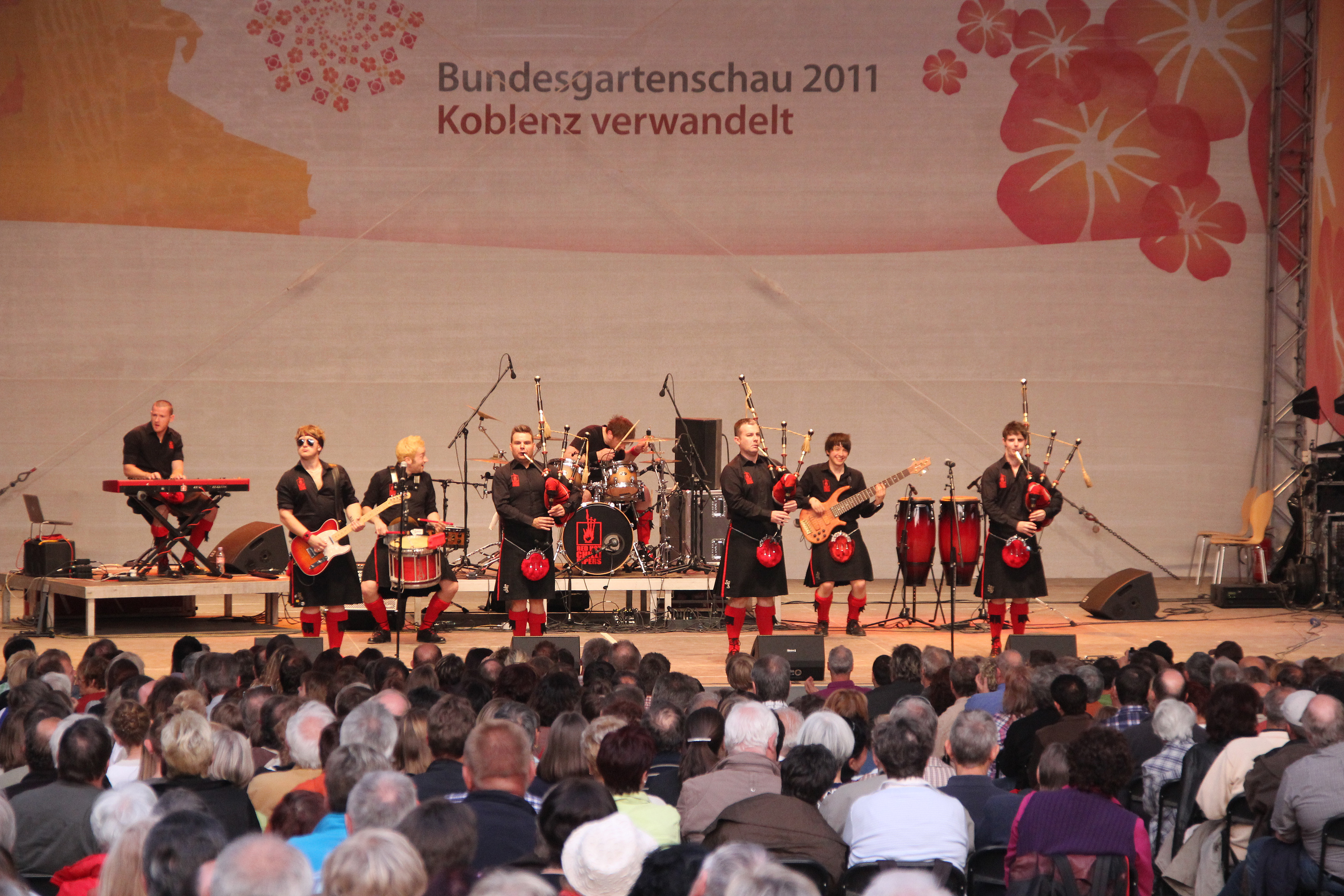
Red Hot Chilli Pipers in Koblenz 2011

The group's highest profile performance have been on the Main Stage at T in the Park in 2004 where they performed alongside The Darkness, and in 2014 when they performed on the Main Stage again in their own right. They performed on the Acoustic Stage at Glastonbury in 2024 and at The Fuji Rock Festival in 2025. January 2026 started with a month long residency at The Global Village in Dubai UAE.

=== When Will I Be Famous ===
In 2007, the Red Hot Chilli Pipers appeared on the BBC show When Will I be Famous? hosted by Graham Norton. The band were in the episode and competed against seven others. The eight contestants were paired into a head-to-head showdown in which the winner would be decided by 101 preregistered viewers who were dubbed the "Armchair Judges". The four winners of these head-to-heads would then compete against each other in the second show with the winner being decided by an open public phone vote. In their first head-to-head showdown, The Red Hot Chilli Pipers were pitted against the "Stringfever", a four-member string quartet. The Red Hot Chilli Pipers won the head-to-head 51–50 and went on to win the weekly prize of ten thousand pounds.

=== After TV appearance ===
In September 2008, the group performed a Scottish-flavoured medley of songs during the opening of Eurovision Dance Contest 2008 in Glasgow. In 2010, The Red Hot Chilli Pipers completed an 11-date sold-out tour of Scotland, as well as an 11-week tour of Germany and a 7-week tour of America. They also toured Saudi Arabia, Malaysia, India and most of Europe. They performed concerts in New York and Beijing as well as at the Hebridean Celtic Festival in Stornoway.

== Musicianship ==
With a total of four degrees from the Royal Conservatoire of Scotland, many of the band members past and present have competed at the highest level of bagpiping and drumming for many years. Founder and former Musical Director Cassells received BBC Radio Scotland Young Traditional Musician in 2005 and became the first person to attain a degree in bagpipes from the Royal Conservatoire of Scotland (Formerly the Royal Scottish Academy of Music and Drama). The snare drummer and percussionist, Grant Cassidy is an 8 time Juvenile Solo World Drumming Champion and in 2016 placed 7th in the adult section of the World Solo Drumming Championships held in Glasgow, Scotland. Current members (2025) include Grade 1 pipers Andrew Brodlie and Ross Miller.

== Former members ==
Founder and frontman Stuart Cassells left the band in 2011, due to focal dystonia. He was replaced by Kyle Warren of Field Marshal Montgomery Pipe Band.

== Awards and nominations ==
=== Scottish Live Act of the Year ===
Year	Nominee / work	Award	Result
2007	Red Hot Chilli Pipers	Scottish Live Act of the Year	Won
2010	Red Hot Chilli Pipers	Scottish Live Act of the Year	Won

=== BBC's 'When Will I Be Famous' ===
- Winners 2007
