= Victoria Jones =

Victoria or Vicky Jones may refer to:

- Vicky Jones (born 1978), English theatre director and writer
- V. M. Jones, children's author
- Victoria Jones, a contestant on The One and Only, a 2008 BBC reality contest series
- Victoria Jones, a character in Bhowani Junction, a novel by John Masters (also in the film adaptation)
- Vicky Jones (singer), a contestant on the third series of The Voice UK
- Vicky Clement-Jones, Hong Kong-born English physician and medical researcher
- Vicky Jones (footballer) who played Football at the 2009 Summer Universiade
- Victoria Jones (actress), daughter of American actor Tommy Lee Jones
