= Camden Stewart =

British composer, pianist and operatic tenor (born 2004)

- Born: 2004 (age 21–22)
- Occupations: Composer, pianist, operatic tenor
- Years active: 2022–present

Camden Stewart (born 2004) is a British composer, pianist, and operatic tenor whose work combines contemporary classical piano with operatic voice. He first became known for videos of his public performances shared on social media.

== Early life and education ==
Stewart grew up in London and sang for approximately ten years with the Libera choir before studying at the Guildhall School of Music and Drama. During this period, he took private piano lessons while training as a boy soprano, later developing an interest in composition.

== Career ==
Stewart first performed publicly at a piano in London’s St Pancras railway station while preparing for his Grade 8 examination. He later shared videos of his performances online, where his posts on TikTok and other platforms attracted an initial audience.

His performances combine classical piano improvisation with operatic singing and have been described by Classic FM as “blending contemporary classical piano with licks of operatic vocal”. He has stated that he aims to use public performance to broaden access to classical music.

In 2022, Stewart was appointed a Young Ambassador of the Lang Lang International Music Foundation.

In March 2025, several media outlets reported on a viral video showing Stewart being verbally accosted while performing at a public piano.

In February 2026, Stewart was selected as one of Classic FM’s “Rising Stars”, an annual selection of 30 classical musicians under 30.

== Discography ==
=== Studio albums ===
- Truly Yours (2022)
- Transcendence (2025)

=== Extended plays ===
- Lost (2023)

=== Singles ===
- "Emotional Intelligence" (2023)
- "Me Vider la Tête" (2023)
- "Water" (2025)
