= When Will I Be Famous? (TV series) =

- Genre: Talent
- Starring: Graham Norton
- Country of origin: United Kingdom
- No. of series: 1
- No. of episodes: 4

Production
- Running time: 30 minutes

Original release
- Network: BBC One
- Release: 3 February – 24 February 2007

When Will I Be Famous? is a British variety television show hosted by Graham Norton which first aired on BBC One on Saturday 3 February 2007.

== Format ==
The show is presented live and centres on various entertainment acts by -often unknown- performers. Each act performs in a head to head showdown with celebrity judges, Dave Spikey, Max Clifford and Chuck Harris and an 'armchair panel' of 101 viewers at home deciding which was best. The winners went through to the final later in the evening, where a public vote decides who would win the weekly £10,000 prize. Winners of the four shows include the Skating Aratas, Red Hot Chilli Pipers and British boy vocal group Libera.
