= Would You Rather...? with Graham Norton =

- Graham Norton and four panelists play Would You Rather...?
- Also known as: Would You Rather...? WYR...?
- Genre: Comedy
- Directed by: Alexander Vietmeier
- Presented by: Graham Norton
- Country of origin: United States
- Original language: English
- No. of series: 1
- No. of episodes: 13 (list of episodes)

Production
- Executive producers: Graham Norton; Graham Stuart; Jim Biederman
- Production location: Manhattan Center
- Running time: 30 minutes
- Production company: So Television

Original release
- Network: BBC America
- Release: 3 December 2011 – 25 February 2012

Related
- The Graham Norton Show

Would You Rather...? with Graham Norton is a panel game hosted by Graham Norton on BBC America. The show features a panel of American comedians and celebrities who answer "would you rather" questions in the style of the popular parlor game. An example of a question used on the program is, "Would you rather watch your parents have sex every day for a year, or join in once just to make it stop?" The show premiered on 3 December 2011, in its regular time slot of Saturdays at 11 pm following The Graham Norton Show.

Would You Rather...? is notable as being among BBC America's first efforts at original programming, as the channel initially focused on imports from the UK. The show is part of the channel's strategy to create new American programs as companions to the channel's established British hits, such as, in this case, The Graham Norton Show. Would You Rather...? is also one of the few examples of the panel game genre in America, and it is the first panel game to air on BBC America.

Each episode features four panelists who answer questions in three acts. Each question is worth five points, with a possible perfect total of 35.

BBC America ordered 13 episodes of Would You Rather...? for series 1. The episodes were recorded in New York at Manhattan Center in September and October 2011. Panelists included Whoopi Goldberg, Cyndi Lauper, Stanley Tucci, Alan Cumming, Scott Adsit, Judah Friedlander, Baron Vaughn, Michael Ian Black, Mo Rocca, Eugene Mirman, Faith Salie, Dave Hill, Jessi Klein, Andrea Rosen, Christian Finnegan, Leo Allen, Hannibal Buress, Janet Varney, Joe Mande, Jordan Carlos, Michelle Buteau, Sam Seder and Sherrod Small.

Reviews of the show have been generally positive. According to The New York Times' Neil Genzlinger, the show "proves that a fair amount of fun can be generated simply by putting people in chairs and letting them crack wise." Variety's Brian Lowry called the show "a bit of loopy fun." And The San Francisco Chronicle's David Wiegand said that, "As the silly questions, the sillier answers and Norton's ever-burbling laughter continue, we raise the white flag and start laughing." But Media Life Magazine's Tom Conroy compares the show to panel games in the UK, saying the quips on Would You Rather...? "aren't as quick or clever as they would be on a similar British show."

The program is produced by Norton's So Television and executive produced by Norton, Graham Stuart and Jim Biederman. Stuart also executive produces The Graham Norton Show for So Television, the production company Norton and Stuart co-own.

== Episodes ==
As of February 18, 2012, 12 episodes have aired.

No.	Title	Panelists	Original release date
1	"Episode 1"	Stanley Tucci, Sherrod Small, Jordan Carlos and Scott Adsit	3 December 2011
2	"Episode 2"	Cyndi Lauper, Michelle Buteau, Christian Finnegan and Joe Mande	3 December 2011
3	"Episode 3"	Alan Cumming, Faith Salie, Scott Adsit and Dave Hill	10 December 2011
4	"Episode 4"	Mo Rocca, Andrea Rosen, Judah Friedlander and Hannibal Buress	17 December 2011
5	"Episode 5"	Eugene Mirman, Hannibal Buress, Mo Rocca and Andrea Rosen	24 December 2011
6	"Episode 6"	Stanley Tucci, Jordan Carlos, Scott Adsit and Faith Salie	7 January 2012
7	"Episode 7"	Faith Salie, Sherrod Small, Jessi Klein and Dave Hill	14 January 2012
8	"Episode 8"	Baron Vaughn, Christian Finnegan, Dave Hill and Jessi Klein	21 January 2012
9	"Episode 9"	Sam Seder, Jessi Klein, Christian Finnegan and Michelle Buteau	28 January 2012
10	"Episode 10"	Joe Mande, Jessi Klein, Christian Finnegan and Sam Seder	4 February 2012
11	"Episode 11"	Scott Adsit, Faith Salie, Alan Cumming and Dave Hill	11 February 2012
12	"Episode 12"	Judah Friedlander, Janet Varney, Michael Ian Black and Leo Allen	18 February 2012
13	"Episode 13"	Whoopi Goldberg, Janet Varney, Leo Allen and Michael Ian Black	25 February 2012
