= Libera (choir) =

Musical group

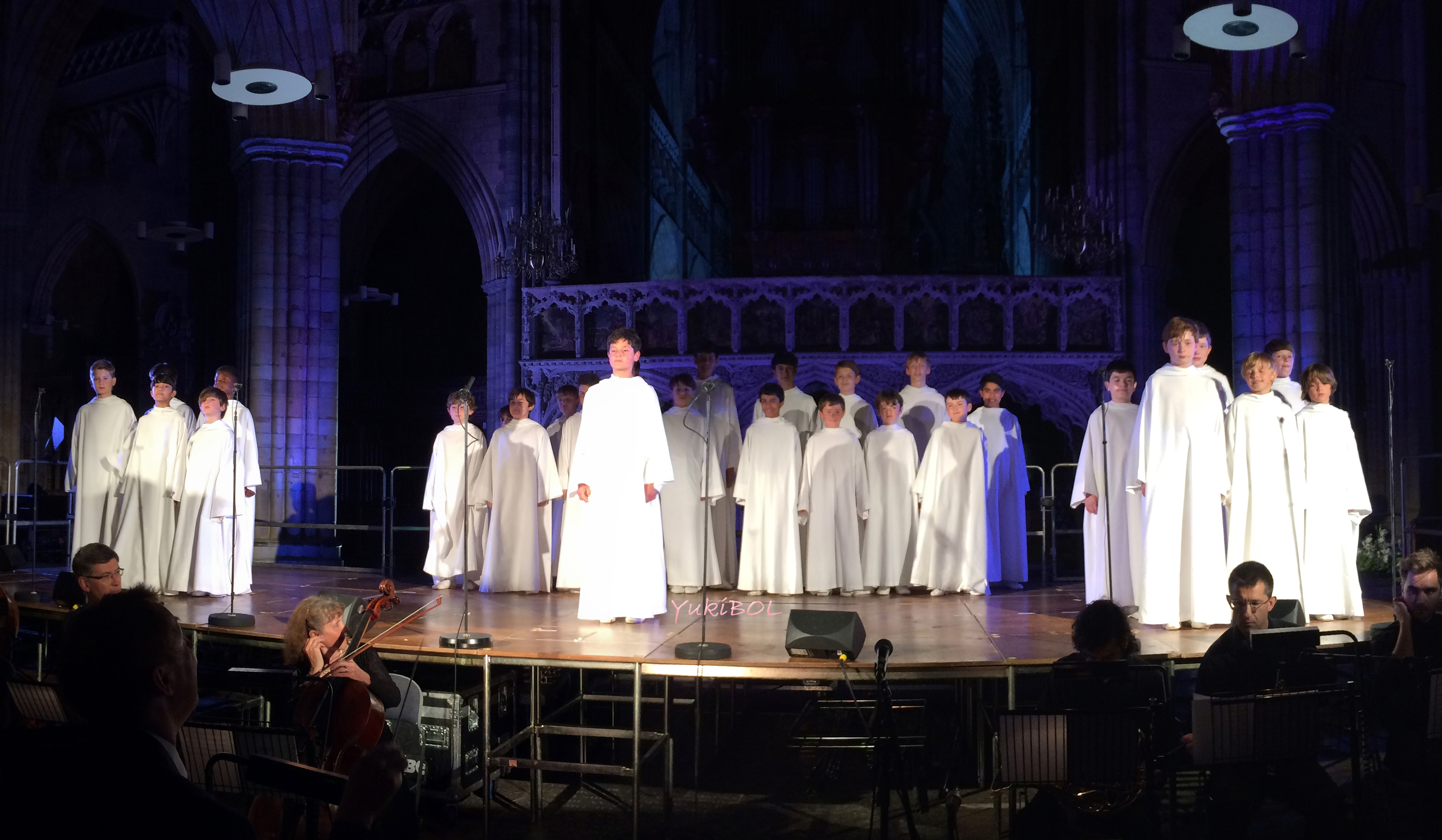
- Libera in concert, July 2015

Background information
- Also known as: Angel Voices
- Origin: London, England
- Genre: Classical crossover
- Years active: 1995–present
- Labels: Warner Classics, EMI Classics, IHM/Libera Music
- Website: libera.org.uk

Libera is an all-boys English vocal group founded by Robert Prizeman. Libera performs concerts in many countries, including the UK, the US and throughout Asia, and often makes recordings for their own album releases and other projects.

Many members also sing in the parish choir of St. Philip's, Norbury, in South London. According to a 2009 Songs of Praise TV special, the group usually consists of approximately 40 members between the ages of seven and 16, including new members who are not yet ready to participate fully in albums or tours. The group recruits from a variety of backgrounds in the London area, and does not require its members to belong to any specific denomination.

In addition to recording albums, touring and making TV appearances as Libera, the group sings on a weekly basis as part of the full choir of men and boys at parish choral services. Libera is run as a not-for-profit registered UK charity, "providing the opportunity for suitable boys to train as vocalists from any background". Although members are not paid for their work within Libera, their expenses are covered when touring.

The group's name comes from its signature song, "Libera", which is based on the "Libera Me" portion of the Requiem Mass. Libera is the Latin singular imperative of liberare, meaning "free me/him/her".

== History ==
The Anglican (High Church) parish of St Philip's, Norbury has a long choral tradition. Their first non-traditional commercial work was in 1984, when the boys of St Philip's Choir backed Sal Solo on his song "San Damiano". In 1987, the boys of St Philip's Choir released the single "Sing for Ever". In 1988, the choir released the single "Adoramus" and their first full commercial album, Sing For Ever under the name St Philip's Choir. The title track for this album was chosen by the BBC as the first Children in Need telethon anthem.

The second album, New Day, released in 1990, was the first album to use the name Angel Voices. During the 1990s, the names "St Philip's Boys' Choir" and "Angel Voices" were both used to refer to the choir. The third album, Angel Voices, was released in 1992. It was re-released in 1993, with the choir referred to as St Philip's Boys' Choir. Angel Voices 2 was released in 1996 and Angel Voices 3 was released in 1997. Both were released under the name of St Philip's Boys' Choir, by the record label MCI.

In 1995, Robert Prizeman released a single and a CD, Libera. The CD comprised seven remixes of his original song, "Libera". The first four tracks feature Libera with Daren Geraghty as the main soloist; the last 3 tracks are performed by other artists. In the same year, the choir, calling itself Libera, performed the song on the TV programme Sunday Live. In 1999, the choir released another album entitled Libera, published by Warner Classics. From then on, the choir has been consistently referred to as "Libera" when acting in its commercial capacity. The next Libera album, Luminosa, was released by Warner Classics in 2001. In 2003, Warner Classics re-released Libera and Luminosa as a double CD set entitled Complete Libera. In 2004, Libera signed a contract with EMI. Their first EMI album was Free. Visions came out in 2005. Libera's 2006 album, Angel Voices, was nominated Album of the Year by the Classical Brit Awards. New Dawn was released in March 2008. In December 2008, they released their first double CD entitled Eternal (The best of Libera) which contains 26 tracks taken from earlier albums and six new tracks. Their album Peace was released in 2010. November 2011 saw the release of Libera: The Christmas Album. Libera remained under contract with EMI until its acquisition by Warner Music Group in 2013. While contracted to WMG, the group made two DVDs and released soundtrack CDs before entering into a partnership with the independent label Invisible Hands Music in 2016, with which they have released 8 physical CDs, plus a Digital Album during the 2020 pandemic.

== Libera as a charity ==
Libera became a registered charity in 2009 under the guidance of the late Steven Philipp (whose son Ben was a soloist in the choir). A branch of this charity was established in the United States in 2014.

== Television appearances and concerts ==
As Angel Voices, the group made frequent appearances on UK television, mostly on the BBC. During the earlier years as Libera, the group seldom made TV appearances or gave concerts. It is only since the group became a registered charity in the UK, whereby all decisions are made by a board of trustees consisting largely of parents of members, that Libera have made regular tours (usually three times a year) and more frequent TV appearances.

Major roles in the 1992 TV programme Titchmarsh on Song, presented by Alan Titchmarsh, and the 1993 TV programme Thora on the Straight and Narrow, introduced Angel Voices to a wider public. The programme featured the first public performance of the song "De Profundis", which would become "Libera" and give the choir its name. Libera has made numerous music videos for Songs of Praise and Classic FM TV. Other TV appearances include guest spots on GMTV, Blue Peter, Sunday Live, Christmas Cooks, Top of the Pops, Wogan, and Last Choir Standing. In 1994, St. Philip's Choir sang in an episode of the TV series Poirot. In 2003, Libera was the last act to perform on the UK version of the famous TV series This is your Life; they performed for guest Aled Jones. During the episode, it was mentioned that Libera had performed at Aled Jones's wedding. In February 2007, Libera appeared on the television contest When Will I Be Famous? presented by Graham Norton on BBC One. They won, and were invited back the following week. Libera has made several TV appearances in Japan and Korea, and the group also recorded the signature tune for Songs of Praise. Their rendition of "How Can I Keep From Singing" was featured on a British television ad for Waitrose.

On 30 and 31 May 2007, Libera recorded two free concert performances at the Pieterskerk in Leiden, the Netherlands, with the cooperation of American Public Television. Footage from the performances was combined to create the TV special Angel Voices: Libera in Concert. The programme was featured on Public Broadcasting Service channels in the United States and released by EMI on DVD and CD. The DVD includes a bonus feature entitled "Libera in Their Own Words", which features interviews with some of the boys.

A 35-minute special about Libera aired in January 2009 as an episode of the BBC1 TV show Songs of Praise.

On 22 December 2013, Libera were featured singing an arrangement of Silent Night in the BBC1 Songs of Praise Christmas Big Sing, recorded in the Royal Albert Hall.

See the comprehensive list of Libera's TV appearances, concerts, and other relevant data further down this page.

== Supporting roles ==
Libera has provided choral backing to a number of artists, including Aled Jones, Björk, Luciano Pavarotti, Hayley Westenra, Peter Skellern, José Carreras, Neil Diamond, Cliff Richard, and Michael Crawford. Libera has also sung for several film soundtracks, including Romeo + Juliet, The Merchant of Venice, Shadowlands and Hannibal. A film preview for The Curious Case of Benjamin Button uses a brief selection from one of their songs, but they do not appear in the film's final soundtrack.

Several Libera members have performed solo work outside Libera while remaining members of the choir. For example, Tom Cully sang for Silence, Night and Dreams by Zbigniew Preisner, and can be heard singing in an episode of the British television series Foyle's War. In 2002, Libera member Steven Geraghty was a featured soloist for the soundtrack of the PlayStation 2 game Ico. More recently, Libera member Ciaran Bradbury-Hickey helped to record the soundtrack of Road, a short film about motorbike racing. Former Libera member Ben Crawley did solo work for Paul Joyce's production of The Snow Queen in 2004.

== Style ==
=== Music ===
Libera has a distinctive sound. All its singers are boys, most with unbroken boy soprano (also known as treble) voices, with those boys in their early teens singing the lowest parts. Almost all their songs are either new compositions by Robert Prizeman or new arrangements of classical and contemporary tunes. Prizeman often composed and arranged pieces with individual soloists in mind, to emphasise the variety of characteristics and qualities in the boys' voices. His compositions blended innovative textures, meditative soloists and vibrant ecstatic chorus harmonies that stretch across the entire range of the boys' voices. Libera's music frequently combines elements of Gregorian chant, classical composers such as Debussy, Beethoven and Pachelbel, and contemporary pop and new age music. Some of their songs, such as "Sanctus", have appeared in different versions on several of their albums. Some more contemporary songs have been covered by the group, such as Enya's Orinoco Flow.

Most of Libera's lyrics come from traditional hymns, the Latin Rite liturgy, and contemporary songs by artists ranging from Brian Wilson and Billy Joel to Enya. However, lyrics from various poems and original lyrics are also used. For example, We are the Lost uses the poems "In Flanders Fields" by John McCrae and "For the Fallen" by Laurence Binyon, along with a single stanza from the British hymn, "O God, Our Help in Ages Past" by Isaac Watts. While most of the Libera's original lyrics are written by Robert Prizeman, other individuals, including former Libera soloist Steven Geraghty, have also contributed new lyrics to recent albums.

Libera uses a variety of instrumentation. Robert Prizeman, Ian Tilley and Steven Geraghty play electronic keyboards, piano and organ. Steven Geraghty also played clarinet on Free, Visions and Angel Voices, and percussion on Visions and Angel Voices. All their EMI albums feature Fiona Pears on violin. Angel Voices: Libera in Concert has additional backing by Il Novecento Orchestra. The City of Prague Philharmonic Orchestra provides the backing on their New Dawn album.

=== Clothing ===
For most of their performances, the boys of Libera wear distinctive white hooded robes based on monastic cowls. The boys can be seen wearing these robes on the covers of several albums. Other Libera uniforms include white or black hoodies and black trousers with light blue shirts. Some of their videos feature the boys wearing ordinary, casual clothing.

=== Cover art ===
Common motifs in the cover art on the choir's albums include birds, clouds and light, as well as pictures of the choristers. The 2017 release of Hope adapts this theme using a line drawing of robed choristers, and this theme has been refined during subsequent releases.

The 1993 release of Angel Voices, Angel Voices 2, Angel Voices 3, Libera, Luminosa and Welcome to Libera's World all feature white birds (presumably doves, the bird of peace) on their covers. Sing for Ever, the 1992 release of Angel Voices, Angel Voices: Libera in Concert and New Dawn show several of the boys dressed in white robes. Free and Visions both show a single, ghostly figure in white robes against a cloudy background. On the album Free, the ghostly figure featured is Callum Payne. The 2006 Angel Voices album shows several boys wearing what appear to be white hoodies.

== Discography ==
=== Singles ===
- "Sing for Ever" (1987)
- "Adoramus" (1988)
- "Libera" (1995)
- "Salva Me" (1999)
- "Love and Mercy" (2008)
- "Lead, Kindly Light" (2010)
- "What a Wonderful World" (2015)
- "America the Beautiful" (2015)
- "The Moon Represents My Heart" (2017)

=== Albums ===
As Angel Voices:

- Sing for Ever (1988), featuring Jaymi Bandtock, Jonathan Arthey, Ian Grimley, Sam Harper, Gareth Lowman and Mathew Arthey as vocal soloists.
- New Day (1990), featuring Robert Chee-A-Tow, Jaymi Bandtock and Gareth Lowman as vocal soloists.
- Angel Voices (1992), featuring Oliver Putland, Daren Geraghty and Anthony Maher as vocal soloists.
- Angel Voices 2 (1996), featuring Chris Baron, Daren Geraghty, Liam O'Kane as vocal soloists.
- Peace on Earth (1996)
- Angel Voices 3 (1997), featuring Liam O'Kane, Steven Geraghty, Adam Harris, Chris Baron and Alex Baron as vocal soloists.

As Libera:

- Libera (1995) There are seven tracks on this Disc Libera mixes, (Mercury Records Ltd.) London
- Libera (1999), featuring Liam O'Kane, Adam Harris, Steven Geraghty, Alex Baron as vocal soloists. No instrumentalists are credited on the album, however Robert Prizeman did the keyboard work.
- Luminosa (2001), featuring Steven Geraghty, Ben Crawley, Sam Coates, Simon Beston as vocal soloists.
- Complete Libera (2003), two-disc set with Libera and Luminosa.
- Free (2004), featuring Ben Crawley, Joseph Platt, Christopher Robson, Anthony Chadney and Raoul Neumann as vocal soloists, and Robert Prizeman, Fiona Pears, Dominic Kelly, Steven Geraghty, Chris Dodd, Ian Tilley and Helen Cole as instrumentalists.
- Visions (2005), featuring Tom Cully, Conor O'Donnell, Michael Horncastle, Joseph Sanders-Wilde, Callum Payne, James Vereycken as vocal soloists and Robert Prizeman as director, conductor and instrumentalist. Other instrumentalists included Ian Tilley, Fiona Pears, John Anderson, Steven Geraghty and Chris Dodd.
- Welcome to Libera's World (2006), featuring Joseph Platt, Ben Crawley, Liam O'Kane, Michael Horncastle and Joseph Sanders-Wilde as vocal soloists, and Robert Prizeman, Fiona Pears, John Anderson, Steven Geraghty, Chris Dodd, Ian Tilley as instrumentalists. The album was released only in Japan. Most of the tracks are re-released from the earlier albums. It includes only one new track, "Far Away".
- Angel Voices (2006), featuring Michael Horncastle, Ed Day, Connor O'Donnell, Tom Cully, Joshua Madine, Joseph Platt, Christopher Robson, Anthony Chadney, Joseph Sanders-Wilde and James Vereycken as vocal soloists, and Robert Prizeman, Fiona Pears, John Anderson, Steven Geraghty, Chris Dodd and Ian Tilley on various instruments.
- Angel Voices: Libera in Concert (2007), featuring Joshua Madine, Ben Philipp, Tom Cully, Ed Day, Liam Connery, Sam Leggett and Joe Snelling as vocal soloists, and Robert Prizeman, Fiona Pears, Steven Geraghty, Il Novecento Orchestra as instrumentalists.
- New Dawn (2008), featuring Tom Cully, Joshua Madine, Ed Day, Liam Connery, Joe Snelling and Benedict Philipp as vocal soloists. Robert Prizeman, Fiona Pears, Ian Tilley, Steven Geraghty, Sam Coates and the City of Prague Philharmonic Orchestra filled instrumental roles.
- Prayer: You Were There (2008), with Tom Cully, Ed Day, Joshua Madine, Liam Connery, Ben Crawley, Joseph Sanders-Wilde, Joseph Platt, Christopher Robson and Anthony Chadney as vocal soloists. The album was released only in Japan. Most of the tracks are re-releases from earlier albums.
- Eternal: The Best of Libera (2009), a two-disc compilation album with a mixture of old and new songs.
- Peace (2010), featuring Benedict Philipp, Joshua Madine, Tom Cully, Stefan Leadbeater, James Threadgill, Jakob De Menezes-Wood, Daniel Fontannaz, James Mordaunt and Ralph Skan as vocal soloists. The album was also released in a DeLuxe Edition.
- Miracle of Life (2011) was released only in Japan. "Song of Life" was used in a Japanese television drama.
- The St. Philip's Boys' Choir: The Best of Angel Voices (2011), a compilation of songs from Angel Voices (1992) and Angel Voices 2 (1996), from the period before the choir became known as Libera.
- Libera: The Christmas Album (2011), a Christmas album, also released in a deluxe edition and Japanese edition under the name Winter Songs.
- Angel Voices 2012, a special compilation CD for the Japanese market, was released for the April 2012 Spring Tour in Singapore and Japan.
- Song of Life: A Collection (2012), featuring a new song, "Song of Life", and songs from Free (2004), Visions (2005), Angel Voices (2006), Eternal (2008), New Dawn (2008), and Peace (2010).
- Angels Sing: Christmas in Ireland (2013), a live concert recording of Libera's performance at Armagh Cathedral.
- Angels Sing: Libera in America (2015), a live concert recording of Libera's performance at the Basilica of the National Shrine of the Immaculate Conception, in Washington, D.C., US in August 2014.
- Libera at Christmas (2016), featuring songs "Hymn to Mary" and "Santa Will Find You", and three re-recorded songs from Angels Sing: Christmas in Ireland (2013).
- Hope (2017), featuring Rocco Tesei, Camden Stewart, Alex Montoro, Gabriel Collins, Alessandro Mackinnon-Botti, Isaac London, Thomas Delgado-Little, Gregor Lumsden, Alex Gula, Merlin Brouwer and Ciaran Bradbury-Hickey as vocal soloists.
- Beyond (2018), featuring the song "In Paradisum" and renewed versions of "Sanctus", "Voca Me", and "Salve Regina". It has 11 tracks and was released on 12 October 2018.
- Christmas Carols with Libera (2019)
- If (2021)
- Forever (2023), the first release without the group's founder Robert Prizeman at the helm.
- Dream (2024)
- Wonder: An introduction to Libera (2025)
- Postcards (EP) (2026)

=== Film soundtracks ===
- Twelve Monkeys (1995)
- Romeo and Juliet (1996)
- Cousin Bette (1998)
- Hannibal (2001)
- The Merchant of Venice (2004)
- Nobody to watch over me (2008)
- The Greatest Miracle (2011)
- From the New World (novel) (2012 anime)
- Home Sweet Home Alone (2021, Disney)
- In Love and Deep Water (2023)
- Journey To Life (2025)

=== Supporting roles on albums and singles ===
As Angel Voices:

- San Damiano (1984), by Sal Solo
- Christmas Wrapping (1990), by Tony Robinson
- The Christmas Album, Vol 2 (1994), by Neil Diamond
- The Big Picture (1997), by Elton John

As Libera:

- Monastery of Chant (Two Discs) (2002) (Warner Music)
- Aled (2002), by Aled Jones
- Classical Smoothies (simply the best) Warner Classics 2002 (Warner Music UK)
- Higher (2003), by Aled Jones
- The Christmas Album (2004), by Aled Jones
- Aled's Christmas Carols (2008) by Aled Jones (DVD)
- Tchaikovsky, The Nutcracker, with Berlin Philharmonic cond. Simon Rattle (2009)
- Choirboys From Heaven : EMI Classics 2010 (EMI Records Ltd.)
- The Prayer (2010) by Classical Relief for Haiti (various artists)
- The Olympic Experience (2012) released by Warner Classics
- Christmas at Downton Abbey (2014) released by Warner Music TV
- Nia ~ Toward the Heavens from the Xenoblade Chronicles 3 Original Soundtrack with soloist Luca Brugnoli as boy Soprano.

== Concerts and appearances ==
Since becoming a registered charity in the UK, Libera has made numerous appearances on TV, radio, and in concert.

2000

- Plymouth, United Kingdom (St Andrew's Church, Plymouth) 26 October.
- Torquay, United Kingdom (St. Luke's Church) 27 October.

2002

- Upper Norwood, United Kingdom (St John the Evangelist, Upper Norwood) 2 March.

2005

- Upper Norwood, United Kingdom (St John the Evangelist, Upper Norwood) 4 March.
- Seoul, South Korea (Chungmu Arts Hall) 31 March; (Ewha Womans University) 2 and 3 April; Tokyo, Japan (Sumida Triphony Hall) 7 April and Yokohama, Japan (The Yokohama Blitz) 8 April.
- Nagoya, Japan (Aichi Arts Center Prefectural Arts Theater) 27 October; Yokohama, Japan (Yokohama Minato Mirai Hall) 28 October and Tokyo, Japan (Bunkyo Civic Center Entertainment Hall) 30 October.

2007

- Libera won an episode of the BBC talent show When Will I Be Famous? hosted by Graham Norton and broadcast on 17 February. They received £10,000 in prize money.
- Upper Norwood, United Kingdom (St John the Evangelist, Upper Norwood) 23 March.
- Angel Voices Tour – Osaka, Japan (The Symphony Hall) 11 April; Nagoya, Japan (Aichi Arts Center Prefectural Arts Theater) 12 April; Tokyo, Japan (Bunkamura Orchard Hall) 14 April (two shows); Suwon, South Korea (Gyeonggi Arts Center) 17 April and Seoul, South Korea (Sejong Center) 18 April.
- Arundel, West Sussex, United Kingdom (Arundel Cathedral) 5 May.
- Leiden, Netherlands (Pieterskerk, Leiden) 30 and 31 May. These concerts were later released as a DVD entitled Angel Voices.
- Harrogate, United Kingdom (St Wilfrid's Church, Harrogate) 30 June.
- Washington DC, United States Performed Brian Wilson's song Love and Mercy when he was an honoree at the Kennedy Center Honors 2 December. The performance was broadcast on 26 December.

2008

- Angel Voices US Tour – Buffalo, New York (Asbury Hall) 4 April; Hartford, Connecticut (The Bushnell Center for the Performing Arts) 6 April; Albany, New York (The Egg) 7 April; Pittsburgh, Pennsylvania (Byham Theater) 9 April; New York, New York (Riverside Church) 17 April.
- Performed in The Concert of Hope New York, New York (Yankee Stadium) 20 April where Pope Benedict XVI was in attendance.
- London, United Kingdom (Queen Elizabeth Hall) 11 May.
- Torquay, United Kingdom (St. John's Church) 30 July.
- Libera appeared on UK television with Aled Jones in a Christmas special where they performed new versions of carols. This was subsequently released on DVD.

2009

- BBC TV's Songs of Praise aired an entire programme dedicated to Libera on 25 January 2009.
- Angel Voice Tour 2009 – Sendai, Japan (Miyagi Hall) 6 April; Tokyo, Japan (Bunkamura Orchard Hall) 8 and 9 April; Palm Desert, California, United States (St. Margaret's Episcopal Church (Palm Desert, California)) 16 April and Garden Grove, California, United States (Crystal Cathedral) 19 April.
- Promo appearances on Japanese TV in Japan.
- Arundel, West Sussex, United Kingdom (Arundel Cathedral) 9 May.
- Dublin, Ireland (National Concert Hall) 31 July
- Belfast, United Kingdom (St Peter's Cathedral, Belfast) 3 August
- Edinburgh, United Kingdom (St Mary's Cathedral, Edinburgh (Roman Catholic)) 11 August
- The Philippine Tour – Manila, Philippines (Philippine International Convention Center Plenary Hall) 25 October and Cebu, Philippines (Waterfront Cebu City Hotel & Casino Grand Pacific Ballroom) 28 October.

2010

- Angel Voices Tour 2010 – Tokyo, Japan (Bunkamura Orchard Hall) 8 and 9 April; Seoul, South Korea (Sejong Center) 11 April Makati, Philippines (RCBC Plaza Carlos P. Romulo Auditorium) 16 April (two shows). Due to air travel disruption after the 2010 Eyjafjallajökull eruption, the group was forced to return to the UK from the Philippines via land and sea connections.
- Arundel, West Sussex, United Kingdom (Arundel Cathedral) 15 May.
- USA Summer Tour 2010 – Dallas, Texas (Preston Hollow Presbyterian Church) 1 August; Fort Worth, Texas (Arborlawn United Methodist Church) 2 August; St. Louis, Missouri (Cathedral Basilica of Saint Louis (St. Louis)) 5 August; Brentwood, Tennessee (Brentwood United Methodist Church) 8 August and Atlanta, Georgia (Peachtree Presbyterian Church) 10 August.
- UK Autumn Concert Tour 2010 – Bristol (Clifton Cathedral) 27 October; Chester (Chester Cathedral) 29 October; London (St George's Cathedral) 19 November and Beverley (Beverley Minster) 20 November.
- Appearance on BBC TV Songs of Praise performing "Eternal Light".
- Various UK TV appearances including "Christmas Cooks", "This Morning", and BBC "Breakfast".

2011

- Epsom, United Kingdom (Epsom Playhouse) 18 March.
- Libera Live in Canada – Toronto, Ontario (St. Michael's Cathedral Basilica (Toronto)) 14 April; London, Ontario (First-St Andrew's United Church) 15 April; Toronto, Ontario (Islington United Church) 17 April; Kitchener, Ontario (Centre in the Square) 18 April; Chatham, Ontario (St Paul's Congregational Church) 19 April; Hamilton, Ontario (West Highland Church) 22 April and Guelph, Ontario (Basilica of Our Lady Immaculate) 24 April.
- Libera Live – Minneapolis, Minnesota, United States (Basilica of Saint Mary (Minneapolis)) 27 July; St. Paul, Minnesota, United States (Cathedral of Saint Paul (Minnesota)) 29 July; Chicago, Illinois, United States (University of Chicago Roosevelt Chapel) 31 July; St. Louis, Missouri, United States (Cathedral Basilica of Saint Louis (St. Louis)) 3 August; Frisco, Texas, United States (Stonebriar Community Church) 7 August and Houston, Texas, United States (Tallowood Baptist Church) 9 August.
- Sang at Services at Moody Church Chicago, Illinois, United States 31 July
- Songs of Praise 50th Anniversary Concert at (Alexandra Palace) London, United Kingdom broadcast on 2 October.
- Manila, Philippines (Philippine International Convention Center Plenary Hall) 25 October.
- Cebu, Philippines (Waterfront Cebu City Hotel & Casino Grand Pacific Ballroom) 28 October.
- London, United Kingdom (St George's Cathedral) 25 November.
- Appearance on BBC TV's Songs of Praise performing "Still, Still, Still".
- UK TV appearances included "Live with Gabby" on Channel 5, and ITV's "This Morning".
- Christmas appearance on BBC Radio 2 on the "Chris Evans" show.

2012

- Appearance on BBC TV's Songs of Praise performing "How Shall I Sing That Majesty" (All Saints' Church, Cheltenham, United Kingdom).
- Spring Tour 2012 – Singapore (Esplanade Theatre) 6 and 7 April and Tokyo, Japan (Bunkamura Orchard Hall) 13 and 14 April.
- Arundel, West Sussex, United Kingdom (Arundel Cathedral) 5 May.
- Japanese TV promo filmed at All Saints Church, West Dulwich, London, United Kingdom.
- Channel Islands 2012 Tour – Saint Helier, Jersey (Jersey Opera House) 1 and 2 August and Saint Peter Port, Guernsey (St James, Guernsey) 7 and 8 August.
- Armagh, Northern Ireland, United Kingdom (St Patrick's Cathedral, Armagh) 1 November.
- Belfast, Northern Ireland, United Kingdom (St Peter's Cathedral, Belfast) 2 November
- London, United Kingdom (St George's Cathedral) 16 November.

2013

- Concerts in Taiwan – Taipei, Taiwan (National Theater and Concert Hall, Taipei) 2 and 3 April; Hsinchu, Taiwan (Hsinchu Performing Arts Center) 6 April; Kaohsiung, Taiwan Dadong Arts Center 7 April and Taichung, Taiwan (Taichung City Seaport Art Center) 9 April.
- Angel Voices – Bundang-gu, South Korea (St. John's Church, Seongnam) 12 April and Seoul, South Korea (Sejong Center) 13 April.
- Guildford, United Kingdom (Guildford Cathedral) 11 May.
- Armagh, Northern Ireland, United Kingdom (St Patrick's Cathedral, Armagh) 8 and 9 August.
- Christmas With Libera – Manila, Philippines (Philippine International Convention Center Plenary Hall) 29 October and Cebu City, Philippines (Chapel of San Pedro Calungsod) 31 October.
- London, United Kingdom (St George's Cathedral) 28 November.
- Appearance on The Tonight Show with Jay Leno – Burbank, California, United States (The Burbank Studios) broadcast on 19 December.
- Appearance on Today (American TV program) – New York City (NBC Studios (New York City)) broadcast on 25 December.

2014

- Spring Concerts | USA: – New York, New York (Church of the Incarnation, Episcopal (Manhattan)) 15 April and Morristown, New Jersey (Mayo Performing Arts Center) 16 April.
- Arundel, West Sussex, United Kingdom (Arundel Cathedral) 10 May.
- Live in the United States – Washington, D.C. (Basilica of the National Shrine of the Immaculate Conception) 6 and 7 August.
- Upper Norwood, United Kingdom (St John the Evangelist, Upper Norwood) 20 December.

2015

- Moscow, Russia (Moscow International Performing Arts Center Svetlanov Hall) 18 January.
- Live in the United States – Boston, Massachusetts (Wilbur Theatre) 1 April; San Antonio, Texas (Tobin Center for the Performing Arts) 4 April; St. Charles, Illinois (Arcada Theatre) 8 April and Atlanta, Georgia (Woodruff Arts Center) 10 April.
- Guildford, United Kingdom (Guildford Cathedral) 16 May.
- Exeter, United Kingdom (Exeter Cathedral) 27 July.
- Christchurch, United Kingdom (Christchurch Priory) 28 July.
- Osaka, Japan (Universal Studios Japan) 5 August.
- London, United Kingdom (St George's Cathedral) 11 December.
- Christmas Tour 2015 – Osaka, Japan (Grand Cube Osaka) 21 December and Tokyo, Japan (Tokyo Opera City Tower Concert Hall) 23 December (two shows).

2016

- Angels Sing – Manila, Philippines (Philippine International Convention Center Plenary Hall) 16 February and Cebu City, Philippines (SM Seaside City Cebu Center Stage) 18 February.
- Angel Voices Libera – Suwon, South Korea (Gyeonggi Arts Center) 29 March; Seoul, South Korea (Seoul Arts Center) 31 March; Icheon, South Korea (Icheon Art Hall) 1 April and Daejeon, South Korea (Daejon Culture & Arts Center) 3 April.
- Romsey, United Kingdom (Romsey Abbey) 23 April.
- Libera Live – Kraków, Poland (St. Kazimierz Królewicz Church) 26 July and (Main Square, Kraków) 27 July and Vallendar, Germany (Schoenstatt Pilgrims' Church) 2 August.
- Performed in Koncert Credo in Misericordiam Dei Brzegi, Wieliczka County, Poland (Campus Misericordiae) 30 July as part of World Youth Day 2016.
- London, United Kingdom (St George's Cathedral) 2 December.

2017

- Ely, United Kingdom (Ely Cathedral) 29 April.
- Angel Voices Tour 2017 "Hope" – Tokyo, Japan (Bunkamura Orchard Hall) 29 and 30 May; Osaka, Japan (Grand Cube Osaka) 2 June.
- Libera USA Tour 2017 – Garden Grove, California (Christ Cathedral (Garden Grove, California) Arboretum) 28 July; Westlake Village, California (Calvary Community Church) 30 July; Houston, Texas (Tallowood Baptist Church) 3 August; Tulsa, Oklahoma (Asbury United Methodist Church) 6 August; St. Louis, Missouri (Cathedral Basilica of Saint Louis (St. Louis)) 9 August
- 2017 Chinese Tour – Shanghai (Wuxi Grand Theatre) 24 October; (Shanghai Jinshan District Culture Museum) 25 October; (Shanghai Chongming District Theatre) 26 October; (Shanghai Symphony Hall) 27 October; (Shanghai Oriental Art Center) 28 October.
- London, United Kingdom (Westminster Cathedral) 1 December.

2018

- Ely, United Kingdom (Ely Cathedral) 12 May.
- 2018 Summer Concert Tour of the United States – San Antonio, Texas (Tobin Center for the Performing Arts) 24 July; Plano, Texas (St. Andrew United Methodist Church) 29 July; San Francisco, California (Saint Ignatius Church (San Francisco)) 31 July; Los Angeles, California (Cathedral of Our Lady of the Angels (Los Angeles)) 3 August and Garden Grove, California (Christ Cathedral (Garden Grove, California) Arboretum) 7 August.
- London, United Kingdom (Westminster Cathedral) 17 October.
- Angel Voices Tour 2018 "Beyond" – Tokyo, Japan (Shinjuku Culture Center) 22 and 23 October; Nagoya, Japan (Zepp) 24 October and Osaka, Japan (Grand Cube Osaka) 26 October.
- Brighton, United Kingdom (St Bartholomew's Church, Brighton) 15 December.
- Moscow, Russia (Zaryadye Hall) 28 December.

2019

- The Friendship Tour – Manila, Philippines (Meralco Theater) 19 February and Cebu, Philippines (Waterfront Cebu City Hotel & Casino Grand Pacific Ballroom) 23 February.
- Arundel, West Sussex, United Kingdom (Arundel Cathedral) 22 June.
- 2019 US Tour – St. Paul, Minnesota (Cathedral of Saint Paul (Minnesota)) 26 July; St. Louis, Missouri (Cathedral Basilica of Saint Louis (St. Louis)) 29 July; Oklahoma City, Oklahoma (First Southern Baptist Church) 1 August; Westlake Village, California (Calvary Community Church) 4 August and Garden Grove, California (Christ Cathedral (Garden Grove, California) Arboretum) 6 August.
- Angel Voices Tour 2019 – Tokyo, Japan (Bunkamura Orchard Hall) 21 and 22 October and Osaka, Japan (Grand Cube Osaka) 25 October.
- Christmas with Libera – London, United Kingdom (St John's, Smith Square) 3 December.

2020

- Online Mini Concert – online (Youtube Premier) 6 June 2020.
- Libera in London – London, United Kingdom (St John's, Smith Square) 6 December 2020.

2021

- Libera in London 2021 – London, United Kingdom (St John's, Smith Square) 5 December 2021.

2022

- Libera at Ely Cathedral – 21 May 2022.
- Libera in Brighton – Brighton, United Kingdom (St Bartholomew's Church) 29 July 2022.
- Libera at Chichester Cathedral – 30 July 2022.
- Libera in London 2022 – London, United Kingdom (St John's – Smith Square) 4 December 2022.

2023

- 2023 Korea (Forever) Tour – Seoul (Seoul Arts Centre) 5 April; Seoul (Sarang Underground Church) 6 April; Iksan (Iksan Arts Centre) 8 April; Incheon (Incheon Art Centre) 9 April and Sejong (Sejong Art Centre) 11 April.
- Libera at the Hibiya Music Festival – Tokyo, Japan (Hibiya Yaon) 3 June.
- 2023 US Tour – Washington, DC (Basilica of the National Shrine of the Immaculate Conception) 25 July; New York City, New York (The Riverside Church) 28 July; San Francisco, California (Grace Cathedral) 31 July and Los Angeles, California (Bel Air Church) 3 August.
- 2023 Japan (KIZUNA Forever) Tour – Osaka (Osaka Festival Hall) 24 October; Yokohama (KT Zepp Yokohama) 26 October and Tokyo (Line Cube Shibuya) 27 October.
- Libera at St John's – Smith Square – London, United Kingdom 2 December 2023
- Libera at Arundel Cathedral – Arundel, United Kingdom, 16 December 2023.

2024

- Libera UK Summer Tour – Ely (Ely Cathedral) 8 June; Chester (Chester Cathedral) 27 July and Lincoln (Lincoln Cathedral) 30 July.
- Angel Voices Tour 2024 – Tokyo, Japan (Line Cube Shibuya) 29 October; Tokyo, Japan (Line Cube Shibuya) 30 October and Osaka, Japan (Osaka Grand Cube) 1 November.
- Libera in London 2024 – London, United Kingdom (Smith Square Hall) 1 December 2024.

2025

- Libera at Southwark Cathedral – London, United Kingdom 10 May 2025.
- 2025 European Tour – Cobh, Ireland (St Colman's Cathedral) 25 July; Kilkenny, Ireland (St Canice's Cathedral) 26 July; Dublin, Ireland (The Lark) 31 July and Montserrat, Catalonia (Santa Maria de Montserrat Abbey) 2 August.
- Libera Back at Last! Tour 2025 – Manila, Philippines (Aliw Theatre) 28 October; Jakarta, Indonesia Arena JIEXPO 1 November (16:00) and 1 November (19:30).
- Libera in London 2025 – London, United Kingdom (Smith Square Hall) 29 December 2025.
- Libera in London 2025 – London, United Kingdom (Smith Square Hall) 30 December 2025.
- Libera in Malta – Mosta, Malta (Mosta Rotunda) 20 December and 21 December.

2026

- Angel Voices Tour 2026 – Tokyo, Japan (Line Cube Shibuya) 29 October (13:00) and 29 October (18:30) ;Tokyo, Japan (Line Cube Shibuya) 30 October; Osaka, Japan (Orix Theatre) 2 April and Kobe, Japan (Kobe International Kokusai Hall) 3 April.
