= Totally Saturday =

- Genre: Entertainment
- Presented by: Graham Norton
- Starring: Stuart Hall
- Country of origin: United Kingdom
- Original language: English
- No. of series: 1
- No. of episodes: 7

Production
- Executive producer: Sam Donnelly
- Producer: Clodagh O'Donoghue
- Production location: BBC TVC
- Running time: 59 mins
- Production company: BBC Vision

Original release
- Network: BBC One; BBC HD
- Release: 6 June – 18 July 2009

Totally Saturday is an entertainment and audience participation programme aired by the BBC in the United Kingdom. It premiered on BBC One on 6 June 2009 and ran for seven weeks.

== Production ==
The seven-part series, produced by BBC Vision, Unlike Noel's House Party the show been broadcast for 7 weeks and was commissioned by BBC One Controller Jay Hunt and Controller of Entertainment Commissioning Mark Linsey. A pilot for the show was created months beforehand.

== Content ==
The show turns the tables on members of the audience, by assuming control of their possessions, and putting them centre stage along with celebrities. During the live show, viewers could join in from their homes. One game was called the "Hamster Run", which viewers played with Norton via telephone. Participants had the chance to win a holiday.

== Cancellation ==
On 6 July 2009, it was announced that the BBC had decided to axe the show after just one series, due to poor ratings.

== Episodes ==
No.	Celebrities/Performers	Original release date
1	Lionel Richie, Boyzone and Perry Fenwick	6 June 2009
2	Pixie Lott and Roger Moore	13 June 2009
3	The Pet Shop Boys and The Jonas Brothers	20 June 2009
4	Freemasons featuring Sophie Ellis-Bextor and Kelly Clarkson	27 June 2009
5	The Saturdays and Ricky Hatton	4 July 2009
6	The Script	11 July 2009
7	The Noisettes, Jason Donovan and John Altman	18 July 2009
