= Peace (Libera album) =

Studio album by Libera
- Released: 8 March 2010
- Genre: Classical, choral, new-age
- Length: 48:42
- Label: EMI Classics
- Producer: Ian Tilley, Robert Prizeman

Libera chronology
Eternal - The Best of Libera (2008)	Peace (2010)	Libera: The Christmas Album (2011)

Peace is a studio album by London-based boy choir Libera, which was released in March 2010 by record label EMI Classics.

== Reception ==
The album peaked at No. 8 on the Billboard classical albums chart and remained on the charts for 12 weeks.

The album was reviewed by BBC Music's Daniel Ross, who criticised it for being too commercial and musically unchallenging.

== Track listing ==
Main CD
No.	Title	Length
1.	"Sanctissima" (Solo by Benedict Philipp)	4:22
2.	"Time" (Solo by Joshua Madine and Benedict Philipp Violin Solo by Fiona Pears)	4:17
3.	"Ave Virgo (Based on a theme from Mozart's Clarinet Concerto)" (Solo by Tom Cully)	3:52
4.	"Faithful Heart" (Solo by Joshua Madine Duett: Stefan Leadbeater and Daniel Fontannaz)	3:22
5.	"Gaelic Blessing (Deep Peace)" (Solo by Stefan Leadbeater and James Threadgill with Samuel Moriarty)	3:31
6.	"Exsultate" (Solo by Benedict Philipp)	3:45
7.	"How Shall I Sing That Majesty?" (Solo by Stefan Leadbeater)	4:08
8.	"Lacrymosa (based on Aquarium from Carnival of The Animals by Saint-Saëns)" (Solo by Benedict Philipp)	3:34
9.	"Adoro Te"	3:51
10.	"Lead Kindly Light" (Solo by Jakob De Menezes-Wood)	3:55
11.	"Panis Angelicus" (Solo by Daniel Fontannaz)	3:14
12.	"Touch The Sky" (Solo by James Mordaunt Duett: Benedict Philipp and Jakob De Menezes-Wood)	3:13
13.	"The Fountain (Based on Prelude in C Minor by Chopin)" (Solo by Ralph Skan)	3:33
Total length:		48:42

== Credits ==
- Vocal Soloist: Benedict Philipp, Joshua Madine, Tom Cully, Stefan Leadbeater, James Threadgill, Jakob De Menezes-Wood, Daniel Fontannaz, James Mordaunt, Ralph Skan
- Duets: Stefan Leadbeater - Daniel Fontannaz, Benedict Philipp - Jakob De Menezes-Wood
- Directed and conducted by Robert Prizeman
- Produced by Ian Tilley, Robert Prizeman and Sam Coates
- Assisted by Steven Geraghty, Ben Crawley and Tom Cully
- Musicians: Robert Prizeman, Ian Tilley, Steven Geraghty, Fiona Pears, Jonathan Howell

== Peace DeLuxe Edition ==
Peace DeLuxe Edition

Studio album by Libera
- Released: 22 November 2010 (EU and Japan) / 7 December 2010 (US)
- Genre: Classical, Choral, New-age
- Length: 1:01:35
- Label: EMI Classics
- Producer: Ian Tilley, Robert Prizeman

- Release Date: 22 November 2010 (EU and Japan) / 7 December 2010 (US)
- Vocal Soloist: Benedict Philipp, Joshua Madine, Tom Cully, Stefan Leadbeater, James Threadgill, Jakob De Menezes-Wood, Daniel Fontannaz, James Mordaunt, Ralph Skan
- Duets: Stefan Leadbeater - Daniel Fontannaz, Benedict Philipp - Jakob De Menezes-Wood
- Directed and conducted by Robert Prizeman
- Produced by Ian Tilley, Robert Prizeman and Sam Coates
- Assisted by Steven Geraghty, Ben Crawley and Tom Cully
- Musicians: Robert Prizeman, Ian Tilley, Steven Geraghty, Fiona Pears, Jonathan Howell

Limited Edition Deluxe Package features:

- 1) Album "Peace" (2010) with 5 bonus tracks (total 18 tracks)
  - Lullabye (Goodnight my Angel) (Solo: Joshua Madine)
  - Eternal Light (Solos: Stefan Leadbeater, Ralph Skan)
  - Going Home (Solos: Joshua Madine, Ben Philipp, Tom Cully)
  - Have yourself a merry little Christmas (Solos: James Mordaunt, Ralph Skan)
  - Silent Night (Solo: Tom Cully)
- 2) DVD with 7 Libera videos
  - Lullabye (Goodnight my Angel)
  - Time
  - Gaelic Blessing (Deep Peace)
  - Going Home
  - Libera
- Plus exclusive
  - Introducing Libera
  - Behind the scenes featurette
- 3) 18 month desktop calendar (Jan 2011 - Jun 2012) with photos and lyrics, and desktop stand
- 4) Fold-out Libera poster
