= Maria McErlane =

British actress and comedian (born 1957)

- Born: 9 December 1957 (age 68); Buckinghamshire, England
- Occupations: Television presenter, actress, director

Maria McErlane (born 9 December 1957) is a British actress and presenter specialising in comedy. She has been acting since 1984. She has appeared in several TV series, including The Fast Show, Gimme Gimme Gimme, Thin Ice and Happiness, "straight" roles in The Bill and Holby City and as the narrator for Antoine de Caunes and Jean-Paul Gaultier's Eurotrash.

== Career ==
Starting on the comedy circuit in the 1990s, under the name 'Maria Callous', McErlane has also guested on shows such as Have I Got News for You, If I Ruled the World and Just a Minute on Radio 4. She also is part of the murder panel show Foul Play, alongside Lee Simpson.

In June 1984 she appeared in the revue Out of Order at the Finborough Theatre.

McErlane co-presented the ITV quiz show Carnal Knowledge with her friend Graham Norton in the mid-1990s. She co-presented the "Grill Graham" agony aunt feature with Norton on his BBC Radio 2 Saturday morning show throughout its run and, on his departure for Virgin Radio in January 2021, joined him as co-presenter for his weekend shows. Whilst on Radio 2, she also stood in when he was ill in 2013 and when he failed to turn up on 28 June 2014. Since 2025 she has co-hosted the podcast Wanging On with Graham Norton and Maria McErlane.

McErlane is a friend of Nigella Lawson and has appeared on 16 episodes of Lawson's ITV chat show Nigella.

She has had regular columns in The Sunday Times and Esquire magazine.

== Personal life ==
McErlane says she is a lapsed Catholic. She divides her time between Hastings and a London mews house.

== Filmography ==
=== Television series ===
- Press Gang (1989–1990) as Maria, a waitress
- Comedy Playhouse (1993) as Helen
- Sean's Show (1993) as Teresa
- This Life (1996) as Mrs Janet Webb
- Jack and Jeremy's Real Lives (1996) as Twix Lady
- Paul Merton in Galton & Simpson's (1997) as Jill
- Gimme Gimme Gimme (1999) as Maureen
- Bostock's Cup (1999) as Margaret Masson
- Fat Friends (2000) as Brenda Falkinham
- The Fast Show (1997 and 2000) Various roles
- The Bill (2002) as Mrs. Walters
- Happiness (2001–2003) as Shirley
- Holby City (2004) as Martine Holbeck
- Thin Ice (2006) as Nikki Sumner
- Killing Eve (2020) as Diane

=== Films ===
- Children of Men (2006) as Shirley
- It2i2 (2006) as Maria Leghorn
