= Thin Ice (2006 TV series) =

- Created by: Simon Carlyle; Gregor Sharp
- Starring: Deborah Findlay; Marian McLoughlin; Marc Wootton; Nina Wadia; Maria McErlane; Janice Connolly; Lucy Baldwin]] Shannon Waring
- Country of origin: United Kingdom
- No. of series: 1
- No. of episodes: 6

Production
- Running time: 30 minutes

Original release
- Network: BBC Two
- Release: 28 February – 4 April 2006

Thin Ice is a British comedy television show on BBC Two starring Ian Ashpitel, Marc Wootton and Nina Wadia. All the episodes were written by Simon Carlyle and Gregor Sharp. It began on 28 February 2006 and ran for six 30 minute episodes until 4 April 2006. It is based around an ice rink in Derby, revolving around the intense rivalry which exists between an amateur ice-skating trainer and her nemesis. The programme was filmed, however, at Whitley Bay Ice Rink, and around the town of Whitley Bay in North Tyneside, which are mentioned as to where the British Championships would be held in the series. The programme ran for one series, but was not renewed by the BBC.
