= Carnal Knowledge (game show) =

- Genre: Game show
- Presented by: Maria McErlane
- Starring: Robert Llewellyn (pilot); Graham Norton (series)
- Theme music composer: Simon Bass; Peter Stuart
- Country of origin: United Kingdom
- Original language: English
- No. of series: 1
- No. of episodes: 27

Production
- Running time: 60 minutes (inc. adverts), 28 minutes (without adverts)
- Production companies: Rapido TV and Granada

Original release
- Network: Channel 4 (pilot); ITV (series)
- Release: 15 February – 1 August 1996

Carnal Knowledge is a short-lived British television game show relating to sex. It was shown very late at night, in accordance with its explicit subject matter. It was one of only a handful of shows to transfer from Channel 4 (where the pilot edition was shown as part of a sex-themed weekend) to ITV.

== Gameplay ==
Each edition featured two different couples being asked personal questions by Maria McErlane about their sex lives. Graham Norton acted as the assistant. One of his roles was keeping the scores.
