= The One and Only (British TV series) =

- Genre: Reality
- Presented by: Graham Norton
- Country of origin: United Kingdom
- No. of series: 1
- No. of episodes: 6

Original release
- Network: BBC One
- Release: 5 January – 16 February 2008

The One and Only is an entertainment talent contest made by the BBC. It was broadcast on BBC One and hosted by Graham Norton. The aim of the show is to find a musical tribute act to perform in a three-month stint in Las Vegas. Each week throughout January and February 2008 one of their number was lost after a public vote, and the other acts then chose who should go through based on their second performance. The Judges were David Grant and Carrie Grant. The show was won on 16 February 2008 by Katy Setterfield as Dusty Springfield.

== Concept ==
The top twelve contestants were emulating one famous musician, both past and present. These musicians are Britney Spears, Cher, Diana Ross, Dusty Springfield, Elton John, Frank Sinatra, Kylie Minogue, Lionel Richie, Madonna, Robbie Williams, Rod Stewart, and Tom Jones. Each week the contestants performed a song by their idols, after which the public voted. The two contestants with the fewest votes then had to sing again in front of a panel of the safe contestants. These contestants then voted to save one of the bottom two performers, and the contestant with the least support from their fellow contestants was eliminated.

== Contestants ==
The top twelve contestants were chosen from thousands of potential contestants around the country to participate in a series of auditions, from which a top three for each tribute act was chosen. These final three contestants then went on to audition in front of a selection of "superfans" of their chosen tribute act, who chose the act who would go through to the final twelve. The final twelve contestants were:

- Contestant: Eliminated
Katy Setterfield (Dusty Springfield)	Winner
Anthony Adams (Frank Sinatra)	Week 6
Moni Tivony (Lionel Richie)	Week 6
Joanna Berns (Cher)	Week 6
Tony Lewis (Robbie Williams)	Week 6
Siam Hurlock (Diana Ross)	Week 5
Simon Abbotts (Tom Jones)	Week 5
Ed Hintze (Elton John)	Week 4
Victoria Jones (Kylie Minogue)	Week 4
Tara Stafford-Allen (Britney Spears)	Week 3
Evelyne Brink (Madonna)	Week 2
Greg Dorell (Rod Stewart)	Week 1

=== Anthony Adams ===
Anthony was a 52-year-old delivery driver and Frank Sinatra tribute act from Poole, Dorset. Anthony had always wanted a career in music but had never had any major success in this field. Anthony once set up a Sinatra tribute band called "Simply Sinatra" and was persuaded to audition for the show by a customer of his. Anthony's favourite Sinatra song was "Three Coins in the Fountain". Anthony finished in second place, as announced on the Final Show.

=== Ed Hintze ===
Ed was a 34-year-old music teacher and Elton John impersonator from Weymouth. Ed performed his first solo gig at the age of twelve, which consisted of playing the keyboards at his local pub. After being inspired by another tribute act Ed began a tribute to Elton John in 1992. Ed lives with his wife and two children, and enjoys spending his free time cooking gourmet meals for her. Ed's favourite Elton John song is "Sorry Seems to be the Hardest Word". He was also the only performer on the show who played an instrument live as well as singing. Ed was Eliminated in Week Four after losing the student Vote against Cher.

=== Evelyne Brink ===
Evelyne, who originates from Frankfurt in Germany, was a 31-year-old Madonna lookalike and soundalike. She has lived all over the World before settling in London, including a period in the United States when Evelyne lived in the same New York City district that Madonna once lived in. Evelyne was always told that she looked like Madonna, but it wasn't until 2003 that she first performed as Madonna in Purley, Surrey. Evelyne worked in promotions and waitressing, as well as studying at the New York School of Music and Television. Evelyne was in the Bottom Two in Week One, and was Eliminated Week Two.

=== Greg Dorell ===
Greg was a 41-year-old Rod Stewart tribute act. Since leaving school Greg had worked as a butcher and in a hairdressing apprenticeship. Greg's talent was first spotted by an ex-girlfriend when she heard him singing along to a Rod Stewart track and asked him to give a performance at the London Palladium for a children's dance concert she was involved in. He gigged regularly in his local area and around the country, and said his favourite Rod Stewart songs are "Baby Jane" and "Forever Young". Greg was Eliminated Week One.

=== Joanna Berns ===
Joanna was a 35-year-old Cher impersonator from Hertfordshire. Joanna first put together her Cher tribute act in 1998, but had been singing since the age of four. Joanna made a living from performing as Cher and performs her tribute act each year on a Caribbean cruise ship and has performed as Cher in Dubai. Joanna came from a very musical family, and her current boyfriend Steve was also a singer, who sometimes performed with her. Joanna's favourite Cher song was "Love and Understanding". Joanna was in the Bottom Three in Weeks Four and Five, but was saved by the student Vote. Cher was Eliminated in the first show of the Final Week, and did not get the chance to perform in the second programme.

=== Katy Setterfield ===
Katy was a 37-year-old Dusty Springfield impersonator from High Wycombe. Katy had been a musician all her life, but when she was not singing she enjoys spending time with her horses, walking her dog and jogging. Katy had travelled all over the World in a stage act which paid tribute to the music of Dusty Springfield, as well as Cher and Tina Turner. Katy had the ability to contort her voice to fit the sound of various musical superstars, but said that her favourite was Dusty. Katy was announced as the Winner of The One and Only on the final show. Katy went on to perform in various parts of the world as a lead act in her one-woman show ultimately meeting her husband Lucas Finney sometimes she can be found performing with him. They have one child, Julian, born in 2014. Katy continues to perform with Legends in Concert and as a guest artist in many parts of the world.

www.katysetterfield.com

=== Moni Tivoni ===
Moni, a 27-year-old supermarket worker and Lionel Richie tribute act had been singing and performing since he was a small child. Moni's mother was a huge Motown fan and he immersed himself in the music. Despite never having performed as Lionel Richie on stage Moni performed part-time in a soul vocal group. Moni's favourite Lionel songs were "Penny Lover", "Say You, Say Me" and "All Night Long (All Night)". Moni went on to finish in Third Place on the final night. Moni later went on and auditioned for The Voice UK in 2013 and made it to the knockout rounds.

=== Siam Hurlock ===
Siam was a 39-year-old Diana Ross tribute act from London. Singing and performing had always been Siam's dream, and as a child became obsessed with Motown performers, dreaming that one day she could be like Diana Ross. As a child Siam was too nervous to performs in front of an audience, even running off of the stage at the Hackney Empire once as nerves got the better of her. Before The One and Only Siam worked as a hairdresser in London, but had also worked in the West End, once playing Diana Ross in the musical "Dancing in the Streets". Siam crafted her own costumes that accompany her on stage and said that her favourite Diana Ross song was "Ain't No Mountain High Enough". Siam was in the Bottom Two in Week 2, and was Eliminated in Week 5 after losing the Public Vote against Cher.

=== Simon Abbotts ===
Simon was a 42-year-old Tom Jones tribute act. He first started performing as Tom Jones when he was 25 years old and had been performing regularly as him ever since. Simon once had a single chart in Germany with the band Pulse. Simon's greatest ambition was to perform in Las Vegas and to sing on television. His favourite Tom Jones song was "I'll Never Fall in Love Again". Simon was Eliminated in Week Five when he polled Bottom of the Public Vote.

=== Tara Stafford-Allen ===
Tara, a 29-year-old police officer from Lincolnshire, was a Britney Spears impersonator. Tara had only been performing as Britney for nine months, but had been singing since she was 12 years old. As a child an illness affecting Tara's immune system left her unable to pursue her love of acting and singing, and doctors feared she may lose her legs. Tara originally trained as a riding instructor, pursuing her other passion of horses, but later decided to re-train as a police officer. Tara lived next door to her parents in Lincolnshire and said that the only time she had ever been apart from them was when she briefly attended a boarding school. Tara's favourite Britney Spears track was "I Love Rock N Roll". Tara was Eliminated in Week Three.

=== Tony Lewis ===
Tony, was a 27-year-old former plumber and air conditioning engineer from Lancashire. In his spare time he worked as a Robbie Williams tribute act. Tony first started working as a tribute act when he entered a karaoke competition and won. Tony had been following Robbie's concert tours since 1996 and had been a successful Robbie Williams Tribute Act for more than five years. Tony's favourite Robbie Williams song was "Let Me Entertain You". Robbie was Eliminated in the first show of the Final Week, and did not get the chance to perform in the second programme.

=== Victoria Jones ===
Victoria was a 25-year-old Kylie Minogue impersonator. Victoria had always been a Kylie fan; as a child her mother would curl her hair so she could look like her idol, and by the time she was fifteen years old she was performing Kylie track on stage in a cabaret act. Victoria's tribute act included a performance of "Better the Devil You Know" dressed in those famous hot-pants. Despite Victoria's obvious talent it was only when she was involved in a car accident the previous year that she truly decided to follow her dream. Victoria was highly competitive and determined to win the One and Only, and said her favourite Kylie record was "Better the Devil You Know". Victoria was in the Bottom Two in Week Three, and Eliminated Week Four.

== Live Show Details ==
=== Week One ===
Artist	Song (Original Artists)	Results
Anthony Adams (Frank Sinatra)	Strangers in the Night- Frank Sinatra	
Ed Hintze (Elton John)	I Guess That's Why They Call It The Blues - Elton John	
Evelyne Brink (Madonna)	Material Girl - Madonna	Bottom Two
Greg Dorell (Rod Stewart)	Do Ya Think I'm Sexy - Rod Stewart	Eliminated
Joanna Berns (Cher)	Strong Enough - Cher	
Katie Setterfield (Dusty Springfield)	I Only Wanna Be With You - Dusty Springfield	
Moni Tivony (Lionel Richie)	Easy - Lionel Richie	
Siam Hurlcok (Diana Ross)	I'm Coming Out - Diana Ross	
Simon Abbotts (Tom Jones)	What's New Pussycat - Tom Jones	
Tara Stafford-Allen (Britney Spears)	(You Drive Me) Crazy - Britney Spears	
Tony Lewis (Robbie Williams)	Feel - Robbie Williams	
Victoria Jones (Kylie Minogue)	I Should Be So Lucky - Kylie Minogue	

Madonna Tribute Act Evelyne Brink and Rod Stewart Tribute Act Greg Dorrell found themselves in the Bottom Two. After performing again Rod Stewart was Eliminated by the surviving performers with only 1 of 10 votes - choosing Madonna to stay.

=== Week Two ===
Artist	Song (Original Artists)	Results
Anthony Adams (Frank Sinatra)	That's Life - Frank Sinatra	
Ed Hintze (Elton John)	Rocket Man - Elton John	
Evelyne Brink (Madonna)	Papa Don't Preach - Madonna	Eliminated
Joanna Berns (Cher)	Believe - Cher	
Katie Setterfield (Dusty Springfield)	Wishing and Hoping - Dusty Springfield	
Moni Tivony (Lionel Richie)	All Night Long - Lionel Richie	
Siam Hurlcok (Diana Ross)	Chain Reaction - Diana Ross	Bottom Two
Simon Abbotts (Tom Jones)	Green, Green Grass of Home - Tom Jones	
Tara Stafford-Allen (Britney Spears)	...Baby One More Time - Britney Spears	
Tony Lewis (Robbie Williams)	Let Me Entertain You - Robbie Williams	
Victoria Jones (Kylie Minogue)	Spinning Around - Kylie Minogue	

Madonna Tribute Act Evelyne Brink and Diana Ross Tribute Act Siam Hurlock found themselves in the Bottom Two. After performing again Madonna was Eliminated by the surviving performers with 2 out of a possible 9 votes - choosing Diana Ross to stay.

=== Week Three ===
Artist	Song (Original Artists)	Results
Anthony Adams (Frank Sinatra)	New York, New York - Frank Sinatra	
Ed Hintze (Elton John)	Candle in the Wind - Elton John	
Joanna Berns (Cher)	If I Could Turn Back Time - Cher	
Katie Setterfield (Dusty Springfield)	"You Don't Have to Say You Love Me" - Dusty Springfield	
Moni Tivony (Lionel Richie)	Dancing on the Ceiling - Lionel Richie	
Siam Hurlcok (Diana Ross)	Touch Me in The Morning - Diana Ross	
Simon Abbotts (Tom Jones)	It's Not Unusual - Tom Jones	
Tara Stafford-Allen (Britney Spears)	Toxic - Britney Spears	Eliminated
Tony Lewis (Robbie Williams)	She's The One - Robbie Williams	
Victoria Jones (Kylie Minogue)	Can't Get You Out of My Head - Kylie Minogue	Bottom Two

Britney Spears Tribute Act Tara Stafford-Allen and Kylie Minogue Tribute Act Victoria Jones found themselves in the Bottom Two. After performing again Britney Spears was Eliminated by the surviving performers with 3 out of a possible 8 votes - choosing Kylie Minogue to stay.

=== Week Four ===
Artist	Song (Original Artists)	Results
Anthony Adams (Frank Sinatra)	I Get A Kick Out of You - Frank Sinatra	
Ed Hintze (Elton John)	I'm Still Standing - Elton John	Eliminated
Joanna Berns (Cher)	Walking in Memphis - Cher	Bottom Three
Katie Setterfield (Dusty Springfield)	Son of a Preacher Man - Dusty Springfield	
Moni Tivony (Lionel Richie)	Three Times A Lady - Lionel Richie	
Siam Hurlcok (Diana Ross)	"Stop! In the Name of Love" - Diana Ross	
Simon Abbotts (Tom Jones)	Delilah - Tom Jones	
Tony Lewis (Robbie Williams)	Angels - Robbie Williams	
Victoria Jones (Kylie Minogue)	Better The Devil You Know - Kylie Minogue	Eliminated

This Week the three acts with the fewest votes were revealed; Cher Tribute Act Joanna Berns, Elton John Tribute Act Ed Hintze and Kylie Minogue Tribute Act Victoria Jones. The act with the fewest votes (Kylie Minogue) was immediately Eliminated, leaving Cher and Elton John to face the Vote. After they performed again Elton John was Eliminated by the surviving performers with 2 out of a possible 6 votes - choosing Cher to stay.

=== Week Five ===
Artist	Song (Original Artists)	Results
Anthony Adams (Frank Sinatra)	My Way - Frank Sinatra	
Joanna Berns (Cher)	I Found Someone - Cher	Bottom Three
Katie Setterfield (Dusty Springfield)	"I Just Don't Know What to Do with Myself" - Dusty Springfield	
Moni Tivony (Lionel Richie)	Hello - Lionel Richie	
Siam Hurlcok (Diana Ross)	Aint No Mountain High Enough - Diana Ross	Eliminated
Simon Abbotts (Tom Jones)	Sex Bomb - Tom Jones	Eliminated
Tony Lewis (Robbie Williams)	Rock DJ - Robbie Williams	

This Week the three acts with the fewest votes were revealed; Cher Tribute Act Joanna Berns, Diana Tribute Act Siam Hurlock and Tom Jones Tribute Act Simon Abbots. The act with the fewest votes (Tom Jones) was immediately Eliminated, leaving Cher and Diana Ross to face the Vote. After they performed again Diana was Eliminated by the surviving performers with 1 out of a possible 4 votes - choosing Cher to stay.

=== Final Week Six ===
Artist	Song (Original Artists)	Results
Anthony Adams (Frank Sinatra)	Come Fly With Me - Frank Sinatra	Runner-Up
Anthony Adams (Frank Sinatra)	The Lady Is A Tramp - Frank Sinatra	Runner-Up
Joanna Berns (Cher)	Gypsies, Tramps and Thieves - Cher	Eliminated
Joanna Berns (Cher)	The Shoop Shoop Song - Cher	Eliminated
Katie Setterfield (Dusty Springfield)	In the Middle of Nowhere - Dusty Springfield	Winner
Katie Setterfield (Dusty Springfield)	All I See is You - Dusty Springfield	Winner
Moni Tivony (Lionel Richie)	My Destiny - Lionel Richie	Third Place
Moni Tivony (Lionel Richie)	Say You, Say Me - Lionel Richie	Third Place
Tony Lewis (Robbie Williams)	Supreme - Robbie Williams	Eliminated
Tony Lewis (Robbie Williams)	Millennium - Robbie Williams	Eliminated

In the first of two live shows, the two acts with the fewest votes were immediately Eliminated at the end of the show. These two acts were Robbie Williams tribute act Tony Lewis and Cher Tribute Act Joanna Berns. This left Dusty, Frank and Lionel in the final three for the second programme of the night.
In the second show of the night Dusty Springfield tribute act Katie Setterfield was announced as the winner of the contract to perform in Las Vegas, with Frank Sinatra tribute act Anthony Adams in second place and Lionel Richie tribute act Moni Tivony in third place.

== Elimination Table ==
	Week 1	Week 2	Week 3	Week 4	Week 5	FINAL Week 6		
	Week 1	Week 2	Week 3	Week 4	Week 5	Show One	Show Two	
Katy Setterfield (Dusty Springfield)	Madonna	Madonna	Kylie	Cher	Cher	Safe	Winner	
Anthony Adams (Frank Sinatra)	Madonna	Diana	Britney	Cher	Cher	Safe	Runner-Up	
Moni Tivony (Lionel Richie)	Madonna	Diana	Britney	Elton	Cher	Safe	Third Place (Week 6)	
Joanna Berns (Cher)	Madonna	Diana	Kylie	Bottom; Three	Bottom; Three	Bottom; Two	Eliminated (Week 6)	
Tony Lewis (Robbie Williams)	Madonna	Diana	Kylie	Cher	Diana	Bottom; Two	Eliminated (Week 6)	
Siam Hurlcok (Diana Ross)	Madonna	Bottom; Two	Kylie	Cher	Bottom; Three	Eliminated (Week 5)		
Simon Abbotts (Tom Jones)	Rod	Madonna	Britney	Elton	Bottom	Eliminated (Week 5)		
Ed Hintze (Elton John)	Madonna	Diana	Kylie	Bottom; Three	Eliminated (Week 4)			
Victoria Jones (Kylie Minogue)	Madonna	Diana	Bottom; Two	Bottom	Eliminated (Week 4)			
Tara Stafford-Allen (Britney Spears)	Madonna	Diana	Bottom; Two	Eliminated (Week 3)				
Evelyne Brink (Madonna)	Bottom; Two	Bottom; Two	Eliminated (Week 2)					
Greg Dorell (Rod Stewart)	Bottom; Two	Eliminated (Week 1)						
Bottom Two/Three	Madonna, Rod	Diana, Madonna	Britney, Kylie	Cher, Elton	Cher, Diana	Cher, Robbie	-	
Eliminated	Rod; Stewart; 1 of 10; Votes	Madonna; 2 of 9 Votes	Britney; Spears; 3 of 8 Votes	Kylie; Minogue; Bottom	Tom; Jones; Bottom	Robbie; Williams; Bottom Two	Lionel; Richie; Third Place	Frank; Sinatra; Runner-Up
Eliminated	Rod; Stewart; 1 of 10; Votes	Madonna; 2 of 9 Votes	Britney; Spears; 3 of 8 Votes	Elton; John; 2 of 6 Votes	Diana; Ross; 1 of 4 Votes	Cher; Bottom Two	Lionel; Richie; Third Place	Dusty; Springfield; Winner
