= Graham Norton =

Irish comedian, actor, and television host (born 1963)

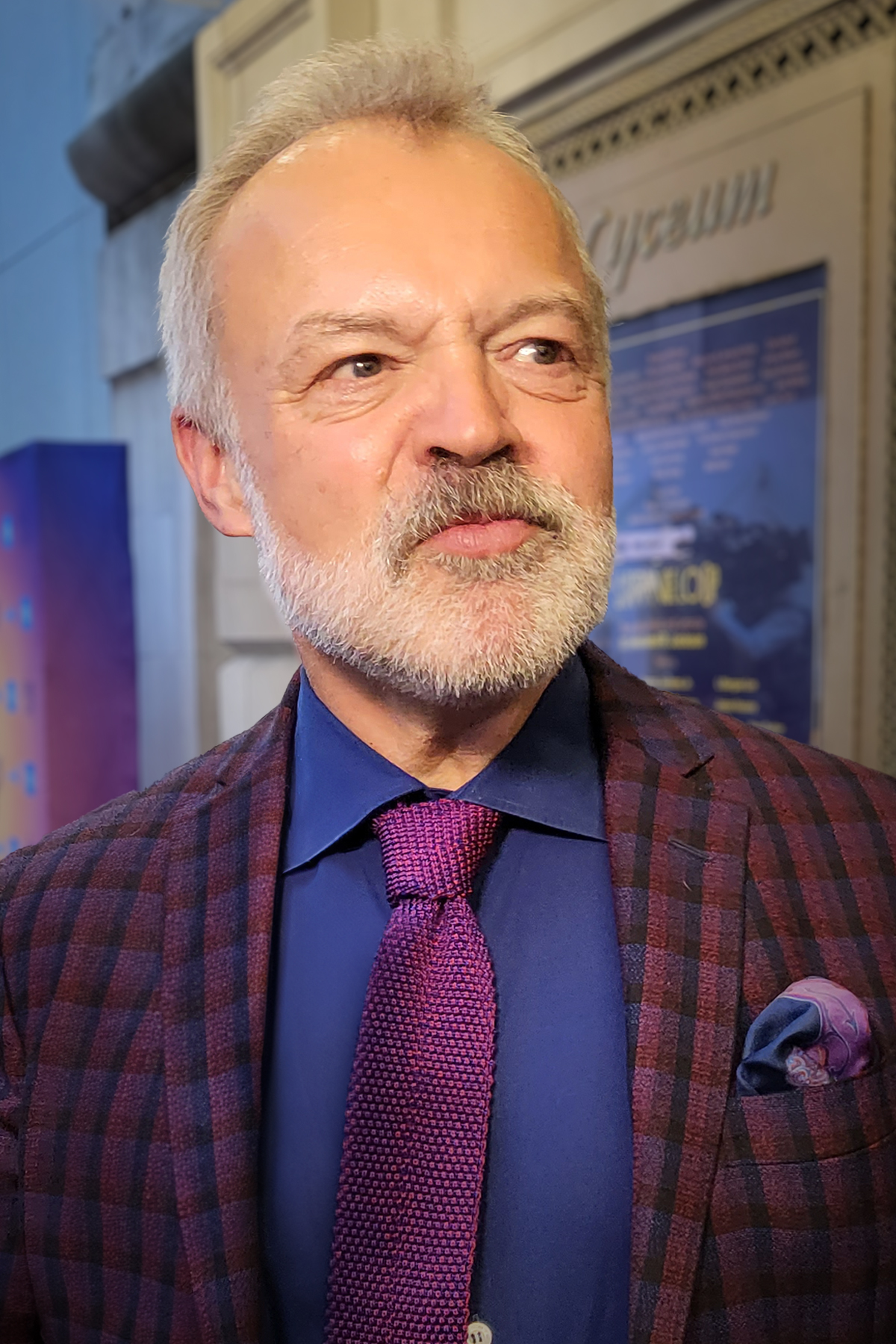
- Norton in 2022
- Born: Graham William Walker; 4 April 1963 (age 63); Clondalkin, County Dublin, Ireland
- Education: Royal Central School of Speech and Drama
- Occupations: Comedian; broadcaster; actor; writer
- Years active: 1981–present
- Spouse: Jono McLeod (m. 2022)

Signature
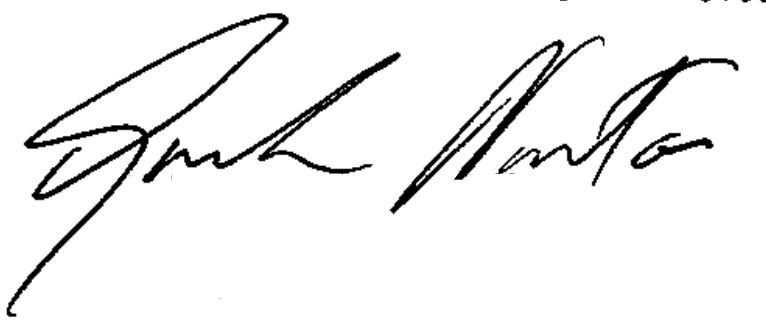

Graham William Walker (born 4 April 1963), known professionally as Graham Norton, is an Irish comedian, broadcaster, actor, and author. He is best known as a chat show host, having presented The Graham Norton Show since 2007. Norton has won the British Academy Television Award for Best Entertainment Performance a record six times and has an additional BAFTA win for producing. He has been noted for his innuendo-laden dialogue and flamboyant presentation style.

In addition to hosting his chat show, since 2009, Norton has served as the BBC's television commentator for the final of the Eurovision Song Contest, and co-hosted the final of the 2023 edition of the event. From 2010 to 2020, he presented the Saturday-morning slot on BBC Radio 2, and from 2021 to 2024, he presented a weekend show for Virgin Radio UK. In 2019, Norton became a judge on the reality competition series RuPaul's Drag Race UK.

In 2012, he sold his production company So Television to ITV for around £17 million.

== Early life and education ==
Norton was born Graham William Walker on 4 April 1963, at 48 St Brigid's Road, in Clondalkin, County Dublin, Ireland, to William "Billy" (died 2000), a sales representative for Guinness, and Rhoda Walker. He has an older sister, Paula (born 1959). Because of his father's job, he and his family moved around Ireland throughout his early childhood; they lived in Tramore, Waterford, and Kilkenny, before settling in the town of Bandon, County Cork, where he grew up. He was raised in a Church of Ireland family, and has said that he felt somewhat isolated growing up as a Protestant in the predominantly Catholic south of Ireland. His father's family were from County Wicklow, while his mother is a native of Belfast. He discovered during a 2007 episode of the genealogy series Who Do You Think You Are? that his father's direct ancestors were English, having originated in Yorkshire before emigrating to Ireland in 1713. Norton was educated at Bandon Grammar School in County Cork.

In 1981, Norton began studying English and French at University College Cork and was featured in an episode of Radio and Television of Ireland (RTÉ)'s Youngline, participating in an audience debate about underage teens attending discos.

In 1983, he had a nervous breakdown, refused to leave his flat, and stopped his studies. (He received an honorary doctorate from the university in 2013.) He travelled to San Francisco where he lived for a year in the "Stardance" hippie commune house on Fulton Street and worked as a waiter. In the late 1980s he moved to London to attend the Central School of Speech and Drama. He again found work as a waiter during that period. Upon joining the actors' union Equity, he chose Norton (his great-grandmother's maiden name) as his new surname, as there was already a comic-actor called Graham Walker (died 2013), represented by the union.

== Career ==
=== Channel 4 ===
In 1992, Norton's stand-up comedy drag act as a tea-towel-clad Mother Teresa of Calcutta in the Edinburgh Festival Fringe made the press when Scottish Television's religious affairs department mistakenly thought he represented the real Mother Teresa. His first appearances in broadcasting were in the UK, where he had a spot as a regular comedian and panellist on the BBC Radio 4 show Loose Ends in the early 1990s, when the show ran on Saturday mornings.

He was one of the early successes of Channel 5, winning an award as stand-in host of a late-night TV talk show usually presented by Jack Docherty. This was followed by a comic quiz show on Channel 5 called Bring Me the Head of Light Entertainment, which was not well received as a programme but enhanced Norton's reputation as a comic and host. In 1996, he co-hosted the late-night quiz show Carnal Knowledge on ITV with Maria McErlane.

Between 1996 and 1998, Norton played the part of Father Noel Furlong in three episodes ("Hell", "Flight into Terror", "The Mainland") of the Channel 4 series Father Ted, which was set on the fictional Craggy Island off the west coast of Ireland. Father Furlong was often seen taking charge of the St Luke's Youth Group.

After this early success, Norton moved to Channel 4 in 1998 to host his own chat shows, including the weekly So Graham Norton (1998–2002), followed by the daily weeknight show V Graham Norton (2002–03). In 2001 he hosted Comic Relief on BBC One.

In January 2003 Norton was listed in The Observer as one of the 1,000 funniest acts in British comedy. (Though Norton is Irish, the bulk of his television career has been in the UK.) In January 2004, he was named the most powerful person in TV comedy by Radio Times.

Also that year he was the subject of controversy in the United Kingdom when, on his Channel 4 show, he joked, "I bet Maurice Gibb's heart monitor was singing the tune of 'Stayin' Alive'", referring to the recent death of the Bee Gees singer. Gibb's brother Robin described Norton as "scum", threatened to "rip his head off" if he saw him, and demanded an apology from him, the show's producers, and Channel 4. After receiving complaints, the Independent Television Commission investigated and Channel 4 made two apologies: one in the form of a caption slide before the show, another from Norton in person.

In the midst of controversy surrounding the February 2004 Justin Timberlake and Janet Jackson's Super Bowl performance, Norton was wary of moving into the American television market, but The Graham Norton Effect debuted on 24 June 2004 on Comedy Central, and was also broadcast in the UK on BBC Three.

=== BBC ===
==== Television ====
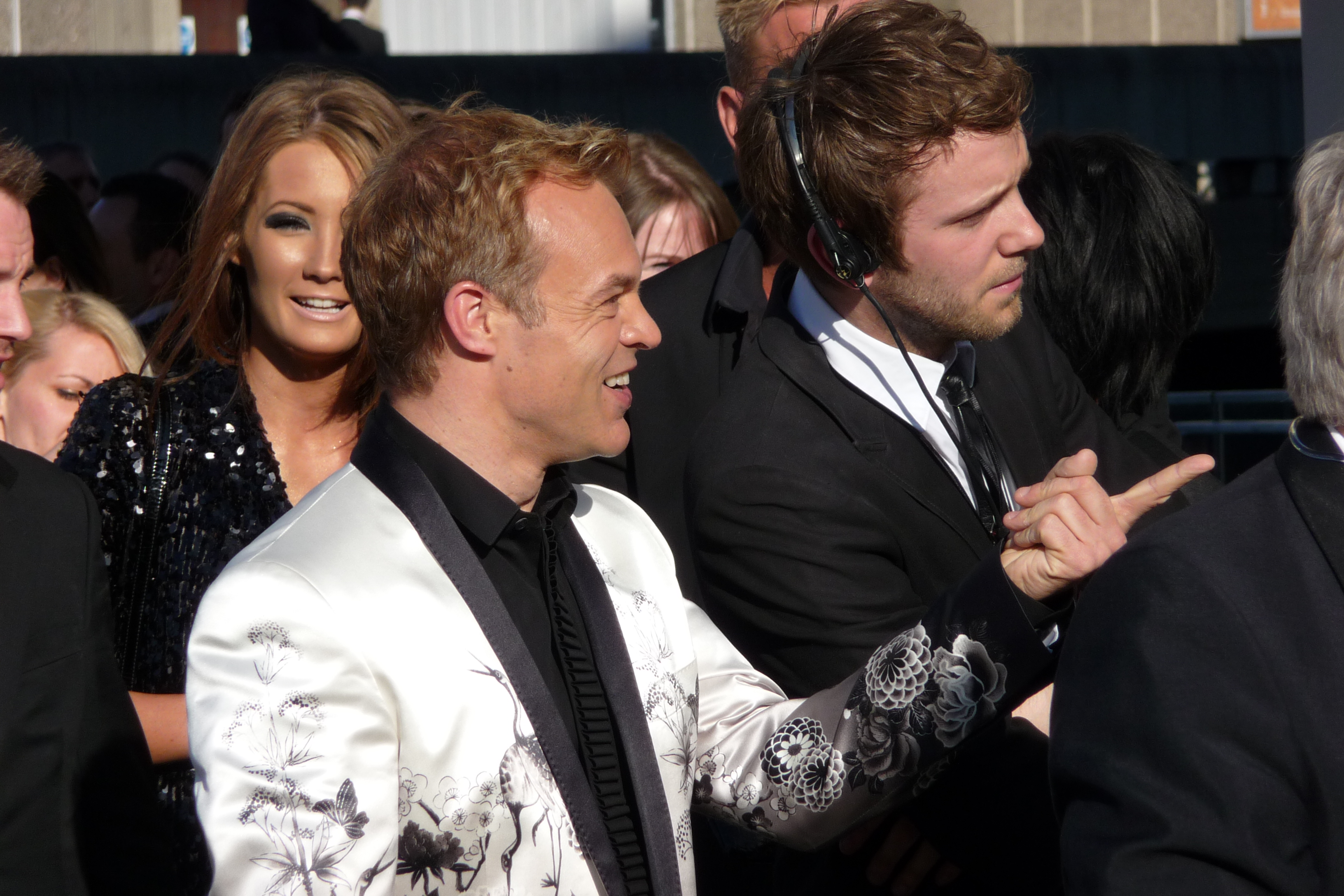
Norton at the 2009 BAFTA Awards

In 2005, Norton moved to the BBC and began hosting the Saturday evening reality TV series Strictly Dance Fever on BBC One, as well as a new comedy chat show, Graham Norton's Bigger Picture. He also read stories some nights on the BBC children's channel CBeebies as part of Bedtime Hour.

In 2006, Norton hosted the BBC One series How Do You Solve a Problem like Maria? in which Andrew Lloyd Webber tried to find a lead actress for his West End version of The Sound of Music. Norton presented the three follow-up series: in 2007, Any Dream Will Do, in which a group of men competed to win the role of Joseph in the West End production of Joseph and the Amazing Technicolor Dreamcoat; in 2008, I'd Do Anything, in which Lloyd Webber seeks to find actors for the parts of Nancy and Oliver for Sir Cameron Mackintosh's West End production of Lionel Bart's Oliver!; and in 2010, Over the Rainbow, to find a new Dorothy for a Wizard of Oz West End production.

Norton hosted various other shows for the BBC during this time, including When Will I Be Famous? (2007), The One and Only (2008) and Totally Saturday (2009). Since 2007, Norton has also been a regular host of The British Academy Television Awards. On 7 July 2007, Norton presented at Live Earth and undertook a trip to Ethiopia with the Born Free Foundation to highlight the plight of the Ethiopian wolf – the rarest canid in the world. In the same year, he was the subject of an episode of the BBC1 genealogy documentary Who Do You Think You Are?

Norton's chat show, The Graham Norton Show, began on 22 February 2007, on BBC Two. The format is very similar to his previous Channel 4 shows. On 6 October 2009, the show moved to BBC One, in a new one-hour format.

In May 2010, Norton stood in for Chris Evans' breakfast show on BBC Radio 2. Later that month, it was confirmed that he would be replacing Jonathan Ross's Saturday morning slot on the same station.

In December 2011, the panel show Would You Rather...? with Graham Norton premiered on BBC America in the time slot immediately following The Graham Norton Show. Recorded in New York, it is one of BBC America's earliest efforts at producing original programming, and is also the first panel game the channel has shown, either of British or American origin.

In October 2018, talking to BBC News about his reported 2017–18 BBC salary, Norton said that he genuinely "doesn't know" how the corporation arrived at that figure. "Myself and my agent look at that number and we go 'I wonder how they came up with that'," he says. "It bears no relation to anything I know. But if that's what they say I earn, that's what I earn."

In February 2019, it was announced that Norton would be a judge on RuPaul's Drag Race UK alongside Alan Carr in a rotating basis. Norton and Carr were joined by permanent judges Michelle Visage and RuPaul.

==== Radio ====
Since 1999, Norton has appeared regularly on the BBC Radio 4 panel show Just a Minute, appearing in over 100 episodes.

On 2 October 2010, Norton began presenting a Saturday morning show on BBC Radio 2, which he took over from Jonathan Ross. Norton co-hosted with Maria McErlane who featured as an "agony aunt" on the segment "Grill Graham". "Tune with a Tale" is where a listener suggests playing a song with a plot, summarising the story it contains, and "I Can't Believe It's Not Better" is a feature where a listener requests a song that was previously a hit, but might be considered particularly bad now. Unlike Steve Wright in the Afternoon aired from 14:00 to 17:00 on weekdays, it is well established as being a "brand",with its end of each hour style of presentations, although Norton regularly uses the standard BBC Radio 2 jingles along with jingles unique to the Saturday morning show, written and performed by the BBC Radio 2 Orchestra.

In January 2012, Norton asked listeners to his Radio 2 show to help find his car, shortly after it was stolen. He called it "The Great Car Hunt" and told listeners to "Keep your eyes out for it. It was filthy by the way."

On 11 November 2020, Norton announced that he would step down from the show, and hosted his final Saturday morning show on 19 December 2020, after 10 years. He was replaced by Claudia Winkleman from February 2021.

Norton joined Virgin Radio UK in January 2021, hosting shows on Saturday and Sunday. In February 2024, Norton announced that "he wanted his weekends back" and would step away from hosting his weekend radio show for the station.

==== Eurovision Song Contest ====
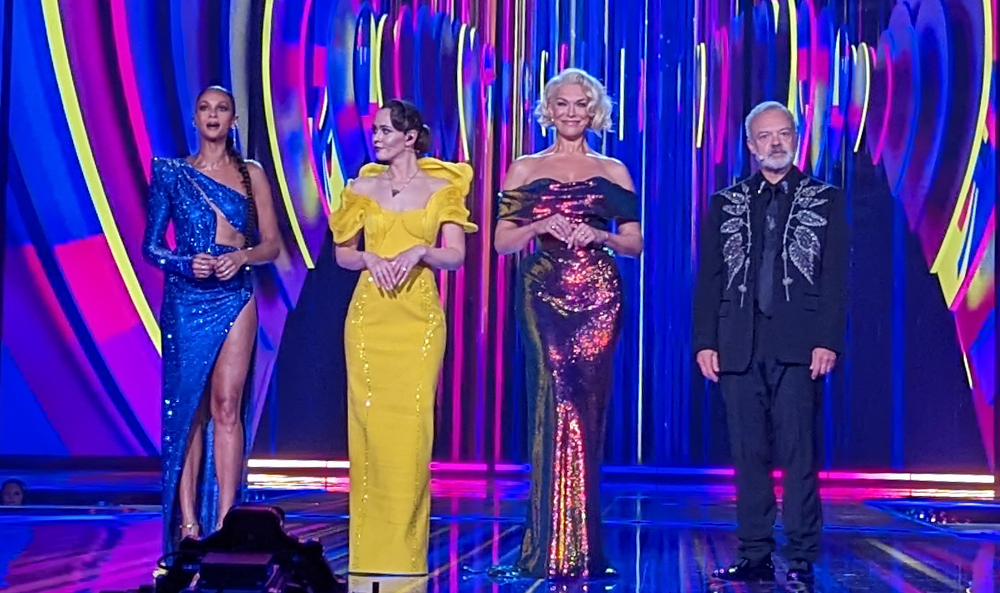
Norton co-hosted the final of the Eurovision Song Contest 2023 in Liverpool alongside Alesha Dixon, Julia Sanina and Hannah Waddingham.

Norton, along with Claudia Winkleman, hosted the first annual Eurovision Dance Contest, which was held on 1 September 2007, in London, England. The format was based on the BBC's Strictly Come Dancing and the EBU's Eurovision Song Contest. Norton and Winkleman also hosted the 2008 contest in Glasgow, Scotland.

In October 2008, it was confirmed by the BBC that Norton would replace Terry Wogan as the presenter of the UK national selection of the Eurovision Song Contest, Your Country Needs You.

On 5 December 2008, it was announced that Norton would also take over from Wogan as the British commentator for the main Eurovision Song Contest. The 54th Eurovision Song Contest was held in the Olympic Arena, Moscow on 16 May 2009.

In January 2009, Norton hosted Eurovision: Your Country Needs You, a talent show to find who would represent the United Kingdom in the Eurovision Song Contest that year. The winning song, It's My Time, was penned by Diane Warren and Andrew Lloyd Webber and was sung in the contest by Jade Ewen, who the public voted to represent the United Kingdom.

Norton's debut jokes received some positive reviews from the British press. The Guardian noted his comments on Iceland's entry, which finished in second place, had "rooted around in a cupboard and found an old bridesmaid dress from 1987" and the Armenian singers, who finished in 10th place, were sporting traditional dress, "which would be true if you come from the village where Liberace is the mayor." The Times noted his highlighting of the arrest of 30 gay rights protesters in Moscow – "heavy-handed policing has really marred what has been a fantastic Eurovision."

In 2015, Norton, along with Petra Mede, hosted the Eurovision Song Contest's Greatest Hits concert show on 31 March at the Eventim Apollo, in Hammersmith, London to commemorate the contest's 60th anniversary.

Norton played a fictionalised version of himself in his role of the British Eurovision commentator in the 2020 Netflix film Eurovision Song Contest: The Story of Fire Saga.

Norton co-hosted the final of the 2023 contest in Liverpool alongside Alesha Dixon, actress Hannah Waddingham and Ukrainian singer Julia Sanina, in addition to his usual commentary role which was shared with Mel Giedroyc. With this, he also became the second-oldest person to ever host the Eurovision Song Contest, after the French presenter Léon Zitrone in 1978.

=== ITV ===
In 2024, Norton returned to ITV to present a revival of Wheel of Fortune, including the celebrity version and an Australian revival, featuring Gok Wan and Charlotte Church.

=== Other activities ===
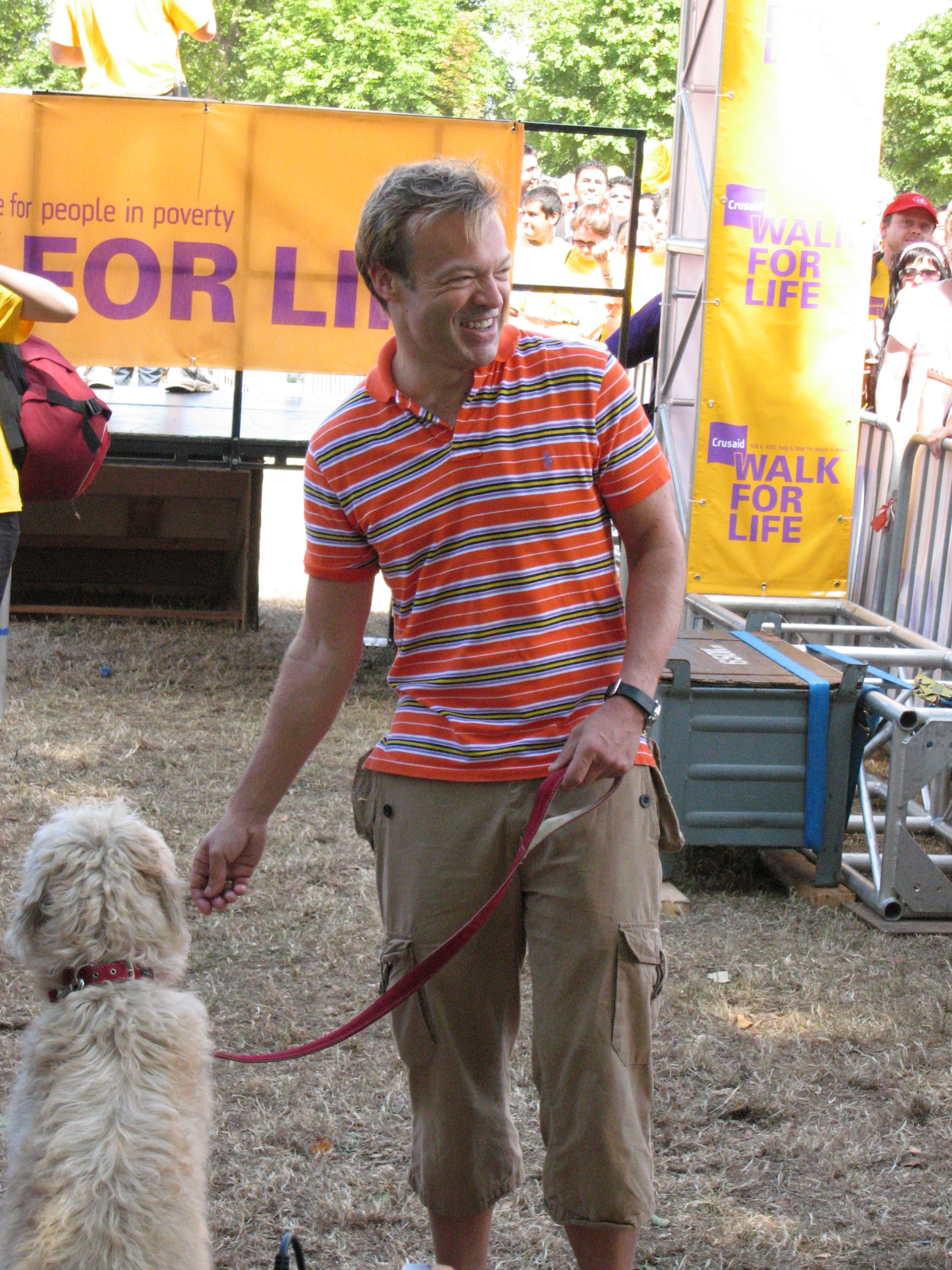
Norton with his dog Bailey in 2006, supporting Crusaid

Norton played Mr Puckov in the 2006 American comedy spoof film Another Gay Movie. In 2007, Norton played Taylor in the romantic comedy film I Could Never Be Your Woman.

Norton was involved in a high-publicity advertising campaign for the UK National Lottery as an animated unicorn, the stooge to a character based on Lady Luck (played by Fay Ripley). He has also advertised McVitie's biscuits.

In 1999, Norton featured in the music video for Boyzone song "When The Going Gets Tough". Eight years later, in 2007, he featured in Girls Aloud and Sugababes' music video for the single "Walk This Way". Both songs were for Comic Relief.

In January 2009, Norton made his West End stage debut in a revival of La Cage Aux Folles at the Playhouse Theatre. In 2009, Norton was the host of the comedy game-show Most Popular on US cable television channel WE tv.

Norton wrote an advice column in The Daily Telegraph newspaper from 2006 to 2018. In October 2010, his columns were made into a book entitled Ask Graham, published by John Blake Publishing. In late 2018, Norton stood down from the role and the newspaper found a replacement as their agony aunt in Richard Madeley.

In 2016, Norton published his debut novel Holding, published by Hodder & Stoughton, about a murder in an Irish rural community. Holding won Popular Fiction Book of the Year in the Bord Gais Energy Irish Book Awards 2016. In 2022, an adaptation of the book for television, directed by Kathy Burke, aired on ITV. In 2026, Forever Home, a second adaptation from a Norton book for television was produced.

On 7 March 2013, Norton broke the Guinness World Record for "Most Questions Asked on a TV Chat Show" on Comic Relief's Big Chat, which raised £1.02 million.

In 2014, Norton criticised the decision by Irish broadcaster RTÉ to settle out of court with opponents of gay marriage who claimed they had been defamed in an edition of the Saturday Night Show.

In 2014, Norton publicly backed "Hacked Off" and its campaign toward UK press self-regulation by "safeguarding the press from political interference while also giving vital protection to the vulnerable".

In October 2014, Norton released his second memoir, The Life and Loves of a He-Devil. It won in the Non-Fiction Book of the Year category at the 2014 Irish Book Awards. Also in 2014, he was named in the top 10 on the World Pride Power list.

Norton has a shareholding of two percent in New Zealand winery Invivo Wines. Norton has his own wine range in collaboration with Invivo, the first wine was first released in 2014.

In July 2015, the Bishop of Cork, Paul Colton, hosted an evening with Norton involving 90 minutes of interview, questions, and answers with an audience of more than 400 people. The event, part of the West Cork Literary Festival, was sold out.

On 9 October 2020, Norton announced via Twitter he had been cast as the voice of Moonwind, a spiritual sign twirler, in the Disney/Pixar animated feature Soul, starring Jamie Foxx and Tina Fey.

== Personal life ==
Norton primarily resides in the Wapping area of London. He also owns homes in Murray Hill, Manhattan, and in Ahakista, County Cork. He previously had a home in Bexhill-on-Sea, East Sussex, but sold it in 2022.

In 1989, Norton was a victim of a violent mugging by a group of attackers in London where he lost half of his blood and nearly died. He said that an elderly couple were the ones who found him and that they "saved his life" after calling for an ambulance. He did not think the attack was homophobic, as he was walking alone at the time. He was hospitalised for two and a half weeks before recovering from the attack.

In January 2012, Norton's home was burgled and the keys to his Lexus were stolen. He appealed for the return of his car during his BBC Radio 2 show the following day.

He adopted two dogs from the UK charity Dogs Trust in 2012 which he regarded as his "significant others", a labradoodle called Bailey and a terrier called Madge. Madge was at least 16 years old when she died in December 2019. In October 2020, he said that Bailey had recently died in Cork at the age of 15.

Norton had a five-year on-again, off-again relationship with Kristian Seeber, whom he met at Barracuda Lounge in New York City in 2001. Seeber performs as drag queen Tina Burner, and moved to the United Kingdom to be with Norton until their separation in 2006. Norton had a two-year relationship with Trevor Patterson which ended in 2013, and a three-year relationship with Andrew Smith, which ended in 2015.

On 10 July 2022, Norton married Scottish filmmaker Jono McLeod at Bantry House in County Cork.

In October 2022, Norton was involved in controversy over comments he made in an interview with Mariella Frostrup at the Cheltenham Literature Festival. He expressed scepticism over the existence of cancel culture, arguing that "I think the word should be 'accountability'." When Frostrup countered that J. K. Rowling had been "deluged with ... anger, rage and attempts at censorship" over her views on transgender rights, Norton responded that it would be better to "talk to trans people, talk to the parents of trans kids, talk to doctors" about the issue than to celebrities like himself. Rowling criticised Norton's comments on Twitter, citing him as part of a "recent spate of bearded men stepping confidently onto their soapboxes to define what a woman is and throw their support behind rape and death threats to those who dare disagree". Following further criticism on Twitter from supporters of Rowling, Norton deactivated his Twitter account.

In December 2025, a Facebook page began sharing deepfake videos which depicted Norton making racist and anti-immigrant comments. In June 2026, he won a case against Meta AI to identify the perpetrators.

== Performances and works ==
=== Films ===
| Year | Title | Character | Notes |
|---|---|---|---|
| 1999 | Stargay | Graham Solex | |
| 2005 | Generation Fame | Self | Television film |
| 2006 | Another Gay Movie | Mr Puckov | |
| 2007 | I Could Never Be Your Woman | Taylor | |
| 2007 | Robbie the Reindeer in Close Encounters of the Herd Kind | Computer voice | Short film |
| 2016 | Absolutely Fabulous: The Movie | Himself | |
| 2020 | Eurovision Song Contest: The Story of Fire Saga | Himself | |
| 2020 | Soul | Moonwind (voice) | |
| 2020 | The Stand In | Himself | |
| 2024 | The Idea of You | Himself | |

=== Television ===
| Year | Title | Role | Notes |
|---|---|---|---|
| 1996 | Carnal Knowledge | Co-host | 1 series |
| 1996–1998 | Father Ted | Father Noel Furlong | 3 episodes |
| 1997 | Bring Me the Head of Light Entertainment | Himself | |
| 1998–2002 | So Graham Norton | Host | 5 series |
| 2001 | Graham Goes To Dollywood | Himself | |
| 2001 | The Kumars at No. 42 | Himself | |
| 2001 | Live at the Roundhouse | Himself | Comedy special |
| 2001 | Rex the Runt: A Crap Day Out | The Plants voice | |
| 2001 | Rex the Runt: Patio | Osvalde Halitosis voice | |
| 2002 | Absolutely Fabulous | Himself | Episode: "Gay" |
| 2002–03 | V Graham Norton | Host | |
| 2003–04 | Tough Crowd with Colin Quinn | Himself | 5 episodes |
| 2004–05 | The Graham Norton Effect | Host | 13 episodes |
| 2005–06 | Graham Norton's Bigger Picture | Himself | |
| 2005–06 | Strictly Dance Fever | Himself | |
| 2006 | The Last Ever, Ever Footballers' Wives | Brendan Spunk | |
| 2006 | How Do You Solve a Problem Like Maria? | Host/Presenter | 9 episodes |
| 2007 | When Will I Be Famous? | Himself | |
| 2007 | Who Do You Think You Are? | Himself | |
| 2007 | Saving Planet Earth | Himself | Episode: "Saving Wolves" |
| 2007 | Kathy Griffin: My Life on the D-List | Himself | Episode: "Kathy Goes to London" |
| 2007 | Live Earth | Himself | TV special documentary |
| 2007 | Eurovision Dance Contest 2007 | Host | TV special |
| 2007 | Any Dream Will Do | Presenter | 11 episodes |
| 2007–2019 | The British Academy Television Awards | Host | Host for 2007 to 2011, 2013 to 2016, and 2019. |
| 2007–present | The Graham Norton Show | Host | 33 series |
| 2008 | I'd Do Anything | Presenter | 13 episodes |
| 2008 | The One and Only | Himself | |
| 2008 | Eurovision Dance Contest 2008 | Host | TV special |
| 2009 | Totally Saturday | Himself | 1 episode and unaired pilot |
| 2009–10 | Eurovision: Your Country Needs You | Host | 6 episodes |
| 2009–present | Eurovision Song Contest | UK commentator/Co-presenter | Comments grand finals only and co-presented the 2023 final edition |
| 2010 | Over the Rainbow | Host | 18 episodes |
| 2011–12 | Would You Rather...? with Graham Norton | Presenter | BBC America |
| 2015 | Eurovision Song Contest's Greatest Hits | Co-presenter | With Petra Mede |
| 2015 | Adele at the BBC | Presenter | Television special |
| 2016 | RuPaul's Drag Race All Stars | Himself/Guest judge | Season 2, "Drag Fish Tank" |
| 2016–2019 | Children in Need | Host | With Ade Adepitan and Mel Giedroyc |
| 2017 | Let It Shine | Co-presenter | 6 episodes |
| 2018 | The Biggest Weekend | Himself | |
| 2019–present | RuPaul's Drag Race UK | Himself/Judge | |
| 2020 | British Academy Film Awards | Host | |
| 2020 | Eurovision: Come Together | Host | |
| 2020 | Eurovision: Europe Shine a Light | UK commentator | |
| 2021 | Queen of the Universe | Host | |
| 2021 | Celebrity Gogglebox for Su2c | Himself | Stand Up to Cancer special (Series 18, episode 5) |
| 2022–present | RuPaul's Drag Race: UK vs. the World | Himself/Judge | |
2024
| 2024 | LOL: Last One Laughing Ireland | Host | Amazon Prime show |
| 2024 | Eurovision 2024: Graham Meets Olly | Host | One-off special with Olly Alexander |
| 2024 | RuPaul's Drag Race Global All Stars | Guest Judge | |
| 2024–present | Wheel of Fortune | Host | ITV and Network 10 (Australia) reboot/revivals |
| 2025 | Doctor Who | Himself | The Interstellar Song Contest (Series 15, episode 6) |
| 2026 | The Neighbourhood | Himself | Reality show |
| 2026 | Saturday Night Live UK | Himself | Episode: "Tina Fey/Wet Leg" |

=== Music videos ===
| Title | Date | Artist | Role | Refs. |
|---|---|---|---|---|
| "Opalite" | 6 February 2026 | Taylor Swift | Nope-alite Spokesperson | |

=== Biography ===
| Title | Date | Publisher | ISBN |
|---|---|---|---|
| So Me | 1 September 2004 | Hodder & Stoughton | 978-0-340-83348-3 |
| Ask Graham | 4 October 2010 | John Blake | 978-1-84358-297-7 |
| The Life and Loves of a He Devil | 23 October 2014 | Hodder & Stoughton | 978-1-4447-9026-9 |

==== Fiction ====
| Title | Date | Publisher | ISBN |
|---|---|---|---|
| Holding | 6 October 2016 | Hodder & Stoughton | 978-1-4447-9200-3 |
| A Keeper | 4 October 2018 | Coronet Books | 978-1473664975 |
| Home Stretch | 26 April 2021 | Coronet Books | 978-1-4736-6516-3 |
| Forever Home | 29 September 2022 | Coronet Books | 978-1-5293-9139-8 |
| Frankie | 12 September 2024 | Coronet Books | 978-1-5293-9144-2 |

== Accolades ==
| Year | Award | | Work | Result | Notes |
|---|---|---|---|---|---|
| 1999 | Gaytime Award | Gay Presenter of the Year | —N/a | Won | |
| 2000 | British Academy Television Awards | Best Entertainment Performance | So Graham Norton | Won | |
| 2001 | Royal Television Society | Best Presenter | So Graham Norton | Won | |
| 2001 | British Academy Television Awards | Best Entertainment Performance | So Graham Norton | Won | |
| 2002 | British Academy Television Awards | Best Entertainment Performance | So Graham Norton | Won | |
| 2011 | British Academy Television Awards | Best Entertainment Performance | The Graham Norton Show | Won | |
| 2012 | British Academy Television Awards | Best Entertainment Performance | The Graham Norton Show | Won | |
| 2013 | British Academy Television Awards | Best Entertainment Performance | The Graham Norton Show | Nominated | |
| 2013 | British Academy Television Awards | Lew Grade Award for Entertainment Programme | The Graham Norton Show | Won | |
| 2014 | British Academy Television Awards | Best Entertainment Performance | The Graham Norton Show | Nominated | |
| 2015 | British Academy Television Awards | Best Entertainment Performance | The Graham Norton Show | Nominated | |
| 2015 | British Academy Television Awards | Best Comedy Programme or Series | The Graham Norton Show | Won | |
| 2016 | British Academy Television Awards | Best Entertainment Performance | The Graham Norton Show | Nominated | |
| 2017 | National Television Awards | Special Recognition Award | The Graham Norton Show | Won | |
| 2018 | British Academy Television Awards | Best Entertainment Performance | The Graham Norton Show | Won | |

== See also ==
- List of celebrities who own wineries and vineyards

| Preceded by (Republic of Ireland) Terry Wogan | Eurovision Song Contest UK television commentator 2009–present With: Mel Giedroyc (2023) | Succeeded by Incumbent |
| Preceded by (Italy) Alessandro Cattelan, Laura Pausini and (United Kingdom) Mika | Eurovision Song Contest presenter 2023 (final only); With: (United Kingdom) Alesha Dixon, Hannah Waddingham and (Ukraine) Julia Sanina | Succeeded by (Sweden) Petra Mede and Malin Åkerman |
