= Robert Prizeman =

English composer (1952–2021)

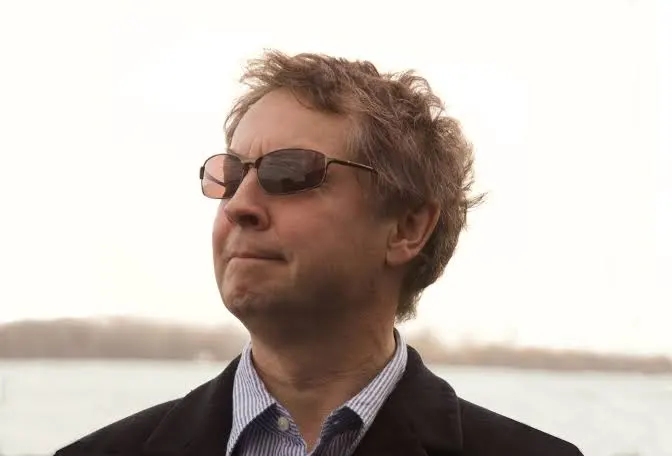

Background information
- Born: Robert Gordon Prizeman; 28 February 1952; Lambeth, London, England
- Died: 8 September 2021 (aged 69)
- Occupations: Composer; conductor; choirmaster

Robert Gordon Prizeman (28 February 1952 – 8 September 2021) was a British composer. He was born in the London Borough of Lambeth. He attended Trinity School in Croydon and the Royal College of Music in South Kensington. Prizeman studied organ with Timothy Farrell and John Birch, and harpsichord with Millicent Silver.

He became the programme's musical director in 1985, and in 1986 composed the theme to Songs of Praise, published by Chester Music and Wilhelm Hansen. The programme's theme was initially an organ composition.

He worked as a choirmaster from 1970. In 1984 his choir performed with Sal Solo in his arrangement of San Damiano. He founded the boys choir Libera in 1999, which is based in south London. In 2010 he became an Associate of the Royal School of Church Music. He died on 8 September 2021.
