= List of The Graham Norton Show episodes =

The Graham Norton Show is a British comedy chat show broadcast on BBC One in the United Kingdom. It was shown on BBC Two from February 2007 to May 2009 and has been on BBC One since October 2009. Presented by Irish comedian Graham Norton, the show's format is very similar to his previous Channel 4 programmes, So Graham Norton and V Graham Norton, both of which were also produced by So Television.

The show's latest series, the thirty-fourth, began on 25 September 2026. As of 23 October 2026, 577 episodes of The Graham Norton Show have aired.

== Series overview ==
Series	Episodes	Originally released		
Series	Episodes	First released	Last released	Network
1	19	22 February 2007	5 July 2007	BBC Two
2	13	11 October 2007	26 December 2007	BBC Two
3	12	17 April 2008	3 July 2008	BBC Two
4	14	2 October 2008	30 December 2008	BBC Two
5	12	5 March 2009	28 May 2009	BBC Two
6	13	5 October 2009	31 December 2009	BBC One
7	12	12 April 2010	28 June 2010	BBC One
8	20	22 October 2010	11 March 2011	BBC One
9	13	15 April 2011	8 July 2011	BBC One
10	21	21 October 2011	16 March 2012	BBC One
11	13	13 April 2012	6 July 2012	BBC One
12	20	19 October 2012	22 March 2013	BBC One
13	14	5 April 2013	5 July 2013	BBC One
14	20	11 October 2013	28 February 2014	BBC One
15	13	4 April 2014	27 June 2014	BBC One
16	24	26 September 2014	20 March 2015	BBC One
17	13	10 April 2015	3 July 2015	BBC One
18	20	25 September 2015	19 February 2016	BBC One
19	15	25 March 2016	1 July 2016	BBC One
20	22	30 September 2016	3 March 2017	BBC One
21	13	7 April 2017	30 June 2017	BBC One
22	21	29 September 2017	23 February 2018	BBC One
23	13	6 April 2018	29 June 2018	BBC One
24	21	28 September 2018	22 February 2019	BBC One
25	13	5 April 2019	28 June 2019	BBC One
26	21	27 September 2019	21 February 2020	BBC One
27	9	10 April 2020	5 June 2020	BBC One
28	27	2 October 2020	30 April 2021	BBC One
29	23	24 September 2021	11 March 2022	BBC One
30	22	30 September 2022	10 March 2023	BBC One
31	22	29 September 2023	22 March 2024	BBC One
32	22	27 September 2024	7 March 2025	BBC One
33	22	26 September 2025	6 March 2026	BBC One
34	TBA	25 September 2026	TBA	BBC One

== Episodes ==
=== Series 1 (2007) ===
No. overall	No. in series	Original release date	Guest(s)
Pilot	0	N/A	Sarah Beeny and Sandi Toksvig
1	1	22 February 2007	Elijah Wood, Kim Cattrall and Heloise and the Savoir Faire
2	2	1 March 2007	Orlando Bloom and Samantha Morton
3	3	8 March 2007	Joan Rivers and Julian McMahon
4	4	15 March 2007	Jenny Eclair and Louis Walsh
5	5	22 March 2007	Ioan Gruffudd, Jessie Wallace and Scooch
6	6	29 March 2007	David Tennant, Jo Brand and The Proclaimers
7	7	12 April 2007	Julia Sawalha and Liz Smith
8	8	19 April 2007	Barbara Windsor and Robert Webb
9	9	26 April 2007	Dustin Hoffman, Lisa Hoffman and Mika
10	10	3 May 2007	Dawn French and Sarah Beeny
11	11	10 May 2007	Gérard Depardieu and Tori Amos
12	12	17 May 2007	Joan Collins, Jason Donovan and Ben's Brother
13	13	24 May 2007	Miriam Margolyes, Rupert Everett and The Zimmers
14	14	31 May 2007	Matt Lucas, Andrew Lloyd Webber and Sinéad O'Connor
15	15	7 June 2007	Jennifer Coolidge and Enrique Iglesias
16	16	14 June 2007	Joanna Lumley and Jon Bon Jovi
17	17	21 June 2007	Alice Cooper, Sandi Toksvig and Gareth Gates
18	18	28 June 2007	Dennis Hopper, Ardal O'Hanlon and Joss Stone
19	19	5 July 2007	Tyne Daly, Sharon Gless and Natalie Imbruglia

=== Series 2 (2007) ===
No. overall	No. in series	Original release date	Guest(s)
20	1	11 October 2007	Courtney Love, Louis Walsh, Brian Capron and Katie Melua
21	2	18 October 2007	Gabriel Byrne, Letitia Dean and The Backstreet Boys
22	3	25 October 2007	Melanie C, Josh Hartnett and Rufus Wainwright
23	4	1 November 2007	Jackie Collins, John Waters and Westlife
24	5	8 November 2007	Frankie Boyle, Elle Macpherson and KT Tunstall
25	6	15 November 2007	Jo Brand, Trinny Woodall, Susannah Constantine and Alison Moyet
26	7	22 November 2007	John Schneider, Tom Wopat, Catherine Bach and Phil Nichol
27	8	29 November 2007	Alan Carr, Glenn Close and Amy MacDonald
28	9	6 December 2007	Nigella Lawson, Marilyn Manson and Rihanna
29	10	13 December 2007	Sharon Osbourne, David Boreanaz, Louis Walsh and Stereophonics
30	11	20 December 2007	Miriam Margolyes, Ashley Jensen and Mika
31	12	26 December 2007	Russell Brand, Lorraine Kelly, Christopher Biggins, Barbara Windsor and The Feeling
32	Special	6 January 2008	Compilation Show

=== Series 3 (2008) ===
No. overall	No. in series	Original release date	Guest(s)
33	1	17 April 2008	Kevin Bacon, Tony Curtis and Robyn
34	2	24 April 2008	Martin Sheen, Ed Byrne and will.i.am with Cheryl Cole
35	3	1 May 2008	Robert Wagner, Stefanie Powers, Chesney Hawkes and Sandi Thom
36	4	8 May 2008	Jimmy Carr and Minnie Driver
37	5	15 May 2008	Cynthia Nixon, David Mitchell, Liz Smith and OneRepublic
38	6	22 May 2008	Jackie Chan, Dawn French and Duffy
39	7	29 May 2008	Dame Edna Everage, Ray Mears and Alanis Morissette
40	8	5 June 2008	Susan Sarandon, Jon Culshaw, Jodie Prenger and The Feeling
41	9	12 June 2008	Gordon Ramsay, Juliette Binoche and Scouting for Girls
42	10	19 June 2008	Joan Rivers, Alicia Silverstone and Freemasons
43	11	26 June 2008	John Malkovich, Alan Davies and Sharleen Spiteri
44	12	3 July 2008	Catherine Tate, James Nesbitt and The Kooks

=== Series 4 (2008) ===
No. overall	No. in series	Original release date	Guest(s)
45	1	2 October 2008	Harry Shearer, Eddie Izzard and Travis
46	2	9 October 2008	Jennifer Saunders and Cyndi Lauper
47	3	16 October 2008	Goldie Hawn, Sandi Toksvig and Alphabeat
48	4	23 October 2008	Ricky Gervais, Thandie Newton and Anastacia
49	5	30 October 2008	Mickey Rourke, Jessica Biel and Martha Wainwright
50	6	6 November 2008	Karen Allen, Frank Skinner and Glasvegas
51	7	13 November 2008	Robin Williams and Estelle
52	8	20 November 2008	Alan Carr and Sir Tom Jones
53	9	27 November 2008	Reese Witherspoon, Paul O'Grady and The Ting Tings
54	10	4 December 2008	Barry Manilow
55	11	11 December 2008	Brendan Fraser, Martina Navratilova and Alesha Dixon
56	12	18 December 2008	Jack Dee, Davina McCall and Razorlight
57	13	30 December 2008	Joe Swash, Michael McIntyre, Tim Minchin and Boyzone
58	14	27 December 2008	Compilation Show

=== Series 5 (2009) ===
No. overall	No. in series	Original release date	Guest(s)
59	1	5 March 2009	Sarah, Duchess of York and Ed Byrne
60	2	12 March 2009	Greg Kinnear and Ruth Jones
61	3	19 March 2009	Ronnie Corbett, Ricky Gervais and Shaun Williamson
62	4	26 March 2009	Zac Efron, David Walliams and Pet Shop Boys
63	5	2 April 2009	Roberto Benigni and Patsy Kensit
64	6	16 April 2009	Gillian Anderson, Chris Addison and Sinéad O'Connor
65	7	23 April 2009	Katie Price, Peter Andre and Jimmy Carr
66	8	30 April 2009	Anna Friel and Matt Lucas
67	9	7 May 2009	Duncan Bannatyne, Joan Rivers and Chesney Hawkes
68	10	14 May 2009	Willem Dafoe, Ashley Jensen and Lily Allen
69	11	21 May 2009	Isabella Rossellini, Alistair McGowan and Juliette Lewis
70	12	28 May 2009	Kurt Russell and Jenny Eclair

=== Series 6 (2009) ===
No. overall	No. in series	Original release date	Guest(s)
71	1	5 October 2009	Ozzy and Sharon Osbourne, Ricky Gervais and Olivia Newton-John
72	2	12 October 2009	Anna Paquin, David Mitchell, Robert Webb and Paolo Nutini
73	3	19 October 2009	Katie Price, Jo Brand and Jackie Collins
74	4	26 October 2009	Lily Cole, Isabella Rossellini, Sue Perkins and Michael Bublé
75	5	2 November 2009	Katherine Jenkins, Rob Brydon and Harry Connick Jr.
76	6	9 November 2009	David Tennant, Johnny Vegas and Alison Moyet
77	7	16 November 2009	Dawn French, Michael Palin and Sir Rod Stewart
78	8	23 November 2009	Michael Sheen, Rhod Gilbert and Dame Shirley Bassey
79	9	30 November 2009	Stephen Fry, Bill Bailey, Cesar Millan and Annie Lennox & David Gray
80	10	7 December 2009	Catherine Tate, Jimmy Carr and 50 Cent
81	11	14 December 2009	Robert Downey Jr., Ed Byrne and Will Young
82	12	21 December 2009	Compilation Show
83	Special	31 December 2009	New Year's Eve: Sarah Jessica Parker, Joan Rivers, Jedward, Dominic West and Sharleen Spiteri

=== Series 7 (2010) ===
No. overall	No. in series	Original release date	Guest(s)
84	1	12 April 2010	Christina Ricci, Stephen Merchant, Ricky Gervais and Pixie Lott
85	2	19 April 2010	Toni Collette, Billie Piper, Shappi Khorsandi and Scouting for Girls
86	3	26 April 2010	John Cleese, Martin Clunes, Lee Mack and Jane Turner
87	4	3 May 2010	Jennifer Lopez, Alan Davies, Karen Gillan and Ben's Brother
88	5	10 May 2010	Brooke Shields, Miranda Hart, Jedward and The Bacon Brothers
89	6	17 May 2010	Andrew Lloyd Webber, Minnie Driver, Ruth Jones and Katie Melua
90	7	24 May 2010	Janet Jackson, Tyler Perry, Marcus Brigstocke and Eric Idle
91	8	31 May 2010	Chris Rock, Joshua Jackson and Diana Vickers
92	9	7 June 2010	Miley Cyrus, Jack Whitehall and Usher
93	10	14 June 2010	Amanda Holden, Bill Bailey and Kelly Rowland
94	11	21 June 2010	David Hyde Pierce, Joanna Lumley, Hamish Blake, Andy Lee and Fyfe Dangerfield
95	12	28 June 2010	Anna Kournikova, Jason Manford and Katy Perry

=== Series 8 (2010–2011) ===
No. overall	No. in series	Original release date	Guest(s)
96	1	22 October 2010	Maggie Gyllenhaal, Russell Howard and Charlotte Church
97	2	29 October 2010	Alan Sugar, Pamela Stephenson, Lee Mack and James Blunt
98	3	5 November 2010	Joan Rivers, Johnny Knoxville, Catherine Tate and Pet Shop Boys
99	4	12 November 2010	Colin Farrell, Rhod Gilbert, Daniel Radcliffe and Rihanna
100	5	26 November 2010	David Haye, Stephen Fry and Bette Midler
101	6	3 December 2010	Jack Black, Miranda Hart, John Waters and Justin Bieber
102	7	10 December 2010	Barry Manilow, Katherine Jenkins, Sean Lock, Ann Widdecombe and KT Tunstall
103	8	17 December 2010	Cher, Dawn French and The Script
104	9	24 December 2010	Matt Smith, Kara Tointon, Matt Lucas, David Walliams, Artem Chigvintsev and Ellie Goulding
105	Special	31 December 2010	New Year's Eve Show: Elizabeth McGovern, Louis Walsh, Alan Davies and Eliza Doolittle
106	10	7 January 2011	Keanu Reeves, Emilia Fox, Marcus Brigstocke and Imelda May
107	11	14 January 2011	Matt LeBlanc, Mary Portas, David Mitchell and Donald Sutherland
108	12	21 January 2011	Vince Vaughn, Sarah Millican and Sean "Diddy" Combs
109	13	28 January 2011	Kate Hudson, Russell Kane and Tinie Tempah
110	14	4 February 2011	Dame Helen Mirren, Ed Byrne, Emily Blunt and The Wanted
111	15	11 February 2011	Sigourney Weaver, Brian Cox, Sandi Toksvig and Sugarland
112	16	18 February 2011	Ashton Kutcher, Heston Blumenthal, Greg Davies and Hurts
113	17	25 February 2011	Matthew Fox, Diane Kruger, John Bishop and Jessie J
114	18	4 March 2011	Stanley Tucci, Miriam Margolyes, Jimmy Carr and Bruno Mars
115	19	11 March 2011	Bradley Cooper, Jo Brand, Stephen Merchant, Liam Neeson and Blue

=== Series 9 (2011) ===
No. overall	No. in series	Original release date	Guest(s)
116	1	15 April 2011	David Tennant, Catherine Tate, Jon Richardson and Josh Groban
117	2	22 April 2011	k.d. lang, Bill Bailey and Jennifer Hudson
118	3	29 April 2011	Jack Whitehall, Miranda Hart, Nico Evers-Swindell, Camilla Luddington and Adele
119	4	6 May 2011	Reese Witherspoon, Robert Pattinson, Shappi Khorsandi and Hugh Laurie
120	5	13 May 2011	Gwyneth Paltrow, Geoffrey Rush, Jason Byrne and Lady Gaga
121	6	20 May 2011	Snoop Dogg, Elle Macpherson, Cuba Gooding Jr. and Cee Lo Green
122	7	27 May 2011	Rob Lowe, Alex Kingston, Bradley Cooper, Ed Helms and Aloe Blacc
123	8	3 June 2011	James McAvoy, Jack Dee and Liza Minnelli
124	9	10 June 2011	Tom Hanks, Simon Pegg and Nicole Scherzinger
125	10	17 June 2011	Cameron Diaz, Bear Grylls, Kathy Griffin and Friendly Fires
126	11	24 June 2011	Kim Cattrall, Jessie Wallace, Lee Mack and The Saturdays
127	12	1 July 2011	Ewan McGregor, Chris O'Dowd and Example
128	Special	8 July 2011	Compilation Show

=== Series 10 (2011–2012) ===
No. overall	No. in series	Original release date	Guest(s)
129	1	21 October 2011	Kate Winslet, Jamie Bell, Rob Brydon and Noah and the Whale
130	2	28 October 2011	James McAvoy, Joanna Lumley, John Bishop, Nancy Dell'Olio and Arctic Monkeys
131	3	4 November 2011	Ricky Gervais, Carey Mulligan, Ed Byrne, Johnny Depp and Snow Patrol
132	4	11 November 2011	Sir Cliff Richard, Micky Flanagan, Alan Sugar and Kelly Rowland
133	5	25 November 2011	Robin Williams, Jennifer Saunders, Elijah Wood and JLS
134	6	2 December 2011	Jessica Biel, James Corden, Sarah Millican, Bradley Cooper and Lenny Kravitz
135	7	9 December 2011	Antonio Banderas, Salma Hayek, Jimmy Carr and Coldplay
136	8	16 December 2011	Alesha Dixon, Eddie Izzard, Robert Downey Jr., Jude Law and Rebecca Ferguson
137	Special	23 December 2011	Christmas Special: Matt Smith, Gillian Anderson, Russell Kane, Harry Judd, Dougie Poynter, Hilary Devey, Gareth Malone and The Military Wives
138	Special	30 December 2011	Compilation Show
139	9	6 January 2012	Gerard Butler, Karen Gillan, Martin Freeman, Uggie and Noel Gallagher
140	10	13 January 2012	Madonna, James D'Arcy, Andrea Riseborough and Emeli Sandé
141	11	20 January 2012	Sir Kenneth Branagh, Zach Braff, Frank Skinner and Taio Cruz
142	12	27 January 2012	Liam Neeson, Sir Patrick Stewart, Alan Davies and Ed Sheeran
143	13	3 February 2012	Reese Witherspoon, Alex Kingston, Reginald D. Hunter and The Musgraves
144	14	10 February 2012	Dame Judi Dench, Dev Patel, Sue Perkins and Will Young
145	15	17 February 2012	Daniel Radcliffe, Cuba Gooding Jr., Omid Djalili and Sinéad O'Connor
146	16	24 February 2012	Mark Wahlberg, Minnie Driver, Mark Watson and Christina Perri
147	17	2 March 2012	John Cusack, Goldie Hawn, Marcus Brigstocke and Kasabian
148	18	9 March 2012	Gérard Depardieu, Damian Lewis, Dominic West and Olly Murs
149	19	16 March 2012	Hugh Grant, Joanna Page, Jo Brand and David Guetta

=== Series 11 (2012) ===
No. overall	No. in series	Original release date	Guest(s)
150	1	13 April 2012	Ewan McGregor, Cate Blanchett, Michael Sheen, Matt Lucas and Keane
151	2	20 April 2012	Mark Ruffalo, Nicki Minaj, John Bishop and Rufus Wainwright
152	3	27 April 2012	Zac Efron, Matt LeBlanc, Lee Mack and Marina and the Diamonds
153	4	4 May 2012	Dame Julie Walters, Simon Amstell, Didier Drogba and Jessie J
154	5	11 May 2012	Kristen Stewart, Chris Rock, Stephen Mangan and Engelbert Humperdinck
155	6	18 May 2012	Will Smith, Gary Barlow and Sir Tom Jones
156	7	25 May 2012	Cameron Diaz, Sir David Attenborough, Kathy Burke and Scissor Sisters
157	8	1 June 2012	Jon Hamm, Charlize Theron, Steve Coogan and Rumer
158	9	8 June 2012	Katy Perry, Ross Noble and Cheryl Cole
159	10	15 June 2012	Emily Blunt, Russell Brand and Paloma Faith
160	11	22 June 2012	will.i.am, Miriam Margolyes, Greg Davies and Adam Lambert
161	12	29 June 2012	Danny DeVito, Charlotte Church, Rhod Gilbert and Fun
162	Special	6 July 2012	Compilation Show

=== Series 12 (2012–2013) ===
No. overall	No. in series	Original release date	Guest(s)
163	1	19 October 2012	Arnold Schwarzenegger, Miranda Hart, Ronnie Corbett and Usher
164	2	26 October 2012	Daniel Craig, Dame Judi Dench, Javier Bardem and Of Monsters and Men
165	3	2 November 2012	Darcey Bussell, Paul O'Grady, Uggie, Felix Baumgartner and Robbie Williams
166	4	9 November 2012	Cameron Diaz, Sarah Millican and Sir Rod Stewart
167	5	23 November 2012	Helena Bonham Carter, Jack Whitehall, Sir Michael Palin and Michael Bublé feat. The Puppini Sisters
168	6	30 November 2012	Jake Gyllenhaal, Joan Rivers, Jeremy Clarkson, James May and Kesha
169	7	7 December 2012	Daniel Radcliffe, Jessica Ennis, Ricky Gervais and Bruno Mars
170	8	14 December 2012	Martin Freeman, Dawn French, Lee Mack and Girls Aloud
171	9	21 December 2012	Dustin Hoffman, Sir Billy Connolly, Jennifer Saunders, Matt Smith and Amy MacDonald
172	Special	31 December 2012	New Year's Eve: Tom Cruise, Rosamund Pike, Hugh Jackman, Billy Crystal, John Bishop, Mary Berry, Paul Hollywood and Pink
173	10	4 January 2013	Josh Groban, Billie Piper, Frank Skinner and Example
174	11	11 January 2013	Quentin Tarantino, James McAvoy, Alan Davies and Emeli Sandé
175	12	18 January 2013	Denzel Washington, Nicholas Hoult, Bill Bailey and Conor Maynard
176	13	25 January 2013	Minnie Driver, Clare Balding, Stephen Merchant and The Script
177	14	1 February 2013	Dame Helen Mirren, Paul Rudd, Leslie Mann and Little Mix
178	15	8 February 2013	Mark Wahlberg, Sarah Silverman, Michael Fassbender and Laura Mvula
179	16	15 February 2013	Jeremy Renner, Gemma Arterton, Matt Lucas, Delia Smith and Rita Ora
180	17	22 February 2013	Richard Gere, Saoirse Ronan, John Malkovich and Taylor Swift
181	18	1 March 2013	Dame Judi Dench, Jude Law, Mila Kunis and Olly Murs
182	Special	22 March 2013	Compilation Show

=== Series 13 (2013) ===
No. overall	No. in series	Original release date	Guest(s)
183	1	5 April 2013	Tom Cruise, Olga Kurylenko, Gerard Butler and Paramore
184	2	12 April 2013	Amanda Holden, Jack Dee and Michael Bublé
185	3	19 April 2013	Gwyneth Paltrow, Mo Farah, Lee Mack and Hurts
186	4	26 April 2013	Lewis Hamilton, Pedro Almodóvar, Dara Ó Briain and Alison Moyet
187	5	3 May 2013	Chris Pine, Kim Cattrall, Benedict Cumberbatch and Bonnie Tyler
188	6	10 May 2013	Alan Sugar, Olivia Colman and Hugh Laurie
189	7	17 May 2013	Daniel Radcliffe, Baz Luhrmann, Isla Fisher, Ed Byrne and Wretch 32
190	8	24 May 2013	Will Smith, Jaden Smith, Bradley Cooper, Heather Graham, Michael Douglas and Selena Gomez
191	9	31 May 2013	Jennifer Lopez, Freddie Flintoff, David Mitchell and Declan Bennett & Zrinka Cvitešić
192	10	7 June 2013	Dan Stevens, Hayden Panettiere, Micky Flanagan and Robin Thicke feat. Pharrell Williams
193	11	14 June 2013	Henry Cavill, Amy Adams, Russell Crowe and Katy B
194	12	21 June 2013	Steve Carell, Kristen Wiig, Chris O'Dowd and Josh Groban
195	13	28 June 2013	Sandra Bullock, Samuel L. Jackson, Nick Frost and Jake Bugg
196	Special	5 July 2013	Compilation Show

=== Series 14 (2013–2014) ===
No. overall	No. in series	Original release date	Guest(s)
197	1	11 October 2013	Harrison Ford, Jack Whitehall, Benedict Cumberbatch and James Blunt
198	2	18 October 2013	Katy Perry, James Corden, Chris Hemsworth, Natalie Portman and Sir Paul McCartney
199	3	25 October 2013	Robert De Niro, Michelle Pfeiffer, Jennifer Saunders and Cher
200	4	1 November 2013	Dame Judi Dench, John Bishop, Jeremy Paxman and Sir Elton John
201	5	8 November 2013	Jude Law, Greg Davies, June Brown and Lady Gaga
202	6	22 November 2013	Emma Thompson, Jimmy Carr, David Tennant, Matt Smith and Robbie Williams feat. Olly Murs
203	7	29 November 2013	Colin Farrell, Sharon Osbourne, Jeremy Clarkson, Jo Brand and Arcade Fire
204	8	6 December 2013	Daniel Radcliffe, Mary Berry, Harry Hill, Sir Andrew Lloyd Webber and Sir Cliff Richard
205	9	13 December 2013	Ben Stiller, Martin Freeman, Jamie Oliver and Rebecca Ferguson
206	10	20 December 2013	Julie Walters, Miranda Hart, Len Goodman and Tinie Tempah feat. Labrinth
207	Special	31 December 2013	New Year's Eve: Will Ferrell, Steve Carell, Christina Applegate, Paul Rudd, David Koechner, Joan Collins, Jackie Collins, Frank Skinner, John Cleese, Terry Jones, Eric Idle, Michael Palin, Terry Gilliam and Michael Bublé
208	Special	3 January 2014	Compilation Show
209	11	10 January 2014	Sylvester Stallone, Robert De Niro, Carey Mulligan, Jonah Hill and Jake Bugg
210	12	17 January 2014	Idris Elba, Lena Dunham, Olivia Colman and Keane
211	13	24 January 2014	Sir Kenneth Branagh, Keira Knightley, Lee Mack, Thierry Henry and Katy B
212	14	31 January 2014	Matthew McConaughey, Julianne Moore, Alan Davies and Sheryl Crow
213	15	7 February 2014	Gary Oldman, Toni Collette, Nick Frost and London Grammar
214	16	14 February 2014	Matt Damon, Bill Murray, Hugh Bonneville and Paloma Faith
215	17	21 February 2014	Dominic Cooper, Miriam Margolyes and Lily Allen
216	18	28 February 2014	Ant & Dec, Jamie Dornan, Aaron Paul, Naomi Campbell and Ellie Goulding

=== Series 15 (2014) ===
No. overall	No. in series	Original release date	Guest(s)
217	1	4 April 2014	Russell Crowe, Cameron Diaz, Richard Ayoade and Kylie Minogue
218	2	11 April 2014	Andrew Garfield, Emma Stone, Jamie Foxx and Paolo Nutini
219	3	18 April 2014	Juliette Binoche, Ronnie Corbett, Ricky Gervais and Imelda May
220	4	25 April 2014	Matt LeBlanc, Seth Rogen, Zac Efron and Kaiser Chiefs
221	5	2 May 2014	Hugh Jackman, Michael Fassbender, James McAvoy and Molly Smitten-Downes
222	6	9 May 2014	Brenda Blethyn, Jean Paul Gaultier, Stephen Mangan and Barry Manilow
223	7	16 May 2014	Kirsten Dunst, Dawn French, Bear Grylls, Conchita Wurst and Sam Smith
224	8	23 May 2014	Dame Julie Andrews, Jonah Hill, Channing Tatum and Pharrell Williams
225	9	30 May 2014	Tom Cruise, Emily Blunt, Charlize Theron, Seth MacFarlane and Coldplay
226	10	6 June 2014	Mark Ruffalo, Amanda Holden, Michael Sheen and Ed Sheeran
227	11	13 June 2014	Samuel L. Jackson, Keira Knightley, Jenson Button (Note: Button was scheduled to appear, but pulled out shortly before the recording after suffering an injury. A phone interview was conducted instead.) and Kasabian
228	12	20 June 2014	Cheryl Cole, Don Johnson, John Bishop, Brendan O'Carroll and Chrissie Hynde
229	Special	27 June 2014	Compilation Show

=== Series 16 (2014–2015) ===
No. overall	No. in series	Original release date	Guest(s)
230	1	26 September 2014	Denzel Washington, Gemma Arterton, Peter Capaldi and George Ezra
231	2	3 October 2014	Hugh Grant, Emma Thompson, Luke Evans and Lenny Kravitz
232	3	10 October 2014	John Cleese, Taylor Swift, Kevin Pietersen and Neil Diamond
233	4	17 October 2014	Robert Duvall, Robert Downey Jr., Stephen Fry and U2
234	5	24 October 2014	Benedict Cumberbatch, Miranda Hart, Timothy Spall and Maroon 5
235	6	31 October 2014	Matthew McConaughey, Anne Hathaway, Lena Dunham, Micky Flanagan and Sia
236	7	7 November 2014	David Walliams, Catherine Tate, Richard Ayoade, Dame Shirley Bassey and Annie Lennox
237	8	21 November 2014	Jennifer Aniston, Jason Bateman, Dame Judi Dench, Dustin Hoffman and Olly Murs
238	9	28 November 2014	Nicole Kidman, Dame Julie Walters, Hugh Bonneville and Take That
239	10	5 December 2014	Michael Keaton, Victoria Wood, Jamie Oliver, Sir Ian McKellen and One Direction
240	11	12 December 2014	Jeff Daniels, Jim Carrey, Jude Law, Tamsin Greig and Nicole Scherzinger
241	12	19 December 2014	Ben Stiller, Ricky Gervais, Rebel Wilson, Jamie Foxx, Cameron Diaz, Danny Dyer and Usher
242	Special	31 December 2014	New Year's Eve Show: Liam Neeson, Anna Kendrick, Eddie Redmayne, Sir Bradley Wiggins and Conchita Wurst
243	13	9 January 2015	Meryl Streep, Mark Ruffalo, James McAvoy and Hozier
244	14	16 January 2015	David Tennant, Olivia Colman, Harvey Weinstein and Jessie J
245	15	23 January 2015	Jessica Chastain, Gary Lineker, Harry Hill, Sir David Attenborough and McBusted
246	16	30 January 2015	Dame Judi Dench, Dev Patel, Sharon Horgan, Rob Delaney, Jack O'Connell and First Aid Kit
247	17	6 February 2015	Julianne Moore, Cuba Gooding, Jr., Bill Bailey, Michael Flatley and Gregory Porter & Laura Mvula
248	18	13 February 2015	Jamie Dornan, Dame Julie Walters, Stephen Mangan and Charli XCX & Rita Ora
249	19	16 February 2015	Adam Woodyatt, Letitia Dean, Kellie Bright, Danny Dyer, June Brown, John Altman, Pam St Clement, Shane Richie and Jessie Wallace (Note: This episode was an EastEnders special, celebrating the programme's 30th anniversary. Other past and present cast members appearing in the episode were Richard Blackwood, Laurie Brett, Hetti Bywater, Natalie Cassidy, Linda Davidson, Matt Di Angelo, Tameka Empson, Dean Gaffney, Nitin Ganatra, Davood Ghadami, Ricky Groves, Ben Hardy, Maddy Hill, Diane Parish, Jane Slaughter and Rudolph Walker.)
250	20	20 February 2015	Sean Penn, Celia Imrie, Ross Noble and Kelly Clarkson
251	21	27 February 2015	Will Smith, Margot Robbie, Hugh Jackman, David Beckham and Noel Gallagher
252	Special	6 March 2015	Comic Relief Special: Jennifer Saunders, David Walliams, Cheryl Fernandez-Versini, Jack Dee and Johnny Vegas (Note: This episode was a Comic Relief special.)
253	22	20 March 2015	Compilation Show

=== Series 17 (2015) ===
No. overall	No. in series	Original release date	Guest(s)
254	1	10 April 2015	Stanley Tucci, Kim Cattrall, Harry Enfield, Paul Whitehouse and Years & Years
255	2	17 April 2015	Carey Mulligan, Noomi Rapace, Amanda Holden and Jessie Ware
256	3	24 April 2015	Mark Ruffalo, Elizabeth Olsen, Jeremy Renner, Josh Widdicombe and Blur
257	4	1 May 2015	Matt LeBlanc, Rebel Wilson, Kit Harington and Mumford & Sons
258	5	8 May 2015	Rupert Everett, Miranda Hart, Greg Davies and Electro Velvet
259	6	15 May 2015	Kylie Minogue, Simon Pegg, Michael McIntyre and Brandon Flowers
260	7	22 May 2015	George Clooney, Britt Robertson, Hugh Laurie, Dwayne Johnson, Jessica Hynes and Snoop Dogg
261	8	29 May 2015	Chris Pratt, Melissa McCarthy, Jude Law, John Bishop and Florence and the Machine
262	9	5 June 2015	Samuel L. Jackson, Amy Schumer, Stephen Merchant and Muse
263	10	12 June 2015	Mark Wahlberg, Seth MacFarlane, Dara Ó Briain and Cyndi Lauper
264	11	19 June 2015	Arnold Schwarzenegger, Emilia Clarke, Jake Gyllenhaal, Cara Delevingne and Tinie Tempah
265	12	26 June 2015	Lewis Hamilton, Ewan McGregor, Jack Whitehall and Rita Ora
266	Special	3 July 2015	Compilation Show

=== Series 18 (2015–2016) ===
No. overall	No. in series	Original release date	Guest(s)
267	1	25 September 2015	Matt Damon, Jessica Chastain, Bill Bailey and The Weeknd
268	2	2 October 2015	Robert De Niro, Anne Hathaway, Sir Kenneth Branagh, Tom Hiddleston and The Shires
269	3	9 October 2015	Meryl Streep, Carey Mulligan, Nicole Kidman, Nigella Lawson and Gabrielle Aplin
270	4	16 October 2015	Colin Farrell, Rachel Weisz, Dawn French, Chris O'Dowd and Sir Rod Stewart
271	5	23 October 2015	Daniel Craig, Naomie Harris, Christoph Waltz and Sam Smith
272	6	30 October 2015	Bradley Cooper, Sienna Miller, Dame Maggie Smith, Alex Jennings and Justin Bieber
273	7	6 November 2015	Kate Winslet, Michael Fassbender, Dame Julie Walters, 50 Cent and Ellie Goulding
274	8	20 November 2015	Tom Hanks, Peter Capaldi, David Walliams and Duran Duran
275	9	27 November 2015	Johnny Depp, Benedict Cumberbatch, James McAvoy, Daniel Radcliffe and The Corrs
276	10	4 December 2015	Lily Tomlin, Chris Hemsworth, Ron Howard, Kevin Bridges and Blake & Dame Shirley Bassey
277	11	11 December 2015	Kurt Russell, Tina Fey, Josh Widdicombe and Sia
278	12	18 December 2015	Carrie Fisher, Daisy Ridley, John Boyega, David Beckham and Kylie Minogue
279	Special	31 December 2015	New Year's Eve Show: Jennifer Lawrence, Eddie Redmayne, Will Ferrell, Mark Wahlberg and Years & Years
280	13	8 January 2016	Ralph Fiennes, Tracey Ullman, James Nesbitt and James Bay
281	14	15 January 2016	Matthew Perry, Miriam Margolyes, Gemma Arterton and Jack Savoretti
282	15	22 January 2016	Ice Cube, Kevin Hart, Olivia Colman, Hugh Laurie, Sir David Attenborough and Elle King
283	16	29 January 2016	Will Smith, Ryan Reynolds, Catherine Zeta-Jones, Toby Jones and Laura Mvula
284	17	5 February 2016	Jack Black, Ben Stiller, Penélope Cruz, Owen Wilson and Sir Elton John
285	18	12 February 2016	Julianne Moore, Ant & Dec, Rebel Wilson and Little Mix feat. Jason Derulo
286	Special	19 February 2016	Compilation Show

=== Series 19 (2016) ===
No. overall	No. in series	Original release date	Guest(s)
287	1	25 March 2016	Ben Affleck, Amy Adams, Henry Cavill and Pet Shop Boys
288	2	1 April 2016	Chris Hemsworth, Jessica Chastain, Kirsten Dunst, Stephen Mangan and Raleigh Ritchie
289	3	8 April 2016	Dame Helen Mirren, Ewan McGregor, Eric Bana, Ricky Gervais, Kevin Costner and Meghan Trainor
290	4	15 April 2016	Meryl Streep, Hugh Grant, Keeley Hawes and Joe and Jake
291	5	22 April 2016	Dame Joan Collins, Richard Madden, Lily James, Paul Hollywood and DNCE
292	6	29 April 2016	Seth Rogen, Paul Rudd, Martin Freeman, Maxine Peake and Birdy
293	7	6 May 2016	Tom Hiddleston, Samuel L. Jackson, John Malkovich, Sara Pascoe and Chvrches
294	8	13 May 2016	Jennifer Lawrence, James McAvoy, Jack Whitehall, Johnny Depp and will.i.am feat. Pia Mia
295	9	20 May 2016	Jodie Foster, Russell Crowe, Ryan Gosling, Greg Davies, Tom Daley and Bright Light Bright Light feat. Sir Elton John
296	10	27 May 2016	Matt LeBlanc, Emilia Clarke, Kate Beckinsale, Dominic Cooper and Corinne Bailey Rae
297	11	3 June 2016	Salma Hayek, Kelsey Grammer, Tamsin Greig, Rhod Gilbert and Alicia Keys
298	12	10 June 2016	Dwayne Johnson, Liam Hemsworth, Jeff Goldblum, Nicola Adams and Tom Odell
299	13	17 June 2016	Charlie Sheen, Melissa McCarthy, Kristen Wiig, Leslie Jones, Kate McKinnon and Christine and the Queens
300	14	24 June 2016	Jennifer Saunders, Joanna Lumley, Rebel Wilson and Josh Homme & Iggy Pop
301	Special	1 July 2016	Compilation Show

=== Series 20 (2016–2017) ===
No. overall	No. in series	Original release date	Guest(s)
302	1	30 September 2016	Justin Timberlake, Anna Kendrick, Daniel Radcliffe and Robbie Williams
303	2	7 October 2016	Ewan McGregor, Sam Neill, Miranda Hart, John Bishop, Danny DeVito and Amber Riley
304	3	14 October 2016	Amy Adams, Jeremy Renner, Chris O'Dowd and Niall Horan
305	4	21 October 2016	Tom Cruise, Cobie Smulders, Jude Law, Catherine Tate and Kings of Leon
306	5	28 October 2016	Benedict Cumberbatch, Eddie Redmayne, Bryan Cranston and LeAnn Rimes
307	6	4 November 2016	Ben Affleck, Claire Foy, Matt Smith, Sir David Attenborough and Sting
308	7	11 November 2016	Rosamund Pike, Michael McIntyre, Andrew Lloyd Webber and Coldplay
309	8	25 November 2016	Tom Hanks, Gemma Arterton, Joseph Gordon-Levitt, Mo Farah and Olly Murs
310	9	2 December 2016	Jennifer Lawrence, Chris Pratt, Jamie Oliver, will.i.am and Emeli Sandé
311	10	9 December 2016	Carrie Fisher, Grayson Perry, Sandi Toksvig, Nadiya Hussain and Busted
312	11	16 December 2016	Nicole Kidman, Dev Patel, Felicity Jones, Dawn French, Sir Michael Parkinson and Jack Savoretti
313	12	23 December 2016	Will Smith, Dame Helen Mirren, Naomie Harris, Martin Freeman and Katie Melua and the Gori Women's Choir
314	Special	31 December 2016	New Year's Eve Show: Michael Fassbender, Marion Cotillard, James McAvoy, Frank Skinner, Gary O'Donovan, Paul O'Donovan and Pete Tong and the Heritage Orchestra
315	Special	6 January 2017	Graham Norton's Big Red Chair
316	13	13 January 2017	Ben Affleck, Sienna Miller, Emma Stone, Ryan Gosling and Gregory Porter
317	14	20 January 2017	Matthew McConaughey, Christina Ricci, Josh Widdicombe and Ed Sheeran
318	15	27 January 2017	Danny Boyle, Ewan McGregor, Jonny Lee Miller, Robert Carlyle, Ewen Bremner and Izzy Bizu
319	16	3 February 2017	Andrew Garfield, Annette Bening, Harriet Harman, Asa Butterfield and Elbow
320	17	10 February 2017	Whoopi Goldberg, Keanu Reeves, Jamie Dornan, Denzel Washington and Rag'n'Bone Man
321	18	17 February 2017	Tom Hiddleston, Ruth Wilson, Ricky Gervais, Daniel Radcliffe, Joshua McGuire and Tinie Tempah
322	19	24 February 2017	Hugh Jackman, Sir Patrick Stewart, Sir Ian McKellen and James Blunt
323	Special	3 March 2017	Compilation Show

=== Series 21 (2017) ===
No. overall	No. in series	Original release date	Guest(s)
324	1	7 April 2017	Sir Michael Caine, Morgan Freeman, Gemma Whelan, Jack Whitehall and Take That
325	2	14 April 2017	Warren Beatty, Keeley Hawes, Miranda Hart, Peter Capaldi and Jennifer Hudson
326	3	21 April 2017	Brendan O'Carroll, Vicky McClure, Rob Brydon and Harry Styles
327	4	28 April 2017	Goldie Hawn, Amy Schumer, Orlando Bloom, John Boyega and Lucie Jones
328	5	5 May 2017	Diane Keaton, Jessica Chastain, Kevin Bacon, Michael Fassbender and Gorillaz feat. Jehnny Beth & Noel Gallagher
329	6	12 May 2017	Charlie Hunnam, Guy Ritchie, Billie Piper, Jason Manford and Imelda May
330	7	19 May 2017	Nicole Kidman, Alan Cumming, Keith Urban feat. Melanie C and Sheryl Crow
331	8	26 May 2017	Salma Hayek, David Walliams, Ed Westwick, James Buckley and Liam Payne
332	9	2 June 2017	Tom Cruise, Annabelle Wallis, Zac Efron and Beth Ditto
333	10	9 June 2017	Rachel Weisz, Anthony Joshua, Greg Davies, Martin Freeman and Shawn Mendes
334	11	16 June 2017	Mark Wahlberg, Sienna Miller, Tom Holland, Woody Harrelson, Andy Serkis and Alison Moyet
335	12	23 June 2017	Dame Judi Dench, Jamie Foxx, Kristen Wiig, Steve Carell and HAIM
336	Special	30 June 2017	Compilation Show

=== Series 22 (2017–2018) ===
No. overall	No. in series	Original release date	Guest(s)
337	1	29 September 2017	Harrison Ford, Ryan Gosling, Reese Witherspoon, Margot Robbie and Bananarama
338	2	6 October 2017	Kate Winslet, Idris Elba, Chris Rock and Liam Gallagher
339	3	13 October 2017	Nicole Kidman, Colin Farrell, Bryan Cranston, Matt Lucas, Jane Fonda and Niall Horan
340	4	20 October 2017	Hillary Clinton, Jeff Goldblum, Gerard Butler, Jack Whitehall and Gregory Porter
341	5	27 October 2017	Emma Thompson, Adam Sandler, Claire Foy, Cara Delevingne and Morrissey
342	6	3 November 2017	Sir Kenneth Branagh, Dame Judi Dench, Johnny Depp, Michelle Pfeiffer, Josh Gad and St. Vincent
343	7	10 November 2017	Hugh Grant, Sarah Millican, Jason Momoa and Kelly Clarkson
344	8	24 November 2017	Will Ferrell, John Lithgow, Mel Gibson, Mark Wahlberg, Shirley Ballas and Kesha
345	9	1 December 2017	Sir Elton John, Carey Mulligan, Stephen Fry, Robbie Williams and Pink
346	10	8 December 2017	Jessica Chastain, Dawn French, Rebel Wilson, Dwayne Johnson, Kevin Hart, Jack Black and Noel Gallagher's High Flying Birds
347	11	15 December 2017	Mark Hamill, Daisy Ridley, John Boyega, Gwendoline Christie and Sam Smith
348	12	22 December 2017	Will Smith, Jenna Coleman, Jamie Oliver and Tom Chaplin
349	Special	31 December 2017	New Year's Eve Show: Hugh Jackman, Zendaya, Zac Efron, Suranne Jones, Gary Oldman and Leading Ladies
350	Special	5 January 2018	Graham Norton's Good Guest Guide (Note: This episode featured interviews from Miriam Margolyes, Jack Whitehall, Ricky Gervais, Dame Joan Collins and Dame Julie Walters.)
351	13	12 January 2018	Tom Hanks, Maisie Williams, Anthony Joshua and First Aid Kit
352	14	19 January 2018	Dame Helen Mirren, Liam Neeson, Jamie Dornan and Sigrid
353	15	26 January 2018	Tom Cruise, Rebecca Ferguson, Henry Cavill, Simon Pegg and Paloma Faith
354	16	2 February 2018	Cuba Gooding Jr., Imelda Staunton, will.i.am and George Ezra
355	17	9 February 2018	Saoirse Ronan, Eric McCormack, Debra Messing, Rob Beckett and Keala Settle
356	18	16 February 2018	Margot Robbie, Allison Janney, Alicia Vikander, Daniel Kaluuya and Camila Cabello
357	Special	23 February 2018	Compilation Show

=== Series 23 (2018) ===
No. overall	No. in series	Original release date	Guest(s)
358	1	6 April 2018	Emily Blunt, John Krasinski, Tom Holland and Kylie Minogue
359	2	13 April 2018	Dwayne Johnson, Naomie Harris, Martin Freeman and Roger Daltrey
360	3	20 April 2018	Benedict Cumberbatch, Maxine Peake, Matt LeBlanc, Mary Berry, Claudia Winkleman and Calvin Harris & Dua Lipa
361	4	27 April 2018	Orlando Bloom, Tamsin Greig, Stephen Merchant and SuRie
362	5	4 May 2018	Stephen Mangan, Emilia Fox, Johnny Vegas and Jess Glynne
363	6	11 May 2018	Ryan Reynolds, Josh Brolin, Vanessa Kirby, David Beckham and Joan Armatrading
364	7	18 May 2018	Gloria Estefan, Emilia Clarke, Phoebe Waller-Bridge, David Tennant and Leon Bridges
365	8	25 May 2018	Chris Pratt, Bryce Dallas Howard, Jeff Goldblum, Thandiwe Newton and Jake Shears
366	9	1 June 2018	Toni Collette, Ethan Hawke, Aidan Turner, Jo Brand and Liam Payne
367	10	8 June 2018	Channing Tatum, Jennifer Saunders, Beattie Edmondson, Rob Brydon, Usain Bolt and Florence and the Machine
368	11	15 June 2018	Sandra Bullock, Cate Blanchett, Sarah Paulson, Rihanna, Helena Bonham Carter and Years & Years
369	12	22 June 2018	Cher, Christine Baranski, Rupert Everett, Natalie Dormer and Tom Odell
370	Special	29 June 2018	Compilation Show

=== Series 24 (2018–2019) ===
No. overall	No. in series	Original release date	Guest(s)
371	1	28 September 2018	Bradley Cooper, Lady Gaga, Ryan Gosling, Jodie Whittaker and Sir Rod Stewart
372	2	5 October 2018	Jamie Lee Curtis, Gary Barlow, Rowan Atkinson and Jeff Goldblum & The Mildred Snitzer Orchestra feat. Imelda May
373	3	12 October 2018	Whoopi Goldberg, Harry Connick Jr., Rosamund Pike, Jamie Dornan and BTS
374	4	19 October 2018	Sally Field, Chris Pine, Rami Malek, Sir Michael Caine and Christine and the Queens
375	5	26 October 2018	Eddie Redmayne, Jude Law, Melissa McCarthy, Emma Stone and Rick Astley
376	6	2 November 2018	Kurt Russell, Claire Foy, David Walliams, Lee Evans and Mumford & Sons
377	7	9 November 2018	Carey Mulligan, Taron Egerton, Sir Ian McKellen and Michael Bublé
378	8	23 November 2018	Nicole Kidman, Stephen Fry, Joe Lycett, Geraint Thomas and Take That
379	9	30 November 2018	Steve Carell, Dawn French, Michael B. Jordan, Ruth Wilson and Cheryl
380	10	7 December 2018	Matthew McConaughey, John Cena, Hailee Steinfeld, Jamie Oliver and Mark Ronson & Miley Cyrus
381	11	14 December 2018	Jason Momoa, Dame Darcey Bussell, Bill Bailey and Little Mix
382	12	21 December 2018	Emily Blunt, Lin-Manuel Miranda, Emily Mortimer, Ben Whishaw and Boy George and Culture Club
383	Special	31 December 2018	New Year's Eve Show: Keira Knightley, Guy Pearce, Catherine Tate, Olivia Colman, Nicholas Hoult and Rita Ora
384	Special	4 January 2019	Graham Norton's Good Story Guide (Note: This episode featured interviews from David Tennant, Bill Bailey, Rob Brydon, Miriam Margolyes and Josh Widdicombe.)
385	13	11 January 2019	James McAvoy, Sarah Paulson, Richard E. Grant, Steve Coogan, John C. Reilly and Westlife
386	14	18 January 2019	Saoirse Ronan, Timothée Chalamet, Laura Linney, Stephen Mangan and The 1975
387	15	25 January 2019	Dame Judi Dench, Sir Kenneth Branagh, Noomi Rapace, Greg Davies, Anthony Joshua and Claire Richards
388	16	1 February 2019	Chris Pratt, Elizabeth Banks, Jennifer Connelly, Paul Whitehouse and Chaka Khan
389	17	8 February 2019	Sir Patrick Stewart, Regina King, Chiwetel Ejiofor, Ricky Gervais and Jack Savoretti
390	18	15 February 2019	Felicity Jones, Armie Hammer, Stephen Merchant, Rob Beckett and Calvin Harris & Rag'n'Bone Man
391	Special	22 February 2019	Compilation Show

=== Series 25 (2019) ===
No. overall	No. in series	Original release date	Guest(s)
392	1	5 April 2019	Sally Field, Bill Pullman, Keeley Hawes, Matt Lucas and The Lumineers
393	2	12 April 2019	Chris Hemsworth, Paul Rudd, Julianne Moore, Kit Harington and Tom Walker
394	3	19 April 2019	Anne Hathaway, Rebel Wilson, Jodie Comer, Daniel Radcliffe and Mabel
395	4	26 April 2019	Charlize Theron, Seth Rogen, Zac Efron, Matthew Broderick and The Specials
396	5	3 May 2019	Keanu Reeves, Suranne Jones, Taron Egerton, Jamie Bell, Kylie Minogue and Michael Rice
397	6	10 May 2019	Will Smith, Naomi Scott, Octavia Spencer, Kevin Hart and Shakespears Sister
398	7	17 May 2019 (Note: Due to Norton's Eurovision commitments, Jack Whitehall hosted this episode.)	Gwendoline Christie, Luke Evans, Peter Crouch, David Walliams and Sam Fender
399	8	24 May 2019	Sophie Turner, Michael Fassbender, Jessica Chastain, James McAvoy and Taylor Swift
400	9	31 May 2019	Chris Hemsworth, David Tennant, Michael Sheen, Gloria Estefan and The Jonas Brothers
401	10	7 June 2019	Stephen Fry, Andrew Scott, Paloma Faith, Lee Mack and Bastille
402	11	14 June 2019	Danny Boyle, Lily James, Himesh Patel, Madonna, Sir Ian McKellen and Sheryl Crow
403	12	21 June 2019	Tom Hanks, Gwyneth Paltrow, Tom Holland, Jake Gyllenhaal and Stormzy
404	Special	28 June 2019	Compilation Show

=== Series 26 (2019–2020) ===
No. overall	No. in series	Original release date	Guest(s)
405	1	27 September 2019	Dame Helen Mirren, RuPaul, Jack Whitehall, Simon Reeve and Alphabeat
406	2	4 October 2019	Renée Zellweger, Sir Lenny Henry, Louis Theroux, Andrew Ridgeley and Elbow
407	3	11 October 2019	Robert De Niro, Sienna Miller, Paul Rudd, Bruce Springsteen and James Blunt
408	4	18 October 2019	Arnold Schwarzenegger, Linda Hamilton, Debbie Harry, Nadiya Hussain and DJ Spoony's Garage Classical feat. The Sugababes
409	5	25 October 2019	Regina King, Emilia Clarke, Ross Noble, Jason Momoa and Camila Cabello
410	6	1 November 2019	Dame Julie Andrews, Jennifer Aniston, Reese Witherspoon, Sir Ian McKellen and Dua Lipa
411	7	8 November 2019	Olivia Colman, Helena Bonham Carter, Chadwick Boseman, Richard Ayoade, Anne, Lady Glenconner and Niall Horan
412	8	22 November 2019	Elizabeth Banks, Ricky Gervais, Lewis Hamilton and Kylie Minogue
413	9	29 November 2019	Hillary Clinton, Chelsea Clinton, Jamie Oliver, David Mitchell and Kesha
414	10	6 December 2019	Dwayne Johnson, Kevin Hart, Jodie Whittaker, Sir Michael Palin and Harry Styles
415	11	13 December 2019	Dame Judi Dench, Jennifer Hudson, Matthew McConaughey, Hugh Grant, Michael Bublé and Coldplay
416	12	20 December 2019	Henry Cavill, Ruth Jones, Rob Brydon, Daisy Ridley and Robbie Williams
417	Special	31 December 2019	New Year's Eve Show: Tom Hanks, Matthew Rhys, Motsi Mabuse, Florence Pugh, Stephen Graham, Anthony Joshua and Melanie C feat. Sink the Pink
418	Special	3 January 2020	Graham Norton's Good Show Business Guide (Note: This episode featured interviews from Stanley Tucci, Stephen Merchant, Sandi Toksvig, Richard Ayoade and Alan Davies.)
419	13	10 January 2020	Miriam Margolyes, Daniel Radcliffe, Alan Cumming, Sharon Horgan and Craig David
420	14	17 January 2020	Sir Patrick Stewart, Michael B. Jordan, Jamie Foxx, Jennifer Saunders and Michael Kiwanuka
421	15	24 January 2020	Robert Downey Jr., Dame Emma Thompson, Hugh Laurie, Terry Gilliam and Sara Bareilles
422	16	31 January 2020	Margot Robbie, Daniel Kaluuya, Jodie Turner-Smith, Jim Carrey and Lewis Capaldi
423	17	7 February 2020	Mark Ruffalo, David Schwimmer, Nick Mohammed, Tamsin Greig and Alicia Keys
424	18	14 February 2020	Justin Timberlake, Anna Kendrick, Oti Mabuse, Alan Carr and Sam Smith
425	Special	21 February 2020	Compilation Show

=== Series 27 (2020) ===
This series was recorded remotely from the guests' homes with no studio audience due to the COVID-19 pandemic.

No. overall	No. in series	Original release date	Guest(s)
426	1	10 April 2020	Michael Bublé, Martin Freeman, Daisy Haggard, Michael Sheen, Dame Judi Dench (Note: Dench appeared via telephone, during Sheen's interview as Norton's Phone A Friend.) and Celeste
427	2	17 April 2020	Sir Patrick Stewart, Sunny Ozell, Thandiwe Newton, Ricky Gervais and Christine and the Queens
428	3	24 April 2020	Phoebe Waller-Bridge, Richard E. Grant, Joe Lycett, Chris Hemsworth and Jessie Ware
429	4	1 May 2020	Jeff Goldblum, Imelda Staunton, Jim Carter, Louis Theroux, Lior Suchard and Mabel
430	5	8 May 2020	Stanley Tucci, Sandra Oh, Rob Beckett, Romesh Ranganathan, Oti Mabuse and Marius Iepure
431	6	15 May 2020	Miranda Hart, Mark Ruffalo, Paul Mescal, Daisy Edgar-Jones, Will Ferrell and Billy Porter
432	7	22 May 2020	Katy Perry, Alan Carr, Dakota Johnson, Steve Carell and John Legend
433	8	29 May 2020	Lady Gaga, Josh Gad, Michaela Coel, Michelle Dockery, Chris Evans and Niall Horan
434	Special	5 June 2020	Compilation Show

=== Series 28 (2020–2021) ===
No. overall	No. in series	Original release date	Guest(s)
435	1	2 October 2020	Lolly Adefope, Rupert Everett, Sara Pascoe, Dolly Parton, Riz Ahmed and Róisín Murphy
436	2	9 October 2020	Ashley Banjo, Shirley Ballas, Frank Skinner, Ewan McGregor and Miley Cyrus
437	3	16 October 2020	Freddie Flintoff, Arsène Wenger, Dawn French, Samuel L. Jackson, LaTanya Richardson Jackson and Michael Kiwanuka
438	4	23 October 2020	Mawaan Rizwan, Dame Kristin Scott Thomas, Stephen Mangan, Bruce Springsteen, Matthew McConaughey and Sam Smith
439	5	30 October 2020	Frank Gardner, Jessie Buckley, David Walliams, Bill Bailey, Octavia Spencer and Dermot Kennedy
440	6	6 November 2020	Nicola Adams, Josh O'Connor, Emma Corrin, Nicole Kidman, Jason Manford and Kylie Minogue
441	7	20 November 2020	Nigella Lawson, Hugh Grant, Romesh Ranganathan, Tina Fey, Amy Adams and Dua Lipa
442	8	27 November 2020	Tim Peake, Nadiya Hussain, Richard Osman, Mariah Carey and Gary Barlow
443	9	4 December 2020	Nina Sosanya, Stephen Fry, Tom Allen, Jamie Oliver, Amanda Seyfried, Michael J. Fox and Dolly Parton
444	10	11 December 2020	Nicola Coughlan, Jennifer Saunders, Lee Mack, Claudia Winkleman, Gal Gadot, Tessa Thompson and McFly
445	11	18 December 2020	Michael Sheen, David Tennant, Daisy May Cooper, Vanessa Kirby, George Clooney, Viola Davis and Michael Ball & Alfie Boe
446	Special	31 December 2020	New Year's Eve Show: Jamie Dornan, Emily Blunt, Nish Kumar, Hugh Fearnley-Whittingstall, Jessica Chastain, Tom Hanks and Sophie Ellis-Bextor
447	12	8 January 2021	Olly Alexander, David Mitchell, Mel Giedroyc, Anya Taylor-Joy, Jimmy Fallon, Regina King and Yungblud
448	13	15 January 2021	Daniel Sloss, Keeley Hawes, Noel Clarke, Rebel Wilson, Ant Middleton, M. Night Shyamalan and Jake Bugg
449	14	22 January 2021	James Norton, Carey Mulligan, Ian Wright, Neil Patrick Harris, Camille Cottin and Celeste
450	15	29 January 2021	Andi Osho, Billie Piper, James Nesbitt, Sam Neill and Sir Tom Jones
451	16	5 February 2021	Alan Carr, Felicity Kendal, Regé-Jean Page, Siobhán McSweeney, Dave Grohl and Jessie Ware
452	17	12 February 2021	Adrian Lester, Sienna Miller, Rachel Parris, Marcus Brigstocke, Daniel Kaluuya, Mayim Bialik and Arlo Parks
453	18	19 February 2021	Judi Love, Gordon Ramsay, Gareth Thomas, Rosamund Pike, Hugh Bonneville and Ella Henderson & Tom Grennan
454	19	26 February 2021	Kingsley Ben-Adir, Stanley Tucci, Aisling Bea, Kate Winslet, Orlando Bloom and Silk City feat. Ellie Goulding
455	20	5 March 2021	Vicky McClure, Adrian Dunbar, Daisy Ridley, Chiwetel Ejiofor, Bryan Cranston and Imelda May feat. Shola Mos-Shogbamimu & Gina Martin
456	21	12 March 2021	Leonie Elliott, Nick Jonas, Rob Beckett, Amy Poehler, Jennifer Garner and Tom Odell
457	22	26 March 2021	Cush Jumbo, Deborah Meaden, Rob Brydon, Tahar Rahim, Micheál Richardson, Liam Neeson and Laura Mvula
458	23	2 April 2021	Nick Mohammed, Frank Skinner, David Schwimmer, Octavia Spencer, Melissa McCarthy and Michelle Visage & Steps
459	24	16 April 2021 (Note: This episode was postponed due to the death of Prince Philip, Duke of Edinburgh.)	Felicity Jones, Tom Cruise, John Bishop, Wunmi Mosaku, Miles Teller, Jennifer Connelly and Years & Years
460	Special	23 April 2021	Compilation Show 1
461	Special	30 April 2021	Compilation Show 2

=== Series 29 (2021–2022) ===
No. overall	No. in series	Original release date	Guest(s)
462	1	24 September 2021	Daniel Craig, Lea Seydoux, Lashana Lynch, Rami Malek and Ed Sheeran
463	2	1 October 2021	Dave Grohl, Kadeena Cox, Sophie Ellis-Bextor, Greg Davies and Jack Savoretti & Nile Rodgers
464	3	8 October 2021	Andie MacDowell, Jodie Comer, Billy Porter, Daisy Haggard and Texas
465	4	15 October 2021	Jodie Whittaker, Dame Eileen Atkins, Tom Daley, Sir Lenny Henry, Sir Billy Connolly and Coldplay
466	5	22 October 2021	Eddie Redmayne, Jessie Buckley, Motsi Mabuse, Stephen Merchant, Sir Ian McKellen and Sir Elton John & Charlie Puth
467	6	29 October 2021	Dame Judi Dench, Jamie Dornan, Salma Hayek, Tinie, Barack Obama, Bruce Springsteen and Jesy Nelson
468	7	5 November 2021	Paul Rudd, Miriam Margolyes, Ron Howard, Stephen Fry, Halle Berry and Gregory Porter
469	8	12 November 2021	Lady Gaga, Adam Driver, Nadiya Hussain, Josh Gad and Sir Rod Stewart
470	9	26 November 2021	Will Smith, Richard Osman, Chris & Rosie Ramsey, Lin-Manuel Miranda and Yola
471	10	3 December 2021	Henry Cavill, Tom Holland, Zendaya, Gugu Mbatha-Raw and Little Mix
472	11	10 December 2021	Olivia Colman, Cynthia Erivo, Jack Whitehall, Keanu Reeves and Rag'n'Bone Man
473	12	17 December 2021	Dame Joan Collins, Stanley Tucci, Jamie Oliver, Romesh Ranganathan and Joy Crookes
474	Special	31 December 2021	New Year's Eve Show: Claire Foy, Peter Dinklage, Michael Sheen, Cush Jumbo, Joe Lycett, Jessica Chastain and The Divine Comedy
475	13	7 January 2022	Martin Freeman, Nina Sosanya, Josh Widdicombe, Denzel Washington and James Morrison
476	14	14 January 2022	Cate Blanchett, Ant & Dec, Ricky Gervais and Elvis Costello & The Imposters
477	15	21 January 2022	Sir Kenneth Branagh, Vicky McClure, Rachel Zegler, Rose Matafeo and Emeli Sandé
478	16	28 January 2022	Pedro Almodóvar, James McAvoy, Nicôle Lecky, Penélope Cruz and Ella Henderson
479	17	4 February 2022	Courteney Cox, Minnie Driver, Taron Egerton, Ariana DeBose, Uma Thurman and Lola Young
480	18	11 February 2022	Adele, Dame Helen Mirren, Jim Broadbent, Golda Rosheuvel and George Ezra
481	19	18 February 2022	Andrew Garfield, Dawn French, Johannes Radebe, Rob Beckett, Channing Tatum and Natalie Imbruglia
482	20	25 February 2022	Benedict Cumberbatch, RuPaul, Daisy Edgar-Jones, Diane Morgan and Regard x Years & Years
483	Special	4 March 2022	Compilation Show 1
484	Special	11 March 2022	Compilation Show 2

=== Series 30 (2022–2023) ===
No. overall	No. in series	Original release date	Guest(s)
485	1	30 September 2022	Jamie Lee Curtis, Lydia West, David Tennant, Eric Idle and Robbie Williams
486	2	7 October 2022	Hugh Bonneville, Lesley Manville, Lashana Lynch, Big Zuu and Sam Ryder
487	3	14 October 2022	Kate Hudson, Edward Enninful, Elizabeth Banks, Brendan Gleeson, Colin Farrell and Self Esteem
488	4	21 October 2022	Geena Davis, Stephen Graham, Motsi Mabuse and Stormzy
489	5	28 October 2022	Bono, Taylor Swift, Eddie Redmayne, Alex Scott and Lady Blackbird
490	6	4 November 2022	Paul Mescal, Emma Corrin, Richard Ayoade, Winston Duke, Michaela Coel and Loyle Carner
491	7	11 November 2022	Bruce Springsteen, Anya Taylor-Joy, Anna Maxwell Martin, Mo Gilligan and Florence and the Machine
492	8	25 November 2022	Daniel Craig, Fleur East, Clive Myrie, Sir Ian McKellen, John Bishop and Charlie Puth
493	9	2 December 2022	Dame Kristin Scott Thomas, George Takei, Claudia Winkleman, Jamie Oliver and First Aid Kit
494	10	9 December 2022	Kate Winslet, Sir Lenny Henry, Nadiya Hussain, Jack Whitehall and Olly Murs
495	11	16 December 2022	Tom Hanks, Suranne Jones, Naomi Ackie, Richard Osman and Rina Sawayama
496	Special	31 December 2022	New Year's Eve Show: Olivia Colman, Micheal Ward, Hugh Laurie, Romesh Ranganathan, Leah Williamson and Callum Scott Howells & Madeline Brewer
497	12	6 January 2023	Jamie Dornan, Sophie Okonedo, James Norton, Siobhán McSweeney and Lewis Capaldi
498	13	13 January 2023	Cate Blanchett, Margot Robbie, Beverley Knight, Alan Carr and Raye
499	14	20 January 2023	Michelle Williams, Helena Bonham Carter, Russell T Davies, Oti Mabuse, Brendan Fraser and Cat Burns
500	15	27 January 2023	Claire Foy, Sarah Michelle Gellar, M. Night Shyamalan, Rob Beckett and Sam Smith
501	16	3 February 2023	Michelle Yeoh, Austin Butler, Jack Lowden, Ashley Banjo and Mimi Webb
502	17	10 February 2023	Salma Hayek Pinault, Shania Twain, Julianne Moore, Johannes Radebe, Lizzo and Tom Grennan
503	18	17 February 2023	Dame Judi Dench, Hugh Jackman, Michael B. Jordan, Eugene Levy, Paul Rudd, Michael Douglas and Pink
504	19	24 February 2023	Dame Helen Mirren, Pedro Pascal, Ariana DeBose and Freya Ridings
505	20	3 March 2023	Compilation Show 1
506	21	10 March 2023	Compilation Show 2

=== Series 31 (2023–2024) ===
No. overall	No. in series	Original release date	Guest(s)
507	1	29 September 2023	Kylie Minogue, Stephen Graham, David Mitchell, Mawaan Rizwan and Mae Muller
508	2	6 October 2023	Bernie Taupin, Catherine Tate, Ashley Walters, Bill Bailey and Christine and the Queens
509	3	13 October 2023	Laura Linney, Dawn French, Adrian Edmondson, London Hughes and the Sugababes
510	4	20 October 2023	Sir Patrick Stewart, Ralph Fiennes, Bella Ramsey, Layton Williams, Dame Joan Collins and Zak Abel
511	5	27 October 2023	Arnold Schwarzenegger, Dame Judi Dench, Jay Blades, Jack Whitehall and Duran Duran
512	6	3 November 2023	Sarah Snook, Miriam Margolyes, Greta Lee, Boy George and CMAT
513	7	10 November 2023	Sean "Diddy" Combs, Ashley Jensen, George MacKay, Chris & Rosie Ramsey and Jessie Ware
514	8	24 November 2023	Michael Fassbender, Jennifer Saunders, Daisy Haggard, Phil Wang and Take That
515	9	1 December 2023	Julia Roberts, Tom Hanks, Timothée Chalamet and Cher
516	10	8 December 2023	Julianne Moore, Paapa Essiedu, Jamie Oliver, Ricky Gervais and Olivia Dean
517	11	15 December 2023	Imelda Staunton, Jamie Dornan, Jack Lowden, Ncuti Gatwa and Gregory Porter
518	Special	31 December 2023	New Year's Eve Show: Emma Stone, Mark Ruffalo, Claudia Winkleman, Rob Brydon and Ezra Collective
519	12	5 January 2024	Dominic West, Michelle Keegan, Jacob Anderson, Alan Carr and Teddy Swims
520	13	12 January 2024	Kevin Hart, Sofía Vergara, Jodie Comer, Alan Cumming and Tom Odell
521	14	19 January 2024	Andrew Scott, Paul Mescal, Da'Vine Joy Randolph, Kingsley Ben-Adir and The Last Dinner Party
522	15	26 January 2024	Bryce Dallas Howard, Bryan Cranston, Daniel Kaluuya, Kevin Bridges, Bradley Cooper, Carey Mulligan and Elbow
523	16	2 February 2024	Sterling K. Brown, Dakota Johnson, Colman Domingo, Domhnall Gleeson and Paul Russell
524	17	9 February 2024	Sir Ian McKellen, Michael Sheen, Ambika Mod, Josh Widdicombe and Gabrielle
525	18	16 February 2024	Jodie Foster, Olivia Colman, Lorraine Kelly, Wanda Sykes, Austin Butler, Josh Brolin and Calvin Harris & Rag'n'Bone Man
526	19	23 February 2024	Kate Winslet, Cate Blanchett, Dua Lipa, Adrian Lester and Justin Timberlake
527	20	8 March 2024	Compilation Show 1
528	21	22 March 2024	Compilation Show 2

=== Series 32 (2024–2025) ===
No. overall	No. in series	Original release date	Guest(s)
529	1	27 September 2024	Lady Gaga, Demi Moore, Colin Farrell, Richard Ayoade and Jack Savoretti & Miles Kane
530	2	4 October 2024	Hugh Grant, Neneh Cherry, Sebastian Stan, Greg Davies and Perrie
531	3	11 October 2024	Zoe Saldaña, Selena Gomez, Ncuti Gatwa, Miranda Hart, Kevin Kline and Rag'n'Bone Man
532	4	18 October 2024	Bruce Springsteen, Amy Adams, Vanessa Williams, Bill Bailey and St. Vincent
533	5	25 October 2024	Paul Mescal, Denzel Washington, Saoirse Ronan, Eddie Redmayne and Blossoms
534	6	1 November 2024	Billy Crystal, Emily Mortimer, Hugh Bonneville, Pharrell Williams and Michael Kiwanuka
535	7	8 November 2024	Dwayne Johnson, Lucy Liu, Kate Winslet, Jennifer Lopez, Jharrel Jerome and Celeste
536	8	22 November 2024	Nicole Kidman, Cynthia Erivo, James Norton, Chris McCausland and Benson Boone
537	9	29 November 2024	Cher, Michael Fassbender, Keira Knightley, Josh Brolin and Jalen Ngonda
538	10	6 December 2024	Sigourney Weaver, Nicholas Hoult, Lolly Adefope, Jamie Oliver and Coldplay
539	11	13 December 2024	Daniel Craig, Nicola Coughlan, Jesse Eisenberg, Kieran Culkin and FLO
540	12	20 December 2024	Timothée Chalamet, Colman Domingo, Andrew Garfield, Ruth Jones, James Corden and Laufey
541	Special	31 December 2024	New Year's Eve Show: Rami Malek, Motsi Mabuse, John Bishop and Robbie Williams
542	13	10 January 2025	Tom Hiddleston, Brie Larson, Billy Porter, Claudia Winkleman and Myles Smith
543	14	17 January 2025	Jamie Foxx, Cameron Diaz, Michelle Yeoh, Jonathan Bailey and Griff
544	15	24 January 2025	Will Ferrell, Reese Witherspoon, Ariana Grande, Don Gilet and Olly Alexander
545	16	31 January 2025	Renée Zellweger, Leo Woodall, Sterling K. Brown, Anthony Mackie, Cyndi Lauper and Lola Young
546	17	7 February 2025	Mikey Madison, Holly Willoughby, Alan Carr, Robert De Niro and Sir Elton John & Brandi Carlile
547	18	14 February 2025	Pamela Anderson, Stephen Graham, Gugu Mbatha-Raw, Sean Hayes, Ross Kemp and Gracie Abrams
548	19	21 February 2025	Ewan McGregor, Kate Hudson, Naomie Harris, Chris O'Dowd and Self Esteem
549	20	28 February 2025 (Note: Due to Norton's Australian tour commitments, Claudia Winkleman hosted this episode.)	Chris Pratt, Saoirse-Monica Jackson, Toby Jones, Rob Beckett and Rachel Chinouriri
550	21	7 March 2025	Compilation Show

=== Series 33 (2025–2026) ===
No. overall	No. in series	Original release date	Guest(s)
551	1	26 September 2025	Dwayne Johnson, Emily Blunt, Matthew McConaughey, James Norton and Raye
552	2	3 October 2025	Taylor Swift, Cillian Murphy, Greta Lee, Jodie Turner-Smith, Domhnall Gleeson and Lewis Capaldi
553	3	10 October 2025	Julia Roberts, Colin Farrell, Benedict Cumberbatch, Gloria Estefan and Robbie Williams
554	4	17 October 2025	Bruce Springsteen, Jeremy Allen White, Jennifer Lawrence, Tessa Thompson and Florence and the Machine
555	5	24 October 2025	Kim Kardashian, Sarah Paulson, Rachel Zegler, Bryan Cranston and Little Simz feat. Obongjayar
556	6	31 October 2025	Keira Knightley, Malala Yousafzai, Aimee Lou Wood, Chris McCausland and Mumford & Sons with Hozier
557	7	7 November 2025	Glen Powell, Michelle Yeoh, Rosamund Pike, Jack Whitehall and Ed Sheeran
558	8	21 November 2025	Hugh Jackman, Kate Hudson, Ben Stiller, Da'Vine Joy Randolph and Sombr
559	9	28 November 2025	Glenn Close, Alexander Skarsgård, Miriam Margolyes, Nicola Coughlan and Jessie J
560	10	5 December 2025	Kate Winslet, Dame Jacinda Ardern, Seth Meyers, Alan Carr and Cat Burns
561	11	12 December 2025	Dame Emma Thompson, Timothée Chalamet, Rowan Atkinson, Edward Enninful and JADE
562	12	19 December 2025	Paul Rudd, Jack Black, Jessie Buckley, Michelle de Swarte and Tom Odell
563	Special	31 December 2025	New Year’s Eve Show: Laura Dern, Will Arnett, Tom Hiddleston, Carey Mulligan, Tim Key, Owen Cooper and Alison Limerick
564	13	9 January 2026	Chris Pratt, Cynthia Erivo, Dawn French, Rob Beckett and Jack Savoretti
565	14	16 January 2026	Sir Idris Elba, Erin Doherty, Wunmi Mosaku, Martin Freeman and Olivia Dean
566	15	23 January 2026	Ant & Dec, Claire Foy, Joe Keery and Tinie Tempah feat. Alex Mills & Jeremiah Asiamah
567	16	30 January 2026	Chris Hemsworth, Halle Berry, Rachel McAdams, John Bishop and Jessie Ware
568	17	6 February 2026	Margot Robbie, Jacob Elordi, Amanda Seyfried, Johannes Radebe and Jacob Alon
569	18	13 February 2026	Stephen Graham, Kaley Cuoco, Adrian Lester, Leo Woodall and Gorillaz feat. Kara Jackson & Anoushka Shankar
570	19	20 February 2026	Benicio del Toro, Jennifer Garner, Charli XCX, Gordon Ramsay and Foo Fighters
571	20	27 February 2026	Compilation Show 1
572	21	6 March 2026	Compilation Show 2

=== Series 34 (2026–2027) ===
No. overall	No. in series	Original release date	Guest(s)
573	1	25 September 2026	Tom Cruise, Florence Pugh, Lolly Adefope, John Bishop and Emeli Sandé
574	2	2 October 2026	Sylvester Stallone, Catherine Zeta-Jones, Andrew Garfield and Blossoms
575	3	9 October 2026	Olivia Colman, Alexander Skarsgård, John Malkovich, Ayo Edebiri and Orville Peck
576	4	16 October 2026	Quentin Tarantino, Colin Farrell, Gemma Chan, Ellen DeGeneres and Suede
577	5	23 October 2026	Cate Blanchett, Hannah Waddingham, Robert Irwin, HRH The Prince of Wales and Jorja Smith
578	6	30 October 2026	Michael Douglas, Glenn Close, Kieran Culkin, Naomi Ackie and Sugababes
579	7	6 November 2026	Dame Judi Dench, Alan Cumming, Nicola Coughlan, Tramell Tillman and James Blunt
580	8	13 November 2026	Cynthia Erivo, David Tennant, Laura Linney, Rob Brydon and Noah Kahan
581	9	20 November 2026	Robert De Niro, Ben Stiller, Michelle Yeoh, Jamie Oliver and Take That
582	10	27 November 2026	Jack Lowden, Jack Whitehall and Sienna Spiro
583	11	4 December 2026	Danny Boyle, Miranda Hart and Ashe
584	12	11 December 2026	Harry Kane, Timothée Chalamet, Paul Rudd, Pedro Pascal, Katherine Parkinson and Paloma Faith
