= The Graham Norton Show =

British comedy chat show, broadcast on BBC One

- Genre: Comedy; Talk show
- Directed by: Steve Smith
- Presented by: Graham Norton
- Country of origin: United Kingdom
- Original language: English
- No. of series: 34
- No. of episodes: 572+1 pilot (list of episodes)

Production
- Executive producer: Graham Stuart
- Producer: Jon Magnusson
- Production locations: The London Studios (2007–2018); Television Centre (2018–present)
- Running time: 50 minutes
- Production company: So Television

Original release
- Network: BBC Two (2007–09); BBC One (2009–present)
- Release: 22 February 2007 – present

Related
- So Graham Norton (1998–2002); V Graham Norton (2002–03); The Graham Norton Effect (2004); Graham Norton's Bigger Picture (2005–06)

The Graham Norton Show is a British comedy talk show presented by Graham Norton. It was initially broadcast on BBC Two, from 22 February 2007, before moving to BBC One in October 2009. It currently airs on Friday evenings, with Norton succeeding Friday Night with Jonathan Ross in BBC One's prestigious late-Friday-evening slot in 2010.

The show is characterised by Norton's opening monologue, adult humour, and innuendo-laden dialogue and flamboyant presentation, for which he has received a number of awards, including the British Academy Television Award for Best Entertainment Performance three times (2011, 2012 and 2018). The show also won the British Academy Television Award for Best Comedy Entertainment Programme in 2015.

== History ==
=== BBC Two ===
The show mirrors So and V with strong adult humour along with Norton's monologue at the beginning of the show and often a musical guest to play out over the credits. Although the rude objects in "Graham's drawer" did not survive, the phone calls and hidden camera surprises have. These surprises are sometimes centred on the guests, such as Sarah Beeny's dating website, a TARDIS on the South Bank when David Tennant appeared and a wine-tasting group drinking Gérard Depardieu's wine whilst he was on the show. Some of the surprises, such as the wine-tasting, have been arranged through ideas submitted by viewers, stating where they will be when the show is recorded.

At the end of the show, after any band or artist performance, an extra five minute section of the show was recorded, known as the "Cooldown". This section was seen in an extended weekend repeat, called Graham Norton Uncut, and was also made available as a downloadable podcast. As well as showing the "Cooldown", it also included previously unseen parts from the original episode. This section often involved the audience, such as guessing an audience member's partner or playing mass charades.

After Norton's short monologue, he always introduced two guests. If there was a third guest, they were usually introduced later in the show. If the two guests are connected in some way (for example, Dustin Hoffman and his wife), they were the only ones introduced at the start. If musical guests were involved in the show, one of several things happened. Some performers, such as Enrique Iglesias, were on stage from the very beginning. Others, such as Gareth Gates came on stage about 5 to 7 minutes before their performance for a short interview. Also, some musical guests only performed during the end credits and participated in the Cooldown section of the programme. However, all bands performed during the credits and were interviewed in the Cooldown segment.

=== BBC One ===
Once the show moved to BBC One, it moved to Monday nights and the guest list increased to three or occasionally four people with an accompanying reduction in Norton's signature pieces. A typical show consisted of one big celebrity name, a comedian sitting in the aforementioned comedy chair and a well-known musical personality who would all be introduced after the monologue. Sometimes, three guests are introduced at the top of the show with the musical guest brought in about 10 to 15 minutes before the end of the show.

Unlike the BBC Two show, the BBC One show does not end with the musical performance, but with a new audience participation segment called That's All We've Got Time For, where audience members sit in the famous red chair and begin to tell a humorous story. Norton and his guests listen to the stories and if Norton gets bored, he – or occasionally a guest – pulls the lever and the chair falls backwards, dumping the speaker from it. The red chair segment was inspired by comedian Ronnie Corbett's long-winded armchair monologues.

Following the end of Friday Night with Jonathan Ross, it was announced that The Graham Norton Show would be taking over the coveted Friday night slot. The show premiered on 22 October 2010.

== Series ==
The first series began at 10 pm on 22 February 2007 on BBC Two and was originally slated to end on 24 May 2007 after 13 episodes. However, the series proved such a hit that it was extended for an additional six episodes. A 12-week second series began on 11 October 2007 and culminated with a Boxing Day special and a New Year's compilation from previous episodes.

The show made its North American premiere on BBC America on 2 June 2007, one week after what was supposed to be the final episode of series 1 (before its extension).

Series 2 premiered on BBC America on 20 October 2007. Unlike the previous series, each episode premiered in the United States only nine days after its initial UK broadcast. However, the final three episodes were broadcast in reverse order (with Episode 12 being shown on BBC America a few days earlier than on BBC Two. The same thing occurred in Series 4 with the Christmas special airing on BBC America, 10 days before the BBC Two broadcast.

Series 3 began its run on 17 April 2008. For series 3, the "Cooldown" segment had been dropped and the show was just the full uncut 45-minute version.

The show continued to be broadcast in a 30-minute version on Thursdays at 10:00 pm with Graham Norton Uncut, the uncut version, shown on Sundays at 11:00 pm in a 45-minute version. However, BBC Two in Wales sometimes would broadcast the Thursday edition later than the rest of the BBC Two regions, usually after Newsnight at 11.20 pm because they would usually have local programmes in the 10 pm slot. BBC Two Northern Ireland did the same and during series three, they broadcast Thursday's show on Friday nights at 10 pm on BBC Two Northern Ireland because of local programming on Thursdays.

Series 4 began its run on 3 October 2008 at 10:00 pm on BBC Two (however, both BBC Two Wales and BBC Two Northern Ireland broadcast the show at a later time due to their regional programming). The Sunday uncut editions have been kept, with the first uncut edition broadcast on BBC Two late on Sunday night.

Since its sixth series, The Graham Norton Show has aired on BBC One.

In late January 2017, it was confirmed that Norton had signed a new three-year deal with the BBC which, along with his BBC Radio 2 show, Eurovision Song Contest commentary duties and other projects for the BBC, would also keep The Graham Norton Show on BBC One until at least 2020. Norton said: "I think we've just done a deal for another three years, which, right now, feels like a long time."

The Graham Norton Show had been produced from the ITV Studios on London's Southbank since it began in 2007. Norton had used the London Studios since 1998 for his first talk show on Channel 4, So Graham Norton. The show produced its final episode from The London Studios on Thursday 15 February 2018 which aired on BBC One on Friday 16 February 2018. At the end of the final show, a photograph was taken of all the crew on the sofa along with Norton with a caption reading "Love, thanks and goodbye to The London Studios". The production of the show moved to Studio TC1 at BBC Television Centre in West London, operated by BBC Studioworks. The first edition to be recorded at Television Centre was on Thursday 5 April 2018, which aired on BBC One on Friday 6 April 2018.

Series 27, which began on 10 April 2020, adopted a slightly different format due to the continuing global coronavirus pandemic. Initially airing in an earlier timeslot of 9:00 pm and its running time reduced to 30 minutes, the programme was presented by Norton from his own home chatting to guests via video link. After four episodes, the show returned to its 10:35 pm timeslot.

Series 28, which began on 2 October 2020, saw the programme return to the studio, albeit with some layout changes to allow Norton and the studio guests to observe social distancing. Each guest had their own chair positioned 2 metres apart from each other with Norton sat in the middle of the semi-circular layout. Guests who are based abroad continued to join in remotely via video link and a reduced capacity audience, wearing face coverings, were allowed to attend the recordings. From the sixth episode onwards, the studio audience was replaced by a virtual audience, due to the UK entering a new national lockdown. From this series onwards, one series would be aired instead of two.

Series 30, which began on 30 September 2022, saw the return of the big red sofa with all guests sitting closer together. However, the larger screen remains to beam in virtual guests.

The programme is currently taping at Television Centre, London.

== International broadcasts ==
Across Scandinavia, The Graham Norton Show is frequently shown on cable and satellite channels BBC Brit, formerly known as BBC Entertainment. Episodes are usually shown a week after their original UK airing on BBC One, while reruns from past seasons are shown overnight or during the day. Swedish state television SVT streams the show with a delay of several weeks on its VOD service SVT Play.

In Greece, the show is broadcast on Cosmote Series HD which is a pay channel available on Cosmote TV. The episodes are shown in English with Greek subtitles and are broadcast a few days after the UK.

In Latin America, Poland and several countries in continental Europe, The Graham Norton Show is aired on satellite channel BBC Entertainment. Episodes are usually shown a week after their original UK airing on BBC One, while reruns from past series are shown overnight or during daytime.

In the United States, the show began airing on Saturday nights in June 2007. Starting 11 April 2013, cable/satellite network BBC America aired new episodes on Thursdays. From 2014 to 2015, it then aired every Saturday night on BBC America, normally eight days after the BBC. In November 2015, The Weinstein Company bought the series rights in the United States and took a break while negotiating a new contract with BBC America. On 18 January 2016, BBC America aired the 2015 New Year's Eve episode. On 21 January 2016, the network announced that the programme would be returning on Monday, 25 January 2016, with new episodes now airing three days after the BBC airing. In 2017, the series moved back to its original Saturday time slot. In 2018, the show moved to a Friday night time slot, which airs new episodes a week after the BBC airing. This is now on Thursday nights, six days after the UK airing.

In Canada, it is broadcast by BBC First.

In Ireland, the show was broadcast on TV3 and its sister channel 3e one day after the BBC broadcast on Saturdays. In January 2015, UTV Ireland aired the show every Sunday night. TV3 Group continued to air "Best of" Specials recorded prior to 2015. This arrangement changed in January 2017 when the TV3 Group bought UTV Ireland and changed it to "be3". TV3 then moved The Graham Norton Show back to their main channel, where it aired every Saturday, 24 hours after UK transmission, usually at around 10.pm. In August 2018, TV3 rebranded to become Virgin Media One, with The Graham Norton Show remaining on the channel.

In Australia, the series is broadcast on Network 10 on Friday nights, airing one week after the original broadcast in the UK. Additionally, for Pay TV viewers (Foxtel), it airs on UKTV at 9.30pm Mondays, with repeats on Tuesdays and Saturdays. It previously aired on ABC2 on Thursdays from 2007 to 2012.

In New Zealand, the show was originally broadcast on UKTV. Since the start of Series 11 on 4 May 2012, the show has been broadcast on TV3 on Friday nights.

In India, Pakistan, Bangladesh, Sri Lanka, Nepal, Bhutan and Maldives, The Graham Norton Show airs Saturday nights on Comedy Central a week after the BBC broadcast.

In Croatia, the series is titled Graham Norton i gosti (English: Graham Norton and guests) and broadcasts Saturdays on HRT 2.
