= The Graham Norton Effect =

- Genre: Comedy
- Presented by: Graham Norton
- Country of origin: United States
- Original language: English
- No. of series: 1
- No. of episodes: 13

Production
- Running time: 60 minutes (inc. adverts)
- Production company: So Television

Original release
- Network: Comedy Central
- Release: June 24 – September 16, 2004

The Graham Norton Effect is a talk show hosted by the Irish comedian Graham Norton. The show aired on Comedy Central from June 24, 2004, to September 16, 2004.

The Graham Norton Effect can be considered a spin-off to two previous shows hosted by Norton, including So Graham Norton and V Graham Norton. During the last part of Graham's Channel 4 contract, Graham decided to film a new show, NY Graham Norton, in New York. The Graham Norton Effect was filmed for Comedy Central later in the year. Since this show was specifically taped for an American audience, some of the games played in the show were previously played on NY Graham Norton or V Graham Norton. (For example, a game about the world's worst bathing suits which was played in the Alan Cumming episode was originally played during a V episode with Bo Derek, tying into her movie 10.) Also, some of the guests, who were only on NY Graham Norton a couple of months previous, appear again on The Graham Norton Effect.

The show earned abysmal reception and was cancelled after one season. Reflecting on the show in 2012, Norton remarked: "It wasn't like we were a flop. ... We got our run, we did decent business for them [Comedy Central], we just weren't recommissioned. So it was kind of a non-story. But we certainly weren't the breakout hit they'd hoped we'd be."

== List of celebrity guests ==
| Date | Episode | Guests |
|---|---|---|
| June 24, 2004 | 1 | Sandra Bernhard and Marlon Wayans |
| July 1, 2004 | 2 | Jennifer Tilly and Julie Delpy |
| July 8, 2004 | 3 | Alan Cumming and Paul Rudd |
| July 15, 2004 | 4 | Macaulay Culkin and RuPaul |
| July 22, 2004 | 5 | Sharon Stone and Mena Suvari |
| July 29, 2004 | 6 | Shannen Doherty and Joan Rivers |
| August 5, 2004 | 7 | Seth Green and Matthew Lillard |
| August 12, 2004 | 8 | Anne Hathaway and John Waters |
| August 19, 2004 | 9 | Edie Falco and Carson Kressley |
| August 26, 2004 | 10 | Josh Hartnett, Katie Holmes, and Jon Voight |
| September 2, 2004 | 11 | Toni Collette and Jason Bateman |
| September 9, 2004 | 12 | Chris Rock and Marilyn Manson |
| September 16, 2004 | 13 | LL Cool J and Cyndi Lauper |

== List of games and events ==
The Graham Norton Effect, like all of Norton's shows, featured games and side attractions that often involved his guests. These side attractions usually relied on audience member participation. The guests would then take part in the event by guessing or choosing something based about the usually inane parameters Norton had defined about the game. For example, when playing "Guess the Partner", the guests would attempt to guess which two audience member participants were lovers based on physical features alone.

On occasion, Norton would even go so far as to secretly produce a pre-selected audience member's parents or lover to witness or take part in an embarrassing event without the audience member's knowledge.

- Episode 1: "Guess the Partner": Guests attempt to match lovers with their partners. "Barfly": Sandra Bernhard provides a remote voice for a life-size mannequin sitting at a neighborhood bar, to the confusion of other patrons.
- Episode 2: "Ass Makeover": Audience members make over their male partner's buttocks to resemble celebrities, such as Pamela Anderson, Michael Jackson and Bill Clinton.
- Episode 3: Audience members model regrettable swimwear.
- Episode 4: "Find The Lady": Guests attempt to identify which silhouette of four audience members is a woman from a group including three men in drag; the least feminine is sent to the streets to proposition men using pickup lines fed by RuPaul. "Date Jesus": Norton sets up an audience member on a date with a Jesus impersonator. "Lovers Line-up": Guests and audience members guess when participants last had sex by shouting “higher” or “lower”.
- Episode 5: Sharon Stone is sung to by a fan over the phone. Audience members are called on to tell suggestive pick-up lines to the episode's guests.
- Episode 6: Guests attempt to guess if a man is gay by the way he dances. "In the Dugout": Audience members and guests try to guess what base participants reached with other participants. "Candle-schticks": Audience members volunteer to make multi-colored candles molded from their male anatomy, which are placed on a cake and wheeled out by Joan Rivers. Graham interviews candle owners by name, asking "My god, what happened here?"
- Episode 7: Audience members attempt to guess which disguised participant is their lover by how they perform with a sex doll. Jade Esteban Estrada gets spanked by a dominatrix.
- Episode 8: A sexual euphemism contest takes place.
- Episode 9: Audience members reveal lies they have told to their parents. Carson Kressley talks about the man he'd most like to make over on Queer Eye for the Straight Guy.
- Episode 10: Graham holds a parody of the Summer Olympic Games in the streets. Graham gets an audience member to dress as an Adult Baby and puts his photo on the fetish site DailyDiapers.com.
- Episode 11: A George W. Bush impersonator is on the show. Audience members are asked to campaign for something close to them with mostly insipid results.
- Episode 12: Chris Rock gives Marilyn Manson marriage advice.
- Episode 13: Graham, perhaps in a mockery of Oprah Winfrey, makes audience members' dreams “come true” with less than perfect results.

== DVD releases ==
The Graham Norton Effect was released in its entirety (i.e. complete episodes, not a compilation) across two 2-disc DVD boxsets in Australia on 5 April 2005. The first set, titled 'Series 1/Part 1' contains the first seven episodes and the second, titled 'Series 1/Part 2' contains the final six. They were released on the Hopscotch Entertainment label.

Unlike the American Comedy Central broadcasts, the episodes on the DVDs are more or less uncensored, apart for things on Graham's computer monitor that were pre-censored during taping. Language that was bleeped by Comedy Central is presented un-bleeped and the nudity is presented un-obscured. On the DVDs, however, none of the episodes contain their ending credit rolls. They simply end with the SO Television endboard after Graham signs off.

== International broadcasting ==
- UK: BBC Three
- Australia: The Comedy Channel
- New Zealand: TV ONE
- Canada: OutTV
- Germany: TIMM
