= Nortonland =

Nortonland is a British television clip show that aired on digital channel Challenge, and was based on games played on Graham Norton's Channel 4 show V Graham Norton. It began airing on 6 August 2007 and aired at 11pm on Monday to Thursday.

The show is set around a fictional animated theme park called "Nortonland" in which a tour guide takes the viewer around the theme park to show a selection of games. About three games are played in one half-hour episode. Whilst Norton owns half of the company that produces the show, SO Television, he is not seen to be at all affiliated with the show, except for starring in the clips.

One such episode was accidentally broadcast in a 16:9 widescreen format, giving Challenge viewers a very rare chance to view a widescreen programme that is not cropped into a 14:9 picture. Challenge now broadcasts full-time in widescreen. The final few episodes broadcast were actually repeats of episodes broadcast earlier in the series.

== See also ==
- V Graham Norton
- SO Television
