= Just Ignore Him =

2020 memoir by Alan Davies

- Front cover
- Author: Alan Davies
- Language: English
- Genre: Memoir
- Publisher: Little, Brown and Company
- Publication date: 1 September 2020
- Publication place: United Kingdom
- Media type: Print
- Pages: 288
- ISBN: 9781408713297

Just Ignore Him is a 2020 memoir by the British comedian Alan Davies, detailing his early childhood.

== Background ==
Alan Davies is a British comedian, known for his acting in Jonathan Creek and permanent role on the panel show QI. Just Ignore Him was his second book, following My Favourite People And Me, 1978–88 (2009), which was republished as Teenage Revolution. Davies later said of his first book that "all the things that mattered were missing". Davies worked on Just Ignore Him while pursuing a part-time MA in creative writing at Goldsmiths, University of London. He began the MA course in 2016, initially writing short stories about his life in the third person. At the end of his first year, he submitted for assessment a passage of writing which later became the chapter "Hands", with few changes needed. Davies expressed an interest in writing a stand-up show about the material covered in the book.

Davies consulted with friends about his plan for the book, some of whom asked if he was sure that he wanted the personal information within it to be public. He viewed the story as his and his mother's and wished for it to be told. In an interview with The Observer, Davies said that: "I also wanted to tell people they could talk about their own stories, even if they had never talked about them before". Davies aimed for the book to be "a record to last a long time" and wanted his children to read it when they were older. Davies found it "very, very difficult" and not cathartic to write it.

The book was announced in November 2019 and published in the United Kingdom by Little, Brown and Company on 1 September 2020. Autumn is the most frequent book release period in the UK and the day and week in which Just Ignore Him was published were particularly busy due to delays caused by the COVID-19 pandemic.

According to the Sydney Morning Herald, Davies was reluctant to engage in press work for the book, wishing his audience to discover the nature of its subject matter through reading it. He wanted the mention of abuse to be omitted from publications prior to the book's release. His publishers did not communicate this to newspapers, at least in the case of his interview with the Sydney Morning Herald, which chose to publish details about the book's subject matter along with extracts from the interview where Davies explains why he did not want the details to be published.

== Synopsis ==
The book is about Davies' early childhood, including the death of his mother and sexual abuse by his father. It covers how these events affected him throughout his life.

== Reception ==
Fiona Sturges of The Observer praised the book as "fiercely honest". Sturges described the book as mostly serious, though containing bleak humour, and found it "sometimes upsetting" and "more sad than angry". Sturges later chose it as one of the best five celebrity memoirs of 2020, calling it "intimate" and "open-hearted". The Sunday Times chose it as the best film and theatre book of 2020, in their list of "The 37 best books of 2020". In his review for the publication, Jonathan Dean called it "Surely the bravest memoir of the year".
