= Alan Davies Après-Ski =

British television series

- Genre: Comedy
- Presented by: Alan Davies
- Country of origin: United Kingdom
- Original language: English
- No. of series: 1
- No. of episodes: 3 (list of episodes)

Production
- Executive producers: Graham Stuart; Alan Tyler
- Producer: Mark Barrett
- Running time: 30 minutes
- Production company: So Television

Original release
- Network: BBC Two; BBC Two HD
- Release: 7 February – 21 February 2014

Alan Davies Après-Ski is a British comedy television series broadcast on BBC Two between 7 and 21 February 2014 to coincide with the beginning, middle and end of the 2014 Winter Olympics. Presented by Alan Davies, the three-part series was produced by So Television.

== Production ==
Alan Davies Après-Ski was commissioned by Janice Hadlow and Mark Linsey for the BBC. The producer was Mark Barrett and executive producers were Graham Stuart for So Television and Alan Tyler for the BBC. Each episode was recorded in front of a studio audience on the day of the broadcast.

== Episode list ==
No.	Guests	Original release date
1	Konrad Bartelski; Sofie Hagen; Andrew Maxwell; Sally-Anne Stapleford; Amy Williams; Steven Bradbury	7 February 2014
2	Bill Bailey; Katherine Ryan; Else Kåss Furuseth; Aimee Fuller; Franz Klammer	14 February 2014
3	Chemmy Alcott; Steve Cram; Sara Pascoe; Eva Samková; Mark Watson; Winston Watts	21 February 2014
