= Roman Road (film) =

Roman Road was a one-off TV Drama that aired on ITV on 31 December 2004.

== Plot summary ==
Vince is a writer who suddenly decides to visit his old college friend Matt (who knows more than a bit about map-reading) to join him on an expedition. They both set off to walk the Roman road from Chichester to London, but it doesn't take long for it to become apparent that they're being chased by a mystery man in a fast car. It seems Vince has something in his backpack that someone wants very badly indeed.

== Cast ==
Role	Actor
Vince	Alan Davies
Matt Bancroft	John Gordon Sinclair
Paul	James Larkin
Maddy Bancroft	Anna Chancellor
Ella	Holly McDermott
Ella	Rosey McDermott
Ella	Daisy McDermott
