= Alan Davies =

English entertainer (born 1966)

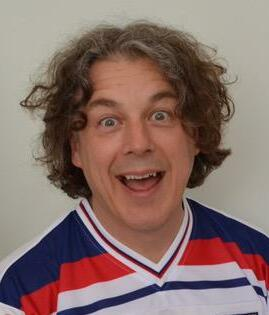
- Davies in 2014
- Born: Alan Roger Davies; 6 March 1966 (age 60); Loughton, Essex, England
- Education: Loughton College of Further Education; University of Kent (BA); Goldsmiths, University of London (MA)
- Notable work: Jonathan Creek; QI; Bob & Rose; Alan Davies: As Yet Untitled
- Spouse: Katie Maskell (m. 2007)
- Children: 3

Comedy career
- Years active: 1988–present
- Medium: Stand-up; television; film; podcast
- Genres: Observational comedy; clean comedy; surreal humour

Alan Roger Davies (/ˈdeɪvɪs/ DAY-vis; born 6 March 1966) is an English actor, presenter, stand-up comedian, and writer. He is known for his portrayal of the title role in the BBC mystery drama series Jonathan Creek (1997–2016) and as the only permanent panellist on the BBC panel show QI since its premiere in 2003, outlasting its original host Stephen Fry.

He began his career as a stand-up comic, and has undertaken several tours performing on stage, most recently in 2025. He has also written three memoirs.

== Early life and education ==
Alan Roger Davies was born on 6 March 1966 in Loughton, Essex, and spent his childhood years in Chingford. He has an older brother and a younger sister. When Davies was six, his mother died from leukaemia and he was raised by his father, who was a Scout leader, with his paternal grandparents relocating from Blackpool, to which they had recently moved, to help out. He was sexually abused by his father from age 8 to 13, as described in his book Just Ignore Him. Davies also wrote that his brother and sister were turned against him, which began his strong desire to please others. This led him to shoplift for schoolmates and play the joker at home. He no longer speaks to his brother. His father remarried, to Joan, in 1982, when Davies was 16.

Davies attended Staples Road School in Loughton and was privately educated at Bancroft's School in Woodford Green, where he gained eight O-Levels. He then moved on to Loughton College of Further Education where he gained four more O-Levels and two A-Levels (Communications and Theatre Studies). He graduated in Drama and Theatre Studies from the University of Kent at Canterbury in 1988.

In 2016, he pursued a Master of Arts degree in Creative Writing at Goldsmiths, University of London, which he completed in September 2018.

== Career ==
=== Stand-up ===
Davies began performing comedy in 1988 at the Whitstable Labour Club. He continued touring and performing in the UK and Australia, winning the Edinburgh Festival Critics Award for Comedy in 1994. That show was released on video and audio cassette in 1995 as Alan Davies Live at the Lyric recorded at the Lyric Theatre as part of the Perrier Pick of the Fringe season in October 1994.

A version of his show Urban Trauma, which ran in the West End at the Duchess Theatre and toured the UK and Australia, was shown on BBC One in 1998.

In 2012, Davies planned a new tour called Life is Pain. The title for this show came from a story he heard about a six-year-old girl being told off by her mother and responding "Life is pain". The tour was broadcast on Dave.

In 2025 Davies took a new stand-up show, called Think Ahead, on his first tour in ten years. Performing first in venues across England and Wales from September until November, he then toured to Australia, from November and December 2025.

=== Radio and television ===
In 1994 and 1995, Davies hosted Alan's Big One for three series on Radio 1 before appearing in Channel 4's spoof travel show One for the Road (made by Channel X in 1994/5).

From 1997 to 2016, he played the title role in Jonathan Creek, as a trick-deviser for a stage magician, with a side interest in solving crimes. Jonathan Creek won a BAFTA for Best Drama and brought Davies to mainstream attention. The series ran semi-regularly between 1997 and 2004. On New Year's Day 2009 a special episode titled "The Grinning Man" was broadcast on the BBC. Further specials were aired in 2010 ("The Judas Tree") and 2013 ("The Clue of the Savant's Thumb").

Davies co-wrote and starred in his own radio sitcom, The Alan Davies Show, in 1998. Cassettes of the show were produced and released by the BBC, with episodes broadcast on the digital radio station BBC7. He played Russell Boyd in the BBC comedy A Many Splintered Thing, also in 1998 and 2000.

In 2001, Davies played Robert Gossage in Bob and Rose, a comedy drama about a gay man falling for a woman. He also played Jack the dog in the radio sitcom About a Dog. In 2003, Davies appeared as a Star in a Reasonably-Priced Car on Top Gear, with a time of 1:54 in wet conditions. He returned in Series 8 with 1:50.3 in dry conditions. During a period from the mid-1990s to 2002, Davies advertised for Abbey National.

Davies took on a less comedic role in 2004, starring as Henry Farmer, a maverick barrister, in ITV Sunday night drama The Brief, for two series. Subsequent drama roles include Superintendent Mallard in Agatha Christie's Marple (ITV, 2008), as well as appearances in The Good Housekeeping Guide (BBC One, 2006), Roman Road (ITV 2004), and Hotel Babylon (BBC One, 2008).

He argued the case for John Lennon as the greatest Briton of all time on the BBC's Great Britons series in 2002. In 2007, Davies starred in the second episode of ITV's You Don't Know You're Born and on The Unbelievable Truth.

He appeared in an episode of the BBC science programme Horizon in which Professor Marcus du Sautoy attempted to introduce him to elements of mathematical thought, which was broadcast on BBC Two on 31 March 2009. He went on to appear in Horizon for a second time in November 2009, this time leading the episode — du Sautoy also returned as a guest speaker.

On 16 May 2010, Davies appeared in "Your Sudden Death Question", an episode of the ITV detective series Lewis, as Marcus Richard, a scamming quizmaster at a competition held in an Oxford college, at which some of the contestants are murdered. In September 2010, he began a three-part documentary series Alan Davies' Teenage Revolution (Channel 4), partly based on his autobiographical book My Favourite People and Me, 1978–88.

In September 2010, a BBC comedy series entitled Whites starring Davies as a chef premiered. It was cancelled after the first series. It is believed to have been a victim of the cuts at the BBC subsequent to the reduced licence fee settlement.

In April 2011, Davies appeared as the guest on the return of the ABC TV conversation program A Quiet Word With .... In 2011, Davies was also one of the judges on the ITV programme Show Me The Funny, a talent contest for new and aspiring stand-up comedy performers.

In September 2012, Davies made his first appearance on Channel 4's Big Fat Quiz series, winning The Big Fat Quiz of the '90s alongside Phill Jupitus.

In February 2014, Davies presented a chat show Alan Davies Après-Ski on BBC Two, which looked at some of the highlights of the 2014 Winter Olympic Games. He also co-hosted the Brazilian Banter podcast for ITV with Tom & Dom from Bantams Banter. The show was a satirical look at the 2014 FIFA World Cup hosted by Brazil.

From 2014, he hosted The Dog Rescuers for Channel 5 and the chat show Alan Davies: As Yet Untitled for Dave.

In 2021, Davis took part in the twelfth series of Taskmaster, finishing in joint third with Desiree Burch. He was a studio fill-in for Jonnie Peacock for the "New Year's Treat" special in 2022, due to Peacock being unwell.

==== QI ====
Davies appears as the only permanent panellist on the BBC Two comedy quiz game QI; the programme was hosted by Stephen Fry from 2003 to 2016, and has been hosted by Sandi Toksvig after Fry's departure. He also contributed "four words" to the QI book The Book of General Ignorance (which appear after Stephen Fry's foreword), "Will this do, Stephen?". Davies has appeared in almost every regular episode of the show, though in one episode (Episode 10 of Series D, "Divination") he appeared, pre-recorded, in only the first few minutes, as he was in Paris attending the UEFA Champions League Final between Barcelona and his beloved Arsenal during the recording. His chair was empty for the rest of the episode, although his voice was heard during "General Ignorance". He also did not appear in the 2011 Comic Relief episode, when his seat was taken by David Walliams. During the filming of the QI Christmas episode 2020, Davies set the new Guinness World Record for the most Christmas crackers pulled by an individual in 30 seconds, achieving 35 successful cracks. His record stood until Joel Corry achieved 41 successful cracks at Capital's Jingle Bell Ball on 12 December 2021.

== Books ==
Davies's first book, the autobiographical My Favourite People and Me, 1978–88 was published by Michael Joseph (Penguin Books) in September 2009. Of the memoir, Davies said he wished to "attempt to remember what I liked as a boy/youth/idiot and to work out why". The favourite people referred to in the title include Anton Chekhov, John Belushi, Barry Sheene, Margaret Thatcher ("only for a few days" the author allows), John McEnroe and Starsky and Hutch. The book also mentions Arsenal F.C., the football team supported by Davies; he recalls as a child his mother sewing their club badge and captain's number onto his shirt, done only a year or so before she died. The paperback was published under the title Rebel Without A Clue: How the 80s Made Me.

His second memoir and autobiography, Just Ignore Him, was published in September 2020. The book details the sexual abuse that he suffered as a boy from his father between the ages of 8 and 13. In adulthood both the police and the CPS accepted Davies' abuse accusations but declined to prosecute his father Roy Davies, due to his Alzheimer's disease and his by then advancing years. Davies promoted the book during a BBC Radio 5 Live interview, first broadcast on 9 December 2020.

Davies's third book, White Male Stand-Up, was published in September 2025, and details the early years of his career, and how he was affected during them by the events of his childhood. Davies described it as a "[reappraisal of] my stand-up comedy career, and my career in acting [...] knowing the hidden burden I was carrying".

== Recognition and honours ==
In 1991, Davies was named Time Out's Best Young Comic.

In 2001, he won the Best Actor award at the Monte Carlo TV Festival for his performance as Robert Gossage in Bob and Rose.

He was awarded an honorary doctorate by University of Kent at Canterbury in 2003.

== Personal life ==
Davies married Katie Maskell, a writer, on 13 January 2007 after a six-month engagement. The couple first met backstage at QI in 2005. Friend and comedy partner Bill Bailey was Davies' best man. The couple have three children: a daughter and two sons. Before meeting Maskell, Davies had been in relationships with Catherine Porter and Julia Sawalha.

Davies is a pescetarian. He narrated an anti-vivisection video for Animal Aid called Wasted Lives in 2006.

In late 2007, The Times and The Daily Telegraph both reported that Davies bit the ear of a homeless man. Davies had just left a wake at the nearby Groucho Club. He told The Times in 2009, "He wasn't a tramp. He was a raging, horrendous arsehole. He called me a cunt several times. Or if it wasn't him, it was his mate. And, yes, I went for him and, yes, I did it in what turned out to be an amusing way." Following the incident, Davies was banned from the Groucho Club.

Davies is a lifelong fan and season ticket holder of Arsenal F.C. Davies also hosts an Arsenal podcast, now known as "The Tuesday Club" (formerly "It's Up for Grabs Now").

Davies is a supporter of the Labour Party. In 2013, he told Saga magazine: "Social injustice is important to me. Life isn't about every man for himself. Life should be about co-operation and collaboration." Despite initially voting for Jeremy Corbyn to be party leader, at the time of the 2016 Labour leadership election, Davies said in an interview that he supported Owen Smith's leadership bid, saying Corbyn was an ineffective Leader of the Opposition.

== Filmography ==
=== Television ===
Year	Title	Role	Channel	Notes
1995	One for the Road	Simon Treat	Channel 4	1 series
1997–2016	Jonathan Creek	Jonathan Creek	BBC One	5 series
1998–2000	A Many Splintered Thing	Russel Boyd	BBC One	1 series
2001	Bob & Rose	Robert Gossage	ITV	1 series
2003–	QI	Permanent panellist	BBC Two	20 series
2004–2005	The Brief	Henry Farmer	ITV	2 series
2006	The Good Housekeeping Guide	Raymond Fox	BBC One	TV film
2007	Agatha Christie's Marple	Mallard	ITV	Episode: "Towards Zero"
2008	Hotel Babylon	Otto Clark	BBC One	2 episodes
2009	Horizon	Host	BBC Two	TV short
2010	Whites	Roland White	BBC Two	1 series
2010	Lewis	Marcus Richards	ITV	Episode: "Your Sudden Death Questioned"
2011	Little Crackers	Comedian / Alan	Sky1	2 episodes
2011	Show Me the Funny	Himself, Judge	ITV	1 series
2014	Alan Davies Après-Ski	Presenter	BBC Two	1 series
2014	Playhouse Presents	Al	Sky Arts 1	Episode: Damned
2014–	Alan Davies: As Yet Untitled	Presenter	Dave	7 series
2014–	The Dog Rescuers	Presenter	Channel 5	6 series
2015	Would I Lie To You?	Himself, Panelist	BBC One	Series 9, Episode 4
2016	All Over the Workplace	Himself	CBBC	1 episode
2016–2018	Damned	Al	Channel 4	2 series
2018	Frankie Drake Mysteries	Jonny Cork	CBC Television	1 episode
2019	Flack	Dan Proctor	W	1 episode
2021	Taskmaster	Himself	Channel 4	Series 12; New Year Treat II
2022	McDonald & Dodds	George Gillian	ITV	Episode: "Belvedere"
2023	Have You Been Paying Attention?	Himself	Network 10	2 episodes
2024	Perfect Pub Walks with Bill Bailey	Himself	More4	Episode: "Highs & Lows"
2024	Travel Man	Himself	Channel 4	Episode: "Trieste"

=== Film ===
Year	Title	Role	Note(s)
1999	The Comedy Trail: A Shaggy Dog Story	Himself	TV special
2001	Dog Eat Dog	Phil	
2004	Roman Road	Vince	Television film
2008	Angus, Thongs and Perfect Snogging	Bob Nicolson	Georgia's dad
2018	The Bromley Boys	Donald Roberts	

== Stand-up VHS and DVDs ==
- Live at the Lyric (1994)
- Urban Trauma (1998)
- Life is Pain: Live in London (18 November 2013)
- Little Victories (28 November 2016)
