= Graham Norton's Bigger Picture =

- Genre: Comedy
- Presented by: Graham Norton
- Country of origin: United Kingdom
- Original language: English
- No. of series: 3
- No. of episodes: 24

Production
- Running time: 45 minutes
- Production company: So Television

Original release
- Network: BBC One
- Release: 1 August 2005 – 20 November 2006

Graham Norton's Bigger Picture (previously named The Bigger Picture with Graham Norton) is a British comedy panel chat show broadcast on BBC One from 1 August 2005 until 20 November 2006, in which presenter Graham Norton informally and satirically discusses the week's news with a panel of invited celebrity guests. The show begins with the celebrities being shown in mocked-up photographs of themselves in scenes involving other celebrities, and ends with the guests introducing other mocked up photographs that humorously explain the recent behaviour of other celebrities.

== Episodes ==
=== Series 1 ===
The guests for the series were:

Episode	Guests
Pilot	Jenny Eclair, Janet Street-Porter, and Mackenzie Crook
1	Jane Moore, Jo Brand and Richard Wilson
2	Angela Griffin, Val Kilmer, Sandi Toksvig, and Toby Young
3	Griff Rhys Jones, Gina Yashere, Rob Lowe, and Derek Laud
4	Natalie Cassidy, Germaine Greer, Elijah Wood, and Steve Carell
5	Greg Proops, Cate Blanchett, and Davina McCall
6	Jerry Hall, Ruby Wax, and Shane Warne

=== Series 2 ===
The guests for the series were:

Episode	Guests
1	Rupert Everett, John Simpson, and Jo Brand
2	Ian McKellen, Alan Cumming, Sandi Toksvig, and Neve Campbell
3	Lorraine Kelly, Joan Collins, and Mark Steel
4	Carol Thatcher, Ruby Wax, Chantelle Houghton, and Ben Fogle
5	Kacey Ainsworth, Sue Perkins, Louis Walsh, and Rachel Hunter
6	Roseanne Barr, Maureen Lipman, and Woody Harrelson
7	Mischa Barton, Alice Cooper, John Waters, and Jenny Eclair
8	Christina Ricci, Hugh Dennis, Lulu, and Anthony Head

=== Series 3 ===
The guests for the series were:

Episode	Guests
1	Minnie Driver, Patrick Swayze, Sandi Toksvig, and Phil Nichol
2	Jackie Collins, Shane Warne, Marcus Brigstocke, and Juliette Lewis
3	Michael Barrymore, Danny Wallace, and Lorraine Kelly
4	Dustin Hoffman, Andrew Lloyd Webber, and Joanna Lumley
5	Jo Brand, Clive James, Rupert Everett, and Jane Horrocks
6	Griff Rhys Jones, Elaine Paige, Ed Byrne, and George Foreman
7	Harry Shearer, Cilla Black, Janet Street-Porter, and Christian Slater
8	Emma Bunton, Jason Isaacs, Fred MacAulay and Alan Cumming
9	Louis Walsh, Jo Caulfield, and Richard Madeley
10	Mackenzie Crook, Clive Anderson, and Susan Sarandon
