= So Television =

British TV production company

So Television & So Radio Limited
- Type: Subsidiary
- Industry: Media
- Founded: 1998; 28 years ago
- Founder: Graham Norton; Graham Stuart
- Headquarters: London, United Kingdom
- Products: Television; Radio
- Parent: ITV Studios (2012–present)
- Website: sotelevision.co.uk

So Television & So Radio Limited is a production company established in 1998, founded by Irish comedian Graham Norton and Graham Stuart to make television shows. The company is well known for producing Norton's chat shows, including So Graham Norton and V Graham Norton for Channel 4 and The Graham Norton Show for BBC One and BBC Two. The company also produces various shows for BBC Radio 4 under the name of So Radio. So Television and So Radio are based in London, England. On 30 August 2012, ITV Studios acquired So Television for an estimated £17 million.

== Selected shows ==
Show	Production Years	Broadcaster
So Graham Norton	1998–2002	Channel 4
Paul Daniels in a Black Hole	2001	BBC
V Graham Norton	2002–2003	Channel 4
The Russell Brand Show	2004	Channel 4
NY Graham Norton	2004	Comedy Central
The Graham Norton Effect	2004	Comedy Central
The Bigger Picture with Graham Norton	2005–2006	BBC One
Bring Back...	2005–2009	Channel 4
Richard Hammond's 5 O'Clock Show	2006	ITV
School's Out	2006–2007	BBC One
Nortonland	2007	Challenge
The Graham Norton Show	2007–present	BBC Two (2007–2009); BBC One (2009–present)
Sorry, I've Got No Head	2008–2011	BBC One; CBBC
Pixelface	2011–2012	BBC One; CBBC
The Sarah Millican Television Programme	2012–2013	BBC Two
Alan Davies Après-Ski	2014	BBC Two
Blind Date	2017–2019	Channel 5
Chuckle Time	2018	Channel 5
The John Bishop Show	2022–2023	ITV
The Claudia Winkleman Show	2026	BBC One

== Awards ==
2002

- Broadcast Awards – Best Entertainment Programme
- BAFTA – Best Entertainment Performance
- Rose D'Or Montreux – Bronze Rose Variety Programmes
- TV Quick – Best Entertainment Programme
- National TV Awards – Best Talk Show
- British Comedy Awards – Best Entertainment Performance
- British Comedy Awards – Best Entertainment Show

2001

- International Emmy – Best Popular Arts
- BAFTA – Best Entertainment Programme
- BAFTA – Best Entertainment Performance
- Royal Television Society Awards – Best Presenter
- British Comedy Awards – Best Entertainment Series
- TV Quick Awards – Best Entertainment Programme

2000

- BAFTA – Best Entertainment Performer
- British Comedy Awards – Best Entertainment Performance
- Broadcasting Press Guild Awards – Best TV Performer
- Television and Radio Industry Awards – Best TV Presenter
- Variety Club Television – Personality of the Year

1999

- British Comedy Awards – Best Talk Show

1998

- British Comedy Awards – Best Newcomer
- Perrier Comedy Awards – Nomination
