= V Graham Norton =

- Genre: Comedy
- Presented by: Graham Norton
- Country of origin: United Kingdom
- Original language: English
- No. of series: 5
- No. of episodes: 264

Production
- Running time: 30 minutes (inc. adverts)
- Production company: So Television

Original release
- Network: Channel 4
- Release: 6 May 2002 – 28 December 2003

Related
- So Graham Norton (1998–2002); The Graham Norton Show (2007–present)

V Graham Norton is a British chat show broadcast on Channel 4 in the United Kingdom starring Graham Norton, broadcast every weeknight as a successor to the weekly So Graham Norton. It aired from 6 May 2002 to 28 December 2003. It featured celebrities who chatted with Graham and became involved in studio games which were usually laden with sexual innuendo. The studio games were later featured on the clip show Nortonland in 2007 on digital channel Challenge.

The show features a 'webcam', a roving television camera which was randomly situated in a different place in the UK each week (though often in Covent Garden) and which followed Graham's instructions and allowed him to interact live with the public. The feature was made technically possible using digital microwave link technology provided by Rear Window Television with the 'spontaneous' webcam feature always produced as a full quality outside broadcast, before being made to look like a traditional webcam at the studio.

The most often repeated (and voted as the show's funniest) moment involved Graham and Dustin Hoffman interacting live with a passenger (and later, the driver) of a London taxi cab driving through the city. Another notable episode was with Harvey Keitel who was upset by Graham having an action figure with a gun based on his character in Reservoir Dogs.

== Episode guide ==
| Date | Episode Number | Guests |
Series 1
| 6 May 2002 | 1 | Grace Jones and Ronan Keating |
| 7 May 2002 | 2 | Petula Clark |
| 8 May 2002 | 3 | Jilly Cooper |
| 9 May 2002 | 4 | Sophia Loren |
| 10 May 2002 | 5 | Josh Hartnett |
| 13 May 2002 | 6 | Gary Numan and Terry Venables |
| 14 May 2002 | 7 | Gillian Anderson |
| 15 May 2002 | 8 | Kacey Ainsworth |
| 16 May 2002 | 9 | Lulu and A1 |
| 17 May 2002 | 10 | Deborah Harry |
| 20 May 2002 | 11 | Martha Reeves and Marc Salem |
| 21 May 2002 | 12 | Lucy Speed and The Proclaimers |
| 22 May 2002 | 13 | Joan Collins and Mark O'Shea |
| 23 May 2002 | 14 | Joely Fisher and James Herbert |
| 24 May 2002 | 15 | Will Young |
| 27 May 2002 | 16 | Jerry Hall |
| 28 May 2002 | 17 | Samantha Mumba |
| 29 May 2002 | 18 | Andie MacDowell |
| 30 May 2002 | 19 | Sophie Ellis-Bextor and Ruby Wax |
| 31 May 2002 | 20 | Naomi Campbell |
| 3 Jun 2002 | 21 | Liz Smith and Alex Ferns |
| 4 Jun 2002 | 22 | Ozzy and Sharon Osbourne |
| 5 Jun 2002 | 23 | Kevin Kennedy and Liza Tarbuck |
| 6 Jun 2002 | 24 | Ben Elton |
| 7 Jun 2002 | 25 | Alan Cumming |
| 10 Jun 2002 | 26 | Emma Chambers and Huey Morgan |
| 11 Jun 2002 | 27 | Sheryl Crow |
| 12 Jun 2002 | 28 | Alex Kingston |
| 13 Jun 2002 | 29 | Toyah Willcox and Joachim Cortes |
| 14 Jun 2002 | 30 | Jennifer Tilly |
| 17 Jun 2002 | 31 | Daryl Hannah |
| 18 Jun 2002 | 32 | Joan Rivers and Mis-Teeq |
| 19 Jun 2002 | 33 | Ben Chaplin |
| 20 Jun 2002 | 34 | Gillian Taylforth |
| 21 Jun 2002 | 35 | Ivana Trump and Sonya Fitzpatrick |
| 24 Jun 2002 | 36 | Natalie Imbruglia and Mo Mowlam |
| 25 Jun 2002 | 37 | Kathy Burke |
| 26 Jun 2002 | 38 | Dennis Hopper |
| 27 Jun 2002 | 39 | Neil Diamond |
| 28 Jun 2002 | 40 | Siouxsie Sioux |
| 1 Jul 2002 | 41 | Morten Harket and Jackie Collins |
| 2 Jul 2002 | 42 | Isaac Hayes |
| 3 Jul 2002 | 43 | Anthony Head |
| 4 Jul 2002 | 44 | Harvey Keitel |
| 5 Jul 2002 | 45 | Bryan Adams |
| 8 Jul 2002 | 46 | Mike Myers and Robert Wagner |
| 9 Jul 2002 | 47 | Milla Jovovich |
| 10 Jul 2002 | 48 | Rachel Griffiths |
| 10 Jul 2002 | 49 | Barbara Hershey |
| 12 Jul 2002 | 50 | Sandra Bernhard |
| 15 Jul 2002 | 51 | Steve Irwin |
| 16 Jul 2002 | 52 | Jimi Mistry |
| 17 Jul 2002 | 53 | Paul Nicholls and the Pet Shop Boys |
| 18 Jul 2002 | 54 | Margarita Pracatan |
| 19 Jul 2002 | 55 | Bo Derek |
| 22 Jul 2002 | 56 | Kyle MacLachlan |
| 23 Jul 2002 | 57 | Gordon Ramsay |
| 24 Jul 2002 | 58 | Russell Watson |
| 25 Jul 2002 | 59 | Dustin Hoffman |
| 26 Jul 2002 | 60 | Rupert Everett and the Sugababes |
| 29 Jul 2002 | 61 | Liza Minnelli |
| 30 Jul 2002 | 62 | Brenda Blethyn and Jade Goody |
| 31 Jul 2002 | 63 | Alison Moyet and Jade Goody |
| 1 Aug 2002 | 64 | Ursula Andress and Jade Goody |
| 2 Aug 2002 | 65 | Alanis Morissette |
