= So Graham Norton =

British television chat show

- Genre: Comedy
- Presented by: Graham Norton
- Country of origin: United Kingdom
- Original language: English
- No. of series: 5
- No. of episodes: 76

Production
- Running time: 60 minutes (inc. adverts)
- Production company: So Television

Original release
- Network: Channel 4
- Release: 3 July 1998 – 1 March 2002

Related
- V Graham Norton (2002–2003); The Graham Norton Show (2007–present)

So Graham Norton is a British television chat show hosted by Irish personality Graham Norton. It aired on Channel 4 from 3 July 1998 to 1 March 2002.

== Theme ==
The show was primarily adult-orientated, with host Norton dishing out many sexual innuendos and stories. A staple of the show is the beginning of the programme, which involved large amounts of audience participation (named "So . . .", with the blank filled with a different adjective every show). Audience members would usually share embarrassing stories (nearly always of a sexual nature), and Norton would then sometimes use the same audience members for later games, with real prizes. Also, a recurring lightweight segment included Norton looking for people on the Internet with different fetishes, including balloons, gloves.

== Format (timeframe) ==
The entire series consisted of 5 series. In the later series, the run started around October and ran all the way to February or March. There were shows broadcast during Christmas and New Year's weeks and there was also a millennium special.

== Guests ==
The guests were not typical talk show guests. Most of them were not there to promote their latest project, but were there at Norton's behest. For example, John Waters only flew to England because he had been invited to appear on the show by Norton, since Norton chose the guests himself. Generally, these were the people that Norton grew up with. There were reality show stars, gay icons, old American television stars and soap stars. There were not many musicians, and those who did make an appearance, with exception of S Club 7, were not there to sing.

== Recurring themes ==
A running gag on the programme is Norton's obsession with Tarzan, the Ape Man star Miles O'Keeffe. Norton has a framed photo of O'Keeffe as Tarzan and O'Keeffe would often be phoned by Norton.

Betty Hoskins (2 August 1922 – December 2019) was an elderly woman who first appeared on the show as a contestant in one of the mini-games. She was a dinner lady at the drama school that Norton attended. Hoskins featured in many episodes of the show as well as on Norton's subsequent programmes.

== Future ==
The show was a success and was ultimately extended to five nights a week under a new name V Graham Norton.

== Episode guide ==
=== Series 1 ===
Date	Episode Number	Guests
3 July 1998	1	Ivana Trump, Kathy Burke, and Sooty
10 July 1998	2	George Melly and Ulrika Jonsson
17 July 1998	3	Honor Blackman and David Blaine
24 July 1998	4	Linford Christie and Nanette Newman
31 July 1998	5	Grace Jones and Judith Chalmers
7 August 1998	6	Stephen Fry and Lorraine Kelly
14 August 1998	7	Kylie Minogue and Ian McCaskill
24 December 1998; Christmas special	8	Pam St Clement and La Toya Jackson

=== Series 2 ===
Date	Episode Number	Guests
5 February 1999	1	Sophie Dahl and Bo Derek
12 February 1999	2	Sandie Shaw and Alexis Arquette
19 February 1999	3	Brenda Blethyn and Gloria Hunniford
26 February 1999	4	Ursula Andress and Julie Hesmondhalgh
5 March 1999	5	Jan Leeming and Jason Orange
12 March 1999	6	Kate O'Mara and Roy Scheider
19 March 1999	7	Anne Robinson and Miles O'Keeffe
26 March 1999	8	Joan Collins and Marc Almond
2 April 1999	9	Katie Price and Billy Zane
9 April 1999	10	Roger Moore and Philippa Forrester
16 April 1999	11	Fern Britton and Stephanie Beacham

=== Series 3 ===
Date	Episode Number	Guests
19 November 1999	1	Lee Majors and Liz Smith
26 November 1999	2	Twiggy and Huey Morgan
3 December 1999	3	Jackie Stallone and Glenda Jackson
10 December 1999	4	Terry Wogan and Carrie Fisher
17 December 1999	5	Gilbert and George and Adam Rickitt
24 December 1999; Christmas special	6	Valerie Singleton, Goldie, and The She Boom Drummers
31 December 1999; Millennium special	7	Ivana Trump, Sandra Bernhard, and Raquel Welch
21 January 2000	8	Georgia Taylor, Martin Hancock, Sharon Gless and Tyne Daly
28 January 2000	9	Michael Learned and Trude Mostue
4 February 2000	10	Joan Rivers and Boy George
11 February 2000	11	Jason Priestley and Mo Mowlam
18 February 2000	12	Catherine Deneuve and Zandra Rhodes
25 February 2000	13	Bea Arthur and Stefanie Powers
3 March 2000	14	Julie Goodyear and Patsy Palmer
10 March 2000	15	Lynda Carter and Leslie Nielsen
17 March 2000	16	Naomi Campbell and Jilly Goolden
24 March 2000	17	Richard Wilson and Joan Collins

=== Series 4 ===
Date	Episode Number	Guests
3 November 2000	1	Molly Ringwald and Davina McCall
10 November 2000	2	Lauren Bacall, Natalie Cassidy and Jack Ryder
17 November 2000	3	Patrick Duffy and Sheena Easton
24 November 2000	4	Jane Horrocks and Richard Chamberlain
1 December 2000	5	Macaulay Culkin and Kyle MacLachlan
8 December 2000	6	Hannah Gordon and Barbara Windsor
15 December 2000	7	Marianne Faithfull and Laurence Llewellyn-Bowen
22 December 2000; Christmas special	8	Carrie Fisher, Roger Moore, and Nigella Lawson
29 December 2000	9	Jane Seymour and Carol Smillie
12 January 2001	10	Richard Madeley, Judy Finnigan and Sinéad O'Connor
19 January 2001	11	Sarah Brightman and Amanda Donohoe
26 January 2001	12	Martin Kemp and Jane Birkin
2 February 2001	13	Lindsay Wagner and Charlie Dimmock
9 February 2001	14	Melanie Brown and Anneka Rice
16 February 2001	15	Sophia Loren and Ben Fogle
23 February 2001	16	Dolly Parton and Alan Halsall
2 March 2001	17	Richard E. Grant and David Ginola
9 March 2001	18	Elton John and Kim Wilde
16 March 2001	19	William Shatner and Craig Doyle
23 March 2001	20	Lulu and Lynda Bellingham
30 March 2001	21	Ricki Lake and Stephen Gately
6 April 2001	22	Christopher Lambert and Jane McDonald
13 April 2001	23	Donny Osmond and Jacqueline Bisset
20 April 2001	24	Geri Halliwell and Lynn Redgrave
27 April 2001	25	Shannen Doherty and Vicky Entwistle

=== Series 5 ===
Date	Episode Number	Guests
2 November 2001	1	Cher, Jessie Wallace, and Andrea Corr
9 November 2001	2	Jackie Collins and Brian Dowling
16 November 2001	3	Olympia Dukakis and Claire Sweeney
23 November 2001	4	Gérard Depardieu, Anne Robinson, and Belinda Carlisle
30 November 2001	5	Morgan Fairchild, Antoine de Caunes, and Emma Bunton
7 December 2001	6	Jerry Hall and Sylvia Kristel
14 December 2001	7	Dolph Lundgren, Matthew Modine, and Loretta Swit
21 December 2001; Christmas special	8	Martine McCutcheon, Alison Moyet, Kate Beckinsale, and S Club 7
18 January 2002	9	Linda Hamilton, Anne Kirkbride, and Eddie Irvine
25 January 2002	10	Natalie Imbruglia and Simon Cowell
1 February 2002	11	Liza Minnelli and Helena Christensen
8 February 2002	12	John Waters, Helena Bonham Carter, Will Young and Gareth Gates
15 February 2002	13	Victoria Beckham and Matthew Kelly
22 February 2002	14	David Hasselhoff, Gaby Roslin and Charlie Brooks
1 March 2002	15	Cilla Black, Cybill Shepherd and Orlando Bloom

== Home media ==
A VHS cassette with the title The Best of So Graham Norton, was made available on VHS cassette in 2000. This was followed by a DVD with the same title in 2004.
