= 1997 in British television =

This is a list of British television related events from 1997.

== Events ==
=== January ===
- 1 January –
  - New Year's Day highlights on BBC1 include a television film adaptation of The Mill on the Floss and Global Sunrise, an 80-minute film presented by Julian Pettifer. It also includes the culmination of a project that saw camera crews at twenty locations around the world on 1 January 1996, recording the rising sun through six continents and all time zones.
  - ITV introduces a third weekly episode of Emmerdale.
- 2 January – Test transmissions begin for Channel 5 in some areas. Details of them are made available on Ceefax page 698 for a few weeks.
- 3 January
  - The final episode in the second run of the game show Celebrity Squares, presented by Bob Monkhouse, is broadcast on ITV, although it will be revived briefly in 2014.
  - The first episode of the ninth series of Wheel of Fortune is broadcast on ITV, with Bradley Walsh taking over as host.
- 5 January – The network television premiere of Jim Sheridan's 1993 biographical drama In the Name of the Father on BBC2, starring Daniel Day-Lewis, Pete Postlethwaite and Emma Thompson.
- 6 January – Channel 4 closes down for the last time with 24-hour transmissions commencing at 6am the following day. Consequently, after nearly 15 years on the air, 4-Tel On View ends.
- 7 January – Carlton presents Monarchy: The Nation Decides, a live studio debate discussing the future of the monarchy in the UK, fronted by Trevor McDonald, John Stapleton, Michele Newman and Roger Cook. Viewers are encouraged to vote on the issue in what is the UK's largest television phone poll. However, Carlton is forced to extend the deadline for calls following complaints from people unable to get through. Of the 2.6 million callers who vote, 66% are in favour of retaining a monarch.
- 8 January – The serialised children's series The Wild House makes its debut on BBC1.
- 9 January – BT releases an advert featuring Letitia Dean and nine other former EastEnders stars in its Friends and Family promotion despite the BBC threatening them with legal action. The BBC subsequently withdraws its threat to sue after BT pays them an undisclosed five-figure amount.
- 11 January – John Fashanu co-hosts his final edition of Gladiators, which is a sports celebrity special. He will return to the show for its final mini-series in 1999.
- 14 January – Viewing figures released for 1996 indicate that BBC1 and BBC2 are the only terrestrial channels to increase their audience share during the year.
- 29 January – Debut of the spoof documentary series Brass Eye on Channel 4.
- 31 January
  - The Independent Television Commission receives two applications for the licence to operate digital terrestrial television in the UK. They come from British Digital Broadcasting (BDB), a joint venture between Carlton, Granada and British Sky Broadcasting (BSkyB) and from Digital Television Network (DTN), a company created by cable operator CableTel, later known as NTL.
  - Details of Channel 5's schedule are leaked to Broadcast magazine. A spokeswoman for the channel confirms the schedule is largely accurate but that the amount of imported content has been distorted: Channel 5's schedule will be made up of 70% UK-produced content.

=== February ===
- 2 February – BBC2 airs George A. Romero's 1978 zombie horror Dawn of the Dead, starring David Emge, Ken Foree, Scott Reiniger and Gaylen Ross.
- 3 February
  - Trouble launches, broadcasting programmes aimed at teenagers and young adults. It shares space with Bravo, the broadcasting hours of which change to 8pm to 6am.
  - The Family Channel relaunches as a game show channel called Challenge TV, although Family Late continues to broadcast as an overnight programming block.
  - Pre-school programmes block Tiny TCC which aired every day from 6am until 9am is transferred to UK Living and is renamed Tiny Living with its airtime being changed to 7am to 9am on weekdays and 7am to 10am during the weekend.
- 5 February – The first Wednesday edition of the National Lottery is broadcast on BBC1 with the introduction of a second weekly draw.
- 5 February – Debut of the comedy sketch series Armstrong and Miller on the Paramount Comedy Channel and later on Channel 4, starring Alexander Armstrong and Ben Miller.
- 9 February – The live final of the 1997 Masters on BBC2 is interrupted by snooker's first ever streaker, twenty-two-year-old secretary Lianne Crofts, who invades the playing area at the beginning of the third frame. After stewards remove her from the arena, Ronnie O'Sullivan amuses the crowd by comically wiping the brow of veteran referee John Street who is refereeing the final match of his career.
- 12 February – Channel 5 releases details of its programme scheduling. It will introduce the concept of stripping and stranding to British television, stripping being where a programme is shown at the same time each day and stranding being where similar programmes are shown at the same time each day. A full schedule is published on 18 February.
- 14 February – The cable-only entertainment channel Carlton Select replaces SelecTV which it acquired when Carlton bought Pearson Television.
- 15 February – The Simpsons is shown for the last time on BBC1 with the episode "Two Cars in Every Garage and Three Eyes on Every Fish".
- 19 February – Ceefax ceases to provide information on Channel 5 test transmissions.
- 21 February – Ornithology series Birding with Bill Oddie is first broadcast on BBC2.
- 24 February – The final episode of the sitcom The Brittas Empire is broadcast on BBC1.
- 28 February – The BBC sells its transmitters and transmission services to Castle Transmission Services for £244 million to help fund its plans for the digital age.
- February – The Paramount Channel relaunches as the Paramount Comedy Channel, a channel dedicated solely to comedy. Previously, the channel had aired drama alongside its comedy output.

=== March ===
- 3 March
  - The snooker series Pot Black returns in a format for veteran players aged over fourteen years in a one year only tournament called Seniors Pot Black which runs for 10 editions for the next two weeks shown on a tea-time slot on BBC2. Regular snooker presenter David Vine hosts the series which featured former champions by now retired Ray Reardon, John Spencer and then current players Dennis Taylor and Terry Griffiths. The title was won by Joe Johnson who never competed in the original series.
  - Dave Spikey becomes the sixth host for the final series of the ITV weekday morning game show Chain Letters in the same year as its tenth anniversary.
- 4 March – The BBC and Flextech agree on a deal to provide BBC-branded channels. BBC Showcase, for entertainment, BBC Horizon, for documentaries, BBC Style for lifestyle programming, BBC Learning for schools and BBC Arena for the arts, plus three other channels: BBC Catch-Up for repeats of programmes within days of their original broadcast; a dedicated BBC Sport channel; and a television version of Radio 1.
- 8 March – ITV takes over the television rights to Formula One after eighteen years of coverage on the BBC. It shows full coverage of qualifying as well as the race itself, something that the BBC generally did not do, although it is also criticised for showing advertisement breaks during the races.
- 10 March – The Simpsons is moved from BBC1 to BBC2 and is shown between Monday and Friday at 6pm.
- 14 March – Among the highlights of this year's Comic Relief telethon is Prime Cracker, a short spoof crossover of ITV stablemate crime dramas Prime Suspect and Cracker, starring Helen Mirren and Robbie Coltrane as their respective characters.
- 18 March – The final episode of Come Outside is broadcast on BBC2.
- 21 March – Campaign magazine reports that the BBC and Flextech have ratified their joint venture. They will create two new operational ventures, one that will develop and launch subscription channels in the UK and Ireland and one that will acquire and run UK Gold.
- 23 March
  - The science documentary The Language Master makes its debut on BBC2 in which language teacher Michel Thomas teaches French to sixth form students for five days at a further education college in London. As a result of the interest generated by this documentary, the publisher Hodder & Stoughton commissions Thomas to produce commercial versions of his courses.
  - Debut on ITV of the long-running crime drama Midsomer Murders, starring John Nettles.
- 25 March – ITV's Network First strand presents a ground-breaking documentary about Edinburgh's Royal Blind School, a boarding school for visually impaired students.
- 26 March – The network television premiere on ITV of Alan J. Pakula's 1993 American thriller The Pelican Brief, based on John Grisham's novel of the same name starring Julia Roberts and Denzel Washington.
- 28 March – The final episode of the children's series Playdays is broadcast on BBC2.
- 30 March
  - Channel 5, the UK's fifth and last analogue terrestrial channel, launches at 6pm. The first faces seen are the Spice Girls who perform 1-2-3-4-5, a rewritten version of Manfred Mann's 1964 song 5-4-3-2-1. The opening night's highlights include the launch of a new daily soap Family Affairs and The Jack Docherty Show, a weeknight chat show based on the format of American shows such as The Late Show with David Letterman.
  - Sky1 airs "The Springfield Files", a crossover episode of The Simpsons with The X-Files, featuring the guest voices of David Duchovny and Gillian Anderson as FBI agents Fox Mulder and Dana Scully, as well as Star Trek's Leonard Nimoy, who appears as himself to feature numerous references of the series.
  - ITV airs the comedy pilot Cold Feet. It returns for a full series the following year and runs until 2003. It will be revived in 2016 for four series.
- 31 March
  - The preschool children's series Teletubbies makes its debut on BBC2.
  - The game show Blockbusters relaunches on BBC2, presented by Michael Aspel. This is the first version featuring adult contestants and the only version to have purple rather than blue hexagons while retaining the same format. The series continues until 28 August.
  - BBC1 airs a made-for-television version of Michael Flatley's musical Lord of the Dance. The programme is shown on the same evening that Channel 4 airs a relaunched version of Riverdance featuring Colin Dunne and Jean Butler.
  - Channel 5 becomes the subject of a ratings war with all major channels adopting aggressive scheduling to retain viewers. As well as Lord of the Dance, BBC1 airs two episodes of EastEnders and the thriller Malice, while ITV screens five films, including Ace Ventura: Pet Detective and RoboCop 2. Channel 4 has the films The Goodbye Girl and Breakheart Pass.
  - The inaugural edition of 5 News features an interview with Labour Party leader Tony Blair.
  - Among the new shows that make their debut on Channel 5 today are the game shows 100% and Whittle as well as Hot Property and the children's programming block Milkshake!.
  - Debut of BBC World's flagship interview series HARDtalk.

=== April ===
- 1 April
  - At 4:40am, Channel 5 begins a rerun of the Australian soap Prisoner: Cell Block H. This is the series' first networked broadcast in the UK as during its earlier run on ITV, scheduling of the show had varied from region to region.
  - Quincy, a series that was previously shown on ITV, begins airing on BBC1 as part of their daytime schedule.
- 3 April
  - BBC1 airs Episode 2710 of Neighbours in which the character Cheryl Stark, played by Caroline Gillmer, is killed when she is hit by a vehicle while trying to cross a road to save her daughter. Scenes involving the accident are censored by the BBC before the episode is broadcast. Five seconds of the episode had also been cut before it aired in Australia in September 1996.
  - Postman Pat returns for a new series of 13 episodes on BBC1, copyrighted the previous year. Two special episodes are aired two and a half years prior to making another 15 episodes in total.
  - As a build up to the World Snooker Championship which was taking place at the Crucible Theatre in Sheffield for the 21st year, BBC2 airs a three part series Snooker: the Crucible – 21 Years in the Frame about the celebration of the championship by featuring the last 20 years of the event.
  - The Learning Channel is renamed Discovery Home & Leisure.
- 5 April
  - The 1997 Grand National is delayed after a suspected IRA bomb threat. The race is eventually run on 7 April at 5pm. It is the last of 50 Nationals, including the void race of 1993, to be commentated by Peter O'Sullevan.
  - Debut on Channel 5 of the music game show Night Fever, presented by Suggs.
  - Debut on BBC1 of the game show Whatever You Want, presented by Gaby Roslin.
- 5–6 April – BBC1 airs a two-part adaptation of The Ice House, the debut novel of crime writer Minette Walters. The miniseries stars Daniel Craig, Corin Redgrave, Kitty Aldridge and Frances Barber.
- 6 April
  - The network television premiere on Channel 5 of Chris Columbus's 1993 American comedy drama Mrs. Doubtfire, starring Robin Williams.
  - Debut on ITV of the drama series Where the Heart Is.
- 7 April
  - Debut on BBC1 of the children's game show 50/50, presented by Sally Gray.
  - HTV's main evening news programme is renamed The West Tonight, as the change coincides with the opening of a digital broadcast centre at Bristol studios.
  - Peter Baldwin makes his final appearance as character Derek Wilton in Coronation Street, having appeared on and off since 1976, with Derek dying of a heart attack following a road rage incident. The character is axed in a high-profile cull by producer Brian Park.
- 8 April
  - BBC journalist Martin Bell announces that he is to stand as a candidate against Neil Hamilton in the Tatton constituency on an anti-corruption platform.
  - The American/Canadian children's animated series Arthur makes its UK debut on BBC1.
- 12 April – The final edition of the game show You Bet! is broadcast on ITV after 9 years on the air.
- 13 April – The network television premiere of Brian Gibson's 1993 biographical drama What's Love Got to Do with It on Channel 4, based on the life of the legendary American singer Tina Turner and stars Angela Bassett, Laurence Fishburne and Vanessa Bell Calloway.
- 14 April – June Brown returns to EastEnders as Dot Cotton after a four-year break.
- 15 April – The Bookmark documentary film The Thomas the Tank Engine Man airs on BBC2 again as a tribute to the author and creator of The Railway Series and Thomas the Tank Engine & Friends, the Rev. W. Awdry, who died in his home in Stroud, Gloucestershire after being bedridden and suffering from health problems on 21 March.
- 16 April – The network television premiere on ITV of Andrew Davis's 1993 American action thriller The Fugitive, starring Harrison Ford and Tommy Lee Jones.
- 23 April – Channel 5 launches on satellite so that the third of the UK who live outside of its broadcast area can view the newly launched channel.
- 25 April – The final edition of the daytime game show Chain Letters is broadcast on ITV after almost ten years on the air.
- 27 April – The BBC confirms that the comedy duo Hale and Pace have signed a £1 million two-year deal that will see them move from ITV.

=== May ===
- 1 May – General election night: for the first time, brothers David and Jonathan Dimbleby anchor rival results programmes on BBC1 and ITV, respectively. The same arrangement will occur for the General Elections in 2001 and 2005.
- 2 May – The network television premiere of Falling Down on BBC1, a 1993 American action thriller starring Michael Douglas, Robert Duvall and Barbara Hershey.
- 3 May – Katrina and the Waves win the Eurovision Song Contest (staged in Dublin) with the song "Love Shine a Light", the first time the UK has won the competition since 1981.
- 5 May – ITV premiers the 1990 animated Disney film, DuckTales the Movie: Treasure of the Lost Lamp.
- 6 May – The 15th series of ITV Central's The Cook Report kicked off with Roger Cook investigating the controversial practice of canned hunting.
- 10 May – Debut on BBC1 of the crime mystery series Jonathan Creek, starring Alan Davies as the titular character.
- 13 May – Jeremy Paxman speaks to Michael Howard on Newsnight on BBC2 and the interview becomes the programme's most notorious. Howard, who had been Home Secretary until thirteen days earlier, had held a meeting with Derek Lewis, head of the Prison Service, about the possible dismissal of the governor of Parkhurst Prison, John Marriott. Howard, having given evasive answers, was asked by Paxman the same question, "Did you threaten to overrule him [Lewis]?", a total of twelve times in succession, 14 if the first two enquiries worded somewhat differently and some time before the succession of 12 are included. Howard did not give a direct answer, instead repeatedly saying that he "did not overrule him" and ignoring the "threaten" part of the question. Howard finally answers Paxman's question on his final edition of Newsnight in 2014, saying "No, Jeremy, I didn't. But feel free to ask another eleven times."
- 21 May – Serena Martin wins the 1997 series of Junior MasterChef on BBC1.
- 23 May – The long-running Channel 4 game show Countdown celebrates its 2000th edition with a special retrospective programme.
- 24–26 May – Channel 4 dedicates the Spring Bank Holiday weekend to sitcoms. It features classic episodes, 1970s spin-off films and documentaries about the genre's appeal.
- 25 May – The network television premiere of John Waters 1994 American black comedy Serial Mom on Channel 4, starring Kathleen Turner, Sam Waterston and Ricki Lake.
- 26 May – BBC1 airs the documentary Lenny's Big Amazon Adventure, which sees Lenny Henry travel to Peru with survival expert Lofty Wiseman.
- 30 May
  - The network television premiere on Channel 5 of Russell Mulcahy's 1993 American crime caper The Real McCoy, starring Kim Basinger, Val Kilmer and Terence Stamp.
  - ITV airs a one-off special programme, Kids Behaving Badly: Richard Madeley and Judy Finnigan present a live debate spotlighting lawlessness among Britain's youth with video evidence of juvenile crime and live links to troubled areas.
  - The network television premiere on BBC1 of Carl Reiner's 1993 American spoof erotic thriller Fatal Instinct, starring Armand Assante, Sherilyn Fenn, Kate Nelligan and Sean Young.
- 31 May
  - Michael Grade steps down from the role of Chief Executive of Channel 4. He is succeeded by Michael Jackson who takes over the following day.
  - Channel 5 airs its first international football coverage, a match between England and Poland. The channel experiments with a new presenting format which tries to recreate the atmosphere of a bar with presenters supplying coverage against the backdrop of chatter from an invited audience. The format draws criticism with Glenn Moore of The Independent describing it as a "shambles". However, the coverage gives the channel its largest audience so far with a viewership of five million.

=== June ===
- 2 June – BBC Breakfast News is given a revamp. Its studio and theme tune change. It is now known as Breakfast News, rather than BBC Breakfast News.
- 4 June – Magdalen College, Oxford wins the 1996–97 series of University Challenge on BBC2, beating The Open University 250–195.
- 7 June
  - Debut on BBC1 of the dating game show The Other Half, presented by Dale Winton.
  - Faye Dempsey wins the eighth series of Stars in Their Eyes on ITV, performing as Olivia Newton-John.
- 8 June
  - The last football match commentated by Jock Brown for BBC Scotland which is a World Cup qualifier with Scotland playing away to Belarus to win 1–0. Brown leaves the station at the end of the month to take a role as general manager at Celtic FC.
  - The network television premiere on BBC2 of Brian De Palma's 1983 American gangster thriller remake Scarface as part of the Moviedrome strand, starring Al Pacino, Michelle Pfeiffer, Robert Loggia, Mary Elizabeth Mastrantonio, Steven Bauer and F. Murray Abraham.
- 10 June
  - BBC2 airs the documentary Homeground: An Exile's Return, telling the story of Martin McGartland, a former British agent who infiltrated the Provisional Irish Republican Army.
  - Debut of the docusoap Driving School on BBC1.
- 11 June – SMG buys Grampian Television, the ITV contractor for Northern Scotland, for £105 million.
- 18 June – The final episode of the supernatural soap Springhill is broadcast on Sky1.
- 19 June – Media agencies reject Granada Group chairman Gerry Robinson's call for the formation of a single ITV company, expressing concerns it would be extremely damaging to advertisers.
- 25 June
  - The Independent Television Commission awards the sole digital terrestrial television broadcast licence to British Digital Broadcasting.
  - Classic children's character Captain Pugwash is announced as being brought back for a new series after The Britt Allcroft Company purchased the rights to the character. The new series will be animated using digital animation.
- 26 June – Yorkshire-Tyne Tees Television plc is acquired by Granada Group plc.
- 30 June – BBC1 airs a day of coverage of the Hong Kong handover ceremony, marking the transfer of sovereignty over Hong Kong from the United Kingdom to China, an event that happens at midnight local time, which is 5pm in the UK.

=== July ===
- 1 July – MTV launches on all satellite and cable platforms in the UK and Ireland. It replaces the pan-European service and is part of a strategy which sees localised MTV channels launch across Europe.
- 3 July – After 17 years, Peter Snow presents Newsnight for the last time, although he will continue to make occasional appearances as a political analyst until 2005.
- 4 July – The Battersby family, described by the media as a "family from hell", makes its debut in Coronation Street.
- 5 July – ITV airs the comedy pilot The Grimleys. A full series begins in 1999 and runs until 2001.
- 11 July – Debut on BBC1 of Celebrity Ready Steady Cook, presented by Fern Britton.
- 12 July
  - The network television premiere on BBC1 of John Woo's 1993 American action thriller Hard Target, starring Jean-Claude Van Damme.
  - The US fantasy series Xena: Warrior Princess makes its UK debut on Channel 5, starring Lucy Lawless as the titular character.
- 14 July – Debut of the ...from Hell documentary series on ITV.
- 18 July – The network television premiere of Bernard Rose's 1992 American horror Candyman on Channel 4, starring Virginia Madsen, Tony Todd, Xander Berkeley, Kasi Lemmons and Vanessa Williams.
- 25 July
  - Channel 5 announces plans to run an advertising campaign on ITV in order to attract more viewers.
  - The network television premiere of Clive Barker's 1987 supernatural horror Hellraiser on Channel 4, starring Andrew Robinson, Clare Higgins, Ashley Laurence and Doug Bradley.
- 26 July – Midlands Today presenter Alan Towers announces live on air that he is leaving the programme after 25 years in broadcast journalism, describing BBC bosses as "pygmies in grey suits wearing blindfolds".

=== August ===
- 1 August – The US animated series King of the Hill makes its UK debut on Channel 4.
- 3 August – Julie Friend wins the 1997 series of MasterChef on BBC1.
- 7 August – The final episode of This Life is broadcast on BBC2.
- 8 August – The children's animated series Postman Pat has been snapped up by Premiere 12 for broadcasting in Singapore.
- 24 August – Sky1 airs a special episode of The Simpsons, in which Troy McClure introduces three spin-off segments including references to many different television series, as well as American comedian and actor Tim Conway, who makes a guest appearance as himself.
- 26 August
  - It is reported that former Grandstand presenter Helen Rollason has been diagnosed with cancer and will undergo emergency surgery.
  - Debut of the fly-on-the-wall documentary series Vets in Practice on BBC1.
- 31 August
  - Sky2 and Granada Talk TV both cease broadcasting.
  - BBC1 interrupts the late-night film Borsalino to bring a newsflash about Diana, Princess of Wales's car crash. The film then resumes until the end, while another newsflash airs on BBC2 after their late-night film Reds. When it is time for BBC1 to closedown, they don't, instead staying on the air throughout the night, simulcasting with BBC World News to bring updates of the car crash and Diana's subsequent death, which is announced at 5am, while BBC2 closes down as usual, after the Weatherview bulletin. At 6am, a rolling news programme, first anchored by Martyn Lewis and from 1pm by Peter Sissons, is shown on both BBC1 and BBC2 until the latter breaks away at 3pm to provide alternative programming (a shortened Sunday Grandstand, BBC1 leftover Countryfile, documentary The Restless Year, the premiere of Full Circle with Michael Palin (another BBC1 programme, which is repeated on BBC1 the following Sunday), Stephen Hawking's Universe (which is the only scheduled programme of all the BBC television channels to air on its intended channel, but delayed by the aformentioned Full Circle with Michael Palin), The Natural World, Everyman, which is also a BBC1 leftover, and ending with the film Ring of Bright Water). BBC1 continues to provide coverage until closedown when it once again hands over to BBC World News. A weather bulletin, presented by John Kettley, is the only non-Diana related programme to air on BBC1 on that day. ITV initially continues with its normal late night programming (only making a newsflash during a commercial break of Night of the Hunter on London News Network's ITV Night Time) before interrupting a repeat of The Chart Show (also on ITV Night Time) to commence open-ended news coverage from ITN shortly before her death is announced, anchored by Dermot Murnaghan and Nicholas Owen. After handing over to GMTV at 6am (who runs in its weekday length), its unbroken news coverage of the tragedy resumes at 9:25am and lasts well into the evening (with an interruption for the lunchtime children's current affairs programme Straight Up!) with Coronation Street, Heartbeat and the film Sharpe's Eagle being the only scheduled programmes airing that day. Among the programmes to be pulled from the day's schedule are Open University programming, Children's BBC, Breakfast with Frost, See Hear, Snowy River: the McGregor Saga, both of that day's EastEnders omnibus, Escape to Athena, Songs of Praise, the American game show Singled Out, Oh, Doctor Beeching!, Star Trek: Voyager, The Outer Limits, Airplane II: The Sequel, Reality Bites, Goin' South and The Doors on BBC1 and 2 respectively, and Survival Special, Alright on the Night's Cock-Up Trip, and The Deadly Companions on ITV.

=== September ===
- 1 September
  - Television schedules continues to change following the death of Diana, Princess of Wales. BBC1's day starts with Breakfast News being extended to four hours, dropping Business Breakfast, Can't Cook Won't Cook and makeover series Style Challenge, with Kilroy starting ten minutes later than billed. The programme runs for fifty mintes (instead of its usal thirty-five minute slot), removing the design show Change That from the schedule. A news special, presented by Martyn Lewis, replaces the 11am summary and consumer affairs series The Really Useful Show. The household makeover programme Room for Improvement then becomes the first no-news or weather programme to air on BBC1 since Diana's death was announced the previous day, while Going for a Song replaces Call My Bluff in the schedule. The former game show was scheduled to air after the latter programme, but due to the One o'Clock News (also anchored by Martyn Lewis) airing a fifty-minute edition, Going for a Song is now followed by the lunchtime showing of Neighbours. The extended lunchtime bulletin leads to weather news magazine The Weather Show airing twenty minutes later than billed. It was then followed by previous day's leftovers Snowy River: the McGregor Saga and a special edition of the book programme The Bookworm about the nation's favourite children's book. Those programs drops American series Quincy and Through the Keyhole. The Children's BBC programming block and the afternoon showing of Neighbours airs in their planned slot and Six O'Clock News (anchored by Lewis and Diana Madill) runs for thirty-five minutes (instead of its usal thirty minutes), with the regional news magazines being shown five minutes later than billed. This Is Your Life, Mastermind, EastEnders and Only Fools and Horses all air in their scheduled time, before the Nine O'Clock News (anchored by Peter Sissons) also runs a fifty-minute edition. It is followed by a documentary named Diana: The People's Princess, which is narrated by Gavin Hewitt. Both programmes replaces the premiere of Bloomin' Marvellous, which is postponed to the following Monday. A delayed showing of Preston Front replaces the repeat of the premiere of Full Circle with Michael Palin, which was not shown on BBC1 the previous day. After the showing of Film 97 with Barry Norman, another newsflash was shown, followed by reflections and the showing of The Sheepman, which replaces the initially scheduled late-night film Body Parts. ITV also makes a morning news special with Dermot Murnaghan and Nicholas Owen in place of Supermarket Sweep, while the lunchtime bulletin was extended, leading to Home and Away being showed thirty-five minutes later that planned. Other changes includes the early evening bulletin being extended to fifty minutes, leading to regional news magazine being shown thirty minutes later than billed, dropping as a result Talking Telephone Numbers, and the replacement of Michael Barrymore's Strike It Rich and film Police Academy 6: City Under Siege by a repeat of the Inspector Morse episode "Absolute Conviction". In addition, News at Ten runs a forty-five minute edition, leading to the late regional news airing fifteen minutes later than billed.
  - The National Geographic Channel is launched. It is an evening-only service, on air each day from 7.00 o'clock until 1.00 o'clock.
  - Channel 5's The Jack Docherty Show returns after the summer break with a relaunch which includes new music and titles. The Friday edition is also dropped at Docherty's suggestion, ending the original five-nights-a-week format.
  - Magnus Magnusson hosts his final episode of Mastermind on BBC1. John Humphrys would succeed him upon its return in 2003.
- 5 September – There is further programme changes on the eve of Diana, Princess of Wales's funeral. BBC1 and ITV airs the royal family returning to London, dropping as a result Quincy, Through the Keyhole and Playdays (shown on Children's BBC) on the former and local programming on the latter. At 6pm, Queen Elizabeth II addresses the nation with a special broadcast in which she pays tribute to Diana, which is only the second time she has done so. The address is broadcast live at 6.00pm, ahead of BBC1's early evening news broadcasts, and following ITV's newscast. As a result, BBC1's Six o'Clock News (anchored by Anna Ford and Diana Madill) airs a forty-five minute edition, with local newscasts airing fifteen minutes later than scheduled. It was then followed by a newsflash by Peter Sissons, which announces the death of Mother Teresa and by Weekend Watchdog. A news special, presented by David Dimbleby, sends Top of the Pops to BBC2 and cancels Vets in Practice and a repeat of Keeping Up Appearances. The Nine o'Clock News is extended to forty minutes, followed by Dangerfield (shown ten minutes later that billed), another David Dimbleby news special, and reflections about the late princess. A Parkinson interview, which was displaced from its original timeslot by the aformentioned news special, then airs on the channel. It was then followed by Casablanca, which starred Ingrid Bergman, which was the subject of that Parkinson interview. As a result, both late-night movies (Freejack and Hands of the Ripper) were dropped from the schedule. On ITV, that evening's showing of Home and Away was moved before the early evening news, instead of following it. Instead, the local news programming block is extended to fifty minutes, instead of its usual thirty-five minutes length. It was followed by the already scheduled Bruce's Price is Right and Coronation Street. ITV then airs a hour news special following both of these programmes, with The Bill airing one hour later than planned. The final edition of Surprise! Surprise! was dropped, as well as a repeat of Tarrant's 10 Years on TV, which was replaced by another news special. Finally, on Channel 5, the premiere of a revival of Name That Tune is replaced by the entertainment programme Exclusive, which was due to follow the game show. The channel then shows their news special, also dropping the travel review programme Attractions and their 8.30pm news bulletin.
- 6 September – The live broadcast of the funeral of Diana, Princess of Wales is watched by 32.10 million viewers in the United Kingdom. It is the country's second most-watched broadcast of all time, behind 1966's World Cup final.
- 9 September – The network television premiere on ITV of the 1993 American crime drama A Perfect World, starring Kevin Costner, Clint Eastwood and Laura Dern.
- 10 September – BBC2 begins showing the six-part documentary series The Nazis: A Warning from History, which examines the rise and fall of the Nazi Party in Germany. The final part is aired on 15 October.
- 11 September – The US sitcom Suddenly Susan makes its UK debut on Sky1, starring Brooke Shields.
- 12 September – The former ITV game show Name That Tune returns for a new series on Channel 5, presented by Jools Holland. The revival was delayed by a week due to death of Diana, Princess of Wales.
- 13 September
  - Gladiators returns to ITV for its sixth series, delayed by a week following schedule changes in the light of the funeral of Diana, Princess of Wales the previous Saturday. England rugby union player Jeremy Guscott joins the show as new co-host to Ulrika Jonsson.
  - The network television premiere on ITV of the 1991 American romantic drama The Prince of Tides, starring Barbra Streisand and Nick Nolte.
- 14 September – Gumby: The Movie is broadcast on The Disney Channel, marking the only time Gumby is aired in the UK.
- 16 September
  - The BBC announces a radical shake-up of news and current affairs programming that will see television and radio news services produced by the same production teams.
  - BBC1 airs the documentary series Holiday Memories, in which presenter Esther Rantzen revisits Zimbabwe with her daughter. She becomes severely ill after filming the episode and is subsequently diagnosed with Giardiasis. She is absent from her BBC2 afternoon talk show Esther for a few months while recovering from the condition, returning to television in early 1998.
- 19 September – Debut of the garden makeover series Ground Force on BBC2, presented by Alan Titchmarsh, Charlie Dimmock and Tommy Walsh.
- 20 September – Debut of the BBC promotional film featuring a version of Lou Reed's 1972 song "Perfect Day" performed by various artists including David Bowie, Bono, Brett Anderson and Laurie Anderson. Owing to its popularity, the version is released as a single on 17 November with sales benefiting Children in Need. The song ultimately spends three weeks at the top of the UK Singles Chart and raises £2,125,000 for Children in Need. By November 2016, it has sold 1.54 million copies, despite not being available for download.
- 22–25 September – EastEnders airs a series of episodes from Ireland which attract criticism from viewers and the Irish embassy because of their negative and stereotypical portrayal of Irish people. The BBC later issues an apology for any offence the episodes caused.
- 29 September – Two new children's animated series, The Enchanted Lands (based on the book series The Faraway Tree and The Wishing Chair by Enid Blyton) and Noah's Island, made by Telemagination, the company behind The Animals of Farthing Wood, make their debuts on BBC1. Both of the series first aired in Ireland, prior to airing in their homeland.

=== October ===
- 3 October – The 'Virtual Globe' ident is seen for the final time on BBC1 after six years in use.
- 4 October
  - BBC One launches its new hot air balloon globe idents to coincide with the introduction of the network's new corporate logo. Also on this day, new idents feature on BBC Two alongside the existing ones first seen in 1991 with the new logo.
  - BBC2 begins showing the six-part documentary series Clive Barker's A-Z of Horror, written and presented by the acclaimed horror author and director Clive Barker.
- 11 October – ITV airs delayed coverage of England's final qualifying match for the 1998 FIFA World Cup against Italy in Rome which is shown exclusively live this evening on Sky Sports. The goalless draw is enough to qualify England for next summer's tournament.
- 14 October – Debut of the football-based drama series Dream Team on Sky One.
- 16 October – Emmerdale celebrates its 25th anniversary.
- 19 October
  - After four years of only showing it on FA Cup weekends, The repeat broadcast of the previous day's Match of the Day is now being shown every Sunday morning on BBC1 with Premier League highlights as well.
  - The network television premiere of Steven Spielberg's 1993 Oscar-winning drama Schindler's List on BBC One, based on the novel Schindler's Ark by Thomas Keneally starring Liam Neeson, Ben Kingsley and Ralph Fiennes. The film is followed by an interview with Spielberg and a profile of Oskar Schindler.
  - Debut of Lynda La Plante's police procedural series Trial & Retribution on ITV, which makes frequent use of the split-screen format.
- 27 October – UK Living changes its name to Living to distance itself from the forthcoming UKTV network.
- 30 October – BBC One airs Clive Anderson's interview with the Bee Gees which ends with them storming out of the studio. He repeatedly jokes about their life and career throughout the interview, but they decide to leave after he refers to them as "tossers".
- 31 October – Queen Elizabeth II opens a £5.5 million interactive visitors centre, the BBC Experience at Broadcasting House. The venture proves to be loss-making for the corporation and is closed in 2001.

=== November ===
- 1 November
  - The UKTV network is launched. Existing channel UK Gold is joined by UK Horizons, UK Arena and UK Style. The channels' full broadcast hours are available only on cable due to limited capacity on satellite.
  - The Movie Channel is rebranded under the Sky Movies banner, now called Sky Movies Screen 1 and Sky Movies Screen 2.
- 2 November – The network television premiere on BBC2 of Quentin Tarantino's 1994 critically acclaimed thriller Pulp Fiction, starring John Travolta, Samuel L. Jackson, Bruce Willis and Uma Thurman.
- 3 November – Debut on BBC Two of the sitcom I'm Alan Partridge, starring Steve Coogan.
- 4 November – BBC News Online is launched, BBC News having previously created special websites for the 1995 budget as well as this year's 1 May general election and the death of Diana, Princess of Wales.
- 9 November – At 6pm, BBC News 24 is launched, but only on cable. It is the BBC's first new channel since BBC Two in 1964. It also broadcasts on BBC One through the night after closedown.
- 12 November – The network television premiere on ITV of In the Line of Fire, starring Clint Eastwood.
- 20 November – BBC One airs live coverage of the service of thanksgiving marking the golden wedding anniversary of Queen Elizabeth II and Prince Philip, held at Westminster Abbey.
- 21 November – For the first time, Children in Need has its own website, which is launched at 4pm ahead of the evening's telethon on BBC One.
- 26 November – The network television premiere on Channel 4 of Trainspotting, starring Ewan McGregor.
- November – The BBC introduces regional news and sports pages to Ceefax. This is the first time that any part of the Ceefax service has been regionalised.

=== December ===
- 1 December
  - Sky Box Office is relaunched with four movies-on-demand channels.
  - Konnie Huq presents her first episode of the long-running children's series Blue Peter on BBC1. She will go on to be the longest-running female presenter and the third longest overall in the show's history, presenting for ten years before leaving in January 2008.
- 2 December – Is Painting Dead?, a discussion on ITV following this year's Turner Prize award, becomes notorious for artist Tracey Emin appearing drunk and storming off.
- 5 December – The Canadian/German science-fiction series Lexx makes its UK debut on Channel 5.
- 7 December
  - The Teletubbies, the characters from the BBC children's series that first went on the air at the end of March, are at number one in the UK Singles Chart with their debut single "Teletubbies say "Eh-oh!"". The track is a contender for the coveted Christmas number one, but that title is taken by the Spice Girls with "Too Much".
  - Jeremy Beadle presents his final edition of You've Been Framed! on ITV.
- 9 December
  - CNBC Europe announces its intention to merge with the Dow Jones news channel in Europe, European Business News.
  - The final episode of Soldier Soldier is broadcast on ITV.
- 14 December – The US/Canadian science-fiction series Earth: Final Conflict makes its UK debut on Sky One.
- 16 December – The last regular edition of The Cook Report airs on ITV; the show will continue to air as one hour specials until 1999.
- 20 December – The ITC award the three pay-television digital multiplex licences to British Digital Broadcasting.
- 24 December
  - Christmas Eve highlights on BBC One include the 1994 comedy film Naked Gun 33 1/3: The Final Insult, starring Leslie Nielsen.
  - Christmas Eve on ITV has the terrestrial premiere of the 1992 Christmas film sequel Home Alone 2: Lost in New York, again starring Macaulay Culkin, Joe Pesci and Daniel Stern.
  - Christmas Eve highlights on Channel 5 include Tim Vine's Christmas Present, an Andy Williams Show-style programme of festive music and guests.
- 25 December
  - Christmas Day highlights on BBC One include the network television premieres of the 1994 live action The Flintstones film, starring John Goodman and Elizabeth Taylor and the 1994 Superhero comedy film The Mask, starring Jim Carrey.
  - ITV show the network premiere of the 1992 family Christmas film The Muppet Christmas Carol, starring Michael Caine.
- 26 December
  - Boxing Day highlights on BBC One include Steven Spielberg's 1991 Peter Pan film Hook starring Dustin Hoffman and Robin Williams, James Cameron's 1994 action blockbuster True Lies starring Arnold Schwarzenegger and Jamie Lee Curtis and the 1993 comedy sequel Beethoven's 2nd starring Charles Grodin. Paul McCartney's Standing Stones, the Documentary and Unplugged: Oasis are also shown.
  - After a seven-year absence, the game show Blankety Blank returns to BBC One, presented by Lily Savage.
  - The network television premiere of Nell on Channel 4, starring Jodie Foster, Liam Neeson and Natasha Richardson.
- 27 December – Channel 4 airs an evening of programmes chosen by its viewers. The line-up includes episodes of Brookside, Friends, Father Ted, Cutting Edge and Whose Line is it Anyway?, as well as the film Shallow Grave starring Ewan McGregor.
- 28 December – BBC One airs a two-part adaptation of The Woman in White, based on the novel of the same name. The second part is shown the following day.
- 29 December
  - The final episode of Talking Telephone Numbers is broadcast on ITV.
  - Telly Addicts returns to BBC One after a year long break with a celebrity special. The show is heavily revamped with completely new games now played by three pairs of players rather than two teams of four as before. Regular editions of the new-look show will begin to be shown in the following spring.
- 31 December – BBC One airs Cold Enough for Snow, the sequel to Jack Rosenthal's 1996 comedy Eskimo Day.
- December – The first series of Robot Wars begins filming in London, continuing into January 1998, with the first episode airing on BBC Two on 20 February 1998.

=== Unknown ===
- Michael Jackson is appointed Chief Executive of Channel 4.
- Chris Smith, the Secretary of State for Culture, Media and Sport, announces that Channel 4's funding formula with ITV will be abolished from 1998.

== Debuts ==
=== BBC1/One ===
- 1 January – The Mill on the Floss (1997)
- 6 January – Gadget Boy & Heather (1995–1998)
- 7 January
  - The Prince of Atlantis (1997)
  - Hububb (1997–2001)
- 8 January – The Wild House (1997–1999)
- 12 January – Ivanhoe (1997)
- 19 February – Insiders (1997)
- 20 February – Chalk (1997)
- 27 February – A Perfect State (1997)
- 1 March – Crime Traveller (1997)
- 15 March – Have Your Cake and Eat It (1997)
- 29 March – The Missing Postman (1997)
- 3 April – No Sweat (1997–1998)
- 5 April
  - The Ice House (1997)
  - Whatever You Want (1997–2000)
- 7 April – 50/50 (1997–2005)
- 8 April – Arthur (1996–2021)
- 17 April – Keeping Mum (1997–1998)
- 22 April – Breakout (1997)
- 4 May – The Heart Surgeon (1997)
- 10 May – Jonathan Creek (1997–2004, 2009–2016)
- 18 May – Plotlands (1997)
- 20 May – Plasmo (1997)
- 25 May – Born to Run (1997)
- 30 May – Drovers' Gold (1997)
- 7 June – The Other Half (1997–2002)
- 10 June – Driving School (1997)
- 17 June – The Broker's Man (1997–1998)
- 11 July – Celebrity Ready Steady Cook (1997–2003)
- 21 July – Match of the Eighties (1997)
- 31 July – Pilgrim's Rest (1997)
- 24 August – The Beggar Bride (1997)
- 26 August – Vets in Practice (1997–2002)
- 31 August – Full Circle with Michael Palin (1997)
- 8 September – Bloomin' Marvellous (1997)
- 14 September – The Lakes (1997, 1999)
- 15 September – A Prince Among Men (1997–1998)
- 25 September
  - Dad (1997–1999)
  - The Locksmith (1997)
- 29 September – Noah's Island (1997–1999)
- 4 October – The Fix (1997)
- 11 October – Bright Hair (1997)
- 2 November – Get Well Soon (1997)
- 3 November – Hotel (1997)
- 9 November – The History of Tom Jones: A Foundling (1997)
- 10 November – Spark (1997)
- 16 November – The Phoenix and the Carpet (1997)
- 29 November – The Student Prince (1997)
- 2 December – Aquila (1997–1998)
- 28 December – The Woman in White (1997)
- 31 December – Cold Enough For Snow (1997)

=== BBC2/Two ===
- 7 January – Grown Ups (1997)
- 1 February – Nostromo (1997)
- 21 February – Birding with Bill Oddie (1997–2000)
- 24 February – Ray Mears' World of Survival (1997–1998)
- 31 March – Teletubbies (1997–2001, 2002, 2007, 2012, 2015–2018)
- 14 April – Look and Read: Captain Crimson (1997)
- 18 April – Sunnyside Farm (1997)
- 1 June – The Magical Adventures of Quasimodo (1996)
- 2 September – Holding On (1997)
- 5 September – VR.5 (1995)
- 10 September – The Nazis: A Warning from History (1997)
- 19 September – Ground Force (1997–2005)
- 4 October – Clive Barker's A-Z of Horror (1997–1998)
- 28 October – Back to the Floor (1997–2002)
- 3 November – I'm Alan Partridge (1997–2002)
- 9 November – Profit (1996)
- 17 November – Land of the Tiger (1997)
- 7 December – Love Bites (3 single dramas – Bumping the Odds, In Your Dreams and The Perfect Blue) (1997)
- 22 December – Stella Street (1997–2001)
- 28 December – Mothertime (1997)
- 29 December – Operation Good Guys (1997–2000)

=== BBC News 24 ===
- 31 March – HARDtalk (1997–2025)
- 9 November – BBC World News (1991–present)

=== ITV ===
- 5 January – Rebecca (1997)
- 6 January
  - Sooty's Amazing Adventures (1997–1998)
  - Adam's Family Tree (1997–1999)
- 7 January – Quayside (1997)
- 8 January – The Blobs (1997–1998)
- 18 January – The Place of the Dead (1997)
- 24 January – Holding the Baby (1997–1998)
- 5 February – Supply & Demand (1997–1998)
- 6 February – Reckless (1997)
- 24 February – Snap (1997–1999)
- 25 February – No Child of Mine (1997)
- 26 February – Dr. Xargle (1997–1998)
- 28 February – Slim Pig (1996–2005)
- 8 March – Formula One coverage on ITV (1997–2008)
- 9 March – Jane Eyre (1997)
- 23 March – Midsomer Murders (1997–present)
- 30 March
  - Cold Feet (1997–2003, 2016–2020)
  - Comedy Premieres (1997)
- 2 April – The Vanishing Man (1997–1998)
- 4 April – The Grand (1997–1998)
- 6 April – Where the Heart Is (1997–2006)
- 29 April – Touching Evil (1997–1999)
- 3 May – Mashed (1997–1998)
- 9 May – See You Friday (1997)
- 18 May – Wokenwell (1997)
- 6 June – The Man Who Made Husbands Jealous (1997)
- 25 June – The Animal Shelf (1997–2000)
- 8 July – Captain Star (1997–1998)
- 14 July – ...from Hell (1997–2010)
- 28 July – Ain't Misbehavin' (1997)
- 30 August – Tricky (1997)
- 2 September – Knight School (1997–1998)
- 4 September – The Adventures of Paddington Bear (1997–2000)
- 5 September – Kipper (1997–2000)
- 8 September – Noah's Ark (1997–1998)
- 12 September – The Practice (1997–2004)
- 25 September – The Uninvited (1997)
- 26 September – Titch (1997–2001)
- 19 October – Trial & Retribution (1997–2009)
- 24 October – An Unsuitable Job for a Woman (1997–2001)
- 14 November – Bernard's Watch (1997–2005)
- 18 November – Savage Earth (1997)
- 21 November – Blind Men (1997–1998)
- 7 December – Painted Lady (1997)
- 23 December – The Pale Horse (1997)

=== Channel 4 ===
- 3 January – Captain Butler (1997)
- 13 January – Collectors' Lot (1997–2001)
- 25 January – Last Chance Lottery (1997)
- 27 January – Pet Rescue (1997–2003)
- 29 January
  - Brass Eye (1997–2001)
  - Fortean TV (1997–1998)
- 1 February – The Show (1997)
- 17 February – Under the Moon (1997–1998)
- 24 March – Light Lunch (1997–1999)
- 7 April – Armstrong and Miller (1997–2001)
- 12 May
  - Melissa (1997)
  - Soul Music (1997)
- 30 May – Harry Hill (1997–2003)
- 15 July – Space Cadets (1997)
- 1 August – King of the Hill (1997–2010)
- 3 August – Game of War (1997)
- 9 October – A Dance to the Music of Time (1997)
- 31 October – TV Offal (1997–1998)
- 4 November – Underworld (1997)

=== S4C ===
- Unknown
  - Y Clwb Rygbi (1997–present)
  - Ffermio (1997–present)

=== Channel 5 ===
- 30 March
  - Family Affairs (1997–2005)
  - The Jack Docherty Show (1997–1999)
- 31 March
  - 100% (1997–2001)
  - Whittle (1997–1998)
  - 5 News (1997–present)
  - Hot Property (1997–1998, 2001–2003)
  - Havakazoo (1997–2002)
  - Milkshake! (1997–present)
- 3 April – Bring Me the Head of Light Entertainment (1997–2000)
- 4 April – MLB on Five (1997–2008)
- 5 April – Night Fever (1997–2002)
- 12 April – Wimzie's House (1995–1996)
- May – Football on 5 (1997–2012, 2015–present)
- 12 July – Xena: Warrior Princess (1995–2001)
- 12 September – Name That Tune (1997–1998)
- 22 September – Wing and a Prayer (1997–1999)
- 5 December – Lexx (1997–2002)

=== Nickelodeon UK ===
- 13 January – Kenan & Kel (1996–2001)
- 1 September – KaBlam! (1996–2000)
- 4 November – The Angry Beavers (1997–2006)

=== Cartoon Network UK ===
- 6 January – Cow and Chicken (1997–1999)
- 30 August – Johnny Bravo (1997–2004)

=== Disney Channel UK ===
- 30 August – Nightmare Ned (1997)
- 1 September – Studio Disney UK (1997–2005)
- 18 October –
  - Recess (1997–2001)
  - Pepper Ann (1997–2000)

=== Sky 1/One ===
- 14 October – Dream Team (1997–2007)

=== Paramount Comedy Channel ===
- 5 February – Armstrong and Miller (1997–1999)

== Channels ==
=== New channels ===
Date	Channel
3 February	Trouble
30 March	Channel 5
1 September	National Geographic Channel
1 November	UK Arena
1 November	UK Horizons
1 November	UK Style
9 November	BBC News 24
22 November	Rapture TV

=== Defunct channels ===
Date	Channel
31 August	Granada Talk TV
31 August	Sky 2 (original)

=== Rebranded channels ===
Date	Old Name	New Name
3 February	The Family Channel	Challenge TV
14 February	SelecTV	Carlton Select
3 April	The Learning Channel	Discovery Home & Leisure
4 October	BBC1	BBC One
4 October	BBC2	BBC Two
27 October	UK Living	Living TV
1 November	Sky 1	Sky One
1 November	Sky Movies	Sky Movies Screen 1
1 November	The Movie Channel	Sky Movies Screen 2

== Television shows ==
=== Changes of network affiliation ===
Shows	Moved from	Moved to
Sale of the Century	ITV	Challenge
3-2-1	ITV	Challenge
Blockbusters	ITV; Sky One	BBC Two

=== Returning this year after a break of one year or longer ===
- Captain Pugwash (1957–1975 BBC, 1997–2002 ITV)
- Sale of the Century (1971–1983 ITV, 1989–1991 Sky One, 1997 Challenge)
- Birds of a Feather (1989–1994,1997–1998, 2014–2020)
- Blankety Blank (1979–1990, 1997–2002)
- Blockbusters (1983–1993 ITV, 1994–1995 Sky One, 1997 BBC Two, 2000–2001 Sky One, 2012 Challenge, 2019 Comedy Central)

== Continuing television shows ==
=== 1920s ===
- BBC Wimbledon (1927–1939, 1946–2019, 2021–present)

=== 1930s ===
- Trooping the Colour (1937–1939, 1946–2019, 2023–present)
- The Boat Race (1938–1939, 1946–2019, 2021–present)
- BBC Cricket (1939, 1946–1999, 2020–2024)

=== 1940s ===
- Come Dancing (1949–1998)

=== 1950s ===
- Panorama (1953–present)
- Take Your Pick! (1955–1968, 1992–1998)
- What the Papers Say (1956–2008)
- The Sky at Night (1957–present)
- Blue Peter (1958–present)
- Grandstand (1958–2007)

=== 1960s ===
- Coronation Street (1960–present)
- Songs of Praise (1961–present)
- World in Action (1963–1998)
- Top of the Pops (1964–2006)
- Match of the Day (1964–present)
- Mr. and Mrs. (1965–1999)
- Sportsnight (1965–1997)
- Call My Bluff (1965–2005)
- The Money Programme (1966–2010)

=== 1970s ===
- Rainbow (1972–1992, 1994–1997)
- Emmerdale (1972–present)
- Newsround (1972–present)
- Last of the Summer Wine (1973–2010)
- Wish You Were Here...? (1974–2003)
- Arena (1975–present)
- One Man and His Dog (1976–present)
- Grange Hill (1978–2008)
- Ski Sunday (1978–present)
- Antiques Roadshow (1979–present)
- Question Time (1979–present)

=== 1980s ===
- Play Your Cards Right (1980–1987, 1994–1999, 2002–2003)
- Family Fortunes (1980–2002, 2006–2015, 2020–present)
- Children in Need (1980–present)
- Timewatch (1982–present)
- Brookside (1982–2003)
- Countdown (1982–present)
- Right to Reply (1982–2001)
- Surprise Surprise (1984–2001, 2012–2015)
- The Bill (1984–2010)
- Channel 4 Racing (1984–2016)
- Thomas & Friends (1984–2021)
- EastEnders (1985–present)
- The Cook Report (1985–1999)
- Crosswits (1985–1998)
- Screen Two (1985–1998)
- Telly Addicts (1985–1998)
- Blind Date (1985–2003, 2017–2019)
- Comic Relief (1985–present)
- The Chart Show (1986–1998, 2008–2009)
- Equinox (1986–2006)
- The Really Wild Show (1986–2006)
- Casualty (1986–present)
- Chain Letters (1987–1997)
- The Time, The Place (1987–1998)
- ChuckleVision (1987–2009)
- You Bet! (1988–1997)
- Playdays (1988–1997)
- Wheel of Fortune (1988–2001)
- London's Burning (1988–2002)
- On the Record (1988–2002)
- Fifteen to One (1988–2003, 2013–2019)
- This Morning (1988–present)
- Children's Ward (1989–2000)
- Mike and Angelo (1989–2000)
- Birds of a Feather (1989–1998, 2014–2020)
- Bodger & Badger (1989–1999)

=== 1990s ===
- Drop the Dead Donkey (1990–1998)
- One Foot in the Grave (1990–2000)
- Rosie and Jim (1990–2000)
- MasterChef (1990–2001, 2005–present)
- How 2 (1990–2006)
- Stars in Their Eyes (1990–2006, 2015)
- 2point4 Children (1991–1999)
- Big Break (1991–2002)
- The Brittas Empire (1991–1997)
- Soldier Soldier (1991–1997)
- Noel's House Party (1991–1999)
- GamesMaster (1992–1998)
- Heartbeat (1992–2010)
- Men Behaving Badly (1992–1998)
- The Big Breakfast (1992–2002)
- 999 (1992–2003)
- Sooty & Co. (1993–1998)
- Mr. Motivator exercise routines (1993–2000)
- Breakfast with Frost (1993–2005)
- Ky's Cartoons (1994–1999)
- Animal Hospital (1994–2004)
- The National Lottery Draws (1994–2017)
- Time Team (1994–2013)
- The Vicar of Dibley (1994–2007)
- Wipeout (1994–2003)
- Frasier (1993–2004)
- Wycliffe (1994–1998)
- Top of the Pops 2 (1994–present)
- Oh, Doctor Beeching! (1995–1997)
- Father Ted (1995–1998)
- Hollyoaks (1995–present)
- Is It Legal? (1995–1998)

== Ending this year ==
- The Woody Woodpecker Show (1957–1997)
- Sportsnight (1965–1997)
- Rainbow (1972–1992, 1994–1997)
- Mastermind (1972–1997, 2003–present)
- Celebrity Squares (1975–1979, 1993–1997, 2014–2015)
- Give Us a Clue (1979–1997)
- Postman Pat (1981, 1991–1994, 1996, 2004–2008)
- Chain Letters (1987–1997)
- You Bet! (1988–1997, 2024–2025)
- Playdays (1988–1997)
- The Brittas Empire (1991–1997)
- Soldier Soldier (1991–1997)
- Come Outside (1993–1997)
- Talking Telephone Numbers (1994–1997)
- All Quiet on the Preston Front (1994–1997)
- Pie in the Sky (1994–1997)
- Cone Zone (1995–1997)
- Oh, Doctor Beeching! (1995–1997)
- Mr. Men and Little Miss (1995–1997)
- Jays' World (1995–1997)
- Paul Merton in Galton and Simpson's... (1996–1997)
- This Life (1996–1997)
- The Big Big Talent Show (1996–1997)
- All Rise for Julian Clary (1996–1997)
- Have Your Cake and Eat It (1997)
- Plotlands (1997)
- The Man Who Made Husbands Jealous (1997)
- Drovers' Gold (1997)
- Ain't Misbehavin' (1997)
- Holding On (1997)
- Hotel (1997)
- The Prince of Atlantis (1997)
- The History of Tom Jones (1997)

== Births ==
- 2 February – Ellie Bamber, actress
- 1 April – Asa Butterfield, actor
- 15 April – Maisie Williams, actress
- 3 July – Mia McKenna-Bruce, actress
- 16 August – Tilly Keeper, actress
- 25 August – Holly Gibbs, actress
- 7 September – Dean-Charles Chapman, actor
- 16 September – Amy-Leigh Hickman, actress

== Deaths ==
Date	Name	Age	Cinematic Credibility
11 January	Jill Summers	86	actress (Coronation Street)
20 January	Dennis Main Wilson	72	television producer
21 January	John Glyn-Jones	87	actor
22 January	Wally Whyton	67	musician and television presenter
23 January	David Waller	76	actor (Cribb, Edward & Mrs Simpson)
30 January	Nicholas Mallett	51	television producer
9 February	Barry Evans	53	actor (Doctor in the House, Mind Your Language)
24 February	Isabelle Lucas	69	actress (The Fosters)
25 February	Scott Forbes	76	actor and scriptwriter
9 March	Terry Nation	66	television scriptwriter (Doctor Who), (Blake's 7)
13 March	Ronald Fraser	66	actor (The Sweeney, Brideshead Revisited, Minder, Lovejoy)
29 March	Ellen Pollock	94	actress
6 April	Barbara Yu Ling	63	actress
3 May	Hughie Green	77	television presenter (Opportunity Knocks)
11 May	Genine Graham	70	television presenter
7 June	Paul Reade	54	theme tune composer (The Victorian Kitchen Garden, The Flumps, Crystal Tipps and Alistair, Antiques Roadshow)
19 June	Julia Smith	70	television director and producer (EastEnders)
22 June	Don Henderson	65	actor (Doctor Who, The Paradise Club, Strangers)
26 June	Charlie Chester	83	stand-up comedian and television and radio presenter
7 July	Royston Tickner	74	actor
15 July	Rosamund Greenwood	90	actress (Upstairs, Downstairs, All Creatures Great and Small, Angels, Crown Court, A Perfect Spy)
22 July	Vincent Hanna	57	television journalist
24 July	Brian Glover	63	actor (Whatever Happened to the Likely Lads?, Porridge, Dixon of Dock Green, Secret Army, Last of the Summer Wine, All Creatures Great and Small, The Bill)
24 July	Bill Shine	85	actor (Super Gran)
27 July	Isabel Dean	79	actress (I, Claudius, Inspector Morse)
13 August	Marjorie Lynette Sigley	68	actress and television producer (The Wall Game, T-Bag)
14 August	John Elliot	79	television producer
25 August	Peter Dews	67	television stage director
12 September	Leonard Maguire	73	actor (Dixon of Dock Green, Emmerdale Farm, Whatever Happened to the Likely Lads?, EastEnders, Bergerac)
17 September	Brian Hall	59	actor (Terry Hughes in Fawlty Towers)
19 September	Jack May	75	actor (Adam Adamant Lives!)
25 September	Paul Bernard	68	television director
30 September	Graeme MacDonald	67	television producer
5 October	Andrew Keir	71	actor (The Avengers, Z Cars)
5 October	Debbie Linden	36	actress (Are You Being Served?, Bergerac, The Bill)
6 October	Adrienne Hill	60	actress (Doctor Who)
20 October	Ron Tarr	60	Actor (EastEnders as Big Ron)
17 November	Wilfred Josephs	70	theme tune composer (Horizon, I, Claudius, Pride and Prejudice)
4 December	Richard Vernon	72	actor (The Hitchhiker's Guide to the Galaxy, Yes Minister, Yes, Prime Minister)
8 December	Stephen Tredre	34	actor (The Bill)

== See also ==
- 1997 in British music
- 1997 in British radio
- 1997 in the United Kingdom
- List of British films of 1997
