= Nattress =

Nattress is a surname and may refer to:

- Clive Nattress (born 1951), English footballer
- Ric Nattress (born 1962), Canadian hockey player
- K. Brett Nattress, a leader of The Church of Jesus Christ of Latter-day Saints

== See also ==
- Nattrass (disambiguation)
