= Holiday Hit Squad =

Holiday Hit Squad is a British television programme broadcast on BBC One and presented by Angela Rippon, Helen Skelton and Joe Crowley. It sorts out holiday/hotel problems
