= Wall game =

Wall game can refer to different games

- Eton wall game, famously played only at Eton
- The Wall Game, a UK children's game show on ITV during the 1980s
- Any game that redefines a wall as part of the board that the game is played on, for example Escape from Colditz
