= Match point =

Match point may refer to:

- Match point (tennis), won if the player in the lead scores
- Matchpoint scoring, in duplicate bridge
- Match Point, a 2005 film directed by Woody Allen
- Matchpoint (game show), a 1990 British game show
- Match Point (TV series), a 2026 Thai television series
