= Helen Skelton =

English TV presenter (born 1983)

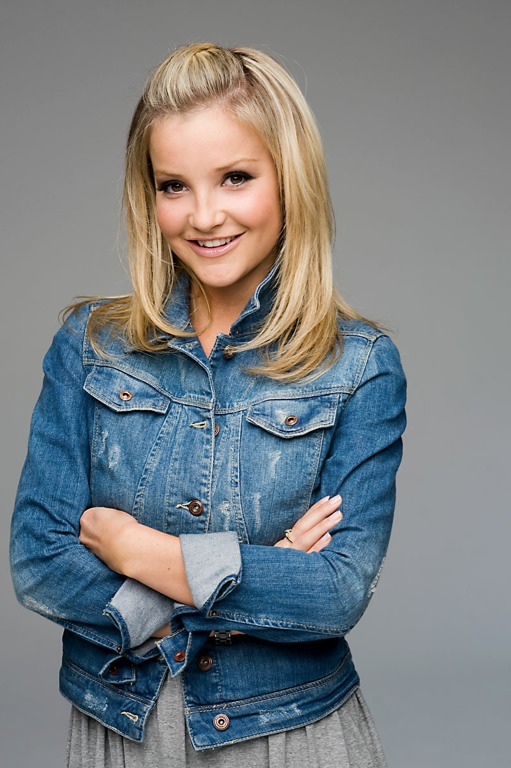
- Skelton in 2011
- Born: Helen Elizabeth Skelton; 19 July 1983 (age 43); Carlisle, Cumbria, England
- Occupation: Television presenter
- Years active: 1999–present
- Employers: BBC; ITV
- Television: Blue Peter (2008–2013); Countryfile (2008–present); Holiday Hit Squad (2013–2014); The Instant Gardener (2015–2016); Lorraine (2016–2017); Big Week At the Zoo (2019–present); Friday on the Farm (2020–present); Morning Live (2023–present)
- Spouse: Richie Myler (m. 2013; sep. 2022)
- Children: 3
- Relatives: Gavin Skelton (brother)

Helen Elizabeth Skelton (born 19 July 1983) is an English television presenter who appears regularly on BBC1's Morning Live.

She co-presented the BBC children's programme Blue Peter from 2008 until 2013, and since 2014 has been a presenter on Countryfile. She co-presented two series of the BBC One programme Holiday Hit Squad alongside Angela Rippon and Joe Crowley. She also presented the daytime series The Instant Gardener that ran for two series.

Her name is one of those featured on the sculpture Ribbons, unveiled in 2024.

== Early life ==
Skelton was born on 19 July 1983, in Carlisle, Cumbria, England, and brought up on a dairy farm in the village of Kirkby Thore. She attended its local Primary School, and then Appleby Grammar School, ultimately graduating from Cumbria Institute of the Arts, where she gained a BA degree in journalism. During her time at college, she worked as an extra on Coronation Street and Cutting It.

Skelton has said that if she were not a broadcaster, she would be a teacher. Her brother Gavin was a professional footballer and has also been a player-manager.

== Career ==
Skelton signing autographs in December 2010, at the UK National Cat Show, Bracknell Leisure Centre

=== Early career ===
After briefly working in public relations, Skelton decided to concentrate on journalism. She worked in the newsroom at CFM Radio, and was involved with various programmes at Border Television, before becoming a breakfast presenter on BBC Radio Cumbria in 2005, one of the youngest breakfast slot presenters on the BBC network at that time. She was then a reporter and occasional presenter on children's news programme Newsround and its weekend sports-based version, Sportsround.

=== Television ===
Skelton was revealed as a presenter on Blue Peter on 28 August 2008, replacing Zoe Salmon and becoming the 33rd presenter for the programme. In August 2013, she announced her departure from the show; she was replaced by Radzi Chinyanganya. Skelton worked on other projects during her time on Blue Peter, mainly correspondent-based; these included reporting from the Championships, Wimbledon.

After her departure from Blue Peter, Skelton became a presenter of live FA Women's Super League football matches for the BT Sport channel, as well as retaining her BBC reporter roles. She has occasionally presented segments of Countryfile since 2008, and also presented two series of Holiday Hit Squad in 2013/14 alongside Angela Rippon and Joe Crowley. In 2014/15, she presented the London Marathon Highlights show on the BBC. She was replaced by Ore Oduba in 2016.

In December 2012, Skelton took part in a Christmas Special edition of the BBC One programme Strictly Come Dancing. Since 2015, Skelton has co-presented daytime BBC One series The Instant Gardener alongside Danny Clarke. In early 2016, she presented Tonight: Kids V Career.

Skelton was a reporter for the BBC at the London 2012 Olympics. This led to Skelton hosting coverage of the 2016 European Swimming Championships with Mark Foster and Rebecca Adlington. She worked for the BBC at the 2016 Summer Olympics presenting swimming coverage alongside Rebecca Adlington, Adrian Moorhouse, Andy Jameson and Mark Foster. In October that year, Skelton guest presented five editions of Lorraine on ITV, plus further five in February 2017. She also co-presented two editions of Walks with My Dog on More4 in 2017; in the same year, Skelton returned to host the swimming coverage on the BBC during the 2017 World Aquatics Championships with Adlington and Foster.

Skelton appeared in Celebrity Antiques Road Trip (series 8 episode 14) with her friend and ex-co-presenter Rebecca Adlington.

From 24 September 2022, Skelton competed in the twentieth series of Strictly Come Dancing, partnered with professional dancer Gorka Marquez. On Saturday 22 October she finished joint first on the leaderboard after dancing the Charleston to the Blue Peter theme tune as a part of the celebrations of BBC's 100th Anniversary.

Skelton moved into voice-acting in 2023 when she was announced as the voice of a new character, farmer Annie Morris, in the children's animated series, Fireman Sam.

=== Writing ===
Skelton's first novel, Amy Wild: Amazon Summer, was published in May 2015. Skelton's autobiography, In My Stride, was published on 12 October 2023.

=== Radio ===
Skelton hosted a weekly slot on BBC Radio 5 Live on Sundays from 3pm to 6pm and acts as temporary co-host on BBC Radio 5 Live Drive Time with Tony Livesey. From August 2022 to August 2023, Skelton replaced Laura Whitmore in presenting BBC Radio 5 Live's morning show, every Sunday between 10am-12pm. Skelton left Radio 5 in August 2023.

== Challenges ==
=== Wheelchair dance contest challenge ===
In December 2008, Skelton entered and won the Malta Open Dance Competition with a 16-year-old wheelchair user as her partner, defeating 100 other dancers.

=== Ultra marathons ===
In April 2009, Skelton became only the second woman ever to finish the 78-mile (126 km) Namibian ultra marathon. She completed the run in 23 hours and 45 minutes – just 15 minutes under the time limit of one day. She told Newsround: 'It was a gruelling experience, but one I'll never forget. There were tough times but also amazing times.' Skelton has also completed the London Marathon on three occasions; 2009, 2014 and 2019.

=== Kayaking the Amazon ===
In early 2010, Skelton kayaked the entire length of the Amazon River for Sport Relief 2010. She kayaked 2,010 miles (3,230 km) on a solo journey from Nauta in Peru on 20 January, to Almeirim, Brazil on 28 February. She achieved two entries in the Guinness World Records: the longest solo journey by kayak, and the longest distance in a kayak in 24 hours by a woman.

Nigel Evans, the member of parliament for the Ribble Valley, tabled an Early Day Motion in the House of Commons after her Amazon challenge:

That this House congratulates Blue Peter presenter Helen Skelton on her 2,000 mile kayak along the Amazon to raise money for Sport Relief; notes her considerable position as a role model to young people and the magnificent example she sets; further notes the forthcoming verification by Guinness World Records of the two records set by Helen during her effort – longest solo journey by kayak and the longest distance travelled in a kayak in 24 hours by a woman; and further notes the work of Sport Relief in raising money to help transform the lives of poor and vulnerable people, both in the UK and all over the world.

=== Tightrope walking ===
Skelton walked a 150-metre tightrope between chimneys at Battersea Power Station, 66 metres above ground, to raise money for Comic Relief on 28 February 2011. Blue Peter created two specials about her walk.

=== South Pole ===
In 2012, Skelton raised more money for Sport Relief by becoming the first person to reach the South Pole using a bicycle. The bike was custom built for her trip, with 8-inch (200 mm) wide tyres. She also used skis and a kite to help her pull a sled containing 82 kg of supplies. Skelton covered 329 miles (529 km) by kite ski, 103 by bike and 68 by cross-country ski. She is also the first person to claim a world record for the fastest 100 km by kite ski, in seven hours 28 minutes, which was set during the trip. Guinness World Records commentated on the award, saying: 'We are aware of explorers who have achieved longer distances, but Helen Skelton's application was the first that Guinness World Records had received specifically for the 100-kilometre distance.' Blue Peter also made five six-episode specials for this event.

=== Helen's Magnificent 7 ===
In April 2013, wanting to inspire Blue Peter viewers to do something to support Comic Relief, Skelton took on seven challenges set by Comic Relief while breaking one world record. She called this series of challenges her "Magnificent 7", a reference to the 1960 Western The Magnificent Seven:

- Rugby Kick – failed
- Performing In Two Shows In One Night – succeeded
- Flying With the Red Arrows – succeeded
- Photo Shoot – succeeded
- Rope Bridge – succeeded
- Longest Line of Bunting – succeeded (at the time, a World Record)
- Coin Toss – failed

=== Sport Relief ===
In March 2018, Skelton took part in a celebrity boxing match defeating Camilla Thurlow via unanimous decision after three 2-minute rounds for the BBC's Sport Relief.

== Personal life ==
In December 2013, Skelton married England national rugby league team player Richie Myler; she gave birth to their first child, a boy, on 19 June 2015. After Myler joined the Catalans Dragons club, they moved to France in September 2015. Their second son was born in April 2017 and their third child, a daughter, was born on 28 December 2021.

Skelton announced via her Instagram account 25 April 2022, that she and Myler were no longer a couple, as he had left the family home.

== Filmography ==
Television

Year	Title	Role
1999	Coronation Street	Supporting role
1999	Cutting It	Supporting role
2005	BBC Radio Cumbria	Presenter
2007	Sportsround	Co-presenter
2007–2008	Newsround	Reporter & relief presenter
2008–2013	Blue Peter	Co-presenter
2008—	Countryfile	Co-presenter
2009–2011	Country Tracks	Co-presenter
2012	Strictly Come Dancing: Christmas Special	Contestant
2013–2014	Holiday Hit Squad	Co-presenter
2014–2015	London Marathon Highlights	Presenter
2015—	The Instant Gardener	Co-presenter
2016	2016 European Swimming Championships Coverage (BBC)	Presenter
2016, 2018–	Tonight	Reporter
2016	BBC Sport Olympic Coverage	Presenter
2016	The School that Got Teens Reading	Co-presenter
2016–2017	Lorraine	Guest presenter
2017	Walks with My Dog	Co-presenter, 2 episodes
2017	2017 World Aquatics Championships Swimming Coverage (BBC)	Presenter
2018–	Big Week at the Zoo/This Week at the Farm	Co-presenter
2019–	Digging Up Britain's Past	Co-presenter, 1 Season, 6 Episodes
2020	Celebrity SAS: Who Dares Wins	Contestant
2020	Luxury Christmas for Less	Co-presenter
2020	This Week on the Farm	Co-presenter
2021	Steph's Packed Lunch	Guest presenter
2021–present	Live: Summer on the Farm	Co-Presenter
2022	Inside the Superbrands	Presenter
2022	Betfred Super League Rugby	Presenter
2022	Strictly Come Dancing	Series 20 - Runner-up
2023–present	Morning Live	Co-presenter
2023	Dan & Helen's Pennine Adventure	Co-presenter; alongside Dan Walker
2023–	Fireman Sam	Annie Morris (voice role)
2023–present	Yorkshire Great & Small with Dan & Helen	Co-presenter; alongside Dan Walker
2025–present	Lost and Found in the Lakes	Presenter
2025	Forever Home	Presenter
2025	Coastal Adventures with Helen, Jules & JB	Co-presenter

=== Guest appearances ===
- What's Cooking? (2013) – Guest
- Countdown (2013) – 'Dictionary Corner' guest
- The Chase: Celebrity Special (2013) – Contestant
- All Star Family Fortunes (2015) – Contestant
- Blue Peter (2015) – Guest
- The TV That Made Me (2015) – Subject
- Pointless Celebrities – Contestant
- Sunday Brunch (2013, 2014, 2015, 2016, 2019) – Guest
- The One Show (2023, 2025) – Guest

== See also ==
- List of Blue Peter presenters
- List of Strictly Come Dancing contestants
