= Nattrass =

Nattrass may refer to:

== Surname ==
- Floyd Nattrass (1918–2004), Canadian sports shooter
- Harry Nattrass (1898–unknown), English football referee
- Irving Nattrass (born 1952), English former footballer
- Mike Nattrass (born 1945), British politician
- Nicoli Nattrass, University of Cape Town economist
- Peter Nattrass (born 1941), Australian gynaecologist, businessman and politician
- Ralph Nattrass (1925–2014), Canadian ice hockey player
- Susan Nattrass (born 1950), Canadian trap shooter and medical researcher

== Other ==
- Tesco Supermarkets Ltd v Nattrass, a 1971 House of Lords decision

== See also ==
- Nattress (disambiguation)
