= Police 5 =

British TV factual crime series (1962–1992, 2014)

- Genre: Factual
- Presented by: Shaw Taylor; Joe Crowley (2014); Kate McIntyre (2014)
- Country of origin: United Kingdom
- Original language: English

Production
- Production location: Multiple location(s)
- Running time: 5 minutes (1962–1992); 30 minutes (2014)

Original release
- Network: ITV
- Release: 30 June 1962 – 18 December 1992
- Network: Channel 5
- Release: 18 February – 25 March 2014

Related
- Junior Police 5 (1972–1979)

Police 5 is a British television programme that reconstructs major unsolved crimes in order to gain information from the public which may assist in solving the case. It originally aired in some ITV regions from 1962 to 1992, followed by a brief revival in 2014 on Channel 5.

== Creation ==
Police 5 was commissioned when Lew Grade needed a five-minute programme to fill a gap in the schedules for six weeks caused by an American import underrunning. The idea came from Steve Wade, Head of Outside Broadcasts, and Grade refused to copyright the format, which allowed other ITV regions to launch their own versions with Shaw Taylor often hosting them. Almost a third of the appeals featured in the programme led to an arrest.

The format was later sold overseas; in Germany it was a networked hour-long programme, Aktenzeichen XY… ungelöst (German for "Case number XY ... Unsolved") on ZDF since 1967, which became the blueprint for the BBC's Crimewatch (1984); Taylor had pitched the idea for a centralised version to Channel 4 in 1982 but the idea had been rejected. Taylor was later involved in the creation of televised appeals for Crimestoppers UK, which were aired in many ITV regions.

In 2008, Taylor played a fictionalised version of himself hosting a version of the programme in an episode of Ashes to Ashes.

== History ==
The five-minute programme was originally produced by ATV for its London and Midlands region from 1962 and shortly afterwards the format was picked up by a number of other ITV network regions, some versions of which used the same name and presenter. These included LWT, Television South (TVS) and Central Independent Television. The HTV West version began in 1975 and was hosted by newsreader Bruce Hockin. The show's original thirty-year run ended on 18 December 1992 in the South and South East of England region due to the production company TVS losing its broadcasting franchise. Following negotiations with the next franchise holder, Meridian Broadcasting, it was decided not to continue Police 5.

Taylor later presented a spin-off show for younger viewers called Junior Police 5 which was aired between 1972 and 1979. His catchphrase was "keep 'em peeled!" – asking viewers to be vigilant. In 2014, Channel 5 revived Police 5 for a seven-part series with new presenters Joe Crowley and Kate McIntyre. At the age of 89, Taylor appeared on each half-hour programme for a short segment in which he “set out to reunite theft victims with what’s rightfully theirs”.

== Other versions ==
Similar formats were aired in different ITV regions. Police Call was seen in the Anglia and Tyne Tees areas while Police File was the title adopted for programmes on Granada and Channel. For Scottish Television, Crimedesk was presented by the crime author Bill Knox. Police Action, originally known as Crime Desk, was only shown in the Southern Television area and was presented by local reporter Peter Clark. Police 6 was broadcast on Ulster Television in Northern Ireland. This version ran for 25 years until Christmas 1994, and was later replaced by Crime Call which was axed in 2001. The concept was also sold to New Zealand where it was aired from 1976 to 1986 and hosted throughout by Keith Bracey.
