= Shaw Taylor =

British TV presenter (1924–2015)

- Born: Eric Stanley Taylor; 26 October 1924; Hackney, London, England
- Died: 17 March 2015 (aged 90); Totland, Isle of Wight, England
- Occupations: Actor, television presenter
- Years active: 1950s–2015
- Partner: Shirley
- Children: Richard

Eric Stanley Taylor MBE (26 October 1924 – 17 March 2015), known professionally as Shaw Taylor, was a British actor and television presenter, best known for presenting the long-running five-minute crime programme Police 5.

== Early life and career ==
Born in Hackney in the East End of London, Taylor's father worked as a fitter for the Gas Light and Coke Company, and his mother worked at a local box factory. Taylor served in the RAF and trained at RADA. He then acted on stage in the West End and on tour. He was an announcer for Associated TeleVision (ATV) when the normal announcer was not available. He then had a variety of acting roles in film and television from the 1950s onwards, and presented various game shows including Password, Tell the Truth, Dotto, This Is Your Chance and The Law Game (BBC Radio 2). In the early 1960s, Taylor and Muriel Young co-hosted a music programme on Radio Luxembourg, The Friday Spectacular.

Between 1960 and 1962, Taylor presented the quiz show Pencil and Paper. In 1970, Taylor was the original presenter of the Clunk Click public information films. In 1972, he presented a pilot episode of Whodunnit? on ITV, before the show was taken over by Edward Woodward for the first series (1973). Taylor was also an occasional panellist on the popular talent show New Faces.

Taylor was best known for presenting Police 5, a long-running five-minute television programme first broadcast in the London area in 1962 that appealed to the public to help solve crimes.

He later presented a spin-off show for younger viewers, Junior Police 5, a.k.a. JP5. His catchphrase was "keep 'em peeled!" – asking viewers to be vigilant. This was originally used at the end of every JP5 programme but, according to Taylor himself, "...at the suggestion of a friend I tried it out on the adult Police 5. I thought it sounded a bit naff at first but then the studio crew seemed to get withdrawal symptoms if I didn't say it at the end of the programme and it became a catchphrase that complete strangers still shout at me in the street".

Taylor presented and produced several regional versions of Police 5, including editions for ATV and Central in the Midlands, LWT for the London area and TVS in the South and South East of England, where the series ended its thirty-year run in December 1992. He was also involved with televised appeals for Crimestoppers UK. In 2008, at the age of 83, Taylor featured as himself hosting Police 5 in the seventh episode of the BBC TV drama Ashes to Ashes, set in October 1981, in which he uses the aforedescribed "keep 'em peeled!" catchphrase.

In 2014, at the age of 89, he returned to television with a weekly segment on the new Channel 5 version of Police 5, and revived his "keep 'em peeled!" catchphrase. He also played bridge and presented a television series on the subject.

== Death ==
Taylor died at his home in Totland on the Isle of Wight on 17 March 2015, aged 90. He was survived by his partner Shirley and his son Richard.
