= Associated Television =

Former ITV service for London and the Midlands

ATV Network

- The ATV region before its renaming as Central Independent Television in 1982.
- Type: Region of television network
- Branding: ATV
- Country: United Kingdom
- First air date: 24 September 1955; 71 years ago, in London; 17 February 1956; 70 years ago in the Midlands; All week in the Midlands from 29 July 1968
- TV transmitters: Sutton Coldfield; Waltham; Ridge Hill; The Wrekin; Croydon; Lichfield; Membury
- Headquarters: Alpha Tower, Birmingham; London; Elstree
- Broadcast area: London (weekends, 1955 to 1968); Midlands (weekdays, 1956 to 1968; all week, 1968 to 1982)
- Owner: Associated Communications Corporation; ITC Entertainment
- Dissolved: 29 July 1968; 58 years ago (after 12 years, 309 days, London); 1 January 1982; 44 years ago at 12.34 a.m. (after 25 years, 318 days, Midlands)
- Former names: ABC (Associated Broadcasting Company) before 8 October 1955; Associated Television (1955–1966)
- Picture format: 625- and 405-line
- Affiliation: ITV
- Language: English
- Replaced: ABC Weekend TV in the Midlands on weekends from 1968
- Replaced by: Central Independent Television in the Midlands from 1982; London Weekend Television in London from 1968
- Subsidiary: ATV Music Publishing

ATV Network Limited, originally Associated TeleVision (ATV), was a British broadcaster, part of the ITV (Independent Television) network. It provided a service to London at weekends from 1955 to 1968, to the Midlands on weekdays from 1956 to 1968, and subsequently to the Midlands all week from 1968 to 1982. It was one of the "Big Four" until 1968, and the "Big Five" after 1968, that between them produced the majority of ITV networked programmes. In 1982, ATV was restructured and rebranded as Central Independent Television, under which name it continued to provide the service for the Midlands.

ATV was awarded its first franchise by the Independent Television Authority (ITA) to provide the Independent Television service at weekends for the London region. This service started on Saturday, 24 September 1955, the second ITA franchise to go on air, and was extended until Sunday, 28 July 1968. ATV was also awarded the franchise to provide the weekdays Independent Television service for the Midlands region. This service started on Friday, 17 February 1956, the third ITA franchisee to go on air, and was extended until Monday, 29 July 1968.

Subsequent to the changes made by the ITA to the regional structure of the ITV network, ATV lost its London franchise, but was awarded the franchise to provide a seven-day service for the Midlands region which started on Tuesday, 30 July 1968 and was finally extended until 00:34 on Friday, 1 January 1982.

== History ==
=== Formation ===
The company was formed from the merger of the Associated Broadcasting Development Company (ABDC) under the control of Norman Collins, and the Incorporated Television Programme Company (ITC) under the control of Prince Littler and Lew Grade, two showbusiness agents.

Both companies had applied for a contract to become one of the new ITV stations. ABDC won the contract but had insufficient money to operate it; ITC failed to win a contract, mainly due to a perceived conflicts of interest resulting from the business operations of Grade and Littler. By the time of the merger ABDC were well advanced with their plans whilst ITC planned to operate as an independent producer selling their shows to the new network contractors.

When financial problems hit ABDC, the Independent Television Authority, the governing body of ITV, invited Grade and Littler to join the ABDC consortium. This provided the money required and put Littler and Grade in control of the new company, sidelining Collins.

The new company was originally named the Associated Broadcasting Company (ABC), but the Associated British Picture Corporation (ABPC), which wished to call their station "ABC" and ran a large chain of cinemas under those initials, successfully sued for prior ownership of the name. After the Associated Broadcasting Company had been operating for three weeks the name was changed to Associated TeleVision Ltd (ATV). The logo, designed for "ABC" and tweaked for "ATV", was a "shadowed eye" inspired by the CBS logo and reputedly designed by Lew Grade on a transatlantic flight back from the US. The logo was one of the most recognisable in British broadcasting.

=== Broadcasting ===
The two ATV regions before the franchise changes in 1968 ATV London (weekend) ATV Midlands (weekdays)

The Associated Broadcasting Company began broadcasting in its own right on Saturday 24 September 1955, after jointly presenting the network's opening night on Thursday 22 September. The name ATV was first seen in London on Saturday 8 October 1955. The company won two contracts, the weekend contract for London and the Monday–Friday contract for the Midlands. The latter service opened on 17 February 1956, with ABPC's ABC Weekend TV providing the weekend programmes.

The company ran into financial difficulty due to the staggering losses of the first two years of ITV and start-up costs. The London weekday contractor Associated-Rediffusion shouldered some of ATV's losses and further funding was achieved by selling shares to the Daily Mirror newspaper. The company structure was changed several times until 1966, when ATV and ITC both became subsidiaries of the Associated Communications Corporation (ACC), formed by turning the old structure on its head. This marked the point where Lew Grade advanced from being the greatest influence over the company to taking control.

ATV's main impact was in variety and light entertainment.

In the contract and region changes in 1968, ATV lost the weekend franchise in London to the London Television Consortium, later renamed London Weekend Television, but its Midlands contract was renewed and extended for the full seven days. At this point the company was renamed ATV Network Limited.

=== End of franchise ===
ATV was among the "Big Four" and later "Big Five" franchises that provided much of the ITV schedule. During the 1970s, ATV received much criticism over its lack of local programming, particularly for the east of its region; such critics held that local shows had a Birmingham focus. In 1980, the Independent Broadcasting Authority (IBA) decided that ATV's lack of regional programming and production (it had a major studio centre at Elstree in Hertfordshire, a legacy of its London contract, well outside its Midlands franchise) was hampering the region, so it insisted that the new applicant for the franchise be more clearly based in the region and have separate facilities for the East and West Midlands.

ATV Midlands Limited, a shell company created by ACC solely for the franchise process, applied successfully for the contract. As a condition of its award, ACC was forced to sell 49% of the company, relinquish executive roles, sell the Elstree studios and rename the company to demonstrate that it was effectively a new business.

ATV ceased broadcasting at 12.34am on the morning of Friday 1 January 1982 (the night of Thursday 31 December 1981), following Scottish Television's networked Hogmanay Show. The final closedown was marked by a brief tribute to ATV from original announcer Shaw Taylor before duty announcer Mike Prince signed off with the playing of the National Anthem (an organ recording made at St. Chad's Cathedral, Birmingham). The newly reformed company, Central Independent Television plc, began broadcasting with an extended promo at 9.25am that morning.

Central inherited the studios at ATV Centre, Birmingham and ATV Elstree along with land that ATV Midlands had purchased for their new Nottingham studio centre. Central also maintained control of ATV's news archive and regional programmes, along with programming already in production or being shown at the time of changeover and schools programming; the rest of the ATV archive was sold by ACC.

ACC later divested itself of the remainder of Central after the Australian investor Robert Holmes à Court staged a boardroom coup and forced Grade to cede control. ACC remained in control of ITC and Stoll-Moss Theatres until 1988 when The Bell Group, the owners of ITC were taken over by the Bond Corporation. Subsequently, the new owners started an asset-stripping programme at ITC. In November 1988, ITC Entertainment was bought by its management.

In January 1995, PolyGram Filmed Entertainment bought ITC for $156 million, with Grade returning as chairman for life, bringing him back into control of ITC until his death in 1998. Carlton Communications spent much of the 1980s and 1990s buying up the intellectual property of the former ACC, including the rights to the ATV logo and company name, the ATV news archive (via its purchase of Central) and finally in early January 1999, the company bought ITC's television and film library from PolyGram/Seagram for £91 million, which reunited the programme library of ATV and Central Television and doubled the stock of its library division Carlton International, by giving it a total of 15,000 hours of programming.

Granada plc merged with Carlton in 2004, and all of ATV's national archive programming has been taken into their ownership. The regional news archive from both ATV and Central, plus some regional programmes, are stored at the Media Archive for Central England at the University of Lincoln.

== Studios ==
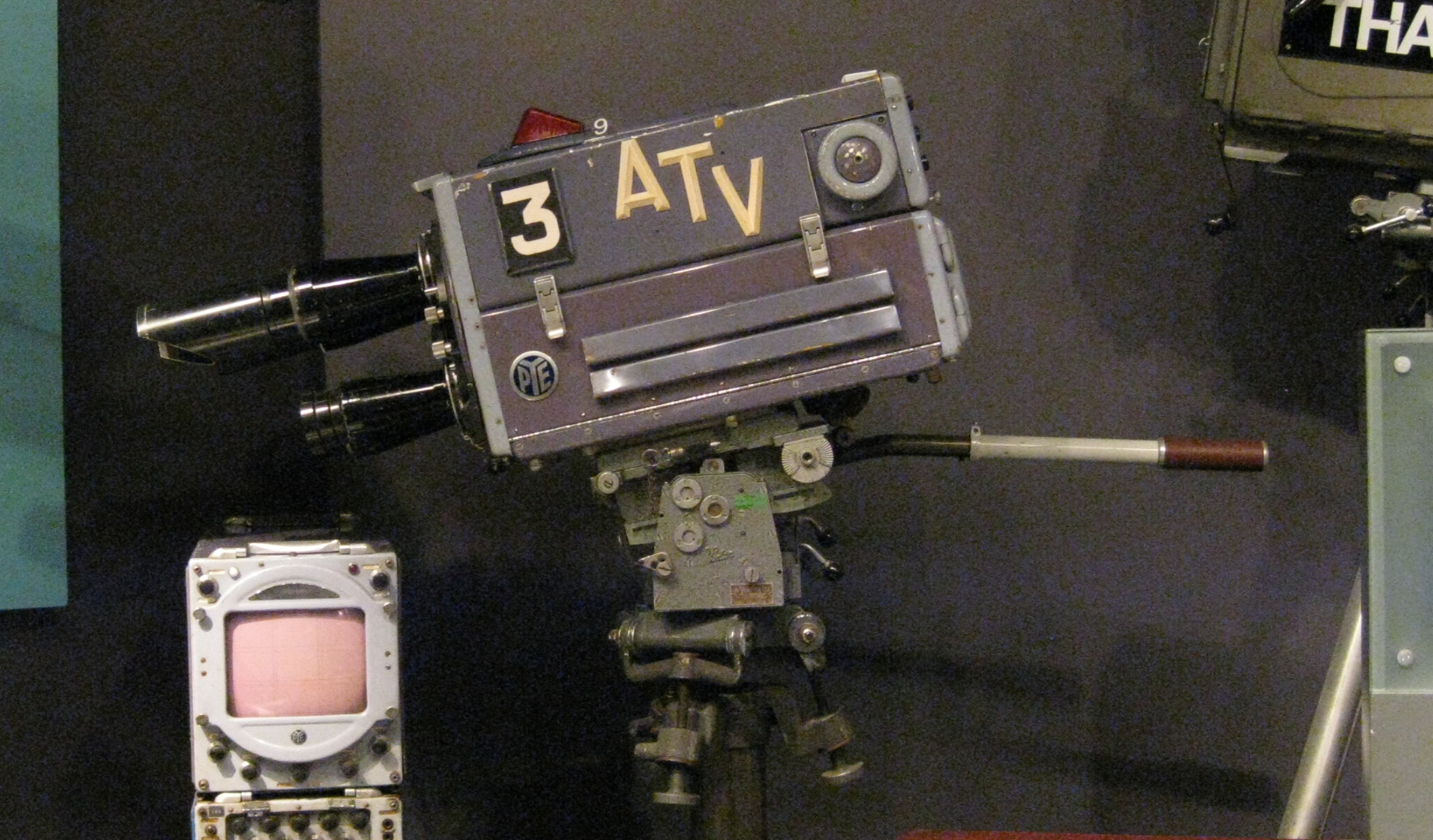
ATV camera at the National Media Museum, Bradford

For most of its time on air, ATV's main production centre was based at Elstree, Borehamwood, Hertfordshire, near London, where the majority of ATV's earlier programming was produced and distributed. The Elstree studios had been film studios since 1914, and when ATV acquired them in May 1958, the intention was to use them for ITC TV shows shot on film. One of the first productions to be filmed was The Adventures of William Tell. ATV London used a number of other converted locations for live and video-taped shows during its first decade on air, such as the Wood Green Empire, the Hackney Empire, the former Highbury Film Studios, and briefly, the New Cross Empire, but it soon became clear these were inadequate and it was decided to convert the Elstree studios from film to electronic production. The first of four studios there opened in November 1960.

Playout and presentation for ATV London was based at a separate master control facility at Foley Street in Central London, which included two studios for continuity and smaller-scale programming, such as Police 5. Shortly after ATV ceased transmission in London, the Foley Street centre was also used to transmit a management-run national ITV service during the ITV technicians' strike of August 1968.

ATV's Midlands studios were originally based in Aston, Birmingham, jointly owned by ATV and ABC under the banner Alpha Television. They supplied both ATV and ABC, and supplemented production from Elstree. In readiness for colour television, a large 'state of the art' television studio was built by ATV, the ATV Centre off Broad Street near the centre of Birmingham. This replaced the Aston studios, which were sold. The ATV Centre was in use until 1997 although two of the production studios had been 'mothballed' in the early 1990s as demand for production studios fell. As of June 2014, the complex has been partially demolished to be replaced by the upcoming Arena Central development, with the main studio building off Bridge Street standing derelict, pending the commencement of further demolition work. The Alpha Tower remains as a listed building.

A documentary about the ATV Centre was released in 2011 by MACE (Media Archive for Central England). Entitled From ATVLand In Colour (referring to the nickname used on ATV's children's programme, Tiswas, and the building being purpose-built for colour broadcasting), the documentary features presenters, actors, announcers and behind-the-scenes staff talking about their time working there, and the programmes that were made there. Contributors include Chris Tarrant, Shaw Taylor, Jane Rossington and Bob Carolgees.

In the 1981 franchise review, the IBA ordered that for ATV Midlands to keep the franchise the Elstree centre must be sold and a studio centre built in the east of the region. ATV Midlands, renamed Central Independent Television, needed an immediate start for separate East and West Midlands facilities. The new east site was at Lenton Lane, Nottingham, and the land had been bought while ATV was still in control. Planning issues delayed construction so Central purchased an independent production studio in the city (at Giltbrook) as its East Midlands newsroom. Industrial action prevented this centre from being used, with the new studios ready by the time it was resolved.

In 1983 the Elstree centre was sold to the BBC for around £7 million, and is now home of the soap EastEnders.

East Midlands Television Centre in Nottingham began operation in September 1983 but was officially opened by H.R.H. Duke of Edinburgh, Prince Philip, in March 1984. The studio was eventually sold in 2004 to the University of Nottingham as an independent facility and as the home of the Media Archive for Central England, where most of ATV's and Central's programmes are archived.

== Identity ==
ATV's logo has always consisted of a shadowed eye, inspired supposedly by the logo of CBS. This shadowed eye with the letters ATV inside came to represent the company. The first ident featured a single eye shape, moving to reveal the shadowed eye, and animating so that each of the letters ATV animate in accompanied by one of the three musical notes on the ident score. The caption below read Associated TeleVision Ltd., the only time the station's full name was displayed in an ident. The shadowed eye however was out of proportion, attributed to the hurry to redraw the ident following the name change from ABC.

Shortly after the launch of the Midlands franchise, the ident was again changed to an ident consisting of five stripes. Three of four vertical stripes contain the letters ATV, which animate in to the same musical score, with the other vertical stripe housing the logo and the stations airing times, either displaying both or those of the region being viewed in. the final stripe is horizontal, with the caption 'Presents' inside.

The next ident, launched in 1959, featured the shadowed eye zooming into the screen, whilst the familiar letters animate in as in the previous versions. This was altered in 1964 to add either the region name below it, or the word 'Presents' if the programme was an outside broadcast.

The company's most recognisable ident, however, is the one launched in 1969. Called Zoom 2, it was the ident that heralded colour broadcasts to the region for the first time. Starting with three lightspots of red, blue and green that grow individually and combine to form six colours above the caption 'In Colour', the three lightspots fully merge forming a single cream dot which then animates out into the ATV shadowed eye, fully formed, in yellow, while the background dissolves from light grey to dark blue. The score for the ident featured four trumpets, four trombones, timpani and vibraphone in a twelve beat fanfare for the station, by ATV's musical director Jack Parnell and arranged by Angela Morley. This ident was used from the introduction of colour in 1969 right until the ATV name ceased to be used in 1982. In addition to this, a variation was produced which only featured a white dot on a black background, growing and transforming into the white shadowed eye for programmes still being shown in black and white.

=== Names used ===
Company names:

- Associated Broadcasting Company Limited (1954–1955)
- Associated TeleVision Limited (1955–1964)
- Associated TeleVision Corporation (1964–1966)
- Associated Communications Corporation (1966–1982)—parent company
- ATV Network Limited (1966–1982)
- ATV Midlands Limited (1981) - This is the company that was renamed Central Independent Television from 1 January 1982, and was the licence holder for the Channel 3 Midlands region service until November 2008, when the licence was transferred to ITV Broadcasting Limited.

On-air names:

- Associated Broadcasting Company (24 September 1955 – 2 October 1955)
- Associated TeleVision (8 October 1955 – 11 February 1956)
- ATV London (18 February 1956 – 28 July 1968)
- ATV Midlands (17 February 1956 – 28 July 1968 but referred to in continuity until 1981)
- ATV Network (29 July 1968 – 1 January 1982) (always branded on-air as simply 'ATV')

Initials used:

- ABC (24 September 1955 – 2 October 1955)
- ATV (8 October 1955 – 1 January 1982)

=== Revival of brand ===
In 2015, ITV Broadcasting Ltd surrendered its rights to the ATV trademark and it was acquired by Associated Television Productions Ltd which has produced programming for the Made Television network of local television channels.

The company, ATV Network Limited, was re-established in 2006 headed by former ATV cameraman, director and Head of Children's Drama Alan Coleman. It aims to promote and celebrate the legacy of Lew Grade's ATV, with a new logo, based on the 'litespots' of the 1970s.

== Selected programmes ==
- The Adventures of Robin Hood
- Astronauts - series 2 (1983) made by Central
- ATV Today
- Bullseye The 1st series (1981) - subsequently made by Central until 1995 and revived by Granada for Challenge in 2006
- Carry On Laughing
- Celebrity Squares - revived by Reg Grundy Productions and Central between 1993 and 1997, and again by Fremantle in 2014
- The Cliff Richard Show
- Crossroads - subsequently made by Central until ending in 1988 and revived by Carlton in 2001
- Death of a Princess
- Disraeli Portrait of a Romantic
- Edward the Seventh
- Emergency Ward 10
- Family Fortunes (1980–1981) - subsequently made by Central and Carlton until ending in 2002 and revived by Fremantle in 2006
- Fire Crackers (1964–1965)
- General Hospital
- The Golden Shot
- Hine (1971)
- It Must Be Dusty
- James Paul McCartney
- Julie on Sesame Street
- The Larkins
- Link - fortnightly disability magazine programme
- Lunchbox with Noele Gordon
- Market in Honey Lane
- The Marty Feldman Comedy Machine
- Meet Peters and Lee
- Mill of Secrets
- The Muppet Show
- New Faces - subsequently made by Central
- Pipkins
- Police 5
- Sapphire & Steel
- Saturday Variety
- Star Soccer
- The Strange World of Gurney Slade
- Sunday Night at the London Palladium
- Timeslip
- Tiswas - subsequently made by Central until ending in mid-1982
- Toyah 1980 documentary
- Turtle's Progress
- Two of a Kind (1961)

The majority of ITC programmes were first broadcast by ATV and distributed in the UK by them. Similarly, ATV's productions were distributed by ITC outside of the UK, with most ATV idents replaced with those for ITC.

== Other ventures ==
=== ATV Music ===
As a side note to ATV's television activities, the company also set up a music publishing division. This was known as ATV Music and existed initially to publish TV-related music, such as theme tunes, composed by its in-house composers. It was formed after ATV acquired a substantial share of Pye Records. This company was eventually split away from the parent company and went through numerous different owners as well as buying into other established music publishers including Northern Songs, which was the Beatles' publishing company. ATV Music eventually settled into the hands of Michael Jackson before being merged into Sony/ATV Music Publishing.

== See also ==
- Central Independent Television – ATV's successor in the Midlands
- London Weekend Television – ATV London's successor
- ABC Weekend TV – ATV's predecessor at weekends in the Midlands
- ITV (TV network)
- History of ITV
- Timeline of ATV

ITV regional services
New service ATV London	London (weekends); 24 September 1955 – 28 July 1968	Succeeded by London Weekend Television
New service ATV Midlands	Midlands (weekdays); 17 February 1956 – 1 January 1982	Succeeded by Central Independent Television
Preceded by ABC Weekend TV	Midlands (weekends); 29 July 1968 – 1 January 1982	Succeeded by Central Independent Television
