= The Wall (British game show) =

BBC game show

- Genre: Game show
- Based on: The Wall by: Andrew Glassman; LeBron James
- Directed by: Richard van't Riet
- Presented by: Danny Dyer
- Voices of: Angela Rippon
- Theme music composer: Michael Lord
- Opening theme: "Behind the Wall"
- Ending theme: "Wall of Will" and "Trophies"
- Country of origin: United Kingdom
- Original language: English
- No. of series: 4
- No. of episodes: 37 (inc. 9 specials)

Production
- Executive producer: Richard Hague
- Producer: Stephen Lovelock
- Production locations: Transcolor Studio, Szeligi near Warsaw (2019); Wembley Arena (2020); Fly by Nite Studios, Redditch (2021)
- Running time: 45 minutes
- Production companies: Remarkable Entertainment; SpringHill Entertainment; Glassman Media

Original release
- Network: BBC One
- Release: 12 October 2019 – 2 April 2022

The Wall is a British television series hosted by Danny Dyer, broadcast on Saturday evenings on BBC One. It is based on the American version of the same name. The first series of the show was filmed on the set of the Polish version, at Transcolor Studio in Szeligi near Warsaw between 1 and 6 July 2019, and the second was filmed at Wembley Arena due to travel restrictions as a result of the COVID-19 pandemic in the United Kingdom. The questions are voiced by Angela Rippon. The show was developed into a board game in December 2020 by Ideal Games.

== Gameplay ==
The Wall is a four storey tall pegboard, similar to a pachinko game or bean machine; it also is similar to the Plinko board used for that pricing game of the same name on The Price is Right. The bottom of the board is divided into 15 slots marked with various pound sterling amounts, some of which increase as the game progresses. Seven numbered "drop zones" are centred at the top of the board (above the centre seven slots), from which balls can be dropped into play.

A team of two contestants plays each game, with a theoretical top prize of £687,495 (series 1–3) or £977,495 (series 4). Green balls dropped on the board will add to the team's bank, while red balls dropped on the board will subtract from it. Throughout the game, the bank has a floor of £0.

=== Round 1: Free Fall ===
In Free Fall, the team is asked a series of five questions, each with two answer choices. As each question is asked, three balls are simultaneously released from drop zones 1, 4, and 7. The team must select one answer and lock it in before the first ball crosses the threshold of a money slot. If the team's answer is correct, the balls turn green and their values are added to the team's bank. If the team answers incorrectly or fails to lock in an answer, the balls turn red and their values are subtracted from the team's bank.

If the team's bank balance is zero at the end of this round, the game ends immediately and they leave with no winnings (such occurrences are excluded from broadcast). Otherwise, their earnings become part of a guaranteed payout to be offered to them at the end of the game.

In series 4, the team could choose to double the total value of any one question by pressing a gold "Doubler" disk while the balls are falling. The maximum possible amount that a team can bank in this round is £37,500 in the first three series; this was later increased to £45,000 for the fourth series.

The values on the board range from £1 to £2,500, and are arranged as follows:

£1	£500	£100	£2,000	£10	£1,000	£1	£2,500	£1	£1,000	£10	£2,000	£100	£500	£1

=== Round 2 ===
At the start of the second round, the contestants are separated from each other for the remainder of the game. One enters an isolation chamber behind The Wall, while the other remains onstage. Two green balls are played simultaneously, dropped from zones chosen by the onstage player. Three multiple-choice questions are then played, each with three answer choices. The onstage player is shown only the answers to each question and must decide which zone to use, based on how confident he/she is that the isolated player can answer correctly. The question and answers are then presented to the isolated player; after he/she responds, the ball is dropped from the chosen zone. A correct answer turns the ball green and adds the value of the slot it lands into the team bank, while a miss turns the ball red and deducts the value. The isolated player is not told which of his/her answers are correct or given any information on the team bank.

The onstage player is offered an opportunity to "Double Up" on the second question and "Triple Up" on the third; these options allow them to play two or three balls from the selected drop zone instead of one, respectively.

After the third question, if the banked total is at least £3 (as the least that could be lost from two red balls is £2), two red balls are dropped simultaneously from the same zones that were chosen for the initial two green balls. The maximum possible amount that a team can bank in this round is £199,998. In the first three series, two initial green balls were played from different zones chosen by the onstage player, and a team could bank up to £199,998. Beginning with the fourth series, seven initial green balls are played in a "SuperDrop," one from every zone, and a team could bank up to £474,998. The values on the board range from £1 to £25,000, and are arranged as follows:

£1	£500	£100	£1,000	£10	£2,500	£1	£5,000	£1	£10,000	£10	£15,000	£100	£25,000	£1

=== Round 3 ===
The gameplay proceeds as in Round 2, but each of the three questions now has four answer choices. In addition, three green and three red balls are played at the start and end of the round respectively, and are dropped one at a time, rather than simultaneously. The "Double Up" and "Triple Up" options are available as before.

The maximum possible amount that a team can bank in this round is £449,997.

The values on the board range from £1 to £50,000, and are arranged as follows:

£1	£2,500	£100	£5,000	£10	£10,000	£1	£15,000	£1	£20,000	£10	£25,000	£100	£50,000	£1

=== Final Decision ===
After the third question in Round 3, the isolated player is sent a contract by the host and must either sign or destroy it. After the three red balls have dropped in Round 3 and the final bank is calculated (or after the last question if there is less than £3 banked), the isolated player returns to the stage to reveal his/her decision. Only at this point does he/she learn the number of correct answers given, the payout total, and the team's final bank. If the isolated player signs the contract, the team gives up the team bank in favour of a guaranteed payout, equal to the Free Fall winnings plus an additional £2,500 for every question answered correctly in Rounds 2 and 3. If the isolated player destroys the contract, the team receives their final bank total instead.

The maximum possible guaranteed payout is £52,500 (series 1–3) or £60,000 (series 4), obtained by scoring £37,500 (£45,000 during series 4), in Free Fall and answering all six questions correctly in Rounds 2 and 3. The maximum possible bank total is £687,495 (£977,495 from series 4 onwards), obtained by answering every question correctly, having every green ball drop into the highest-valued slot, and having the five mandatory red balls each drop into a £1 slot.

== Transmissions ==
=== Series ===
Series	Episodes	Originally released		References
Series	Episodes	First released	Last released	References
1	6	12 October 2019	16 November 2019	
2	8	3 October 2020	17 July 2021	
3	8	27 February 2021	5 June 2021	
4	6	12 February 2022	2 April 2022	

Series two and three were shown out of order. The first six episodes of series two were broadcast in 2020, followed by the whole of series three in 2021. Episodes seven and eight of series two were broadcast in July 2021.

=== Versus Celebrities ===
The celebrity editions of The Wall are titled as The Wall Versus Celebrities.

No.	Contestants	Series (Note: Some specials appear in BBC’s episode guide as a part of a particular series, even though they are not subject to a standard episode count.)	Original release date	Ref.
1	Stacey Dooley and Craig Revel Horwood	2	24 December 2020	
2	Sally Lindsay and Alex Brooker	2	31 December 2020	
3	John Barnes and Chris Kamara	3	20 February 2021	
4	James Bye and Maddy Hill	4	23 December 2021	
5	Sarah Millican and Gary Delaney	4	15 January 2022	
6	Ronan Keating and Storm Keating	4	22 January 2022	
7	Shaparak Khorsandi and Ellie Taylor	4	5 March 2022	
8	Katie Piper and Nicolas Hamilton	4	9 April 2022	
9	Martin and Shirlie Kemp	4	16 April 2022	
