= Amazing Greys =

- Genre: Game show
- Presented by: Paddy McGuinness; Angela Rippon
- Announcer: David Goldstrom
- Country of origin: United Kingdom
- Original language: English
- No. of series: 1
- No. of episodes: 6

Production
- Running time: 60 minutes (inc. adverts)
- Production companies: ITV Studios and Eyeworks

Original release
- Network: ITV
- Release: 12 April – 17 May 2014

Amazing Greys is a British game show that aired on ITV, co-hosted by Paddy McGuinness and Angela Rippon. It was aired from 12 April to 17 May 2014 and ran for six episodes.

== Production ==
A pilot episode was recorded at Fountain Studios in Wembley on 19 September 2013 and presented solely by McGuinness. However, when the first series began filming, Rippon joined as his co-host. It was pre-recorded at The London Studios between 25 February and 20 March 2014.

== Overview ==
The show proposes to pair a duo, an 'older star with a younger partner'. The challenger can win £10,000, but in order to win this, the challenger must defeat the 'greys' on two games out of the three played.

== Greys ==
| Grey | Age | Occupation |
|---|---|---|
| Elizabeth Horrocks | | Mastermind champion |
| Roy Norton | | Table tennis player |
| Christine Truman | | Tennis player |
| Geoff Hurst | | Footballer |
| Prue Leith | | Chef |
| David Hamilton | | Radio DJ |
| Pat Tombs | | Powerlifter |
| Mary Peters | | Athlete |
| John Lowe | | Darts player |
| Ralph Johnson | | Fencer |
