= Angela Rippon =

English television presenter (born 1944)

Angela Rippon CBE
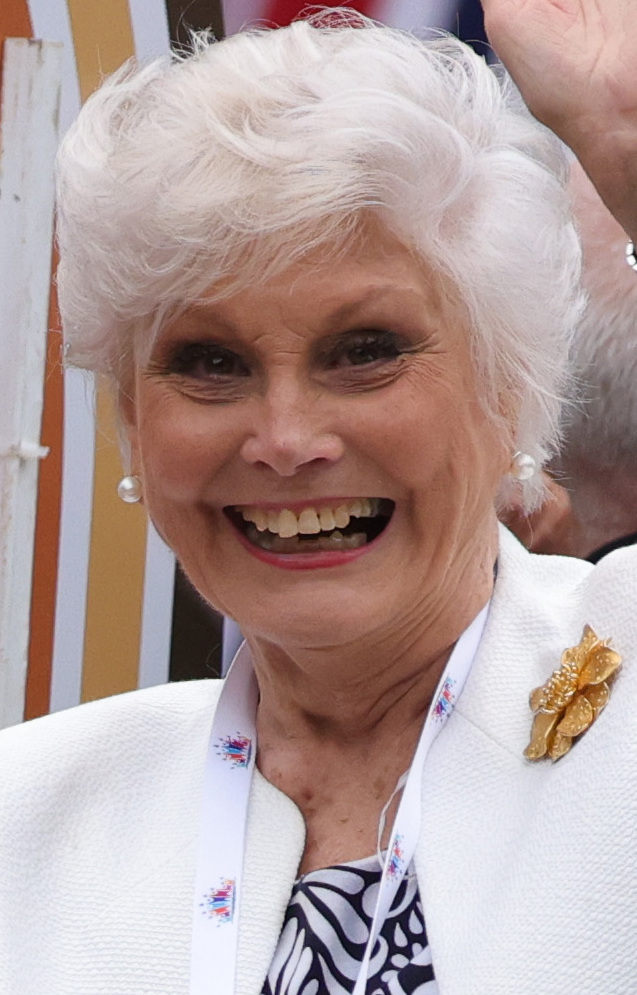
- Rippon in 2022
- Born: Angela May Rippon; 12 October 1944 (age 82); Plymouth, Devon, England
- Occupations: Journalist; newsreader; writer; presenter
- Years active: 1966–present
- Notable credits: BBC News; Come Dancing; Rip Off Britain; Holiday Hit Squad; Amazing Greys; GB News
- Spouse: Christopher Dare (m. 1967; div. 1989)
- Relatives: Clive Nattress (cousin)

Angela May Rippon (born 12 October 1944) is an English broadcaster, former newsreader, writer and journalist.

Rippon presented radio and television news programmes in South West England before moving to BBC One's Nine O'Clock News, becoming a regular presenter in 1975. She was the first female journalist to be given a permanent role presenting the BBC national television news, and the third female news presenter to appear on national broadcasts on British television, after Barbara Mandell on Independent Television News (ITN) in 1955, and Nan Winton, who temporarily presented the national news on BBC Television, in 1960.

Rippon appeared on a Morecambe and Wise Christmas Show in 1976, presented the first two series of Top Gear and also presented Come Dancing. She hosted the Eurovision Song Contest 1977. She was a presenter on, and co-founder of, breakfast television franchisee TV-am. In the 1990s, she moved to radio, presenting daily news programmes for LBC Newstalk between 1990 and 1994, and appeared on Channel 4's The Big Breakfast as a stand-in newsreader. She presented the BBC broadcast of the United Kingdom Ballroom Championships at the Bournemouth International Centre in 1991.

Rippon has written 14 books, toured with a production of Anything Goes and presented a segment of BBC1's The One Show. From 2009 until her departure in 2024, she co-presented the BBC One consumer show Rip Off Britain with Gloria Hunniford and Julia Somerville; in 2013 and 2014 she hosted Holiday Hit Squad alongside Helen Skelton and Joe Crowley. She was also the voiceover for the BBC1 game show The Wall and can currently be seen presenting occasionally on GB News. She also appeared as a contestant on the sixth series of Dancing on Ice in 2011, and the twenty-first series of Strictly Come Dancing in 2023, the latter of which she was the oldest ever contestant.

== Early life ==
Angela May Rippon was born on 12 October 1944 in Plymouth, Devon, into a working-class family. Her father, John, was a Royal Marine; she first saw him in 1947 when he returned from World War II. Rippon's Scottish mother, Edna, worked at a fine china company called Lawley's and was also a seamstress. She attended Public Secondary School for Girls, Cobourg Street in Plymouth.

== Career ==
After leaving school at 17, Rippon joined the photographic office of the Western Morning News and worked for the Sunday Independent, and later, BBC local radio and Westward Television as an editor.

=== Television and radio ===
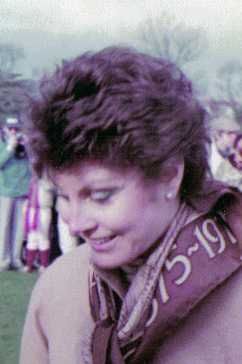
Rippon filming the opening titles of Good Morning Britain in 1983

In 1966, aged 21, Rippon began her television career at BBC South West in Plymouth. She subsequently became a reporter for BBC TV news. Rippon first presented a national news programme on BBC2 in 1974. For a fortnight, she replaced newsreader Richard Baker – who was on holiday – on BBC One's Nine O'Clock News, and she was offered a permanent newsreading role on that programme in 1975.

Rippon was described by some newspapers as the first female television newsreader. However, ITN's Barbara Mandell pre-dated her, having first appeared on the second night of ITV in 1955; Nan Winton was the first female BBC newsreader in 1960, and Mary Marquis had already been BBC Scotland's main newsreader for a few years. Rippon was the first female journalist to read the news regularly on national television.

In an interview with The Guardian, she said: "You just become an automated autocue reader and if you've half a brain you want an opportunity to use it. When I read the Nine O'Clock News, I kept my brain active by working on programmes like Antiques Roadshow (which she briefly hosted in 1979), Top Gear and In the Country." Rippon was a guest in the 1976 Morecambe and Wise Christmas Show, first appearing behind a BBC newsdesk, then emerging to perform a high-kicking dance routine. Her appearance was so popular she made a cameo appearance in the following year's show, in which she was revealed to be one of a chorus line. Rippon later presented the long-running show Come Dancing.

Rippon hosted the 1977 Eurovision Song Contest at the Wembley Conference Centre in London. She was the first presenter of BBC television's Top Gear, presenting the motoring programme from 1977 to 1979. Rippon appeared briefly on TV-am following its launch in 1983. There was a much publicised exit from TV-am—the two women were sacked, and also later discovered that they were being paid much less than the men. At the time, working for commercial television was considered to rule out ever working again for the BBC; Rippon said later that she thought for a year that her television career was over: "What would I have done if it was the end of my career? I would have just picked up a camera and applied for jobs as a photojournalist again." She worked as an Arts and Entertainments correspondent for WHDH-TV (then known as WNEV) in Boston, Massachusetts, US for a brief period, winning an Emmy for a documentary she made, and was able to work in Britain again.

Rippon co-presented the BBC's coverage of the wedding of the Prince of Wales and Lady Diana Spencer on 29 July 1981 and BBC One's coverage of the 1979 UK general election results. In the mid-1980s, she hosted the quiz show, Masterteam on BBC One, and hosted ITV's revival of the panel game What's My Line? from 1989 to 1990. In 1990, she also hosted a game show, Matchpoint, that was based on tennis format. She also became a regular presenter on BBC Radio 2, often sitting in for Jimmy Young and presenting a seasonal Friday night show from 1986 to 1989.

From 1990 to 1994, she presented Angela Rippon's Morning Report, a daily radio news programme on LBC Newstalk, and, later, Angela Rippon's Drivetime. She was a stand-in newsreader on Channel 4's The Big Breakfast until 2002. In 2005, Rippon co-hosted a series of Sun, Sea and Bargain Spotting for BBC 2 and in April 2006, she toured the UK as a cast member of the musical Anything Goes. In 2007, she became a presenter on Cash in the Attic, a BBC One daytime television programme broadcast where presenters meet members of the general public, who seek out valuables and antiques to be sold at auction, in their homes.

In 1997, Rippon presented the Channel 4 show Game of War with co-presenter Paddy Griffith, a programme that re-enacted historic battles on the wargames table with modern-day military commanders re-fighting the battles. The show only aired for three episodes. The battles re-fought were Battle of Naseby (14 June 1645), Battle of Waterloo (18 June 1815) and Battle of Balaklava (25 October 1854).

In 2010, Rippon appeared as a guest judge on the ITV show Dancing on Ice, covering for Robin Cousins. The following year, she returned to the show as a contestant in the sixth series on 9 January 2011, with her professional partner, Canadian ice skater Sean Rice, she failed to qualify for the competition and was eliminated alongside Nadia Sawalha and Mark Hanretty. In March 2011, she appeared with Lenny Henry, Samantha Womack and Reggie Yates in a BBC documentary to raise funds for Comic Relief. It was called Famous, Rich and in the Slums, and showed four celebrities travelling to Kibera in Kenya, Africa's largest slum. In 2011 she joined The One Show, presenting a five-minute slot called "Rippon's Britain".

On 19 November 2011, Rippon appeared on Children in Need, performing alongside BBC newsreaders Sian Williams, Susanna Reid, Sophie Raworth, and Emily Maitlis in a special one-off edition of Strictly Come Dancing. In the same month she worked briefly on BBC Radio 5 Live as a stand-in presenter on the Double Take programme.

Rippon joined the BBC again, as a co-presenter on the BBC One show Holiday Hit Squad in 2013, alongside Joe Crowley and Helen Skelton. The show returned for a second series in March 2014.

In 2014, Rippon co-hosted the ITV Saturday night entertainment series Amazing Greys alongside Paddy McGuinness. The show lasted for just one series. In April 2016, she co-presented the two-part BBC One series How to Stay Young.

In May 2018, Rippon was a co-presenter of live coverage of the wedding of Prince Harry and Meghan Markle for the Seven Network (Australia) alongside Michael Usher and Melissa Doyle.

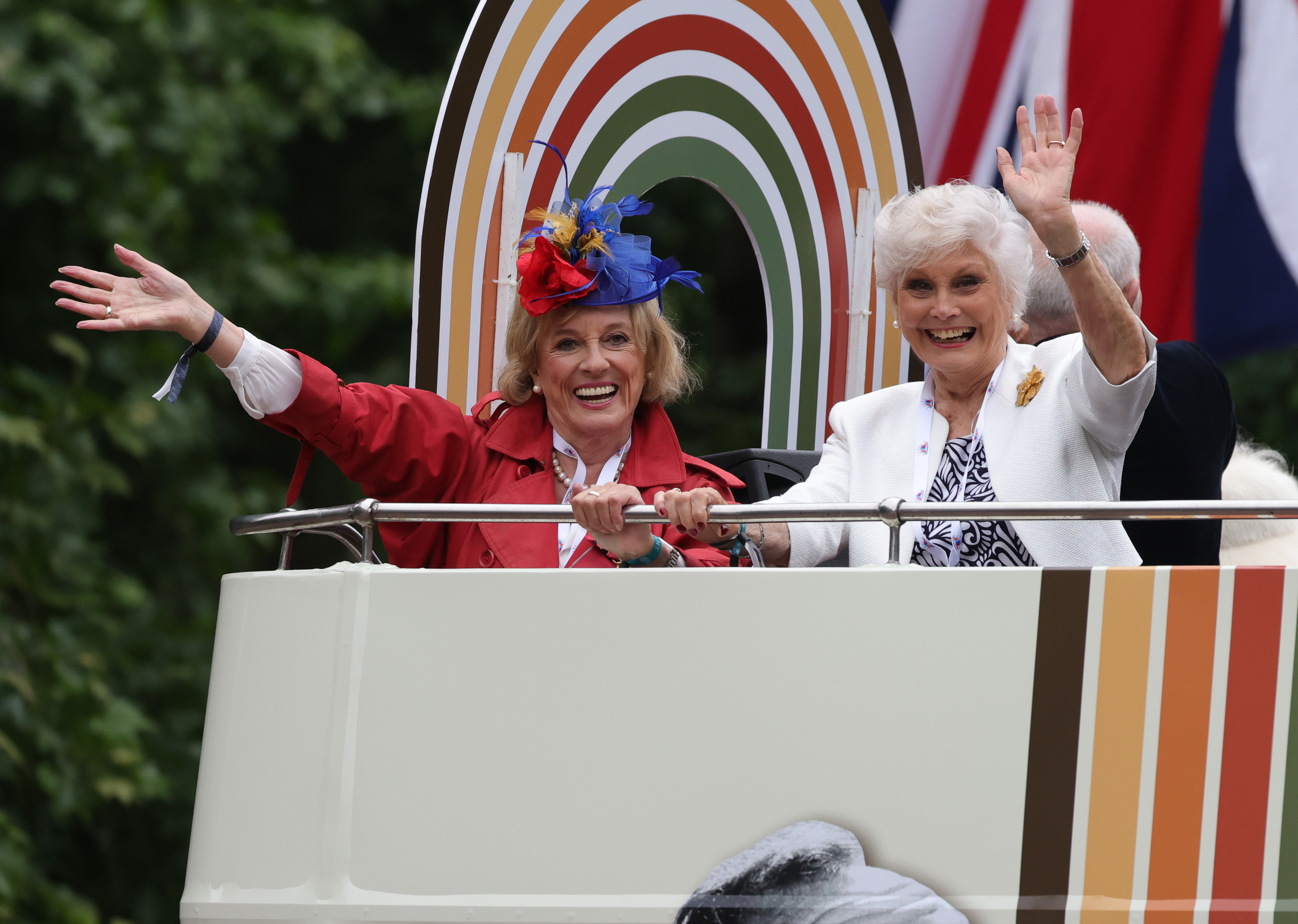
Rippon and Esther Rantzen in the Elizabeth II Platinum Jubilee Pageant

In September 2022, Rippon provided analysis on the Australian television broadcaster Seven Network's coverage of the death and state funeral of Elizabeth II as a royal commentator. She has been a stand-in presenter on GB News, first alongside Eamonn Holmes on the breakfast programme, and then on Alastair Stewart and Friends. She regularly stands-in for the Sunday with Michael Portillo slot on GB News, and in 2026, discussed the Labour Party Conference with guest contributors.

In August 2023, it was announced that she would be taking part in the twenty-first series of Strictly Come Dancing, more than thirty years after hosting the original version of the show Come Dancing. Rippon, who turned 79 whilst participating in the series, is the oldest contestant in the show's history.

=== Books ===
In the early 1980s, Rippon put her name to a series of ghost-written children's books about a character called "Victoria Plum" that was published by Purnell and Sons. Victoria Plum was a tree fairy in "the Great Wood". Merchandise and a Christmas annual were released following the second series. In 1982, she wrote a book Mark Phillips, the Man and His Horses, about the Princess Royal's then husband. Rippon has since written keep-fit guides for older people, including Stay Active, Stay Supple, Stay Healthy.

=== Other activities ===
Rippon is patron of the Old Time Dance Society. In 2010, she attended the society's 25th Anniversary Ball of the Year. In 2000, Rippon was appointed chair of English National Ballet. After several years of involvement, she resigned in late 2003 following complaints and briefings about her leadership style, which was described as "schoolmistressy" and "imperious".

== Personal life ==
In 1967 at the age of 22, she married Christopher Dare, an engineer. They separated in 1989, divorcing later. They had no children. Rippon has said that her marriage ending was very painful, and that her celebrity status was one factor. She has had subsequent long-term relationships, but has stated she is happy being single. She is a cousin of the former Darlington F.C. player Clive Nattress.

Rippon lives in Kensington, west London. In March 2000 she was attacked in the street by two muggers in Notting Hill, west London. The two men grabbed her around the neck and pushed her to the ground, stealing her handbag and credit cards. In December 2001 she was mugged for a second time in London. She was grabbed from behind by two men who threatened to break her fingers if she did not hand over her jewellery. The attackers stole two rings and a Rolex watch, and pulled her diamond earrings out. Her handbag containing cash, credit cards and a mobile phone was also taken.

== Honours and awards ==
She was the subject of This Is Your Life in 1981 when she was surprised by Eamonn Andrews while signing copies of her newly published book in a store at the Brent Cross Shopping Centre.

Rippon was appointed Officer of the Order of the British Empire (OBE) in the 2004 Birthday Honours.

Rippon was awarded an honorary doctorate of Arts from Plymouth University in 2012.

She was appointed Commander of the Order of the British Empire (CBE) in the 2017 New Year Honours for services to dementia care in her role as development lead with Dementia Friendly Communities.

== Filmography ==
| Year | Title | Role | Notes |
|---|---|---|---|
| 1976–1981 | BBC Nine O'Clock News | Newsreader | |
| 1977 | Eurovision Song Contest | Presenter | |
| 1977–1978 | Top Gear | Co-presenter | |
| 1979 | Antiques Roadshow | Presenter | |
| 1983 | Good Morning Britain | Co-presenter | |
| 1983 | Daybreak | Co-presenter | |
| 1985–1987 | Masterteam | Presenter | |
| 1988–1991, 1998 | Come Dancing | Presenter | |
| 1988–1990 | What's My Line? | Presenter | |
| 1990 | A Summer Journey with Angela Rippon | Presenter | Travelling the length of the Kennet and Avon Canal. Produced by BBC West |
| 1990 | Matchpoint | Presenter | |
| 1997 | Game of War | Co-presenter | 3 episodes, with Paddy Griffith |
| 2007–2013 | Cash in the Attic | Presenter | 5 episodes |
| 2009–2024 | Rip Off Britain | Co-presenter | |
| 2010 | Dancing on Ice | Guest judge | 1 episode |
| 2011 | Dancing on Ice | Contestant | Series 6 |
| 2011 | Famous, Rich and in the Slums | Participant | |
| 2013–2014 | Holiday Hit Squad | Co-presenter | With Helen Skelton and Joe Crowley |
| 2014 | Amazing Greys | Co-presenter | With Paddy McGuinness |
| 2016— | How to Stay Young | Co-presenter | With Chris van Tulleken |
| 2017 | Holding Back the Years | Presenter | |
| 2017— | Health: Truth or Scare | Co-presenter | With Kevin Duala |
| 2019 | The Truth About...Antibiotics | Presenter | |
| 2019–2022 | The Wall | Voiceover | |
| 2023 | Elizabeth II: Making of a Monarch | Narrator | Two-part documentary |
| 2023 | Strictly Come Dancing | Contestant | Series 21 |
| 2025 | Father Brown | The Dancing Duchess | Series 12 Episode 6: The Lord of the Dance |
| 2026 | Angela Rippon's River Cruises | Presenter | Travel series |

Media offices
| Preceded by Bruce Parker | Host of Antiques Roadshow; 1979 | Succeeded by Arthur Negus |
| Preceded by Corry Brokken | Eurovision Song Contest presenter 1977 | Succeeded by Léon Zitrone and Denise Fabre |
