= Masterteam =

- Genre: Game show
- Presented by: Angela Rippon
- Country of origin: United Kingdom
- Original language: English
- No. of series: 3
- No. of episodes: 135

Production
- Production location: The Greenwood Theatre
- Running time: 25 minutes

Original release
- Network: BBC One
- Release: 21 October 1985 – 21 December 1987

Masterteam is a BBC Television daytime quiz programme that aired on BBC One from 21 October 1985 until 21 December 1987. The programme was hosted by Angela Rippon.

== Format ==
Each game consisted of five rounds in the following order: Team Challenge, Spotlight, In a Spin, Spotlight, Team Challenge. Two teams of three members each competed.

=== Team Challenge ===
Each Team Challenge consisted of 60 seconds' worth of quick-fire questions on the buzzer, open to all players. A correct answer awarded two points, while a miss gave one point to the opponents and allowed them a chance to answer for another point.

=== In a Spin ===
For the In a Spin round, three letters of the alphabet were chosen at random and the teams had 30 seconds to form the longest single word they could, starting with the first letter and containing the other two in the given order. (For example, "ALB" could be used in "albumen" or "alabaster," but not "abolish.") The team with the longer valid word scored five points.

=== Spotlight ===
In each Spotlight round, one team chose an opponent, who selected a category from a list of six and had 60 seconds to answer as many questions as possible. Each correct answer was worth two points. Both teams were given a chance to play this round separately; the same list of categories was used throughout the game, with categories being removed as they were chosen. The team in the lead after the first Team Challenge chose an opponent to start the first Spotlight round, while the trailing team after In a Spin had this choice for the second one. No individual contestant could play more than one Spotlight round per game.

== Winners and losers ==
The team with the higher score after five rounds won the game and remained on the show to face a new challenger. Teams were awarded Bronze, Silver, or Gold Medal status for winning two, three, or four games, respectively, and any team with four wins retired from the show. At the end of each series, the eight best-performing teams (ranked first by medal status, then by total score), returned for a single-elimination tournament. These games included an additional round format, It's All Yours, in which each team had 60 seconds to answer as many questions as possible for two points each. Team members were allowed to confer with each other on these questions, with the captain answering for the team. The trailing team before each It's All Yours round played first.

The sequence of rounds in each tournament game was as follows: Team Challenge, It's All Yours, Spotlight, In a Spin, Spotlight, In a Spin, It's All Yours, Team Challenge.

== Transmissions ==
Series	Start date	End date	Episodes
1	21 October 1985	20 December 1985	45
2	20 October 1986	19 December 1986	45
3	19 October 1987	21 December 1987	45
