= Savage Planet (TV series) =

Television series

Production
- Production location: United Kingdom

Savage Planet is a 2000s documentary series produced for ITV in the United Kingdom, and for PBS in the United States. It focused on floods, hurricanes, landslides and other natural phenomena, telling the stories of those who have come face to face with some of nature's most awesome events or who live in some of the world's most inhospitable conditions. The series was first aired on 13 March 2000, and was narrated by the actor Ian Holm. It later aired on 6 June 2000 in the US, and was narrated by the actor Stacy Keach.

Savage Planet followed three earlier related documentary series which were broadcast during the 1990s. Savage Skies focused on weather phenomenons such as tornadoes, thunderstorms and snowstorms, and was broadcast in 1996. In 1998, Savage Earth was a four-part series that covered subjects such as volcanic eruptions, tsunami and earthquakes. In 1999, another four-part series, Savage Seas focused on subjects such as shark attacks, shipwrecks, and El Niño. All of these series were also narrated by Ian Holm. In the US, the first series was narrated by Al Roker and the remaining series were narrated by Stacy Keach.
