= Matchpoint (game show) =

- Genre: Game show
- Presented by: Angela Rippon
- Voices of: Charles Nove
- Country of origin: United Kingdom
- Original language: English
- No. of series: 1
- No. of episodes: 32

Production
- Running time: 25 minutes
- Production company: BBC Elstree

Original release
- Network: BBC1
- Release: 17 April – 14 June 1990

Matchpoint is a British game show that aired on BBC1 from 17 April to 14 June 1990. It is hosted by Angela Rippon.

== Format ==
In each edition, two teams of two contestants compete for a place in the quarterfinals by answering questions. For each correct answer, they score points as in a tennis match—15, 30, 40, Game. Each program is played as the best of three "sets", and the team that wins two sets wins the show and advances to the quarterfinals, while the losing team receives a bottle of champagne and a punnet of strawberries.

The prize for the winning team at the end was a trip to that year's Wimbledon event.
