= Clive Nattress =

English footballer

Personal information
- Full name: Clive Nattress
- Date of birth: 24 May 1951 (age 75)
- Place of birth: Durham, England
- Height: 6 ft 0 in (1.83 m)
- Position: Defender

Senior career*
Years	Team	Apps	(Gls)
- Consett
1970–1972	Blackpool	0	(0)
1972–1980	Darlington	302	(15)
1980–1981	Halifax Town	37	(5)
1981–198?	Bishop Auckland		
1983–1985	Crook Town		
1985–1986	Darlington	1	(0)
- Ferryhill Athletic

Managerial career
- 1983–1984: Crook Town (player-manager)
- * Club domestic league appearances and goals

Clive Nattress (born 24 May 1951) is an English former footballer who made 340 appearances in the Football League playing as a defender for Darlington and Halifax Town in the 1970s and 1980s. He also played for Consett, Blackpool (though not for the first team), Bishop Auckland, Crook Town (as player-manager) and Ferryhill Athletic. While still a Darlington player, he took part as a guest in Crook Town's pioneering tour to India in 1976.

Nattress was born in Durham. He is a cousin of the newsreader Angela Rippon.
