= Marjorie Lynette Sigley =

English artist, writer and actress

Marjorie Lyette Sigley 'Sigi'
- Born: 22 December 1928; Buxton, Derbyshire, England
- Died: 13 August 1997 (aged 68); London, England
- Education: Goldsmiths College, London; University of Manchester
- Known for: Directing, Painting, drawing, printmaking, writing
- Movement: Modern art

Marjorie Lynette Sigley (22 December 1928 – 13 August 1997), also known as Sigi, was an English artist, writer, actress, teacher, choreographer, theatre director and television producer. She was instrumental in establishing, developing and promoting forms of youth theatre and television in both the United Kingdom and the United States of America.

== Life and work ==
Marjorie Sigley was born on 22 December 1928, known to everyone as "Sigi", she took arts and would travel distances to see a play, a ballet, or an opera. But she also believed in art as an educational force, and her achievement lay in pioneering the same attitude towards children's drama. Sigley not only introduced thousands of children to what she called "the wonder of theatre", she also involved them directly in the making of it.

Sigley came from "a solid, very traditional" working-class family in Buxton, Derbyshire, where her father worked for ICI and her mother was a professional cook. From the age of 10, she became an avid consumer of movies and plays, going to everything that was staged at the Buxton repertory theatre. As a student she attended Goldsmiths College, London, studying theatre, music and dance.

She was awarded a fellowship at Manchester University's drama department and it was there that she began to develop her (then novel) concept of children's drama. She became involved in theatre workshops and participation theatre, taking groups of her students to the Brighton Festival with their work. She was later to direct the Malcolm Williamson opera Julius Caesar Jones as part of the festival's opera workshops.

She returned to London to a teaching career, which she combined with her drama activities. At Markfield and Woodlands Park Schools in North London, she began by adapting stage classics for performance by young children who mostly come from underprivileged backgrounds. The children were also encouraged to write, cast, design, produce and star in their own productions. In 1960, Marjorie founded the City Literary Drama Company. This presented its own work, ranging from original pantomimes to experimental mime and movement workshops at the City Lit Theatre, with people such as Ronald Smith Wilson, Claud Newman, and Dorothea Alexander. In 1968 the company visited Warsaw, Leningrad and Moscow with its children's drama programmes.

In the meantime she worked as a director and writer at the Mermaid Theatre, notably directing a stage version of Erich Kästner's Emil and the Detectives. She was invited for two spells, 1962 and 1968–69, at the Habimah National Theatre of Israel and in 1964 did a Youth Theatre tour of Czechoslovakia.

She had also taken the step into television in 1964 when she was invited to demonstrate what children's drama could achieve in a late-night ABC programme. Her contribution, which graphically demonstrated how the potentially destructive energies of teenage boys in a London suburb could be channelled creatively, made a profound impression. She was busy in television thereafter, one of her most striking contributions being Wonderworld, two 13-part series in which children in the 5–6 and 15–16 age groups, dramatised and acted stories from the Bible.

In 1965 Marjorie Sigley introduced the Five O'Clock Funfair (Rediffusion, 1965) a spin-off series which regularly featured amongst others, music icons Lulu and Alexis Korner.

Like all her programmes, these were outstanding for their intimate engagement with the lives and opinions of children. In 1966, she formed the Young People's Theatre Project to train primary school teachers on how to bring her methods into the classroom. And in 1969 she also ran workshops for the Royal Shakespeare Company at the Roundhouse and the Brighton Festival, which were significant forerunners of the educational programmes run by arts institutions today. In the autumn of the same year she delivered a talk on Children's Drama to the Youth Libraries Group.

=== America ===
In 1968, the American actress Uta Hagen watched one of Sigley's workshops at the Roundhouse and was so impressed by its revolutionary methods she invited her to New York. There Marjorie directed plays at the renowned Herbert Berghof (H.B.) Studios, Bank Street, New York, and also founded the Young People's Theater at City Center, which she directed from 1969 to 1975 where, with a group of actors, she wrote and staged 45 plays for children, as well as directing workshops involving them in the creation and performance of their own shows. Correspondence between Uta Hagen and Marjorie Sigley is held by The New York Public Library. In 1970 the Prime Minister Edward Heath gave a speech supporting and praising Marjorie's youth theatre work. Also around this time (1971–1974) she became friends with Lucy Kroll, the founder and grande dame of Kroll Agency. Correspondence between Sigley and Kroll is held in the Manuscript Division of the Library of Congress, Washington, D.C..

She remained in the United States for several years more, founding and running her own company, Sigley's Young People's Theatre in New York in 1976, before moving to Los Angeles the following year to write a screenplay. In 1977 she was awarded the Jennie Heiden Award for her work with children's theatre, by the American Alliance for Theatre and Education (AATE).

Sigley's phenomenally buoyant energy found outlets in many other projects. She wrote several plays, such as Take A Fable – a children's musical about an Animal Bill of Rights. It was first performed at the Edinburgh Festival, then produced successfully in New York as well as other Eastern states. In 1976 Take a Fable was performed by the Children's Touring Theatre Company of Stage West whose performance gained an entry in The Best Play's of 1976–1977. She also directed an opera for the Brighton Festival. In 1978 she wrote the award-winning ABC special One of a Kind, and in 1980 wrote and co-produced the feature film Never Never Land. Never Never Land (1979) originally known as Second to the Right and Straight on Until Morning starred Petula Clark and Anne Seymour as a seven-year-old girl, unhappy and isolated as a result of her parents' divorce, she escapes by recreating a modern-day version of the Peter Pan myth.

=== Thames Television ===
In 1983, she returned to England to become controller of children's programmes at Thames Television. She was critical of what she saw as the dumbing down of television, believing it had lost its confidence both as an educator of children's minds and as a catalyst for their imaginations.

Nevertheless, at Thames she set to work with her usual enthusiasm and energy to try to improve things, and was able to bring some highly stimulating work to the screen. Among this was the series The Wall Game, which had classes of schoolchildren involved in constructional building and improvisation. The series was chosen to represent Britain at the 1985 Tokyo World Fair. The T-Bag was set round a wicked witch and a small boy who assists her, while C.A.B. was a mystery detection series for 8 to 11-year-olds.

==== T-Bag ====
Lee Pressman one of the writers on T-bag, recounted:

the idea for the series started when the head of children's television at Thames, Marjorie Sigley, decided that she wanted to make a series of "educational" shows about words and letters of the alphabet. The first of the shows was "Words words words", a mishmash of cobbled together sketches, songs and poems. I had been writing BBC's "Play Away" (a far superior light entertainment fest), and Thames TV blatantly asked me whether I had any unused stuff in my bottom drawer that I could contribute to "Words" since they were a tad short on material. Little did I know that many other writers were being asked the very same question... and one of them was Grant Cathro. And that's where we met.After that short-lived series, Marjorie asked me to come up with an idea that would feature letters of the alphabet this time. I pitched something which I believe was called "Dotty in Dictionaria" – a story about a young girl who travels across a board game where every square features a different letter of the alphabet. There were various suggestions for adventures such as "Revenge of the Killer B" on the 'B' square, etc. and so on.When I was given the go ahead to develop the series (at very short notice), I contacted Grant and asked if he wanted to help write it.

Another writer of the series, Grant Cathro corroborated:

Lee and I first met in a South London rehearsal room, where five frantic grinning actors were hurriedly trying to learn their parts in comedy sketches which Lee and I had been commissioned to write independently. The show was called "Words, Words, Words" (or as it became affectionately known, "Worst, Worst, Worst"), the brainchild of Marjorie Sigley, Head of Children's Programmes at Thames TV. She was trying to disguise education-based material as pure light entertainment, which seemed quite an interesting challenge. Other writers were involved too, but somehow Lee and I became the main contributors and so we began seeing a lot of each other's work at the following readthroughs. I thought Lee's stuff was annoyingly good, and he thought my stuff was irritatingly splendid, so when Lee was later given the go-ahead to develop a comedy-drama which shared similar aspirations to the one-off "Words" series, he rang and asked if I would like to collaborate. Up until this time I had trained and worked mostly as an actor (Glasgow Citizens Theatre, Lyric Hammersmith, Royal Shakespeare Company) but because I also loved writing (and had a tax bill to pay) I immediately said "certainly".

== Art and later life ==
Marjorie was also a very talented artist – she worked in a variety of mediums particularly favouring printmaking. Her subjects were predominantly influenced by the theatre, and were bold and expressive especially in the use of colour and the large format she favoured. After leaving Thames in 1986 she maintained both her live drama and television work, but devoted a larger amount of time to her artwork. In the late 1980s an exhibition of her work titled Recent Prints was held at the Footstool Gallery, St John Smith Square, London.

In 1994, when her cancer was diagnosed, she bought a computer and desk-top published children's books about two stage-struck teddy bears. The dauntless spirit of her heroes Algie and Worthing reflects Sigley's own untiring curiosity, her humour, and her love affair with her work. Marjorie died of cancer aged 68 on 13 August 1997.

In 1999 a play Marjorie adapted was posthumously published in an anthology of festive plays. The Mummers' play was originally adapted by Marjorie for presentation by students and faculty of the H.B. Studio, a theatre school in New York City as a holiday gift to their families and friends. The play begins as men of the village arrive in the local tavern to be cast in an amateur production of St. George and the Dragon. Silliness reigns as the participants are cast in their roles for a variety of reasons—none of which have anything to do with talent. The second act is the performance of the play, granting "real" actors an opportunity to play wonderfully broad and physical comedy. The play does require a large cast of eighteen or more. All action takes place within the confines of the village hall, with minimal props. This script offers an excellent opportunity for ensemble work. It does require the cast to sing, but great musical skill is not a necessity.

== Work ==
Art exhibitions:

- Footstool Gallery, St John Smith Square, London

Books:

- Three Harlequin Plays (1961) OCLC 504271052 ASIN B0000CL6QT
- Saint George and the dragon at Christmas tide (anonymous) adapted by Marjorie Sigley in Swortzell, L. (eds) The twelve plays of Christmas (1999) ISBN 1-55783-402-4

Plays:

- Take A Fable (1976) Writer
- A Review in Mime and Movement – Director (London Theatre Company/Russia and Poland)
- The Stoppers (1967) – Director (performed as part of the Brighton Festival at the Palace Pier theatre)
- Timesneeze (1970) Director

Film:

- Georgy Girl (1966) choreographer
- Never Never Land (1979) Screenwriter (also known as Second to the Right and Straight on Until Morning)
- The Flowering Eye (1979) Screenwriter
- The Jumble

Television:

- One Of A Kind – (1978) writer & associate director
- Five O'Clock Funfair (1965) presenter
- London Line (1968)
- Algy And Worthing
- Catch Us If You Can
- C.A.B. (1986–1989) Executive Producer
- Danger – Marmalade At Work! (1984) producer
- Educating Marmalade producer
- Wonderworld
- T-Bag (1985–1992) Executive producer
- What's in a Game
