= Joe Crowley (presenter) =

British journalist

Joe Crowley is an English television presenter and broadcast journalist, best known for presenting and reporting on Countryfile and The One Show as well as for his environmental investigations on BBC Panorama and ITV's Tonight programme.

== Early life ==
Crowley grew up in Norwich, Norfolk, and gained a degree in history at Magdalene College, Cambridge University, and a post-graduate diploma in broadcast journalism from City University London.

== Career ==
In his early career, Crowley worked for Inside Out South, which saw him nominated as 'Young Journalist of the Year' at the National RTS awards and earned him the 'Regional TV Personality of the Year' title at the RTS Southern Awards.

Crowley is currently a reporter for the BBC One magazine show The One Show. In 2011, 2012 and 2016, he guest hosted The One Show for a few episodes.

Crowley presented Country Tracks from 2009 until 2011, three series of Britain's Empty Homes and Britain's Empty Homes Revisited from 2012 until 2014, Turn Back Time in 2012, and Save My Holiday in 2011.

In 2012, with Suzannah Lipscomb, Crowley presented three episodes of Bloody Tales of the Tower for National Geographic (American TV channel), followed in 2013 by eight episodes of Bloody Tales of Europe.

He co-presented two series of the factual BBC One programme Holiday Hit Squad with Angela Rippon and Helen Skelton. He narrated the Animal Frontline and the Helicopter Heroes Down Under series in 2013.

In 2014, Crowley co-presented the Channel 5 series Police 5 with Kate McIntyre.

In the autumn of 2014 he joined the popular Sunday evening BBC One programme Countryfile and regularly presents the programme alongside various co-hosts.

Crowley now specialises in environmental journalism, producing a number of hard-hitting Panorama investigations. In 2021 he was the first to reveal the illegal dumping of sewage by water companies in England and Wales in Panorama's River Pollution Scandal.

In 2022 Crowley reported on Drax's production of wood pellets in British Columbia that are burned at their Yorkshire power station. The Green Energy Scandal Exposed revealed that Drax successfully bid for logging licenses in British Columbia and cut down precious primary forests, contrary to their environmental claims.

In December 2023, Crowley's The Water Pollution Cover-Up Panorama exposed the lack of regulation of water companies in England. Focusing on United Utilities, the investigation revealed evidence suggesting that pollution incidents are covered-up so they don't appear in the official pollution incident figures.

=== Charity ===
Crowley is a supporter of The Anthony Nolan Trust and ran the 2014 London Marathon for the charity.
