= Game of War =

- Presented by: Angela Rippon
- Country of origin: United Kingdom
- Original language: English
- No. of series: 1
- No. of episodes: 3

Original release
- Network: Channel 4
- Release: 3 August – 17 August 1997

Game of War was a 1997 Channel 4 television series presented by Angela Rippon. In each episode, military officers and historians played a wargame based on, in particular, Strategos. The wargames analyst was Iain Dickie. The umpires were Paddy Griffith and Arthur Harman.

== Episodes ==
- Episode 1 was broadcast on Sunday 3 August 1997. The wargame was the Battle of Balaclava. The wargame was played by Richard Swinburn and Major General Anthony George Clifford Jones (1923-1999).
- Episode 2 was broadcast on Sunday 10 August 1997. The wargame was the Battle of Naseby. The wargame was played by Thomas Boyd-Carpenter and Julian Thompson.
- Episode 3 was broadcast on Sunday 17 August 1997. The wargame was the Battle of Waterloo. The wargame was played by Anthony Farrar-Hockley and John Kiszely.

== Reception ==
Rees called the series "gimmicky". Dunkley complained that the wargames were played with something that resembled the layout for a Hornby Dublo model railway set.

== See also ==
- Battleground (1978 TV series)
