= The Wall Game =

- Starring: Helen Bennett; Hal Lehrman; Anthony Johns; Sinitta; Deborah Goodman; John Ramm
- Country of origin: United Kingdom
- No. of series: 2
- No. of episodes: 25

Production
- Executive producer: Marjorie Lynette Sigley
- Producer: Stan Woodward
- Running time: 30 minutes

Original release
- Network: ITV (CITV)
- Release: 16 April 1985 – 2 April 1986

The Wall Game is a 1985 children's television game show produced by Thames Television for ITV. The show was based on the idea of a theatre workshop and would see two groups of contestants building sets from pieces of a giant wall, then improvising a play. The programme was conceived and presented by Hal Lehrman Jr and also starred Helen Bennett, Anthony Johns and Sinitta (who also performed the theme song) in series one. Deborah Goodman, Andrie Reid and John Ramm joined Lehrman and Johns in series two. The series was chosen to represent Britain at the 1985 Tokyo World's Fair.

== Transmission guide ==
- Series 1: 13 editions from 16 April 1985 – 9 July 1985
- Series 2: 12 editions from 8 January 1986 – 2 April 1986
