= List of British game shows =

This is a list of British game shows. A game show is a type of radio, television, or internet programming genre in which contestants, television personalities or celebrities, sometimes as part of a team, play a game which involves answering questions or solving puzzles usually for money and/or prizes.

== Activity-orientated ==
- 99 to Beat
- The Adventure Game
- Ben 10: Ultimate Challenge
- The Button
- Cannonball
- Can't Touch This
- Copycats
- The Crystal Maze
- The Desert Forges
- Distraction
- Don't Scare the Hare
- Endurance UK
- Fear Factor
- Fort Boyard
- Fort Boyard: Ultimate Challenge
- Friends Like These
- Gladiators
- Go for It
- The Great Egg Race
- In for a Penny
- Incredible Games
- Interceptor
- International King of Sports
- Iron Chef UK
- It's a Knockout
- Jungle Run
- Knightmare
- Ninja Warrior UK
- Pets Win Prizes
- Raven
- Remotely Funny
- Scrapheap Challenge
- Total Wipeout
- Treasure Hunt
- Y Siambr

== Dating/Relationship ==
- Baggage
- Blind Date
- Celebs Go Dating
- Celebrity Love Island
- Dating in the Dark
- Dinner Date
- ElimiDate
- First Dates
- God's Gift
- It's Not Me, It's You
- The Love Machine
- Love Island
- Love Island: All Stars
- Love Me, Love Me Not
- Love on a Saturday Night
- Man O Man
- The Marriage Ref
- Meet the Parents
- Mr. & Mrs.
- Naked Attraction
- Newlyweds
- The Other Half
- Perfect Match
- Playdate
- Senseless
- Singled Out
- Streetmate
- Sweethearts
- Take Me Out
- There's Something About Miriam
- Undercover Lovers

== Panel games ==
In these, celebrities compete, usually in two teams.

- 8 Out of 10 Cats
- 10 O'Clock Live
- 24 Hour Panel People
- 29 Minutes of Fame
- Absolute Cobblers
- Act Your Age (radio)
- Alan Davies Après-Ski
- A League of Their Own
- Alexander Armstrong's Big Ask
- All About Two
- And Then You Die
- Argumental
- As Seen on TV
- Ask Rhod Gilbert
- Best of the Worst
- The Big Fat Quiz of the Year
- Bognor or Bust
- The Book Quiz
- The Brain Drain
- The Brains Trust
- Bring Me the Head of Light Entertainment
- Bring the Noise
- The Bubble
- Call My Bluff
- CelebAbility
- Celebrity Juice
- Cluedo
- Comedy World Cup
- Cryer's Crackers
- Dara O Briain's Go 8 Bit
- The Dog Ate My Homework
- Don't Ask Me Ask Britain
- Duck Quacks Don't Echo
- Epic Win
- Face the Music
- The Fake News Show
- Fake Reaction
- Fast and Loose
- Gag-Tag
- Guessable
- Harry Hill's Alien Fun Capsule
- Have I Got News for You
- Hypothetical
- I Love My Country
- If I Ruled the World
- I'm Sorry I Haven't a Clue (radio)
- The Imitation Game
- Insert Name Here
- It's Only A Theory
- It's Only TV...but I Like It
- I've Got a Secret
- Jokers Wild
- Just a Minute (a regular BBC Radio 4 panel game, it appeared on TV briefly)
- The King Is Dead
- King Of...
- The Mad Bad Ad Show
- Mad Mad World
- Magic Numbers
- The Marriage Ref
- Mock the Week
- My Music
- The Name's the Same
- Never Mind the Buzzcocks
- The News Quiz (Radio 4's predecessor to Have I Got News For You)
- Odd One In
- Petrolheads
- Play to the Whistle
- Pop Quiz
- Punchlines
- QI
- Quote... Unquote
- Reality Bites
- Rob Brydon's Annually Retentive
- Safeword
- Shooting Stars
- Space Cadets
- Sweat the Small Stuff
- Taskmaster
- Tell the Truth
- That's Showbusiness
- There's Something About Movies
- They Think It's All Over
- Through the Keyhole
- Totally Top Trumps
- Twenty Questions
- Viral Tap
- Virtually Famous
- The Wall
- Wall Of Fame
- Was It Something I Said?
- We Need Answers
- The What in the World? Quiz
- What the Dickens
- What's My Line?
- Whodunnit?
- Whose Line Is It Anyway?
- Win, Lose or Draw
- Would I Lie to You?
- You Have Been Watching

== Puzzle-orientated ==
- 8 Out of 10 Cats Does Countdown
- All Clued Up
- Beat the Brain
- Brainbox Challenge
- BrainTeaser
- Catchphrase
- Catchword
- Chain Letters
- Connections
- Countdown
- Definition
- First Letter First
- Incognito
- Lingo
- Lucky Ladders
- Memory Bank
- Only Connect
- That's the Question
- TV Scrabble
- Wheel of Fortune
- Wordplay

== Quiz ==
- 1 & 6 Zeros
- The 1% Club
- 1 vs. 100
- 100%
- 1000 Heartbeats
- 1001 Things You Should Know
- The 21st Question
- 500 Questions
- 5 Gold Rings
- 5-Star Family Reunion
- The £64,000 Question
- Al Murray's Great British Pub Quiz
- Alphabetical
- The Answer Run
- The Answer Trap
- Are You Smarter than a 10 Year Old?
- Ask the Family
- Babushka
- Bank Balance
- The Bank Job
- Battle of the Brains
- Benchmark
- Blockbusters
- The Boss
- Brain of Britain
- Brainchild
- Brainstorm
- Breakaway
- Break the Safe
- Bridge of Lies
- Britain's Brainiest Kid
- Britain's Brightest Family
- Cash Cab
- Cash Trapped
- Catchpoint
- The Chair
- The Chase
- Chase the Case
- Chris Moyles' Quiz Night
- Cleverdicks
- The Code
- The Common Denominator
- Criss Cross Quiz
- Debatable
- Decimate
- Defectors
- Dirty Money
- Divided
- Don't Blow the Inheritance
- Don't Forget the Lyrics!
- Duel
- The Edge
- Eggheads
- Ejector Seat
- Eliminator
- The Exit List
- Face the Clock
- Fastest Finger First
- Fifteen to One
- The Finish Line
- Five Minutes to a Fortune
- Freeze Out
- The Fuse
- Gift Wrapped
- Going for Gold
- The Great Pretender
- Greed
- The Guess List
- Hardball
- Head Hunters
- The Hit List
- Hive Minds
- Holding Out for a Hero
- Horrible Histories: Gory Games
- I Literally Just Told You
- Impossible
- In It to Win It
- In With a Shout
- It's Not What You Know
- Jeopardy!
- The Kids Are All Right
- King of the Castle
- Knowitalls
- Lateral
- Lightning
- Limitless Win
- The Link
- Mastermind
- Masterteam
- The Million Pound Drop
- Mind the Gap
- The Mint
- Moneybags
- Moneyball
- One Hundred and Eighty
- One Question
- Only Connect
- The People Versus
- Perfection
- Picture Slam
- Playing for Time
- Pointless
- PokerFace
- Postcode Challenge
- Pressure Pad
- A Question of Genius
- Quizmania
- Quizness
- Rebound
- Richard Osman's House of Games
- Riddiculous
- Rolling In It
- Round Britain Quiz
- School's Out
- Screen Test
- Secret Fortune
- Sell Me the Answer
- Shafted
- Show Me the Telly
- Sitting on a Fortune
- Spin Star
- Stake Out
- Starstrider
- SUDO-Q
- The Switch
- Take It or Leave It
- Take On the Twisters
- Telly Addicts
- Tenable
- Think Tank
- Tipping Point
- Today's the Day
- Top Class
- Top of the Form
- The Tournament
- Twenty-One
- Two Tribes
- Unbeatable
- University Challenge
- The Vault
- The Waiting Game
- The Wall
- The Wave
- The Weakest Link
- The Wheel
- Who Wants to Be a Millionaire?
- Winning Combination
- Winning Lines
- Wisdom of the Crowd
- XYZ

== Reality television ==
- 71 Degrees North
- All Together Now
- Anthea Turner: Perfect Housewife
- Any Dream Will Do
- The Apprentice
- Baby Ballroom: The Championship
- The Baby Borrowers
- Back to Reality
- The Bachelor
- Beauty and the Geek
- Big Brother
- The Biggest Loser
- Britain's Got Talent
- Britain's Missing Top Model
- Britain's Next Top Model
- Celebrity Karaoke Club
- Celebrity Scissorhands
- Cirque de Celebrité
- Coach Trip
- Come Dine with Me
- Dance Dance Dance
- Dancing on Ice
- Dancing on Wheels
- Don't Stop Believing
- Don't Tell the Bride
- Fame Academy
- Farmer Wants a Wife
- The Farm
- The Games
- Girlfri3nds
- Got to Dance
- Grease Is the Word
- The Greatest Dancer
- Hair
- Hell's Kitchen
- Hotter Than My Daughter
- The House of Tiny Tearaways
- How Do You Solve a Problem like Maria?
- Hunted
- I Survived a Zombie Apocalypse
- I'd Do Anything
- I'm a Celebrity...Get Me Out of Here!
- I'm Famous and Frightened!
- The Jump
- Just the Two of Us
- Killer Magic
- Last Man Standing
- Let It Shine
- Let's Sing and Dance
- Lip Sync Battle UK
- Little Angels
- Little Mix: The Search
- Love Island
- The Marriage Ref
- The Masked Dancer
- The Masked Singer
- MasterChef
- The Mole
- Most Haunted
- Must Be the Music
- New Faces
- The One and Only
- Opportunity Knocks
- Over the Rainbow
- Playing It Straight
- Pop Idol
- Popstar to Operastar
- Popstars (see also: Popstars: The Rivals)
- Project Catwalk
- Rise and Fall
- The Secret Millionaire
- Sexy Beasts
- Shipwrecked
- The Singer Takes It All
- Snog Marry Avoid?
- So You Think You Can Dance
- Soapstar Superstar
- South Side Story
- Splash!
- Stars in Their Eyes
- Strictly Come Dancing
- Superstar
- Survivor
- The Taste
- Tool Academy
- The Traitors
- Tumble
- Undercover Princes
- The Villa
- The Voice UK
- The Voice Kids
- When Will I Be Famous?
- The X Factor
- Young Apprentice
- Young, Dumb and Living Off Mum
- Your Face Sounds Familiar

== Other shows ==
- 101 Ways to Leave a Gameshow
- 19 Keys
- 3-2-1
- 4 Square
- 50/50
- Airmageddon
- Amazing Greys
- Bang on the Money
- Beat the Clock
- Beat the Crusher
- Beat the Nation
- Beat the Star
- Beat the Teacher
- The Better Sex
- Big Break
- The Big Spell
- Big Star's Little Star
- Blankety Blank
- Bob's Full House
- Britain's Best Brain
- Britain's Brightest
- Bullseye
- Celebrity Squares
- Cheggers Plays Pop
- Child's Play
- The Colour of Money
- Concentration
- Crackerjack
- Crosswits
- The Cube
- Deal or No Deal
- Defectors
- Dirty Rotten Cheater
- Distraction
- Do You Trust Your Wife?
- Dog Eat Dog
- Dotto
- Double Your Money
- Drive
- Eliminator
- Epic Gameshow
- Every Second Counts
- Everybody's Equal
- Family Fortunes
- Fast Friends
- For Love or Money
- For the Rest of Your Life
- For What It's Worth
- Friends Like These
- Full Swing
- Gambit
- Game of Talents
- Gameshow Marathon
- The Generation Game
- Genius Game
- The Getaway Car
- Get Set Go
- Give Us a Clue
- Golden Balls
- The Golden Shot
- Happy Families
- High Stakes
- Hitman
- Hole in the Wall
- I Can See Your Voice
- Identity
- In the Grid
- The Indoor League
- Keep It in the Family
- Keynotes
- The Krypton Factor
- Masterpiece
- May the Best House Win
- The Movie Game
- Name That Tune
- Newlyweds
- Nothing But the Truth
- Now You See It
- Odd One Out
- Opportunity Knocks
- Password
- People Are Funny
- Pick Me!
- Pictionary
- Play Your Cards Right
- Play Your Hunch
- Press Your Luck
- The Price Is Right
- Prize Island
- Prized Apart
- Punchlines
- Push the Button
- The Pyramid Game
- The Question Jury
- A Question of Pop
- A Question of Sport
- Raise the Roof
- Rank the Prank
- Red or Black?
- Reflex
- Relic: Guardians of the Museum
- Robot Wars
- Runaround
- Runway
- Sale of the Century
- School of Silence
- The Sky's the Limit
- Small Fortune
- Small Talk
- Split Second
- Spot the Tune
- Strike It Lucky
- Supermarket Sweep
- Swashbuckle
- Take a Letter
- Take the Plunge
- Take Your Pick!
- Takeover Bid
- Talk About
- Techno Games
- That Puppet Game Show
- Time Commanders
- Timekeepers
- Total Wipeout
- Traitor
- Turnabout
- Two for the Money
- Ultimate Brain
- We've Got Your Number
- Who Dares Wins
- The Who, What, or Where Game
- The Whole 19 Yards
- Win Beadle's Money
- Win Your Wish List
- Winner Takes All
- Wipeout
- You Bet!
- You're Back in the Room
