= List of programmes broadcast by Challenge =

This is the list of programmes broadcast on the British television channel Challenge.

== Programming ==
=== Current programming made by Challenge ===
Name of show	Originally broadcast	When broadcast by Challenge	Notes
Blockbusters (fourth revival)	2012	2012–16; 2022‍–‍present	Challenge's revival of Central's iconic game show Blockbusters. Hosted by Simon Mayo.

=== Former programming made by Challenge ===
Name of show	Originally broadcast	When broadcast by Challenge	Notes
Bullseye (revival)	2006		Challenge's revival of Central's game show Bullseye. Hosted by Dave Spikey.
The A-Z of 3-2-1	2000		A special one-off programme showing highlights of Yorkshire's classic gameshow. It was used during Challenge TV's 3-2-1 night at Christmas 2000.
Absolute Cobblers	1999	1999–2003	Based on an Australian format.
Auntie's Smalls	2008–2009	2008–2011	A filler with bloopers from the BBC's TV archives.
The Best of Beadle's About	2000–2002	2000–2006	Used as a 10-minute filler in which highlights of sketches from the Beadle's About series were shown.
Beat The Beast	2016	2016–2017	Contestants test their general knowledge against one of the stars of The Chase, Mark 'The Beast' Labbett.
British Academy Video Games Awards	2012–2014		Highlights of the annual awards ceremony honouring the achievements in the gaming industry.
BWC: British Wrestling Round-up	2013–2014		A round-up of various wrestling matches from around the UK. From the makers of Wrestle Talk TV. It was hosted by Dave Bradshaw, but it was first presented by Lisa Carrodus.
Casino! Casino!	2003–2005	2003–2007	Presented by Bob Mercer (series 1) and Martin Kemp (series 2).
Celebrity Addicts	2003	2003–2006	A variation of the Telly Addicts format.
Celebrity Poker Club	2003–2005	2003–2014	A spin-off to Channel 4's popular Late Night Poker series.
Comedy of Errors	2002	2002–2003	Home video clip show presented by Richard Orford.
The Cooler	1998	1998–2003	Late-night gameshow presented by Donna Air and Iain Coyle.
Defectors	2001–2002	2001–2015	Presented by Richard Orford.
Don't Drink the Water	1997	1997–1999	Comedy quiz show based around travel played by two teams of celebrities, hosted by Paul Coia.
Drunken Businessmen	2003	2003–2005	Another Japanese game show, used as a filler. It was last shown on Challenge in 2005 as part of 'Japanese Day'.
Endurance UK	1997–1998	1997–2009	The British version of the cult Japanese show Za Gaman.
Extreme Endurance	2003	2003–2005	Short, 15-minute segments of Za Gaman. It was hosted by Al Convey and featured the voices of Eiji Kusuhara (who was one of the two voiceovers for Banzai) and Ryozo Kohira.
Football Freestyler	2012	2012–2013	Series in which Dan Magness travels around the world to find out which country has the best football tricks and skills. Now on Sky Sports.
Fort Boyard (revival)	2003	2003–2015	Presented by Christopher Ellison and Jodie Penfold.
Fort Boyard Takes on the World	2004	2004–2008	A 10-part series of clips of the different versions of Fort Boyard from around the globe, presented by Tim Vine.
Game Central	2002		A phone-in segment.
Gameplay	1995–1996		A live phone-in segment.
The Games Room	1999–2000		A short-lived replacement for Prize Time.
Gameshow Gold	2006	2006–2009	Series of clips from classic gameshows.
Glory Ball	2005		Another live phone-in segment.
House of Games	2004	2004–2015	Presented by Mike McClean.
Incredible Edible Challenge	2003		A filler programme in which Japanese chefs cook unusual things. It was the last programme to air on the defunct sister channel Ftn.
iPlay	2000–2002		Replacement for The Games Room.
It's Not What You Know	2008	2008–2015	Game show presented by Chris Tarrant, where people can win money by not answering any of the questions correctly.
Karaoke Challenge	1997	1997–2010	Karaoke-themed game show, presented by various hosts, including Ted Robbins.
Kenji's Video Letter Home	2003	2003–2004	Used during the Japanese Christmas Cracker strand in December 2003.
Les Dennis' Home Video Heroes	2008	2008–2011	Home video clip show narrated by Les Dennis and Stuart Hall.
Monkey Business	2003	2003–2004	A 10-minute filler.
Nortonland	2007	2007–2009	Clip show of games played on Graham Norton's Channel 4 show, V Graham Norton.
Poker Den	2005		Presented by Jesse May with commentary by Grub Smith.
Prize Time	1997–1998		Replaced by The Games Room.
The Pyramid Game (second revival)	2007	2007–2014	Challenge's version of the classic Steve Jones game show, presented by Donny Osmond.
Reverse-a-Word	2004		Seven-minute pilot, presented by the BBC Radio 1 DJ Scott Mills.
Roy Walker's Gameshow Moments	2009	2009–2012	Series of clips from gameshows, past and present. Later shown under the title Roy Walker's Guide to Gameshows.
Roy Walker's TV Bloomers	2009	2009–2012	The Catchphrase host's take on the Auntie's Bloomers format.
Sale of the Century (second revival)	1997–1998	1997–2003	Challenge TV's version of Anglia's classic gameshow, it was presented by Keith Chegwin.
Say the Word	1997	1997–2008	Hosted by one of Challenge's original continuity presenters, Andy Crane.
Showbiz Blackjack	2006		Presented by Matt Brown.
Showbiz Darts	2006	2006–2015	Celebrity darts contest.
Showbiz Poker	2006		Presented by Lisa Rogers.
Soap Addicts	2002–2003	2002–2006	Another variation of the Telly Addicts format.
Split Second	1997–1998	1997–1999	Hosted by Aonghus McAnally.
Sport Addicts	2002	2002–2004	Yet, another variation of the Telly Addicts format. Presented by Bradley Walsh.
Stake Out	2001	2001–2020	Presented by Anthony Davis.
Sushi TV	2003–2004	2003–2005	Series of clips from various Japanese gameshows, presented by Julian Clary (series 1) and narrated by Craig Charles (series 2).
Take it or Leave it?	2006–2008	2006–2012	The trivia quiz show in which teams of two must hold their nerve to win the £50,000 prize. Presented by Richard Arnold.
That's the Question!	2007		The UK version of the American gameshow, it was presented by Sarah Cawood.
Timeline	2014	2014–2015	Presented by Brian Conley.
TNA: British Boot Camp	2013–2014	2013–2016	
TNA Unfinished Business	2012	2012–2016	
Totally Top Trumps	2004		Short-lived game show, loosely based on the famous card game, presented by Andy Goldstein; only lasted 20 episodes.
TV Scrabble	2001–2003	2001–2012	Televised version of the famous board game.
TV's Greatest Game Shows	2019		A celebration of classic British game shows. Presented by Roy Walker.
UK's Strongest Man	2011–2013	2011–2014	Coverage of the annual strongmen tournament.
Ultimate Guinness World Records	2004	2004–2009	Introduced by Jamie Rickers.
Vegas Virgins	2005	2005–2014	Reality series following 10 British and American casino hopefuls.
Winner Takes All! (revival)	1997	1997–2002	Challenge TV's version of Yorkshire's gameshow, presented by Bobby Davro.
Wrestle Talk TV	2012–2015		Wrestling magazine show, which aired on Sunday nights straight after TNA.
World's Greatest Gambling Scams	2006	2006–2013	A 10-part series that looked at the cons that left the gambling industry reeling.
You Can't Beat a Bit of Bully!	2015		A documentary celebrating Central’s classic game show Bullseye.

=== Current programming originally shown by other broadcasters ===
Name of show	Original channel(s)	Originally broadcast	When re-runs began airing on Challenge
5 Gold Rings	ITV	2017–2020	2022
All Star Family Fortunes	ITV	2006–2015	2019
Antiques Road Trip	BBC One/BBC Two	2009-present	2026
Bargain Hunt	BBC One	2000–present	2023
Beat the Chasers	ITV	2020-present	2026
The Biggest Game in Town	ITV	2001	2026
The Bidding Room	BBC One	2020–present	2025
Blankety Blank (original)	BBC One/ITV	1979–2002, 2016, 2020–present	2000
Blockbusters (original)	ITV/Sky One	1983–1995	1997–2016; 2023
Bob's Full House	BBC One	1984–1990	2012; 2024
Bridge of Lies	BBC One	2022–present	2023
Bruce Forsyth's Generation Game	BBC One	1990–1994	2024
Bruce's Price is Right	ITV	1995–2001	2002
Bullseye (original)	ITV	1981–1995	2002
Cash in the Attic	BBC One/Channel 5	2002–2022	2023
Cash Trapped	ITV	2016-2019	2022
Catchphrase (original and revival)	ITV	1986–2002, 2013–present	1997; 2023 (Note: Catchphrase did not air on Challenge between 18 March and 6 August 2023. Before the hiatus, series 10, 11, 16 and 17 were also broadcast.)
The Chase	ITV	2009–present	2014
Classic Who Wants to Be a Millionaire? (original)	ITV	1998–2014, 2018–present	2004
The Cube	ITV	2009–2015, 2020–2021	2017
The Crystal Maze	Channel 4/E4	1990-1995, 2016-2020	1998-2020; 2023
Dale's Supermarket Sweep (original)	ITV	1993–2001, 2007	2005
Dickinson's Real Deal	ITV	2006–2024	2022
Family Fortunes (original, except Series 1, 2, 3, 4 & 22)	ITV	1980–2002, 2020–present	1997
Friends Like These	BBC One	1999–2003	2005-2014, 2025–present
Gladiators (original)	ITV	1992–2000	1999–2019, 2026
Gladiators (1st revival)	Sky One	2008–2009	2011–2013, 2026
Gladiators (2nd revival)	BBC One	2024-present	2026
House of Games	BBC Two	2017–present	2025
In for a Penny	ITV	2019–2024	2024
Joe Pasquale's Price Is Right	ITV	2006–2007	2009
Pick a Number	ITV	1984–1996	2026
Play Your Cards Right	ITV	1980–1987, 1994–1999, 2002–2003	2002
Pointless	BBC Two/BBC One	2009–present	2011
Scrapheap Challenge	Channel 4	1998–2010	2022
Sign2Win	BSL Zone	2022	2023
Strike it Lucky!	ITV	1986–1994	1998
Tenable	ITV	2016–2024	2021
The Weakest Link (original)	BBC Two/BBC One	2000–2012; 2017; 2021–present	2007; 2023
The Wheel	BBC One	2020–present	2026
Through the Keyhole (original)	ITV/Sky One/BBC One/BBC Two	1987–2008, 2013–2019	1993; 1997; 2023–present
Total Wipeout UK	BBC One	2009–2012	2013–2016, 2025
Wheel of Fortune (original)	ITV	1988–2001	2002
Winner Takes All! (original)	ITV	1975–1988	2002; 2026

=== Former programming originally shown by other broadcasters ===
Name of show	Original channel(s)	Originally broadcast	When re-runs aired on Challenge
100%	Channel 5	1997–2001	1998–2006
1 vs. 100	BBC One	2006–2009	2008–2015
3-2-1	ITV	1978–1988	1997–2015
60 Minute Makeover	ITV	2004–2014, 2018	2009
The $64,000 Question	ITV	1990–1993	1997–1999
8 Out of 10 Cats	Channel 4/More4/E4	2005–2021	2007–2016
The Adventure Game	BBC Two	1980–1986	2002–2004
All Clued Up	ITV	1988–1991	1998–2000
The All-New Mr. and Mrs. Show	UK Living	1995–1996	1998–2001
The Amazing Race	CBS (USA)	2001–present	2007–2010
The Angel	Sky One	2012	2013–2015
American Ninja Warrior	G4/NBC (USA)	2009–present	2013–2019
Auntie's Bloomers	BBC One	1991–2001	2009–2011
Australian Ninja Warrior	Nine Network (Australia)	2017–2022	2018–2019
Back in the Day	Channel 4	2005	2009–2012
Baggage	GSN (USA)	2010–2015	2013
Ballbreakers	GSN (USA)	2005–2006	2007
Banzai	E4	2001–2003	2006–2009
Bargain Hunters	HTV West	2002–2004	2002–2005
Battle Dome	Syndication (USA)	1999–2001	2002–2003
Beadle's About	ITV	1986–1996	1999–2007
Better Gardens	ITV	2000	2005
Better Homes	ITV	1999–2003	2004–2006
Big Break	BBC One	1991–2002	2006–2013
The Biggest Loser	Living/ITV	2005–2006, 2009–2012	2009
Bill Bailey's Birdwatching Bonanza	Sky One	2010	2012–2014
Bite Size Brainiac	Sky One	2007	2011
Blind Date	ITV/Channel 5	1985–2003, 2017–2019	2006
The Blurb	Ginx TV	2011–2014	
Boot Sale Challenge	ITV	1998–2004	2002–2005
Brainiac: Science Abuse	Sky One	2003–2008	2012–2014
Brainiac's Test Tube Baby	Sky One	2006–2007	2012–2014
Brainstorm	BBC One	1988	1999–2000
Bring Me the Head of Light Entertainment	Channel 5	1997–2000	1998–2004
Britain's Hardest	Sky 1	2004	2012–2015
Britain's Worst Celebrity Driver	Channel 5	2003–2005	2008–2009
Britain's Worst Driver	Channel 5	2002 & 2003	2008–2009
Busman's Holiday	ITV	1985–1993	1997–1999
Candid Camera	ITV	1960–1968	1999–2001
Can't Cook, Won't Cook	BBC One	1995–2000	2008–2010
Carnal Knowledge	ITV	1996–1997	1998–2003
Cash Cab	ITV	2005–2006	2007–2009
Celebrity Blackjack	GSN (USA)	2004–2005	2005–2006
Celebrity Poker Showdown	Bravo (USA)	2003–2006	2004–2005
Celebrity Ready Steady Cook	BBC One	1997–2003	2008–2010
Celebrity Squares	ITV	1975–1979, 1993–1997, 2014–2015	2000–2015
Chain Letters	ITV	1987–1997	2009–2012
The Chase USA	GSN (USA)	2013-2015, 2021–2023	2014-2019
Cleverdicks	Sky Atlantic	2012	2012–2015
Cluedo	ITV	1990–1993	1998–1999
Concentration	ITV	1959–1990	1997–1998
Countdown	Channel 4	1982–present	2015–2016
Crackerjack	BBC Television Service/BBC One/CBBC	1955–1984, 2020-2021	2002–2003
Crash Test Dummies	Sky One	2007	2013
Crosswits	ITV	1985–1998	1997–2000
Cruel Summer	Trouble	2001–2003	2009–2010
The Desert Forges	Channel 5	2001	2002–2006
The Devil's Dinner Party	Sky Atlantic	2011–2012	2012–2015
Dirty Money	Sky One	2002	2012–2015
Distraction UK	Channel 4	2003–2004	2007–2015
Distraction USA	Comedy Central (USA)	2005–2006	2007–2011
Deal or No Deal?	Channel 4/ITV	2005–2016, 2023–present	2011-2022
Dog Eat Dog	BBC One	2001–2002	2004–2008
Don't Forget the Lyrics! UK	Sky One	2008–2009	2011–2018
Don't Forget the Lyrics! USA	Fox (USA)	2007–2009	2012
Don't Sit in the Front Row!	Sky Atlantic/Sky One	2012–2013	2015
Don't Stop Me Now!	Sky One	2012	2013–2015
Don't Try This at Home!	ITV	1998–2001	2003–2008
Dr. Vegas	CBS (USA)	2004	2005
Duck Quacks Don't Echo!	Sky 1	2014–2017	2014–2015
Eggheads	BBC One/BBC Two/Channel 5	2003–2023	2006-2014; 2018-2020
Extreme Dodgeball	GSN (USA)	2004–2005	2005–2008
Family Feud	Syndicated	1976–present	2016
Fear Factor Australia	Nine Network (Australia)	2002	2010
Fear Factor South Africa	M-Net (South Africa)	2007	2008
Fear Factor UK	Sky One	2002–2004	2006–2009
Fear Factor USA	NBC (USA)	2001–2006, 2011–2012	2006–2009
Fifteen to One	Channel 4	1988–2003, 2013–2019	1998–2018
Finders Keepers	CITV	1991–1996, 2006	2014–2016
Fort Boyard (original)	Channel 5	1998–2001	2002–2006, 2014–2015
Full Metal Jousting	History (USA)	2012	2013–2015
Fun House	CITV	1989–1999	2009–2016
Gadget Geeks	Sky One	2012	2013–2015
Gagsters	The WB (USA)	2002–2004	2009–2012
GameFace	Ginx TV	2009–2011	2011
GamesMaster	Channel 4	1992–1998, 2021	2003–2004
Ginx Files	Ginx TV	2009–2011	2011
Give us a Clue	ITV/BBC One	1979–1991	1997–2000
Gladiators 2000	Syndication (USA)	1994–1996	1999
Gladiators G-Zone	Sky 1	2008	2011–2013
Global E-Missions	Carlton	2001	2002–2003
Going for Gold	BBC One/Channel 5	1987–2009	2002–2015
Going Straight	TV3 (NZ)	2003	2004–2007
Golden Balls	ITV	2007-2009	2009-2020
The Golden Shot	ITV	1967-1975	2002–2006
Got to Dance	Sky 1	2009–2014	2013–2015
Guinness World Records Primetime	Fox (USA)	1998–2001	2003–2004
Guinness World Records Smashed!	Sky One	2008–2009	2011–2013
Guinness World Records UK	ITV	1999–2000	2004–2006
The Heat is On!	UK Living	1997	1998–2003
Hole in the Wall	BBC One	2008–2009	2016–2019
Hot Property	Channel 5	1997–2003	1999–2005
I Dare You!	UPN (USA)	2000	2004–2007
Ice Warriors	ITV	1998	2002–2004
I'm a Celebrity... Get Me out of Here! USA	ABC/NBC (USA)	2003, 2009	2003–2004
Impact Wrestling	Spike/Destination America/Pop (USA)	2004–present	2011–2016
!mpossible	BBC One	2017-2021	2019-2020
In it to Win it	BBC One	2002–2016	2009–2014
Interceptor	ITV	1989–1990	2001–2015
International King of Sports	Channel 5	2002–2004	2004–2006
Iron Chef	Fuji TV (Japan)	1993–1999	2003–2004
It's a Knockout!	BBC One/Channel 5	1966–1988, 1999–2001	1993–2006
It's Anybody's Guess!	Carlton	2000	2001–2002
Kenny vs. Spenny	CBC/Showcase (Canada)	2003–2010	2004–2005
Killer Karaoke	truTV (USA)	2012–2014	2013–2015
King of the Castle	Carlton	2001	2001–2002
Knightmare	CITV	1987–1994	2002–2015
The Krypton Factor	ITV	1977–1995, 2009–2010	1999–2014
Larry Grayson's Generation Game	BBC One	1978–1982	2002–2008
A League of Their Own	Sky 1	2010–2025	2012–2015
The Link	BBC One	2014–2015	2016
London's Hottest Properties	ITV	2003–2004	2004–2005
Love at First Sight	Sky One	1992	1997–1999
Manswers	Spike (USA)	2007–2011	2013
Mastermind	BBC One/BBC Two	1972–present	2007
Merv Griffin's Crosswords	Syndication (USA)	2007–2008	2008
Millionaire Hot Seat	Nine Network/10 (Australia)	2009–2023, 2026-present	2015
The Million Pound Drop	Channel 4	2010–2015	2015–2018
The Mole USA	ABC/Netflix (USA)	2001–2008, 2022-2024	2003–2004
The Moment of Truth	ITV	1998–2001	2003–2009
Move on up!	Channel 5	1997	1997–2000
Murder in Small Town X	Fox (USA)	2001	2003–2004
Most Extreme Elimination Challenge	Spike (USA)	2003–2007	2005–2013
My Kitchen Rules	Seven (Australia)	2010–present	2019
Mystic Challenge	Living	2000	2001–2003
Name That Tune	ITV/Channel 5	1976–1988, 1997–1998	1998–2003
New Faces	ITV	1973–1988	2002–2006
Night Fever	Channel 5	1997–2002	2003–2004
Ninja Warrior	Tokyo Broadcasting System	1997–present	2007-2020
Noel's Are You Smarter Than a 10 Year Old?	Sky One	2007–2010	2011–2018
Nothing but the Truth	Sky 1	2007–2008	2012
Oblivious	Spike (USA)	2002–2004	2004–2006
One Hundred and Eighty	Sky One	2015	2020
Oops! TV	Sky 1	2009–2010	2011–2013
Opportunity Knocks	ITV	1956–1978	2002–2003
The Other Half	BBC One	1997–2002	2003
Outdoor Outtakes	OLN (USA)	2003	2004–2005
Password	ITV/BBC Two/BBC One/Channel 4	1963–1988	1999
The People Versus	ITV	2000–2002	2007–2010
Perfect Match	Channel 4	2001–2003	2006
Pet Star	Animal Planet (USA)	2002–2005	2006
Planet of the Apps	Ginx TV	2011–2015	2013
Postcode Challenge	STV	2007–2011	2009–2010
The Pyramid Game (first revival)	ITV	1981–1990	1997–1998
Quiz Nights	Sky 1	2015	2015
The Race	Sky 1	2006	2013–2015
Race to Dakar	Sky 2	2006	2013–2015
Raspberry Tart	ITV	2000–2001	2001–2003
Red Handed	ITV	1998	2004
Robotica	TLC (USA)	2001–2002	2003–2004
Robot Wars	BBC Two/BBC Choice/Channel 5	1998–2004, 2016–2018	2007-2018
RollerJam	Spike (USA)	1999–2001	2006–2008
Room 101	BBC Two/BBC One	1994–2007, 2012–2018	2009–2011
Safebreakers	Sky 1	2011	2012–2015
Sale of the Century	ITV	1971–1983	2000–2005
Screen Test	BBC1	1970–1984	1999
Sell Me the Answer	Sky 1	2009–2010	2011–2013
Shooting Stars	BBC Two/BBC Choice	1995–2011	2008–2013
Showboaters	Sky 1	2011	2012–2015
Sky Poker School	Sky Poker	2011	2011
Small Talk	BBC One	1994-1996	2008-2019
So You Think You Can Dance?	Fox (USA)	2005–2024	2006
Spellbound	Sky 1	1994–1996	1997–1998
Spelling Bee	ESPN (USA)	2004	2005–2006
Stars in Their Eyes	ITV	1990–2006, 2015, 2022–2023	1999–2016
Sticky Moments	Channel 4	1989–1990	1998–1999
Studs	Syndication (USA)	1991–1993	1997–1999
Style Court	The Style Network (USA)	2003–2004	2006
Surprise Chefs	ITV	1994–2001	2001–2002
Survivor	CBS (USA)	2000–present	2003–2004
SWAG	Channel 5	2002–2004	2004–2006
Take a Letter	UK Living	1997	1999–2002
Takeshi's Castle	Tokyo Broadcasting System/Prime Video	1986-1989, 2023	2002-2018
Takeover Bid	BBC One	1990–1991	1998–1999
Take Your Pick	ITV	1955-1968, 1992-1999	2008-2021
Telly Addicts	BBC One	1985–1998	2000–2003
The Chase Australia	Seven Network (Australia)	2015–present	2016–2019
TNA Xplosion	Syndication (USA)	2002–present	2011–2016
Top 100 Video Games of All Time	G4 (USA)	2012	2013–2015
Total Wipeout USA	ABC (USA)	2008–2014	2013–2016
Treasure Hunt	Channel 4/BBC Two	1982–1989, 2002–2003	1993–2015
Trivial Pursuit	The Family Channel	1993–1994	1997–2009, 2013–2016
TV Bloopers	ABC (USA)	1998–2004	1999–2005
UK's Strongest Man	Bravo	2009–2010	2012
Unbeatable Banzuke	TBS (Japan)	1995–2002	2008–2012
Under Offer	Meridian/HTV West	1998–2001	2001–2004
Under Pressure	Channel 5	2001	2001–2002
Videogame Nation	Ginx TV	2014–2016	2014–2016
Video Surf	Pick	2013	2013–2015
Wall of Fame	Sky 1	2011	2012–2015
We are the Champions!	BBC One	1973–1995	2002–2006
The Weakest Link USA	NBC/Syndication/Fox (USA)	2001–2003, 2020-2024, 2025-present	2005–2007
What's My Line?	BBC Television Service/BBC Two/ITV/BBC Four	1953–2005	2002–2003
Whittle	Channel 5	1997–1998	1997–2015
Who Dares Wins	Seven Network (Australia)	1996–1998	2002–2004
Who Dares Wins	BBC One	2007–2019	2018–2019
Who's Sorry Now?	UK Living	1995–1996	1998–2001
Whose Line is it Anyway? USA	ABC/ABC FamilyThe CW (USA)	1998–2004, 2005-2007, 2013-2024	2005–2006
Wild Things	Sky 1	2015–2017	2015–2018
Win, Lose or Draw	ITV	1990–1998	2007–2008
Win, Lose or Draw Late	ITV	2004	2012–2014
Win My Wage	Channel 4	2007	2009–2010
Winning Lines	BBC One	1999–2004	2010–2012
Wipeout	BBC One	1994–2003	2008–2016
Without Prejudice?	Channel 4	2003–2004	2004–2005
World's Strongest Man	Bravo/Channel 5	2009–present	2011–2013
You Bet!	ITV	1988–1997, 2024-2025	2002–2011
Your Face or Mine?	E4	2002–2003	2008–2011

=== Former programming shown on The Family Channel ===
Name of show	Original channel(s)	Originally broadcast	When broadcast by The Family Channel
The Brady Bunch	ABC (USA)	1969–1974	1994–1997
The Adventures of Tintin	HBO (USA)	1991–1992	1994–1997
Art Attack	CITV	1990–2007	1996–1997
Batman	ABC (USA)	1966–1968	1993–1996
Blockbusters	ITV	1983–1993	1993–1997
Catchphrase	ITV	1986–2002, 2013–present	1993–1997
Danger Mouse (original series)	CITV	1981–1992	1995–1996
The Fall Guy	ABC (USA)	1981–1986	1993
Family Catchphrase	The Family Channel	1993–1994	1993–1997
Home to Roost	ITV	1985–1990	1994–1997
It's a Knockout! (Welsh version)	S4C	1991–1994	1993–1994
Lou Grant	CBS (USA)	1972–1982	1993
Motormouth	CITV	1988–1992	1994–1998
My Two Dads	NBC (USA)	1987–1990	1993–1997
Once a Hero	ABC (USA)	1987	1993–1996
Phyllis	CBS (USA)	1975–1977	1994
The Pyramid Game	ITV	1981–1990	1993–1997
Rags to Riches	NBC (USA)	1986–1987	1994–1996
Remington Steele	NBC (USA)	1982–1987	1993
Road to Avonlea	CBC (Canada)	1990–1996	1994–1997
Roll with it!	The Family Channel	1995	1995–1997
Second Guess	The Family Channel	1993–1994	1993–1997
Through the Keyhole	ITV/Sky 1/BBC One/BBC Two	1987–2008, 2013–2019	1993–1997
Treasure Hunt	Channel 4/BBC Two	1982–1989, 2002–2003	1993–1997
Trivial Pursuit	The Family Channel	1993–1994	1993–1997
Teen Win, Lose or Draw	ITV	1993	1996–1997
The Wonder Years	ABC (USA)	1988–1993	1993
A Word in Your Ear	The Family Channel	1995	1995–1997
Zorro	The Family Channel (USA)	1990–1993	1993–1997
