= Cognito =

Cognito may refer to:

== Technology ==
- Amazon Cognito, a user identity service by Amazon Web Services (AWS)
- Cognito, an identity verification and compliance platform owned by Plaid Inc.
- Cognito, a cybersecurity platform owned by Vectra AI

== People ==
- Ian Cognito, a British stand-up comedian
- Cognito, a hip hop documentarian who documented the making of The Ecstatic
- Cognito, a rapper formerly associated with record label Strange Music

== Other uses ==
- Cognito, a video game label owned by Eutechnyx
- Cognito, Inc., a fictional organization in the TV series Inside Job

== See also ==
- Livein Cognito, an album by saxophonist Tim Berne's Big Satan
- The Great Cognito, a claymation short film
- Cogito (disambiguation)
- Incognito (disambiguation)
