= Incognito =

Incognito is an English adjective meaning "in disguise", "having taken steps to conceal one's identity".

Incognito may also refer to:

== Film and television ==
=== Film ===
- Incognito, a 1915 film featuring Rae Berger
- Incognito (1937 film), a Danish family film
- Incognito (1997 film), an American crime thriller
- Incognito (2009 film), a French comedy

=== Television ===
- Incognito (game show), a 1995–1997 British quiz show
- Incognito (TV series), a Filipino action drama series
- Incognito, a 2004 Mexican TV show hosted by Facundo Gomez
- "Incognito" (Beavis and Butt-Head), a 1993 episode
- Incognito, a character in the anime Hellsing
- Ms. Incognito, a South Korean crime drama series

== Music ==
- Incognito (band), a British acid jazz band
- Incognito (Celine Dion album), 1987
- Incognito (Amanda Lear album), 1981
- Incognito (Spyro Gyra album), 1982
- Incognito, an album by No Use for a Name, 1990
- "Incognito" (song), by Celine Dion, 1987
- "Incognito", a song by the Judybats from Native Son, 1991
- "Incognito", a song by Justice from Hyperdrama, 2024

== Literature ==
- Incognito (comics), a comic-book published by Marvel
- Incognito: The Secret Lives of the Brain, a book by neuroscientist David Eagleman
- Incognito, a novel by Petru Dumitriu
- Incognito, a novel by Cinzia Giorgio

== Other uses ==
- Incognito mode, a feature of the Google Chrome browser
- Incognito, alias of professional wrestler Jose Jorge Arriaga Rodriguez (Sin Cara) (born 1977)
- Incognito Entertainment, American video game company

== See also ==
- Terra incognita, a term in cartography
- Richie Incognito (b. 1983), American football player
- Ian Cognito (1958–2019), English stand-up comedian
