= Cogito =

Cogito may refer to:

- Cogito ergo sum, philosophical proposition (English: "I think, therefore I am")
- Cogito (magazine), a philosophical magazine
- Cogito (software), a frontend to the git revision control software
