= British comedy =

In film, television, theatre, and radio, British comedy has produced some of the most renowned characters in the world. In it, satire is one of the features of British humour. Radio comedy in Britain has been almost exclusively hosted on the BBC.

== History ==
"[Pulcinella] went down particularly well with Restoration British audiences, fun-starved after years of Puritanism. We soon changed Punch's name, transformed him from a marionette to a hand puppet, and he became, really, a spirit of Britain - a subversive maverick who defies authority, a kind of puppet equivalent to our political cartoons."

— Punch and Judy showman Glyn Edwards

British comedy history is measured in centuries.Niçholas Udall wrote his first English comedy, 'Ralph Roister Doister' in 1553 which was based on the model of Plautus and Terence.It is regarded as the first comedy to be written in English language. Shakespeare incorporated many chase scenes and beatings into his comedies, such as in his play The Comedy of Errors. Punch and Judy made their first recorded appearance in Britain in 1662, when Samuel Pepys noted a "pretty" puppet play being performed in Covent Garden, London. The various episodes of Punch and Judy are dominated by the anarchic clowning of Mr. Punch.

Satire has been a major feature of comedy in the British Isles for centuries. The pictorial satire of William Hogarth was a precursor to the development of political cartoons in 18th-century Britain The medium developed under the direction of James Gillray from London, who has been referred to as the father of the political cartoon.

In early 19th-century Britain, pantomime acquired its present form, which includes slapstick comedy and featured the first mainstream clown, Joseph Grimaldi, while comedy routines also featured heavily in British music hall theatre which became popular in the 1850s. British comedians who honed their skills at pantomime and music hall sketches include Charlie Chaplin, Stan Laurel, George Formby, and Dan Leno. The music hall comedian and theatre impresario Fred Karno developed a form of sketch comedy without dialogue in the 1890s, and Chaplin and Laurel were among the young comedians who worked for him as part of "Fred Karno's Army".

== Radio ==
Radio comedy in Britain has been almost exclusively the preserve of the BBC. In the 1940s and 1950s, variety dominated the schedules, and popular series included It's That Man Again and Much Binding in the Marsh. In the 1950s, the BBC was running Hancock's Half Hour starring Tony Hancock. Hancock's Half Hour was later transferred to television.

One of the notable radio shows was the double entendre-laden Round the Horne (1965–1968), a sequel to the earlier series Beyond Our Ken, which ran from 1959 to 1964.

Later radio shows made use of the panel game format, including the long-running Just a Minute (1967–), I'm Sorry I Haven't a Clue (1972–), and The News Quiz (1977–), which often broadcast a dozen of so episodes a year.

Topical shows include The Mary Whitehouse Experience and The Now Show

== Television ==
Following the success of Hancock's Half Hour and Steptoe and Son, sitcoms became a part of some television schedules. The BBC has generally been dominant in television comedy, but the commercial stations have also had some successes. Other formats have also been popular, such as with sketch shows, stand-up comedy, impressionists, and puppet shows.

Notable satirical comedies are the 1960s series That Was The Week That Was, the 1980s series Not the Nine O'Clock News, and ITV's puppet show Spitting Image. The show of the 1980s and early 1990s, Spitting Image, was a satire of politics, entertainment, sport, and British culture of the era, and at its peak, it was watched by 15 million people. British satire has also gone over into quiz shows; popular examples include the news quiz Have I Got News for You, 8 out of 10 cats, and Shooting Stars.

In the 1980s, alternative comedy was spearheaded by Ben Elton and The Comic Strip group, which included Alexei Sayle, Rik Mayall, and French and Saunders. The 1990s and 2000s also have those that have used editing, surreal humour, and cultural references to great effect.

== See also ==
- British Comedy Guide
- List of British comedians
- British Comedy Awards
- British humour
- British sitcom
- List of U.K. game shows
- List of BBC sitcoms
