= The Marriage Ref =

The Marriage Ref may refer to:

- The Marriage Ref (American TV series)
- The Marriage Ref (British TV series)
