= Ellis Ashton =

English comedian and theatre historian

Ellis Ashton (born 1 December 1919 – 31 October 1985), MBE, was an English comedian and theatre historian.

== Biography ==
Ellis Ashton was born on 1 December 1919 in Liverpool, northwest England. His parents were Joseph and Beatrice Ashton. He was educated at Holy Trinity of Liverpool and at the Army Formation College. Ashton married Margaret Mitchell. He died in London on 31 October 1985, aged 65. (Obituary in The Times, 8 November 1985).

== Affiliations ==
Ellis Ashton served as the Chairman of the British Music Hall Society. Ashton was a founding member of the Theatres Trust and the British Theatre Institute. He served as a president of the National Association of Theatrical Television and Kine Employees. Ashton was the Governor of Ruskin College and Vice President of the Ruskin Fellowship. He was also a Fellow of the Royal Society of Arts, the Linnean Society of London, the Zoological Society of London, and the Royal Geographical Society.
