= Shine TV =

British media production company

- Type: Subsidiary
- Industry: Television
- Founded: March 2001; 25 years ago
- Founder: Elisabeth Murdoch
- Headquarters: London, United Kingdom
- Key people: Leon Wilson (CEO); Jack Kennedy (Creative Director); Matt Bennett (Director of Programmes)
- Parent: Shine Group (2006–2015); Endemol Shine Group (2015–2018); Banijay UK Productions (2018–present)
- Website: shine.tv

Shine TV is a British media production company and part of Banijay Entertainment with offices in London and Manchester.

Shine was founded in March 2001 by Elisabeth Murdoch, daughter of News Corporation CEO Rupert Murdoch. The company was 80% owned by Elisabeth Murdoch, 15% by Lord Alli, and 5% by BSkyB, which signed a deal guaranteeing to buy an agreed amount of Shine programming for two years.

== Programming ==
- 100 Greatest Sexy Moments - a three-hour documentary countdown broadcast on Channel Four that explored the "turn-ons" of the average Briton
- As Seen On TV - the TV-themed panel quiz show on BBC One presented by Steve Jones
- Battle of the Brains - the team played game show on BBC Two presented by Paddy O'Connell
- The Biggest Loser - reality weight loss show on ITV1 presented by Kate Garraway in 2009 (daytime edition) and Davina McCall in 2011 (primetime edition)
- Charles & Camilla: Madly In Love - documentary broadcast on Sky One tracing the path of the relationship between the Prince of Wales and the Duchess of Cornwall from their first meeting to their marriage in 2005
- Gladiators - the 2008–2009 revival of the game show on Sky One
- Got to Dance - dance reality series that premiered on Sky One in January 2010
- Masterchef Goes Large - Celebrity Masterchef - revived version of the cookery show, starring Gregg Wallace and John Torode; the latest in the Masterchef format is Masterchef: The Professionals, with judges Gregg Wallace and Michel Roux
- The Unofficial World Records of Sex (UWROS) - x-rated comedy broadcast on Sky One that explores record-breaking feats of a biological nature
- The What in the World? Quiz - scientific panel game hosted by Marcus Brigstocke for Five
- Hunted - Channel 4 reality show where a group of everyday civilians are willingly sent on the run from a team known as hunters, for 28 days
- The Heist - Sky One reality competition where a group of everyday citizens commit a robbery and hide from a team of police detectives.

Under Shine Drama:

- Hex - 2004 teen supernatural drama series
- Sugar Rush - 2005 teen comedy series
- Merlin - 2008 family supernatural drama series based on the legend of the wizard Merlin
- Demons - 2009 teen supernatural drama series
