= The $1,000,000 Chance of a Lifetime =

American game show

- Genre: Game show
- Created by: The El Encanto Group
- Directed by: Jerome Shaw; Joe Carolei
- Presented by: Jim Lange
- Announcer: Mark Summers (1986); Johnny Gilbert (1986–1987)
- Country of origin: United States
- No. of seasons: 2

Production
- Executive producers: Bob Synes; Scott A. Stone; Jay Feldman
- Producer: Joel Stein
- Production locations: Hollywood Center Studios; Hollywood, California
- Running time: approx. 22–26 minutes
- Production companies: XPTLA Company; Lorimar-Telepictures

Original release
- Network: Syndicated (daily)
- Release: January 6, 1986 – May 22, 1987

Related
- All Clued Up (British version)

The $1,000,000 Chance of a Lifetime is an American game show which offered a $1 million (annuitized) grand prize to winning contestants. The show aired in syndication from January 6, 1986, until May 22, 1987. The show was hosted by Jim Lange, and he was joined by Karen Thomas as co-host during the second season. Mark Summers was the show's announcer for the first few weeks and Johnny Gilbert announced the remainder of the series. The show was produced by XPTLA, Inc., and distributed by Lorimar-Telepictures.

== Gameplay ==
Two couples competed each day, one of which was usually a returning champion. The two couples tried to win money by solving hangman-style word puzzles, but only one member of each couple played at any given time.

In order to fill-in the blank spaces in the puzzle, a series of toss-up clues were played. The clues were usually one word in length, but certain clues called for two or even three words to be used. The contestants were told how many letters were in the clue and the letters were put into the clue one at a time until one of the contestants buzzed in. If that contestant gave a correct answer, the couple scored $25. If not, the clue would be filled in up to the last letter and the opposing contestant got the chance to guess.

Once a contestant guessed correctly, he/she stepped up to an oversized keyboard to place letters in the puzzle, which was displayed on a giant computer screen. All of the letters appearing in the puzzle, as well as a star that would represent numbers or punctuation marks, were lit on the keyboard. There was always an additional key lit that represented what did not appear in the puzzle; the decoy key was referred to as "The Stinger". Correctly guessing the clues earned the contestants the choice of two keys on the keyboard, and each time what was chosen appeared in the puzzle $25 was added to a bank that went to the couple who solved the puzzle. Finding the Stinger ended a contestant's turn immediately; the contestant had to avoid it on both key choices in order to be able to guess the puzzle. A new clue was played whenever a contestant either failed to guess the puzzle or found the Stinger.

In the second round, the couples switched positions and the values for each word and correctly placed letter doubled to $50. For the third round, as well as any subsequent rounds, the values rose to $100 and each couple chose which one of them would play. The game continued as long as time permitted. If time ran short during a puzzle, each of the remaining letters was put into the puzzle one at a time and the bank continued to accumulate until one of the couples answered correctly.

The couple in the lead at the end of the game won their bank and played the bonus round. If there was a tie after the final puzzle, a final toss-up clue was played with sudden death rules; a correct answer won the game, but an incorrect answer resulted in an automatic loss.

Losing couples received consolation prizes, including a copy of the show's home game.

=== Bonus round ===
A couple playing the bonus round during the second season.

In the bonus round the couple had to solve six words or phrases within 60 seconds. Before the round they were presented with three categories to choose from. Once they made the selection the show's on-stage security guard led them into an isolation booth which was wired so they could only hear Lange—but not the audience—and could only see the game board screen.

The round began on Lange's command and one letter at a time was placed in the word or phrase. Letters were revealed at a rate of approximately one per 1.5 seconds, continuing until every blank except one had been filled. The couple could not pass and had to keep guessing at each word until they either solved it or ran out of time.

If the couple successfully completed the bonus round in their first attempt, they were offered $5,000 and a choice to retire as undefeated champions or to return the next day and face another couple on the following show. If the couple chose to return and then completed the bonus round a second time, the offer increased to $10,000.

If the couple advanced to the bonus round for a third day, they played for the top prize of $1,000,000. In the first season, the grand prize was all cash paid as a 25-year annuity. For the second season, the top prize was a $900,000 annuity and $100,000 in prizes, including a pair of automobiles and 20 round-trip tickets on Delta Air Lines valid for any destination in the continental United States.

If at any time the couple failed to win the bonus round, they were retired as champions and left with whatever they had won in the main game to that point.

During its two-season run, a total of nine couples won the grand prize.

== Merchandise ==
A single board game based on the show was released by Cardinal in 1986.

== International versions ==
Country	Local name	Host	Channel	Year aired
Brazil	Domingo Milionário	J. Silvestre	Rede Manchete	1997–1999
Colombia	El Programa del Millón	Fernando González Pacheco	Cadena Dos	1987–1990
United Kingdom	All Clued Up	David Hamilton	ITV	1988–1991
