= Lew Lane (entertainer) =

Lew Lane (born Stanley Lawton; 9 April 1928 – 15 November 2015) was an English variety show entertainer, director and producer.

Born in Dudley, Worcestershire, he left school at the age of 14 and performed as a ventriloquist, adopting the stage name Lew Lane after his signature was misread. He formed a double act with Al French, and performed in local shows in the Midlands. During military service in the Second World War he performed with ENSA, and compered and staged shows, later working with Ralph Reader.

In the 1950s, he started presenting night club and cabaret shows in London. He became a leading producer and promoter of shows in such venues as the 21 Club in Mayfair, and Churchill's in Bond Street, often featuring lavish productions and floor shows. After the clubs became less fashionable in the 1970s and 1980s, he continued as a freelance producer of shows featuring variety acts and music hall performers. He was actively involved in the Royal Variety Charity and the Grand Order of Water Rats, and was President of the British Music Hall Society in 1980-1983.

He married Pearl Squires in 1956; they had one child. He died in London in 2015, at the age of 87.
