= Jan Hunt =

British comedian, actress and music hall performer (born 1938)

Jan Hunt (born 15 February 1938) is a British comedian, actress and music hall performer, who appeared on BBC television series Crackerjack with Michael Aspel, Ed Stewart, Peter Glaze and Don Maclean in the 1970s. She would often be seen playing an old lady in dramatisations, involving her donning a grey wig and glasses and putting her hand on her hip to suggest a bad back.

Her later career included playing Ellie May in Show Boat (Adelphi Theatre London 1971) in which she first performed her trademark "spoons" routine. She frequently performed at London's Players' Theatre, and on BBC TV's The Good Old Days, notably as Marie Lloyd. Her Paper Moon Theatre Company continues to provide music hall and variety shows throughout the UK.

Hunt is an honorary patron of The Music Hall Guild of Great Britain and America and of the British Music Hall Society.
