= Don Maclean =

British actor and comedian (born c.1942)

Don Maclean MBE KSS
- Born: 1942 or 1943 (age 83–84); Birmingham, England
- Occupations: Actor; comedian

Don Maclean MBE KSS (born 1942 or 1943) is an English actor and comedian, who appeared on the BBC television series Crackerjack with Michael Aspel, Peter Glaze and Jan Hunt in the 1970s.

Born in Birmingham, he attended Clifton Road School, Balsall Heath and St. Philip's School, which was a Roman Catholic grammar school for boys in Edgbaston. His first job was as a civil servant at the Inland Revenue, and he was an entertainer in pubs, clubs and holiday camps. Maclean's first television appearance was on the soap opera Crossroads, and early in his career he was a comedy compère of the BBC television series The Black and White Minstrel Show.

On Crackerjack, Maclean usually performed a live routine or routines with Glaze in front of a studio audience of children and a filmed insert with Glaze, in the style of a silent comedy film. Live routines would almost always work in the "joke" where an exasperated Glaze would exclaim "Maclean!" to which Maclean would answer "Yes, I had a bath this morning!". Also notable was that when responding to Glaze's exasperation, Maclean would regularly give an alliterative reply, such as "Don't get your knickers in a knot" or "Don't get your tights in a twist". Maclean also appeared in the film Carry On Columbus. A practising Roman Catholic, from 1990 Maclean presented BBC Radio 2's religious show Good Morning Sunday, until he was replaced by Aled Jones in 2006.

He hosted the panel games The Clever Dick-Athlon (1988–90) and Are You Sitting Comfortably (1993–96), both for Radio 2, and First Letter First (1993) for BBC1. He also toured in the play There's No Place Like a Home with Gorden Kaye. In 2009, he claimed that the BBC is keen on programmes which attack churches and that there is a wider secularist campaign to get rid of Christianity.

In 2006, Maclean pleaded guilty to drink-driving and had his licence suspended for twelve months.
