= British Music Hall Society =

Registered charity in the United Kingdom

- Abbreviation: BMHS
- Formation: 1963
- Type: Nonprofit
- Legal status: Charity
- Purpose: Advancement of knowledge of the music hall tradition, and preservation of memorabilia
- President: Su Pollard
- Chair: Dean Caston
- Website: britishmusichallsociety.com

The British Music Hall Society is a registered charity in the United Kingdom. The charity's objects ('the Objects') are:

1. To advance the education of the public in the traditions of the British Music Hall and Variety Theatre and the art of present day performers; and
2. To preserve an archive appertaining to Music Hall and Variety Theatre in the form of records, films, electronic media, photographs, literature, ephemera, costumes and performers' personal properties.

The charity was founded by Raymond Mackender and Gerald Glover in 1963. The Society President is Su Pollard. Its patrons are John Major, Michael Grade, Anne Dodd, Cliff Richard, Alan Titchmarsh, Alison Titchmarsh, Jools Holland, Jan Hunt and Gary Wilmot. Previous patrons included Des O'Connor, Ken Dodd and Val Doonican.

== History ==
The society was created following the demise and demolition of The Metropolitan Theatre, Edgware Road and other music halls in the early 1960s, coupled with Mackender and Glover's awareness that this period of performing history was being forgotten. Mackender put a series of advertisements in The Stage appealing for items of music hall interest 'for safekeeping....'. Out of this emerged the British Music Hall Society ("BMHS").

An Exhibition and Variety Show, known as the "Festival of Music Hall", was organised by the society and the then Variety Artistes' Federation on 2 November 1963 to celebrate the centenary of McDonald's Music Hall (now Hoxton Hall).

In December 1963, the first edition of the society's journal, The Call Boy, was published. The Journal continues as a quarterly publication, free to society members.

The first of what was to become a regular monthly meeting of the society took place on 7 January 1964 at the Garrick Hotel, Charing Cross Road, London, with Ada Reeve as the guest of honour.

In 2013, the society celebrated their 50th anniversary with a Festival of Music Hall (and Variety) at Wilton's Music Hall, Whitechapel, London. Since 2014, the society has held an annual one-day event, Day by the Sea, at the Royal Hippodrome Theatre, Eastbourne, featuring comedy, music, discussion and film footage.

The society holds an extensive archive, with photographs, posters, sheet music, playbills, programmes and the personal items of many artistes including Marie Lloyd, Little Tich, Max Miller, Florrie Forde, Ida Barr, Hetty King, Ella Shields and Harry Tate. They also hold a sound archive. The society is a member of the Association of Performing Arts Collections (APAC).

== Presidents - past and present ==
- 1963–1979 - Don Ross
- 1980–1983 - Lew Lane
- 1984–1985 - Ellis Ashton
- 1986–1992 - Louis Benjamin
- 1992–2020 - Roy Hudd
- 2020–2023 - Paul O'Grady
- 2023–present - Su Pollard
