= The Heist (TV series) =

British Reality TV competition produced by Shine TV

The Heist is a British reality television competition series produced by Shine TV that began airing on Sky One in the UK in 2018. The first series of six episodes premiered on 9 November 2018. A second series of eight episodes premiered on 6 February 2020. Series One is available on Amazon Prime Video in the United States.

== Premise ==
The programme, similar in format to Hunted (which is also produced by Shine TV), is a competition between a group of ordinary citizens ("The Thieves") and a team of former police and intelligence officers ("The Detectives"). The Thieves are given the opportunity to "steal" money and escape. The Detectives are told only that a robbery has occurred and then use legal investigative techniques and resources (interviews with the public, access to CCTV feeds and mobile phone records of suspects, vehicle license plate tracking, etc.) to identify the participants, track them down and recover the stolen money (or if spent, the items purchased). A referee (Kevin O'Leary, former Scotland Yard Detective Chief Superintendent) determines if the Detectives would have realistically and legally had access to requested information; if so, it is provided or recreated by the programme.

In Series One, ten Thieves have the opportunity to take up to £250,000 (in notes and coins) from an unattended armoured car. In Series Two, nine Thieves can take up to £1 million after breaking into a bank vault. Each Thief can have an accomplice (friend or family member) drive them away from the "heist" to a location where the money taken will be equally divided ("the slaughter"). The Thieves can then hide or spend their share as they see fit (spending money may increase the risk of being located), while the Detectives attempt to identify them, recover the money, and collect enough evidence to legally charge them for the theft. Suspected Thieves can be brought in for questioning, and can be arrested and held for 24 hours, pending being charged. Any Thief charged with sufficient evidence loses their share of the money. On the 16th day (20th day in Series 2) the remaining Thieves at large must meet at a pre-determined location to "launder" their remaining cash and escape.

== Cast ==
=== Series One ===
==== The Thieves ====
Thief	Relationship	Heist Job	Getaway Driver	Hiding Places	Episode 1	Episode 2	Episode 3	Episode 4	Epiaode 5	Episode 6
Georgia; Ben	Friends	-	Dan Shaples (friend)	Loot hidden at workplace	-	Arrested Charged	-	-	-	-
Georgia; Ben	Friends	Lookout	Dan Shaples (friend)	Loot hidden at workplace	-	Arrested Charged	-	-	-	-
Jonny; Emma	Engaged Sheep Farmers	Point Man	Andrew Kane (farmer)	Loot hidden in grain silo and forest	-	-	Interviewed	Arrested Charged	-	-
Jonny; Emma	Engaged Sheep Farmers	Signaller	Andrew Kane (farmer)	Loot hidden in grain silo and forest	-	-	Interviewed	Arrested Charged	-	-
Jessica Laura	Sisters	Lock Picker	Steve (father)	Loot hidden in rain barrel and beehive	-	-	Interviewed	Arrested	-	Charged
Jessica Laura	Sisters	-	Steve (father)	Loot hidden in rain barrel and beehive	-	-	Interviewed	-	-	Charged
Diane Ian	Married	Lock Picker	Brett (friend)	Loot hidden in fire pit and ice cream tubs	-	-	-	Interviewed	Arrested Charged	-
Diane Ian	Married	-	Brett (friend)	Loot hidden in fire pit and ice cream tubs	-	-	-	Interviewed	Arrested	Escaped with Loot
Jonathan Norman	Father & Son	Bag Man	David Joyce (friend)	Loot hidden in scrapyard	-	-	-	-	-	Charged
Jonathan Norman	Father & Son	-	David Joyce (friend)	-	-	-	-	Interviewed	Arrested	Escaped with Loot

==== The Detectives ====
Name	Role	Background
Sue Hill	"The Gov'nor" (head of the Detectives)	Former Detective Chief Superintendent Metropolitan Police
Ray Howard	The Deputy	Former Detective Superintendent Thames Valley Police
Keely Smith	Investigation Manager	Former Detective Inspector Metropolitan Police
Jane Maisey	Crime Scene Manager	Former Senior Scene of Crime Officer Surrey & Sussex Police
Paula Grant	Intelligence Officer	Former Intelligence Specialist
Sukie Madahar	Investigator	Former Detective Sergeant Metropolitan Police
Alecia Emerson-Thomas	Investigator	Former Police Constable Avon & Somerset Police
Craig Stevens	Investigator	Former Police Detective Cheshire Police
David Bolton	Investigator	Former Detective Sergeant Merseyside Police
David Laing	Investigator	Police Constable Gwent Police
Georgina Bradley	Investigator	Detective Constable Thames Valley Police
Irene Afful	Investigator	Former Detective Inspector Merseyside Police
Oliver Mundy	Investigator	Former Case Manager Kent Police
Paul McAnulty	Investigator	Former Senior Intelligence Analyst Leicestershire Police

==== Narrator ====
Pip Torrens

=== Series Two ===
==== The Thieves ====
- Hellen Cole-Joyce (58) & Leonie Airlie (31)
- Christine Jeffries (68) & Garry Jeffries (42)
- Helen Ruff (59, former police officer)
- Micky Craig (38, ship captain) & Ryan Gray (27)
- Will Bell (24) & Ishy Khatun (26)

==== The Detectives ====
Name	Role	Background
Sue Hill	"The Gov'nor" (head of the Detectives	Former Detective Chief Superintendent Metropolitan Police
Ray Howard	The Deputy	Former Detective Superintendent Thames Valley Police
Keely Smith	Investigation Manager	Former Detective Inspector Metropolitan Police
Alecia Emerson-Thomas	Investigator	Former Police Constable Avon & Somerset Police
Susie Madahar	Investigator	Former Detective Sergeant Metropolitan Police

== Production ==
The first series was filmed in and around the market town of Thirsk, in Yorkshire. The Thieves were all residents of the town or the surrounding area. The crime scene was filmed on Marage Road, adjacent to St. Mary's Church. An old library was used as the police station.

The second series was filmed in and around the town of Alnwick in Northumberland. The Duchess's Community High School served as the local police station. A storefront at 41 Fenkle Street stood in as the fictitious "Bank of Northumbria".

== Episodes ==
=== Series One ===
Episode	Air Date	Synopsis
Ep 1 (Day 1)	9 November 2018	The 10 Thieves are given instructions, maps of the town where the heist will occur, and keys to enter the armored car. They break in and take £250,000 in £10 bills and £1 coins. Accomplices drive them to a nearby farm where the money is split up, and then help them to escape. The Thieves nickname themselves the “White Horse Bandits” and leave a taunting message for the Detectives. The Detectives investigate the crime scene, and adjacent CCTV feeds, determining that 8 people were involved and observe that one potential thief has failed to cover his face. A money box equipped with GPS tracker leads them to the farm. Investigators begin to canvas the area near the heist.
Ep 2 (Days 1–2)	16 November 2018	Some of the thieves choose to spend some of their money. The Detectives use mobile phone tracking to identify phone numbers that were close to both the site of the heist and the farm; one is linked to Dan Sharples, the accomplice of Ben and Georgia, whom they learn works at a pub next to the police station. When Detectives covertly enter the pub, they see Ben, who resembles the unmasked thief in their captured video. Daniel Sharples is also questioned and implicates Ben and an unknown woman (“G”). On his phone, the Detectives find video of Georgia and links to her on Ben's social media. The Deputy decides to release Ben and have him tailed to see if he meets up with her. They are followed to a shopping center where they are arrested after spending some of the cash and having additional cash on their person. Georgia confesses to being involved; both are charged. Andrew Kane is also identified by mobile phone data and questioned. His phone shows a phone call to Jonny Easton.
Ep 3 (Days 3–7)	23 November 2018	The Detectives launch an information campaign with public radio and social media requests for information on the Heist. A Community meeting is disrupted when Ian and Dianne hire an ice-cream truck to show up at the meeting and offer free ice cream, courtesy of the White Horse Bandits. Detectives start to search for sales transactions involving large numbers of notes or coins and learn that Laura and Jessica used £90 of coins to buy playground sand for a nursery school. The Detectives are ordered to arrest Jonny but not Emma; the two are then interviewed to see if their stories match. During Emma's interview at the farm, a listening device picks up Emma calling her father (their accomplice) and telling him to say he was with them on the farm the day of the heist. With this evidence, Jonny and Emma are arrested and the farm is searched for the money.
Ep 4 (Days 7–9)	30 November 2018	Detectives discover coins from the heist in Jonny & Emma's stove. They are arrested and interrogated; Jonny and Emma confess and are charged. Based on the amounts recovered (£25,000 each), the detectives determine that there are ten thieves rather than eight. The Thieves continue to build public support by paying local businesses to provide free food and goods. Meanwhile, Norman's daughter Stacy posts a “White Horse Bandits” cartoon on her social media site. The detectives determine that Stacy contacted the ice cream truck by phone; she says she was hiring the truck for a wedding and had gotten the number from friends Diane and Ian. Worried that they will be investigated, they move their share of the loot to a local pub, hiding it in a tub of ice cream. A tip comes in that David Joyce had said he was a getaway driver for one of the thieves. Social media links connect him to Jonathan Pearson who works at a local Garden Center. Norman and Jonathan use this connection to buy goods with £3,900 in untraceable coins. Detectives interview Norman Pearson who says he does not have Jonathan's phone number. Following their interview, Laura and Jessica move their cash to their grandfather's and parents' houses (hidden in a beehive). At his interview David Joyce is confronted with CCTV video of the transaction at the Garden Center. With inadequate evidence of criminal involvement however, the Detectives are forced to release him. The Detectives track Jonathan to a fishing lake, but cannot find them in the dark. Jonathan and Norman escape with the help of friend Zoe. Laura and Jessica engage in a spending spree to get rid of their share of the loot but are tracked by auto license plate recognition and CCTV video. While Laura continues to hide, Jessica is forced to show up at work the next day and is arrested.
Ep 5 (Days 9–12)	7 December 2018	While being interrogated, Jessica claims the purchase of sand with £90 in coins was made with fundraising money, but inadvertently mentions that a share of the loot was £25,000 (a fact not publicly known). She is released with plans to bring Laura in the next day. Multiple calls from Diane's phone are linked to Sue who owns the local bookshop and who attended the community meeting. Detective encounter Diane at the bookshop, search her bag and discover a money band for £10 notes and sequentially numbered bills. She is arrested and brought in for questioning. £880 in stolen money is identified, Diane says the money came from her husband Ian. Detective obtain a warrant to search Diane and Ian's house, and find a shopping list of items needed to pull off the heist. Norman and Jonathan hide out at a friend's house, but plan to sneak back home to pick up supplies. The Detectives review the video from the Garden Center and identify Norman as the 10th suspect. Norman and Jonathan decide to split up to reduce the chances that they are both caught. Ian comes to the police station for an interview and is arrested; a £10 note from the heist is found. He says the money that Dianne had was a down-payment for work he was going to do at the pub. The Detectives drive to the pub to interview the owner (Steve) but Diane walks there via a back route to retrieve the loot and escapes. A DNA test on one of the cash box returns a hit on Diane. Diane is re-arrested and confesses, but denies Ian was involved.
Ep 6 (Days 13–16)	14 December 2018	Following Diane's confession, the Detectives drive to re-arrest Ian, but he escapes on foot. Jonathan hides at a friend's house close to home. Norman is re-arrested and a DNA sample is taken; he is released on bail. Jonathan hides out at the home of friend Zoe. Zoe drives him to pick up his case before heading to the laundering site (the town of Whitby, 50 miles away). However the car is tracked by license plate cameras en route and a team of Detectives begin to follow them. Jonathan attempts to escape on foot; is apprehended with his share of the loot, and is charged with theft. The Detectives suspect that the remaining Thieves will try to get out of town, and place tracking devices on all of the suspected Thieves’ cars. Jessica and Laura's car is searched, but no loot is found. Ian has been camping out and retrieves his loot from a neighbor's garden. He leaves £1,000 for the Yorkshire ambulance corps which is reported to the Detectives. Knowing that Ian is avoiding his car, the Detectives launch a drone to search for him. A DNA hit from the "slaughter" site comes back for Norman; he can be charged if located. Laura and Jessica reclaim their loot and walk to a nearby town to spend the final night. They inadvertently run into Jonny and Emma and then are discovered by the Detectives who catch them with their share of the loot. On the final day, Norman borrows an untracked car to drive to the town of Whitby. Ian calls his mother (whose phone is being monitored) for transportation, and takes a bus to meet her, barely evading the Detectives. The Detectives determine that the Thieves are traveling east, but assume they are heading for a different town (Scarborough). Ian gets a ride from his mother, who car is caught by a license place tracker heading to Whitby. By the time the Detectives arrive, Norman and Ian have successfully laundered their loot and escaped.
