= XYZ (game show) =

- Genre: Game show
- Presented by: George Marshall
- Country of origin: United Kingdom
- Original language: English
- No. of series: 1
- No. of episodes: 32

Production
- Running time: 25 minutes
- Production companies: Channel X and BBC North

Original release
- Network: BBC1
- Release: 15 November 1993 – 26 January 1994

XYZ is a British game show that aired on BBC1 from 15 November 1993 to 26 January 1994 and is hosted by George Marshall.

== Format ==
On each edition, three contestants competed against each other for the chance to play for a major prize.

The game is played on a board of 24 squares called the "Alphabank", which featured the first 23 letters of the alphabet, with the 24th square being the 'XYZ' square. The objective of the game was to create the longest continuous chain of letters without any breaks in the sequence.
