= Totally Top Trumps =

2004 British game show

- Presented by: Andy Goldstein
- Starring: Rob Deering; Dan Clark; Jack Waley-Cohen
- Country of origin: United Kingdom
- No. of series: 1
- No. of episodes: 20

Production
- Production company: Princess Productions

Original release
- Network: Challenge
- Release: 2004

Totally Top Trumps was a British gameshow that aired on Challenge for 20 episodes in 2004. It was presented by Andy Goldstein and supported by captains Rob Deering, Dan Clark and scorer/quiz geek Jack Waley-Cohen. It was loosely based on the card game Top Trumps.

== Format ==
There were four rounds to the show, involving two teams of celebrities who battled it out for the trump card. Questions ranged from classic cars and football, to 80s film and television.

== Celebrity guests ==
Celebrities who appeared on the show included:

- Ewen MacIntosh
- Kate Lawler
- Rowland Rivron
- Marcus Brigstocke
- Robert Llewellyn
- Vicki Butler-Henderson
