= Eliminator (game show) =

British children's quiz show

- Genre: Children's quiz show
- Presented by: Michael Underwood
- Starring: Eliminator; Oakley Turvey (2003); Dan Cade (2004)
- Country of origin: United Kingdom
- Original language: English
- No. of series: 2
- No. of episodes: 26

Production
- Running time: 30 minutes (inc. adverts)
- Production company: Initial

Original release
- Network: ITV (CITV)
- Release: 6 January 2003 – 29 April 2004

Eliminator is a children's quiz show in which a group of three children have to answer questions in order to get to the next level of the game, while being chased by a demon named the "Eliminator" who would try to reach them. The show produced two series between 6 January 2003 and 29 April 2004, and was presented by Michael Underwood.

== Rules ==
The aim of the game would be to try to get to the next level, by jumping squares, similar to a board game, without the Eliminator catching the team and eliminating them from the game. After the computer randomly selects one of the eight question categories, they could choose to answer an easy question to move one square, a medium question to move two squares, or a hard question to move three squares. All questions are multiple choice, with 3 possible answers in Series 1, and 4 possible answers in Series 2.

=== Levels ===
The game consisted of three levels, each separated by doors in Series 1, and linked by a lift in Series 2. On the first question, the Eliminator does not move to give the team a head start. After the team's second question, if the team was on level one, Eliminator would move one square behind them. In the same way, if the team was on level two, Eliminator would move two squares behind them, and would move three squares behind them if they were on level three. Level 1, being an underground tunnel (Series 1) or a cave (Series 2) had the first four steps, with Level 2 being a street (Series 1) or underwater submarine corridor (Series 2) having the next six steps and level 3 being set on the rooftops (Series 1) or on a bridge high in the cloudy sky (Series 2) having the last eight steps in Series 1, and the last ten steps in Series 2. In Series 2, a Surprise Step was introduced, in which a klaxon would sound if the team triggered it. The computer would secretly select a Forfeit or Reward Step; on Forfeit Steps, the team could potentially lose a team member, move back a square or The Eliminator would take extra moves if the team got the question wrong, and on Reward Steps, the team would win a prize or take extra moves without the Eliminator moving if they got the question right.

=== Ending ===
At the end of Level 2, the team can either choose to continue the game into level 3 in the hopes of winning a holiday, or if they are not feeling that brave, they could leave the game with a smaller prize. In Series 2, if a team decided to take home one of the smaller prizes on offer, it would also result in the Eliminator eliminating them from the game. Near the end of the game, contestants would mainly have to answer the hardest questions, which, when correctly answered, resulted in larger amounts of movement. This kept Eliminator from catching up to them and taking their prizes.

The team would win a holiday together at the end. In the first series, if the team makes it to the prize tunnel, The Eliminator would get very angry because he was so desperate to eliminate the team from winning the star prize. If a team makes it to the Prize Tunnel, they are given 30 seconds to name as many things within a subject given to them, with each correct answer giving them a better holiday, with 10 being the target to win the ultimate holiday, which in Series 1 was a Safari in Africa, and in Series 2 was a trip to The Bahamas. Other notable holiday prizes included a multi-activity holiday in the UK, and a holiday to Andalusia in Spain.

== Transmissions ==
Series	Episodes	Originally released	
Series	Episodes	First released	Last released
1	13	6 January 2003	31 March 2003
2	13	5 February 2004	29 April 2004
