= Cogito (magazine) =

Philosophical magazine

- Categories: Philosophy magazine
- Frequency: Annual
- Publisher: Nefeli Publications
- Founded: 2004
- Country: Greece
- Website: www.nnet.gr/cogito/cogitoindex.htm

Cogito is a philosophical magazine published by Nefeli publications (Athens, Greece) and a member of the Eurozine network. It was founded in 2004 with the intention of making philosophy accessible to the lay reader without compromising it through oversimplification. Cogito is therefore an attempt to approach everyday issues and themes through a philosophically rigorous lens. Contributors, most of them professional philosophers but also academics from a variety of disciplines, as well as writers, consider such varied topics as colors, taste, gardens, cinema, desire and love, art and aesthetics, and logical paradoxes. Each issue, consisting of a number of articles, is dedicated to a different topic: privacy, intelligence both natural and artificial, applied ethics, history and narrative, friendship. Each issue further presents a philosopher to its readers. In the past, subjects of this 'philosophical library' have included Plato, Wittgenstein, J.S. Mill, and Kant.
