= As Seen on TV (game show) =

2009 British game show

- Presented by: Steve Jones
- Country of origin: United Kingdom
- Original language: English
- No. of series: 1
- No. of episodes: 8

Production
- Executive producers: Karen Smith; Robin Ashbrook
- Producer: Leon Wilde
- Production company: Shine TV

Original release
- Network: BBC One
- Release: 17 July – 3 September 2009

As Seen on TV is a BBC television panel game show based around TV trivia. It is produced by Shine TV by arrangement with Unique Broadcasting; the latter is the company owned by Noel Edmonds, who presented the similarly themed show Telly Addicts.

It is presented by Steve Jones, with team captains Fern Britton and Jason Manford.

The first episode was broadcast on Friday 17 July 2009. It was moved to a Thursday evening slot from its second episode.

== Rounds ==
=== Round 1: What's on TV? ===
The teams are shown six TV programmes which are categories related to TV based questions. Each player gets to pick one category each.

The shows are:

- Big Break – The team is asked which member of the other had done something when they were much younger, or, which celebrity made their big break on a specific soap. They have to guess which one for the point.
- Extras – A question about someone appearing as a TV show extra is asked. Answer correctly for a point.
- Futurama – The team is show a picture of someone as they might look in the future. They have to guess who it is for the point.
- Location, Location, Location – The team are shown a picture of a famous TV setting, minus its characters. The place and show need to be identified for a point.
- M*A*S*H – A TV clip is shown with the music from another one in the background. The team has to identify both to get the point.
- One Foot in the Grave – The team have to guess how a character from a TV show died to get the point.
- Songs of Praise – The team sees a church congregation sing a TV theme tune. They need to guess which one for the point.
- Surprise, Surprise – The team is shown a clip of a TV show, which is then paused before something surprising happens. The team has to get what happens next for the point.
- The Apprentice – Using pictures from an "apprentice cameraman, the team has to work out where the cameraman is.
- The Clangers – The teams are shown a clip of a famous gaffe on TV, with some words bleeped out. They have to guess the words for the point.
- Top of the Pops – Resident Beatboxer "Beardyman" will perform a TV theme tune in his own style. The team has to guess which tune it is for the point.
- What Not to Wear – A clip is shown of Steve dressing up as a popular character from a TV show. The team has to guess who for the point.
- Who Do You Think You Are? – The team is shown a picture with the heads of characters from another show superimposed on the original picture. The team needs to identify both shows for the point.
- The X Factor – The team are shown 3 characters from TV shows, who had relationships with the same person. The teams have to work out who the person is for the point.

=== Round 2: TV Years ===
Each team is shown a clip of TV shows which all started in the same year. They are asked 2 questions about certain parts of the clip and a further point for guessing the correct year.

=== Round 3: Thingy Off The Telly ===
Each team tries to guess a person who has been on the TV from a particular TV show, hence they're called the "Thingy Off The Telly". They can ask as many Yes/No questions as they want until Steve passes it over to the other team.

=== Round 4: TV Gold/TV Lists ===
Round 4 was either a game called "TV Gold", in which the team is shown a clip from a TV show and have to answer 3 related questions about the show or another game called "TV Lists" where the studio audience are asked which of 9 people or things from a certain category they like the best. The team then has to work out the audience top 3, then the audience top 1.

=== Round 5: Name That Show ===
The teams are shown pictures of TV shows and have to buzz in when they can identify them. They get 2 points for a correct answer, but 1 is deducted for an incorrect answer. Whoever is in the lead at the end of the round wins the show.

== Episodes ==
– Indicates Fern's team won.
– Indicates Jason's team won.

| No. | Fern's guests | Score | Jason's guests | Original release date |
|---|---|---|---|---|
| 1 | Laurence Llewelyn-Bowen, Tina Hobley | 15–14 | Pauline Quirke, Lauren Laverne | 17 July 2009 |
| 2 | Rufus Hound, Diane Parish | 17–6 | Kate Garraway, John Craven | 23 July 2009 |
| 3 | Peter Serafinowicz, James Martin | 9–22 | Debra Stephenson, Michelle Collins | 30 July 2009 |
| 4 | Danny Wallace, Sally Lindsay | 19–3 | Jo Joyner, Marshall Lancaster | 6 August 2009 |
| 5 | Richard Fleeshman, Anton du Beke | 10–11 | Melanie Sykes, Christopher Biggins | 13 August 2009 |
| 6 | Bradley Walsh, Hardeep Singh Kohli | 22–15 | Arlene Phillips, Dermot Murnaghan | 20 August 2009 |
| 7 | Dom Joly, Joe Pasquale | 9–12 | Angela Griffin, Eamonn Holmes | 27 August 2009 |
| 8 | Laurie Brett, James Fleet | 7–12 | Jodie Prenger, Clare Balding | 3 September 2009 |
