= First Letter First =

- Genre: Game show
- Presented by: Don Maclean
- Country of origin: United Kingdom
- Original language: English
- No. of series: 1
- No. of episodes: 32

Production
- Running time: 25 minutes
- Production company: BBC North

Original release
- Network: BBC1
- Release: 5 January – 23 March 1993

First Letter First is a British game show that aired on BBC1 from 5 January to 23 March 1993 and is hosted by Don Maclean.
