= Battle of the Brains (British game show) =

- Genre: Quiz show
- Presented by: Paddy O'Connell (Series 1); Nicky Campbell (Series 2)
- Country of origin: United Kingdom
- Original language: English
- No. of series: 2
- No. of episodes: 40

Production
- Running time: 30 minutes
- Production companies: Shine TV and BBC Manchester

Original release
- Network: BBC Two
- Release: 28 July 2008 – 6 March 2009

Battle of the Brains is a quiz show that aired on BBC Two from 28 July 2008 to 6 March 2009.

== Round 1 ==
Each captain chooses one member from their team of 6 to take part in one of 5 (6 in series 1) different tests of skill in one of 15 different categories. This happens 5 times in the first round and any member of the team can play except the team captain. If the player is successful they rejoin their team, if not, then the player is eliminated. If one team is totally successful, then they would have all 6 players intact, while the other team would be down to one. In series 2, the types of challenge stuck to a specific order; Speed, Memory, Wisdom, Identity and Nerve.

The 6 different types of challenge are:

- Speed – The players will be asked questions about the chosen subject on the buzzer. The winner is the first person to answer three questions correctly. In series 2, this was increased to five questions answered correctly.
- Memory – The players have to take it turns to name things of a list relating to the chosen subject. The round ends when an incorrect answer is given, an answer is repeated or if no answer is given within 5 seconds.
- Wisdom – Both players will have 60 seconds on the chosen subject to answer as many questions as possible. The person with the most correct answers wins. If there is a tie, a sudden death tie-breaker question on the buzzers is asked.
- Identity – The players are asked to identify one thing related to the chosen subject. Clues are read out by Paddy/Nicky one at a time. The player who answers the question first wins the round. If the player answers incorrectly, they are frozen out of the next clue.
- Nerve – Like a penalty shootout, each player is answered a question each. If Player 1 answers correctly, then Player 2 would have to answer correctly or lose. If Player 1 answered incorrectly and Player 2 answered correctly, then Player 1 would lose. If both players did the same, the round will continue. If it was still a tie after 5 questions each, it would go down to a sudden-death buzzer question.

In series 1, there was a 6th option, which was removed from series 2:

- Accuracy – The players are asked three nearest-to-the-mark questions. The person who gets the nearest to the correct answer wins a point. The first to 2 wins. If both players type in the same answer, both get a point and it would become the first to 3 correct answers who would win.

The 15 different categories are:

- Animal Kingdom
- Art
- Classical World
- Film & TV
- Food & Drink
- Geography
- Great Britain
- History
- Literature
- Music
- Nature
- Politics
- Science
- Sport
- Transport & Technology

== Round 2 ==
In the second round, the players who won the head-to-heads in round 1, along with the player who didn't play compete in a series of questions. The captain of the opposing team chooses which player to answer the question. If the answer is correct, the player stays, if the answer is wrong, the player is eliminated. This continues until one team has no players left.

== Final round ==
The winning team gets all their players regenerated. They have 90 seconds to get 6 consecutive questions correct. The question is read out, the captain chooses a player. If they get it right their light is turned on and they can't answer another question. If they answer wrong, then everyone's light is turned off. If all 6 lights are on the team wins. In the first series, the prize was £2,000 on each show. In the second series, the prize fund started at £1,000, but if the team failed to win, the money rolled over to the next show.

== Captain's Question ==
Following the final round the team captain has to answer a question correctly. With the captain turned around, so no signals of any kind can be made, Paddy/Nicky offers the team 2 questions. They have to pick which one their captain will know the answer to. If the captain answers correctly the team can return to the next show. If answered incorrectly the team are eliminated and 2 new teams appear on the next show. (Incidentally, the captain gets asked the other question to see if he/she would have known the right answer.)

== Transmissions ==
Series	Start date	End date	Episodes
1	28 July 2008	22 August 2008	20
2	9 February 2009	6 March 2009	20
