= Take It or Leave It (game show) =

- Genre: Game show
- Created by: Intellygents for 2waytraffic
- Presented by: Richard Arnold
- Narrated by: Sarah Cawood (2006–2007); Richard Arnold (2008)
- Country of origin: United Kingdom
- Original language: English
- No. of series: 3
- No. of episodes: 91

Production
- Producer: Greg Barnett
- Production location: Pinewood Studios
- Running time: 60 minutes (including adverts)
- Production companies: TWI (2006); Tiger Aspect Productions (2007–2008)

Original release
- Network: Challenge
- Release: 23 October 2006 – 18 July 2008

Take It or Leave It is a British game show, developed by Dutch format company Intellygents, that aired on the digital channel Challenge. Challenge tends to air repeats of classic game shows that have been commissioned by other broadcasters, but it is considered rare that they produce original content. The show originally aired from 23 October 2006 to 18 July 2008 and was hosted by Richard Arnold.

== Format ==
Two teams of two players each compete. One team is brought onto the set and given a brief introduction about a second team. They must then decide whether to play against this team, or reject them in favour of a third team about whom no information is given beforehand. The first team begins the game at one end of a 10-step path, while the chosen opponents sit in the "Sin Bin," a waiting area to one side of the stage.

=== Phase one ===
The team in control is asked a question and shown an answer. They must decide whether to "take it" or "leave it," based respectively on whether they believe the answer is correct or incorrect. If they choose to leave it, a second answer is displayed instead and they are automatically committed to taking it. One of the two answers is correct.

Taking the correct answer or leaving the incorrect one allows each team member to choose one safe from a set of 20 displayed on a video wall. Eighteen of these safes contain cash amounts ranging from 1p to £15,000. The two chosen safes are opened one at a time; if the first safe contains cash, the team may either add it to the game's final jackpot and move on to the next question, or reject it in favour of whatever is in the second safe. The remaining two safes contain "Booby Traps" which, if found, immediately force the team to trade places with their opponents in the Sin Bin and end the turn without any money being added to the jackpot. Regardless of the outcome, the team advances one step along the path and both chosen safes are removed from play, with the second safe also being opened to reveal its contents if necessary.

Leaving the correct answer or taking the incorrect one forces the two teams to trade places, without the option to choose any safes on that turn, and immediately brings up the next question.

=== Final phase ===
The team that reaches the end of the path is confronted with six safes, one of which contains the jackpot; the other five are empty. They are asked five questions, each with the "take it"/"leave it" option as before, but are not immediately told which of their answers are correct. After all five questions have been asked, they are displayed in a random order, with any correctly answered questions being displayed first.

As each question is shown, the team must decide whether to play the answer they took. Playing a correct answer eliminates one empty safe, but playing an incorrect answer at any time ends the game and sends the team home with nothing. If the team believes one of their answers is incorrect, they may choose not to play it and are then given one chance to choose a safe; they win the jackpot if they find it, or nothing if they do not.

If the team answers all five questions correctly and chooses to play every answer, they automatically win the jackpot.

=== Safe values ===
Series 1-2	Series 3
£15,000	£15,000
£12,500	£12,500
£7,500	£7,500
£5,000	£5,000
£3,500	£3,500
£2,000	£2,500
£1,000	£1,500
£900	£1,000
£750	£800
£600	£700
£500	£500
£350	£350
£250	£250
£150	£150
£5	£5
50p	50p
10p	10p
1p	1p

== International versions ==
The show premiered in Netherlands on 4 March 2006 and was called Kies de kluis. The game show ran for 2 seasons on NED1.

On the Hungarian TV channel RTL Klub was aired the show since 27 December 2007 with shorter/longer breaks. It is called A széf (The safe) and broadcast at 19:00 on weekdays. The show is still popular regularly winning its timeslot. The new season started at 28 March 2012. If the players choose the highest possible combination of the safes, they can win 20,000,000 ft (€80,000). The highest prize in a safe is 7,000,000 ft (€28,000).

Country	Title	Network	Host	Date aired
Netherlands (original version)	Kies de kluis	NPO 1	Marc Klein Essink	2006
Italy	Il malloppo	Rai 1	Pupo; Alda D'Eusanio	2005–2006
Hungary	A széf	RTL Klub	Balázs Sebestyén	2007–2012

Other versions of the game show were also aired in Turkey, Dubai, Greece and North Macedonia.

== Transmissions ==
Series	Start date	End date	Episodes
1	23 October 2006	1 December 2006	30
2	16 April 2007	25 May 2007	30
3	6 June 2008	18 July 2008	31
