= All Clued Up =

UK game show

- Genre: Game show
- Based on: The $1,000,000 Chance of a Lifetime by The El Encanto Group
- Presented by: David Hamilton
- Announcer: Nick Jackson (uncredited)
- Country of origin: United Kingdom
- Original language: English
- No. of series: 4
- No. of episodes: 88

Production
- Production location: The Maidstone Studios
- Running time: 30 minutes (inc. adverts)
- Production companies: TVS in association with Lorimar-Telepictures and Action Time

Original release
- Network: ITV
- Release: 17 April 1988 – 30 August 1991

Related
- The $1,000,000 Chance of a Lifetime (American version)

All Clued Up is a British game show based on the American version entitled The $1,000,000 Chance of a Lifetime. It aired on ITV from 17 April 1988 to 30 August 1991 and was hosted by David Hamilton.

== Format ==
Like the American show, two married couples competed to solve word puzzles which led to a master solution, in a game show combining the elements of Definition, Scrabble and Wheel of Fortune in North America.

=== Toss-Up Puzzle ===
The game begins with a toss-up puzzle. Each letter is revealed one at a time in a word except for the last letter, and whoever buzzed in with the correct answer won £10 and the right to pick two letters from a keyboard.

=== Main Phrase Puzzle ===
Like in America, the couple with a correct guess gets to choose two letters that are in the master puzzle (the UK called theirs the "Main Phrase Puzzle"). They'll choose letters from a keyboard. The keyboard contained all 26 letters, plus a star, which is used to represent markings other than letters such as apostrophes or hyphens. Letters that are in the puzzle are highlighted on the keyboard, plus, one letter that is not in the puzzle, which is called a "stinger", which if picked, causes the team to lose a turn. For each letter revealed in the word, £10 is added to a bank, and the team that correctly solves the puzzle wins the pot.

After two letters are picked, if no correct guess is given, another toss-up puzzle is played. Each toss-up puzzle is a clue to the main phrase puzzle that's in play.

Three rounds (sometimes more) were played with the value doubling to £20 later on in the game, and when the time-up buzzer signifies the end of the game, further screen puzzles and clues in normal game play would be declared null and void and the winning couple would advance to the bonus round. The runners-up however, take the money they won in the game; in the fourth and final series, however, the runners-up win the All Clued Up engraved pen set.

For the fourth and final series, pounds became points.

== Bonus Round ==
For the first series, the couple is placed inside an isolation booth; from series two to four, the couple stands in front of the keyboard instead. They choose one of three possible categories and have 60 seconds to guess six words or phrases pertaining to that category. There were no plungers or buttons to stop the clock, as once a word or phrase is guessed, the next word or phrase is immediately put in play. One letter in the word appeared every one and a half seconds.

During the first two series, getting all six on their first appearance won £1,000. The winning couple could then risk £500 for the right to return the next day for chance to play the bonus game again for an additional £3,000, or retire undefeated.

In the third series, the rule was changed, which meant that the winning couple would have 50 seconds in the hope of winning £2,000 for getting all six on their first and only appearance.

For series four (the final series), the winning couple would still have 50 seconds, but the prize was reduced to £500 (due to being a daily daytime series). Alongside the All Clued Up engraved pen set for both couples, the winning couple also received the leather-bound Oxford Reference Dictionary.

== Transmissions ==
Series	Start date	End date	Episodes
1	17 April 1988	14 August 1988	18
2	18 June 1989	3 September 1989	12
3	20 May 1990	19 August 1990	14
4	24 June 1991	30 August 1991	44

=== Regional transmissions information ===
==== 1988 ====
The first series aired on Sundays across all ITV regions.

==== 1989 ====
The second series was not networked, with most ITV companies broadcasting the series across the year at different times but mainly on Sundays, except for Scottish Television, who broadcast episodes on Monday afternoon during the autumn of 1989.

==== 1990 ====
This series was shown on Sunday evenings during the summer.

==== 1991 ====
The fourth series aired on Monday to Friday mornings at 9:25am for the first 20 episodes from 24 June to 19 July. It was then switched to Tuesday to Friday afternoons at 2:50pm for the remaining 24 episodes from 23 July to 30 August.
