= Ian Cognito =

English stand-up comedian (1958–2019)

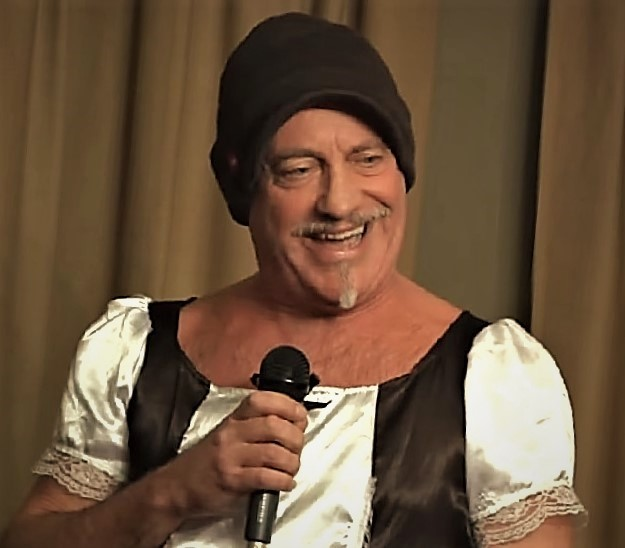
- Cognito in 2013
- Born: Paul John Barbieri; 21 November 1958; London, England
- Died: 11 April 2019 (aged 60); Bicester, Oxfordshire, England
- Education: University of Bath
- Children: 2

Comedy career
- Years active: 1985–2019
- Website: iancognito.org

Paul John Barbieri (21 November 1958 – 11 April 2019), known professionally as Ian Cognito, was an English stand-up comedian. He won the Time Out Award for Stand-up Comedy in 1999.

Cognito had an aggressive stage persona and a reputation as Britain’s "most banned" comic. Nevertheless, he was widely rated as a masterful performer with an innate grasp of stagecraft, inviting comparisons to iconoclasts like Lenny Bruce, Bill Hicks, and Jerry Sadowitz.

Cognito died in 2019 after suffering a stroke during one of his performances. A posthumous film about his life won Best Feature Documentary at the LA Indies in 2021.

== Biography ==
Cognito was born on 21 November 1958 in London of Irish and Italian ancestry. He first performed stand-up in 1985 and likened his stage name to Dr Jekyll creating Mr Hyde.

He openly embraced his excesses, once throwing a television from a hotel window ("room service was late") and often bringing a hammer on stage, banging a nail into a wall and hanging up his hat then saying: "This lets you know two things about me. Firstly, I really don't give a shit. Secondly, I've got a hammer."

In his memoir he said: "I was always pushing the envelope. I regret the dangerous ones and tried not to be too shocking (because that is easy to do). If I did shock, there was always a reason for what I did, even if it was taking my knob out. I was building a contradictory reputation as a dodgement (Note: Doubtful or suspect.) and a great compere. If I was booked, the promoter could no longer plead ignorance. I was sometimes stepping over the line, if not during the show, then afterwards. In fact, I was getting away with murder. Good job I was funny."

His autobiography, A Comedian’s Tale was published in 1995 and revised for Kindle in 2013. He described it as "the best book about comedy I have ever writ".

Cognito was a father of two, Ollie Barbieri (JJ Jones in the teen drama Skins) and writer Will Barbieri.

== Death ==
While performing on 11 April 2019 at the Lone Wolf comedy club in Bicester, Cognito suffered an aortic dissection and collapsed during his set. Cognito had joked about having a stroke a few minutes earlier, 'imagine having a stroke and waking up speaking Welsh', so this was initially thought to be a part of the act. Emergency services were called and he was pronounced dead at the scene.

After his death tributes came from across the comedy community, including Jimmy Carr, Matt Lucas, Katy Brand, Mark Steel, Shappi Khorsandi and Arthur Smith.

== See also ==
- Entertainers who died during a performance
