= The Marriage Ref (British TV series) =

ITV comedy panel game

- Genre: Comedy panel game
- Created by: Jerry Seinfeld
- Directed by: Jim Hickey; Gemma Rawcliffe; Barbara Wiltshire
- Presented by: Dermot O'Leary
- Voices of: Simon Greenall
- Theme music composer: Mat Osman
- Country of origin: United Kingdom
- Original language: English
- No. of series: 1
- No. of episodes: 7

Production
- Executive producers: Ruth Phillips; Richard Osman
- Producers: Karen Murdoch; Sam Eastall; Jim Hickey; Gemma Rawcliffe; Russell Balkind; Sam Pinnell
- Editors: Dan Mellow; Steve Andrews
- Running time: 60 minutes (inc. adverts)
- Production company: Zeppotron

Original release
- Network: ITV
- Release: 18 June – 30 July 2011

Related
- The Marriage Ref

The Marriage Ref is a comedy panel game that aired on ITV from 18 June to 30 July 2011 and is hosted by Dermot O'Leary.

== Format ==
Three couples share their argument with the host and celebrity guests. After hearing both sides of the argument, each celebrity guest considers the strength and viability of the information presented, weighing in with their opinion. In the end, while the host may be swayed by the opinions of the celebrity guests, he is free to make his own to determine who is the victor in the debate.

== Panellists ==
Show	Celebrities	Original air date
1	Sarah Millican, Jimmy Carr and Geri Halliwell	18 June 2011
2	Sarah Millican, Jack Dee and Will Young	25 June 2011
3	Jimmy Carr, James Corden and Lorraine Kelly	2 July 2011
4	Sarah Millican, Jack Whitehall and Eamonn Holmes	9 July 2011
5	Jack Dee, Jimmy Carr and Katherine Kelly	16 July 2011
6	Jack Dee, Jonathan Ross and Joanna Page	23 July 2011
7	Sarah Millican, Denise van Outen and Micky Flanagan	30 July 2011
