= Distraction (game show) =

British television game show

- Created by: David Taylor
- Written by: Frankie Boyle; Jim Muir; Phil Tredinnick
- Presented by: Jimmy Carr
- Country of origin: United Kingdom
- Original language: English
- No. of series: 2
- No. of episodes: 16

Production
- Running time: 30 minutes (inc. adverts)
- Production company: Talkback

Original release
- Network: Channel 4
- Release: 31 October 2003 – 11 June 2004

Distraction is a game show that aired on Channel 4 in the United Kingdom from 31 October 2003 to 11 June 2004. Presented by comedian Jimmy Carr, the show involved contestants answering questions while being distracted in various bizarre, painful and humiliating ways.

Carr was aided by "distractors", who as the name suggests, attempted to distract the contestants painfully or emotionally. Examples include losing contestants, nudists, creepy carny guys, tattoo/piercing experts, wrestlers, midgets, Roller Derby girls, professional athletes, paintball players, and a large bouncer-type male nicknamed "Tiny". Occasionally, a number of female assistants helped with some of the distractions; depending on the stunt being played, they could be referred to as "Jimmy's interns", "farmer girls", "schoolgirls" or "ammo ladies."

A quiz book, featuring most of the distractions seen on the show, was released by Carlton Books in late 2004.

== Gameplay ==
Four contestants, usually two women and two men, compete through three rounds in each episode. Before the first round, they learn about each other's embarrassing moments, unique hobbies, strange talents, or previous unflattering occupations through questions asked by Carr. Throughout the game, Carr asks relatively simple questions that the contestants must answer while enduring various uncomfortable, painful, and/or unsettling distractions. These distractions may be inflicted throughout the round, activated by a contestant in order to answer, or as the result of a right/wrong answer. At the end of each round, the contestant with the lowest score is eliminated from the game and leaves with nothing.

Typical distractions include:

- Having to urinate in a specially designed toilet in order to buzz-in
- Placing something disgusting in one's own mouth, such as a snail or a raw lamb testicle, after each correct answer
- Being shot with a paintball gun for each wrong answer, or whenever the opponent answers correctly, while wearing no protective equipment except a crash helmet and face shield
- Being continuously body-slammed onto a thick cushioned mat by professional wrestlers
- Being shocked with an electric dog collar upon buzzing-in
- Being placed in an upside-down position and tickled on the soles of one's bare feet (UK, Italy and India only)
- (Round 1 only) A self-inflicted distraction such as attaching clothespins to one's own face, with bonus points awarded to the most successful contestant at the end of the round

The last remaining contestant wins the game, advances to the fourth and final round, and wins either a car, a set of prizes, or a cash bonus. However, they must answer several further questions to prevent the cash or prizes from being damaged or destroyed. If the prize is a car, each missed question results in a part of it being damaged by an audience member or one of the losing contestants (smashing the windscreen, dumping paint on the seats, etc.). When a group of prizes is at stake, each miss results in one of them being destroyed, such as by being blown up or hit with a wrecking ball. In the case of a cash prize, the winner must answer questions quickly enough to prevent its destruction (such as notes being burned in a line of toasters or coins thrown into a full cement mixer), or must throw some of it onto a fire for each incorrect answer. At the end of the round, the contestant takes home the car, prizes, or cash regardless of condition.

== Transmissions ==
Series	Start date	End date	Episodes
1	31 October 2003	19 December 2003	8
2	16 April 2004	11 June 2004	8

== International versions ==
Country	Name	Host	Channel	Premiere	Finale
Brazil	Distração Fatal	Rodrigo Faro	RecordTV	20 December 2008	
Canada (French)	Distraction	Pierre-Yves Lord	V	2 September 2009	
Czech Republic	Pekelná výzva	Iva Pazderková	Prima COOL	14 February 2013	
Greece	Distraction	Ilias Psinakis and Elena Graveza; Thanasis Viskadourakis	Alpha TV	16 May 2006	
India	V Distraction	Rithvik Dhanjani	Channel V	February 2015	
India (Bengali)	Bhyabachaka	Biswanath Basu; RJ Sayan	Star Jalsha	3 May 2015	
Israel	בהפרעה; Behafraa	Ido Rosenblum	Bip	2007	
Italy	Distraction	Teo Mammucari; Enrico Papi	Italia 1	21 March 2006	26 November 2007
Lithuania	Stresas	Andrius Rožickas	TV3	2007	
Netherlands	Rat van Fortuin	Ruben Nicolai	Nederland 3 (BNN)	15 September 2006	31 December 2007
Paraguay	Distracción	Álvaro Mora	Telefuturo	4 February 2009	
Serbia	Distrekšn	Dragan Marinković	RTV Pink	21 February 2010	
Spain	Distracción fatal	Anabel Alonso	Antena 3	2007	
Uruguay	Distracción	Orlando Petinatti	Saeta TV	2006	
United States	Distraction	Jimmy Carr	Comedy Central	18 January 2005	11 April 2006
