= Bring Me the Head of Light Entertainment =

- Genre: Comedy
- Created by: Lee Hurst
- Presented by: Graham Norton; Seán Cullen
- Country of origin: United Kingdom
- Original language: English
- No. of series: 5

Production
- Running time: 30 minutes (inc. adverts)
- Production companies: Anglia in association with United Film and Television Productions

Original release
- Network: Channel 5
- Release: 3 April 1997 – 1 November 2000

Bring Me the Head of Light Entertainment is a comedy panel game show that aired on Channel 5 from 3 April 1997 to 1 November 2000. It was hosted by Graham Norton during the first three seasons, with Seán Cullen replacing him for the final two seasons.
