= Telly Addicts =

British television game show (1985–1998)

- Genre: Game show
- Presented by: Noel Edmonds
- Starring: Charles Collingwood (1994–1996)
- Voices of: Maria McErlane (1997–1998)
- Country of origin: United Kingdom
- Original language: English
- No. of series: 13
- No. of episodes: 229

Production
- Production location: Pebble Mill Studios
- Running time: 30 minutes
- Production companies: BBC Pebble Mill (1985–1996); BBC Birmingham in association with Unique Television (1997–1998)

Original release
- Network: BBC1
- Release: 3 September 1985 – 29 July 1998

Related
- Show Me the Telly; As Seen on TV; In With A Shout

Telly Addicts is a British television game show hosted by Noel Edmonds that aired on BBC One from 3 September 1985 to 29 July 1998. All questions were based on television programmes past and present, and generally took the form of a short clip being shown followed by a series of questions either specifically about the clip or more generally about the programme from which it had been taken. Two teams of four players sat opposite each other on sofas. The final series in 1998 had three teams of two players instead of two teams of four players.

== Formats ==
=== 1985–1986 ===
The original format had two teams of four people with a winner-stays-on format. The challengers had to try to beat the champions to win and return as the champions in the next show, whilst the champions were simply playing to retain their title. This backfired somewhat after a single family, the Pain family, managed to last almost the entire series.

=== 1987–1996 ===
The format changed to a tournament format, (most likely because of the aforementioned single family in the first series). It involved 16 teams in eight qualifying heats. The eight winning teams of the qualifying heats would go on into the quarter-finals; the four winning teams of the quarter-finals would go into the semi-finals; the two winning teams of the semi-finals would proceed to the grand final, and the winning team of the grand final became the champions. After the main series, it was quite normal for the series winners to return to take part in a special game, usually broadcast over Christmas, where they would go up against a team of celebrities. Until 1993 teams continued to be feature families. From 1994 teams were linked into family or friendship with names named from television shows or

=== 1997–1998 ===
There was no series in 1997. The show returned in 1998 with a massive revamp with new rounds and rules. Instead of two teams of four players, there were now three teams of two players and the tournament format was dropped. These changes were first seen in a special Christmas celebrity edition in 1997 before a full series commenced the following year and before finally ending for good on 29 July 1998.

=== Rounds in the 1998 version ===
- TV Clip: Each team was given a classic television clip and had to answer 3 questions related to the clip with one point for each correct answer.
- The Beginners Guide: Someone who worked on a classic television show (e.g. a writer or actor), was asked what would be the 10 best things that summed up the programme. Each team had 60 seconds to guess as many as they could, scoring a point for each.
- In The Box: A mystery celebrity was concealed inside a multi-coloured box and answering general knowledge television questions correctly allowed for a small panel to be opened. Each question was worth one point, with three points for managing to correctly guess the mystery celebrity. If a team got the celebrity guess wrong, they were frozen out for the rest of the round. Following the reveal, the celebrity guest would ask a bonus question in return for a small prize, such as a board game. After this round, the team with the fewest points was eliminated.
- The Pyramid: The two remaining teams were shown four categories associated with television, and each team picked one of them to answer questions about. One player from each team then stood inside a pyramid structure and was asked quickfire questions on their chosen category with one point for each correct answer.
- World TV: Teams were shown a small film documenting the kind of television shown in a foreign country (e.g. Spain, New Zealand) and then took in turns answering questions on what they saw. One point for a correct answer but incorrect answers saw the question passed onto the opposition.
- Raiders of the Lost Archive: Taking in turns, the teams selected a category from a grid of nine and were asked a question from it, either worth 1, 3 or 5 points. The lowest scoring team after this game was eliminated.
- Stairway of the Stars: The last remaining team were given a series of clues related to a celebrity, by moving onto their name space on the stairway, if they were right, the questions continued but if it was wrong, an alarm sounded and they had to return to the level they were on. The team had 60 seconds to get to the top, if they did, they won a holiday, which had some loose connection to the World TV round but if they failed, they would instead win a widescreen television each, but they would also have to suffer the indignity of finding out the star prize they missed out on.

== Series Winners ==
=== Series ===
Year	Winners
1985	Pain Family
1986	Reynish Family
1987	Bustard Family
1988	Mainwaring Family
1989	Rossiter Family
1990	Bone Family
1991	Gardiner Family
1992	Payne Family
1993	Brown Family
1994	Warriors Gate
1995	Golden Girls
1996	Press Gang
1997	No Tournament Held
1998	No Tournament Held

=== Champion Telly Addicts ===
Year	Winners
1995	Rossiter Family

== Spin offs ==
The Telly Addicts format was re-used in 2002 for the UK subscription television channel Challenge (which had repeated some series of Telly Addicts prior to this) in the form of quiz shows Soap Addicts, hosted by Malandra Burrows and Richard Arnold. However, the programme was not recommissioned after its 2003 series. Sport Addicts also existed and was hosted by Bradley Walsh and Celebrity Addicts was hosted by Lisa Rogers and Richard Arnold. Soap Addicts was when teams had to answer questions about famous soaps with clips and pictures. Sport Addicts also followed this but with teams answering questions about sports with clips and pictures and Celebrity Addicts was teams answering questions about celebrities with clips and pictures.

In 2021, Paul Sinha's TV Showdown debuted on ITV, which is described as an updated version of Telly Addicts. The programme licenses the Telly Addicts format from owners Unique Television.

== Games ==
Waddingtons produced two board game editions of "Telly Addicts" in 1989 and 1992 respectively. Three Interactive DVDs based on the Telly Addicts show were produced, featuring original presenter Noel Edmonds. The first was released in Autumn 2005, the second in Autumn 2006 and the third in Autumn 2007.

A Telly Addicts video game for Nintendo DS, Nintendo Wii, PSP and PS2 was published by Ubisoft on 9 November 2007.

A Telly Addicts app was also released for iOS in 2012, published by Island Wall Entertainment. The app has since been delisted.

== Transmissions ==
=== Series ===
Series	Start date	End date	Episodes	Presenter
1	3 September 1985	17 December 1985	16	Noel Edmonds
2	9 September 1986	9 December 1986	14	Noel Edmonds
3	12 September 1987	19 December 1987	15	Noel Edmonds
4	30 August 1988	6 December 1988	15	Noel Edmonds
5	4 September 1989	11 December 1989	15	Noel Edmonds
6	3 September 1990	10 December 1990	15	Noel Edmonds
7	2 September 1991	9 December 1991	15	Noel Edmonds
8	8 September 1992	15 December 1992	15	Noel Edmonds
9	6 September 1993	13 December 1993	15	Noel Edmonds
10	12 September 1994	19 December 1994	15	Noel Edmonds
11	4 September 1995	11 December 1995	15	Noel Edmonds
12	2 September 1996	16 December 1996	15	Noel Edmonds
13	2 March 1998	29 July 1998	16	Noel Edmonds

=== Champion Telly Addicts ===
One off series as part of show's 10th anniversary featuring former series champions competing.

Start date	End date	Episodes	Presenter
9 January 1995	27 February 1995	8	Noel Edmonds

=== Specials ===
Date	Entitle	Presenter
24 December 1985	Christmas Special	Noel Edmonds
6 September 1986	EastEnders meets Howard's Way	Noel Edmonds
16 December 1986	1985 Champions vs 1986 Champions	Noel Edmonds
23 December 1986	Christmas Special	Noel Edmonds
26 December 1987	1986 Champions vs 1987 Champions	Noel Edmonds
29 December 1987	Christmas Special	Noel Edmonds
13 December 1988	1987 Champions vs 1988 Champions	Noel Edmonds
23 December 1988	Christmas Special	Noel Edmonds
18 December 1989	1989 Champions vs TV Stars	Noel Edmonds
24 December 1989	Christmas Special	Noel Edmonds
17 December 1990	1990 Champions vs TV Stars	Noel Edmonds
29 December 1990	Christmas Special	Noel Edmonds
16 December 1991	1991 Champions vs TV Stars	Noel Edmonds
26 December 1991	Christmas Special (BBC vs ITV)	Noel Edmonds
22 December 1992	Teenagers Special	Noel Edmonds
28 December 1992	Christmas Special (Boys vs Girls)	Noel Edmonds
20 December 1993	1993 Champions vs TV Stars	Noel Edmonds
29 December 1993	Christmas Special	Noel Edmonds
5 September 1994	Ten Years of Telly Addicts	Noel Edmonds
28 December 1994	Christmas Special	Noel Edmonds
18 December 1995	1995 Champions vs TV Stars	Noel Edmonds
28 December 1995	Christmas Special	Noel Edmonds
4 November 1996	BBC TV 60th Anniversary Special	Noel Edmonds
23 December 1996	EastEnders vs Emmerdale	Noel Edmonds
29 December 1997	Christmas Special	Noel Edmonds

== International versions ==
Telly Addicts was adapted twice for the French market. Allume la télé! was an adaptation of the original format. Les Cinglés de la télé was based on the 1998 format.

Country/language	Local title	Host	Channel	Date aired/premiered
France	Allume la télé ! ("Turn on the telly!")	Bernard Montiel and Annie Pujol (season 1); Ivan Frésard and Annie Pujol (season 2)	TF1	30 March 1996
France	Les Cinglés de la télé ("Telly Freaks")	Gérard Holtz	France 2	4 April 1999
