= Fear Factor (British game show) =

- Also known as: Celebrity Fear Factor (2004)
- Genre: Game show
- Presented by: Ed Sanders
- Country of origin: United Kingdom
- Original language: English
- No. of series: 3
- No. of episodes: 32

Production
- Running time: 60 minutes (inc. adverts)
- Production company: Endemol UK Productions

Original release
- Network: Sky One
- Release: 3 September 2002 – 22 August 2004

Related
- Fear Factor

Fear Factor (also known as Fear Factor UK) is a British game show based on the Dutch game show Now or Neverland and part of the international Fear Factor franchise. It was broadcast on Sky One from 3 September 2002 to 22 August 2004 and was presented by Ed Sanders.

== Format ==
As the show started, Sanders gives an opening statement, and this is one most commonly used:

Imagine a world where your greatest fears become reality. Welcome to Fear Factor.

Then, he gives a verbal disclaimer. The wording has changed with certain versions, but also, this is one most commonly used:

The stunts you're about to see are designed and supervised by trained professionals. They are extremely dangerous, and they should not be attempted by anyone, anywhere, anytime.

This version has two teams of three contestants: the red team and the green team. They all take part individually in the first stunt, chosen randomly by Ed. In the second stunt, two contestants from each team, chosen by their opponents, attempt the stunt. The number of team members who participate in the final round, and whether they attempt it individually or together, varies based on the stunt.

When the first stunt is non-competitive, then everyone who successfully completes it banks their team £3,000; when it is competitive, then the four contestants from any team with the fastest time bank their team £3,000. In the second stunt, the contestants who complete a stunt bank their teams £3,000. And in the third and final stunt, the person from any team, or the team that complete a stunt in the fastest time bank their teams £5,000 and win the total money.

For its third and final series, the programme became Celebrity Fear Factor, with each team now consisting of three celebrities playing for charity.

== Filming ==
The first series was filmed in Cape Town, South Africa, while the 2nd & 3rd series was filmed in Buenos Aires, Argentina.

== Transmissions ==
| Series | Start date | End date | Episodes |
|---|---|---|---|
| 1 | 3 September 2002 | 26 November 2002 | 13 |
| 2 | 18 September 2003 | 11 December 2003 | 13 |
| 3 | 18 July 2004 | 22 August 2004 | 6 |
