= International King of Sports =

- Genre: Sports
- Presented by: Helen Chamberlain; Alan Parry; Mark Robson
- Country of origin: United Kingdom
- Original language: English

Production
- Production company: Endemol UK Productions

Original release
- Network: Five
- Release: 15 September 2002 – September 2004

International King of Sports is an annual televised multi-sport competition. The events are mostly sports rarely undertaken outside of this competition, and often resemble comic variants of standard track and field sports.

Adam Horder (Australia) was the winner in 2002. The winner of the 2004 competition was Jamie Quarry (Great Britain).

The television programme of International King of Sports was produced by Endemol, and in the UK was broadcast on Five. It was presented by Helen Chamberlain and Mark Robson, with commentary from Alan Parry.

The programme won a bronze award in the Game Show category at the Montreux Television Festival in 2003.
