= Incognito (game show) =

- Genre: Game show
- Presented by: Peter Smith
- Country of origin: United Kingdom
- Original language: English
- No. of series: 2
- No. of episodes: 82

Production
- Running time: 25 minutes
- Production companies: Cactus TV and BBC North

Original release
- Network: BBC1
- Release: 25 October 1995 – 10 January 1997

Incognito is a British game show that aired on BBC1 from 25 October 1995 to 10 January 1997. It was hosted by Peter Smith.

== Gameplay ==
In each edition, three contestants competed against each other for the chance to move on to the next round of the series, with the overall winner at the end of the series winning a major holiday.

The contestants were shown a 'wheel of letters' and the answers to the questions or the crossword style clues were right in front of them on the wheel, there were three different wheels:

- Quiz Wheel – Where the contestants answered general knowledge questions.
- Puzzle Wheel – The contestants were asked crossword style clues.
- Word Wheel – This was a solo round where each contestant had thirty seconds to spot as many words on the wheel then spell them.

The final round was a series of quiz wheels and puzzle wheels, but this time a contestant could lose ten points for giving a wrong answer. This round was played until a time up siren sounded, meaning it was the end of the game.

The contestant with the most points was the winner and moved to the next round of the programme, while the losing contestants went home with a dictionary and an Incognito polo shirt.

== Transmissions ==
| Series | Start date | End date | Episodes |
|---|---|---|---|
| 1 | 25 October 1995 | 1 December 1995 | 27 |
| 2 | 8 October 1996 | 10 January 1997 | 55 |
