= Don't Forget the Lyrics! (British game show) =

- Genre: Game show
- Based on: Don't Forget the Lyrics! by Jeff Apploff
- Presented by: Shane Richie
- Country of origin: United Kingdom
- Original language: English
- No. of series: 2
- No. of episodes: 38 (including 2 specials)

Production
- Running time: 60 minutes (including adverts)
- Production company: RDF Television

Original release
- Network: Sky1
- Release: 11 May 2008 – 9 August 2009

Related
- Don't Forget the Lyrics!

Don't Forget the Lyrics! is a British television game show based on the American format of the same name. Produced by RDF Television, the programme was broadcast on Sky1 between 11 May 2008 and 9 August 2009 and was presented by Shane Richie. Contestants attempted to correctly recall missing song lyrics in order to win cash prizes of up to £250,000.

== Format ==
Each episode featured a single contestant progressing through a series of songs of increasing difficulty and prize value. After successfully completing each song, the contestant could choose to continue playing or leave the game with their accumulated winnings. An incorrect answer before reaching the guaranteed level resulted in the contestant leaving with no prize; after that point, winnings were reduced to the guaranteed sum.

Contestants who successfully completed nine songs were offered a final challenge for the jackpot. This involved correctly completing the lyrics of a song that had reached the top ten of the UK Singles Chart. Success at this stage won the £250,000 top prize.

The programme featured a live studio band led by Jess Bailey.

== Gameplay ==
At the start of the game, the contestant selected from nine musical categories. Each category offered a choice of two songs, from which one was selected. Once chosen, the band performed the song while the lyrics appeared on screen in a karaoke-style format. At a designated point, the music and lyrics stopped, leaving blank spaces which the contestant was required to complete from memory.

In the early stages, contestants were required to supply only a small number of missing words. As the game progressed, the number of missing words increased, with later rounds requiring twelve or more correct words. After singing the missing lyrics, the contestant could either lock in their answer, use a backup, or walk away with their current winnings (except on the opening round).

If the contestant locked in their answer, the lyrics were revealed on screen. Correct lyrics were highlighted in green and incorrect lyrics in red. Before reaching the guaranteed level, any incorrect answer resulted in the contestant leaving with no prize. After reaching the guaranteed sum, an incorrect answer reduced the contestant’s winnings to that level.

=== Prize structure ===
Song/line number	Prize value
1	£500
2	£1,000
3	£2,500
4	£5,000 (guaranteed)
5	£7,500
6	£10,000
7	£20,000
8	£50,000
9	£125,000
10	£250,000

=== Backups ===
Contestants were provided with three forms of assistance, known as backups, each of which could be used once per game up to and including the £125,000 round:

- Backup singers – allowed one of two friends or family members to assist by singing the song again with the contestant.
- 2 Words – revealed two selected missing words; if an incorrect word was chosen, it was automatically corrected.
- 3 Lines – displayed three possible lyric options, one of which was correct.

Backups could not be used on the final £250,000 challenge. Any unused backups were required to be used during the £125,000 round.

=== Correct lyrics ===
If a contestant selected a song that was a cover version, the lyrics deemed correct were those from the version used on the programme.

Lyrics were verified by multiple independent sources, and the production team’s decision was final. Contestants were permitted to contest decisions after filming, although reversals were rare.

== Winners ==
=== £125,000 winners ===
- Helen Norgrove (24 January 2009)
- Joe Connors (26 April 2009)

The £250,000 jackpot was never won, as no contestant progressed to attempt the final song.

== Broadcast ==
The series was produced by RDF Television for Sky One and aired between 11 May 2008 and 9 August 2009. A total of 36 regular episodes were broadcast across two series, along with two celebrity Christmas specials.

=== Series overview ===
Series	Start date	End date	Episodes
1	11 May 2008	27 July 2008	12
2	17 January 2009	9 August 2009	24

=== Specials ===
Date	Title
22 December 2008	Celebrity Christmas Special – Part 1
23 December 2008	Celebrity Christmas Special – Part 2

== Trivia ==
The largest prize won on the programme was £125,000, achieved on two occasions. No contestant ever attempted the £250,000 jackpot song, and the series concluded without a jackpot winner.
