= Defectors (game show) =

British TV game show

- Presented by: Richard Orford
- Country of origin: United Kingdom
- No. of series: 2
- No. of episodes: 60

Production
- Running time: 30 mins (including advertisements)
- Production company: Flextech

Original release
- Network: Challenge TV
- Release: 11 June 2001 – 5 July 2002

Defectors is a Challenge TV game show that aired from 11 June 2001 to 5 July 2002 and is hosted by Richard Orford. The series was produced in-house by Flextech and distributed worldwide by Minotaur International.

The format was that the audience would vote on which contestant they thought would get a question right, and the percentage of votes would determine possible scores for subsequent questions. Both the winning contestant and the audience member who made the most correct guesses would win £1,000.

Challenge TV occasionally repeat the series in early hours slots, however, as episodes 1–12 of the first series are longer than other episodes, they are too long to fit into their schedule and as such no longer are repeated.

Separate from the game in the show itself but as part of an episode's broadcast, viewers at home could push the red button on their Sky television remote control during episodes to access an interactive section where they could win prizes.

UKGameshows.com were generally favourable for the series, saying that compared to Challenge TV's attempts at game shows when it was known as The Family Channel, Defectors is a "qualified success for the new grown-up Challenge TV". They added Defectors has "got an original format, an excellent host, good if not perfect production values and quite an entertaining 40 minutes all said and done."

== Transmissions ==
Series	Start date	End date	Episodes
1	11 June 2001	20 July 2001	30
2	27 May 2002	5 July 2002	30
