= Absolute Cobblers =

1999 British game show

- Presented by: Sean Meo; Wynnie La Freak
- Country of origin: United Kingdom
- No. of series: 1

Production
- Running time: 30mins (inc comms)

Original release
- Network: Challenge TV
- Release: 4 October 1999 – 1999

Absolute Cobblers is a British game show that aired in 1999 on Challenge TV. It was hosted by Sean Meo and Wynnie La Freak. The show ran for one series and was based on an Australian format.

== Format ==
The host would read a statement, and the panellists had to decide whether it was true or 'absolute cobblers' (meaning false, or nonsense). The question was then put to the studio audience, who had the chance to win prizes by answering correctly.
