= One Hundred and Eighty =

British darts game show from 2015

- Genre: Darts game show
- Presented by: Davina McCall; Freddie Flintoff
- Starring: Russ Bray (Referee)
- Voices of: Rod Studd
- Country of origin: United Kingdom
- No. of series: 1
- No. of episodes: 8

Production
- Running time: 60 minutes (inc. adverts)
- Production company: ITV Studios

Original release
- Network: Sky 1
- Release: 15 September – 22 October 2015

Related
- Bullseye

One Hundred and Eighty is a British darts game show that aired on Sky 1 from 15 September to 22 October 2015 and was hosted by Davina McCall. Russ Bray served as onstage referee, while Freddie Flintoff and Rod Studd provided commentary from a backstage control booth.

The title is taken from the call made by darts referees when a player attains the maximum possible score of 180 in a single turn, by hitting the treble-20 scoring area with all three throws.

== Background ==
The show was filmed at Winter Gardens, Blackpool. On each episode, two professional darts players partnered with amateurs in order to win money for the latter.

Professionals featured on the show included Gary Anderson, Stephen Bunting, Adrian Lewis, Phil Taylor, Michael van Gerwen, James Wade, and Peter Wright.

== Format ==
At the start of each episode, the professionals are given 90 seconds to hit as many of the double scoring areas on a standard dartboard as possible, in ascending order starting with 1. The players alternate turns, with three throws per turn, and the clock starts when the double-1 is hit; each player must retrieve their darts before the other can throw. Every double hit adds £1,000 to the day's jackpot, for a potential maximum of £20,000. Each professional then teams up with an amateur player and two of their friends or family members; the professionals do not take part in the first three rounds described below.

=== The Race ===
Each team has a zig-zagging vertical line of 20 small targets. The host asks quick-fire questions for 45 seconds, open to all on the buzzer. A correct answer lights one target on that team's side, starting from the bottom, while a miss lights one for the opponents. Each team then has 45 seconds to throw darts and continue working upward through their unlit targets, starting with the team that lit more of them in the question round. The team that moves further up the board scores 10 points. If the round ends in a tie, both teams receive 10 points.

=== The Zone ===
Four triangular targets are used, decreasing in size from the bottom of the board to the top and worth 30, 50, 80, and 100 points. Each team begins with 180 points and must count down to zero. The host asks a toss-up question open to all; a correct answer lights the 30-point target and gives that team a chance to answer up to three more questions, ascending a level for each. After any correct answer, the team may choose to throw rather than take another question, having three attempts to hit the highest value reached and deduct it from their total. A team must throw upon reaching either the 100-point level or a level greater than or equal to their current total, whichever comes first. A wrong answer at any point gives the opponents a chance to steal the question and take control. The first team to reach zero wins the round and scores 10 points.

=== Stop the Clock ===
One team has up to 60 seconds to answer five questions correctly, and may pass as often as desired. After they do so or time runs out, the opponents have the same amount of time to hit a circular ring of 12 small targets, starting with the topmost one and working clockwise. The teams then switch roles; the one that progresses further around the ring scores 10 points. Both teams score in the event of a tie.

=== Pro Legs ===
After each of the three rounds described above, the professionals face one another in a standard game of darts; the first to count down from 501 to zero wins, scoring 10 points for their team, and a double is required for the final checkout. A team earns a bonus of £500 or £1,000 for a score of 180 or a nine-dart finish by their professional, respectively. The team keeps these bonuses regardless of the final outcome of the game.

=== Doubles Decider ===
The amateur and professional on each team now pair up for a doubles game, following the same rules and bonuses as the Pro Legs. Each team's accrued points are deducted from their starting total of 501, and the amateurs throw first in every rotation, followed by the professionals. The first team to reach zero advances to the Final Throw.

=== The Final Throw ===
The two darts players on the winning team face a board divided into nine sectors of decreasing size, each corresponding to a successively higher percentage of the jackpot. The target is marked with two rings, with the outer wider than the inner. The professional has two minutes to hit the inner rings on as many sectors in sequence as possible, starting with the lowest value and working clockwise, and may only throw three darts at a time. The clock stops when either the professional has hit all nine sectors, or when the amateur calls for them to stop. The amateur then has the remaining time to hit the outer rings of the sectors hit by the professional, in ascending order; once time runs out, they win the value of the last sector hit.

Sectors Hit	% of Jackpot
1	2.5%
2	5%
3	10%
4	15%
5	20%
6	30%
7	40%
8	50%
9	100%
