= Cleverdicks =

British television series

- Genre: Game show
- Presented by: Ann Widdecombe
- Theme music composer: Ty Unwin
- Country of origin: United Kingdom
- Original language: English
- No. of series: 1
- No. of episodes: 30

Production
- Production location: Sky Campus
- Running time: 60 minutes (inc. adverts)
- Production company: Splash Media

Original release
- Network: Sky Atlantic
- Release: 27 February – 6 April 2012

Cleverdicks was a British game show for Sky Atlantic, hosted by Ann Widdecombe. Four contestants competed in each episode for the right to call themselves "cleverdicks" and play for a roll-over cash jackpot. As explained by Widdecombe at the beginning of the first episode, a cleverdick is a person who is "irritatingly and ostentatiously knowledgeable or intelligent." The question material was therefore primarily academic in nature.

The show deliberately features Britain's top quiz players, including former contestants on other quiz shows. The first edition featured future 'Egghead' Steve Cooke and future 'Brain of Britain' David Stainer. The first established cleverdick was Rob Hannah, who reached the final several times and beat several other top quiz players including Alan Gibbs (who also was in a team that won), Nic Mortimer (the youngest contestant of the series) and Brian Pendreigh (who was in the news after Eggheads a few weeks before - which his team won).

== Gameplay ==
The game is played in four rounds, with one contestant being eliminated after each of the first three.

=== Round 1 ===
Each contestant plays this round alone and is given two minutes to identify a series of subjects, each with five clues of decreasing difficulty. They may offer one guess after each clue; a correct answer on the first clue earns five points, with the value decreasing by one point for each additional clue. The contestant may say "move on" after any clue to discard the current subject and begin a new one. If a clue is being read when time runs out, the contestant is not given a chance to guess. After all four contestants have played, the one with the lowest score is eliminated.

=== Round 2 ===
The three remaining contestants' scores are reset to zero at the start of this round. Up to five clues to a subject are revealed, one at a time, and contestants must buzz-in to answer. A correct response scores points as in Round 1 and gives the contestant the first chance to answer three related questions for one point each. Any missed questions are offered on the buzzer for the opponents. After eight subjects and question sets, the lowest scorer is eliminated.

=== Round 3 ===
The high scorer from Round 2 decides who will begin this round. The host asks one question at a time to each contestant in turn; a miss or failure to answer adds a triangle to that contestant's side of the board, starting from the bottom and stacking up, while a correct answer removes a triangle as long as the side is not empty. As the round continues, a white line slowly descends from the top of the board. The first contestant whose stack is touched by the line loses the game, while their opponent earns the title of "Cleverdick," the right to return on the next episode, and a chance to play for the jackpot in the final round.

=== Round 4 ===
Triangles marked with questions in various categories drop onto the board to form a stack, with a new one appearing every six seconds. At any given moment, the contestant may answer only the question on the bottommost triangle. A correct answer drops the triangle out of the stack and shifts all others down by one position. The contestant may move off the current question only by answering it correctly or by using a "drop" to remove it from the stack; the latter option may be used twice during the round.

The stack can hold a maximum of eight triangles before passing a white line at the top of the board. If the contestant can keep the stack under the line for a total of two minutes, they win a cash jackpot that starts at £1,000 and increases by £1,000 for every day it goes unclaimed.
