= TV Scrabble =

British game show

- Starring: Toby Anstis; Eamonn Holmes
- Country of origin: United Kingdom
- No. of series: 3

Production
- Running time: 30 mins (inc. adverts)
- Production companies: Talent TV; Flextech

Original release
- Network: Challenge TV
- Release: 1 October 2001 – 2003

TV Scrabble is a British television version of the board game, which aired on Challenge TV from 2001 to 2003. The series was produced by Talent TV for Flextech, and distributed worldwide by Minotaur International except in North America.

== Premise ==
Four players compete in two games on each show. Two players play each game facing each other one on one, with the winners playing in the daily final at the end of the show. Each game consists of two rounds.

== Duplicate Scrabble ==
In this round, the players are given the same seven tiles and have 20 seconds (25 seconds in series 2) to create a word. The higher-scoring word remains on the board. This gameplay is repeated five times.

== Speed Scrabble ==
Each player is given a clean board and has to formulate as many words as possible in one minute.

== Daily Final ==
The winner of the first game competes against the winner of the second game in a Speed Scrabble round, with both players sharing the same board. Control of the board alternates every 30 seconds for two minutes. The players' scores are added to the scores from their earlier rounds, with the highest overall score winning the day's game.

The four winners from Monday to Thursday episodes compete in the Friday Final. The weeks' winners continue to Finals Week, with the overall winner being awarded a holiday.
