= Perfect Match (British game show) =

British dating game show (2001–2003)

- Genre: Dating game show
- Voices of: Ken Lorimer
- Country of origin: United Kingdom
- Original language: English
- No. of series: 3

Production
- Running time: 60 minutes (inc. adverts)
- Production company: RDF Television

Original release
- Network: Channel 4
- Release: 18 September 2001 – 4 September 2003

Perfect Match is a dating game show that aired on Channel 4 from 18 September 2001 to 4 September 2003 and was narrated by Ken Lorimer.
