= Andy Goldstein =

British radio and television presenter

Andy Cornelius Goldstein (born 11th June 1973) is a British television presenter and radio broadcaster currently working for Talksport. He has presented Soccer AM on Saturday mornings, replacing Tim Lovejoy (having also previously taken over from him as co-host on Soccer AM's All Sports Show) in 2004. The All-Sports show ended in 2007. Goldstein is also a former presenter of Eurosport's Home Nations Snooker tournaments. He previously presented Sky Sports coverage of Premier League Snooker, 9-Ball Pool (including the Mosconi Cup) and 10 pin bowling Weber Cup.

Goldstein currently hosts Drive, a radio show which runs on Talksport from Monday to Friday 4-7, having previously hosted The Sports Bar 10 pm to 1 am every Monday night. The show initially broadcast on Sunday nights before being broadcast Monday to Thursday. Following George Galloway's departure from the station, it was increased to 4 nights per week.

In 2006, Goldstein presented UKTV G2's coverage of the 2006 FIFA World Cup in Germany.

Goldstein erroneously reported that Talksport DJ and former Chelsea defender Jason Cundy had died after he failed to turn up to present his weekend show in October 2008. This led to some Chelsea fans laying flowers at Stamford Bridge and sending in condolences to the radio station. Goldstein later said he was only joking. On 3 August, Goldstein accused a Twitter account belonging to Rio Ferdinand as being fake. Shortly after, Rio Ferdinand rang the show to prove himself, hence forcing Goldstein to apologise. In August 2016, Goldstein mistakenly contacted a parody Twitter account of footballer Carlton Cole in an attempt to organise an interview with Cole himself. The account of Cole responded to his messages by quoting the lyrics to The Killers song Mr Brightside. He was also a childhood friend of Snooker player Ronnie O'Sullivan and the pair worked together as presenter and pundit on Eurosport's snooker tournaments. He also worked on Manchester United TV and is a Manchester United supporter.

Goldstein is a regular guest on the Chatabix podcast, hosted by comedians Joe Wilkinson and David Earl.

On 20 August 2024, Goldstein took on Ralf Souquet as a wildcard amateur in the opening round of the 2024 U.S. Open Pool Championship in Atlantic City, New Jersey, losing the match 9—0. Afterwards, Goldstein thanked promoter Barry Hearn for allowing him to play in the tournament, describing it as 'one of the most incredible unbelievable experiences of my life'.

On 5 August 2025, Goldstein took part in the Florida Pool Open, facing Earl Strickland in the first round. Strickland dominated the 'race to 9 round', although Goldstein managed to win a frame.
