= Dave Pressler =

American artist

- Known for: Illustration; Character Design; Animation; CGI; Painting; Sculpture
- Spouse: Lisa Henson
- Website: davepresslerart.com

Dave Pressler is an American illustrator, animator, sculptor, character designer and painter based in Los Angeles. Much of his work focuses on whimsical portrayals of robots and strange, fantastical creatures. He is perhaps best known for his Emmy-nominated, short-lived Nickelodeon series Robot and Monster, which he created and produced with Joshua Sternin and Jennifer Ventimilia.

== Career ==
Pressler's career in entertainment first started in his twenties after moving to Los Angeles. The first characters he designed were "Gak & Flem," a duo of characters Dave created with Dan Clark to interview celebrities with on the red-carpet. After that, Dave secured a position as a character developer at The Jim Henson Company. Along with partners Dan Clark and Don Asher, Dave (the trio forming Wandering Monkey Entertainment) became a key production / character designer for shows like Los Luchadores and Brats of the Lost Nebula, which TV Guide rated as The Best Children's Show of 1998. He has also developed shows and worlds for networks such as Kids' WB, Nelvana, Disney XD, Fox Kids Network and Wild Brain, among others. Dave was the creature designer, co-producer and co-star of the indie-horror film The Item. The film was the first digital feature to be accepted to Sundance Film Festival. Dave went on to create the distinctive visual design for the Emmy-nominated CGI children's adventure show for TLC, The Save-Ums!.

Some of Dave's most cherished work has been his sculpting, and he has enjoyed success as a highly sought-after sculptor of vinyl collectibles. His handiwork has been immortalized as Necessaries Toy Foundation's Mark Ryden's YHWH, Camille Rose Garcia's "Camille's Girls," The Ron English "Rabbbit" figure, Brendon Monroe's "Sour" for Android 8, Nathan Jurevicius "Monkey King", and Luke Chueh's "Black in White". With the success of Dave's various limited edition resin creations his character "Angry Clobber Monkey" has become his first vinyl collectable character.

In the Summer of 2014, DreamWorksTV, the YouTube channel of DreamWorks Animation, premiered Dave's new series of stop-motion short videos How To Do Everything! With Garrick & Marvin. The project marks Dave's first endeavor into stop-motion animation.

Throughout 2017, Pressler served as the Art Director for "The Boss Baby: Back in Business," for DreamWorks Animation Television. Taking place after the film, the series will follow Boss Baby, and his big brother Tim, as they navigate around the world of BabyCorp. It is being released by Netflix in 2018.

In August 2018, he will have a career retrospective exhibition at Museum of Art History in Lancaster, CA.

On January 29, 2021, a new project by Pressler for Disney Television Animation, under the title Planet Puppies was registered.

== Personal life ==
In 2014, Pressler announced he would be going to space thanks to Virgin Galactic. He is married to Lisa Henson, CEO of The Jim Henson Company.
