= Remake =

New version of a film or TV series

A remake is a film, television series, video game, song or similar form of entertainment that is based upon and retells the story of an earlier production in the same medium—e.g., a "new version of an existing film". A remake tells the same story as the original but uses a different set of casts, and may use actors from the original, alter the theme, or change the flow and setting of the story. In addition, since a remake is released some time after the original work, it may incorporate new technologies, enhancements, and techniques that had not existed or been commonly used when the original work was created. Similar but not synonymous terms are reimagining or reboot, which indicates a greater discrepancy between a work and the work it is based on.

== Film ==
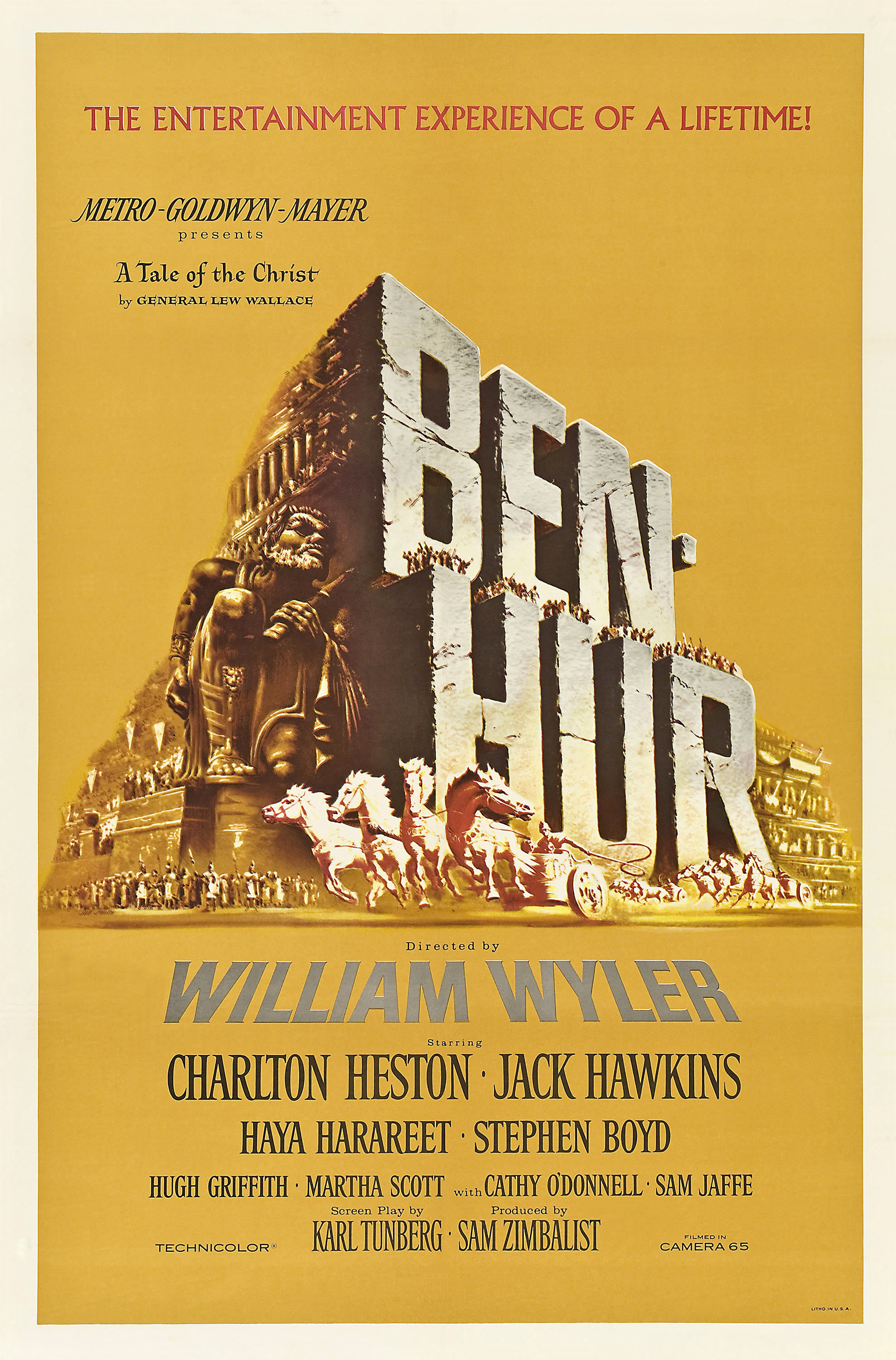
Ben-Hur (1959) is a remake of the 1925 silent film Ben-Hur: A Tale of the Christ

A film remake uses an earlier film as its main source material, rather than returning to the earlier film's source material. The 2001 film Ocean's Eleven is a remake of 1960's Ocean's 11, while 1989's Batman is a re-interpretation of the comic book source material which also inspired 1966's Batman. In 1998, Gus Van Sant produced an almost shot-for-shot remake of Alfred Hitchcock's 1960 film Psycho. The 2025 film Snow White is a live-action remake of the animated 1937 film Snow White and the Seven Dwarfs.

With the exception of shot-for-shot remakes, most remakes make significant changes in character, plot, genre, and theme. For example, the 1968 film The Thomas Crown Affair is centered on a bank robbery, while its 1999 remake involves the theft of a valuable painting. The 1999 remake of The Mummy was viewed primarily as a "reimagining" in a different genre (adventure).

Similarly, when the 1969 film The Italian Job was remade in 2003, few aspects were carried over. Another example is the 1932 film Scarface which was remade in 1983 starring Al Pacino; the 1932 version is about the illegal alcohol trade, while the characters in the 1983 version are cocaine smugglers.

Sometimes a remake is made by the same director. For example, Yasujirō Ozu's black-and-white A Story of Floating Weeds was remade into the color Floating Weeds. Hitchcock remade his 1934 black-and-white The Man Who Knew Too Much in color in 1956. Tick Tock Tuckered, released in 1944, was a color remake of Porky's Badtime Story, released in 1937 with Daffy Duck in Gabby Goat's role. Cecil B. DeMille managed the same thing with his 1956 remake of his silent 1923 film The Ten Commandments. Sam Raimi directed Evil Dead II in 1987, a quasi-remake of his 1981 film The Evil Dead, blending original elements with an emphasis on comedy. In 2007, Michael Haneke' remake Funny Games, was an English-language remake of his original German-language Funny Games (which is also an example of a shot-for-shot remake), while Martin Campbell, director of the miniseries Edge of Darkness, directed the 2010 film adaptation.

Not all remakes use the same title as the previously released version; the 1966 film Walk, Don't Run, for example, is a remake of the World War II comedy The More the Merrier. This is particularly true for films that are remade from films produced in another language such as Point of No Return (from the French La Femme Nikita), Vanilla Sky (from the Spanish Abre los ojos), The Magnificent Seven (from the Japanese Seven Samurai), A Fistful of Dollars (from the Japanese Yojimbo), The Departed (from Hong Kong's Infernal Affairs), Secret in Their Eyes (from the Argentine El secreto de sus ojos), Let Me In (from the Swedish Let the Right One In or Låt den rätte komma in), and The Ring (from the Japanese Ring).

Remakes are rarely sequels to the original film. In this situation, essentially the remake repeats the same basic story of the original film and may even use the same title, but also contains notable plot and storyline elements indicating the two films are set in "the same universe". An example of this type of remake is the 2000 film version of Shaft, which was the second film adaptation of the original novel but was also a canon storyline sequel to the original 1971 film adaptation. The 2013 remake of Evil Dead was also a storyline sequel, featuring a post-credits cameo from Ash Williams.

The Italian film Perfect Strangers (Perfetti sconosciuti; 2016) was included in the Guinness World Records as it became the most remade film in cinema history, with a total of 18 versions of the film.

== Television ==
Remakes occur less often on television than in film, because television mostly favours the concept of "reviving" a series instead, but some remakes have happened from time to time, especially in the early 21st century. Examples include Battlestar Galactica (2003), He-Man and the Masters of the Universe (2002), Nikita (2010), V (2009), Hawaii Five-0 (2010), and Charlie's Angels (2011).

One area where television remakes are particularly common is remaking British shows for the American market or, less frequently, American shows for the British market. For example, Three's Company is an American remake of the British Man About the House: not only was the original show re-created (with very few characters or situation changes initially), but both series had spin-offs based on the Ropers (in the United Kingdom, George and Mildred, in the United States, The Ropers), and both series were eventually re-tooled into series based on the male lead (in the United Kingdom, Robin's Nest, in the United States, Three's a Crowd). The British sitcom Till Death Us Do Part inspired the American All in the Family, while All in the Family's spin-off Maude was remade in the United Kingdom as Nobody's Perfect.

Another example is the long-running American sitcom The Office (2005–2013), which was a remake of the 2001 BBC sitcom of the same name. The American version's pilot episode followed its British counterpart "nearly verbatim", though later episodes had their own unique plot after the pilot was received poorly by critics and audiences. The American television show The Killing is an investigative crime drama based on the Danish series Forbrydelsen.

== Video games ==
In some cases, only models and environments are remade, while retaining the game's original code. Remakes are produced for the purpose of modernizing a game for newer hardware and new audiences. Typically, a remake of such game software shares its title, fundamental gameplay concepts, and core story elements with the original. With the advent of such notable video game remakes such as Resident Evil 2 in 2019 (followed by Resident Evil 3 in 2020) and Final Fantasy VII Remake in 2020, these strict notions are being called into question and brought into a broader perspective. This can even be seen as early as 2004 with the release of Metal Gear Solid: The Twin Snakes as that title features newer gameplay additions and voice acting.

Remakes are often made by the original developer or copyright holder, although some are made by the fan community. If created by the community, video game remakes are sometimes also called fan games and can be seen as part of the retro gaming phenomenon.

== See also ==
- List of British television series based on American television series
- List of English-language films with previous foreign-language film versions
- Cover versions of songs
- Retelling
