= Anatomy of Murder =

2015 video game

- Developer: DM Financial Services
- Publisher: DM Financial Services
- Director: Darren McNamara
- Producer: Darren McNamara
- Designer: Darren McNamara
- Release: 2015
- Genres: Whodunnit, Transreality gaming

Anatomy of Murder is a 2015 Australian whodunnit - video game and is the debut work of Darren McNamara's company DM Financial Services. According to McNamara, it is the first free-to-play online murder mystery game.

== Production ==
=== Conception ===
The game was developed by DM Financial Services, a company focusing on producing original and engaging online gaming content. Led by online gaming entrepreneur Darren McNamara, Anatomy of Murder was the result of over 13 years of extensive R&D. McNamara faced considerable resistance from the entertainment industry regarding the format, the production values, and for spending too much money. In addition, he received feedback from a network that they wanted to be involved in commissioning a series from the ground up rather than being shown a finished pilot they didn't order. He chose to go ahead and create the game because he felt it showed how much he believed in the concept more than a "4 page glossy". He originally received few knockbacks from TV executives In 2013, so he instead went outside the box and approached audiences directly.

In October 2013, TV Tonight readers were asked to participate in an online focus group for the game, in order to provide McNamara with some feedback on his pitch. He was keen to see the concept being picked up in the Australian market before trying to sell it to the United States. In addition he hoped to take the format to MIPTV in April 2014. Anatomy of Murder was released two years later in 2015.

=== Design ===
The game's narrative was conveyed through two produced episodes at 45 minutes each. A third episode was also produced which revealed the killer and the clues in detail. McNamara designed the format, produced the 3 episodes and built the website himself. Due to the lack of budget, McNamara was not able to improve the script, the production and the trailer to his standards. All of the information required to solve the murder was contained within those two episodes, as well as information at the game's website. A cash prize of AU$250,000 was made available to the first player able to solve the crime. The game could be played from phones, tablets or desktop computers. Players had to choose from nine possible killers and ten potential motives. According to McNamara, it is notable for being the first free-to-play online murder mystery game; he believes in the game's uniqueness as the format has been registered with FRAPA since 2007, and he has not come across any TV shows or DVD/website/SMS games similar to Anatomy of Murder. The prize amount was changed to $100,000 some time during its development. The winner was to be announced on Christmas Day 2016. A series of 20 clues were released onto the website leading up to that date.

=== Future ===
As of April 2015, Anatomy of Murder 2 is in the works. Then in October 2016, the sequel was set to start production in April 2017, with website members offered an audition. McNamara hoped to up the budget for this series in order to improve the quality. His goal was to produce two to three series a year, with the story arcing across the whole season or between seasons. While only one person would win the major prize, there would be smaller additional prizes along the way.
