= David Lyle =

Australian television producer

David Lyle (1950-2017) was an Australian television executive known for his work producing reality and unscripted television.

== Career ==
Lyle was originally from Sydney, Australia. During his early life, Lyle received degrees in geology and geophysics. He worked as an exploration geologist and taught high school chemistry before entering the television industry. He began working as a television writer at Network 10 and the Australian Broadcasting Corporation, before becoming an executive producer for Nine Network in 1988. At Nine, he became head of development and acquisitions, and was part of a team of executives that largely ran the network. He is known for launching local versions of series such as Who Wants to Be a Millionaire?. In the 1980s, Lyle also hosted The Golden Years of Television with his friend Virginia Bell, who later became a High Court Justice.

He later moved to London where he worked for Pearson plc.

Lyle moved to Los Angeles in 2001, after taking up a post as the head of FremantleMedia North America. He was in charge of Fremantle until 2004, during which time he was involved in the launch of American Idol. He ran the Fox Reality Channel from 2005 until 2010 when the channel was rebranded into Nat Geo Wild. At Fox Reality, he spearheaded shows like My Bare Lady, and Seducing City. He subsequently served as head of National Geographic Channels until 2014 where he produced series such as Wicked Tuna and Life Below Zero.

Lyle was an advocate for the rights of television production workers. He frequently commented on the importance of television formats to modern television, and the need to safeguard them from intellectual property theft. He was chairman of PACT US, a trade organization for production companies, which merged with the Non-Fiction Producers Association under his leadership in 2015. He also co-founded the Format Recognition and Protection Association in 2000, which he also chaired.

Lyle was an advocate for the rights of television production workers. He frequently commented on the importance of television formats to modern television, and the need to safeguard them from intellectual property theft. He was chairman of PACT US, a trade organization for production companies, which merged with the Non-Fiction Producers Association under his leadership in 2015. He also cofounded the Format Recognition and Protection Association in 2000, which he also chaired.

== Personal life ==
Lyle had three children. His wife Janne Dennehy. He died due to cancer at his Los Angeles home on September 21, 2017.

== Foundation ==
In 2019, the nonprofit David Lyle Foundation was established to provide employment and career advancement opportunities in the television industry. It was backed by a consortium of organizations including C21Media, Essential Media Communications, and RealScreen.
