= TV format =

Overall concept and branding of a copyrighted television show

A TV format is the overall concept and branding of a copyrighted television show. The most common type of formats are those in the television genres of game shows and reality shows, though other genres (e.g., sitcoms) are also adapted. TV formats may be viewed as a form of intellectual property (IP), and are regularly bought and sold, though TV formats are not generally protected under copyright law.

== Description ==
A TV format is the overall concept and branding of a copyrighted television show. A format is licensed by TV networks, so that they may produce a version of the show tailored to their nationality and audience. Formats are a major part of the international television market. Format purchasing is popular with broadcasters, due principally to the lower risk associated with an already-proven idea and the preference of audiences to watch programming tailored to their locality.

=== Examples ===
The most common type of formats are those in the television genres of game shows and reality shows, many of which are remade in multiple markets with local contestants. Examples include Survivor, Who Wants to Be a Millionaire?, Pop Idol and Big Brother that have all proven successful worldwide. Such types of formats are also known as franchises, since rights to the format are usually handled with licenses.

Particular models in the genre of sitcoms are often sold as formats, enabling broadcasters to adapt them to the perceived tastes of their own audience. An example is The Office, a BBC sitcom which got adapted as The Office in the United States, Kontoret in Sweden, HaMisrad in Israel, Le Bureau in France, The Office in India, Stromberg in Germany, La Job in Quebec, Canada and La Ofis in Chile.

== Companies ==
Leading companies that handle the creation and sales of programming formats include Warner Bros. International Television Production, ITV Studios, Talpa, Endemol Shine and Fremantle.

== Legal issues ==
TV formats are viewed as a form of intellectual property (IP), and are regularly bought and sold by TV producers, distribution company and broadcasters. For example, Who Wants to Be a Millionaire? has been recreated in 108 territories, while local versions of Idol have aired (over 129 series) in 42 territories receiving about three billion votes, most notable being American Idol.

However, TV formats are not generally protected under copyright law. As a result, copycat formats are sometimes created, which seek to duplicate the success of an original format without paying the person who came up with it. Format developers seek to prevent this by various means, including the use of trademarks or withholding distribution of other shows. Establishing "Proof of Review" and exposure to companies reviewing new TV formats is one important aspect of protection by the industry at the Television Writers Vault. The Format Recognition and Protection Association (FRAPA) aims to protect rights to formats and lobbies for legal protection.

== See also ==
- List of American television series based on British television series
- List of British television series based on American television series
- Radio format
