= Tina Dalton =

Australian television presenter and documentary filmmaker (1964 or 1965–2026)

- Born: Bettina Dalton; 1964 or 1965; Bli Bli, Queensland, Australia
- Died: 24 August 2026 (aged 61); Sunshine Coast, Queensland, Australia
- Education: University of Queensland
- Occupations: Filmmaker; television presenter
- Known for: Producing wildlife and nature documentaries
- Television: Bush Beat, Getaway

Bettina Dalton (1964 or 1965 – 24 August 2026) was an Australian television presenter and documentary filmmaker. Dalton is arguably best known for being part of the original line-up of presenters on the Nine Network’s travel program Getaway when it debuted in 1992. However, Dalton produced and directed numerous wildlife and nature documentaries throughout her career.

== Life and career ==
Dalton was born in Bli Bli, Queensland. After graduating from the University of Queensland in 1981 with an Associate Diploma in Wilderness Reserves and Wildlife, Dalton commenced her career as a ranger with the Queensland Parks and Wildlife Service in 1982. She founded the service's media unit the following year, which was used to produce natural science segments for children’s television.

In 1983, Dalton worked with David Attenborough on his series The Living Planet.

After making her first on-screen appearance as "Ranger Tina" in the Mark Lewis film Cane Toads: An Unnatural History in 1988, Dalton produced and presented 45 episodes of children's wildlife series Bush Beat.

While she was producing wildlife stories for the Nine Network breakfast show Today, producer David Lyle offered her the job as being one of the original reporters on the network's fledgling travel show Getaway. Dalton stayed with the show until the end of 1995, but returned for a special appearance in 2023.

Throughout her career, she produced and directed an array of documentaries for international broadcasters including the BBC, PBS, National Geographic and the Discovery Channel. In 2010, Dalton co-founded production company Wild Fury with Veronica Fury. In 2014, Wild Fury was merged with Bearcage Productions to become Wildbear Entertainment.

Dalton died on the Sunshine Coast on 24 August 2026, at the age of 61.

== Awards ==
In December 2004, Dalton was awarded the University of Queensland's Gatton Gold Medal in recognition of her contribution to natural sciences. Dalton became the first female recipient of the medal, despite it having been awarded since 1984.

A documentary Dalton produced called Playing with Sharks: The Valerie Taylor Story was a joint-winner of the Audience Award at the 2021 Sun Valley Film Festival and received the Jennifer Bryceland Award at the Lighthouse International Film Festival. It was also recognised for the Best Use of Footage in a Factual or Natural World Production at the 2022 FOCAL International Awards. It was also nominated for Best Documentary at the 2021 AACTA Awards.

In 2024, Dalton and Rachel Ward won Best Documentary Feature at the Film Critics Circle of Australian Awards for Rachel’s Farm.
