= List of American television series based on British television series =

Many successful British television shows (particularly sitcoms and reality shows) have been remade for the American market. The amount of reworking varies, with some shows (such as All in the Family) keeping the basic situation and then adding many original features, while others have taken complete scripts verbatim (such as Amanda's).

There are relatively few examples of American shows remade for the British market (the majority of these being game shows), and the British television audience are very accepting of the American originals while being much less accepting of British remakes (for instance, the failure of The Brighton Belles, the British remake of The Golden Girls). The American remakes have sometimes been imported back into the United Kingdom. By contrast, original British programmes are rarely seen on the major American networks in modern times (in the 1960s the airing of British-produced programs such as The Avengers and Fireball XL5 on American network TV occurred frequently) and are usually broadcast only on the Public Broadcasting Service and on cable television, especially BBC America, with only a few purely British shows having gained mainstream popularity in the United States. This list includes a number of pilots not subsequently made into series.

British original	American remake	Notes
The 1900 House	Frontier House	Reality. Frontier House broadcast in the United Kingdom on Channel 4.
Absolutely Fabulous	AbFab	Two pilots attempts, one by Roseanne Barr, another by Jennifer Saunders (who created the British version). Both were passed over.
Agony	The Lucie Arnaz Show	
Airline	Airline	British version renamed Airline UK in the United States.
Ant & Dec's Gameshow Marathon	Gameshow Marathon	Game show.
Ant & Dec's Saturday Night Takeaway	Best Time Ever with Neil Patrick Harris	
Antiques Roadshow	Antiques Roadshow	Reality.
Are You Being Served?	Beane's of Boston	Comedy. Unaired pilot.
As If	As If	American remake canceled after two episodes on UPN.
Bad Education	An American Education	Unaired pilot for ABC.
Balls of Steel	Balls of Steel	
Ballykissangel	Hope Island	
Being Human	Being Human	Sci-fi drama on Syfy.
Benidorm	The Big Package	Yet to air as of 2026.
Big Star's Little Star	Big Star Little Star	
Birds of a Feather	Stand by Your Man	
Blackpool	Viva Laughlin	American remake canceled after two episodes.
Brat Camp	Brat Camp USA	
Broadchurch	Gracepoint	Crime drama. Cancelled after one season.
Cannonball	Cannonball	
Cash Cab	Cash Cab	Game show.
Cash in the Attic	Cash in the Attic	Reality.
CD:UK	CD USA	
Celebrity Fit Club	Celebrity Fit Club	Reality competition. Both versions featured former US Marine Harvey Walden IV.
Celebrity Gogglebox	Celebrity Watch Party	American version was broadcast in the United Kingdom as Celebrity Gogglebox USA.
Changing Rooms	Trading Spaces	Reality.
The Chase	The Chase	Game show. Until 2021, the American version only used one Chaser, Mark Labbett (a.k.a. "The Beast"), who was brought over from the United Kingdom to participate.
The Circle	The Circle	American version known in the United Kingdom as The Circle US.
Cold Feet	Cold Feet	
Cracker	Cracker	American remake is known as Fitz in the United Kingdom.
Coupling	Coupling	Comedy. American remake was canceled after four episodes.
Cuckoo	Cuckoo	Sitcom. NBC ordered a pilot in 2013.
Dad's Army	The Rear Guard	Pilot episode only.
Dancing on Ice	Skating with Celebrities	Reality.
Dear John	Dear John	Known as Dear John USA in the United Kingdom.
Distraction	Distraction	Game show. Same host (Jimmy Carr).
Doc Martin	Best Medicine	Comedy drama
Dog Eat Dog	Dog Eat Dog	Game show. American version hosted by Brooke Burns.
Don't Forget Your Toothbrush	Don't Forget Your Toothbrush	Game show. American edition aired on Comedy Central and was hosted by actor Mark Curry.
Eleventh Hour	Eleventh Hour	Drama.
Ex on the Beach	Ex on the Beach	Reality.
The Fall and Rise of Reginald Perrin	Reggie	
Farmer Wants a Wife	Farmer Wants a Wife	
Fawlty Towers	Chateau Snavely	Comedy. Pilot episode only with Harvey Korman and Betty White.
Fawlty Towers	Amanda's	Starring Beatrice Arthur.
Fawlty Towers	Payne	Starring John Larroquette.
For the Love of Ada	A Touch of Grace	American sitcom starring Shirley Booth.
Footballers' Wives	Football Wives	Drama. Confirmed pilot.
Four Weddings	Four Weddings	Reality, British original is known as Four Weddings UK.
Free Agents	Free Agents	Comedy starring Hank Azaria. American remake was cancelled after four episodes.
Friday Night Dinner	Dinner with the Parents	Sitcom. American version was released on Freevee after three previous failed attempts.
Gavin & Stacey	Us & Them	Comedy.
George and Mildred	The Ropers	Comedy.
Getting On	Getting On	Sitcom. After a successful pilot episode, HBO ordered a six-episode run in 2013, with a second season airing in 2014.
Ghosts	Ghosts	Sitcom.
Gogglebox	The People's Couch	Observational documentary picked up by Bravo. First aired in 2013.
The Great British Bake Off	The Great American Baking Show	British version known in the United States as The Great British Baking Show.
The Grimleys	The Grubbs	
Have I Got News for You	Have I Got News for You	Comedy where celebrity contestants answer questions based on the week's top news stories. American version is based on the long running British show of the same name.
Hell's Kitchen	Hell's Kitchen	Reality competition. American version was broadcast in the United Kingdom as Hell's Kitchen USA on ITV2. Gordon Ramsay appears in both series.
Hit Me Baby One More Time	Hit Me Baby One More Time	Same host (Vernon Kay).
Holding the Baby	Holding the Baby	
Home to Roost	You Again?	Elizabeth Bennett appears in both versions.
Honey, We're Killing the Kids	Honey We're Killing the Kids	
House of Cards	House of Cards	Same premise, though British version was a short series.
How Clean Is Your House?	Kim and Aggie Clean Up America	
Hunted	Hunted	
I'd Do Anything	I'd Do Anything	George Gray hosted American version on ESPN, his third American version of a British show.
I'm a Celebrity...Get Me Out of Here!	I'm a Celebrity...Get Me Out of Here!	Reality.
The Inbetweeners	The Inbetweeners	Comedy. Cancelled after one series.
Inside	Inside: USA	Reality show. Initially premiered on YouTube, then moved to Netflix.
The IT Crowd	The IT Crowd	Pilot canceled in 2008.
It's Me or the Dog	It's Me or the Dog	
The Jeremy Kyle Show	The Jeremy Kyle Show	Chat show. American version ended in 2013 after two seasons.
Junior MasterChef	MasterChef Junior	
Just for Laughs	Just for Laughs Gags	American version was a repackaged version of the Canadian version.
Keep it in the Family	Too Close for Comfort	Final season of American version initially aired as The Ted Knight Show.
The Krypton Factor	The Krypton Factor	
A League of Their Own	Game On!	American version retitled to avoid confusion with the 1992 movie of the same name.
Life on Mars	Life on Mars	Sci-fi drama.
Little Britain	Little Britain USA	Comedy. A full series was made and gained popularity after various repeats. HBO ordered more, but makers and stars David Walliams and Matt Lucas declined.
Love Island	Love Island	Reality.
Love Thy Neighbour	Love Thy Neighbor	
Mad Dogs	Mad Dogs	Drama/Thriller. Remake that reused one of the original British actors (Ben Chaplin).
Man About the House	Three's Company	Comedy.
MasterChef	MasterChef USA	
MasterChef	MasterChef	Reality.
Match of the Day	Match of the Day	
Max Headroom	Max Headroom	Sci-fi.
Men Behaving Badly	Men Behaving Badly	Comedy series. Aired for two seasons on NBC.
The Million Pound Drop	Million Dollar Money Drop	Game show. The American remake was cancelled in 2011.
The Million Pound Hoax	$25 Million Dollar Hoax	
Mind Your Language	What a Country!	
Miranda	Call Me Kat	
Mistresses	Mistresses	Drama series.
Mr. Men and Little Miss	The Mr. Men Show	
Never Mind the Buzzcocks	Never Mind the Buzzcocks	
Not the Nine O'Clock News	Not Necessarily the News	The Daily Show, especially in its earlier incarnation under Craig Kilborn, also owes a great deal to this show.
The Office	The Office	Comedy. American version is broadcast in the United Kingdom as The Office: An American Workplace, The Office USA, or The US Office.
On the Buses	Lotsa Luck	
One Foot in the Grave	Cosby	Many differences.
Outnumbered	Outnumbered	Picked up by Fox.
Pop Idol	American Idol	Reality competition. Simon Cowell was a judge on both versions.
Porridge	On the Rocks	
Prime Suspect	Prime Suspect	
Pulling	Pulling	Pilot with creative input from Sharon Horgan.
Pyjama Party	Pajama Party	Same presenter (Katie Puckrik).
Queer as Folk	Queer as Folk	Drama.
Ramsay's Kitchen Nightmares	Kitchen Nightmares	Reality. Both versions feature Gordon Ramsay as host. American version broadcast in the United Kingdom on Channel 4 as Ramsay's Kitchen Nightmares USA.
Red Dwarf	Red Dwarf USA	Two un-aired pilots. The second pilot is titled Red Dwarf USA.
Robin's Nest	Three's a Crowd	Comedy.
Robot Wars	Robot Wars: Extreme Warriors	Robot Wars: Extreme Warriors was filmed alongside the British show in 2001 and 2002.
Robot Wars	Nickelodeon Robot Wars	
Scrapheap Challenge	Junkyard Wars	Scrapheap and Junkyard have gone head-to-head in transatlantic challenges in the United Kingdom.
The Secret Millionaire	Secret Millionaire	
Shameless	Shameless	American version starring William H. Macy.
Sirens	Sirens	Comedy drama. Cancelled after two seasons by USA Network.
The Sketch Show	The Sketch Show	American version featured Kelsey Grammer.
Skins	Skins	Ran for one season only in 2011. British version shown on BBC America.
Small Fortune	Small Fortune	American version hosted by Lil Rel Howery. American version shown on NBC.
Spaced	Spaced	Only a pilot episode was made.
Spitting Image	D.C. Follies	Loose adaptation.
Spotless	Keep It Spotless	Competition.
Spy	Spy	Situation comedy. ABC ordered a remake in 2013.
Steptoe and Son	Sanford and Son	Comedy. Relied on race as well as class.
Strictly Come Dancing	Dancing with the Stars	Reality competition. Former British judges Len Goodman and Bruno Tonioli are also judges on Dancing with the Stars.
Supernanny	Supernanny	Reality. British episodes were shown along with American episodes. Same host (Jo Frost).
Taskmaster	Taskmaster	
Teachers	Teachers	Canceled after six episodes.
That Was the Week That Was	That Was the Week That Was	Satire. Both versions hosted by David Frost.
The Thick of It	The Thick of It	Unaired pilot made for ABC.
The Thick of It	Veep	HBO series produced by Armando Iannucci and the same team of writers as the British version.
This Country	Welcome to Flatch	
This Life	First Years	
Till Death Us Do Part	All in the Family	Comedy. Coincidentally, the All in the Family spin-off Maude was remade in the United Kingdom as Nobody's Perfect, and the Maude spin-off Good Times was remade as The Fosters. None of the British series were connected to each other or to Till Death Us Do Part.
Time Team	Time Team America	
Tugs	Salty's Lighthouse	
Top Gear	Top Gear	Reality.
Top Gear	Top Gear America	
Top of the Pops	Top of the Pops	Sometimes aired performances recorded by its BBC counterpart. Aired as part of CBS Late Night.
Touching Evil	Touching Evil	Drama.
Trigger Happy TV	Trigger Happy TV	Dom Joly appears in both versions of the show, despite the American version having a mostly new cast; Joly was the only on-screen star in the British version. The American version is known as Trigger Happy USA when aired in the United Kingdom.
Trisha Goddard	The Trisha Goddard Show	Chat show. American version ended in 2014 after two seasons.
Two's Company	The Two of Us	Comedy.
Undercover Boss	Undercover Boss	Reality.
Upstairs, Downstairs	Beacon Hill	Drama.
Utopia	Utopia	
The Vicar of Dibley	The Minister of Divine	Comedy. Pilot episode only.
The Weakest Link	Weakest Link	Game show. Anne Robinson hosted both the British version and the original American prime-time series. Subsequent American syndicated series were hosted by George Gray. Currently hosted by Jane Lynch on NBC.
What Not to Wear	What Not to Wear	Reality.
The Wheel	The Wheel	Game show. Both versions are hosted by Michael McIntyre who also created the show.
White Van Man	Family Tools	Comedy sitcom. Picked up by ABC for a full series in 2012.
Who Do You Think You Are?	Who Do You Think You Are?	
Who Wants to Be a Millionaire?	Who Wants to Be a Millionaire	Game show.
Whose Line Is It Anyway?	Whose Line Is It Anyway?	Improvisational sketch comedy. Both used panelists Wayne Brady, Ryan Stiles and Colin Mochrie, among others. Last episodes of British version were produced in the United States.
Wife Swap	Wife Swap	Reality.
Wife Swap	Trading Spouses	
Wild at Heart	Life Is Wild	American version cancelled after thirteen episodes.
The World's Strictest Parents	World's Strictest Parents	
The Worst Week of My Life	Worst Week	Comedy.
Would I Lie to You?	Would I Lie to You?	
The X Factor	The X Factor	Reality competition. Same executive producer/judge (Simon Cowell) and production company (Syco TV). Cheryl Cole was also a judge on the American version but was dropped following the audition stage. American edition was cancelled after three seasons.
The Young Ones	Oh No Not THEM!	Unsuccessful pilot; Nigel Planer was the only cast member from the original.
The Young Person's Guide to Becoming a Rock Star	My Guide to Becoming a Rock Star	

== See also ==
- List of British television series based on American television series
