= Yogi Bear (film) =

2010 film by Eric Brevig

- Theatrical release poster
- Directed by: Eric Brevig
- Written by: Brad Copeland; Joshua Sternin; Jennifer Ventimilia
- Based on: The Yogi Bear Show by William Hanna; Joseph Barbera
- Produced by: Donald De Line; Karen Rosenfelt
- Starring: Dan Aykroyd; Justin Timberlake; Anna Faris; Tom Cavanagh; T.J. Miller
- Cinematography: Peter James
- Edited by: Kent Beyda
- Music by: John Debney
- Production companies: De Line Pictures; Sunswept Entertainment; Rhythm & Hues Studios
- Distributed by: Warner Bros. Pictures
- Release dates: December 11, 2010 (Westwood); December 17, 2010 (United States)
- Running time: 80 minutes
- Country: United States
- Language: English
- Budget: $80 million
- Box office: $204 million

Yogi Bear is a 2010 American live-action/animated comedy film directed by Eric Brevig and written by Brad Copeland, Joshua Sternin and Jennifer Ventimilia. Based on the animated television series The Yogi Bear Show, the film features the voices of Dan Aykroyd and Justin Timberlake as Yogi Bear and Boo-Boo Bear, and also stars Anna Faris, Tom Cavanagh and T.J. Miller. The film centers on Yogi as he teams up with his best friend Boo-Boo, Ranger Smith, and nature documentary filmmaker Rachel Johnson to stop their home, Jellystone Park, from being logged. Production on the film took place in New Zealand in October 2008.

Yogi Bear premiered in Westwood on December 11, 2010, and was theatrically released by Warner Bros. Pictures in the United States on December 17. The film received negative reviews and grossed $204 million against an $80 million budget.

== Plot ==
Yogi Bear and Boo-Boo Bear are two talking brown bears who steal picnic baskets from campers at Franklin City's Jellystone Park. Head park ranger Smith always finds out about the incidents from his co-ranger Jones and is annoyed that Yogi refuses to act like a regular bear. Mayor R. Brown realizes that Franklin City is facing bankruptcy due to profligate spending on his part, so he plots with his chief of staff to raise money for the town budget and his upcoming gubernatorial campaign by shutting down Jellystone and opening the land to logging.

To save the park, Smith and Jones, with help from documentary filmmaker Rachel Johnson, whom Smith is instantly smitten with, hold a centennial festival and fireworks show in an attempt to sell season passes. To sabotage the event, Brown promises Jones the position of head ranger if the funds are not raised. Yogi and Boo-Boo had promised Smith to stay out of sight during the festival, but Jones convinces them otherwise. The bears try to please the crowd with a water skiing performance, but Yogi accidentally sets his cape on fire, causing fireworks to be launched into the crowd, who flee in fear.

After Jellystone is shut down, Smith is demoted by Brown to serve in the polluted and urban Evergreen Park in the city, and scolds Yogi for interfering with the festival. A dejected Yogi finally decides to act like a regular bear, but Boo-Boo gets him to come to his senses by showing him cut-down trees. Seeing that their home is in danger of being destroyed, Yogi and Boo-Boo travel to Evergreen Park, where they and Smith figure out Brown's plan; Yogi and Smith reconcile in the process. They all return to Jellystone with Rachel, where they learn that Boo-Boo's pet turtle is a rare and endangered species known as a "frog-mouthed" turtle, meaning that, according to law, the park cannot be destroyed because the turtle is living there.

Brown and his chief of staff learns about the turtle and sends Jones to kidnap it. On the day that Brown is planning a press conference to begin the destruction of the park, Smith, Rachel, and the bears rescue the turtle and try to bring it to the media's attention. Jones, learning that he had been deceived by Brown, has a change of heart and helps the team bring the turtle to the press conference. Brown has his guards steal the turtle and informs the group that he will break the law in order to achieve his goals and expresses confidence that if Smith tells the world about his crimes, that no one will believe him.

While Brown gives his speech at the press conference, the gang recall that Rachel had installed a hidden camera in Boo-Boo's bow tie for her documentary, which had captured Brown's confession. While Yogi and Boo-Boo distract the security guards, Smith hooks up the camera to the jumbotron Brown is using for his press conference and shows the video, causing the crowd to turn against him. Mayor Brown tries to deny that the confession was real, but is ultimately exposed after the turtle, having escaped from Brown's guards, reveals himself to the crowd. After Brown and his staff get into legal trouble for their crimes, Jellystone Park is reopened and becomes a great success with Smith reinstated as head ranger along with the turtle as the park's main attraction. Smith and Rachel admit their feelings for each other and embrace, while Yogi and Boo-Boo return to stealing picnic baskets.

== Cast ==
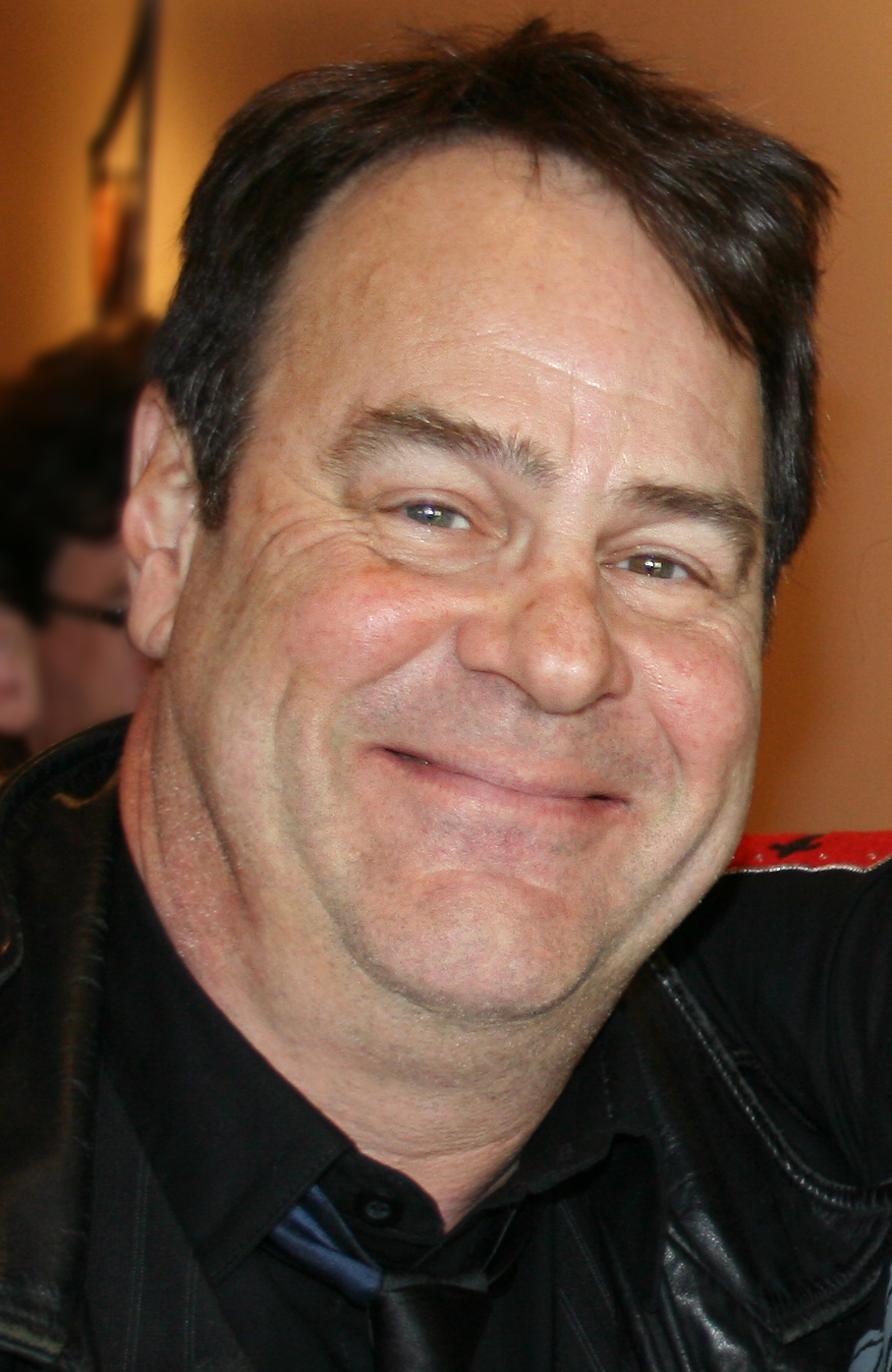
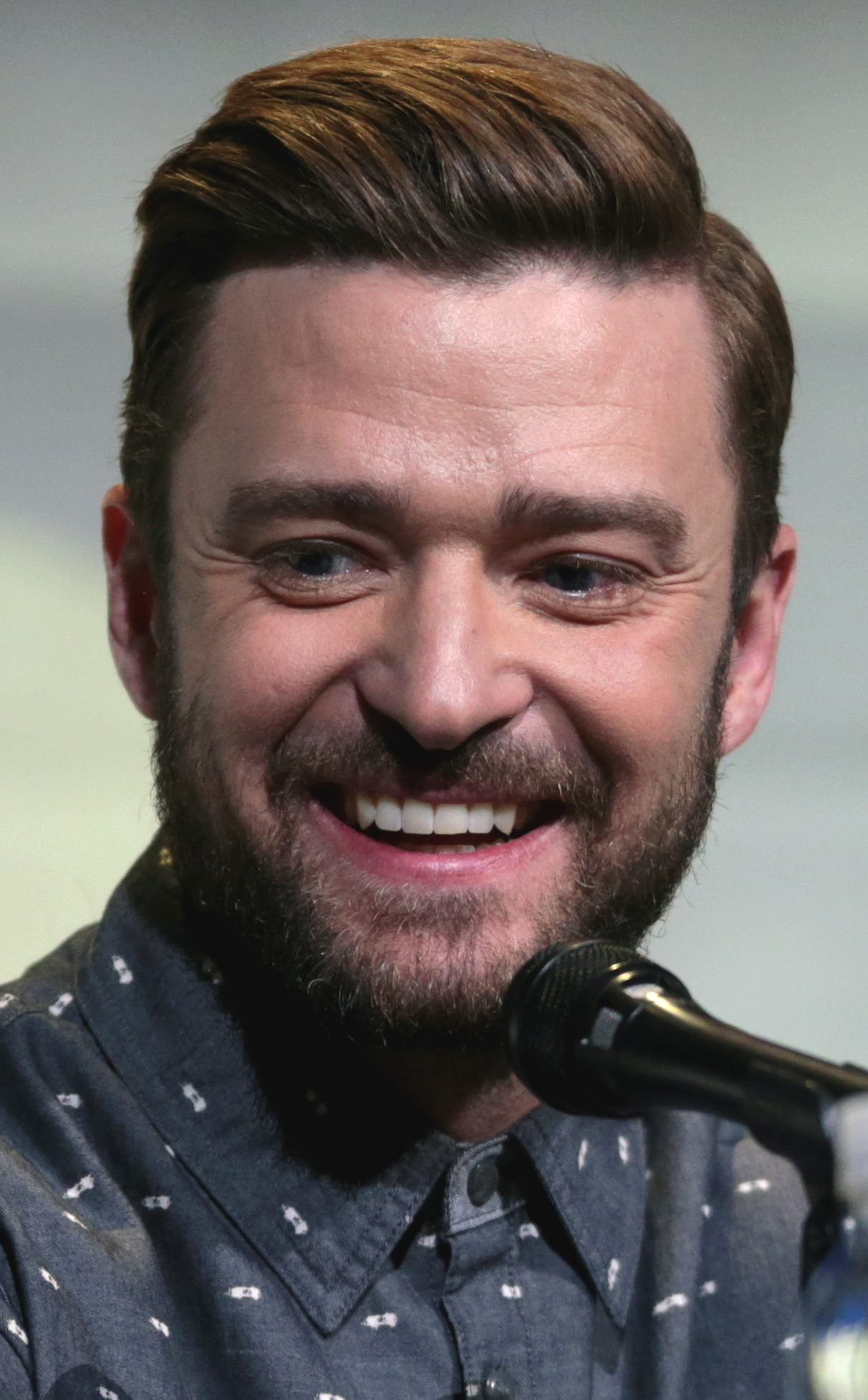
(Left-to-Right) Dan Aykroyd (pictured in 2009), and Justin Timberlake (2016) lend their voices to Yogi Bear and Boo-Boo
- Dan Aykroyd as the voice of Yogi Bear, a talking, picnic basket-stealing brown bear who lives in Jellystone Park.
- Justin Timberlake as the voice of Boo-Boo, Yogi's best friend and sometimes the voice of reason.
- Tom Cavanagh as Ranger Smith, the head ranger of the park who always catches Yogi and Boo-Boo stealing picnic baskets.
- Anna Faris as Rachel Johnson, a nature documentary filmmaker, and Ranger Smith's love interest.
- Andy Daly as Mayor R. Brown, the main antagonist of the film. He is the Mayor of Franklin City who wants to shut Jellystone Park down so that he can make money for his city and become governor.
- T.J. Miller as Ranger Jones, a park ranger who is tricked by Mayor Brown into getting Jellystone shut down, making the excuse that Jones will be the head ranger of the park.
- Nate Corddry as the chief of staff, Mayor Brown's assistant.
- Josh Robert Thompson as the narrator.

== Production ==
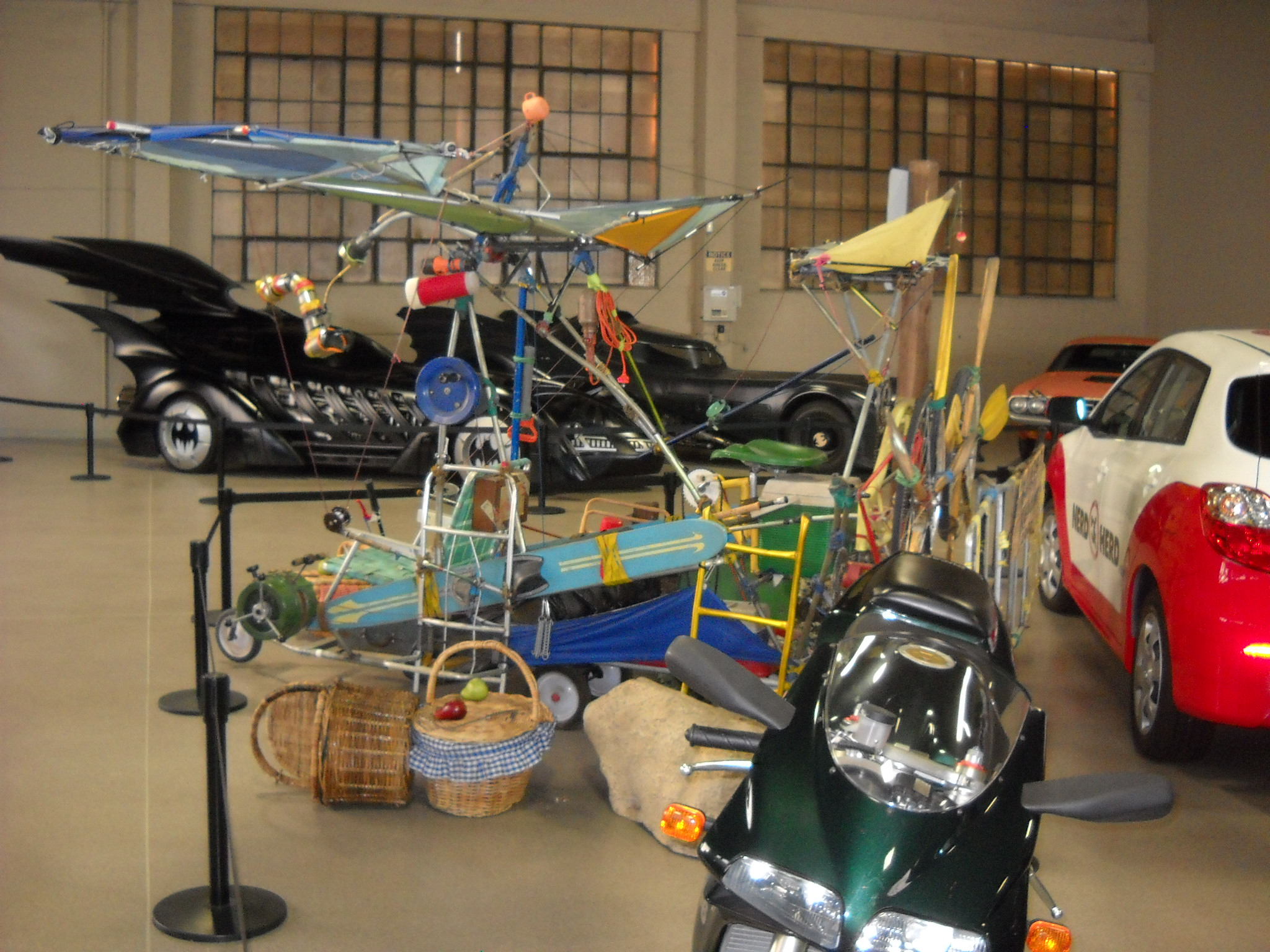
The Basket-Nabber 2000 from the film at Warner Bros. Studios Burbank.

=== Filming ===
In October 2008, it was announced that a live-action/animated Yogi Bear film was in the works. Ash Brannon was originally hired to direct the film, but was replaced by Eric Brevig (Journey to the Center of the Earth 3-D) when it was decided that the film would be produced in 3D. Principal photography took place on the Lake Whakamaru Reserve, Waikato, New Zealand as it was winter in the Northern Hemisphere, and to wait for summer of 2009 would put the production end time to be six months longer than if in Southern Hemisphere. Studio filming took place at Studio West in West Auckland.

Like many Hanna-Barbera characters, Yogi's personality and mannerisms were based on a popular celebrity of his original cartoon's time. Art Carney's Ed Norton character on The Honeymooners was said to be Yogi's inspiration; his voice mannerisms broadly mimic Carney as Norton, and Carney in turn received influence from Borscht Belt and comedians of vaudeville.

=== Casting ===
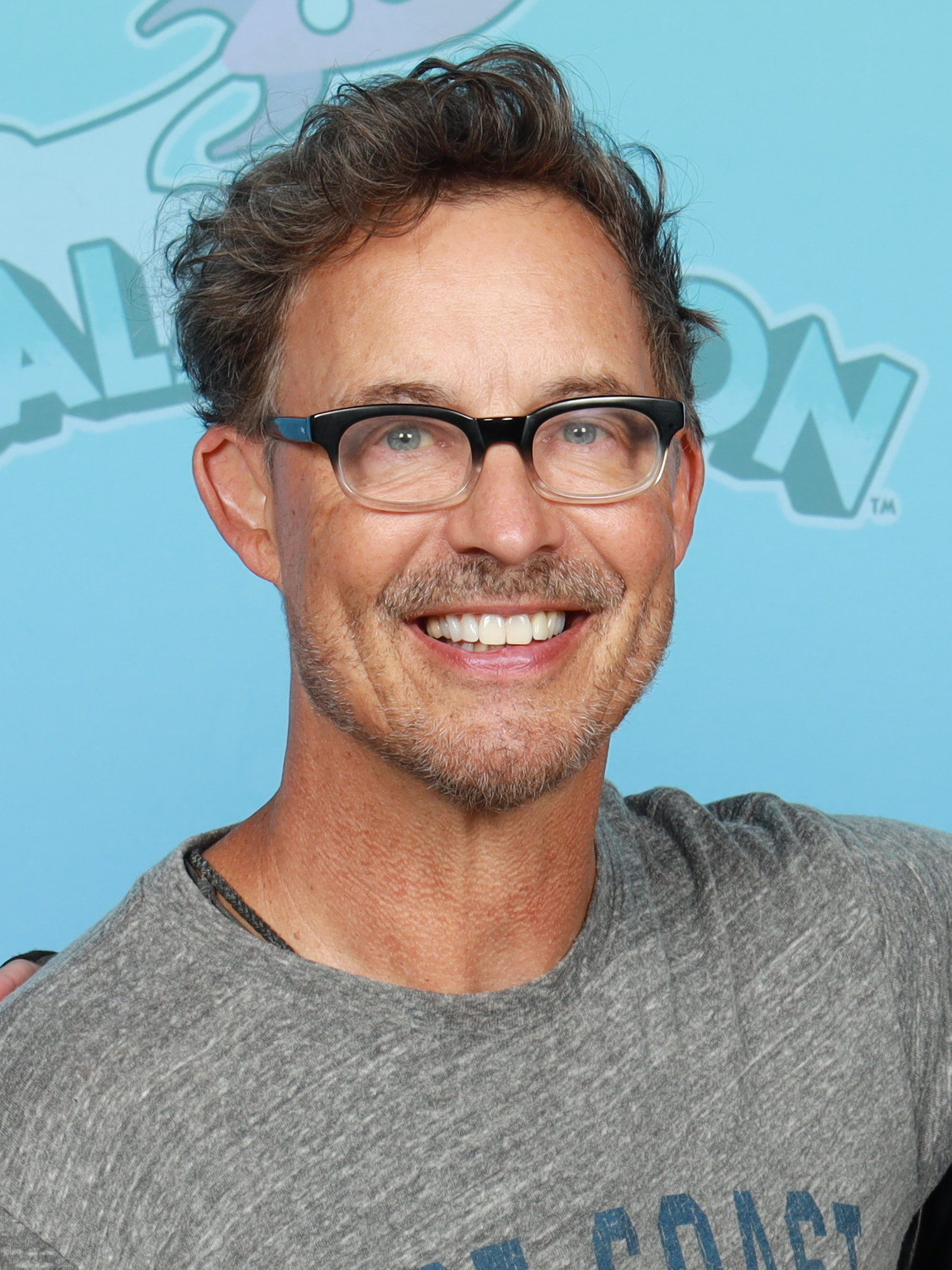
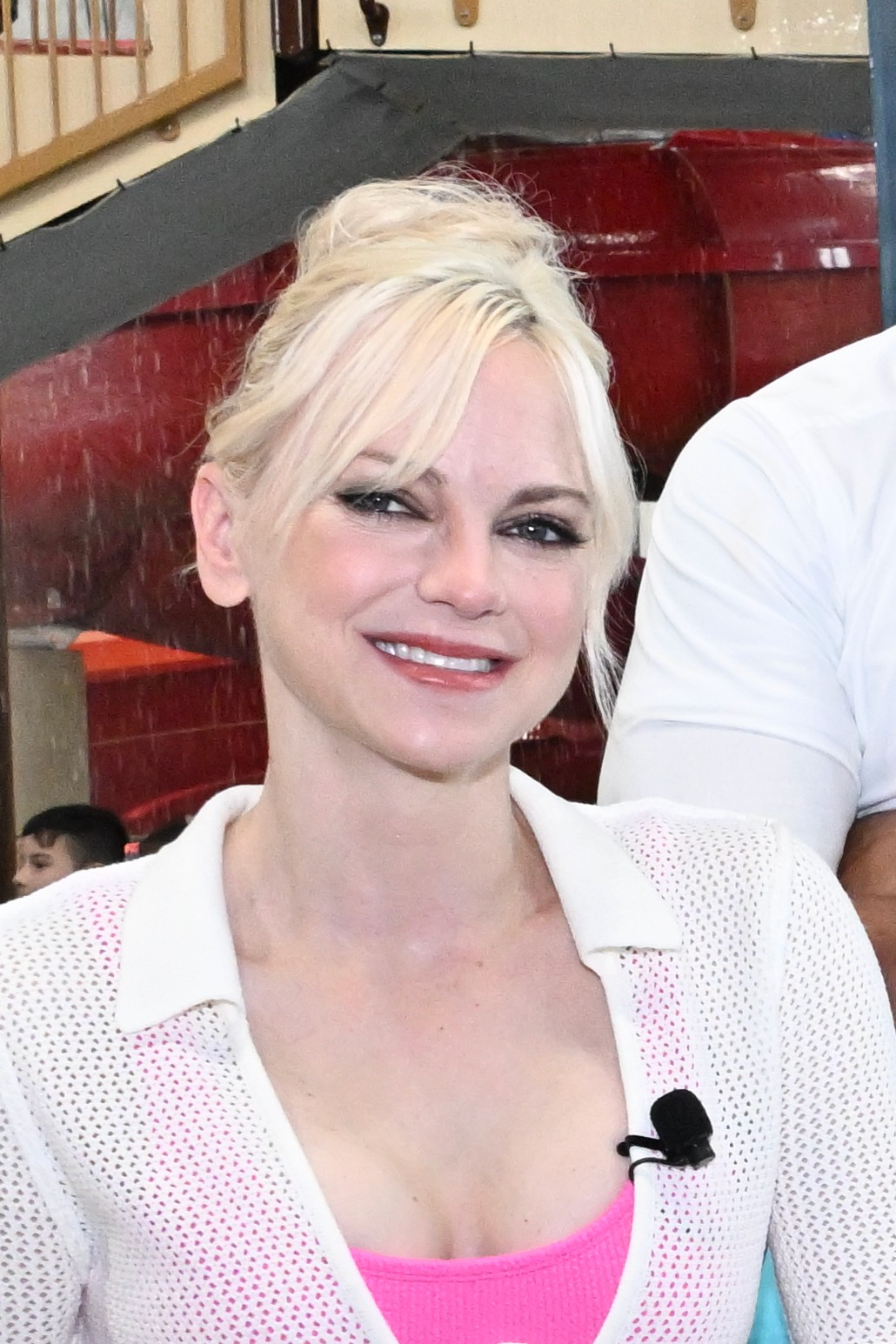
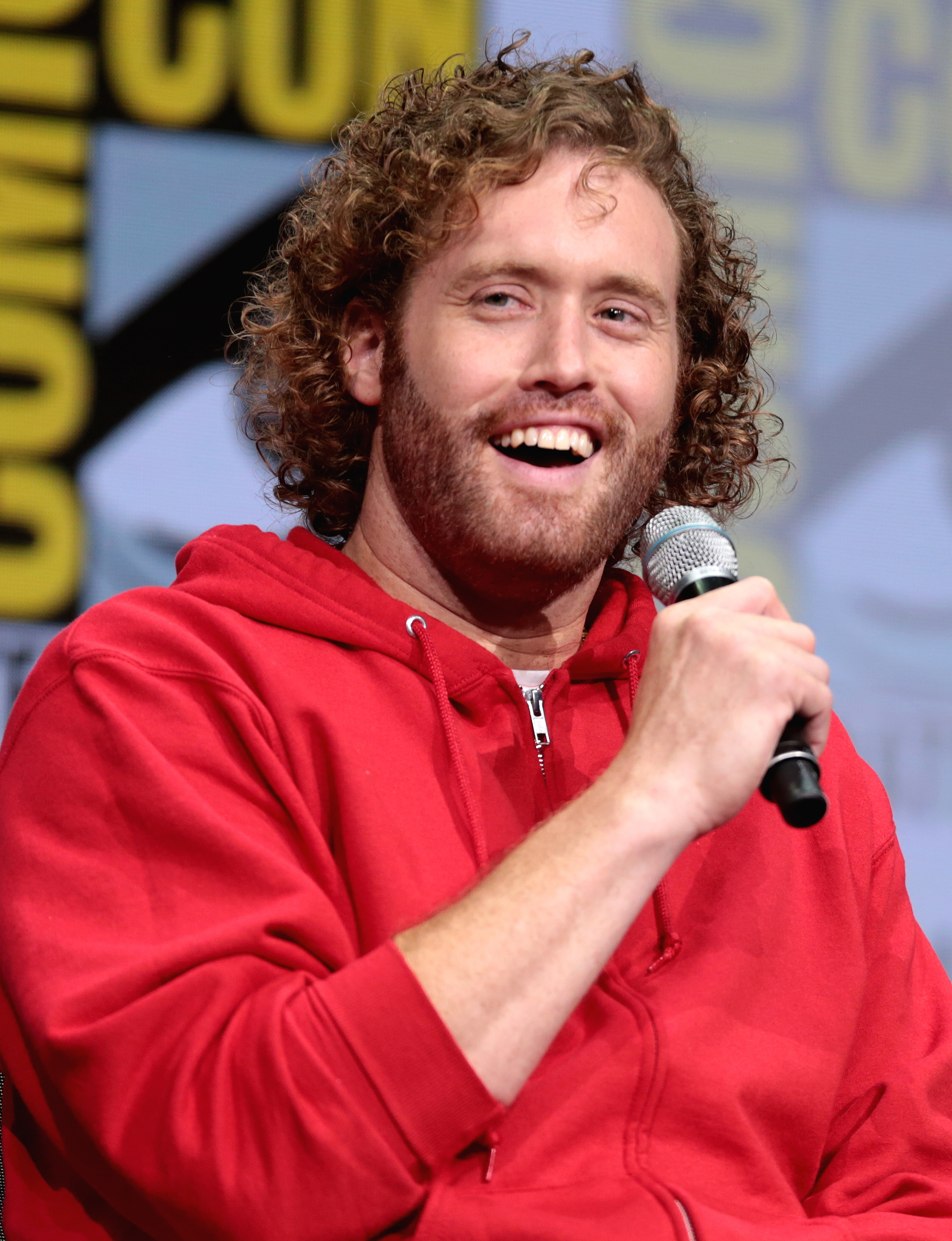
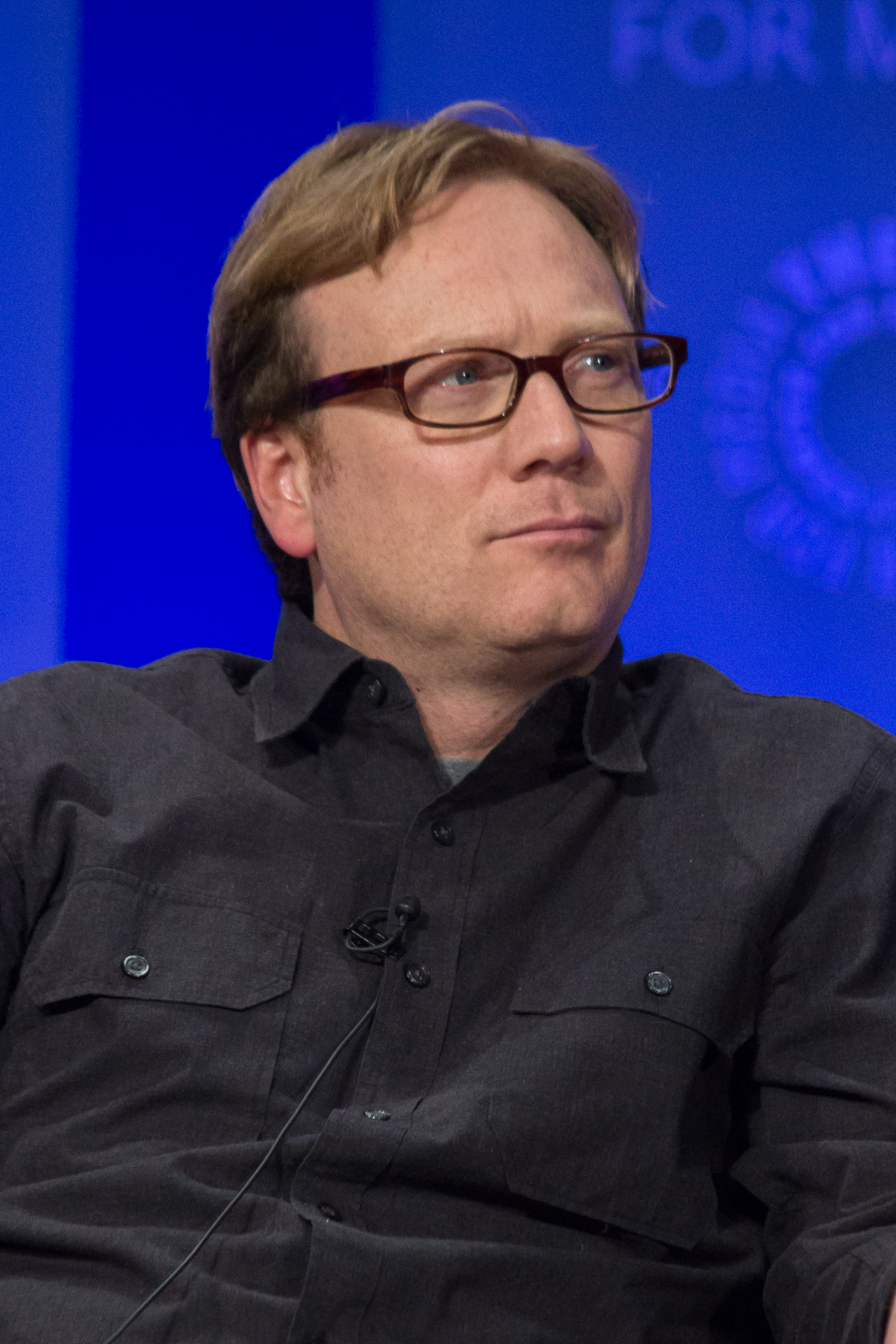
Tom Cavanagh (left), Anna Faris, T.J. Miller and Andy Daly play Ranger Smith, Rachel Johnson, Ranger Jones and Mayor Brown

Dan Aykroyd, the voice of Yogi Bear in the film, explained that he was trying to evoke the influences that shaped Daws Butler's original Yogi Bear voice: "It's about hitting certain notes, going back to those old Lower East Side rhythms, the Catskills, Jersey, Upstate New York. It's the Yiddish language, essentially, being spoken in English. It's the 'setup, delivery, punch' that sitcoms live on today. That's where the origin of American humor is." Aykroyd also stated that he grew up watching Yogi Bear on the long, cold and dark afternoons in his native Ottawa: "As a kid growing up in Ottawa, Ontario, Canada, where the sky turns dark in the winter at about 3:30, Yogi Bear was my fire, my hearth, when I would come home. I would immediately turn on the TV while I thawed out." Regarding the film, Brevig stated that he didn't want parents who remembered watching Yogi Bear cartoons in their youth to feel marginalized and displaced by the film's contemporary depiction of Yogi Bear.

Justin Timberlake came on to the film with a prepared Boo-Boo Bear voice; when he was learning to sing when he was younger, he imitated various cartoon characters.

=== Visual effects ===
Rhythm & Hues Studios (R&H) provided the character animation for Yogi and Boo-Boo Bear and the frog-mouthed turtle in the film; the company had also worked on previous films based on Hanna-Barbera productions, such as The Flintstones (1994) and its prequel Viva Rock Vegas (2000); Scooby-Doo (2002) and its sequel Monsters Unleashed (2004).

=== Music ===
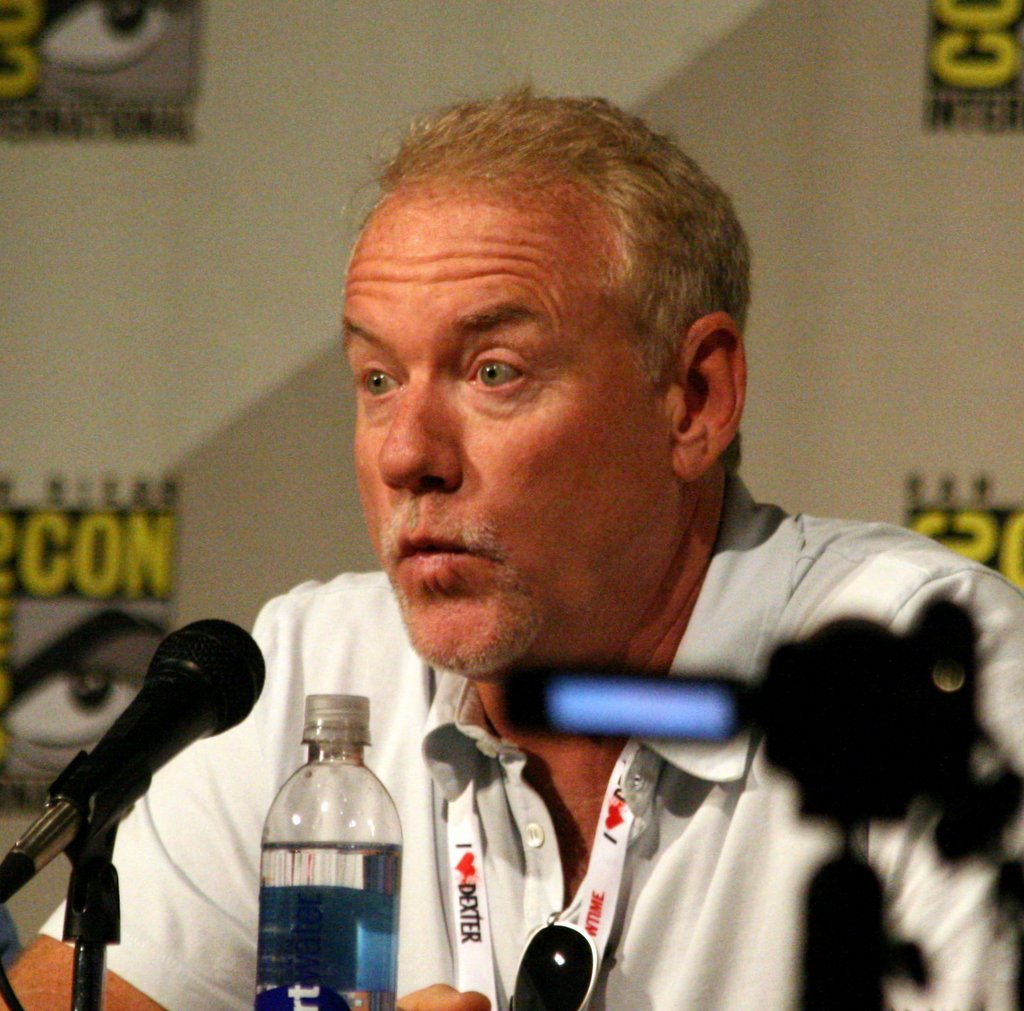
John Debney composed the film's score.

The music of the film and this album are both credited to be composed and conducted by American composer John Debney.

Soundtrack
Song title	Written by	Performed by
Lasagna	'Weird Al' Yankovic	'Weird Al' Yankovic
Rhythm Of Love	Tom Higgenson, Mike Retondo, Tim Lopez, De'Mar Hamilton and Dave Tirio	Plain White T's
Baby Got Back	Sir Mix A Lot	Sir Mix A Lot
The Sound of Sunshine	Jason Bowman, Michael Franti and Carl Young	Michael Franti & Spearhead
Also Sprach Zarathrustra	Richard Strauss	-
William Tell Overture	Gioachino Rossini	Orchestral Academy of Los Angeles
Rachel's Song	Brad Copeland and Tom Cavanagh	Tom Cavanagh
Nothin' But a Good Time	Bobby Dall, C.C DeVille, Bret Michaels and Rikki Rocket	Poison
Runnin' Wild	Joel O'Keeffe	Airbourne
Theme from Superman	John Willians	-
Don't Stop Believin'	Jonathan Cain, Neal Schon and Steve Perry	Journey
My Best Friend	Rivers Cuomo	Weezer

== Release ==
The film was originally scheduled for release on June 25, 2010, but was pushed back to December 17, 2010, in order to avoid competition with Grown Ups. In theaters, the film was accompanied by an animated Looney Tunes short titled Rabid Rider, starring Wile E. Coyote and the Road Runner.

On December 13, 2010, shortly before the film was released in the United States, a fanmade parody video titled "Yogi Bear Parody: "Booboo Kills Yogi" ending" was uploaded on YouTube, serving as an alternate and darker ending to the film (as well as a spoof of The Assassination of Jesse James by the Coward Robert Ford) in which Yogi finds Boo-Boo sitting on a chair carrying a double-barreled shotgun as he sees his own picture on a "Wanted" sign with a $5000 reward for whoever kills him. The video ends with fake end credits set to the song We'll Be Alright by Travie McCoy, showing Yogi turned into a rug. The parody was done by Edmund Earle, a 25-year-old Rhode Island School of Design graduate, who made the video in three months using only the trailers and promotional material as references. After the video went viral on Twitter, this led to many people being concerned about whether or not the younger viewers would click on the video in the belief that it is the film's actual ending. While Warner Bros. didn't demand Earle to take down the video, they added a disclaimer telling that the video was done with no one affiliated with the studio or the film's production.

=== Marketing ===
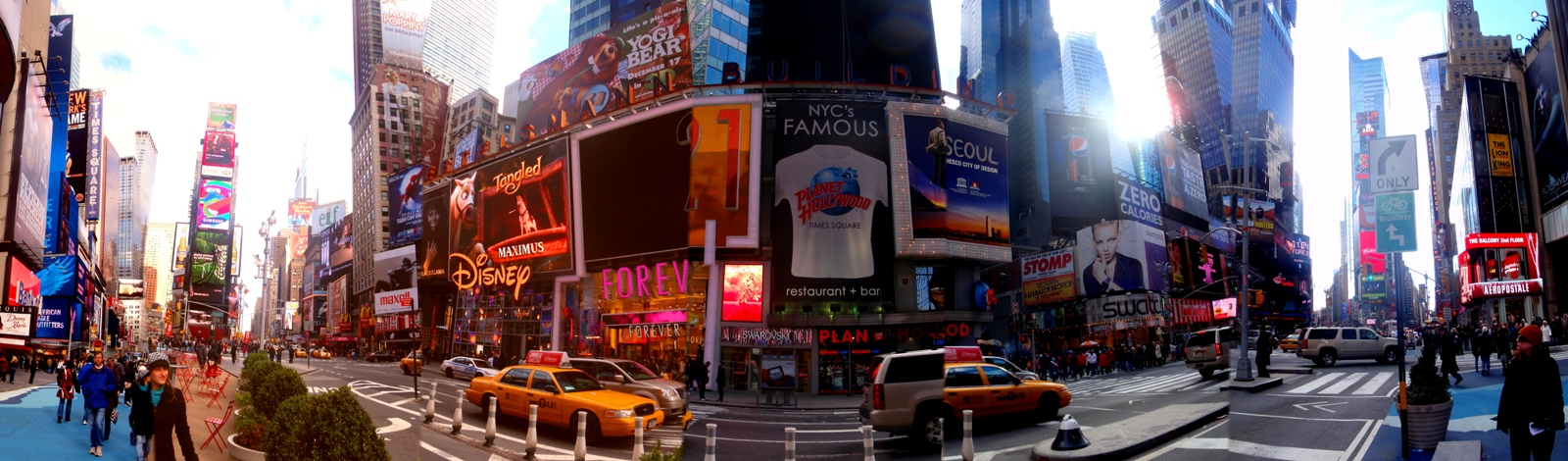
Promotional film advert in Times Square, New York City.

A teaser poster depicted Yogi standing behind BooBoo with the slogan, "Great things come in bears." The poster was much derided on the Internet because of Yogi's "wild-eyed gaze," teeth that looked like fangs, and the unfortunate combination of image and words. "Interesting choice, Warner Brothers," wrote Edith Zimmerman in Vulture. Agreed Amid Amidi in Cartoon Brew, "I'm not sure what's more disturbing in this Yogi Bear poster: the grotesquely incompetent artwork or the dirty double entendre tagline. Yogi's position behind BooBoo and the expressions on their faces don't help matters."

The film's first trailer was debuted online on July 28, 2010. It was also attached with Cats & Dogs: The Revenge of Kitty Galore and Alpha and Omega. A second trailer debuted with Legend of the Guardians: The Owls of Ga'Hoole, and a third and final trailer debuted with Megamind, Tangled and Harry Potter and the Deathly Hallows – Part 1. One of the trailers was also attached to showings of Tron: Legacy in the United Kingdom.

=== Home media ===
Warner Home Video released the film on Blu-ray and DVD on March 22, 2011, in four versions:

- DVD (single disc edition)
- Blu-ray (single disc edition)
- Blu-ray + DVD + Digital Copy combo pack
- Blu-ray 3D + Blu-ray + DVD + Digital Copy combo pack

== Reception ==
=== Box office ===
Yogi Bear debuted at the American box office at No. 2 behind Tron: Legacy, with an under-performing $16.4 million compared to Tron Legacy's $44 million. The opening weekend was lower than Warner Bros. expected, but executives believed that the film would hold well throughout the holiday season. The film grossed $100 million in the United States and $104 million internationally, for a worldwide total of $204 million against an $80 million budget.

=== Critical response ===
On Rotten Tomatoes, the film has an approval rating of 13% based on 105 reviews and an average rating of 3.7/10. The site's critical consensus reads, "Yogi Bear's 3D effects and all-star voice cast are cold comfort for its aggressively mediocre screenplay." On Metacritic the film has a score of 35 out of 100 based on 23 critics, indicating "generally unfavorable reviews". Audiences polled by CinemaScore gave the film an average grade of "B" on an A+ to F scale.

Common Sense Media gave the film one star, saying "Dumber-than-average family comedy won't even impress kids." IGN gave the film 4.0/10, and summed up their review by saying "Of course, Yogi Bear is meant as a kids movie. And one supposes that it works on that level (the little ones at the press screening I attended seemed mildly amused). But we learned long ago that kids movies can operate on more than one level, and that's not something that director Eric Brevig (Journey to the Center of the Earth 3-D) or his screenwriters are interested in. The result is a movie that's dumber than the average bear. Though at least it has a pee joke in it."

=== Awards ===
Award	Category	Nominee	Result
Teen Choice Award	Choice Movie: Voice	Justin Timberlake	Nominated
ASCAP Award	Top Box Office Films	John Debney	Won
EMA Award	Feature Film	Yogi Bear	Won

== Video game ==
A video game titled Yogi Bear: The Video Game was released for the Wii and Nintendo DS.
