= Robot and Monster =

American animated series

- Genre: Comedy; Adventure
- Created by: Dave Pressler; Joshua Sternin; Jennifer Ventimilia
- Voices of: Harland Williams; Curtis Armstrong; Jonathan Slavin; Maurice LaMarche; Jeff Bennett; Megan Hilty; Cree Summer; Nolan North
- Theme music composer: Brad Joseph Breeck
- Composer: Jeff Sudakin
- Country of origin: United States
- Original language: English
- No. of seasons: 1
- No. of episodes: 26 (50 segments)

Production
- Executive producers: Dave Pressler; Joshua Sternin; Jennifer Ventimilia
- Producer: Monique Beatty
- Running time: 22 minutes (11 minutes per segment)
- Production companies: Smasho! Productions; LowBar Productions; Nickelodeon Animation Studio

Original release
- Network: Nickelodeon
- Release: August 4 – December 8, 2012
- Network: Nicktoons
- Release: December 26, 2013 – February 14, 2015
- Network: Noggin (app)
- Release: March 5, 2015

Robot and Monster is an American animated television series created by Dave Pressler, Joshua Sternin and Jennifer Ventimilia. Main characters Robot and Monster are voiced by Curtis Armstrong and comedian Harland Williams, respectively. It began production in 2009 and was ordered for a full 26-episode season in 2010, before finally premiering on Nickelodeon on August 4, 2012. Most episodes aired on Nickelodeon, but several episodes were left unaired on the channel. Some of these episodes later premiered on Nicktoons, and the remaining unaired segments were released on the Noggin streaming app on March 5, 2015.

== Premise ==
The series follows the day-to-day adventures of Robot Default, a genius inventor, living with his roommate Monster Krumholtz, a cheerful and enthusiastic purple monster, and their grey pest-turned-pet Marf who live in a retro-futuristic world where colorful sapient robots (Mechanicals) and monstrous beings (Organics) coexist with each other.

The duo work at the Blinking Light Factory, owned by Robot's snobby older brother, Gart, who loves to make his little brother as miserable as possible; as well as run-ins with their obsessive friend Ogo, their neighbor and co-worker Perry, whose face gears are stuck in a smiling position, and their love-interests, J.D. and Spitfire.

== Characters ==
=== Main ===
- Robot Default (voiced by Curtis Armstrong) is an orange robot who works as a quality control at the Blinking Light Factory. Robot is an eternal pessimist always feeling like the world is trying to keep him down; his know-it-all brother Gart does not help at all. Luckily, after meeting Monster, who believes in him all the way, Robot now has a best friend. He is the smarter, more cunning of the duo. He frequently tries to invent new devices, usually without success. He and Monster had been friends since they were kids, despite Monster being warned to stay away from him and his dangerous inventions.
- Monster Krumholtz (voiced by Harland Williams) is a purple monster. Monster is an eternal optimist living by the motto that "Good things happen to good people", and that all people are good. Monster is an extremely outgoing Organic that is endlessly fascinated by the little things in life. Monster is driven to make everyone happy, and the need to explore the "shiny thing". But because of Monster's fascination with the world, he is very gullible. Unlike Robot, Monster feels like everything goes his way, although it does not, making him a very good friend to have around.
- Marf (voiced by Curtis Armstrong and Jeff Bennett in "Speak, Marf, Speak") is Robot and Monster's pet. He is a block of metal who acts like a dog, and only says "marf".
- Ogo (voiced by Jonathan Slavin) is the third wheel of Robot and Monster's friendship. He has an obsession with Robot and Monster, which tends to annoy Robot. He constantly tries to involve himself in the duo's doings, and just cannot seem to grasp that he is not part of the team. As shown in "Ogo's Birthday", Monster still cherishes Ogo as one of his friends, though Robot does not. Ogo has been known to survive near-death experiences. In "Ogo's Cool", Ogo zaps himself with Robot's cool ray to become popular, thus causing Robot and Monster to become obsessed with Ogo and he is creeped out. He is allergic to bacon, which makes him drowsy/nauseous.
- Perry (voiced by Maurice LaMarche) is a robot co-worker of Robot and Monster's. He always has a smile on his face, but it's due to a function problem, as revealed in "Come On, Get Happy". He is very unlucky, and when something is thrown, it almost always hits him. He usually feels miserable and the only thing that makes him genuinely happy is Robot's misfortunes. He is shaped like a sewage pipe, colored in orange with a yellow "2".
- J.D. (voiced by Megan Hilty) is a cool, rebellious biker chick whose best friend is her equally hip robotic bike Spitfire. She is also good friends with Robot and Monster. Robot, Monster and nearly every guy at the Makin' Bacon have a huge crush on her. Robot and Monster at times try to impress J.D. but end up failing.
- Spitfire (voiced by Cree Summer) is JD's equally hip robotic bike. They are inseparable best friends and regulars at the local bacon joint, Makin' Bacon. They are like the cooler, female versions of Robot and Monster. JD can be hot-headed at times while Spitfire is more rational and willing to avoid fights, but will fight for her friend. Spitfire can be bossy, as stated in "Biker Girls". Robot has shown slight interest in Spitfire before.
- Gart Default (voiced by Maurice LaMarche) is Robot's arrogant, overbearing older brother. He is selfish and always teasing Robot. He runs their family's Blinking Light factory. He is gold-tinted, is shinier than Robot, has six wheels for feet, while Robot has four, and has actual hands as opposed to Robot's claws.

=== Recurring ===
- Nessie (voiced by Rhea Perlman) is the six-tentacled owner and manager of the Makin' Bacon.
- Punch Morley (voiced by Fred Tatasciore) was once a Pole-O player and then he retired. He is now the handyman at the Blinking light factory. He has had short-term memory loss ever since he hit his head with a pole from a Pole-O game.
- Crikey (voiced by Nolan North) is a sadistic Cockney-accented robot. He also has an identical cousin named Blimey and usually torments Robot & Monster and gets beaten up by J.D. and Spitfire in a few episodes.
- Mr. Wheelie (voiced by Kurtwood Smith) is Robot and Monster's irate and sarcastic landlord with a big blue spiky head and bicycle wheels for feet. He threatens to kick Robot and Monster out of their apartment if he finds their pet Marf, since pets are not allowed.
- Master Grabmirist (voiced by Ping Wu) is a sensei who meets up with Robot & Monster whenever they need help, however his methods tend to fail quickly.
- Hal Worth-a-ton (voiced by Nolan North) is a Texan-accented salesman who lies about his products on the tube.
- Pendulum Depot (voiced by Nolan North) is a Mechanical who owns the Solid Light Factory and is the main rival to the Defaults and their Blinking Light Factory. He plans on stealing the Default's Blinking Light Formula, and make them out of business. He usually carries around a rocket umbrella for show.
- Arpa Default (voiced by April Winchell) is Gart and Robot's mother whose arrogance Gart takes after. Despite her preference in Gart, it has been shown on few occasions that Arpa still loves her other son, Robot, by keeping a picture of him in her chest compartment.
- Grandma Default (voiced by April Winchell) is Gart and Robot's grandmother and Arpa's mother, a cranky family member who speaks computer binary (says only "one" and "zero") and hates Organics.
- Gizmo Default (voiced by Alan Tudyk) is Robot's crazy cousin who talks to imaginary people and is considered an embarrassment to the Default family.
- Uncle Kuffley Krumholtz (voiced by Nolan North) is Monster's loud-mouth uncle who is a police officer and a teacher of the Traffic Walking School.
- Globitha Krumholtz (voiced by Cree Summer) is Monster's hyperactive little sister who has a large (and annoying) affection towards Robot (Much to Monster's jealousy). Still, Monster shows her his affection/empathy. Robot does not want her to help him with inventions because she ruins everything she touches.
- Lev Krumholtz (voiced by Bill Fagerbakke) is Monster's dad whose horns are bigger than him. His horns make him talented but are revealed to be false in "Hornica".
- Lucy (voiced by Jennifer Cody) is a Mechanical who is Robot's long-time rival. To outsmart Robot in a contest to make a two-color blinking light, she befriended Ogo so she can use his brain as a processor chip to power the blinking light in "Ogo's Friend". She always denies Robot's existence, saying that she has no idea who he is.
- The Prince of Scamtown (voiced by Fred Tatasciore) is a Mechanical who is of royal descent. He is generous despite his name. In "The Prince of Scamtown", Robot does not believe he is an actual prince although Monster does.
- Loudmouth (voiced by Maurice LaMarche) is a tiny but very angry Mechanical who is one of Robot and Monster's co-workers at the Blinking Lights Factory.
- Snap Winsome (voiced by Jeff Bennett) is an Organic and the host of various shows such as That's Amazing! and Ow! That Hurts!.
- Dame Lady Madame (voiced by Ruth Williamson) is a prestigious female Mechanical of high-society.
- Bea Holder (voiced by Harriet Sansom Harris) is a cycloptic Organic who is a trendsetter.
- Howly (voiced by Maurice LaMarche) is a cyber monkey that flies into rage when having photos taken. Monster befriended it in "The Dark Night".
- Lil' Lugnuts (voiced by Nolan North) is an Organic and was Monster's idol until Robot found that Lil' Lugnuts was actually a criminal.
- Katie (voiced by Carol Ann Susi) is a mechanical lady, and the owner of Narf. She finds Robot and Monster to be annoying, and thinks Marf is a stupid name.
- The Organic Pole-O Players are a series of players often seen at times.

== Episodes ==
- The chronological order of the series is by production code, rather than by how the episodes are aired or how they are listed on the DVD.

No.	Title	Directed by	Written by	Original release date	Prod. code	US viewers (millions)
1a	"Monster's Great Escape"	Sam Levine	Julia Miranda	August 4, 2012	113	2.9
Monster is shocked to discover that Robot had played a practical joke on him during their childhood. Monster decides to get even by pulling an elaborate prank on Robot. However, practical jokes do not come naturally to Monster and the joke he pulls ends up being on himself.
1b	"Game Boys"	Gary Conrad	Julia Miranda	August 4, 2012	106	2.9
Monster helps Robot achieve his life-long dream of playing in a Pole-O game (this world's most popular sport, a cross between football and caber tossing). This could very well be the highlight of Robot's life, assuming he survives despite his failure.
2a	"Between Brothers"	Sam Levine	Joshua Sternin and Jennifer Ventimilia	August 10, 2012	116	N/A
When Robot's mean-spirited older brother Gart becomes the landlord of Robot & Monster's building, the boys must put their heads together to get their apartment back.
2b	"Safety First"	Sam Levine	Gary Conrad	August 10, 2012	115	N/A
After another injury at the Blinking Light Factory, Gart commissions Robot and Monster to make a safety film. Robot is the director, a position he relishes, until he has to replace Monster, the film's star, with Ogo.
3a	"How to Train Your Marf"	Adam Henry	Julia Miranda	August 10, 2012	109	N/A
Marf's behavior takes a destructive turn for the worse, forcing Robot & Monster to institute emergency pet training. They each draw on their personal strengths to devise training methods for their beloved pet, only to discover he may not be all that he appears.
3b	"Blinking Light"	Sam Levine	Dave Schiff	August 10, 2012	110	N/A
Gart leaves the factory to receive an award. Due to this, he leaves Robot in charge of the Blinking Light Factory, but things don't go as planned.
4a	"The Blimp"	Adam Henry	Kacey Arnold	August 11, 2012	103	2.5
Robot and Monster want to buy a blimp, but their obsession with bacon gets in the way. What will they do when they have so much bacon grease in their bodies that the blimp is unable to fly with them in it?
4b	"Come On, Get Happy"	Gary Conrad	Joshua Sternin and Jennifer Ventimilia	August 11, 2012	102	2.5
When Robot and Monster discover Perry, a mechanical co-worker of theirs who always seems to be smiling, Monster is distressed that he may no longer be The Happiest Guy in the World. Robot takes it upon himself to help his friend regain his smile, but then Perry's smile turns out to be just the way his face is stuck.
5a	"Nobody Panic"	Adam Henry	Laurie Israel and Rachel Ruderman	August 11, 2012	111	2.5
When Nessie takes her first vacation, Robot and Monster agree to fill in for her - cooking and serving bacon at The Makin' Bacon. The arrangement, however, soon sends the eatery out of control.
5b	"Adventures in Babysitting"	Adam Henry	Julia Miranda	August 11, 2012	117	2.5
When Globitha (Monster's younger sister who has a fanatical crush on Robot) comes to stay with the boys, she inadvertently wreaks havoc on Robot's preparations for the city's Big Blimp Race.
6a	"Speeding Ticket"	Gary Conrad	Kenny Byerly	August 17, 2012	119	2.6
When Monster's Uncle Cuffley loses his confidence, Robot and Monster set out to ignite his passion for the law.
6b	"Hornica"	Sam Levine	Joshua Sternin and Jennifer Ventimilia	August 17, 2012	120	2.6
Monster's father comes to visit, and Monster loses his horns just before Hornica.
7a	"Cheer Up Wheelie"	Sam Levine	Jeremy Shipp	August 17, 2012	148	2.2
After Mr. Wheelie raises their rent, Robot and Monster set out to discover what makes him so angry in the hopes that, once they cheer him up, he'll stop being cruel to everybody.
7b	"Ogo's Friend"	Sam Levine	Kenny Byerly	August 17, 2012	122	2.2
Ogo befriends Robot's nemesis, Lucy. Together, they create a two-color blinking light before Robot can create even one, to Robot's surprise and jealousy.
8a	"Biker Girls"	Adam Henry	Kenny Byerly	August 18, 2012	114	2.4
J.D. comes to stay with Robot and Monster after she and Spitfire have a big fight. However, Robot and Monster feel she might not be the best roommate.
8b	"The Prince of Scamtown"	Adam Henry	Kenny Byerly	August 18, 2012	104	2.4
Monster starts giving all of the money Robot gives him to pay the house bills to a strange figure called The Prince of Scamtown who promises to pay Monster back.
9a	"Pinball Wizard"	Gary Conrad	Jeremy Shipp	August 18, 2012	112	1.7
Robot becomes Monster's guinea pig when Monster starts playing "pinball", a game where you have to throw spiky balls at a target.
9b	"Speak Marf Speak"	Adam Henry	Peter Tibbals and Eric Goldberg	August 18, 2012	121	1.7
Robot invents a device to translate Marf's speech into English, but when the pet tires of being treated as such, he enslaves Robot and Monster through blackmail.
10a	"Security Risk"	Gary Conrad	Kenny Byerly	August 24, 2012	107	2.4
Robot decides to create a dangerous security system after having his apartment burglarized.
10b	"Ogo's Birthday"	Gary Conrad	Peter Goldfinger	August 24, 2012	105	2.4
While attempting to avoid attending Ogo's birthday party, Robot and Monster visit the city's Sewage Treatment Plant and discover it is a wondrous theme park. Soon, they discover they were the only ones invited to Ogo's party and they end up going anyway.
11a	"Doctor? No!"	Gary Conrad	Dave Schiff	August 24, 2012	126	2.0
After contracting a disease called "robies" from being bitten by Marf, Robot decides to endure the ever-worsening symptoms in order to avoid seeing a doctor. Unfortunately, he soon turns into a mime as a side-effect of the robies, so Monster has to find a way to help him.
11b	"Monster Invention"	Sam Levine	Kenny Byerly	August 24, 2012	145	2.0
Robot creates laser-pointed pop-bacon and hopes for it to become a great invention. However, he becomes jealous when Monster creates a head-scratching invention made of found objects that becomes an overnight success.
12a	"Litterbug"	Sam Levine	Dave Schiff	August 31, 2012	123	2.8
Monster believes that Robot has been unfairly accused of littering and takes his case to court.
12b	"Model Citizen"	Gary Conrad	Laurie Israel and Rachel Ruderman	August 31, 2012	124	2.8
Robot is declared the new standard of beauty by a famous fashionista.
13a	"Grandma's Day Out"	Adam Henry	Julia Miranda	August 31, 2012	118	2.5
Robot must find his Grandma when she goes missing.
13b	"Spare Robot"	Gary Conrad	Gabriel Garza	August 31, 2012	146	2.5
Robot creates a replica of himself to do tedious tasks.
14a	"Apartment 3 1/2"	Adam Henry	Kenny Byerly	September 7, 2012	141	2.6
Robot teaches Monster how to be an adult, but soon Robot starts to see Monster's imaginary friend, Fuzzy Slippers. Special guest star: Adam Wylie as Fuzzy Slippers.
14b	"Don't! Walk!"	Gary Conrad	Jase Ricci	September 7, 2012	142	2.6
After a tragic fair accident, Monster loses his walking license.
15a	"Lil' Lugnuts"	Sam Levine	Sindy Boveda-Spackman	September 14, 2012	131	2.7
Robot discovers that Monster's childhood idol is a thief.
15b	"Letterology"	Adam Henry	Julia Miranda	September 14, 2012	132	2.7
Monster and Robot find out about "letterology", a new form of horoscopes that has to do with what "letter" you are. When Monster finds out Robot's "letter", he tries to keep Robot awake because he thinks Robot will wake up to disaster.
16a	"The Party"	Gary Conrad	Julia Miranda	September 21, 2012	135	2.7
Robot must keep his crazy cousin Gizmo from learning about a family party, because he's afraid Gizmo will ruin the party.
16b	"First Impressions"	Sam Levine	Jim Mortensen	September 21, 2012	136	2.7
Robot's hero is in town and looking for an apprentice. Special guest star: Jon Polito as Sir Cranklin.
17a	"Dirty Money"	Gary Conrad	Dave Schiff	December 26, 2013 (Nicktoons)	127	N/A
Robot and Monster want to be caught up on the newest trend, "Giggle Sticks." They think it's their lucky day when they find money on the ground, but problems arise when they argue about what to do with the money.
17b	"What J.D. Wants"	Sam Levine	Julia Miranda	December 26, 2013 (Nicktoons)	108	N/A
Robot and Monster compete and try to impress J.D. to see who can win her over.
18a	"Game On"	Adam Henry	Dave Schiff	September 25, 2012	137	1.7
Robot and Monster compete with J.D. and Spitfire on a game show, threatening their friendship.
18b	"Bad News Baconeers"	Gary Conrad	Kenny Byerly	December 25, 2013	138	1.7
Robot coaches a team of young Pole-O players.
19a	"The Package"	Chuck Austen	Kacey Arnold	November 2, 2012	140	2.1
Robot and Monster decide to make a little extra money for a color Tube by delivering a secret package to a series of suspicious characters, but they realize too late that they've entangled themselves into something much bigger.
19b	"Ogo's Cool"	Adam Henry	Gary Rolin	November 2, 2012	139	2.1
After testing Robot's latest invention, the Cool Ray, Robot and Monster find themselves desperate for the cool Ogo's attention.
20a	"Super Pole"	Gary Conrad	Julia Miranda	November 9, 2012	133	1.6
Monster becomes overly aggressive while rooting for a rival sports team, resulting in tension between him and Robot.
20b	"Boomerang"	Chuck Austen	Dave Schiff	November 9, 2012	149	1.6
Monster sets out to prove the existence of karma. In a subplot, Robot tries to find a way to get revenge on Gart.
21a	"J.D. Loves Gart"	Adam Henry	Kenny Byerly and Jase Ricci	February 13, 2015 (Nicktoons) (Note: This episode was first released in Robot and Monster: Season 1 DVD on November 11, 2014.)	143	0.13
When it appears that J.D. has fallen for Gart, Robot sets out to reveal Gart's true character to J.D., while Monster desperately clings to his ideals of true love. Note: This episode was first released November 17, 2012 on Amazon Video, and later on November 11, 2014 on DVD.
21b	"Misery Date"	Gary Conrad	Julia Miranda	February 13, 2015 (Nicktoons)	144	0.13
Robot is forced to be Globitha's date to the school dance. Note: This episode was first released on November 17, 2012 on Amazon Video, and later on November 11, 2014 on DVD.
22a	"Anger Management"	Adam Henry	Dave Schiff	October 12, 2012	147	1.5
Monster takes classes to learn how to be angry.
22b	"Family Business"	Chuck Austen	Jase Ricci	September 12, 2012	150	1.5
Finally having enough of being disrespected by his family, Robot quits their business to go work for a competitor.
23a	"The Bacon Tree"	Sam Levine	Peter Goldfinger	October 26, 2012	125	1.6
Robot and Monster are growing bacon trees. Robot tries to engineer one with an invention, but fails. Monster successfully grows a bacon tree exclusively with love, so when the bacon tree becomes jealous, it turns evil and attacks all of his friends.
23b	"The Dark Night"	Chuck Austen	Joshua Sternin and Jennifer Ventimilia	October 26, 2012	134	1.6
Monster befriends Howly, the rampaging cyber-monkey, so Robot decides to learn self-defense.
24a	"A Better Marf Trap"	Sam Levine	Joshua Sternin and Jennifer Ventimilia	March 5, 2015 (Noggin)	101	N/A
Robot and Monster recount on how they got their pet Marf. They found a mysterious mechanical creature living in the wall of their apartment, which they named Marf and made their pet.
24b	"Monster Lie"	Adam Henry	Kenny Byerly	March 5, 2015 (Noggin)	128	N/A
Robot and Monster lie to Perry that his homemade, terrible-smelling cologne smells good. To keep up the lie, they must continue to buy and wear the cologne, no matter how much it makes them stink.
25	"Baconmas"	Gary Conrad; Adam Henry	Joshua Sternin and Jennifer Ventimilia	December 7, 2012	129/130	2.1
Tensions run high when both Robot and Monster's families are invited to celebrate Baconmas at their apartment. Special guest star: Jeffrey Tambor as Saint Crispy.
26	"Monster Hit"	Chuckles Austin; Gary Conrad	Joshua Sternin and Jennifer Ventimilia	July 18, 2014	151/152	N/A
Robot and Monster become a musical sensation when Robot's invention creates a catchy song for Monster to perform. In a not-so-subtle parallel to the break-up of The Beatles, Monster then falls for a rival performer, the screeching "Robo Ono", whom everyone else considers terrible; Ono proceeds to drive a wedge between Robot and Monster, jeopardizing the latter's chance at stardom. Special guest stars: Kari Wahlgren as Robo Ono, Leon Thomas III as Monster's Singing Voice in the song "I Love Love", Greg Cipes as Vapid Milquetoast and Maurice LaMarche as Jerry.

== Reception ==
Emily Ashby of Common Sense Media gave the series 4 out of 5 stars; saying that, “Robot and Monster is a hilarious animated series that celebrates friendship and explores kid-related issues with comedy and quirkiness. [...] Each story includes a lesson about being a good friend, overcoming fear, or some other issue that kids will relate to.”

== Home media ==
On November 11, 2014, the series was released on DVD as a manufacture on demand Amazon exclusive in region 1 (though two episodes remained unaired at the time it was released until the first episode aired on Nicktoons and the second episode was released through the Noggin app).

The complete series was made available for streaming as part of Nickelodeon's Noggin app on March 5, 2015.

The show was also available on Paramount+ from November 10, 2020, until January 1, 2024.
