= Surviving Christmas =

2004 film by Mike Mitchell

- Theatrical release poster
- Directed by: Mike Mitchell
- Screenplay by: Deborah Kaplan; Harry Elfont; Jennifer Ventimilia; Joshua Sternin
- Story by: Deborah Kaplan; Harry Elfont
- Produced by: Jenno Topping; Betty Thomas
- Starring: Ben Affleck; James Gandolfini; Christina Applegate; Catherine O'Hara
- Cinematography: Peter Lyons Collister; Tom Priestley Jr.
- Edited by: Craig McKay
- Music by: Randy Edelman
- Production companies: Tall Trees; LivePlanet
- Distributed by: DreamWorks Pictures
- Release date: October 22, 2004
- Running time: 91 minutes
- Country: United States
- Language: English
- Budget: $45 million
- Box office: $15.1 million

Surviving Christmas is a 2004 American romantic comedy film directed by Mike Mitchell, written by Harry Elfont, Deborah Kaplan, Jennifer Ventimilia, and Joshua Sternin, based on a story by Elfont and Kaplan. It stars Ben Affleck, James Gandolfini, Christina Applegate, and Catherine O'Hara.

Surviving Christmas was released by DreamWorks Pictures on October 22, 2004. The film received negative reviews by critics and earned $15.1 million worldwide against a budget of $45 million. At the Golden Raspberry Awards, the film received nominations for Worst Picture, Worst Actor, and Worst Screenplay, but won none.

== Plot ==
Just before Christmas, wealthy advertising executive Drew Latham surprises his girlfriend, Missy Vangilder with first-class tickets to Fiji, but she is horrified that he would want to spend Christmas away from his family. Citing the fact that Drew has never even introduced her to his family, she concludes that he will never get serious about their relationship and dumps him. Drew has his assistant send her a Cartier bracelet to apologize. Desperate not to spend Christmas alone, Drew calls all his contacts to find a place to stay on Christmas, but he is not close enough to anyone to be invited.

Drew tracks down Missy's therapist Dr. Freeman at the airport, hoping for a therapy session. The hurried doctor tells him to list all of his grievances and burn them at his childhood home, which is now occupied by Tom and Christine Valco, and their son Brian.

As Drew is acting suspiciously when he sets his grievances on fire, Tom sneaks up behind him and knocks him out with a shovel. When he comes to, they let him come in to look around. He is thrilled to see his old room, so he impetuously offers Tom $250,000 to let him spend Christmas with them. He accepts, and Drew's lawyer draws up a contract that requires the Valcos to pose as his family.

Drew wears out his welcome with the Valcos quickly as a result of his childish behavior and demands. He breaks the banister on the stairs by attempting to slide down them, eats the last of Tom’s salami for breakfast, has a snowball fight with an unwilling Brian, which prompts Tom to intervene and tops it off by forcing the family to go out and buy a tree together, requiring Tom to wear a Santa hat in public.

While they are trimming the tree, their daughter Alicia arrives for the holidays. She is stunned by Drew's presence and is disgusted to hear that Tom rented the family out to Drew for the holidays.

Drew writes a script for the family to read at the table at dinner. He hires Saul, a local actor to play the part of his grandfather, whom he calls Doo-Dah, and Tom agrees to let Saul stay with them for the holidays for an extra $25,000. In an attempt to get Alicia to warm up to him, Drew takes her and Brian sledding the next day. After crashing at the bottom of a hill, he moves in to kiss Alicia, who sneezes instead.

As they recover at home from their colds, Alicia shares a childhood memory with Drew about an old tree that was coated in ice during a storm. Tom asks Drew to leave because he plans to divorce his wife Christine, but Drew encourages the couple to indulge themselves. Tom buys a Chevelle SS, which he had in high school, and Christine goes to a photographer for some glamour shots.

Drew takes Alicia to the old tree of her childhood, which he has covered in ice again. The gesture touches her, but he overdoes it, bringing in a full pageant production to surround the tree. Disgusted by his lack of restraint, Alicia demands that he leave, which he decides to do, and he ends their agreement and is set to write them a check.

Meanwhile, Missy is won over by the bracelet, and when Drew's assistant informs her that he is spending Christmas with his family, she phones Drew to tell him that she's outside the house with her parents. Drew quickly promises the Valcos an extra $75,000 if they keep playing along for the evening, and they agree.

The visit between the two families steadily descends into chaos, culminating with everyone seeing Christine's glamour shots manipulated into pornography on Brian's computer. Missy and her family storm out and Drew informs her that their relationship is officially over, as he realizes that his true feelings are for Alicia.

Drew tells Alicia the truth about his family: his father left them when he was just four, and his mother, a waitress, who would give him an adult stack of pancakes on Christmas until he was 18, died when he was in college.

Drew returns to his apartment to spend Christmas alone. Tom visits him to collect his money, and the two decide to go watch Saul perform in the local production of A Christmas Carol as he'd given the whole family tickets. At the play, Tom and Christine decide not to divorce and Drew encourages Brian to break the ice with a girl sitting next to him. Drew and Alicia make up outside the theater, and everyone then eats in the diner where Drew's mother worked double shifts to make extra money at Christmastime.

== Cast ==
- Ben Affleck as Drew Latham
- James Gandolfini as Tom Valco
- Christina Applegate as Alicia Valco
- Catherine O'Hara as Christine Valco
- Josh Zuckerman as Brian Valco
- Bill Macy as Saul (Doo-Dah)
- Jennifer Morrison as Missy Vangilder
- Udo Kier as Heinrich
- David Selby as Horace Vangilder
- Stephanie Faracy as Letitia Vangilder
- Stephen Root as Dr. Freeman
- Sy Richardson as Doo-Dah Understudy
- Tangie Ambrose as Kathryn
- Peter Jason as Suit
- Ray Buffer as Arnie
- Phill Lewis as Levine the lawyer
- Hailey Noelle Johnson as Little girl
- Sean Marquette as Older brother
- Sonya Eddy as Security lady
- Tom Kenny as Man wrapping gift

== Production ==
In May 2001, it was announced that Ben Affleck was in talks to star in Surviving Christmas when the project was at Columbia Pictures.

== Release ==
=== Box office ===
Surviving Christmas opened theatrically on October 22, 2004, in 2,750 venues, earning $4,441,356 in its opening weekend and ranking seventh in the North American box office and second among the week's new releases. The film ended its run on November 23, 2004, with $11,663,156 domestically and $3,457,644 overseas for a worldwide total of $15,120,800.

=== Critical response ===
On the review aggregator website Rotten Tomatoes, 8% of 116 critics' reviews are positive, with an average rating of 3.4/10. The website's consensus reads: "Surviving Christmas is unpleasant characters attacking each other for 90 minutes before delivering a typical, hollow anti-consumerist message" Metacritic, which uses a weighted average, assigned the film a score of 19 out of 100, based on 29 critics, indicating "overwhelming dislike". Audiences polled by CinemaScore gave the film an average grade of "C+" on an A+ to F scale.

Writing in Entertainment Weekly, Lisa Schwarzbaum said, "Really, critics and audiences ought to turn thoughts and wallets discreetly away from Surviving Christmas, ignoring the sight as if Santa had just stepped in droppings from Donner and Blitzen." In The New York Times, Stephen Holden concluded, "This is a film that perversely refuses to trust its own comic instincts. Perhaps out of a fear of not having enough jokes, it throws in extra subplots and unnecessary characters to keep the pace frantic, and the action muddled."

=== Home media ===
The film was released on DVD on December 21, 2004, by DreamWorks Home Entertainment, two months after its theatrical release. During February 2006, Viacom (now known as Paramount Skydance) acquired the rights to Surviving Christmas and all 58 other live-action films DreamWorks had released since 1997, following its billion-dollar acquisition of the studio's live-action film assets and television assets. In August 2017, it was released on Blu-ray by Paramount Home Entertainment. On November 9, 2021, Paramount Home Entertainment released it on a triple feature DVD set titled Naughty Holiday 3-Movie Collection, which also included Office Christmas Party and Bad Santa (a Miramax film Paramount acquired the rights to in 2020).

=== Accolades ===
The film was nominated for three Golden Raspberry Awards at the 2005 ceremony:

- Golden Raspberry Award for Worst Picture (lost to Catwoman)
- Golden Raspberry Award for Worst Actor (Affleck; lost to George W. Bush in Fahrenheit 9/11)
- Golden Raspberry Award for Worst Screenplay (lost to Catwoman)

== See also ==
- List of Christmas films
