= 'Round Springfield =

- The Simpsons episode
- Episode no.: Season 6 Episode 22
- Directed by: Steven Dean Moore
- Story by: Al Jean; Mike Reiss
- Teleplay by: Joshua Sternin; Jennifer Ventimilia
- Production code: 2F32
- Original air date: April 30, 1995

Guest appearances
- Steve Allen as himself; Phil Hartman as Lionel Hutz; Ron Taylor as Oscar "Bleeding Gums" Murphy; Marcia Wallace as Edna Krabappel

Episode features
- Chalkboard gag: "Nerve gas is not a toy"
- Couch gag: The family's heights are reversed; Maggie is now the largest while Homer is the smallest.
- Commentary: Al Jean; Mike Reiss; Joshua Sternin; Jennifer Ventimilia; Steven Dean Moore

Episode chronology
← Previous "The PTA Disbands"	Next → "The Springfield Connection"
- The Simpsons season 6

"'Round Springfield" is the twenty-second episode of the sixth season of the American animated television series The Simpsons. It originally aired on Fox in the United States on April 30, 1995. In the episode, Bart (Nancy Cartwright) is hospitalized after eating a piece of jagged metal in his Krusty-O's cereal and sues Krusty the Clown (Dan Castellaneta). While visiting Bart, Lisa (Yeardley Smith) discovers her old mentor, jazz musician Oscar "Bleeding Gums" Murphy, is also in the hospital. When he dies suddenly, she resolves to honor his memory. Steve Allen (as himself) and Ron Taylor (as "Bleeding Gums" Murphy) guest star, each in his second appearance on the show. Dan Higgins also returns as the writer and performer of all of Lisa and Bleeding Gums' saxophone solos.

The episode was written by Joshua Sternin and Jennifer Ventimilia – based on a story idea by Al Jean and Mike Reiss – and was the first episode directed by Steven Dean Moore. Jean and Reiss, who were previously the series' showrunners, returned to produce this episode (as well as "A Star Is Burns") to ease the workload of the show's regular staff. They worked on it alongside the staff of The Critic, the series they had left The Simpsons to create. The episode marks the series' first time that a recurring character was killed off, something the staff had considered for a while, ushering in a period of character changes beginning with Lisa's conversion to vegetarianism in "Lisa the Vegetarian". The episode features numerous cultural references, including Carole King's song "Jazzman", the actor James Earl Jones and the Kimba the White Lion/The Lion King controversy.

The episode also features the phrase "cheese-eating surrender monkeys", used by Groundskeeper Willie to describe the French. The phrase has since entered the public lexicon. It has been used and referenced by journalists and academics, and it appears in two Oxford quotation dictionaries.

== Plot ==
Bart gets a stomach ache after accidentally eating a jagged metal Krusty-O prize packed in his breakfast cereal. Thinking Bart is feigning illness to avoid a history test, Homer and Marge send him to school anyway. After Bart struggles through the test, Mrs. Krabappel eventually allows him to walk to the nurse's office, but Bart soon collapses moments after his arrival, which was staffed by Lunchlady Doris as a result of budget cuts. He is taken to Springfield General Hospital, where he undergoes appendicitis surgery from Dr. Hibbert and Dr. Nick.

While visiting Bart in the hospital, Lisa discovers her hero, jazzman Oscar "Bleeding Gums" Murphy, is a patient in another ward. Murphy tells Lisa his life story; he learned his jazz from Blind Willie Witherspoon, then got his big break appearing on Tonight Starring Steve Allen (though instead of Murphy performing a solo spot, Allen proceeds to recite poetry and promote his books over Murphy's playing leading him to walk off), but was left penniless after having exhausted the royalties from his only album, Sax on the Beach, on a $1,500-a-day Fabergé egg habit, though he made one last shot at a comeback with a guest spot on The Cosby Show in 1986.

Lisa spends time with Murphy, who lends her his saxophone for a school recital. Due to Bart's classmates demanding to have appendectomies of their own, the orchestra is left with only three students at the recital; Lisa, Martin and Ralph. The recital is a success after Lisa's improvisation is a hit with the crowd, but when she returns to the hospital to visit Bleeding Gums, she learns he has died, leaving her devastated. At Bleeding Gums' funeral, Lisa is the only person who attends, while Reverend Lovejoy misnames him and misidentifies him, and Lisa ultimately vows to make sure that everyone in Springfield appreciates Bleeding Gums' musical legacy. Meanwhile, Bart sues Krusty the Clown and is given a $100,000 settlement. After Bart's attorney Lionel Hutz deducts his legal fees, Bart is left with only $500.

Still stricken with grief, Lisa decides that the best way to honor Bleeding Gums' memory is by having his album played on the local jazz station. Lisa spots it at the Android's Dungeon for $250; after hearing that Bleeding Gums is dead, Comic Book Guy doubles the price to $500. As she leaves, Bart arrives with his $500 settlement to buy a pog with Steve Allen's face. After seeing his sister's sad face through the shop window, Bart buys Lisa the album because she was the only one who believed his stomach ache was real. When she says he will never again see $500, Bart shows her a box of new Krusty-Os with flesh-eating bacteria, which he intends to eat and sue Krusty again with.

When the radio station plays one of Bleeding Gums' songs, Lisa is disappointed because the station's tiny range prevents anyone from hearing it. Lightning strikes the antenna, giving it extra power and projecting it into every radio in Springfield. Lisa is finally satisfied, saying, "That was for you, Bleeding Gums.", just as Bleeding Gums appears from the heavens to tell Lisa that she has made "an old jazz man happy". After saying their final goodbyes, Lisa and Bleeding Gums perform "Jazzman" one last time.

== Production ==
"'Round Springfield" was written by Joshua Sternin and Jennifer Ventimilia, based on a story idea by Al Jean and Mike Reiss. It was the first episode directed by Steven Dean Moore. Due to Fox's demand for 24 to 25 episodes per season, which the production staff found impossible to meet, two episodes of each season were written and produced by former showrunners, to relieve the stress on The Simpsons' writing staff. Jean and Reiss, who were showrunners for the show's third and fourth seasons, returned to produce the episode, as well as "A Star Is Burns", instead of the season's main showrunner David Mirkin. On both episodes, they were aided by the staff of The Critic, the show the two left The Simpsons to create. Sternin and Ventimilia were writers on The Critic and were big fans of The Simpsons, so were thrilled to be able to write an episode.

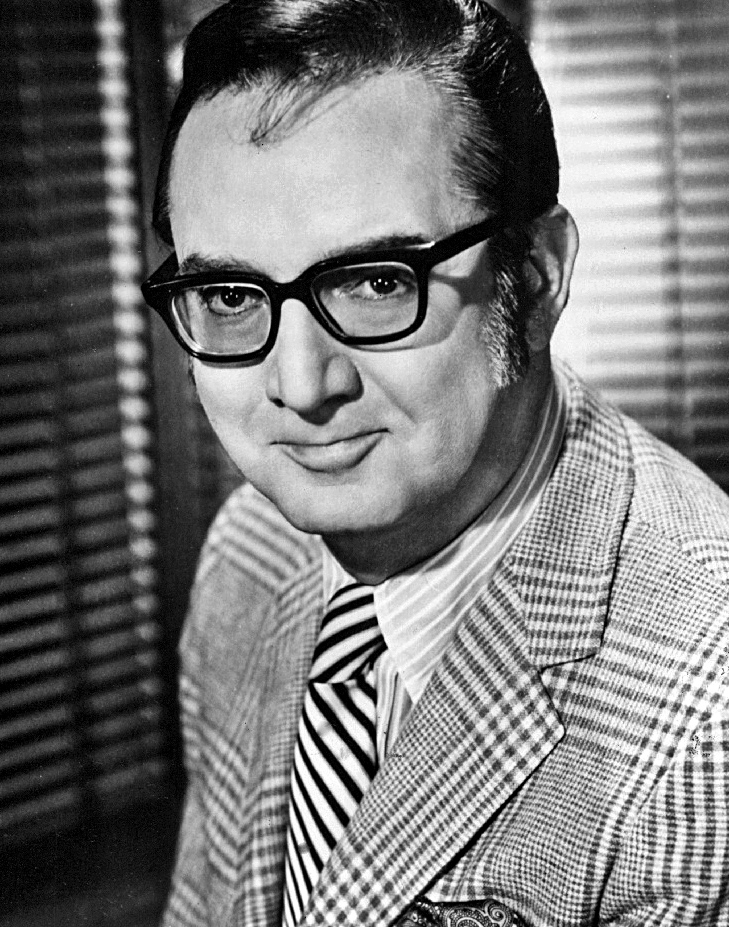
Steve Allen made his second guest appearance in the episode.

The episode marked the first time a recurring character has been killed off on the show. The writers and production team felt that it would be a good, emotional storyline, which, through Lisa, could focus on the theme of grief. They decided that it could not be one of the main characters; Jean joked that "we wouldn't want it to be someone like Mr. Burns, that we'd obviously want to see in the show again". Eventually, Jean decided on Bleeding Gums Murphy, a character introduced in the season one episode "Moaning Lisa"; a flashback to "Moaning Lisa" is featured in the episode. Murphy was a fairly minor character, only appearing in a couple of episodes, but he appeared in the show's opening sequence and remained there after the episode, until the opening was re-designed in season 20. Moore's first ever job on the show was in the animation department for "Moaning Lisa" so he "appreciated" being able to direct the episode. Reiss stated, "I had been polling for years to kill Marge's mom but this was a better idea". Actor Ron Taylor returned to guest star as Murphy in the episode. Comedian Steve Allen also made his second guest appearance on the show, having previously appeared in the episode "Separate Vocations".

The main story of the episode's first act sees Bart get appendicitis from eating a jagged metal Krusty-O. Mike Reiss's father, being a doctor, "sort of" acted as the medical consultant on the episode. He stated that it is impossible to get appendicitis from eating a piece of metal, but the writers decided to do it anyway.

In his flashback, Murphy is shown as having a "$1,500 a day Fabergé egg habit". Al Jean "didn't realize just how expensive" Fabergé eggs actually were (in 2013, a collector revealed he spent just over $100 million to purchase nine Fabergé eggs), so the joke does not make much sense.

== Cultural references ==
The title is a play on both Thelonious Monk's jazz standard 'Round Midnight and Bertrand Tavernier's similarly named film, also about an unappreciated jazz musician. When a deceased Bleeding Gums Murphy appears to Lisa in a cloud towards the end of the episode, he is joined by Mufasa from The Lion King, Darth Vader from the Star Wars saga and James Earl Jones representing his announcing work on CNN. Although all three roles were originally portrayed by Jones, the characters in this scene were impersonated by Harry Shearer; Jones himself guest starred in "Treehouse of Horror" and "Treehouse of Horror V". Additionally, Mufasa accidentally mentions "Kimba" and corrects himself by saying "Simba". This is a reference to the debate regarding The Lion King's resemblance to the anime Kimba the White Lion. Lisa and Bleeding Gums play Carole King's song "Jazzman" in this scene and in the hospital earlier in the episode. Bleeding Gums has to leave at the end of the scene because he has a date with the jazz singer Billie Holiday.

Additionally, Homer has a Starland Vocal Band tattoo on his arm, Bart considers buying a Steve Allen "ultimate pog", and the music heard just before Bart's operation is a parody of the theme music of ER. Bleeding Gums appears on an episode of The Cosby Show, a reference to Bill Cosby often getting jazz musicians he liked to appear on the show; in the episode, Cosby is voiced by The Simpsons regular Dan Castellaneta. Lionel Hutz's "crack team of lawyers", Robert Shaporo and Albert Dershman, are parodies of Robert Shapiro and Alan Dershowitz, two of the defense attorneys at the O. J. Simpson murder case. The three drive away in a white pickup truck, similar to the Ford Bronco that Al Cowlings and O. J. Simpson drove in their televised low-speed pursuit before Simpson's arrest.

== Reception ==
In its original broadcast, "'Round Springfield" finished 60th in the ratings for the week of April 24 to April 30, 1995, with a Nielsen rating of 8.2. The episode was the fourth highest rated show on the Fox network that week.

Mike Reiss and Al Jean thought that the episode would "get a ton of awards", and joked that this was why they opted to receive a story credit, which they usually would not. Ultimately it did not win any awards.

Gary Russell and Gareth Roberts, the authors of the book I Can't Believe It's a Bigger and Better Updated Unofficial Simpsons Guide, found that it was "a real tear-jerker" and praised Grampa believing everything he saw was death. In a DVD review of the sixth season, Ryan Keefer of DVD Verdict rated the episode a "B".

Adam Finley of TV Squad praised the episode, noting its many "great moments" including "Steve Allen pimping his books on TV: How to Make Love to Steve Allen; Happiness is a Naked Steve Allen; Journey to the Center of Steve Allen; The Joy of Cooking Steve Allen" and "Moe running a "retox" clinic right next to a detox clinic".

The podcast Put it in H - A Die Hard Simpsons Podcast praised the episode for its "high number of laughs per minute while still being full of heart".

However, Colin Jacobson of DVD Movie Guide called the episode "dull", stating that "some of the moments connected to Bart's illness are funny", but that he "really hate[s] that 'Jazzman' song" and dislikes "the Bleeding Gums parts".

=== Cheese-eating surrender monkeys ===
In the episode, budget cuts at Springfield Elementary School force the janitor Groundskeeper Willie to be used as a French teacher. Expressing his disdain for the French, he exclaims to his class: "Bonjourrrrr, you cheese-eatin' surrender monkeys." The quote, particularly the phrase "cheese-eating surrender monkeys", has since entered wider use. It was used particularly in the run-up to the war in Iraq, having been popularized by the conservative National Review journalist Jonah Goldberg, to describe European and especially French opposition to military action. A piece in The Guardian noted that the phrase was "made acceptable in official diplomatic channels around the globe". Ben Macintyre has written that the phrase is "perhaps the most famous" of the show's coinages and since Goldberg's usage it "has gone on to become a journalistic cliché".

It has subsequently been used by the New York Post (as "Surrender Monkeys") as the headline for its December 7, 2006, front page, referring to the Iraq Study Group and its recommendation that U.S. soldiers be withdrawn from Iraq by early 2008. The Daily Telegraph has cited it in relation to Anglo-French military cooperation. The term has been used in books by commentator Laura Ingraham, and academics Stuart Croft, Stephen Chan, and Paul L. Moorcraft and Philip M. Taylor. Ned Sherrin included the quote in the Oxford Dictionary of Humorous Quotations; it was introduced in the third edition in 2005. It is also included in the Oxford Dictionary of Modern Quotations. Douglas Coupland's 2009 novel Generation A refers to Groundskeeper Willie's use of the phrase.

The line was written by Ken Keeler during one of the episode's re-write sessions, although none of those present on the episode's DVD audio commentary could remember for sure. According to Reiss, Keeler called it his "greatest contribution to the show." The writers were surprised it became as widely used as it did and never meant it as a political statement, merely as an "obnoxious" joke for Willie. The French dub of the show uses the line "singes mangeurs de fromage", omitting the word "surrender".
