= Small Fortune =

- Genre: Game show
- Presented by: Dermot O'Leary
- Narrated by: Brian Blessed
- Country of origin: United Kingdom
- Original language: English
- No. of series: 1
- No. of episodes: 6

Production
- Production location: Pinewood Studios
- Running time: 60 minutes
- Production company: Youngest Media

Original release
- Network: ITV
- Release: 2 February – 9 March 2019

Small Fortune is a British game show which aired on ITV between 2 February and 9 March 2019.

== Gameplay ==
Teams of three contestants are tasked with completing dexterity-intensive challenges taking place within miniature scale models of real-world locations. The nominated contestant is allowed only one attempt, with each completed challenge adding a maximum of £50,000 to a jackpot. The contestant is allowed one free practice attempt, but each additional attempt deducts 10% from the round's pot.

Whichever team wins the best of five challenges must play one more challenge to claim the jackpot. All team members who complete their respective challenge are eligible to attempt the final challenge; as before, each contestant receives one free practice and one attempt at the challenge (with each additional practice deducting 10% from the total jackpot).

== International adaptations ==
On 3 April 2019, NBC ordered an American version of Small Fortune, co-produced by Universal Television Alternative. On 23 June 2020, NBC announced that actor and comedian Lil Rel Howery would host and executive produce, with production beginning in late 2020. It premiered on 31 May 2021 and ended on 19 July 2021.

On 16 January 2020, the format was sold to South Korea's TVN, with a four-episode order.
