= Joshua Sternin =

American television producer and writer

Joshua Sternin is an American television producer and screenwriter.

== Career ==
Among Sternin's producer credits include 23 episodes of Murphy Brown in 1996 through 1997 and as writer for 10 of them, as well as producer for 64 episodes of That '70s Show in 1998 through 2001 and as a writer for 8 of them. In 2002, he and Jennifer Ventimilia created a show for Fox called The Grubbs, starring Randy Quaid. Due to negative critical reaction, the show was canceled before it went on air.

Sternin wrote The Simpsons episode "Simpson Tide" (with Ventimilia as his co-writer) and the teleplay of the episode "'Round Springfield", based on a story idea by Al Jean and Mike Reiss. He co-wrote the screenplay for the 2004 film Surviving Christmas and the 2010 film Tooth Fairy. He also worked on the 2010 film Yogi Bear, and was one of the lead screenwriters for the 2011 animated film Rio. He also served as an executive producer and writer for Kitchen Confidential for Fox, and Robot and Monster, and Teenage Mutant Ninja Turtles for Nickelodeon.

He also has a writing career on Wattpad, where he has written 5 works under the pseudonym AaronRubicon.

== Awards ==
In 2004, Sternin was nominated for a Golden Raspberry for Worst Screenplay for Surviving Christmas.

In 2009, Sternin was nominated for a Streamy Award for Best Directing for a Comedy Web Series for Overkill: A Love Story. He has also won 2 consecutive Watty Awards.
