= Small Fortune (American game show) =

American television game show

- Genre: Game show; Comedy; Family
- Presented by: Lil Rel Howery
- Country of origin: United States
- Original language: English
- No. of seasons: 1
- No. of episodes: 6

Production
- Executive producers: Lil Rel Howery; Lucas Church; David Flynn; Steve Barry; Joe Braswell
- Production companies: Universal Television Alternative; Youngest Media

Original release
- Network: NBC
- Release: May 31 – July 19, 2021

Small Fortune is an American television game show hosted by Lil Rel Howery. It premiered on NBC on May 31, 2021, at 10:00 P.M. ET. It was canceled after one season on January 20, 2022. This series is an adaptation on a British TV series with the same name.

== Premise ==
In each episode, teams of three from various backgrounds, from first responders to Olympians from around the country, work together to earn a shot at competing for the $250,000 cash prize in the "Big Little Heist" finale game.

Each team must prove their skills on these miniature playing fields from a shrunken sushi conveyor belt to a mini Ellis Island. These challenges will require intense focus because with games this small, there's no room for mistakes as the slightest miscalculation or tremble may result in losing thousands of dollars.

== Episodes ==
No.	Title	Original release date	U.S. viewers (millions)	Rating (18–49)
1	"Semper Fly"	May 31, 2021	1.47	0.3
2	"Grandma Knows Best"	June 7, 2021	1.35	0.3
3	"Team USA"	June 14, 2021	1.24	0.3
4	"For Better or Nurse"	June 28, 2021	1.39	0.3
5	"Fam Chowda"	July 12, 2021	1.46	0.3
6	"Three Patels"	July 19, 2021	1.47	0.3

== Production ==
On April 3, 2019, NBC ordered an American adaptation of Small Fortune, produced by Youngest Media and co-produced by Universal Television Alternative. On June 23, 2020, NBC announced that the actor and comedian Lil Rel Howery would host and be executive producer, with production beginning in late 2020. This show premiered on May 31, 2021. On January 20, 2022, NBC reported the show had been canceled after one season.

== Other broadcasts ==
In Canada, Small Fortune is simulcast by Global.
