= The Grubbs =

Unaired American sitcom

- Genre: Sitcom
- Based on: The Grimleys by Granada Television
- Developed by: Marcy Ross
- Starring: Carol Kane; Michael Cera; Randy Quaid
- No. of seasons: 1
- No. of episodes: 8

Production
- Executive producers: Joshua Sternin; Jennifer Ventimilia
- Production companies: Granada Entertainment USA; Studios USA

Original release
- Network: Fox

The Grubbs is an unaired American sitcom. Based on the British sitcom The Grimleys, it starred Michael Cera as Mitchell Grubb, Randy Quaid as his father, and Carol Kane as his mother. It would have premiered on November 3, 2002, but was cancelled two days before its planned premiere.

== History ==
The Grubbs was announced by Fox in May 2002, and was intended to premiere on November 3 of that year in Fox's 9:30 PM Sunday time slot, right after Malcolm in the Middle. The series was co-produced by Granada Entertainment USA and 20th Century Fox Television, in a partnership with Universal Television. In a statement when the series was originally announced, Granada Entertainment USA president Antony Root said, "With vivid characters, sharp writing and irreverent humour, The Grubbs has all the makings of a great success for Fox." But although Fox had originally ordered thirteen episodes of the series, in September 2002 they announced this would be reduced to eight, and the series ended up being cancelled in November 2002, two days before the show would have premiered.

Although no episodes of The Grubbs were ever aired, the series did help Cera land an audition for the sitcom Arrested Development, in which he played George Michael Bluth. The Grubbs also served as Cera's debut playing a role on American network television.

== Plot ==
Like The Grimleys, The Grubbs revolved around an underachieving, blue-collar family. But while The Grimleys was set in Dudley, West Midlands, England in the 1970s, The Grubbs was set in the present day in the fictitious American town of Hackville. Joshua Sternin, the Grubbs' executive producer, said that Hackville is located in America's "Steel Belt". He also said that Hackville was inspired by the western part of Pennsylvania and by the state's city of Allentown.

== Cast ==
| Actor | Character in the Grubbs | Original character in the Grimleys |
|---|---|---|
| Michael Cera | Mitchell Grubb | Gordon Grimley |
| Randy Quaid | Mac Grubb | Baz Grimley |
| Carol Kane | Sophie Grubb | Janet Grimley |
| Lori Rom | Miss Krenetsky | Miss Titley |

== Critical response ==
Critical response to the Grubbs was highly negative. David Bianculli, writing for the New York Daily News, described it as "live-action Simpsons, but without the wit and warmth". It was ranked the worst new fall series of 2002 in a Daily Variety poll of television critics. In a July 29, 2002 San Francisco Chronicle column, Tim Goodman wrote that the series "...did unite critical consensus: It's probably the worst show of the season. Maybe several seasons." Similarly, Scott D. Pierce of Deseret News described the series as "incredibly awful" and "painfully unfunny".
