= List of British television series based on American television series =

Although most United States-made television series are directly exported to the United Kingdom using the original production and cast, some successful shows have been remade for the British market.

The following list include American TV shows and concepts remade for a British audience.

| American original | British remake | Notes |
|---|---|---|
| The $1,000,000 Chance of a Lifetime | All Clued Up | |
| The $64,000 Question | The $64,000 Question | |
| America's Next Top Model | Britain's Next Top Model | |
| American Gladiators | Gladiators (1992) | |
| American Gladiators | Gladiators (2008) | |
| American Gladiators | Gladiators (2024) | |
| The Apprentice | The Apprentice | American version aired in the United Kingdom on BBC Three is known as The Apprentice USA. British version aired on BBC America is known as Mark Burnett's The Apprentice UK. |
| Are You Smarter than a 5th Grader? | Are You Smarter than a 10 Year Old? | |
| Beauty and the Geek | Beauty and the Geek | |
| Betty White's Off Their Rockers | Off Their Rockers | |
| Blockbusters | Blockbusters | |
| Candid Camera | Candid Camera | |
| Card Sharks | Play Your Cards Right | |
| Catch Phrase | Catchphrase | |
| College Bowl | University Challenge | |
| The Dating Game | Blind Date | |
| The Disney Club | The Disney Club | The original British opening titles and theme music were based on those of The Disney Afternoon. |
| Don't Forget the Lyrics! | Don't Forget the Lyrics! | |
| Double Dare | Double Dare | British version usually broadcast as a segment within Going Live! |
| Drunk History | Drunk History | |
| Family Feud | Family Fortunes | |
| Finders Keepers | Finders Keepers | |
| Fun House | Fun House | |
| Gambit | Gambit | |
| The Golden Girls | The Brighton Belles | |
| Good Times | The Fosters | |
| Greed | Greed | |
| Grounded for Life | In with the Flynns | |
| Hollywood Squares | Celebrity Squares | |
| Impractical Jokers | Impractical Jokers UK | |
| Jeopardy! | Jeopardy! | |
| Jersey Shore | Geordie Shore | |
| Law & Order | Law & Order: UK | |
| Lingo | Lingo | |
| Mad About You | Loved By You | |
| Married... with Children | Married for Life | |
| Match Game | Blankety Blank | |
| Maude | Nobody's Perfect | |
| Murder in Small Town X | The Murder Game | |
| Name That Tune | Name That Tune | |
| The Name's the Same | The Name's the Same | |
| Now You See It | Now You See It | |
| Pimp My Ride | Pimp My Ride UK | Including Pimp Madonna's Ride - pimping a VW Van for Madonna's "Sorry" music video, and a Comic Relief Pimp My Red Nose Ride special. |
| The Price Is Right | The Price Is Right | |
| Pyramid | The Pyramid Game | |
| RuPaul's Drag Race | RuPaul's Drag Race UK | |
| Sale of the Century | Sale of the Century | |
| Saturday Night Live | Saturday Live / Friday Night Live Saturday Night Live UK | |
| Sesame Street | Sesame Tree | |
| Sesame Street | The Furchester Hotel | |
| Sid Caesar Invites You | Sid Caesar Invites You | |
| So You Think You Can Dance | So You Think You Can Dance | Reality competition. Same host (Cat Deeley), and both versions feature Nigel Lythgoe as a judge. |
| The Soup | Celebrity Soup | |
| Starting from Scratch | Close to Home | |
| Strike It Rich | Strike It Lucky | |
| Supermarket Sweep | Supermarket Sweep | |
| Superstars | Superstars | |
| The Taste | The Taste | Reality competition. Same judges. |
| Teen Mom | Teen Mom UK | |
| That '70s Show | Days Like These | |
| This Is Your Life | This Is Your Life | |
| The View | Loose Women | |
| The Wall | The Wall | |
| What's My Line? | What's My Line? | |
| Wheel of Fortune | Wheel of Fortune | |
| Who's the Boss? | The Upper Hand | |
| Win Ben Stein's Money | Win Beadle's Money | |
| Win, Lose or Draw | Win, Lose or Draw | |
| Wipeout (1988) | Wipeout | |
| Wipeout (2008) | Total Wipeout | American version aired in the United Kingdom on Watch as Total Wipeout USA. |
| Jimmy Kimmel Live!, The Tonight Show, Late Night, Last Call with Carson Daly, The Late Show, The Late Late Show | The Nightly Show | Aired 40 episodes on ITV. |

== See also ==
- List of American television series based on British television series
