= Jennifer Ventimilia =

American screenwriter

Jennifer Ventimilia (previously Jeffrey Ventimilia and also known as J.R. Ventimilia) is an American screenwriter. Ventimilia co-wrote The Simpsons episode "Simpson Tide" (with Joshua Sternin) and the teleplay of the episode "'Round Springfield", based on a story idea by Al Jean and Mike Reiss. Other credits include Murphy Brown, That '70s Show, and The Critic. In 2002, Ventimilia and Sternin created a show for Fox called The Grubbs, starring Randy Quaid. Due to negative critical reaction, the show was canceled before it went on air. Ventimilia co-wrote the screenplay for the 2004 film Surviving Christmas and the 2010 film Tooth Fairy and she also served as an executive producer and writer for Kitchen Confidential, Robot and Monster, and the 2012 Nickelodeon reboot of Teenage Mutant Ninja Turtles.

Ventimilia is a trans woman, having transitioned in 2013.
