= Format Recognition and Protection Association =

The Format Recognition and Protection Association (FRAPA) is a trade association that seeks to create and enforce legal protection for television formats as intellectual property, and to mediate industry disputes.

FRAPA co-sponsors the C21 Media International Format Awards.
