= Robert Uvedale =

English cleric teacher and horticulturist

Dr Robert Uvedale (1642–1722) was an English cleric teacher and horticulturist. He ran a grammar and boarding school north of London, took part in botanical exchanges, and published as a classical scholar.

== Life ==
Son of Robert Uvedale of Westminster, he was born in the parish of St. Margaret's, Westminster, on 25 May 1642. He was educated at St. Peter's College, Westminster, under Richard Busby, having probably as contemporaries John Locke, John Dryden and Leonard Plukenet. At the funeral of Oliver Cromwell in 1658 Uvedale is said to have snatched one of the escutcheons from the bier, which was preserved in his family. In April 1659 Uvedale was elected queen's scholar of Trinity College, Cambridge, his name being then registered as Udall. He was elected Fellow of Trinity College in 1664, and is said to have been first a divinity fellow, and afterwards a law fellow.

Between 1663 and 1665 Uvedale became master of Enfield Grammar School in Enfield, Middlesex, and took a lease of the manor-house commonly called Queen Elizabeth's Palace (later the Palace School), in order to take boarders. During the Great Plague of 1665 the whole of Uvedale's household escaped the disease, owing, it was thought, to their inhaling the vapour of vinegar poured over a red-hot brick. In 1676 it was made a ground of complaint against Uvedale that he neglected the grammar school for his boarders, his opponents making the further charge against him of having obtained an appointment as an actor and comedian at the Theatre Royal from the lord chamberlain to protect himself from the writ of execution. Among his pupils were Henry Hare, 3rd Baron Coleraine; Francis Hastings, 10th Earl of Huntingdon; Robert Needham, 8th Viscount Kilmorey, who died at the school in 1717; Sir Jeremy Sambroke, William Sloane, and another nephew of Sir Hans Sloane.

Uvedale, who had proceeded M.A. in 1666, became LL.D. of Cambridge in 1682. In 1696 his neighbour, Archbishop John Tillotson, appointed Uvedale to the rectory of Orpington, Kent, with the chapelry of St Mary Cray, but he appears not to have resided. He died at Enfield on 17 August 1722, and was buried in the parish church.

== Horticulture ==
As a horticulturist Uvedale earned a reputation for his skill in cultivating exotics, being one of the earliest possessors of hothouses in England. In John Nichols's Literary Illustrations are sixty letters from Uvedale to Richard Richardson of North Bierley, dated between 1695 and 1721, mainly referring to the exchange of plants.

== Works ==
Uvedale was invited to contribute the life of Dion to the translation of Plutarch, edited by Dryden, Somers, and others, published between 1683 and 1686. Uvedale's portion appeared in 1684.

== Legacy ==
After his death Uvedale's growing plants were mostly sold to Sir Robert Walpole for his collection at Houghton Hall. His herbarium, in fourteen thick volumes, forms vols. 302–15 of the Sloane collection. It contains plants not only from Sherard, Richardson, Petiver, Plukenet, Robart, Rand, Dale, Doody, Sloane, and Du Bois, but also from Tournefort, Magnol, Vaillant, and other continental botanists, labelled by Uvedale. Petiver founded a genus Uvedalia in Uvedale's honour, which, however, became Polymnia Uvedalia of Linné, and Robert Brown gave the same name to a genus, Uvedalia, of Australian plants, merged by De Candolle into the genus Mimulus, and resurrected in 2012.

== Family ==
Uvedale married Mary (1656–1740), second daughter of Edward Stephens of Charrington, Gloucestershire, granddaughter of Sir Matthew Hale. By her he had five daughters and three sons:

- Robert Uvedale, D.D., fellow of Trinity College, Cambridge, vicar of Enfield from 1721 till his death in 1731;
- James Uvedale, M.A., rector of Bishop's Cleeve, Gloucestershire; and
- Samuel Uvedale, B.A., rector of Barking, Suffolk, and father of Admiral Samuel Uvedale, who served with Lord Rodney.

== Notes ==
Attribution

This article incorporates text from a publication now in the public domain: "Uvedale, Robert". Dictionary of National Biography. London: Smith, Elder & Co. 1885–1900.
