= UglyChristmasSweater.com =

American Christmas clothing company

- Type: Private, family owned
- Industry: Clothing production and retail
- Founded: 2012
- Founder: Fred Hajjar; Mark Hajjar
- Headquarters: Walled Lake, Michigan
- Areas served: United States
- Products: Clothing
- Number of employees: 48
- Website: www.uglychristmassweater.com

UglyChristmasSweater.com is an American holiday apparel company based in Michigan that specializes in ugly Christmas sweaters both online and through retail locations. The company is owned by brothers Fred and Mark Hajjar, headquartered in Walled Lake, Michigan, has 48 employees and a warehouse that spans 42,000 feet.

== History ==
UglyChristmasSweater.com was founded in 2012. The company was the first to introduce a customizable ugly Christmas sweater where visitors can create their own customized Ugly Christmas Sweater by selecting patterns, colors and uploading a photo of their choosing.

UglyChristmasSweater.com has teamed up with notable companies including Uber, and have launched charity fund-raising initiatives in collaboration with the designers/contestants of the Bravo/Lifetime Network reality-series Project Runaway as well as the designers of the SyFy Network reality series Face Off. These efforts, all raising funds to benefit the likes of such charitable organizations as Arthritis.org, Leave No Paws Behind, Toys For Tots, and The Scleroderma Foundation.
