= Text Santa =

- Presented by: Holly Willoughby; Phillip Schofield; Declan Donnelly; Michelle Visage; Anthony McPartlin; Christine Bleakley; Paddy McGuinness; Alesha Dixon; Brian Dowling; Caroline Flack; Olly Murs
- Opening theme: "Text Santa" theme by A-MNEMONIC Music
- Composer: Jonny Vere
- Country of origin: United Kingdom
- Original language: English

Production
- Production location: The London Studios
- Production company: ITV Studios

Original release
- Network: ITV
- Release: 11 December 2011 – 25 December 2015

Related
- From the Heart, ITV Telethon

Text Santa was a charity initiative set up in 2011 by ITV to support UK-based charities during the Christmas period. The appeal to the public is to donate money mainly via text donation and profits from merchandise. The telethons have been hosted by popular ITV presenters including Phillip Schofield, Christine Bleakley, and Ant & Dec. The 2015 appeal show was the last after ITV decided to axe the show to make way for an all-year appeal.

== Music ==
The Text Santa 2015 appeal theme music was created by London-based music production company A-MNEMONIC Music Official Website. In previous years, the theme music that was used was created by British composer Leigh Haggerwood of The Florin Street Band, who re-worked his Christmas song "My Favourite Time of Year" especially for the appeal, creating theme and background music along with various other original compositions. The song – with its sweeping string melodies and critically acclaimed Victorian-themed music video has gained worldwide popularity and was recently performed by the United States Army Band in Washington D.C. Leigh Haggerwood is proud of the songs association with the Text Santa campaign and has pledged to support it each year. "My Favourite Time of Year" was not used for the 2015 appeal.

=== Official single ===
In 2013, the cast of The Big Reunion released a cover of "I Wish It Could Be Christmas Everyday", with all proceeds going to the Text Santa charities. The single peaked at 21 in the UK singles charts.

== Branding ==
At launch in 2011, Text Santa was promoted with a group of eight mascots named "Santa's Little Helpers". The package was a collaboration between Lambie-Nairn and famed animation studio Aardman Animations.

== Charities ==
All of the money raised gets split between the charities supported by the appeal. In 2011, there were nine chosen charities, in 2012, 2013 and 2014, there were six and in 2015, there were three.

2011	2012	2013	2014	2015
Age UK				Macmillan Cancer Support
Crisis	Anthony Nolan	BeatBullying	The Guide Dogs for the Blind Association	Make-A-Wish Foundation
Carers UK		Save the Children	Carers UK	Save the Children
Samaritans	Marie Curie Cancer Care	British Heart Foundation	Teenage Cancer Trust	—N/a
WRVS	Together for Short Lives	CLIC Sargent	Together for Short Lives	—N/a
Great Ormond Street Hospital	Whizz-Kidz	Help the Hospices	WellChild	—N/a
The Noah's Ark Appeal	—N/a	—N/a	—N/a	—N/a
Helping Hand	—N/a	—N/a	—N/a	—N/a
Yorkhill Children's Foundation	—N/a	—N/a	—N/a	—N/a

== Overview ==
=== Presenters ===
No.	Broadcast date	Total raised	Presenters	ITV rating (millions)
1	11 December 2011 (launch show); 24 December 2011 (main show)	£4,200,000	Phillip Schofield (launch show); Christine Bleakley (launch show); Anthony McPartlin; Declan Donnelly; Holly Willoughby	3.79 (launch show); 3.87
2	21 December 2012	£5,500,000	Phillip Schofield; Christine Bleakley; Anthony McPartlin; Declan Donnelly; Holly Willoughby; Paddy McGuinness	4.82
3	20 December 2013	£5,100,000	Phillip Schofield; Christine Bleakley; Anthony McPartlin; Declan Donnelly; Holly Willoughby; Paddy McGuinness	4.41
4	19 December 2014	£6,200,000	Phillip Schofield; Christine Bleakley; Anthony McPartlin; Declan Donnelly; Paddy McGuinness; Alesha Dixon	3.86
5	18 December 2015	£11,000,000	Phillip Schofield; Christine Bleakley; Holly Willoughby; Paddy McGuinness; Alesha Dixon; Stephen Mulhern; Amanda Holden; Caroline Flack; Olly Murs	3.23

== 2011 appeal ==
The 2011 appeal aired in two parts. The launch show aired on 11 December 2011 and was hosted by Phillip Schofield and Christine Bleakley. The main show aired on Christmas Eve (24 December 2011) with Ant & Dec and Holly Willoughby as presenters.

Show	Date	Timeslots	Presenters
Launch show	11 December 2011	21:30–22:35	Phillip Schofield; Christine Bleakley
Main show	24 December 2011	19:30–21:00	Ant & Dec
Main show	24 December 2011	21:00–22:00	Holly Willoughby

Events

- On 27 November 2011, at The Kia Oval Cricket Ground, thousands of people attempted a Guinness World Record for the largest Santa gathering. entertained the participants. However, not enough people turned out for the record attempt of 13,200 Santas.

== 2012 appeal ==
The 2012 telethon aired live on 21 December 2012. The first hour of the telethon was hosted by Ant & Dec, the second by Phillip Schofield and Holly Willoughby and the third by Christine Bleakley and Paddy McGuinness, all from The London Studios.

Show	Date	Timeslots	Presenters
Text Santa Starts Here! (launch show)	21-22 December 2012	18:55–19:00	Ant & Dec
Main show	21-22 December 2012	20:00–21:00	Ant & Dec
Main show	21-22 December 2012	21:00–22:00	Phillip Schofield; Holly Willoughby
Main show	21-22 December 2012	22:00–23:00	Paddy McGuinness; Christine Bleakley
Text Santa: One More Time (highlights show)	21-22 December 2012	00:00–01:15	Ant & Dec; Phillip Schofield; Holly Willoughby; Paddy McGuinness; Christine Bleakley

Within other shows

- A special edition of The Jeremy Kyle Show aired at 09:25 featuring people with many disabilities and talked about how the Text Santa charities helped them and their families get through their difficulties. Kyle treated these people with special trips and featured a guest appearance from Only Boys Aloud.
- A special edition of Dickinson's Real Deal from Ilford aired at 15:00 for Text Santa.
- A celebrity special of The Chase aired at 17:00 on 21 December for Text Santa, featuring Bradley Walsh as host with contestants Lorraine Kelly, Craig Charles, Jamelia and Dom Joly. Together, they raised £22,000 for the Text Santa charities.
- A special edition of Celebrity Juice aired on ITV1 & UTV at 23:15 and on STV at midnight on 22 December and was once again presented by Keith Lemon, Fearne Cotton and Holly Willoughby with panellists Davina McCall, Louis Smith, Aston Merrygold, Stacey Solomon and Simon Gregson.
- Laura Hamilton and Jeff Brazier presented a special 45-minute CITV programme at 16:00 on 21 December called Text Santa: CITV Special.

Events

- On 2 December 2012, around 8,500 people took part in a 'Santa Dash' in Liverpool, attempting a Guinness World Record for the largest Santa gathering whilst raising money for Text Santa, however, they didn't break the record of 13,200 santas.
- On 6 December 2012, the Biggest Bag Pack Ever took place in 200 Asda stores nationwide, celebrities including Eamonn Holmes and Ruth Langsford helped out in the Watford branch.
- eBay auctions took place to raise money for Text Santa, items sold included This Morning's sofa which sold for £1,200 and a tour of the Daybreak studios in London which sold for £510.

== 2013 appeal ==
The 2013 telethon aired live on 20 December 2013. The first hour of the telethon was hosted by Ant & Dec, the second by Phillip Schofield and Holly Willoughby, and the third and final hour by Christine Bleakley and Paddy McGuinness, all broadcast live from The London Studios.

Morrisons, Santander and Vodafone were Text Santa's official partners for the 2013 appeal.

An official charity single by the cast of The Big Reunion, performing a cover of "I Wish It Could Be Christmas Everyday" was released in December 2013 to raise money for Text Santa.

Show	Date	Timeslots	Presenters
Text Santa Starts Here! (launch show)	20-21 December 2013	18:55–19:00	Ant & Dec
Main show	20-21 December 2013	20:00–21:00	Ant & Dec
Main show	20-21 December 2013	21:00–22:00	Phillip Schofield; Holly Willoughby
Main show	20-21 December 2013	22:00–23:05	Paddy McGuinness; Christine Bleakley
Highlights show	20-21 December 2013	23:50–01:05	Ant & Dec; Phillip Schofield; Holly Willoughby; Paddy McGuinness; Christine Bleakley

Within other shows

- 15p from each vote on the entertainment show Stepping Out, went to the Text Santa charities.
- This Morning's 'Take a Moment' campaign raised £250,000 for the Text Santa appeal. The total was announced live on This Morning in December 2013 by Ruth Langsford, Andi Peters and Eamonn Holmes.
- On 20 December, there was a Text Santa 'takeover' on ITV, with some of the daytime programmes showing donation clips throughout the daytime schedule.
- A Text Santa special of The Jeremy Kyle Show aired at 09:25 on 20 December. It starred Jeremy Kyle who gave deserving children a once-in-a-lifetime opportunity to visit Lapland.
- A Text Santa special of Peter Andre's 60 Minute Makeover aired from Burgess Hill in West Sussex at 14:00 on 20 December, where the team performed a makeover of the lounge at The Cherry Tree Activity Centre, run by the Text Santa charity Age UK.
- A Text Santa special of Dickinson's Real Deal aired from Edgbaston in Birmingham at 15:00 on 20 December.
- A Text Santa special of Show Me the Telly aired at 16:00 on 20 December. The show, presented by Richard Bacon featured "legends" Chris Tarrant, Simon Gregson and Vanessa Feltz and television critics Boyd Hilton, Ian Hyland and Kevin O'Sullivan who won £3,000 for Text Santa.
- A celebrity special of The Chase aired at 17:00 on 20 December, featuring Bradley Walsh as host with celebrity contestants from the ITV News, Matt Barbet, Alastair Stewart, Romilly Weeks and Charlene White. Together, they raised £55,000 for the Text Santa appeal.
- Sooty, Sweep, Soo and Richard Cadell with guest stars Andy Akinwolere and Laura Hamilton appeared in a "Make it!" episode of the charity's five minute television appeal "Help with Hattitude" featured the cast of Sooty showing the public how to get involved. It was first shown on the CITV channel on Monday 25 November 2013.

Events

- On 5 December 2013, Text Santa broke the Guinness World Record for the largest number of pantomime horses in a race over 100 metres.
- eBay auctions took place to raise money for Text Santa, items sold included Phillip Schofield's face made of chocolate.

== 2014 appeal ==
In May 2014, it was announced that Text Santa would return for a fourth year in December 2014. The telethon aired live on 19 December 2014, a couple of weeks after the launch show, hosted by Phillip Schofield.

The presenting line-up changed slightly. With Holly Willoughby off on maternity leave, Alesha Dixon joined Paddy McGuinness for a segment of the show, while Phillip Schofield was reunited with his former Dancing on Ice co-host Christine Bleakley. Ant & Dec returned to the show as well.

On 19 December, the first part of Text Santa was hosted by Ant & Dec, the second by Phillip Schofield and Christine Bleakley, and the remainder of the show by Paddy McGuinness and Alesha Dixon. It was broadcast from The London Studios.

Show	Date	Timeslots	Presenters
Phillip's Live 24-Hour TV Marathon (launch show)	1 December 2014	11:00–23:59	Phillip Schofield
Phillip's Live 24-Hour TV Marathon (launch show)	2 December 2014	00:00–11:00	Phillip Schofield
Main show	19-20 December 2014	20:00–21:20	Michelle Visage; Ant & Dec
Main show	19-20 December 2014	21:20–22:15	Phillip Schofield; Christine Bleakley
Main show	19-20 December 2014	22:15–23:20	Paddy McGuinness; Alesha Dixon
Highlights show	19-20 December 2014	00:05–01:25	Ant & Dec; Phillip Schofield; Christine Bleakley; Paddy McGuinness; Alesha Dixon

Within other shows

- 15p from each vote on I'm a Celebrity...Get Me Out of Here!, went to the 2014 Text Santa charities.
- A Text Santa special of The Jeremy Kyle Show aired at 09:25 on 19 December. It saw Jeremy Kyle giving deserving children a once-in-a-lifetime opportunity to visit Lapland.
- A Text Santa special of Peter Andre's 60 Minute Makeover aired from Woodford Green in Essex at 14:00 on 19 December, where the team performed a makeover of the Buddy Hut at Haven House Children's Hospice, which is supported by Text Santa.
- On 18 November 2014, a Text Santa edition of Tipping Point was recorded. It featured Good Morning Britain presenters Charlotte Hawkins, Susanna Reid, Andi Peters and Richard Arnold, with normal host Ben Shephard as the host. It was aired on 19 December at 16:00. They raised a combined total of over £13,000 for the Text Santa charities.
- There was a Text Santa celebrity special of the game show The Cube, hosted by Phillip Schofield. It aired during the live telethon on 19 December and starred Paddy McGuinness and Alesha Dixon. They were the first ever people to take on The Cube together. Leigh Francis' alter ego Keith Lemon also made a guest appearance as 'The Body' as well as guests The Chuckle Brothers. They won £100,000 for the charities.
- Mel B and Warwick Davis guest starred in a Coronation Street sketch.
- There was a Birds of a Feather sketch for Text Santa starring regular cast including Lesley Joseph, Linda Robson and Pauline Quirke as well as a guest appearance from Paul O'Grady, playing Santa Claus.
- The Downton Abbey sketch for Text Santa guest starred George Clooney, Jeremy Piven and Joanna Lumley.

Events

- eBay auctions took place to raise money for Text Santa, items sold included tickets to The X Factor final at Wembley Arena and a set tour of Downton Abbey.

Phillip's Live 24-Hour TV Marathon

Phillip Schofield presented a live 24-hour long programme on ITV3 for Text Santa. It was broadcast on 1 December through to 2 December 2014 and recorded in Studio 3 at The London Studios.

Phillip's JustGiving page has raised £101,924 for the Text Santa charities.

He also abseiled the tower at The London Studios for Text Santa.

The 24-hour show was nominated for a 2015 Broadcast Digital Award in the category of "Best Sports or Live Event Coverage".

Running order

1 December 2014

- 11:00 – TV marathon begins, Phillip co-hosts This Morning with Amanda Holden.
- 12:30 – Phillip is a guest panellist on Loose Women alongside Ruth Langsford, Penny Lancaster and Jane Moore.
- 13:20 – Phillip travels to ITV News HQ with Chris Moyles, and chats to Mary Nightingale on the Mobile Phone.
- 13:30 – Phillip is given a tour of ITV News office by Mary Nightingale before being interviewed by Steve Scott on the ITV Lunchtime News.
- 14:10 – Phillip returns to Kent House to have a rehearsal for his national weather forecast with Lucy Verasamy.
- 14:25 – Phillip sees his Text Santa studio for the first time.
- 14:30 – Phillip discovers his next big challenge for Text Santa, where he has to abseil down the side of Kent House seeing Chris Moyles, Ruth Langsford, Gemma Collins, Lucy Verasamy, and the This Morning crew in the various offices.
- 15:30 – Phillip is joined by Penny Lancaster to meet some of the people who Text Santa help.
- 16:00 – Phillip is joined by his former Dancing on Ice co-host Christine Bleakley as well as dancers Vincent Simone and Flavia Cacace. There is also an exclusive look at the brand new CITV animation with footballer Frank Lampard.
- 17:11 – There is a special performance of Always Look On The Bright Side Of Life from Spamalot with Joe Pasquale and Todd Carty.
- 17:32 – Phillip looks at some fundraising ideas with Myleene Klass and Rav Wilding.
- 17:45 – Myleene Klass joined Phillip to look at some celebrity outfits the public could bid on to raise money for Text Santa.
- 18:00 – Phillip is joined by Peter Dickson as they take a train ride along London's South Bank, to the Christmas Market, meeting some of the X Factor finalists along the way as well as Xtra Factor presenter Sarah Jane Crawford, before helping turn the London Eye red, one of the Text Santa colours.
- 18:55 – Phillip's live national weather forecast for Text Santa, broadcast live from the Good Morning Britain studio and under guidance from Lucy Verasamy.
- 19:00 – Phillip is joined by Andi Peters who gives reactions to his Weather Forecast.
- 19:23 – Phillip is joined in the studio by Patti Clare to talk about the Coronation Street v Emmerdale Netball game and what Coronation Street has in store for Text Santa.
- 19:28 – Phillip does a live continuity announcement on ITV to Coronation Street.
- 19:30 – Phillip chats to Mark Labbett, who talks about the Text Santa Quiz night, then he speaks to Linda Robson who talks about one of the Text Santa charities Marie Curie.
- 19:40 – Michael Ball dropped by to talk to Phillip about his new album.
- 19:45 – Phillip does a live trail on ITV.
- 19:49 – Amanda Holden joined Phillip live in the studio in her Pyjamas, to brief him on the following day's This Morning.
- 20:00 – There was a world exclusive of George Clooney's cameo in Downton Abbey's Text Santa special.
- 20:03 – Phillip chats to ITV News Central's Sameena Ali-Khan at Villa Park who is hosting a Text Santa Curry Night.
- 20:07 – Phillip ordered the food for the I'm a Celebrity...Get Me Out of Here! curry night.
- 20:12 – Phillip went live to Ant and Dec in Australia ahead of the latest episode of I'm a Celebrity...Get Me Out of Here!, then former campmates Ashley Roberts, Christopher Biggins, Kerry Katona, Tony Blackburn, Amy Willerton, Janet Street-Porter and Joe Pasquale arrived to watch the latest episode of I'm a Celebrity...Get Me Out of Here!.
- 20:24 – Phillip spoke to Jason Wouhra from East End Foods as he delivered the curry for the I'm a Celebrity...Get Me Out of Here! curry night.
- 20:27 – Phillip does a continuity announcement for I'm a Celebrity...Get Me Out of Here! on ITV, before he re-joined the former campmates who shared their experiences in the jungle, while they watched the latest episode live, in their own edition of Gogglebox with a curry.
- 20:59 – During I'm a Celebrity...Get Me Out of Here!, Phillip took a Skype call from Holly Willoughby.
- 22:00 – After doing a Continuity announcement for the ITV News at Ten, Phillip chats to Laura Whitmore, Joe Swash, and Rob Beckett on I'm A Celebrity...Get Me Out Of Here Now before he does the Fish Eyes Challenge, and Phillip's hosts his own celebrity pub quiz with celebrities including Wayne Sleep, Chico Slimani, Ashleigh and Pudsey, Liz McClarnon, Heidi Range, Lydia Rose Bright, Ferne McCann, Rav Wilding, Lauren Goodger and Bobby-Cole Norris.
- 23:15 – Pixie Lott chats to Phillip.
- 23:34 – After Phillip made his last continuity announcement on ITV, Phillip's daughters, Ruby and Molly surprised him on Skype, then Pixie Lott gave a special performance.
- 23:41 – Magician and star of ITV2's Tricked, Ben Hanlin challenges Phillip to walk on glass.

2 December 2014

- 00:00 – Phillip is joined by Davina McCall who have a midnight feast on the roof of Kent house.
- 00:30 – Phillip is joined by the cast of Made in Chelsea who are giving the lifts in the Reception of ITV Towers a makeover.
- 00:40 – Phillip is joined by This Morning agony aunt Denise Robertson, as she answers the dilemmas of some familiar faces.
- 02:15 – Phillip is joined by the third series of The Great British Bake Off winner John Whaite to make some Hot chocolate.
- 02:28 – Ian Wallace, a dream expert joins Phillip to discuss people's dreams.
- 03:19 – Phillip talks to Olly Mann live on LBC, and then Jenni Falconer before her show on Heart.
- 04:00 – Ben Shephard arrives at ITV Towers to speak to Phillip and judge the ITV lifts makeover.
- 04:26 – Phillip talks to Eamonn Holmes as he gets ready to appear on Sunrise on Sky News.
- 05:00 – Phillip gets ready to appear on Good Morning Britain
- 06:00 – Phillip joined Susanna Reid, Ben Shephard and Charlotte Hawkins on Good Morning Britain.
- 07:30 – Phillip prepares to meet Prime Minister David Cameron
- 08:00 – Phillip interviewed David Cameron live from the Cabinet Room of 10 Downing Street.
- 08:41 – Phillip cooks breakfast for Lorraine Kelly and joins her on her show, Lorraine.
- 10:00 – Phillip starts his rehearsals for This Morning programme.
- 10:30 – Phillip goes live on This Morning, co-hosting with Amanda Holden.
- 11:00 – TV marathon ends on ITV's This Morning programme.

== 2015 appeal ==
Text Santa returned to ITV on 18 December 2015, with a new line-up with Stephen Mulhern, Amanda Holden, Caroline Flack and Olly Murs joining the presenting team.

Phillip Schofield, Christine Bleakley, Holly Willoughby, Alesha Dixon and Paddy McGuinness all returned this year. Ant & Dec didn't return to host Text Santa in 2015. The 2015 show was the last ever after Text Santa's cancellation in 2016.

Appeal videos were hosted by Ant & Dec, Bradley Walsh, Julie Walters, Martin Clunes and Myleene Klass.

Show	Date	Timeslots	Presenters
Pip Knit (launch show)	1 December 2015	06:00–22:30	Phillip Schofield
Main show	18 December 2015	20:00–20:30	Phillip Schofield; Holly Willoughby
Main show	18 December 2015	20:30–20:50	Caroline Flack; Olly Murs
Main show	18 December 2015	20:50–21:20	Paddy McGuinness; Alesha Dixon
Main show	18 December 2015	21:20–21:35	Amanda Holden
Main show	18 December 2015	21:35–21:50	Stephen Mulhern
Main show	18 December 2015	21:50–22:20	Christine Bleakley; Phillip Schofield
Main show	18 December 2015	22:20–22:40	Amanda Holden; Alesha Dixon
Main show	18 December 2015	22:40–22:55	Christine Bleakley; Phillip Schofield
Main show	18 December 2015	22:55–23:05	Paddy McGuinness; Alesha Dixon
Text Santa 2015 – The Best Bits (Highlights show)	18–19 December 2015	23:55–01:10	Paddy McGuinness; Alesha Dixon
Text Santa Update	25 December 2015	13:35–14:45	Holly Willoughby

Within other shows

- 15p from each vote on I'm a Celebrity...Get Me Out of Here!, went to the 2015 Text Santa charities.
- A Text Santa edition of The Jeremy Kyle Show aired at 09:25 on 18 December 2015.
- A Text Santa edition of Judge Rinder aired on 18 December 2015 at 14:00.
- A celebrity Text Santa edition of 1000 Heartbeats aired on 18 December 2015 at 15:00. Keith Lemon and Tess Daly took part in the episode and collectively won £7,500 for Text Santa.
- A celebrity Text Santa edition of Tipping Point aired on 18 December 2015 at 16:00 with Mark Foster, Tanni Grey-Thompson, Chris Kamara and Bobby George. Together, they raised a combined total of £4,850
- A Text Santa celebrity edition of The Chase was recorded in October 2015. The celebrities who took part were Robert Rinder, Brian McFadden, Denise Robertson and Andrea McLean. The chaser was Mark Labbett who beat the contestants. They still took away £6,000 for the Text Santa charities.
- Phillip Schofield appeared in Pip Knit on 1 December 2015. It saw him make guest appearances in every ITV show broadcast from 06:00 until 22:30.
- The Downton Abbey sketch for Text Santa guest starred Bruce Forsyth, Gordon Ramsay, Gok Wan, Brenda Blethyn, Jim Broadbent, Michelle Keegan and Warwick Davis and aired during the telethon on 18 December.
- A special edition of Benidorm for Text Santa starred Joan Collins and aired during the Update show on 25 December.
- A Coronation Street sketch aired during the live telethon on 18 December. The special edition guest starred Richard Branson.
- A celebrity edition of Ninja Warrior UK aired during the telethon on 18 December. The celebrities who took part were Ryan Thomas, Kimberly Wyatt, Mark Wright, Marvin Humes, Gemma Atkinson, Jayne Torvill, Christopher Dean, Philip Olivier, Louise Hazel, Ugo Monye and Carl Froch.
- A special Text Santa edition of Big Star's Little Star called Big Star's Bigger Star aired during the telethon and was presented by Stephen Mulhern. The celebrities who took part were Emma Willis, George Shelley and Jennie McAlpine.

Events

- The Knitted ad break was released on 18 December, prior to Christmas Jumper Day. In Partnership with British Gas, Nationwide, BT, Dreams, DFS and Amazon Prime.
- eBay auctions took place to raise money for Text Santa. Items for sale included a Ninja Warrior UK foam finger, signed by the presenters and a VIP Loose Women studio experience.
