= Norman Giller =

English writer

- Born: Norman Giller; 18 April 1940 (age 86); Stepney, London, England
- Occupations: Journalist, writer
- Notable credit(s): 120 books, television series, journalist
- Spouse: Eileen Giller (1936–2006) Joyce Giller (2024-)
- Children: 2
- Website: www.normangillerbooks.com

Norman Giller (born 18 April 1940, Stepney, East End, London) is an English author, a sports historian and television scriptwriter, who in October 2015 had his 100th book published. His 101st book, July 30, 1966 Football's Longest Day, was published in 2016 to coincide with the 50th anniversary of England's World Cup final victory at Wembley.

With 121 books to his name, Giller is a prolific author who began as a Fleet Street journalist. He was chief football reporter with the Daily Express in London (1966–74, succeeding Clive Toye), and has been a freelance writer since leaving Fleet Street in 1974. He spent 14 years as a member of the This Is Your Life scriptwriting team, and devised several television series including Who's the Greatest? (ITV, 1980s), The Games of 48 and Over the Moon, Brian, with Brian Moore and Brian Clough (ITV 1990s), Petrolheads (BBC2 2006); he co-produced 63 editions of Stand and Deliver (Sky TV, 1990s), and was scriptwriter and co-producer with Top Gear director Brian Klein of more than 50 sports-based videos/DVDs.

His 100th book, published in October 2015, is an autobiography called Headlines Deadlines All My Life.

His 93rd book, Sir Henry Cooper A Hero for All Time, was published in June 2012, and before that he self-published Tottenham, The Glory-Glory Game, which he wrote with members of the Spurs Writers' Club, which he formed in 2011.

Book No 94 followed in December 2012. It is called Bobby Moore The Master, and tells the story of the former England football captain's life on and off the pitch.No 95 was Keys to Paradise, an adult novel in harness with first-time American novelist, Jeni Robbins.

The 96th book by Giller is Bill Nicholson Revisited, based on conversations over a span of more than 40 years with former Spurs manager Nicholson It was published in 2013. Book No 97, published in 2014, is a biography of former Northern Ireland skipper and, later, journalist Danny Blanchflower.

Giller was the argument-settling Judge of The Sun for ten years, and he and his sports statistician son Michael set the 2,000 questions for the DVD version of Football Trivial Pursuit. With his then business partner Peter Lorenzo and associate Malcolm Rowley, Giller created one of the first major pub quiz competitions in 1974. It was called What's Yours? and had 64 competing pubs in a series sponsored by the Charrington's chain in south-east England.

His 81st book was a collaboration with Pelé and Gordon Banks and in partnership with their UK agent Terry Baker, a limited edition featuring an in-depth look at their careers and, in particular, the famous Banks save against Pelé for England against Brazil in the 1970 World Cup finals. Giller has a regular Fleet Street nostalgia blog at the Sports Journalists' Association website

Giller's 82nd book was The Lane of Dreams, a complete history of the Tottenham Hotspur ground at White Hart Lane before the bulldozers move in. The book is introduced by Jimmy Greaves and Steve Perryman. It is a self-published book by Giller, who experimented by having the second-half written on line by Tottenham supporters. He had six books published in 2010, written in collaboration with his sports statistician son, Michael Giller, and sports agent Terry Baker: Jimmy Greaves At Seventy and The Golden Double, the story of Tottenham's historic League and FA Cup triumph in 1960–61, Greavsie's Greatest (The 50 greatest post-war British strikers, selected by Jimmy Greaves), World Cup 2010, (a day to day diary of the tournament), Chopper's Chelsea, in collaboration with former Stamford Bridge captain Ron Harris, and Hammers-80, the story of West Ham United's FA Cup success of 1979–80, introduced by Trevor Brooking. His 88th book is a powerful novel about corruption in football, The Glory and the Greed', which has been produced ahead of traditional publication as an e-Book for reading on screen. Book No. 98, published in November 2014, was Spurs IQ, a part history, part quiz book about Tottenham Hotspur.

His 99th book, The Ali Files, was published in April 2015, and gives a fight-by-fight analysis of Muhammad Ali's ring career. His four books published in 2018/19 have been The Real Rocky, the Rocky Marciano story, Spurs '67, Billy Wright, My Dad with Vicky Wright, and Beyond the Krays, an eBook crime novel. During Lockdown, Giller completed a trilogy of crime novels featuring fictional Fleet Street journalist turned private investigator, JC Campbell, bringing his total of books published to 115.

Giller wrote an autobiographical football book called 'My 70 Years of Spurs', and he collaborated with his long-time friend Geoff Hurst on a book marking the 1966 World Cup hat-trick hero's 80th birthday, called Eighty At Eighty' This was published in the autumn of 2021. He delivered the eulogy for his life-long friend Jimmy Greaves and the official biography, The One and Only Jimmy Greaves, was his 119th book. He has since had published a biography of former England and Spurs centre-forward Bobby Smith (The Forgotten Hero).

== Biography ==
Giller was born in London's East End in the first year of the Second World War, and was evacuated with his mother and three brothers to a Devonshire farm. Educated at Raine's Foundation School in Stepney, he left at 15 to become a copyboy with the London Evening News. He started his reporting career with the Stratford Express in West Ham (1957), and arrived at the Daily Express after employment as a sports sub-editor with Boxing News, the London Evening Standard and the Daily Herald.

Giller has worked in PR and for ten years represented former boxing world champions Frank Bruno, John H Stracey, Jim Watt, Maurice Hope (all managed by his friend Terry Lawless), and (for his European fights) Muhammad Ali. He wrote newspaper and magazine columns in harness with Eric Morecambe for nine years, and also had collaborations with comedians Benny Hill and Tommy Cooper. Giller was commissioned to write six Carry On novels, sequels to the films.

He was married for 45 years to Eileen, who died in 2006. Giller has two children. When Eileen Giller died following renal failure, Giller raised more than £15,000 for the Dorset Kidney Fund in her memory. While queueing to pay their respects to Queen Elizabeth II, Norman declared his love for widow Joyce Lambert and they were married in 2024. They wrote a book about their experiences, Life Begins at 90.

== Bibliography ==
- Bobby Moore The Master
- Banks of England (with Gordon Banks)
- Pelé v Banks, The Save that Shook the World (with Terry Baker)
- "The Lane of Dreams" (with Jimmy Greaves and Steve Perryman)
- "Tottenham, The Managing Game"
- "Danny Blanchflower, This WAS His Life"
- "Bill Nicholson Revisited, The Master of White Hart Lane"
  - Spurs IQ, Tottenham Quiz and History book
- Spurs '67 The Spurs-Chelsea first Cockney Cup Final
- The Glory and the Grief (with George Graham)
- Football And All That (an irreverent history of the game)
- The Seventies Revisited (with Kevin Keegan)
- The Final Score (with Brian Moore)
- ABC of Soccer Sense (Tommy Docherty)
- Billy Wright, A Hero for All Seasons (official biography)
- Billy Wright, My Dad with Vicky Wright
- The Rat Race (with Tommy Docherty)
- Denis Compton (The Untold Stories)
- McFootball, the Scottish Heroes of the English Game
- Chopper's Chelsea (with Ron Harris and Terry Baker)
- Hammers-80 (with Terry Baker and introduced by Trevor Brooking)
- The Book of Rugby Lists (with Gareth Edwards)
- The Book of Tennis Lists (with John Newcombe)
- The Book of Golf Lists
- TV Quiz Trivia
- Sports Quiz Trivia
- Satzenbrau-sponsored Sports Puzzle Book
- Satzenbrau-sponsored TV Puzzle Book
- Know What I Mean (with Frank Bruno)
- Eye of the Tiger (with Frank Bruno)
- From Zero to Hero (with Frank Bruno)
- The Judge Book of Sports Answers
- Watt's My Name (with Jim Watt)
- My Most Memorable Fights (with Henry Cooper)
- How to Box (with Henry Cooper)
- Henry Cooper's 100 Greatest Boxers

Henry Cooper A Hero for All Time

- Rocky Marciano The REAL Rocky
- Mike Tyson Biography
- Mike Tyson, the Release of Power (Reg Gutteridge)
- Crown of Thorns, the World Heavyweight Championship (with Neil Duncanson)
- Fighting for Peace (Barry McGuigan biography, with Peter Batt)
- World's Greatest Cricket Matches
- World's Greatest Football Matches
- Golden Heroes (with Dennis Signy)
- The Judge (1,001 arguments settled)
- The Great Football IQ Quiz Book (The Judge of The Sun)
- The Marathon Kings
- The Golden Milers (with Roger Bannister)
- Olympic Heroes (with Brendan Foster)
- Olympics Handbook 1980
- Olympics Handbook 1984
- Book of Cricket Lists (Tom Graveney)
- Top Ten Cricket Book (Tom Graveney)
- Cricket Heroes (Eric Morecambe)
- Big Fight Quiz Book
- TVIQ Puzzle Book
- Lucky the Fox (with Barbara Wright)
- Gloria Hunniford's TV Challenge
- Footballing Fifties
- The concorde club – The First 50 Years (with Cole Mathieson)
- Jimmy Greaves at Seventy (with Terry Baker and Michael Giller)
- The Golden Double (with Terry Baker and Michael Giller)
- World Cup 2010 (with Michael Giller)
- Headlines Deadlines All My Life (autobiography)
- July 30, 1966 Football's Longest Day
- World Cup 70 Revisited
- "How to SELF Publish, Trust Me I'm An Author"
- My 70 Years of Spurs
- Sir Geoff Hurst, Eighty At EightyCo-author
- The One and Only Jimmy Greaves Authorised biography
- Bobby Smith, Forgotten Hero Biography

=== Comedy novelizations ===
- Carry On Doctor
- Carry On England
- Carry On Loving
- Carry On Up the Khyber
- Carry On Abroad
- Carry On Henry
- What A Carry On

=== Novels ===
- A Stolen Life (novel)
- Mike Baldwin: Mr Heartbreak (novel, introduced by Johnny Briggs)
- Uncle Rhymo, Tales of Nicely Spicely Land (children's novel)
- Duncan, the Talking Football (children's novel)
- The Glory and The Greed (novel)
- Keys to Paradise (novel)
- Beyond the Krays (crime novel)
- The Henley Murders (crime novel)
- The Fleet Street Murders (crime novel)
- The Football Murders (crime novel)

=== Books in collaboration with Ricky Tomlinson ===
- Football My Arse
- Celebrities My Arse
- Cheers My Arse
- Reading My Arse (The Search for the Rock Island Line)

=== Books in collaboration with Jimmy Greaves ===
- This One's on Me
- The Final (novel)
- The Ball Game (novel)
- The Boss (novel)
- The Second Half (novel)
- Let's Be Honest (with Reg Gutteridge)
- Greavsie's Heroes and Entertainers
- World Cup History
- GOALS! The greatest ever scored
- Stop the Game, I Want to Get On
- The Book of Football Lists
- Taking Sides
- Funny Old Games (with Ian St John)
- Sports Quiz Challenge
- Sports Quiz Challenge 2
- It's A Funny Old Life
- Saint & Greavsie's World Cup Special
- The Sixties Revisited
- Don't Shoot the Manager
- Greavsie's Greatest The 50 Greatest post-war British strikers

== Television ==
- This Is Your Life scriptwriter (1981–1995)

Including programmes featuring Richard Branson, Jimmy Savile, Frank Bruno, Paul Daniels, Simon Weston, Ruth Madoc, Dan Maskell, Cliff Morgan, Denis Compton, Billy Wright, Peter Shilton, John Surtees, Nigel Mansell, Peter Alliss, Henry Cotton, Terry Lawless, Joe Johnson, James Herbert, Jack 'Kid' Berg, Reg Gutteridge, Mike Reid, Stan Boardman, Benny Green, George Shearing, Helen Shapiro

- Who's the Greatest, devisor and scriptwriter of an ITV series that involved celebrities such as:

David Frost, Michael Parkinson, Jeffrey Archer, Tom Graveney, Gloria Hunniford, Eamonn Andrews, Tom O'Connor, Stan Boardman, Bernie Winters, Dennis Waterman, Willie Rushton and Henry Cooper.

- Stunt Challenge for ITV (in the 1980s, scriptwriter with Derek Thompson.
- Stand and Deliver for Sky TV (co-producer with Brian Klein of on the Box Productions)

63 comedy programmes featuring, among others, Mike Reid, Norman Collier, Frank Carson, Jim Bowen, Stan Boardman, Ted Rogers, Cannon and Ball and Bernard Manning.

- The Games of 48 (ITV 1998, devisor and scriptwriter with Brian Moore)

Guests included Olympic legends Emil Zátopek, Fanny Blankers-Koen and Bob Mathias

- Petrolheads (2006 for BBC2), devisor and scriptwriter

Regular panellists were Richard Hammond, Chris Barrie and presenter Neil Morrissey. Featured guests included Eamonn Holmes, Murray Walker, Ricky Tomlinson, Ronan Keating, James May, Philip Glenister.

- Over the Moon, Brian (ITV), devisor and scriptwriter

Tribute series to Brian Moore, with guests including Brian Clough and Jack Charlton
