= The Nightly Show =

The Nightly Show or Nightly Show may refer to:

- The Nightly Show with Larry Wilmore (2015–2016), an American late-night panel talk show
- The Nightly Show (2017), a British late-night panel talk show
