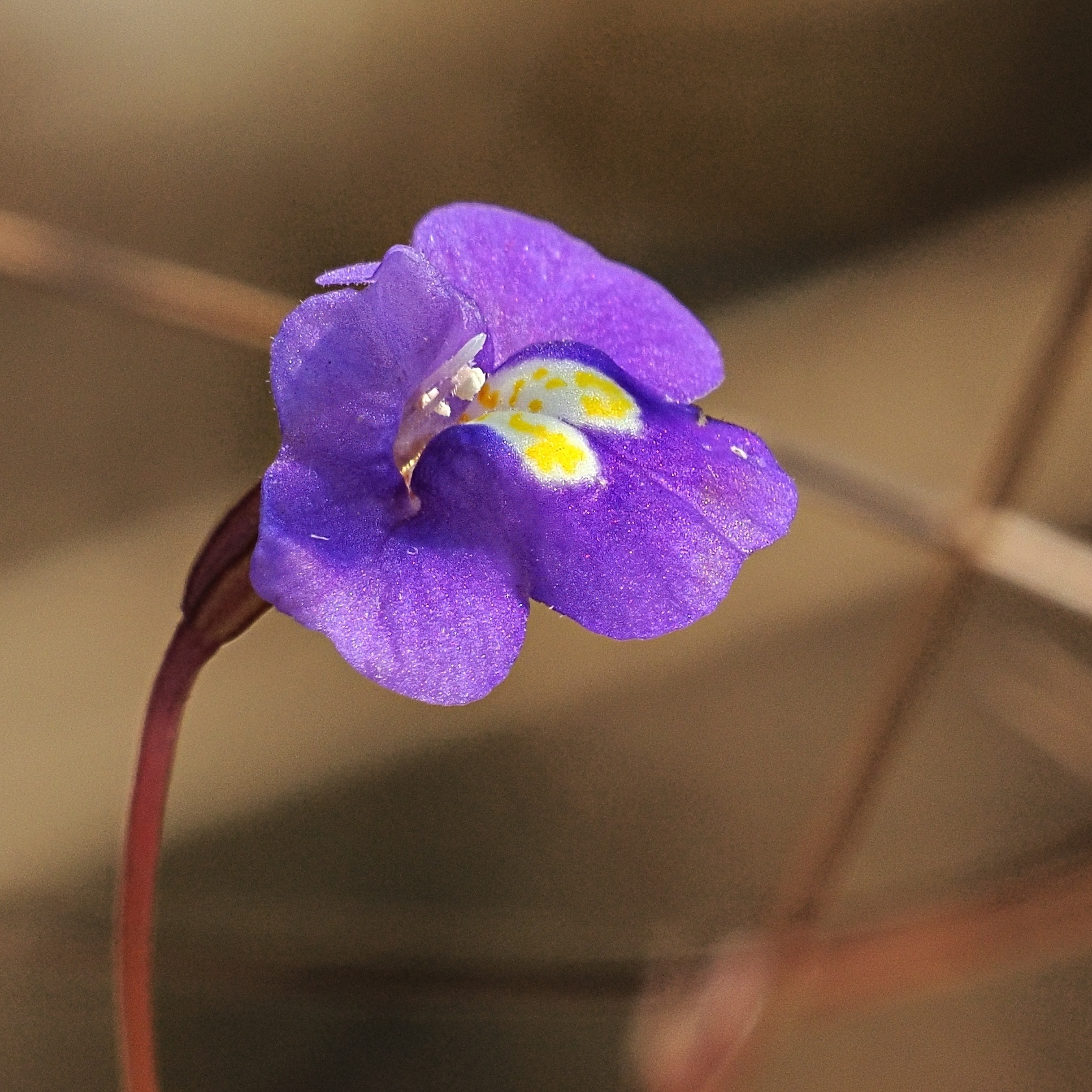

Scientific classification
- Kingdom: Plantae
- Clade: Tracheophytes
- Clade: Angiosperms
- Clade: Eudicots
- Clade: Asterids
- Order: Lamiales
- Family: Phrymaceae
- Genus: Uvedalia
- Species: U. linearis

Binomial name
- Uvedalia linearis R.Br.

Synonyms
- Mimulus uvedaliae Benth.

= Uvedalia linearis =

Species of plant in the lopseed family

Uvedalia linearis is a flowering plant in the family Phrymaceae, native to Australia, where it is found in Western Australia, the Northern Territory, and Queensland.

It was first described in 1810 by Robert Brown.
