= Oliver's Twist =

Television series

- Directed by: Brain Klein
- Presented by: Jamie Oliver
- Opening theme: "Just the Start" by Scarlet Division
- Ending theme: "Just the Start" (instrumental)
- Composer: Leigh Haggerwood
- Country of origin: United Kingdom
- Original language: English
- No. of series: 2
- No. of episodes: 52

Production
- Executive producer: Andrew Conrad (series 2)
- Producers: Simon Willis (series 1); Rowan Beacon (series 2)
- Production locations: London, England
- Running time: 30 minutes
- Production companies: Fresh One Productions; FremantleMedia North America

Original release
- Network: Food Network; BBC Two (repeats)
- Release: 14 May 2002 – 3 April 2004

Oliver's Twist is a 2002 television series featuring chef Jamie Oliver. The name of the program is a play on the title of Charles Dickens' novel Oliver Twist. Following the popularity of his first TV series, The Naked Chef, Oliver began producing Oliver's Twist to be aired outside the UK. The show became a success — being aired in over 70 countries — and helped establish Oliver's global popularity.

== Production ==
The show was produced by Oliver's own production company, Fresh One Productions, and 52 episodes were aired in total. All music for the show was composed by Leigh Haggerwood. "Just the Start", the theme song, was performed by Scarlet Division, the band for which Oliver has been a drummer for since 1989.

== Episodes ==
=== Series 1 (2002–03) ===
Ep. (by no. and name)	Original air date	Summary
1 Fish and Chips at home	14 May 2002	Andre, Franscesco, and Sarah are American university students. Oliver teaches them how to make traditional British foods like spotted dick and fish and chips.
2 Copper's Curries	21 May 2002	Oliver cooks some spicy dishes like mango lassi, cellophane noodle salad and monkfish wrapped in banana leaves for a police officer.
3 Scrumptious and Sinful	28 May 2002	Oliver cooks tagliatelle with saffron and seafood, carpaccio with baby beets, and lime and basil sorbet for some female models.
4 Great Packed Lunches	4 June 2002	Oliver cooks squashed cherry tomato salad, meatballs and calzone for two boys.
5 Kitchen Virgins	11 June 2002	Oliver cooks up hearty food for builders.
6 Singletons	18 June 2002	Oliver teaches single women how to cook to impress their potential boyfriends.
7 ABBA Mania	25 June 2002	Oliver cooks for a band that dresses like ABBA and sings their songs.
8 Late Night Snacks	2 July 2002	Oliver meets two stand-up comedians and introduces them to quick and easy food.
9 More than just a Lettuce Leaf	9 July 2002	Oliver cooks for his magician friend and his friends, all of whom are vegetarians and bored of simple non-meat meals.
10 Big Grub for Big Boys	16 July 2002	Oliver cooks a hearty meal including chicken cooked in milk for Wasps RFC players Mark Denney, Alex King, Fraser Waters and Lawrence Dallaglio.
11 Painting Party	2 October 2002	Oliver makes paella for his friends, including his former classmate and best friend Jimmy Doherty.
12 Tiger	8 October 2002	Oliver serves his granny, affectionately known as Tiger, and a group of her friends to afternoon tea.
13 First Date	15 October 2002	Oliver helps his sister-in-law Lisa impress her boyfriend by preparing a brilliant meal for her date.
14 Halloween	22 October 2002	Oliver cooks Halloween-themed food for children.
15 Suppliers Surprise	30 October 2002	Oliver treats some of his suppliers from Borough Market to a meat-centred dinner using ingredients he purchased from them.
16 Scarlet Division	5 November 2002	Oliver used to be the drummer in the band Scarlet Division since 1990. These days he's too busy working to get an opportunity to play with the gang. He has managed to get everyone together for a jamming session performing the theme song "Just the Start" and cooked for them.
17 The Bill	12 November 2002	Oliver meets actor Steven Hartley of the police drama The Bill. He invites Hartley's co-stars Trudie and George for a hot and spicy fest.
18 Bon Voyage	23 November 2002	Jamie Smith is travelling for a year so Oliver cooks a farewell meal for him.
19 Christmas	3 December 2002	Oliver cooks a Christmas meal for his office production staff.
20 Wedding	18 January 2003	Oliver prepares the food for his friend Paula's wedding.
21 Football Breakfast	21 January 2003	Oliver cooks breakfast for his mates including Jimmy after a night out clubbing before they watch the World Cup match between France and England.
22 Wild City	25 January 2003	Oliver meets his mentor Gennaro and they travel around London to forage for ingredients for a lunch.
23 Wimbledon	30 January 2003	Oliver's wife and mother-in-law come over to watch a Wimbledon final and Oliver cooks a summer-themed meal for them.
24 Friends United	5 February 2003	Oliver organises a reunion with some school friends.
25 Chocolate	12 February 2003	As Oliver and his wife head out for a meal, he prepared chocolate-centred food for the babysitters.
26 Bollywood	19 February 2003	Oliver's friend Poppy is a Bollywood choreographer and dancer. He cooks up an Indian meal for her and other dancers and learns Bollywood dancing from them.

=== Series 2 (2003–04) ===
Ep. (by no. and name)	Original air date	Summary
1 Flash in the Pan	14 May 2003	Oliver again meets up with his best friend Jimmy Doherty who is a field scientist. They meet at Borough Market and cook a frittata using Doherty's camping stove. They then return to Oliver's flat where Oliver shows Doherty how to cook easy dishes which can be cooked in with Doherty's portable stove: chicken with asparagus, cherry tomatoes, pancetta and olives, and fish steamed with couscous.
2 An Englishman and An Irishman	21 May 2003	Oliver meets Irish chef Richard Corrigan and they exchange recipes — Corrigan cooks pork chops with sage, honey, cider vinegar and apricots while Oliver cooks up champ.
3 Jamie and the King	28 May 2003	Oliver has meets his friend John Prescott, who is a professional Elvis impersonator, and cooks food that Elvis used to eat.
4 Veg Out	4 June 2003	Oliver shops at Borough Market and cooks roast chicken, roasted potatoes, squash and parsnips with carrots and stir-fried cabbage.
5 A Very British BBQ	11 June 2003	Oliver plans a BBQ for Australian chef Tobie Puttock and his restaurant sommelier Matt Skinner, both of whom work at his restaurant Fifteen. However, the BBQ is indoors since it is raining.
6 My New Kitchen	18 June 2003	Oliver has a new kitchen but the gas stove doesn't seem to work. He calls his friend Andy who repairs it and Oliver shows Andy some dishes that he has never tried before: red mullet with lime; smoked salmon with carpaccio and raw beetroot, and a tarragon salad.
7 Jamie's Soup Kitchen	25 June 2003	Oliver then owns a restaurant named Fifteen, training young people to be cooks. He invites two of them over to his flat to let them try Italian pappa al pomodoro, Spanish fisherman soup and an Asian chicken broth.
8 Carnival Brazil	9 July 2003	Oliver's chief pot washer is a Brazilian. They pair up and the Brazilian teaches Oliver how to make feijoada, a very famous Brazilian pork-based stew. Oliver in return attempts to make Bolinho de Balcahau (fish cakes). The final item is caipirinhas and the pot washer's dance and music troupe are invited over.
9 Pasta and the Master	16 July 2003	Oliver once again meets up with Gennaro Contaldo and the former makes fresh pasta for Oliver. They meet up at Oliver's flat and Oliver makes a different version of spaghetti bolognaise and then linguini with red mullet.
10 World on a Plate	23 July 2003	Oliver meets up with Peter Gordon, a Kiwi chef who cooks fusion food at his restaurant. They head to Oliver's flat and Gordon shows Oliver curry leaf crusted snapper with smoked coconut and tamarind broth garnished with lotus root. In return, Oliver makes salt and pepper squid with plum and mango chutney.
11 The Boat Trip	8 October 2003	Oliver's friend Brian Klein, is heading for a boat trip. Oliver prepares a farewell meal consisting of a lobster club sandwich, mayonnaise, strawberry champagne cocktail and Eton Mess.
12 Birthday boy	15 October 2003	It's Oliver's 28th birthday and he returns home to Essex. He first makes a lamb dish in his family's pub kitchen. Next, he picks herbs at his mother's garden, heads to where builders are constructing his new family home and makes potato salad and trout and halibut roasted on a spit.
13 The Night Shift	22 October 2003	Oliver heads to his restaurant Fifteen late at night and works with the baker to conjure up several baked dishes. These include basic bread dough, rosemary and grape calzone, roasted vegetable bread and a pizza with breakfast items as toppings.
14 Jamie and the Soccer Girls	5 November 2003	Oliver suddenly finds out his neighbour is the captain of a ladies football club. While the team play against another female team, Oliver makes tapas for the girls. Dishes include marinated olives and peppers, courgette salad, mashed chickpeas with paprika, orange and onion salad and a Spanish drink.
15 Daddy's Girl	12 November 2003	Oliver is left at home with his young daughter Poppy as his wife heads away during the weekend. Father and daughter bond together over fruit lollipops, Moroccan stew and spring minestrone soup.
16 Health Kick	8 January 2004	Oliver visits a certain Jane Clarke who advises him on healthy eating. With new ideas, Oliver cooks a health-conscious lunch including tangerines with vanilla, almonds and chocolate, steamed sea bass with spring vegetables, fruit juice and crab and grapefruit salad.
17 New Kids on the Block	14 January 2003	Oliver has another group of students at his restaurant, Fifteen. He invites some over and cooks up a fillet of beef with wild mushrooms, wrapped in prosciutto, potatoes and fennel, and lemon tart.
18 Late Night Munchies	21 January 2004	Oliver finishes a shift at Fifteen and invites some of the chefs back to his place. He makes a Philly steak sandwich and popcorn, while Toby, one of the chefs, introduces everyone to hot chocolate with chilli.
19 George's Day Off	28 January 2004	Oliver's favorite fishmonger in London is George Ngyutin, who is Mauritian. Oliver urges Ngyutin to take a day off and cooks for him and his extended family tropical fruit salad, seafood and rice soup and cod baked in banana leaves.
20 Chocoholic	11 February 2004	Oliver has to write a column in a magazine about chocolate and in search of inspiration, he visits The Chocolate Society. He then cooks up chocolate risotto, pan-seared venison with chocolate and a chocolate aubergine dessert.
21 East Meets West	18 February 2004	Oliver met two girls on a trip to Japan and these girls arrive in London. He cooks up gyozas with a dipping sauce, saketini cocktails, shabu-shabu, and invites them to his flat.
22 The Big Cheese	25 February 2004	Oliver visits his friend, Patricia Michelson, in her cheese shop La Fromagerie to learn more about cheeses. After buying some of Michelson's cheeses, he returns and prepares baked goat's cheese, baked sweet potatoes with cheese and a cheese and pickle roll.
23 Jekka the Herb Lady	4 March 2004	Oliver visits Jekka McVicar who grows herbs for sale. Returning home with some of McVicar's herbs, he cooks up lemon verbena granita with apple compote, rib-eye steak with sautéed potatoes and summer savory and garlic butter and a rustic bread salad. The episode ends with McVicar coming over to try these dishes.
24 The Session	20 March 2004	Oliver has finished practicing with his band Scarlet Division. He agrees to cook for them if they pack up his drum set. Oliver first visits Chef Das Sreedharan who provides him with varieties of poppadums. He then returns to his flat and makes a dipping sauce for those poppadums, a pineapple curry and a unique onion bhaji.
25 Peter's Party	24 March 2004	Oliver's friend, Peter Bragg is celebrating his birthday and the former has agreed to cook food for his birthday party. Oliver makes cocktail-type food including pesto with pasta, beans and potatoes, watermelon salad, chicken kebabs and smoked salmon bagels.
26 Picnic in the Park	3 April 2004	In this season finale, Oliver prepares chicken baked in pastry crust, green salad with basil dress, piccalli and an elderflower drink. All this food is for a picnic.
