= ITV Telethon =

Charity telethons organised by the ITV network

- Logo for the 1990 event.
- Also known as: Thames Telethon
- Presented by: Michael Aspel
- Country of origin: United Kingdom
- Original language: English
- No. of episodes: 5 telethons

Production
- Running time: 10 hours (1980); 24 hours (1985); 27 hours (1988 &1990); 28 hours (1992)
- Production company: ITV Studios

Original release
- Network: Thames Television (1980, 1985); ITV Network (1988, 1990, 1992)
- Release: 2 October 1980 – 19 July 1992

Related
- Text Santa; From the Heart; STV Children's Appeal

The ITV Telethons were three charity telethons organised and televised in the United Kingdom by the ITV network. They took place in 1988, 1990 and 1992. Each lasted for 27 hours (28 in 1992) and all were hosted by Michael Aspel.

== Thames Telethon (1980 and 1985) ==
The ITV Telethon originated from the 10-hour Thames Telethon, which ran in the Thames/London ITV region only, on 2 October 1980 and raised more than £1 million, one month before the BBC's Children in Need appeal the same year

Thames broadcast another Telethon on 29–30 October 1985, which raised more than £2.5 million

== ITV Telethon (1988–1992) ==
Thames Telethon was considered such a success that a 27-hour marathon was broadcast across the entire network (in which all regular programming was suspended) over 29 and 30 May 1988 (a Sunday and Bank Holiday Monday), involving participation and input from all of the regional broadcasters around the country. It had the aim of raising money for disability charities across the United Kingdom.

Telethon helped thousands of charities in the UK. Many local ITV companies like Tyne Tees Television and Television South West contributed from company profits. In the TVS region alone, TVS donated £1 million from its own charity, the TVS Trust in late May 1990. Like the telethons in the US, the ITV Telethons also offered regional cut-ins by ITV companies all over the country, featuring personalities and local celebrities from that region such as Richard Whiteley for Yorkshire Television, Bob Warman for Central, Fred Dinenage for TVS or Ruth Madoc for HTV Wales.

One regional cut-in for the 1992 Telethon took place in the grounds outside Granada TV's Quay Street studio, and a non-stop 27-hour live stage presentation 'The Blackpool Roadshow' was gifted and coordinated by brother and sister Shirley Pearson and Johnnie Doolan. Amongst the many stage appearances was reportedly the first ever live set from the later famous band Oasis with guest appearances from chart topping artists, and choreographed sets from Blackpool show Mystique.

- 1988: Held across Sunday 29 May and Monday 30 May 1988, and raised £20 million on the night, and more than £23 million overall.
- 1990: Held across Sunday 27 May and Monday 28 May 1990, and raised £24,127,917 on the night.
- 1992: Held across Saturday 18 July and Sunday 19 July 1992 and raised £15,012,989.

=== Protests and closure ===
The 1990 and 1992 ITV Telethons were subject to protests organised by Block Telethon, an informal protest group of disabled people that believed that the telethons reinforced negative stereotypes of disabled people. The 1990 protest was modestly attended, whereas the 1992 protest with more than 1000 disabled people outside the LWT studios on the South Bank was credited with ending the Telethon series, and indirectly leading to developments such as Comic Relief, though in reality this had begun earlier, following the Live Aid concerts for a similar cause in 1985. This protest group Block Telethon formally became the Disabled People's Direct Action Network in 1993, which campaigned with other organisations against discrimination and for civil rights, leading up to the Disability Discrimination Act 1995.

After the 1992 Telethon raised a considerably smaller total compared to its two predecessors, it was branded a "flop" by the contemporary media. As well as the Block Telethon campaign, some of the blame was directed at the decision to hold the event in mid summer, compared to the 1988 and 1990 Telethons which were held in late spring. Another factor was the ongoing recession of the period; with the BBC's Children in Need appeal of the same year also experiencing a significant downturn in donations compared to previous years.

In June 1993 ITV decided to scrap the 1994 Telethon saying "viewers have grown tired of being asked to donate money to Television charity Appeals" and the "telethon format is tired and people no longer respond well to things that are old".
