= Leigh Haggerwood =

- Born: England
- Occupations: Singer, songwriter, record producer, musician
- Instruments: Vocals, keyboards, piano
- Website: www.ukcomposer.com, www.florinstreet.com

Leigh Haggerwood is a contemporary composer based in London, UK. He specializes in songwriting, keyboards, singing, music production, audio engineering and sound-to-picture scoring. His credits include music for numerous TV shows and commercials which are broadcast around the world.

Along with chef Jamie Oliver, Leigh Haggerwood was a founding member of the band Scarlet Division, which released the single, "Sundial", in October 2000 through Sony Music.

Haggerwood also wrote several songs for Jamie Oliver's live shows which included the YouTube hit "Lamb Curry – Give It to Me Hot", "The Kiss of Summer and "Fish Stew". His TV credits include the ITV Text Santa Theme and incidental musical, Oliver's Twist (Just the Start, the theme song), Trinny and Susannah, Jamie's School Dinners, Petrolheads on BBC Two and TV Land's High School Reunion.

== The Florin Street Band ==
Haggerwood is best known for his Victorian-themed creation The Florin Street Band which he put together to record an original Christmas song he had written called "My Favourite Time of Year". Disappointed by the demise of Christmas song writing in the UK, Leigh set out to create a traditional-sounding song with epic production values and strong melodies. His idea included a music video set in 19th century England with snow-lined streets, lanterns, period costumes and snow-dusted rooftops. UK record companies would not fund such an ambitious idea as they did not consider it financially viable. So Leigh eventually decided to make it happen himself by employing session musicians to record the song and funding the music video with his life savings.

He produced the record at Trevor Horn's Sarm Studios and requested the services of 36 session musicians including The English Chamber Choir. The majority of Leigh's work is sung and performed by other artists, but Leigh decided to sing "My Favourite Time of Year" himself so that he could maintain the Victorian theme and make sure it would end up as he intended.

The period music video was the biggest challenge of the project, but after a long search, Leigh found talented British director, Nick Bartleet, who shared his vision and helped make it a reality. As the plans progressed, American cinematographer John Perez offered his services as Director of Photography, and the extraordinary video was shot at Blists Hill Victorian Town at Ironbridge in Shropshire. The song and video received a public response through social networking websites with many people describing it as a future classic. The song and video have won the UK Songwriting Contest.

Text Santa

Text Santa is a charity initiative first broadcast on UK television network, ITV, in 2011. The project aims to raise money and awareness for a number of charities during the festive season and is heavily promoted by ITV in the form of TV shows, radio and sponsorship by major brands. The producers were keen to use "My Favourite Time of Year" as the theme music to the appeal, which Leigh agreed to. With his experience as a media composer, he re-versioned the song and created other original music for the shows.

Winter Wonder

Since releasing "My Favourite Time of Year" in 2010, Leigh Haggerwood has created a Florin Street Christmas musical. In 2013 he decided to make another Victorian music video for one of the new songs entitled "Winter Wonder", which is about a celebration that the towns-folk put on as Winter draws in. The music video featured 100 cast members including dancers and local children from the village of Englishcombe in Bath, UK where it was filmed at the 14th century Tithe barn. "Winter Wonder" with lyrics and music by Leigh Haggerwood, was released on 16 December 2013, and went on to win the UK Songwriting Contest in 2014.

Light Our Way

Taken from the Florin Street Musical, "Light Our Way" is a love ballad between lead characters Travis and Bridie. It centers around a chant-like melody, with soft orchestration, choral backing and climactic orchestration. The song was featured on The Florin Street Band's 2015 DVD release.
