= Dermot O'Leary =

Irish television presenter (born 1973)

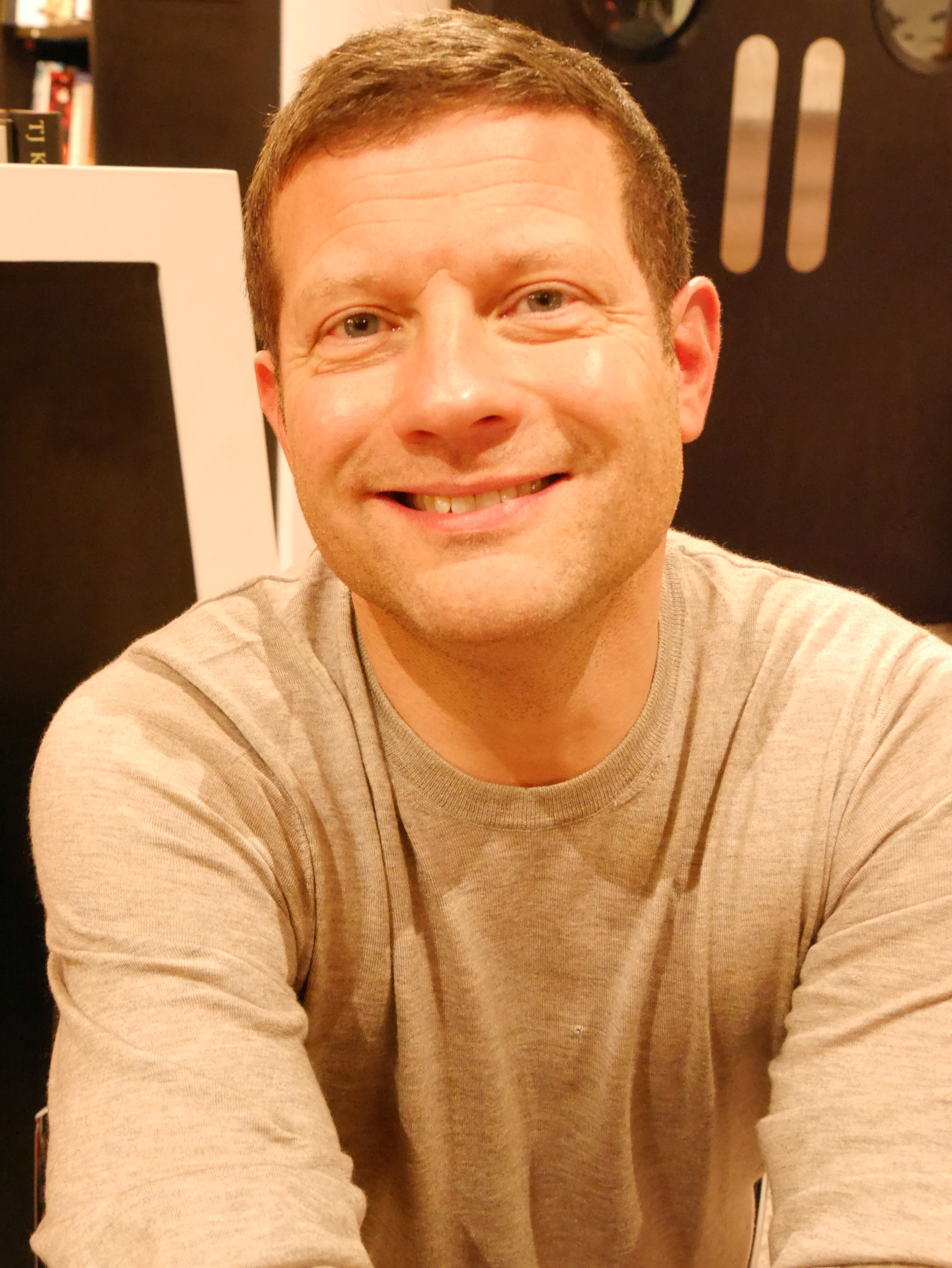
- O'Leary at Waterstones, London in 2024
- Born: Seán Dermot Fintan O'Leary; 24 May 1973 (age 53); Colchester, Essex, England
- Citizenship: Ireland, United Kingdom
- Occupation: Broadcaster
- Years active: 1998–present
- Employers: ITV (2007–present); BBC (2004–present); Channel 4 (2001–2008, 2014); XFM (2001–2004)
- Spouse: Dee Koppang (m. 2012)
- Children: 1

Seán Dermot Fintan O'Leary (born 24 May 1973) is an Irish broadcaster. He currently co-presents ITV's This Morning on Fridays, school holidays and bank holidays alongside Alison Hammond. He presented the talent show competition The X Factor on ITV from 2007 until its final series in 2018, with the exception of 2015.

O'Leary began his radio career working as a disc jockey at Essex Radio. From 2001 to 2003, he was a presenter for London's indie rock station XFM. O'Leary joined BBC Radio 2 in 2004 and currently presents the Saturday morning breakfast show and since April 2022 Alternative Sounds of the 90s.

== Early life ==
Seán Dermot O'Leary was born on 24 May 1973 in Colchester, Essex, the son of Irish parents Maria and Seán, both from County Wexford. He has an older sister, Nicola. He spent many of his childhood summers in County Wexford and has always had an Irish passport. He grew up in Marks Tey, Essex, where he attended primary school, and later joined St Benedict's Catholic College in Colchester. His complacent attitude at school caused him to fail all but two of his GCSEs. Following that, O'Leary re-took his school-leaving qualifications. This allowed him to later start his A-Level courses at Colchester Sixth Form College. He eventually studied for a degree in Media Studies with Politics at Middlesex University.

Growing up, he was a member of The Boys' Brigade Christian youth organisation. When he was in his late teens, he played American football for the Colchester Gladiators and the Ipswich Cardinals, where he wore the number 32.

== Career ==
=== Early career ===
O'Leary started as a disc jockey at BBC Essex, before becoming a runner on the TV show Light Lunch with Mel Giedroyc and Sue Perkins, and then a presenter at Channel 4 as part of the original presenting line-up of the channel's T4 strand. He moved on to present Big Brother's Little Brother (the companion show to Big Brother) on E4 from 2001 onwards. Also in 2001, O'Leary appeared on Lily Savage's Blankety Blank. In 2004, O'Leary hosted the reality television series Shattered.

=== ITV ===
On 29 March 2007, it was announced that O'Leary would replace Kate Thornton as the new host of ITV's The X Factor for at least two series. On 27 March 2015, O'Leary confirmed that he had quit The X Factor after eight years to pursue other projects. Via his Twitter account, he said:

Good afternoon. After eight wonderful years on The X Factor it's time for me to move on. I'd like to thank ITV, Simon, The X Factor family and particularly the viewers, all of whom have been a big part of my life for so long. I'd like to wish the team all the best for the future, especially whoever takes over from me.

O'Leary was replaced by Olly Murs and Caroline Flack, who previously co-hosted The Xtra Factor, the behind-the-scenes companion programme, together in 2011 and 2012.

On 29 March 2016, O'Leary returned to The X Factor as a presenter, replacing Murs and Flack, for the show's 13th series. In a statement, he said:

"I'm very flattered to be asked back to The X Factor, and am currently dusting off my dancing shoes. There is nothing more exciting than hosting live TV on a Saturday night. The show is naturally very close to my heart, after having hosted it for 8 years. I’m really looking forward to it, and excited to be back."

From 2010 to 2019, O'Leary presented the National Television Awards for ITV. Since 2010, O'Leary has hosted Soccer Aid on ITV, a celebrity football match in aid of the charity Unicef. In 2011, O'Leary hosted the Saturday night entertainment show The Marriage Ref on ITV. In September 2013, O'Leary hosted BRITs Icon: Elton John, a one-off music celebration for ITV.

In 2013, O'Leary presented the ITV campaign From the Heart, which encouraged viewers to consider organ donation. In January 2014, O'Leary filled in for Phillip Schofield for a week when he guest presented This Morning opposite Holly Willoughby.

In 2017, O'Leary co-presented the 37th BRIT Awards with Emma Willis. In March 2017, O'Leary guest-presented nine episodes of The Nightly Show on ITV.

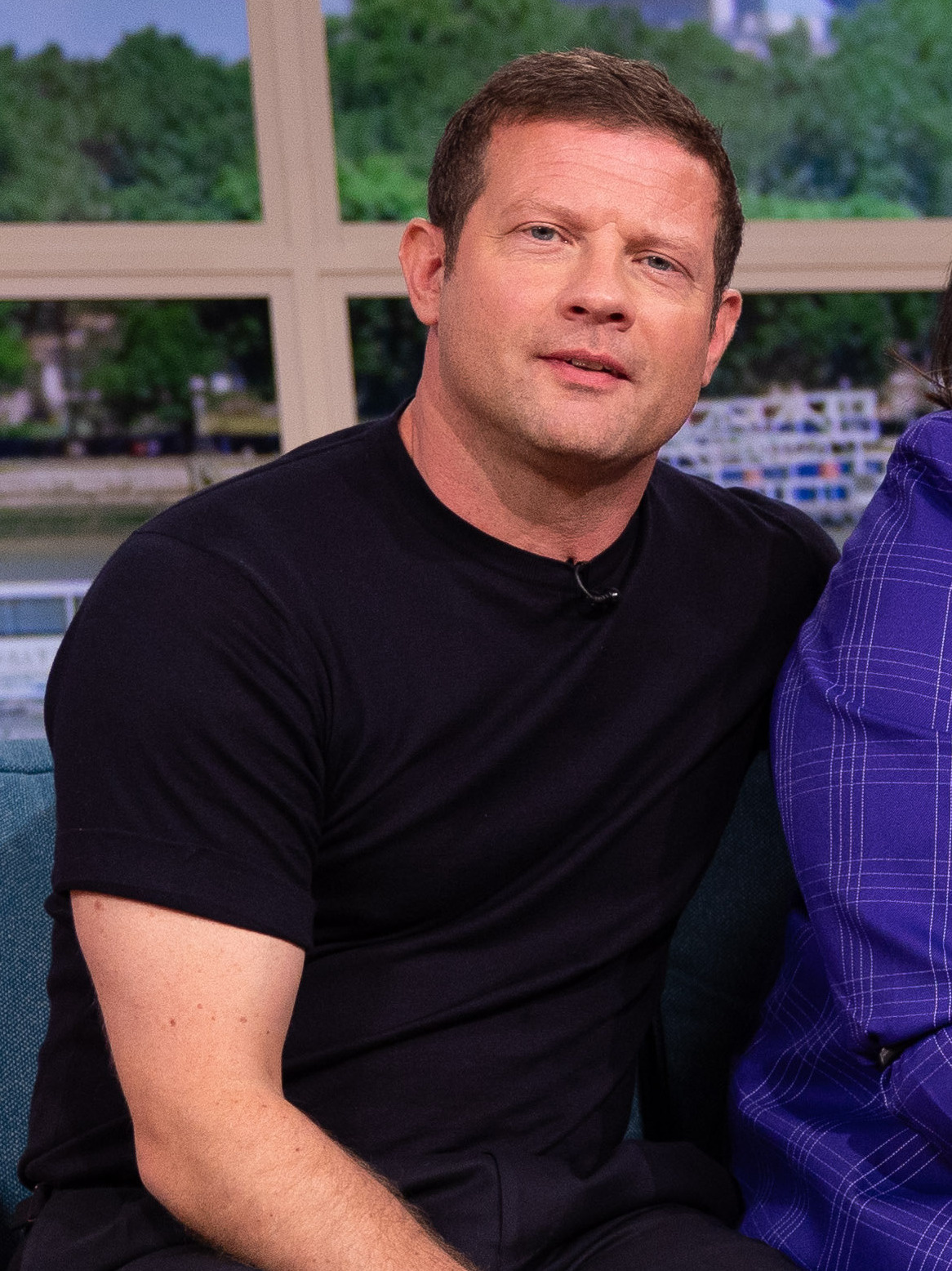
O'Leary in 2023

In November 2020, it was announced that Eamonn Holmes and Ruth Langsford had been dropped from their Friday slot on This Morning after 14 years. Alison Hammond and O'Leary were announced to take over the slot later that month. They presented their first show in January 2021.

=== Channel 4 ===
On 27 November 2007, it was announced that Big Brother: Celebrity Hijack was to be O'Leary's last series of Big Brother. After seven years, he made his final Big Brother appearance on 28 January 2008.

In 2009, O'Leary presented an episode of The Paul O'Grady Show, standing in for Paul O'Grady.

In March 2014, O'Leary made a return to Channel 4, where he presented the Live From Space season for three consecutive nights.

=== BBC ===
O'Leary was a presenter for Comic Relief in 2005, 2011 and 2013. He also presented Sport Relief in 2012. In August 2006, O'Leary signed a deal to present the game show 1 vs. 100, which aired on Saturday nights on BBC One in combination with The National Lottery Draws.

In May 2009, O'Leary became the presenter of Matt Lucas and David Walliams's show Rock Profile on BBC.

In March 2010, O'Leary hosted a spin-off edition of the BBC One show Question Time aimed at first time voters, which aired on BBC Three. He also presented Dermot Meets..., a series which saw him interview the likes of David Cameron, Gordon Brown, and Nick Clegg.

In November 2015, O'Leary replaced Terry Wogan on Children in Need due to Wogan's ill health.

In 2016, O'Leary presented the BBC One Saturday night game show The Getaway Car. The series was filmed in November 2015 and began airing in January 2016. He has also guest-presented two episodes of The One Show with Alex Jones.

=== Radio ===
O'Leary joined London's indie rock station XFM in 2001, firstly presenting weekday mid-mornings from 10 am to 1 pm, before moving to a Saturday evening show in mid-2002, where he remained until late 2003.

O'Leary joined BBC Radio 2 in September 2004, presenting a Saturday afternoon show titled Dermot's Saturday Club, which ran from 2 pm to 4 pm. Following a number of changes to the length and timing of O'Leary's programme, due in part to the arrival of Chris Evans to Radio 2 and his role as presenter of The X Factor, his show was broadcast between 3 pm and 6 pm from April 2009 until its end on 21 January 2017. It focused on new music and had featured live sessions. O'Leary also hosted Radio 2's coverage of the BRIT Awards and South by Southwest. He won Sony Gold Awards for Music Programme of the Year in 2008, 2010, and 2013.

Since March 2017, O'Leary has presented the Saturday morning breakfast show on BBC Radio 2 between 8 am and 10 am, taking over the slot from Brian Matthew and Sounds of the 60s, which moved to an earlier time of 6am with Tony Blackburn as presenter. Since April 2022 he has presented the weekly show Alternative Sounds of the 90s with Dermot O'Leary.

=== Other work ===
In March 2009, O'Leary introduced Michael Jackson to an audience of fans at The O2 in what turned out to be Jackson's final public appearance before his death.

In 2015, he was named one of GQ's 50 Best Dressed Men in Britain.

He has voiced television advertisements for Amazon Prime. In 2017, he released a children's book called Toto the Ninja Cat and the Great Snake Escape. In 2024, he released another children's book called Wings of Glory.

== Charity work ==
O'Leary opened The Rodillian Academy in 2001. He is one of nine presidents of Better Planet Education and is a patron of the international children's film festival CineMagic, a registered charity for young people based in Belfast. He has campaigned on behalf of Make Poverty History, and visited Sierra Leone with CAFOD accompanied by his father. He is also a patron of the male cancer awareness campaign Everyman. In 2003, he played in a charity match for the Colchester Gladiators as a punt returner, helping to raise £2,500 for the Barnardo's children's fund.

In 2005, O'Leary ran the London Marathon for the third time, completing it for his first time under four hours.

In March 2014, along with Jeremy Kyle, Bill Bailey, John Prescott, Richard Osman, Rizzle Kicks, Louis Smith, Levi Roots, and Ricky Wilson, O'Leary went commando for charity to raise awareness of testicular cancer. The promo was released on 24 February 2014.

For Red Nose Day 2015, O'Leary participated in a 24-hour dance to raise money for Comic Relief.

== Personal life ==
O'Leary married his long-term girlfriend, film producer Dee Koppang, at St Mary the Virgin Church in Chiddingstone, Kent, on 14 September 2012. They have one son, Kasper, who was born in June 2020. The family resides in Hampstead, North London.

In a 2003 interview, O'Leary praised the Socialist Workers Party but quipped that they would "take all of [his] money", so he instead supported the Labour Party. He supports Arsenal F.C., Celtic F.C. London Irish RFC and the Miami Dolphins. He can be heard on the Footballistically Arsenal podcast with his friends and fellow Arsenal fans Dan Baldwin and Boyd Hilton; on the show, it was mentioned that he owns shares in the club. He supports Wexford GAA in Gaelic games. During a studio guest appearance on Fantasy Football Euro 2004, he spoke of his support for the Republic of Ireland national football team and the national rugby union team.

In 2007, O'Leary was an usher at the wedding of Holly Willoughby. He is a practising Roman Catholic. In an interview with Peter Stanford of the Daily Telegraph in February 2008, he "cheerfully" admitted using contraception while living with his future wife: "I do get it in the neck from some Catholics who say I am a buffet Catholic, picking and choosing the bits I like or don't like."

O'Leary co-owned the Fishy Fishy restaurants in Brighton and Poole. The Poole restaurant closed in 2013, and the Brighton restaurant closed in 2016.

== Television ==
Year	Title	Role	Notes
1998–2001	T4	Presenter	
1999	The Dog's Balearics	Presenter	
2000	The Barfly Sessions	Presenter	
2000, 2008, 2009	Never Mind the Buzzcocks	Guest Team Captain / Guest Presenter	3 episodes
2001–2008	Big Brother's Little Brother	Presenter	
2002	Top of the Pops	Presenter	2 episodes
2002–2003	Re:covered	Presenter	
2002–2004	SAS: Are You Tough Enough?	Presenter	3 series
2003	Teen Big Brother: The Experiment	Presenter	
2004	Shattered	Presenter	7 episodes
2005, 2011–2013	Comic Relief	Co-presenter	Annually; 3 episodes
2006	Morning Glory	Presenter	
2006–2007	1 vs. 100	Presenter	2 series
2007–2014, 2016–2018	The X Factor	Presenter	11 series
2008	Big Brother: Celebrity Hijack	Presenter	
2009	Rock Profile	Presenter	Series 3
2010	Question Time: First Time Voters	Presenter	One-off episode
2010	Dermot Meets...	Presenter	1 series
2010	A League of Their Own	Guest Team Captain	2 episodes
2010–present	Soccer Aid	Co-presenter	Annually; 7 episodes with Kirsty Gallacher
2010–2019	The National Television Awards	Presenter	10 ceremonies
2011	Live from the Royal Wedding	Presenter	One-off episode
2011	The Marriage Ref	Presenter	1 series
2012	Sport Relief	Co–presenter	1 episode, with Davina McCall
2013	From the Heart	Presenter	One-off episode
2013	BRITs Icon: Elton John	Presenter	One-off episode
2014	Live From Space	Presenter	3 episodes
2014, 2020	This Morning	Stand–in Co–presenter	9 episodes
2015	Children in Need	Co-presenter	Main role, with Tess Daly and Fearne Cotton
2016	The Getaway Car	Presenter	1 series
2016	The One Show	Guest Presenter	2 episodes
2017	BRIT Awards	Co-presenter	37th event with Emma Willis
2017	The Nightly Show	Guest Presenter	9 episodes
2018	The Royal Wedding of Prince Harry and Meghan Markle	Commentator	2 episodes
2018	Reel Stories: Kylie Minogue	Host	BBC Two programme
2019	Icons: The Greatest Person of the 20th Century	Category Presenter ("Advocate")	2 episodes
2019	Small Fortune	Presenter	1 series
2019	The X Factor: Celebrity	Presenter	1 series
2019	The X Factor: The Band	Presenter	1 series
2020	One World: Together at Home	Co–presenter	One-off special
2020	Goodwood SpeedWeek	Presenter	
2021	British Academy Film Awards	Co–presenter	With Edith Bowman
2021	The Pet Show	Co–presenter	With Joanna Page
2021	An Audience with Arsène Wenger and David Dein	Presenter	One-off special
2021	48 Hours to Victory	Co-presenter	Three-part Channel 4 series
2021	Reel Stories: Sting	Presenter	BBC Two programme
2021–present	This Morning	Co-presenter	Fridays; with Alison Hammond
2022	Reel Stories: Robbie Williams	Presenter	BBC Two programme
2023	Inside No. 9	Himself	1 episode; "Paraskevidekatriaphobia"
2023	The Chase for Soccer Aid	Contestant	Soccer Aid celebrity special
2023	Reel Stories: Noel Gallagher	Host	BBC Two programme
2023	Remarkable Places to Eat	Himself	Guest; one episode
2024	Saving Lives at Sea in World War II	Presenter	
2024	The Great Celebrity Bake Off for Stand Up To Cancer	Contestant	
2024	Reel Stories: Jon Bon Jovi	Host	BBC Two programme
2024	Reel Stories: Shania Twain	Host	BBC Two programme
2024, 2026	Dermot O'Leary's Taste of Ireland	Presenter	Food and travel series; two series aired
2025	Silence is Golden	Host	Comedy game show
2025	The Masked Singer	Mistletoe	Christmas Special
2025-present	NFL on 5	Host	With Sam Quek and Osi Umenyiora
2026	Reel Stories: Rick Astley	Host	BBC Two programme

== Radio ==
Year	Network	Slot	Notes
2001–2002	XFM	Weekday mornings	
2002–2003	XFM	Saturday evenings	Show called The Weekender
2004–2005	BBC Radio 2	Saturdays 2 – 4 pm	Show called Dermot's Saturday Club
2005–2006	BBC Radio 2	Saturdays 5 – 7 pm	
2006–2007	BBC Radio 2	Saturdays 4:30 – 6:30 pm	2 pm – 4 pm (during The X Factor months)
2008–2009	BBC Radio 2	Saturdays 2 – 5 pm	
2009–2017	BBC Radio 2	Saturdays 3 – 6 pm	
2017–	BBC Radio 2	Saturdays 8 – 10 am	Show called Saturday Breakfast with Dermot
