= Cochrane Theatre =

Former theatre in London, England

- Jeanetta Cochrane Theatre
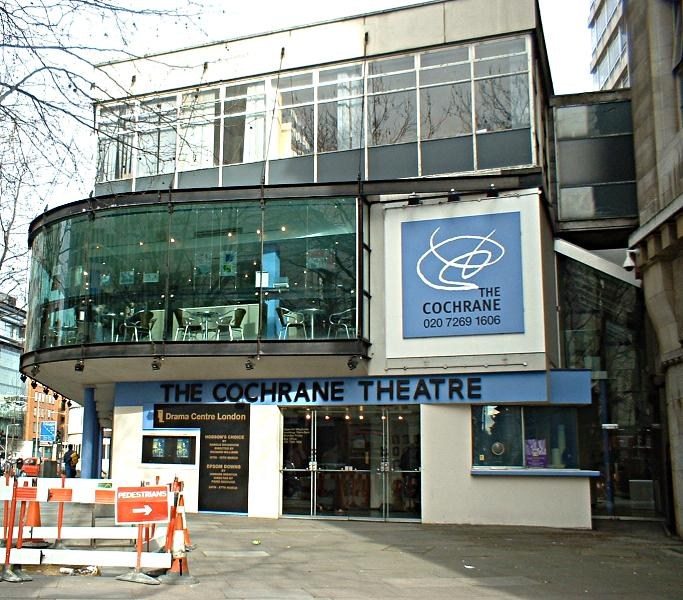
- Cochrane Theatre
- Interactive map of Cochrane Theatre
- Location: Southampton Row; London, WC1; United Kingdom
- Coordinates: 51°31′09″N 00°07′13″W
- Owner: University of the Arts London
- Capacity: 314 seated
- Designation: UK
- Public transit: Holborn

Construction
- Opened: 1963
- Closed: 2012
- Years active: 49
- Architect: LCC Architects' Dept

The Cochrane Theatre, previously known as the Jeanetta Cochrane Theatre, was a receiving and producing theatre situated in Holborn, London, that opened in 1964. It is now used for television filming.

== History ==
The theatre opened in 1963 and was named after its founder, Jeannetta Cochrane, who was a theatre practitioner specialising in costume and scenery design at the Central School of Art and Design, now part of the University of the Arts London. Through her persistence, Cochrane persuaded the London County Council to build a theatre attached to the school that could be used as a practice space. The theatre has a traditional proscenium arch and fly tower consisting of 41 counterweight flying bars, orchestra pit and a fully functioning paint frame (a rarity in London theatres).

From 1991 to 1995, Talawa Theatre Company had its home at the Cochrane Theatre.

The Cochrane closed in January 2012 when Central St Martin's moved to a new site near King's Cross (unifying what had been disparate locations for different parts of the college), with the new venue having its own theatre, the Platform Theatre.

Its owners since 2011, Grange Hotels, are set to demolish the building.

== Television productions ==
In June 2015 Channel 4 filmed a TFI Friday special at the theatre and a series of ten shows were produced live in October through December 2015.

Cochrane Theatre was chosen for the new series as the original location of Riverside Studios where the show was filmed has been demolished and is being redeveloped, due for completion in autumn 2017.

ITV's late night chat show The Nightly Show was filmed at the Cochrane Theatre in 2017.

Channel 5's Do the Right Thing with Eamonn Holmes and Ruth Langsford was filmed at the Cochrane Theatre in 2019.
