= My Favourite Time of Year =

Single by The Florin Street Band
- Released: Christmas 2010; Christmas 2011
- Recorded: 2010
- Genre: Christmas music
- Songwriter: Leigh Haggerwood

Music video
- "My Favourite Time of Year" on YouTube

"My Favourite Time of Year" is a Christmas song performed by The Florin Street Band which was written and sung by British composer Leigh Haggerwood in 2010. His aim was to create a song with strong melodies that would match the classics, and bring back the Christmas magic that he felt had been missing from the UK charts for decades. Haggerwood was disappointed by the yearly non-festive songs released by The X Factor finalists, and the protests that ensued which seemed more concerned with spiting Simon Cowell than bringing back Christmas songs. When writing the song, he recalled his own childhood in the early 1980s. "My Favourite Time of Year" evolves around a catchy, carol-like melody which weaves up and down the major scales of Eb and Bb. The song is piano-led with instrumentation that includes many traditional Christmas elements such as orchestral chimes, choral harmonies and string lines.

== The Florin Street Band ==
Leigh Haggerwood's vision for the song included a Victorian-themed band. After several years of pitching the concept to major labels, who wouldn't compete with The X Factor, he eventually decided to fund it himself using his personal savings. He contacted his session musician friends and employed their services to record the song at Trevor Horn's Sarm Studios in London, England. He also hired The English Chamber Choir to perform the choral parts, and the song was recorded over seven days in August 2010. The large ensemble of musicians was collectively named The Florin Street Band and many of the musicians that performed on the recording also appeared in the music video.

== Music video ==
Leigh's original vision for the song included a music video set in Victorian England. The intention was to depict a working-class man walking through snow-lined streets looking in on the festivities, and after a long search, it was agreed that British director Nick Bartleet would direct the video. Blists Hill Victorian Town at Ironbridge Museum's in Shropshire was chosen as the location due to its authentic recreation of a Victorian street which would become Florin Street in the video. As the project evolved, respected cinematographer John Perez - known for his work on Coldplay's "Viva la Vida" and videos by Beyoncé and Rihanna - offered his services. Over 100 cast and crew gathered for the overnight shoot at Blists Hill in October 2010, and due to the tight budget, the video had to be shot relatively quickly.

== Reception ==
Owing to the lack of a major record company backing, it was initially very difficult to promote the song. Mainstream radio stations were resistant to airing the record because "it wasn't coming from a major label" which is often a benchmark. However, the song and video gained minor prominence through social networking sites. Its initial release on 6 December 2010 peaked at 14 in the UK Indie Breakers Chart.

In August 2011, the United States Army Band (known as "Pershing's Own") requested permission to arrange the song for their annual Christmas concerts at the DAR Constitution Hall in Washington D.C. "My Favourite Time of Year" was requested for use in popular TV and radio shows and Leigh received requests to perform it from schools, choirs, orchestras, churches, theatrical productions and youth groups. The song has been supported by Jamie Oliver, with whom Haggerwood started a band named Scarlet Division in 1988. It won the UK Songwriting Contest

== Text Santa ==
Elements of the song were chosen to accompany ITV's Christmas charity appeal, Text Santa; The producers were keen to use "My Favourite Time of Year" as the theme music to the appeal, which Leigh Haggerwood agreed to. With his experience as a media composer, he re-versioned the song and created other original music for the shows.

Text Santa is a charity initiative first broadcast on UK television network, ITV, in 2011. The project aims to raise money and awareness for a selection of charities during the festive season and is heavily promoted by ITV in the form of TV shows, radio and sponsorship by brands such as Asda supermarkets and Vodafone.

== Follow-ups ==
Florin Street Band released two follow-up Christmas singles with new videos prepared. The main vocals on both songs as in the case of the original song were by Leigh Haggerwood.

The first song was released on 15 December 2013 titled "Winter Wonder". The music video was shot at Tithe Barn at Englishcombe. The song won Best Christmas Song and Best Music Video in the 2014 UK Songwriting Contest. The three-track EP containing "Winter Wonder" also included the video edit of "My Favourite Time of Year".

The second Christmas song was released on 26 November 2015 titled "Light Our Way" and was tipped to be part of a Christmas musical under production. Some scenes were filmed in Ironbridge Museum, and some outdoor scenes at the Wye Valley in Wales, Dartmoor and Exmoor National Parks in Devon, and Bath, Somerset.

== Notes ==
- Shropshire Tourism
- PR Newswire Press Release
- BBC News Article
- Herts and Essex Observer
- The Florin Street Band
- Text Santa Homepage
- Shropshire Live
- Vodafone Big Top 40 - Florin Street Band Page
- Jamieoliver.com Article
