= From the Heart (TV campaign) =

- Genre: Charity
- Created by: ITV Studios
- Presented by: Dermot O'Leary
- Country of origin: United Kingdom

Production
- Production location: The London Studios
- Production company: ITV Studios

Original release
- Network: ITV
- Release: February 2013

Related
- Text Santa, ITV Telethon

From the Heart is a campaign initiative set up in 2013 by ITV to raise awareness for organ donations. The campaign took place between 11 and 15 February 2013. ITV shows including Daybreak, This Morning and ITV News. On 24 July 2014, ITV confirmed that the telethon had been axed and would not be produced again.

== 2013 campaign ==
=== Tonight special ===
On Wednesday 13 February, an evening of awareness took place on ITV. From 8pm, an hour-long episode of Tonight, presented by Jonathan Maitland aired, highlighting the need for organ donations.

=== Entertainment special ===
At 9pm, an hour-long entertainment special entitled From the Heart, presented by Dermot O'Leary aired, starring the likes of Rowan Atkinson, Hugh Laurie, Pixie Lott, Alexandra Burke and McFly.
