= Matt Skinner =

Australian sommelier

- Born: December 23, 1974 (age 51); Melbourne, Victoria, Australia
- Occupations: Sommelier, author, consultant
- Awards: see below
- Website: www.mattskinner.com.au

Matthew "Matt" Skinner (born 23 December 1974) is an Australian sommelier, wine author, consultant and educator. Matt co-founded Fifteen Restaurant with Jamie Oliver and Tobie Puttock, and appeared in two television series with Puttock called Tobie & Matt.

== Background ==
Skinner was born in Melbourne, Australia. After many years abroad, he returned to Melbourne in 2008 where he now lives with his wife Carly and their two children.

== Career ==
Skinner's career began as a bottle shop attendant at the Whitehorse Inn Hotel in 1993. After completing an introductory wine course, he moved onto other sales assistant roles before being appointed manager at the Prince Wine Store in 1996. In 2000, Skinner was introduced by Tobie Puttock to British chef Jamie Oliver, who in 2001 asked him to relocate to the UK to help set up Fifteen.

Skinner was involved for six years overseeing wine operations for the group (they opened four branches of Fifteen) and was Head Sommelier at Fifteen London during that time. He also held consultancy roles with Match Group UK and Sainsbury's UK.

Today Skinner continues to consult to the Jamie's Italian group of restaurants in Australia, working closely with the team on wine list development & training. He also holds an ambassadorial role with Plumm Wine Glasses and is a Wine Selection Panel Member for Jetstar International Airlines.

== Books and awards ==
Skinner was named Best Young International Wine Writer 2012 by the Grandi Cru d'Italia, and has three times been short-listed for the IWSC International Wine Communicator of the Year Award. He is a regular contributor to Sunday Life, Australian Good Food, Gourmet Traveller WINE, and Home Beautiful. In the past, he wrote for GQ (2008–2009), Sunday Magazine (2006–2008), Waitrose Food Illustrated UK (2006–2008) and Sainsbury's Magazine (2008). Skinner is also author of international bestsellers Thirsty Work, Heard It Through The Grapevine, The Juice, and Matt Skinner's Wine Guide 2011. Thirsty Work has been published in 19 countries, in 10 languages and was awarded Best Educational Wine Book UK at Gourmand World Cook Book Awards 2006. Thirsty Work was also short-listed at Louis Roederer International Wine Writing Awards. The Juice was awarded Best Wine Guide UK at Gourmand World Cookbook awards 2007 Heard it through the Grapevine has been published in 12 countries and in 8 languages.

== Television ==
Skinner appeared with Puttock for two series of Tobie & Matt on the Lifestyle Food channel. He has also appeared with Gordon Ramsay on Gordon Ramsay – The F Word (Channel 4), with Jamie Oliver on Oliver's Twist – (Food Network/Lifestyle Food) and Jamie's Kitchen – (Channel 4). Skinner was also seen on Saturday Cooks (ITV 1), Saturday Kitchen (BBC 1), Food Uncut (UK Food), Taste (Sky) and Great Food Live (UK Food)

== Judging ==
Skinner has been appointed judge at the following wine shows.

- Royal Melbourne Wine Show 2010 – Current
- Decanter World Wine Awards 2005–2007
- Australian Alternative Varieties Wine Show 2007
- Australian Boutique Wine Awards 2008

== Other projects ==
- National Ambassador for MOVEMBER 2010 & 2011
- Host at Good Food & Wine Show; London, Birmingham, Melbourne, Brisbane, Perth, Adelaide & Sydney, co-hosting a food and wine show with Tobie Puttock and hosting stand-alone wine tasting tutorials & master classes
- Host at The Wine Show; London, hosting wine tasting seminars and wine tours.
- The Drinks List; a new wine project started in 2016 with Prince Wine Store partners Alex Wilcox & Michael McNamara.
