= Petrolheads =

- Genre: Panel show
- Created by: Norman Giller
- Presented by: Neil Morrissey
- Starring: Chris Barrie; Richard Hammond
- Country of origin: United Kingdom
- Original language: English
- No. of series: 1
- No. of episodes: 6 (list of episodes)

Production
- Production location: Fountain Studios
- Running time: 30 minutes
- Production companies: Scarlet Television; On The Box

Original release
- Network: BBC Two
- Release: 12 February – 19 March 2006

Petrolheads is a BBC television panel game presented by Neil Morrissey, with team captains Richard Hammond and Chris Barrie. The show pitted motoring wits against each other and included car stunts shot on location. There were two guests each episode. The show was produced by Brian Klein (Top Gear), directed by John L Spencer and executive producers were Marie-Claire Walton and Steve Ayres. The theme music was by British composer Leigh Haggerwood. It was created and scripted by author Norman Giller, with input from Top Gear writer Richard Porter and comedy scriptwriter Ged Parsons.

== Episode list ==
The coloured backgrounds denote the result of each of the shows:

– Indicates Chris's team won
– Indicates Richard's team won

No.	Chris' guest	Richard's guest	Winning team	Original release date
1	Philip Glenister	Hugo Speer	Chris	12 February 2006
2	Ronan Keating	Eamonn Holmes	Chris	19 February 2006
3	John Gordon Sinclair	Edith Bowman	Richard	26 February 2006
4	Murray Walker	James May	Chris	5 March 2006
5	Ricky Tomlinson	James Martin	Richard	12 March 2006
6	John Thomson	Fearne Cotton	Chris	19 March 2006
