= Shattered (British TV series) =

2004 reality television program in the United Kingdom

- Genre: Reality television
- Creative director: Tim Hincks
- Presented by: Dermot O'Leary
- Starring: Neil Stanley; Dr. Gareth Smith
- Country of origin: United Kingdom
- Original language: English
- No. of series: 1
- No. of episodes: 7

Production
- Executive producer: Philip Edgar-Jones
- Producers: Jilly Pearce; Rob Wakeling; Kate Bates
- Production company: Endemol UK Productions

Original release
- Network: Channel 4
- Release: 4 January – 10 January 2004

Related
- Big Brother

Shattered is a reality television programme shown on Channel 4 in the United Kingdom, aired in January 2004 and presented by Dermot O'Leary.

Ten contestants were challenged with going without sleep for seven days while their actions were monitored, undergoing daily performance testing and a variety of challenges. They were competing for a potential prize fund of £100,000, with deductions made from the prize fund every time a contestant fell asleep.

== Premise and challenges ==
Shattered was filmed in a specially constructed "laboratory" inside an abandoned shopping centre in Wapping. The ten participants selected for the show were aged between 19 and 33, with one eliminated each night until the "sleep-off". They were initially kept awake for 36 hours, with a two-hour nap permitted before the live first episode. No medicines, alcohol, drugs, electronic equipment, mobile phones or musical instruments were allowed to be used. Performance tests included physical and mental tests, including tests of memory. Contestants were put forward for an elimination challenge after showing the greatest deterioration in performance in a day.

=== You Snooze You Lose ===
Every day a contestant was chosen by their peers to endure an hour-long "You Snooze You Lose" challenge, in which the chosen contestant was tasked with remaining awake through an experience intended to encourage them to fall asleep. These challenges included cuddling teddy bears, listening to a bedtime story in an overheated room, and watching paint dry while seated in a comfortable chair.

=== The Sleep-Off ===
On the final day the contestants were sent to bed, with the last to fall asleep winning. The show reported that Jonathan Wood and Chris Wandel fell asleep within 15 minutes while Clare Southern continued to stay awake for nearly two hours, until producers intervened. She endured 178 hours of sleep deprivation, and won £97,000 in prize money.

== Health effects ==
Contestants were provided with intermittent naps, daily sessions with a psychiatrist and doctor, and a doctor on call 24 hours a day during filming, with an ethics board adivising on issues surrounding the show. However, adverse effects of the sleep deprivation were evident in some contestants. For example, Chris reported major hallucinations and believed himself to be the Prime Minister of Australia, and Lucy left the show after consulting with the show's psychologists. None of the contestants reported significant long-term health consequences, with only weight gain and jet lag lasting a few days reported.

== Reception ==
34 complaints were made to Ofcom about the effects of sleep deprivation on the contestants, as well as concern about the premise of the show. Ofcom said none of its programme guidelines were breached, and Channel 4 denied exploitation of the contestants, as well as emphasising the presence of ethics advisers and medical staff during filming.

1.8 million viewers watched both the first and second episodes of the programme.
