= Christmas jumper =

Sweater with a Christmas or winter-style design

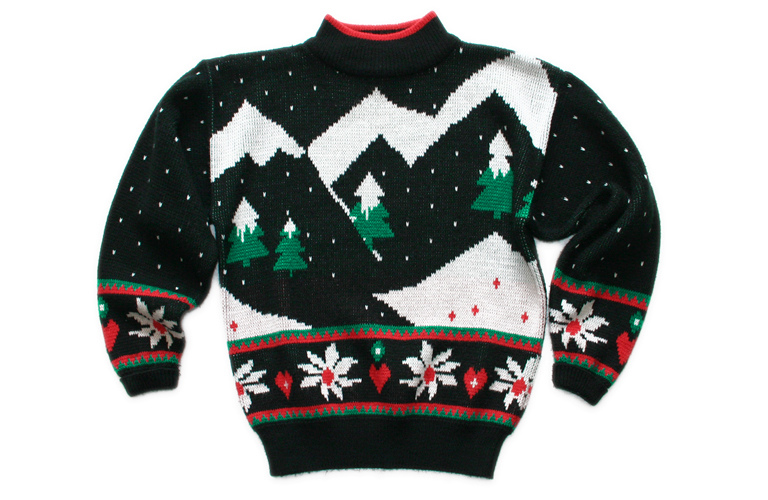
- An example of a 1980s Christmas jumper
- Type: jumper

A Christmas jumper (British English, Hiberno-English and Australian English) or Christmas sweater (North American English), also ugly sweater for their over-the-top designs, is a sweater themed with a Christmas or winter design, often worn during the festive season. These elaborately figured sweaters are more often knitted than crocheted. A more traditional approach is a roll neck (or "turtleneck") top-pulled garment. Embellishments such as tinsel, reindeer, or sparkles are considered to make such a sweater "ugly".

== History ==
In the United Kingdom, Christmas jumpers became popular during the 1980s after a variety of television presenters such as Gyles Brandreth and Timmy Mallett began wearing them during the Christmas holidays. In particular, their popularity may be attributed to the influence of singers such as Andy Williams and Val Doonican, who appeared in these types of jumpers in their television Christmas specials. In Ireland, The Late Late Show's host wears an extravagant jumper for the Christmas Late Late Toy Show. They are often seen as a hand-made present knitted by an elderly relative that are given as a Christmas present. During the 1990s and 2000s they were seen as gag gifts and fell out of favour and featured as something to be embarrassed by as in the 2001 film Bridget Jones's Diary.

During the early 2000s, the modern Ugly Christmas Sweater phenomenon emerged in North America as an ironic fashion trend celebrating intentionally gaudy, nostalgic, or humorous holiday attire. Several media accounts have credited Vancouver-area Ugly Christmas Sweater parties organized by Chris Boyd and Jordan Birch with helping popularize the modern ugly Christmas sweater trend. The first party was held in 2002 in Coquitlam, British Columbia, and later expanded to Vancouver's Commodore Ballroom, where annual gatherings attracted approximately 1,000 attendees.

The popularity of ugly sweater parties reflected broader cultural interests in nostalgia, retro fashion, and irony. Participants often sourced sweaters from thrift stores or family collections, transforming garments that had previously been viewed as outdated or unfashionable into a form of holiday celebration. By the late 2000s, ugly Christmas sweater parties, contests, charity events, and themed gatherings had become increasingly common across North America.

The resurgence of Christmas sweaters also led to increased commercialization. By the early 2010s, major retailers began producing sweaters intentionally designed to appear humorous, kitschy, or extravagant rather than traditional holiday knitwear. The trend expanded into workplaces, schools, bar crawls, and community events, while specialty companies dedicated to novelty holiday apparel emerged to meet growing consumer demand.

They gained camp appeal during the 2010s, with online retailer Amazon reporting an increase in sales of 600% in 2011, and the trend has been followed by a number of celebrities. Ugly Christmas Sweater Contests are held annually in the United States.

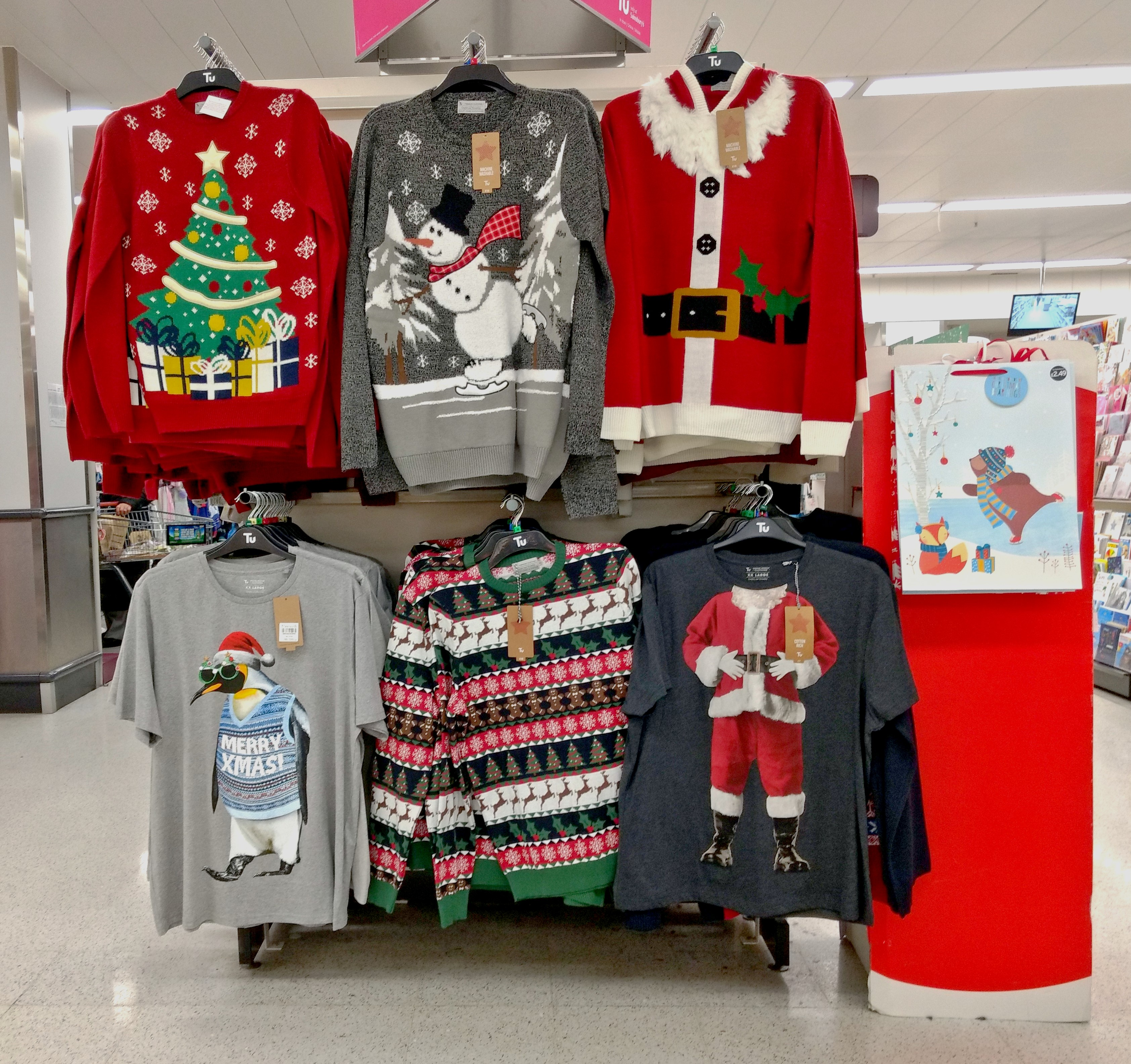
Christmas jumpers and T-shirts in a British supermarket, 2016

In 2012, the British newspaper The Daily Telegraph described them as "this season's must have", with retailer Topman selling 34 different designs alone and reporting sales had increased 54% compared to 2011. Higher end fashion labels have also produced Christmas jumpers, including Burberry and Jil Sander, and even metal band Slayer released one as part of their merchandise range.

The charity Save the Children runs an annual Christmas Jumper Day each year in December using the slogan "Make the world better with a sweater". It encourages people to raise money for the charity by wearing their Christmas jumpers on a specific day. The New York Times reported in 2012 that a major venue for sweater sales are independent company websites, with ugly-sweater themed names.

Environmental charity Hubbub reported in 2019 that up to 95% of Christmas jumpers are made using plastic, and that two-fifths of them are worn only once. A spokeswoman for Hubbub described the Christmas jumper as "one of the worst examples of fast fashion" and urged people to "swap, buy second-hand or re-wear" rather than buy new.
