= Christmas Jumper Day =

Annual fundraising campaign in the UK and Ireland

Christmas Jumper Day is an annual fundraising campaign in the UK and Ireland organised by charity Save the Children in the UK. On a specific day in December, people are encouraged to raise funds for Save the Children by wearing a Christmas jumper and making a suggested donation of £1 (€1) for school children and £2 (€2) for adults.

In recent years, Save the Children has been eager to ensure Christmas Jumper Day is as sustainable as possible. Those taking part can wear a Christmas jumper they already own, shop for a vintage jumper, decorate an existing jumper with festive decorations, or even knit their own.

Christmas Jumper Day is popular with schools and workplaces. Groups may take part in additional fundraising activities on the day, as well as making donations.

Save the Children launched their Christmas Jumper Day in 2012 on Friday, 14 December, and have since raised £30 million to help children around the world.

Celebrities who have supported the event in the past include TV presenter Holly Willoughby, actor Helen Mirren, model Kate Moss, actor Luke Evans and Olympian Mo Farah.
