= The Nightly Show (British TV series) =

2017 British television series

- Genre: Comedy, news satire, talk show
- Presented by: David Walliams; John Bishop; Davina McCall; Dermot O'Leary; Gordon Ramsay; Bradley Walsh; Jason Manford
- Theme music composer: Medina Sound
- Opening theme: "Almost (Feel It)" by Medina Sound
- Ending theme: "Almost (Feel It)" by Medina Sound
- Country of origin: United Kingdom
- Original language: English
- No. of series: 1
- No. of episodes: 39

Production
- Executive producers: Katie Taylor; Lee Hupfield
- Production location: Cochrane Theatre
- Running time: 30 minutes (inc. adverts)
- Production company: Second Act Productions

Original release
- Network: ITV
- Release: 27 February – 23 April 2017

The Nightly Show was a British late-night entertainment and chat show hosted by various presenters each week, which premiered on 27 February 2017 and ended on 23 April 2017. The show aired on ITV at 10:00 pm on Monday to Friday evenings. Each episode was taped at the Cochrane Theatre in London at 6:00 pm, every weekday, four hours before that night's episode was scheduled to air on ITV.

Before the show's premiere, non-broadcast pilot episodes were filmed in December 2016 and February 2017 to test filming equipment, audience interaction and the show's set design.

The main purpose of The Nightly Show was to serve as a British response to the popularity of late-night television shows present in the United States, such as Jimmy Kimmel Live!, The Late Show with Stephen Colbert, The Late Late Show with James Corden and The Tonight Show Starring Jimmy Fallon.

Due to underperforming viewing figures and poor critical reception, ITV decided not to renew the show for a second series.

== Format ==
ITV said the series would feature a "high tempo mixture of topical monologue, studio games, celebrity guests, experts and VTs (pre-recorded items)". It has been described by the British media as a cross between Ant & Dec's Saturday Night Takeaway and The Late Late Show with James Corden.

== Presenters ==
Series 1 (2017)
Week	Episodes	Dates	Hosts
1	1–5	27 February – 3 March	David Walliams
2	6–10	6–10 March	John Bishop
3	11–15	13–17 March	Davina McCall
4	16–19	20–24 March	Dermot O'Leary
5	20–24	27–31 March	Gordon Ramsay
6	25–29	3–7 April	Bradley Walsh
7	30–34	10–14 April	Jason Manford
8	35–39	17–21 April	Dermot O'Leary

== Episodes ==
Series	Episodes	Originally Aired	
Series	Episodes	Series premiere	Series finale
1	39	27 February 2017	21 April 2017

=== Series 1 (2017) ===
The episode due to air on Wednesday 22 March 2017 was cancelled due to ongoing ITV News coverage of the Westminster attack, reducing the series episode count to 39. The post-midnight repeat was replaced by a repeat of Countrywise.

On Monday 27 March 2017, ITV lost signal before going into the second part of the episode. The episode finished three minutes later than usual.

On Tuesday 18 April 2017, the show was transmitted late at 11.00 pm because of extended news coverage resulting from the announcement of the UK general election which replaced the regular 10:00 pm slot.

Episode no.	Date	Host(s)	Guests	Viewing figures (millions)
1	27 February 2017	David Walliams	Martin Clunes and Nina Conti	2.86 (overnight)
2	28 February 2017	David Walliams	Kim Cattrall and Katherine Ryan	1.30 (overnight)
3	1 March 2017	David Walliams	Rob Brydon and Forrest Galante	2.01 (overnight)
4	2 March 2017	David Walliams	David Haye, Tom Payne and Ross Marquand	1.30 (overnight)
5	3 March 2017	David Walliams	will.i.am, Jennifer Hudson, Sir Tom Jones, Gavin Rossdale and John Bishop	1.38 (overnight)
–	5 March 2017	David Walliams	Compilation Show	
6	6 March 2017	John Bishop	Roger Daltrey	2.36 (overnight)
7	7 March 2017	John Bishop	Martin Kemp and Sandra Strong	1.53 (overnight)
8	8 March 2017	John Bishop	Fay Ripley	1.69 (overnight)
9	9 March 2017	John Bishop	Pamela Anderson and Tony Bellew	1.40 (overnight)
10	10 March 2017	John Bishop	Joan Collins, Davina McCall and Adam Ant	1.45 (overnight)
–	12 March 2017	John Bishop	Compilation Show	
11	13 March 2017	Davina McCall^{1}	Boy George and Vicky McClure	1.80 (overnight)
12	14 March 2017	Davina McCall^{1}	David Baddiel and Sara Cox	1.03 (overnight)
13	15 March 2017	Davina McCall^{1}	Paddy McGuinness and Julian Clary	1.34 (overnight)
14	16 March 2017	Davina McCall^{1}	Kimberly Wyatt, Jack Savoretti, The Cuban Brothers and Ben Hanlin	1.16 (overnight)
15	17 March 2017	Davina McCall^{1}	Melanie C and Dermot O'Leary	0.993 (overnight)
–	19 March 2017	Davina McCall^{1}	Compilation Show	
16	20 March 2017	Dermot O'Leary^{2}	Catherine Tate and Ruby Wax	1.60 (overnight)
17	21 March 2017	Dermot O'Leary^{2}	Vic and Bob and David O'Doherty	0.97 (overnight)
--	22 March 2017	Dermot O'Leary^{2}	(Cancelled due to rolling ITV News coverage of the Westminster Attack.)	--
18	23 March 2017	Dermot O'Leary^{2}	Ant & Dec and James Blunt	1.26 (overnight)
19	24 March 2017	Dermot O'Leary^{2}	Rupert Everett, Gordon Ramsay and Blossoms	0.714 (overnight)
–	26 March 2017	Dermot O'Leary^{2}	Compilation Show	
20	27 March 2017	Gordon Ramsay	Ricky Wilson, Frank Skinner and Ben Hanlin	1.48 (overnight)
21	28 March 2017	Gordon Ramsay	Sally Phillips and John Lydon	0.905 (overnight)
22	29 March 2017	Gordon Ramsay	Chris Moyles and Gizzi Erskine	1.29 (overnight)
23	30 March 2017	Gordon Ramsay	James Van Der Beek and Scott Eastwood	0.993 (overnight)
24	31 March 2017	Gordon Ramsay	John Legend and Bradley Walsh	1.14 (overnight)
–	2 April 2017	Gordon Ramsay	Compilation Show	
25	3 April 2017	Bradley Walsh^{3}	Michael Bolton and Vinnie Jones	2.21 (overnight)
26	4 April 2017	Bradley Walsh^{3}	Sara Pascoe, Philip Glenister and Lucy Kane	1.36 (overnight)
27	5 April 2017	Bradley Walsh^{3}	Jamie Bamber, Tommy Tiernan and Harriet Walter	1.70 (overnight)
28	6 April 2017	Bradley Walsh^{3}	Russell Watson and Dave Johns	1.51 (overnight)
29	7 April 2017	Bradley Walsh^{3}	Louise Redknapp, Hal Cruttenden and Jason Manford	1.28 (overnight)
–	9 April 2017	Bradley Walsh^{3}	Compilation Show	
30	10 April 2017	Jason Manford^{4}	Jane McDonald, Ricky Tomlinson and Matt Lucas	1.62 (overnight)
31	11 April 2017	Jason Manford^{4}	Kelly Brook and Richard Osman	0.906 (overnight)
32	12 April 2017	Jason Manford^{4}	Freddie Flintoff and Nigel Havers	1.42 (overnight)
33	13 April 2017	Jason Manford^{4}	Ronni Ancona, Sofie Hagen and Kriss Akabusi	1.16 (overnight)
34	14 April 2017	Jason Manford^{4}	Larry Lamb, Phil Daniels and Max Beesley	0.978 (overnight)
–	16 April 2017	Jason Manford^{4}	Compilation Show	
35	17 April 2017	Dermot O'Leary^{2}	Lee Mack and Eamonn Holmes	2.20 (overnight)
36	18 April 2017	Dermot O'Leary^{2}	Tom Davis, Megan Mullally and Only Girl	0.450 (overnight)
37	19 April 2017	Dermot O'Leary^{2}	Jon Culshaw and Kym Marsh	1.45 (overnight)
38	20 April 2017	Dermot O'Leary^{2}	Martin Compston and Dennis Quaid	1.05 (overnight)
39	21 April 2017	Dermot O'Leary^{2}	John Cleese and Sharleen Spiteri	0.986 (overnight)
–	23 April 2017	Dermot O'Leary^{2}	Compilation Show	

1. McCall's week also featured DJ 'Fat Tony' as the house DJ.
2. O'Leary's weeks also featured Joe Thompson as the house pianist.
3. Walsh's week also featured Stevie Sidwell and the West End All Stars as the house band, Joe Pasquale as the 'roving reporter' and Redd Pepper as the announcer.
4. Manford's week also featured Stevie Sidwell and The Nightly Show All Stars as the house band and Ellie Taylor as the announcer.

== Weekly average viewing figures ==
Week	Host	Viewing figures (millions)
1	David Walliams	1.74
2	John Bishop	1.69
3	Davina McCall	1.26
4	Dermot O'Leary	1.14
5	Gordon Ramsay	1.16
6	Bradley Walsh	1.61
7	Jason Manford	1.22
8	Dermot O'Leary	1.23

The average per show over all eight weeks was 1.38 million.

== Reception ==
Upon the show's debut, it received a negative critical reception from many, with attacks on the show via Twitter, mainly due to the show being branded by some viewers as unfunny and a "rip-off" of the format used heavily in the United States, as well as the push back of the airing of ITV News at Ten to 10:30 pm. According to an inside source from ITV, The Nightly Show could be moved to airing after ITV News at Ten if viewing figures continue to decline. It was reported that Walliams would be paid £250,000 for his week's work. Mel and Sue were planned to host one of the weeks, but cited a 'busy schedule' as the reason for their cancellation.

ITV stated that the show would not return in 2018 due to low viewing figures.
