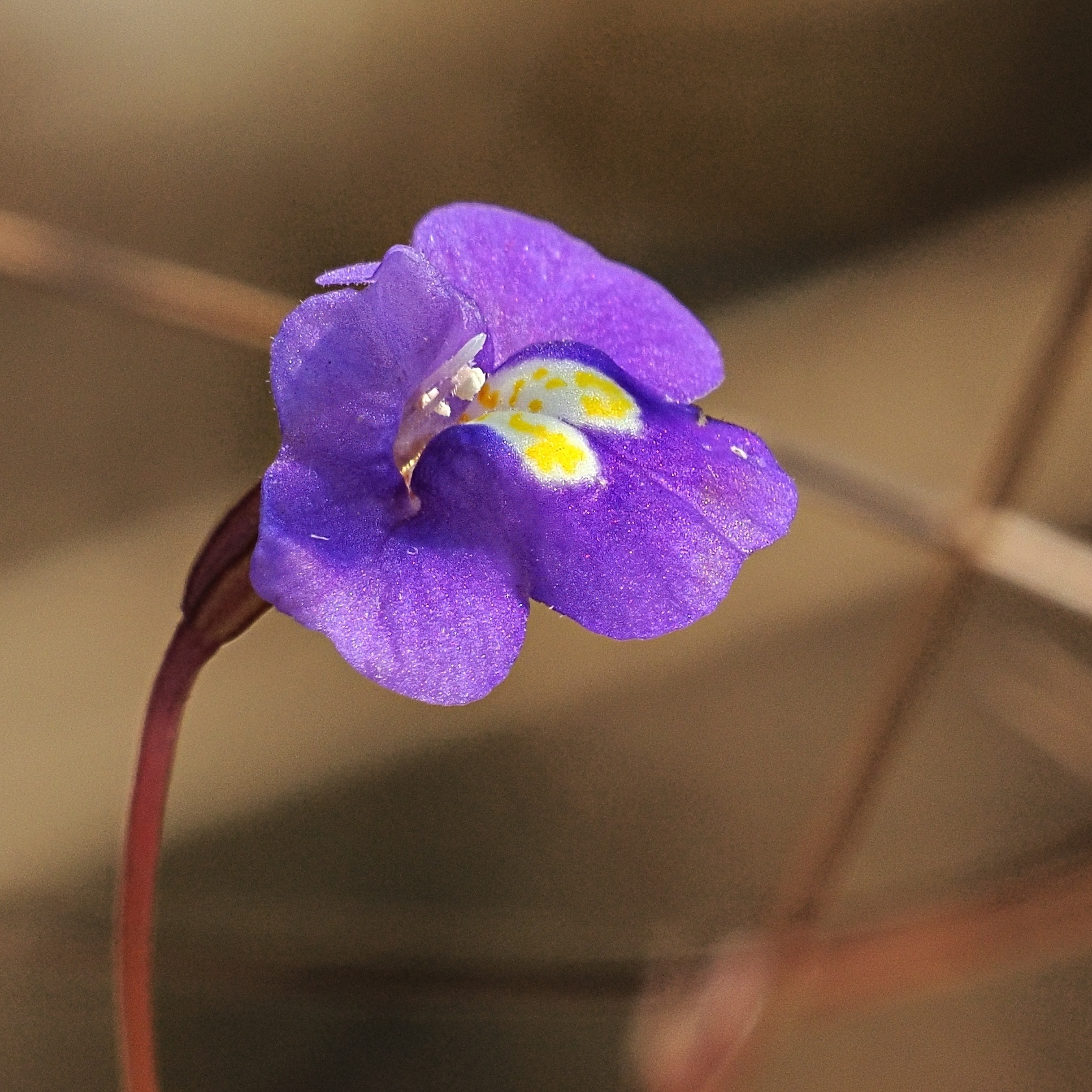
- Uvedalia linearis

Scientific classification
- Kingdom: Plantae
- Clade: Embryophytes
- Clade: Tracheophytes
- Clade: Angiosperms
- Clade: Eudicots
- Clade: Asterids
- Order: Lamiales
- Family: Phrymaceae
- Genus: Uvedalia; R.Br.

Species
- See text

= Uvedalia =

Genus of plants in the lopseed family

Uvedalia is a genus of flowering plants in the family Phrymaceae, native to Australia. It was resurrected from Mimulus in 2012.

It was first described in 1810 by Robert Brown. The type species is Uvedalia linearis.

== Species ==
Currently accepted species include:

- Uvedalia clementii (Domin) W.R.Barker & Beardsley
- Uvedalia linearis R.Br.
