= Charrington =

Charrington is a surname. Notable people with the name include:

- Brian Charrington (1956–2025), English drug trafficker
- Cecil Ernest Wells Charrington (1885–1962), English brewing executive
- Charles Charrington (1854–1926), British actor and barrister
- Frederick Nicholas Charrington (1850–1936), English social reformer
- Jo Charrington, music industry executive
- Robin Montgomerie-Charrington (1915–2007), British racing driver from England
- Spencer Charrington (1818–1904), English brewer and Conservative politician

== See also ==
- Charrington Brewery, founded in Bethnal Green, London, in the early 18th century by Robert Westfield
- Charrington Tower, a 44-storey residential tower on the north side of the River Thames in the Blackwall area of east London
