= WOW! (TV series) =

- Genre: Children's
- Presented by: Simeon Courtie; Sophie Aldred; Peter Cocks; Phil Cornwell
- Country of origin: United Kingdom
- Original language: English
- No. of series: 1
- No. of episodes: 16

Production
- Production location: The Maidstone Studios
- Running time: 95 minutes
- Production company: The Media Merchants in association with Meridian

Original release
- Network: ITV
- Release: 31 August – 14 December 1996

WOW! is a children's entertainment magazine programme, broadcast in 1996 on the UK's ITV television network (under the CITV branding). It aired for 16 weeks from 31 August to 14 December 1996, preceded by the Summer 1996 run of Scratchy & Co. and followed by the spring 1997 run of the same show.

The presenters of WOW! were Simeon Courtie (previously of CBBC) and Sophie Aldred (a former Doctor Who star). The programme was broadcast from The Maidstone Studios in Maidstone, Kent, also home over the years to shows such as No. 73, Motormouth, and Holly & Stephen's Saturday Showdown. (On one occasion, a power issue in the studio meant that part of the episode was an outside broadcast from the studio car park.) The programme was produced by The Media Merchants in association with Meridian Television for ITV.

The show was a live, anarchic, entertainment magazine similar to Tiswas or Motormouth. It featured imported cartoons, guest interviews and music performances, games and competitions, and comedy. Comic characters featured within the show included the 'Tea Ladies' - played by male actors Peter Cocks and Woody Taylor - supposedly 'interrupting' the show to provide banter and bicker with the guests; and Sidney the Fly (A British Bluebottle), a puppet arachnid voiced by Phil Cornwell.

The show was originally expected to air up until April 1997, however CITV's budget was cut considerably after ITV purchased the rights to Formula 1 motor racing from the BBC. This led to both WOW! and its sister programme The Noise being cancelled after just half a series each, with both shows being brought to an abrupt end before Christmas 1996, and were replaced by the third series of Scratchy & Co. which began airing many months earlier than originally planned.

The following autumn, ITV launched its latest Saturday morning series called Tricky.
