= The Maidstone Studios =

Television studio complex in Kent, England

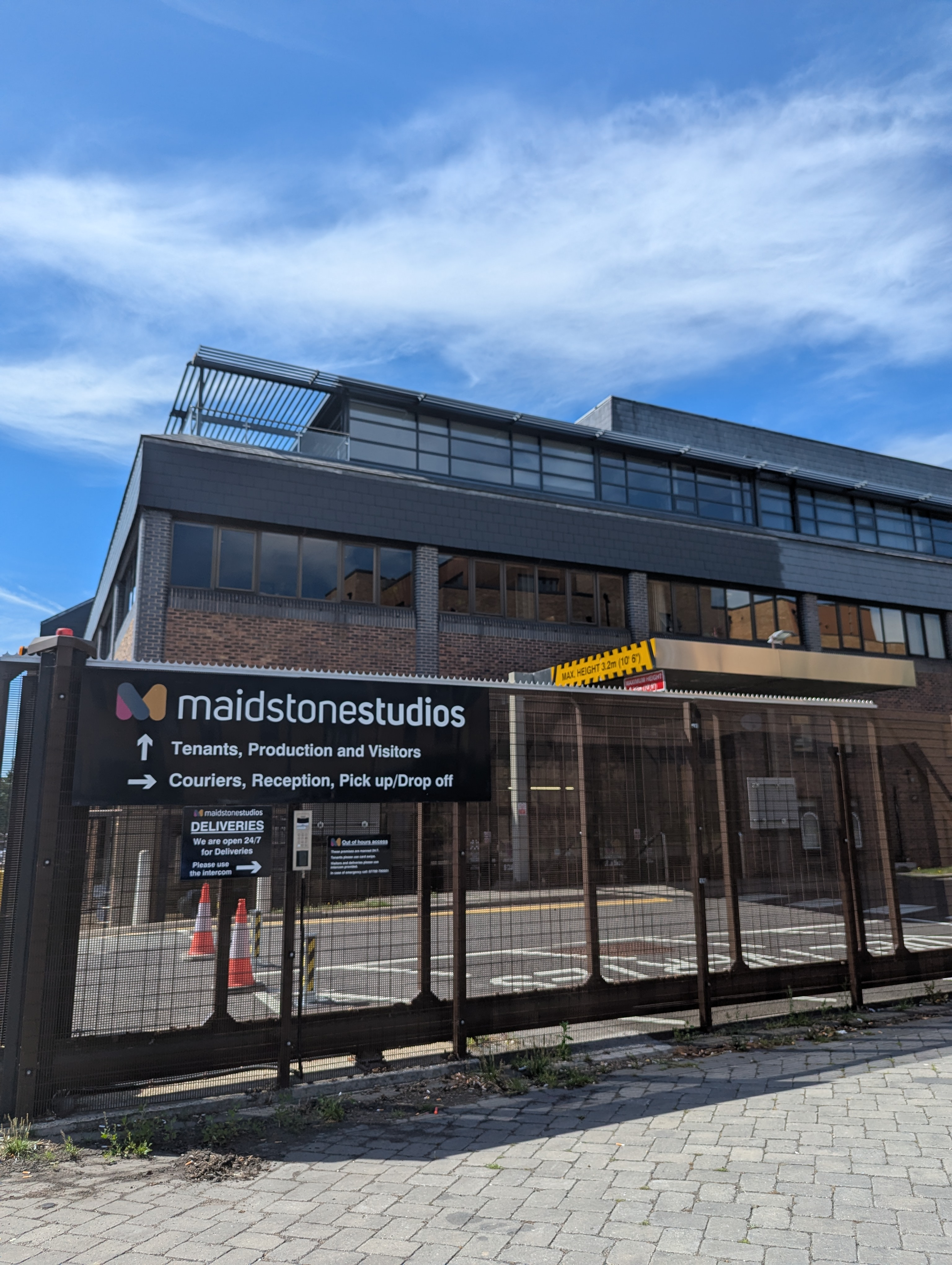
- The current Maidstone Studios
- Former names: TVS Television Centre

General information
- Status: Open
- Type: Television studios
- Location: Vinters Business Park, New Cut Road, Maidstone, Kent, ME14 5NZ, United Kingdom
- Coordinates: 51.280°N 0.5499°E
- Opening: Autumn 1982
- Owner: Maidstone Studios Limited (2002—present)

Other information
- Parking: 350

Website
- The Maidstone Studios

The Maidstone Studios (formerly TVS Television Centre) is the largest independent television studio complex in the United Kingdom, and is based at Vinters Business Park in Maidstone, Kent, England. It has been home to a varied selection of independent British television programming including Later... with Jools Holland, Deal or No Deal, Take Me Out, Catchphrase, as well as popular children's shows such as Art Attack and Let's Play for CBeebies.

The studios has also hosted film productions including Netflix short film The Wonderful Story of Henry Sugar.

Other recent credits also include: Blankety Blank, Family Fortunes and Supermarket Sweep.

== History ==
=== ITV ===
The site was originally chosen by the now defunct ITV company Southern Television in 1979 for a proposed new studio facility should it win the contract from the Independent Broadcasting Authority (the UK television regulator at the time), for the new dual South and South-east of England region in 1981. As Southern Television lost its franchise, it sold the site to the successful applicant Television South (TVS) at a premium. It was part of the agreement with the IBA that TVS needed to provide a separate studio facility for the South East region.

The complex first opened in August 1982, providing broadcasting and production output for TVS. The site was also used as a regional office and a newsgathering hub, broadcasting the South East daily edition of Coast to Coast. TVS continued to use Maidstone until the end of their franchise, which it lost in 1991.

=== Independent ownership ===
When TVS lost its ITV franchise, it retained the Maidstone facility with a view to becoming an independent production company. The new south and south east ITV contractor, Meridian, initially continued to rent space in the building as a production centre for the south east edition of Meridian Tonight, before moving to its own centre at nearby New Hythe between 1994 and 2004. The Meridian newsgathering operation returned to Maidstone Studios in 2004, though the studio for the programme moved to Meridian's new base at Whiteley in Hampshire.

TVS, including the Maidstone Studios, was quickly bought by International Family Entertainment Inc. and the studios were used as an independent production facility. IFE subsequently launched a UK version of The Family Channel based at Maidstone, using some elements of the TVS programme archive. Flextech was a partner in the venture, taking a 39% stake in the business. In 1996, the studio complex was sold by International Family Entertainment to Flextech when it acquired the remaining 61% of the UK Family Channel business.

During 2002 the new owner of Flextech, Telewest Communications, overhauled the structure of the operations which resulted in the disposal of the studios.

The studios were bought in 2002 by a local consortium of businessmen under the name Dovedale Associates for £4.25 million, headed by ex-BBC producer Geoff Miles. In 2005 a £2 million refurbishment programme took place, as part of the new owner's plans for the complex. A new Studio 5 (now known as Studio 1) was opened, which covers 12,000 square feet (1,100 m^{2}) able to accommodate a 2,000-strong audience; it is now the complex's flagship HD studio. Between April 2013 and December 2018 was the home of BBC2's Later... with Jools Holland.

From 2006 to 2012 a company called TVS Television Productions Ltd was based in offices at The Maidstone Studios. The name Television South Ltd, TVS and the colour logo device had been re-registered to lighting cameraman Keith Jacobsen, who traded as an independent production company with no links to the original. The new TVS ceased trading on 9 March 2012, but as of May 2017 the logo and name are used by another independent production company.

The area including car parks and outbuildings to the east of the studio premises were bought by Hillreed Homes. Planning permission was granted in 2014 for 77 dwellings and work to redevelop the site started in 2017. Vehicular access to the studios now passes through the housing estate.

== Studio facilities ==
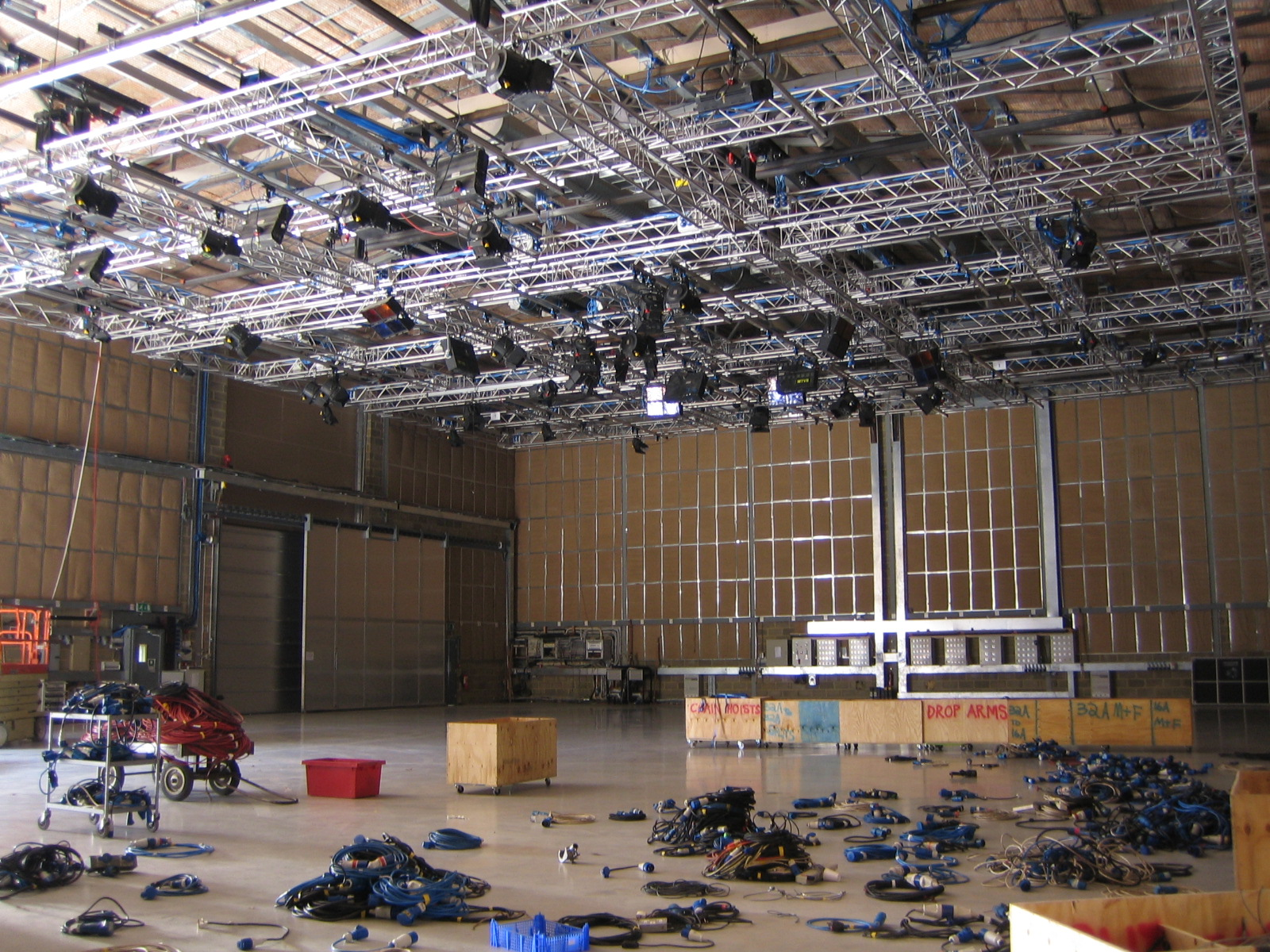
Maidstone Studio 1 is the largest on site at 12,000 sq ft

As of June 2023, The Maidstone Studios operates three studios and a backlot used for outdoor productions and audience holding space.

- Studio 1 – 12,000 square feet (1,100 square metres) – large/huge sets
- Studio 2 – 6,000 square feet (560 square metres) – medium/large size sets
- Studio 3 – 800 square feet (74 square metres) – small size sets

Studio 1 can handle 2,400 standing, 960 seated; Studio 2 can handle 360 seated. Whilst Studio 3 cannot accommodate a seated audience, there is room for a small standing audience. The studios have large production galleries and can operate in 4K or HD. Studio 1 also includes two large scene dock doors to allow easy access for people, scenery and vehicles. Access to Studio 2 is via the studio's scene dock area. Studio 3 is used for small productions and green screen projects.

The studios offer multiple camera solutions including Sony and Grass Valley, multi-functional productions spaces including edit suites, sound & Foley suite, 35 production spaces and an American Diner which is available as a filming location or crew catering space.

On the Maidstone Studios premises is a data centre and office space available for hire.

== Productions ==
- 1 vs. 100 – Endemol for BBC
- Art Attack – TVS, later Media Merchants and STV Productions, for ITV
- Bang on the Money – ITV
- The Basil Brush Show – The Foundation for BBC
- The Biggest Loser (2012 final) - Shine Limited for ITV
- Blankety Blank – Thames for ITV
- Blind Date - Channel 5
- Bradley Walsh's Million Pound Shot- KEO Films for Channel 4
- Cape Wrath – Ecosse Films for Channel 4
- Catchphrase - ITV
- Coalition (film) (2015) – Channel 4
- Dead Line - a 2018 Halloween special of Inside No. 9 - BBC
- Deal or No Deal – ITV1 - Remarkable Entertainment for ITV
- Defectors – Challenge
- Don't Stop Believing – Shine TV/GroupM for Channel 5
- The Door – ITV
- The Genius Game – ITV
- Duel – ITV
- Family Fortunes – Thames for ITV
- FIFA eNations Cup – FIFA / Sky Sports
- Finders Keepers – World Wide International Television and TVS, later STV Productions, for ITV
- Fort Boyard: Ultimate Challenge – The Foundation for ITV and Disney XD (filmed on location in France)
- Fraggle Rock (UK inserts for seasons 3 and 4) – ITV and The Jim Henson Company
- Got to Dance – Sky One
- Guesstimation – Initial for BBC
- Hetty Feather – CBBC
- HOW – ITV / CITV
- I Can See Your Voice - BBC One
- It's a Mystery – Media Merchants and Meridian and ITV
- Jeopardy! - TVS for ITV
- Jo Brand's Great Wall of Comedy – Gold
- Later... with Jools Holland (2013–2018) – BBC Two
- Let's Play – CBeebies
- Ministry of Mayhem – ITV Productions/The Foundation for ITV
- The Mint – ITV
- Mister Maker – The Foundation for CBeebies
- Motormouth - ITV
- No. 73 (Series 3-8 and 7T3) - ITV
- Prove It! – STV Productions/GeronimoTV for ITV
- The Royals – E!
- Scratch 'n' Sniff's Den of Doom (2007) - CITV
- Sort Your Life Out - BBC
- The Split – BBC
- Sport Relief's Top Dog – BBC Two
- Supermarket Sweep – Thames for ITV
- Take Me Out – Talkback Thames for ITV
- This Time with Alan Partridge - Baby Cow Productions for BBC
- Trisha Goddard (2005–2010) – Townhouse TV for Channel 5
- Ultimate Brain – CBBC
- Was It Something I Said? – Channel 4
- What's Up Doc? – TVS, later Scottish Television, for ITV
- Whittle – Channel 5
- The Wonderful Story of Henry Sugar (2023) - released on Netflix
- WOW! – Media Merchants and ITV Meridian, for ITV
- ZZZap! – Media Merchants and ITV Meridian, for ITV

=== Other uses ===
- Between 1998 and 2007, Radio Caroline broadcast from the complex.
- In 2010 Maidstone Studios was used for an anti-speeding TV advert, airing on ITV between 15 January and mid-February.
- Some of the old office space and the 2,000 square feet (190 m^{2}) former Studio 1 have been converted into a data centre offering rack space to local, national and international businesses.
- Since 2010, the University for the Creative Arts has taught television production within the office space and studio space.
