= Exit State =

English rock band

- Origin: Burnley, Lancashire, England
- Genres: Rock, metal, hard rock, alternative rock
- Years active: 2005–2014
- Labels: King Prawn Records; Rocksector Records
- Past members: Roy Bright, Peat Hicks, Philip Ireland, Matt Harris, Lee Walmsley, Sara Leigh, Jason Shuttleworth, Eddie Sims, Graham Storton, Scott Knowles, James Henderson, Adam Stephenson.

Exit State were an English rock band. Formed in 2005 by Roy Bright, they released two EPs and three studio albums.

== History ==
Exit State were a Hard rock band from Burnley, Preston and Rossendale, Lancashire, England. Their cited influences include Foo Fighters, Metallica, Led Zeppelin and The Who. Exit State have been likened to Foo Fighters, Lostprophets and Therapy?

=== Formation (2005–2008) ===
Exit State was formed in 2005 by Roy Bright following the breakup of East Lancashire rock band Deponeye. Deponeye had started to make some advances in the industry during 2004 when two of their songs saw inclusion onto the soundtrack for the racing video game FlatOut and a record deal offer from Revolver Records; however, founder member Roy Bright felt that commitment levels to move Deponeye forward were not shared with the other members and as such the band folded in the summer of 2004. The then three-piece was made up of original members Roy Bright, Sara Leigh and Lee Walmsley, who began writing original compositions in early 2005 and started playing small shows in Burnley and Manchester. Many of the early songs were old Deponeye songs already established.

During the spring of 2006, bass guitarist Walmsley expressed, at a meeting with Bright, the need to move on and leave the band, preferring to play indie rock music as opposed to hard rock. Walmsley was replaced on bass guitar by Bright's close friend Jason Shuttleworth, who was the bass player for Burnley heavy metal band I.C.O.N. This was a temporary fix to honour a number of shows in the East Lancashire area and Manchester.

Shuttleworth was eventually replaced by drummer Leigh's boyfriend Eddie Sims; however, Sims expressed a preference to play guitar so Graham Storton, a bass guitar player known to Bright in the local area, was recruited to be the band's permanent bass player. Shortly after, Leigh announced that she would be moving to London and leaving the band and Sims followed suit at the same time.

This left Bright with many problems to be solved as drummers and guitarists seemed to be in short supply in his local area. Bright approached close friend Adam Stephenson to be the band's permanent guitarist and also asked I.C.O.N's newly appointed drummer, James Henderson, to take care of drumming duties on a temporary basis until a firm replacement could be found. Stephenson was unable to step in immediately so I.C.O.N's guitarist Scott Knowles helped out briefly for one show which was to be the last that Leigh played with the band.

In November 2006, Adam Stephenson officially joined Exit State.

Exit State started to find their footing in the North West of England rock community and a healthy local following began to quickly grow. In the summer of 2007 the band entered a Preston based battle of the bands competition. It was during the run in this competition that it was becoming obvious that drumming duties for both I.C.O.N and Exit State were taking its toll on Henderson and that he needed to be replaced as quickly as possible with a permanent drummer. As chance would have it, East Lancashire classic rock band The Freespirits broke up almost at the same point and Bright quickly swooped in to bag Freespirits drummer Peat Hicks. The band continued in the battle of the bands competition with Hicks to the semi-finals where their participation ended.

It was decided at that time the band would enter the recording studio to begin work on their first EP which would be later titled Anybody Out There. The band travelled to Calder Recording Studios in Mytholmroyd and enlisted the aid of record producer Steve Fenton. Fenton had previously worked with Happy Mondays, T. Rex, John Helliwell and The New Mastersounds.

=== Anybody Out There and Bad Days EPs (2008–2009) ===
The band used 'Anybody out There' to secure more shows up and down the country and also to gain radio exposure. During a show in Leeds February 2008, the band were approached by Fenton as he intended to reform his then moth-balled record label Cone Records with a view to signing the band later in the year once the label was back up and running. The band agreed to look at the offer when the label was up and running should they not have been approached by anyone else.

May 2008 saw the bands 'Anybody Out There' EP receive critical acclaim being described in Rock Sound Magazine issue 109 as "satisfyingly heavy, unexpectedly catchy and unashamedly experimental...Impressive!".

During the summer of 2008 the band were approached by Riverbeat Records offering to sign the band, but this was decided against as the band felt it was not a favourable move. At this time front man Bright had his jaw broken in an unprovoked attack outside a nightclub in Burnley. During the three-month break the band decided to act upon issues surrounding bass player Storton's role in the band and the decision was taken to replace Storton. During this time Producer and now record label boss Steve Fenton approached the band interested in signing them to his now up and running newly named King Prawn Records. Fenton agreed to sit on the contract until a permanent bass player was found.

Late September 2008 Bright, Stephenson and Hicks travelled to Preston to speak with bass player Phil Ireland whom they had come across as he had been playing for various bands in the Preston area. Ireland joined the band the week later and was announced as the new permanent bass player for Exit State in October 2008.

Talks with Fenton resumed and the band received their contract November 2008 and signing to King Prawn Records February 2009. During January 2009, Exit State had returned to Calder Recording Studios once again under the guidance of producer Fenton, as the deal was considered to be secure. They re-recorded all tracks on the Anybody Out There EP to take into account Ireland's new bass lines and influence on the band and re-record Hicks drums as a new and tight understanding by the rhythm section of Hicks and Ireland had quickly developed. Vocals were left untouched with only sparse re-records on the guitars.

30 June 2009 saw the release of Bad Days on King Prawn Records. and the EP received critical acclaim from online reviewers including Manchester Music and Komodo Rock however, they had not seemed to pick up much in the way of reviews from the notable magazines.

=== Death of a Rockstar (2009–2010) ===
Exit State continued to tour heavily in 2009 and gained support slots with ex-Iron Maiden and Wolfsbane front man Blaze Bayley and Witchfynde. The band once again entered the studios of Calder Recordings with producer Steve Fenton in September 2009 to begin work on their first studio album that was to be later titled Death of a Rockstar. The album was completed at The Chairworks Studios, Castleford during Christmas 2009 and was mastered by Ray Staff at AIR Studios London.

During April 2010, Exit State signed their first professional management deal with the management arm of Rocksector Records, which led them to support former AC/DC front man Dave Evans and The Black Spiders. Other support slots included The More I See featuring ex-The Prodigy guitarist Gizz Butt and a tour with The Black Mollys featuring two members of Enuff Z'nuff.

31 May 2010 saw the release of their debut album Death of a Rockstar to much critical acclaim from both online reviewers and UK magazines. Issue 64 of Black Velvet magazine stated "The true joy of this band though is their refusal to conform to stereotypes, combining metal, pop & plain old rock n roll effortlessly & without apologies" whilst in the July 2010 Issue 124 of Big Cheese Magazine, Tom Williams stated "Give these guys a big welcome to the scene; I think they'll be sticking around a while."

However, Rock Sound Magazine seemed to have performed a U-turn on the band with Faye Lewis stating in the July 2010 Issue 137 "unfortunately the bad outweighs the good here and when vocalist Roy Bright sings you just wish he'd stop!". Despite Rock Sound's disapproval, there have been more good reviews than bad, with Circle Pit TV saying "These guys are the real deal and at CIRCLE PIT, we believe that they are going to go on from strength to strength, pushing the envelope and continuing to improve on an already massive sound" and Chinners of Mudkiss Fanzine stating "These guys have put together this stunning solid debut album with some interesting and relevant subject matter which should be heard by many, if they can transfer these songs well within their live performances their future should be very promising."

In June 2010, Exit State announced that they were to be the main support on a full UK tour with former CITV Art Attack presenter Neil Buchanan's Marseille. The tour ran from September to December 2010.

The music video for 'Death of a Rockstars' opening track Lost Beyond Belief began receiving airplay on Kerrang! TV May 2010. the video eventually topped the Kerrang! TV request show chart

=== Signing to Rocksector Records (2011) ===
On 13 July 2011, Exit State announced that they were to leave King Prawn Records and join the ranks of Rocksector Records. According to the announcement the agreement was mutually beneficial between both labels and the band themselves and that "a move to a label with artists like Fury UK, Attica Rage, former AC/DC singer Dave Evans, Falling Red & many more, puts them exactly where they need to be to make the very best of the brilliant things which have happened to the band during the past 12 months". The move however, delayed the initial release of their 2nd album 'Black Veins' album to October 2011.

=== Black Veins (2011) ===
The band have announced that their second studio album entitled Black Veins will be released Monday 3 October 2011. The 12 track album, engineered and produced by Steve Fenton, represents quite a leap in terms of sound quality and development according to Bright and recent reviews seem to point to the band having produced a landmark product for themselves. Don Jackson-Wyatt of Circle Pit Rock and Metal Webzine states "What I will say about the entire album is that Exit State have not only marked their identity and sound on it, but they have paved the way for other bands to follow them for years to come. Previously I have mentioned that they are influenced by certain massive bands, but now it's their turn to influence others and I feel that they are more than capable of doing that." Black Veins also features a guest guitar solo piece on the track 'All For You' by ex-The Prodigy guitarist Gizz Butt.

=== Stephenson leaves (2011) ===
On 19 September 2011, the band announced via their Official Website that long standing lead guitarist Adam Stephenson was to leave the band. The announcement cites that due to increasing personal and ordinary day-to-day commitments Stephenson could no longer balance his time with that required for the workload involved with the recording and touring commitments of the band. The announcement went on to say "with the warmest of memories his important contribution to Exit State as a whole since the band's earliest days will not be forgotten." Ollie Cordwell from labelmates Fantasist, was appointed the role of temporary lead guitarist for the band to see out the remaining shows of 2011 whilst the search for a permanent replacement got underway.

=== Matt Harris joins (2012) ===
On 26 January 2012 Exit State announced they had found a replacement guitarist for recently departed, long standing member Adam Stephenson. Harris states his influences as wide-ranging as Led Zeppelin, The Beatles, Mozart, Opeth, Alice in Chains and Black Sabbath. Now aged 26, he started playing guitar at 14 and is principally self-taught. He has played in a variety of styles over the years, with his main previous project being metal band Wheels Of Confusion who eventually disbanded after making a mark on the North Manchester/Lancashire scene. Frontman Roy Bright went on to say "It’s been a massive decision for us to confirm the right guy and was always something we were prepared to take our time over. We’ve had the benefit of seeing Matt perform with the band several times now & also getting to know him behind the scenes and it’s fantastic for us all that the position is resolved. Matt’s an experienced & real guitarist, capable of mixing classic playing with a modern feel and that’s exactly what we wanted in Exit State"

=== Tour with Michael Schenker (2012) ===
Exit State announced that in May 2012 they are to tour the UK with Michael Schenker. The shows are at Wolverhampton, Manchester, Glasgow and London and are made all more special as former Scorpions drummer Herman Rarebell and early Scorpions bassist Francis Buchholz are included in Michael Schenker's band for this tour.

=== Let's See It All (2013) ===
The band announced in February 2013, via their official website, that their third studio album, Let's See It All, will be released 24 June 2013. Their official statement added, "Out of the box jumps as fresh, punchy, catchy, shining an example of modern rock as anyone could realistically expect. The new album contains skilled compositions, polished performances and enviable production. "Let's See It All" is to be released on 24 June 2013 – and Exit State comes-of-age."

=== Patrons for chARTUK ===
In February 2013, Exit State was immensely proud to be appointed Official Patron of chART – Children's Hospice Arts, a charity that aims to enrich the lives of children with life limiting conditions and severe disabilities through music and the arts.

=== Family connection ===
Front man Roy Bright has a half-brother the ex-Premier League Footballer Mark Bright, now a regular BBC Sports commentator for Match of the Day.

== Members ==
=== Current ===
- Roy Bright – vocals, guitar
- Philip Ireland – bass, backing vocals
- Peat Hicks – drums, backing vocals
- Matt Harris – guitar

=== Past ===
- Lee Walmsley – bass
- Sara Leigh – drums, backing vocals
- Jason Shuttleworth – bass
- Eddie Sims – bass, guitar
- Graham Storton – bass, backing vocals
- Scott Knowles – guitar
- James Henderson – drums
- Adam Stephenson – guitar

== Discography ==
=== Albums ===
Year	Release details
2010	Death of a Rockstar: Release: 31 May 2010; Label: King Prawn Records; Formats: CD, digital download
2011	Black Veins: Release: 3 October 2011; Label: Rocksector Records; Formats: CD, digital download
2013	Let's See It All: Release: 24 June 2013; Label: Rocksector Records; Formats: CD, digital download

=== EP's ===
Year	Release details
2008	Anybody Out There: Release: Jan 2008; Label: Self-Released; Formats: CD
2009	Bad Days: Release: 29 June 2009; Label: King Prawn Records; Formats: CD, digital download
