= Finders Keepers (American game show) =

Children's game show

- Intro title for Finders Keepers.
- Genre: Game show Game of dares
- Created by: Geoffrey Darby; Bonni Grossberg; Michael Klinghoffer; Neil Krupnick; Dee LaDuke
- Based on: Lost objects being found
- Written by: Alan Silberberg
- Directed by: Dana Calderwood
- Presented by: Wesley Eure (Nickelodeon); Larry Toffler (Syndication)
- Announcer: John Harvey; Bob Lorman; Joe Conklin; Harry Stevens
- Theme music composer: Edd Kalehoff
- Country of origin: United States
- Original language: English
- No. of seasons: 2
- No. of episodes: 195 (Nickelodeon: 130; syndication: 65)

Production
- Executive producer: Geoffrey Darby
- Producer: Michael Klinghoffer
- Production locations: Philadelphia, Pennsylvania (first two seasons); Los Angeles, California (syndication)
- Camera setup: MIichael Cabana; Aldo Farnese; Bill Santoro; Dave Schwartz
- Running time: 30 minutes (including commercials)
- Production company: Fox Television Stations (season 2)

Original release
- Network: Nickelodeon (1987–88); Syndicated (1988–89)
- Release: November 2, 1987 – March 10, 1989

Related
- The Noise

Finders Keepers is an American children's game show that debuted on Nickelodeon in 1987 and later aired in first-run syndication starting in 1988. The show featured two teams of two children attempting to find hidden objects in different rooms of a house.

The Nickelodeon version premiered on November 2, 1987, and was hosted by Wesley Eure. Following this version's cancellation, Larry Toffler hosted a syndicated version that premiered on September 12, 1988.

== Gameplay ==
=== Main Game ===
The main game was played in two rounds, each with two halves. The first half of each round involved finding hidden pictures in a complex drawing, and the second half involved ransacking rooms in a large house built on-stage.

==== Hidden Pictures round ====
In the first half of each round, the object for the teams was to find hidden pictures drawn into a larger picture. The host read a clue, and the first team to buzz in was given a chance to find the correct object. If they failed to do so, the opposing team was given a chance to find it and steal the money.

On the Nickelodeon series, the picture was displayed on a telestrator and the teams used light pens to circle the objects on monitors set into their podiums. On the syndicated series, the picture was displayed on a large board and each team was given a set of plastic laminate stickers similar to Colorforms representing the objects. When a team buzzed in, one member had to run to the board, grab the sticker for the correct object in their color, and stick it onto the picture in the appropriate place while their partner called out advice.

Each correct item located earned $25 for the team and an opportunity to search one of four rooms in the house for that round. During the first half of the Nickelodeon series the players chose the rooms they wanted to search, but this was later changed so that each hidden object found awarded the opportunity to search a specific room.

Each picture had a maximum of six objects hidden within it. In the first half of the Nickelodeon series, an incorrect answer meant a room would go unclaimed. For the subsequent episodes and syndicated series, the round was played until all four rooms were claimed or all six clues were played, whichever came first.

==== Searching the house ====
The house consisted of eight rooms that could be whimsical versions of traditional rooms in a typical home (e.g., a living room, a bathroom, a den or a kitchen), or complete fantasy rooms, such as "Sherlock's Study," "Ali-Baba's bathroom", a sewer (which contained a pool of water), Tarzan's tree house, a pastry shop, or "Frankenstein's laboratory." The house was laid out with two floors of four rooms each, and a staircase ran up the middle.

In each room, the host read a clue describing an object hidden within. The team had 30 seconds to find the object, and were given one chance to show it to the host once found. If they found the item, the team won $50. If they could not, or if the object they presented was not the right one, the money went to the other team. On the Nickelodeon version, while the team was trying to find the item associated with the clue, the camera would discreetly zoom in on it. On the syndicated version, a picture of the room would appear at the bottom of the screen with the target object marked by a flashing X.

Rooms were frequently set up with distractions to hinder the teams' searches, such as ping-pong balls falling onto them from cabinets or the ceiling, sprays of water or confetti, and (in later episodes) entire shelves collapsing. However, any breakable or collapsible objects were fabricated in such a way as to prevent any injuries to the host or contestants, such as plates made from clay that had not been hardened by firing in a kiln.

==== Round two ====
Two teams playing the hidden picture round on the syndicated series (note the laminate stickers on the boards)

The process repeated with a second hidden pictures round and set of rooms to search. The dollar values increased to $75 for finding a correct hidden picture and $100 for successfully finding a hidden object in a room.

One of the rooms in round two was secretly designated as the day's "Instant Prize Room." If a team won control of this room and found its hidden object, both members won a bonus prize that was theirs to keep regardless of the outcome of the game.

The team with the most money at the end of this round won the game and advanced to the Room to Room Romp. Both teams kept all money earned, the losing team receiving consolation prizes.

==== Tiebreaker ====
If the scores were tied at the end of the second round, a shortened Hidden Pictures round was played as a tiebreaker. The first team to find two pictures won the game.

=== Room-to-Room Romp ===
In the Room-to-Room Romp, the winning team had 90 seconds to find a hidden object in each of six rooms, in a sequence given to them before the round began. All six objects had tags attached, with each of the first five tags directing them to the next room and giving a clue for the object hidden there. The clock began to run after the host finished reading the first clue, and continued to count down while the team moved from one room to another.

The team won a prize for each object found, increasing in value to a grand prize for getting through all six rooms within the time limit.

== Broadcast history ==
The original version premiered on Nickelodeon on November 2, 1987, with Wesley Eure as host and John Harvey as the announcer. Harvey was later replaced by Bob Lorman and then by Joe Conklin. New episodes continued to air on Nickelodeon until July 29, 1988.

A first-run syndicated version, distributed by Fox Television Stations and Viacom premiered on September 12, 1988, and was hosted by Larry Toffler with Harry Stevens announcing. The syndicated series ended its run on March 10, 1989, and began airing in repeats on Nickelodeon the following Monday (March 13), which continued until August 25, 1990. Nick GAS re-aired the series from 1999 until 2006. The all-time winningest pair of contestants (during the syndicated version run) was Gina and Kevin (1988), who recorded a score of $975 to $25. The all-time fastest successful completion of the Room Romp (either Nickelodeon or syndicated) was accomplished by Chris and Michelle (1988), who completed the Romp in 48 seconds.

A Brazilian version of Finders Keepers, called "Bobeou Dançou", aired on TV Globo from July to December 1989. This version was hosted by Brazilian star Xuxa.

A British version of Finders Keepers aired on the CITV block of ITV from 1991 to 1996, followed by a brief revival in 2006. The first five series of this version was presented by Neil Buchanan, who was joined in the last series by Diane Youdale. Jeff Brazier presented the revival.

=== Production information ===
The music for Finders Keepers was written by Edd Kalehoff. The music package was updated when the show went into syndication.

The Nickelodeon version of Finders Keepers was taped at WHYY-TV in Philadelphia, Pennsylvania (as was Double Dare), while the syndicated version was taped at Hollywood Center Studios in Los Angeles, California. The sets of the Nickelodeon and syndicated versions differed slightly. The set of the Nickelodeon version consisted of a mock exterior of a house that included a door through which Eure entered at the beginning of the show. Prior to searching the house, the set would break away to reveal the house and rooms the teams would be searching. On the syndicated version, the play area and house shared the same set, with the house built stage left and the play area stage right.

Converse was a major sponsor of the show during its run, and every contestant and stage crew member (including the host) wore a pair of the company's shoes.
