= It's a Mystery (disambiguation) =

It's a Mystery may refer to:

- It's a Mystery (album), a 1995 album by Bob Seger
- It's a Mystery (TV series), a 1996–2002 UK TV series
- "It's a Mystery" (song), a 1981 song by Toyah
- "It's a Mystery", a 2000 song by Stratovarius from the album Infinite

== See also ==
- It's a Mystery, Charlie Brown, a 1974 TV special, based on comic-strip Peanuts, that aired on CBS
- It's a Mystery, Charlie Brown (soundtrack), soundtrack album from 1974 TV special
