= Jassa Ahluwalia =

British actor and presenter

- Born: Jassa Singh Ahluwalia; 12 September 1990 (age 35); Coventry, England
- Occupations: Actor and presenter
- Years active: 2011–present
- Website: www.jassaahluwalia.com

Jassa Singh Ahluwalia (born 12 September 1990) is a British actor, director and radio presenter. He acted in the BBC television series Some Girls, the film The Whale and presented the Disney Junior TV show Art Attack.

== Early life ==
Ahluwalia was born in Coventry, England. He is of British and Indian descent, and speaks fluent Punjabi. His grandfather was the architect James A Roberts, and his sister Ramanique also acts.

Ahluwalia grew up in Oadby, Leicester, where he attended Launde Primary School, and later Beauchamp College, where he achieved 10 A* grades at GCSE and straight As at A Level (at a time when an A* grade was not available at A level). While at school, he had a number of small roles, including a speaking role in the film My Angel. Aged 19, he attained a place on the Prime Minister's Global Fellowship programme, spending six weeks in China. He later attended University College London for one year, studying Spanish and Russian, before dropping out to pursue a television career.

== Career ==
In 2010, Ahluwalia got his big break when he successfully auditioned for the role of host in the children's television series Art Attack. He presented the show for one series in 2011, filming in Argentina, before being replaced by Lloyd Warbey.

In 2011, Ahluwalia began work on his debut music album All Your Letters.

Ahluwalia's next big break was securing the recurring part of lovable badboy Rocky in BBC Three's Some Girls. He was the love interest of the main character Viva (Adelayo Adedayo). He appeared in 12 episodes in the shows run from 2012 to 2014.

A role in BBC One's Casualty was next, as he performed in an episode entitled "Seeing in the Dark", which aired on 27 October 2012. Ahluwalia had a small part in The Bible, where he played young David, slayer of Goliath. Filmed in Morocco, this miniseries screened on the History Channel in 2013.

Perhaps his best received performance to date was an appearance in the BBC drama Ripper Street, in which he played Vincent Featherwell, a gay prostitute posing as a telegraph boy, in the episode "Threads of Silk and Gold", which was the fifth episode of the second series.

Ahluwalia featured again on BBC One in December 2013, in the film The Whale which tells the true story of the sinking of the whaleship Essex. He plays Owen Coffin, one of the sailors and a cousin of the ship's captain, George Pollard, Jr.

In 2013, Ahluwalia produced a short film entitled Modern Man with director Sebastian Solberg. The film tells the story of an accidental time-travelling cave-woman and her chance encounter with Rupert on the day he plans to propose to his girlfriend.

He has also filmed an as yet unreleased project for NBC Universal.

Ahluwalia has presented programmes on the BBC Asian Network.

== Filmography ==
Television
Year	Title	Role
2011	Art Attack	Himself
2012	Casualty	Bart Nowak
2013	The Bible	Young David
2012–2014	Some Girls	Rocky
2013	Ripper Street	Vincent Featherwell
2015–2021	Unforgotten	Adam Stuart
2016	Peaky Blinders	Dimitri

Film
Year	Title	Role
2011	My Angel	Phil
2011	Resistance	Russian Partisan
2013	El amor y otras desgracias	Mark
2013	The Whale	Owen Coffin
2015	Dragonheart 3: The Sorcerer's Curse	Lorne
2015	The Rezort	Jack
2018	Slaughterhouse Rulez	Yuri
