= Motormouth =

British children's television series (1988–1992)

- Genre: Children's entertainment
- Presented by: Neil Buchanan; Tony Gregory; Julian Ballantyne; Caroline Hanson; Andrea Arnold; Gaby Roslin; Steve Johnson; Andy Crane
- Country of origin: United Kingdom
- Original language: English
- No. of series: 4
- No. of episodes: 150

Production
- Production location: The Maidstone Studios
- Production company: TVS

Original release
- Network: ITV
- Release: 3 September 1988 – 4 April 1992

Motormouth was a Saturday morning children's entertainment series that was produced by TVS and broadcast across the ITV network for four series, running between 3 September 1988 and 4 April 1992. Each series generally ran from the autumn of one year to the spring of the next, as was common among many 'main' Saturday morning series.

The programme was launched following the decision to axe No. 73, which had run in the same slot until early 1988. No. 73 had been revamped during its final series as 7T3, with a partially exterior set. However, the new 7T3 set-up was expensive and difficult to produce, and so it was decided to switch to a fully studio-based set-up. The new show was produced at the same studio complex (The Maidstone Studios) as its predecessor, and many of the production team (and several presenters) transferred to the new show. Whereas No. 73 had included an inherent narrative storyline, the decision was taken that Motormouth would have a straightforward magazine presentation format.

The studio set for the first series was dominated by several giant inflatable elements, including a giant motorised mouth, from which the show took its name. In the second series, billed in some cases as Motormouth II or Motormouth 2, there were changes, including the introduction of new graphics and set elements based on cogs and sprockets. The use of the giant mouth declined following this alteration.

The show's third series - which boasted new graphics and remixed theme music, and was for a brief time billed as All New Motormouth - also had a new, predominantly white set; the giant mouth was removed altogether at this point, along with all other remaining inflatables. This series saw the introduction of a diner-style set (sometimes referred to as 'The Motormouth Cafe') which saw guests and audience members sitting at tables. This format and styling was left largely intact for the fourth series.

== Presenters ==
Cast of the first series: Tony Gregory, Caroline Hanson, Neil Buchanan, Julian Ballantyne and Andrea Arnold

The first series was presented by a five-strong lineup of hosts, two of whom had previously appeared on No. 73. Neil Buchanan and Andrea Arnold were joined by new recruits Caroline Hanson, Tony Gregory and Julian Ballantyne.

For the second series, Andrea Arnold ceased to be a main presenter and instead filed location reports from sites around the world which were broadcast into the programme. Hanson and Ballantyne departed the programme, replaced by Gaby Roslin and Steve Johnson. Buchanan and Gregory remained. Generally Buchanan, Gregory and Roslin would present the studio elements with Johnson hosting the gameshow inserts It's Torture, Gunge 'em in the Dungeon and Mouse Trap (based upon the board game of the same name).

By the third series, Andrea Arnold had left the programme entirely, with Tony Gregory also departing, replaced by former Children's BBC presenter Andy Crane. Crane, Buchanan, Roslin and Johnson remained as presenters until the end of the show's run.

== Fictional elements ==
The first series' episodes included Spin-off, a soap opera parody set behind the scenes of the programme. The cast of Spin-off included Richard Waites, who had previously appeared in the final series of No. 73/7T3. Spin-off was dropped after the first series.

A similar fictional production storyline was reintroduced in the programme's fourth series (though the Spin-off title was not revived). Instead of being separated from the main programme, the comedy-drama element was woven into the main programme, with characters from the fictional production team mingling with hosts and guests to create a more flowing storyline. The cast of this element was completely different from that of Spin-off and included Carla Mendonça, who played Juliet Nichols, and Cal McCrystal, who played Max Church. The wedding between Juliet and Max formed the backbone storyline in the final edition of the series.

The programme also included imported cartoons as inserted content; cartoons which were featured during the programme's run included She-Ra: Princess of Power, Samurai Pizza Cats, The Real Ghostbusters and Scooby-Doo.

== Cancellation and replacement ==
During the 1991/1992 series, TVS, the company that made the programme, was notified they had lost their ITV franchise and would cease broadcasting at the end of 1992. At the time, the future of TVS was unclear; it was decided to end Motormouth altogether, and the final show closed with a sign-off from the presenters, including Neil Buchanan, who had fronted all four series.

Scottish Television (STV) took over arrangements for winter Saturday mornings when J. Nigel Pickard transferred to STV from TVS. TVS entered into an agreement with STV and Warner Bros. to create a new show, What's Up Doc?, like Motormouth, also broadcast from the Maidstone Studios. STV took over the broadcast responsibilities of the series from TVS to ITV from January 1993. Andy Crane transferred from Motormouth to the new show and Cal McCrystal was kept as a regular guest. They were joined by Yvette Fielding and Pat Sharp.

== Post-Motormouth ==
Steve Johnson went on to host a Halloween-themed CITV gameshow, Terror Towers, from 1994 to 1996.

Gaby Roslin's next role after Motormouth came in September 1992 when she and Chris Evans launched The Big Breakfast on Channel 4. She has since presented City Hospital, Children in Need and The Terry & Gaby Show amongst others.

Andy Crane remained with What's Up Doc? for its three-year run. He also co-presented the CITV computer game review programme Bad Influence! from 1992 to 1995. He presented news programming for Manchester-based Channel M until the axe on 19 March 2010.

Andrea Arnold moved into film-making, winning an Oscar in 2004 and a BAFTA in 2007.

Cal McCrystal is a comedy director whose credits include One Man, Two Guvnors.

Tony Gregory is a TV director whose credits include Big Brother.

Neil Buchanan remained with CITV until 2007, producing shows through his company The Media Merchants and hosting Finders Keepers and Art Attack.

Caroline Hanson left to present a film show for Super Channel and then the first series of Rough Guide to Careers for BBC2, before becoming a producer/director on the daily Movie Show for BSB. After BSB was merged with Sky, she left to work in special events, before forming her own PR company (Caroline Collett PR) in the early 1990s.

The Maidstone Studios have since been used as a production base for other Saturday morning programmes including Ministry of Mayhem and Basil's Swap Shop.

Motormouth was repeated on The Family Channel in 1994 and 1995 as The Best of Motormouth presented by Andy Crane and incorporated highlights from the fourth and final series. When Challenge TV launched in February 1997, it was shown on the overnight programming strand Family Late airing at 4:00am at the weekends for a brief period in the Summer of 1998.

According to the Kaleidoscope TV Brain website, most of the series has been wiped from the archives; some editions from series 3 and 4 (again in edited form) have appeared on YouTube, but even in these cases off-air recordings are regarded as the only existing copies.

== Series guide ==
- Series 1: 58 editions (Saturdays/Sundays) - 3 September 1988 – 26 March 1989
- Series 2: 31 editions - 9 September 1989 – 14 April 1990
- Series 3: 31 editions - 1 September 1990 – 30 March 1991
- Series 4: 32 editions - 31 August 1991 – 4 April 1992
