= Nigel Pickard =

British television executive

Nigel Pickard is a British television executive who oversaw the creation and launch of, amongst others, the BBC's children's channels, CBBC and CBeebies and as director of programmes at ITV, was responsible for commissioning some of the UK's most popular shows. He also worked for Zodiak Media, one of the largest independent producers in the world and is currently a Director of Nevision.

== Career ==
Pickard started his career in the early 1970s, as a film editor and then as a floor manager, working on Thames Television's Armchair Thriller and the children's series Worzel Gummidge for Southern Television. In 1981, he was made a director and worked on How and Runaround. In 1982, Pickard became a senior programme director of the children's department at the newly formed TVS, where his work included No73 and Art Attack. In 1986, he was appointed Controller of Children's and Family.

When TVS lost its ITV contract, he moved to Scottish TV to be controller of entertainment and drama features.

In 1994, he became Director of Programmes, and subsequently, General Manager, of The Family Channel in the UK, and he was at the forefront of the growth of multi-channel television in Britain. As Vice President, Production for Flextech he steered the development and launch of Challenge in 1997 and was responsible for all original production for the bouquet of Flextech channels including TCC, Bravo, Trouble, Living and Challenge.

Pickard joined ITV in 1998 as Controller of Children's and Youth Programmes, and was responsible for programme commissions, acquisitions and the schedule of CITV, developing the on-air brand, as well as the CITV website and channel.

In 2000, he was appointed Controller of BBC Children's. As well as commissioning and scheduling, he was responsible for overseeing the creation and launch of the two digital channels CBeebies and the CBBC Channel, which went on the air in February 2002.

He returned to ITV in February 2003 as Director of Programmes, the most senior position at the broadcaster, where he was responsible for the scheduling and commissioning of the entire ITV output including The X Factor, Britain's Got Talent, Dancing On Ice, Doc Martin, Wild At Heart, Parkinson, and Primeval amongst others.

After 3 successful years at ITV, Pickard joined RDF Media as Group Director of Kids, Family Entertainment and Drama in 2006. At RDF, he oversaw commissions such as the CBeebies landmark series, Waybuloo, Mister Maker, Zack and Quack, Escape from Scorpion Island, Dani's House and Floogals.

When RDF Media was acquired by Zodiak in 2010, Pickard was appointed CEO of Zodiak Middle East, Asia and Australasia (overseeing group companies in the region) and CEO UK Kids and Family. He was also chairman of the group's key creative committee, the International Entertainment Board.

Pickard announced he was leaving Zodiak in 2014, and re-joined David Frank and Matthew Frank at their new venture Dial Square 86 in November 2014, as a company director. Dial Square 86 is a next-generation content group that launched in October 2014 announcing the acquisition of Red Hare Digital - a YouTube talent management agency working with fashion & beauty bloggers - and the intention of investing in and acquiring other companies that create, enhance and exploit content online and on TV.

In June 2015, Dial Square 86 announced the creation of The RightsXchange (TRX), an online marketplace for TV rights. Pickard was announced as President of the new venture.
