= Ben Jones (DJ) =

English radio DJ

- Born: Ben Jones; Bournemouth, Dorset, England
- Occupations: Radio DJ, Broadcaster; Television presenter
- Years active: 1997–present

Ben Jones is an English radio DJ and former children's television presenter.

== Early career ==
Jones was born in Bournemouth, Dorset. He grew up in the New Forest and now lives in Wandsworth, west London. His first steps into the radio industry were as teaboy and Broadcast Assistant on local radio stations such as 2CR and Power FM.

In 1997, he spent time as a DJ at the Capital Radio Cafe in 1997. During this time, he was mentored by Chris Tarrant, a man Jones professes to admire the most, "because of his longevity, consistency and talent". Under the management of programme director Paul Jackson, and the connections with Tarrant, soon Jones broke into television as he had desired. As a child, he had been inspired by children's radio star Andy Crane and sought to be a presenter himself. He soon became a presenter on the British version on The Disney Channel in 1998, presenting the station's first-ever breakfast show and a live interactive show. From 1999 he worked as a presenter for CITV, fronting programmes such as The Top Ten of Everything, It's a Mystery and CITV Afternoons along with other presenters such as Stephen Mulhern and Danielle Nicholls.

== Virgin/Absolute Radio ==
After a brief spell at Fire Radio in Bournemouth, in 2001 he joined Virgin Radio (now Absolute Radio), initially working in late night or overnight spots. In 2004 he became the host of the Most Wanted show, but in late 2006, he was allocated the Virgin Radio Drivetime show, an afternoon/early evening show at one of the peak listening times of the day. However, he worked in many slots on the radio station at various times of the day and week, often filling in for missing DJs. Jones has presented a wide variety of shows, including Afternoons, Virgin Superstars, Most Wanted, Virgin radio drive-time, Album Chart, Sunday Night Live 7-10pm. From July 2007, Jones returned to primarily host the Most Wanted show.

In late October and early November 2008, Jones co-presented The Christian O'Connell Breakfast Show whilst O'Connell was on leave. At that point, Virgin underwent a change of ownership and was renamed Absolute Radio, and announced the launch of four new weekly shows, The 90s hour, the album hour, the classic artist hour and The A-Z hour. All of these were hosted by Jones. Jones also presented on DAB Digital sister station Absolute 80s weekdays from 1 pm to 5 pm. Jones also co-presented the weekly Absolute Radio Movies Extra Podcast with Adrian Hieatt. His former evening show was broadcast just after Geoff Lloyd's Hometime Show between 8–11 pm.

On 9 May 2011, it was confirmed that Jones would leave Absolute Radio and Absolute 80s at the end of July 2011 to pursue new projects. He presented his last show on Absolute Radio on Friday 29 July 2011.

When Virgin Radio relaunched in the UK on 30 March 2016, this time under ownership of Wireless Group, Jones joined the weekend presenting line-up. Initially he presented on Saturdays from 1-4pm before moving to Fridays 7-11pm. He began to also present Saturdays 7-11pm from 8 July 2017.

== Accolades ==
Jones won a Bronze Sony Award in 2003 for Virgin Superstars, and interviewed Mick Jagger, David Bowie, Coldplay, Robbie Williams, Slash, Ozzy Osbourne, the Red Hot Chili Peppers and Ronnie Wood. On 22 October 2008, Jones interviewed Australian rock stars, singer Brian Johnson and guitarist Angus Young of AC/DC.
