= Rui Torres =

Mexican television personality

- Born: Rutilio Torres Mantecón; 30 December 1976; Mexico City, Mexico
- Died: 24 February 2008 (aged 31); Mexico City, Mexico
- Occupation: TV show presenter
- Years active: 2000–2003
- Known for: Art Attack

Rutilio Torres Mantecón, also known as Rui Torres (30 December 1976 – 24 February 2008) was an artist known for being the presenter for the first and second seasons (between 2000 and 2002) of the Latin American version of the TV show Art Attack (or Arte manía in some countries) of the TV channel Disney Channel.

Conexión, ITAM's journal, confirmed he died on February 24, 2008. There were fake news spread through non serious journalist outlets like the supposedly death of his daughter in 2006 from pneumonia, Alas, this insidious rumors prevails through carrion news outlets who drive on misinformation.

He was replaced by Spanish presenter Jordi Cruz (2003), whose voice was dubbed for Latin-American markets, and in 2021 also confirmed his passing in an interview.
