= Death of a Rockstar =

Studio album by Exit State
- Released: May 31, 2010
- Genres: Rock, metal, hard rock, alternative rock
- Length: 34 mins
- Label: King Prawn Records
- Producer: Steve Fenton

Exit State chronology
Bad Days (2009)	Death of a Rockstar (2010)	Black Veins (2011)

Singles from Death of a Rockstar
- 1. "Bad Days" Released: 29.06.09; 2. "Lost Beyond Belief" Released: 12.04.10

Professional ratings
Review scores
Source	Rating
Mudkiss Fanzine	(Positive)
DSD	7/10 stars
Glitzine	10/10 stars
Room Thirteen	11/13 stars

Death of a Rockstar is the debut album by rock band Exit State. It was released on May 31, 2010, and features the singles "Bad Days" and "Lost Beyond Belief".

== Track list ==
All lyrics written by Roy Bright. All songs written by Roy Bright, Adam Stephenson, Peat Hicks, and Philip Ireland except:

- "Out till 3" - Roy Bright/Justin Beswick
- "Death of a Rockstar Part 2" - Roy Bright, Adam Stephenson, Peat Hicks, and Eddie Sims
- "Bad Days" - Roy Bright, Adam Stephenson, Peat Hicks, and James Henderson
- "And She Said" - Roy Bright, Adam Stepheson, and Peat Hicks

No.	Title	Length
1.	"Lost Beyond Belief"	3:51
2.	"Out till 3"	2:53
3.	"Dominates Me"	3:33
4.	"Death of a Rockstar Part 1"	1:45
5.	"Death of a Rockstar Part 2"	5:38
6.	"Bad Days"	3:48
7.	"Dirty Intoxicated"	3:08
8.	"I Know Where You Are"	4:42
9.	"And She Said"	5:25

== Personnel ==
Exit State

- Roy Bright – vocals, guitars
- Adam Stephenson – guitars
- Philip Ireland – bass, backing vocals
- Peat Hicks – drums, backing vocals

Other contributors

- Steve Fenton – production and mixing
- Steve Gligorovic, Michael Gounelas, and James Mottershead – studio engineers
- Roy Bright, Peat Hicks, and Steve Fenton – additional string arrangements
- Laura Hurd and Jordan Molyneuax – backing vocals
- Ray Staff – mastering
- James Tunnacliffe – cover photography
- Ash Goldie – individual item photographs
- Mark Appleton – management
