= Marseille (band) =

British heavy metal band

- Marseille performing in 2011 (left to right): Neil Buchanan, Nigel Roberts, Andy Charters

Background information
- Origin: Liverpool, England
- Genres: Heavy metal
- Years active: 1976–1984; 2008–2014; 2017–2019
- Labels: Mountain; RCA; Ultranoise; Gas Station Music
- Past members: Neil Buchanan; Nige Roberts; Gareth Webb; Lee Andrews; Paul Dale; Keith Knowles; Steve Dinwoodie; Sav Pearce; Marc Railton; Mark Hay; Andy Charters; Darren Daz Green

Marseille were a British heavy metal band from Liverpool, England, formed in 1976 by Neil Buchanan, Andy Charters and Keith Knowles. Marseille were the first band to win the "UK Battle of the Bands" competition at Wembley Arena in 1977.

== History ==
Marseille were formed in Liverpool, England in early 1976. Original members were Paul Dale (vocals), Neil Buchanan (lead guitar), Andy Charters (second guitar), Keith Knowles (drums) and Steve Dinwoodie (bass). The band were originally called AC/DC: during the time that the Australian rock band of the same name was gaining success in the UK, forcing the band to change their name in mid-1976 to "Marseille".

Marseille won the first ever "UK Battle of the Bands" with the finals judged by Brian May and Roger Taylor of Queen at Wembley Arena on October 31, 1977. This led the band to secure a five-year recording contract with Mountain Records in late 1977, and the band released their debut album, Red, White and Slightly Blue in 1978, which included the songs "The French Way" and "Can Can". Marseille became the first band in the new wave of British heavy metal to play at a big festival in Europe: the Bilzen Festival in Belgium, supporting American rock band Cheap Trick.

Marseille gathered a small fan base while promoting their first album as support for other groups such as Judas Priest, Nazareth, Whitesnake and UFO. Keith Knowles stated: "I was the drummer on all albums and an original member of Marseille. We took the name because 'Marseille' was a French rough seaport like Liverpool and to be honest we were struggling to rename ourselves as we were originally called AC/DC but had to change for obvious reasons. All tracks on this album were recorded 'live' so what you hear is not manufactured in any way. We all have great memories of touring with UFO who were absolutely brilliant with us and made sure we had sound-checks every night. Phil Mogg and Pete Way were like a double act and such great blokes... to stand in the wings listening to Schenker's lead break on Love to Love will live with me forever... and what a nice person he was." Their debut album contained very raunchy lyrics but suffered somewhat from lack of promotion and limitation of release. The single "Kiss Like Rock 'n' Roll" was produced by Nazareth guitarist Manny Charlton.

Their second album release, the eponymous Marseille, received radio airplay, extending their fanbase in the UK. Several tracks from the album featured on the "Alternative Top 20 Charts" published in Sounds magazine with other emerging new wave of British heavy metal bands such as Saxon, Def Leppard and Iron Maiden. Marseille were the first NWOBHM band to tour and have an album released in the United States through RCA Records. The band promoted their Marseille album on tour in the US with Nazareth and American south coast boogie band Blackfoot during the summer of 1980. The band arrived back in the UK to witness the demise of Mountain, their record and management company. With all their equipment still stranded in the US, the band were forced off the road and into a two-year legal battle with liquidators, which precluded them pursuing another recording contract. During this time, Paul Dale, Andy Charters and Neil Buchanan left the band. Charters moved to the US, and Buchanan started a career in television, hosting the popular CITV programme Art Attack from 1990 to 2007. The two remaining members, Keith Knowles and Steve Dinwoodie later recruited vocalist Sav Pearse and guitarist Marc Railton from local Liverpool band Savage Lucy to complete a third album entitled Touch the Night, on the Ultra Noise label in 1984. A song from the album, "Walking on a Highware" became Marseille's first and only single to enter the UK Singles chart, peaking at number 98 and spending one week in the listing. However, lack of industry interest in the band caused this iteration of Marseille to split up soon after. Touch the Night was labeled by Kerrang! magazine as a closet classic that should have taken the band to higher ground.

In 2003, a two-disc CD aptly titled Rock You Tonight became the Marseille Anthology and was released by Castle Communications, a subsidiary division of Sanctuary Records Group. The album, containing material from all three of Marseille's previous albums, garnered some critical acclaim being hailed "The best box set of 2003" by George Smith of Village Voice magazine.

The original line-up reunited for a handful of gigs in 2008, however, Paul Dale soon left the band and was replaced in February 2009 by Nigel Roberts. The band recorded an EP, FourPlay which was produced by Neil Buchanan, and released on the Gas Station Music label in 2009. In 2010, Keith Knowles and Steve Dinwoodie stepped down to be replaced by Gareth Webb (drums) and Lee Andrews (bass). The band recorded their first full album in 25 years, Unfinished Business, which was also produced by Buchanan, and later released on September 6, 2010. The album was unveiled at the band's appearance at the Hard Rock Hell festival in December 2010. A full UK tour supported by Exit State followed.

In April 2011, drummer Gareth Webb stepped down and was replaced by Ace Finchum (also a member of Tigertailz) on drums. A few months later, bassist Lee Andrews also left the band and was replaced by Kevin Wynn (mid-2011), then by Phil Ireland (late 2011-early 2012), then by Rob Brooks (2012-2014) and later by and Tim Edmunds (2025-2026). The band continued a heavy gig schedule from 2011 to early 2012, and worked on new material for a release in 2012 but this never materialised. The band were featured in several appearances at gigs and concerts, including the 2012 Cambridge Rock Festival and the Hard Rock Hell VI: A Fistful Of Rock in late 2012; however, those appearances were cancelled. Later, Marseille announced a UK tour planned for November 2013, which was later postponed to 2014 due to Andy Charters' travel visa problems. It was also announced that an EP will be released in the Summer of 2014, to coincide with the tour, however, those plans were cancelled as well. During that time, both drummer Ace Finchum and bassist Rob Brooks left the band.

In 2017, vocalist Nigel Roberts announced that both Neil Buchanan and Andy Charters, the remaining two original members of Marseille, will no longer play on the band, due to Buchanan's consultancy work for children's television and Charters still living in the US, with Buchanan being replaced by guitarist Darren Daz Green, as well as the return of drummer Gareth Webb and bassist Lee Andrews, who previously worked on the album Unfinished Business. On August 22, 2019, Marseille made his first gig in seven years at Stoke-On-Trent, UK, with Roberts on vocals, Webb on drums, Andrews on bass guitar/backing vocals, and Green on guitar.

Former drummer Ace Finchum died in October 2025, at the age of 62.

== Band members ==
Former members

- Steve Dinwoodie: bass guitar, backing vocals (1976–2010)
- Keith Knowles: drums, backing vocals (1976–2010)
- Neil Buchanan: lead guitar, backing vocals (1976–1980; 2008–2014)
- Andy Charters: rhythm guitar (1976–1980; 2008–2014)
- Paul Dale: lead vocals (1976–1980; 2008–2009)
- Sav Pearce: lead vocals (1980–2008)
- Marc Railton: lead and rhythm guitar, backing vocals (1980–2008)
- Mark Hay: rhythm guitar (1982–1984)
- Nigel Roberts: lead vocals (2009–2019)
- Lee Andrews: bass guitar, backing vocals (2010–2011, 2017–2019)
- Gareth Webb: drums (2010–2011, 2017–2019)
- Ace Finchum: drums (2011–2014; died 2025)
- Rob Brooks: bass guitar, backing vocals (2012–2014)
- Darren Daz Green: lead guitar (2017-2019)

Touring musicians

- Kevin Wynn: bass (2011)
- Phil Ireland: bass guitar, backing vocals (2011–2012)
- Rob Brooks: bass guitar, backing vocals (2012–2014)
- Tim Edmunds: bass (2025–2026)

== Discography ==
Albums

- Red White and Slightly Blue (1978): Mountain
- Marseille (1979): Mountain
- Touch the Night (1984): Ultra! Noise
- Unfinished Business (2010): Gas Station Music

Compilations

- Rock You Tonight: The Anthology (2003): Castle Communications

EPs

- FourPlay (2009): Gas Station Music

7-inch singles

- "The French Way" (1978): Mountain
- "Kiss Like Rock & Roll" (1978): Mountain
- "Over and Over" (1979): Mountain
- "Bring on the Dancing Girls" (1979): Mountain
- "Kites" (1980): Mountain
- "Walking on a Highwire" (1984): Ultra! Noise (10,000 of which were pressed in limited edition silver vinyl)

12-inch singles

- "(Do It) The French Way" (1977): Varèse International

== See also ==
- List of new wave of British heavy metal bands
