= Simeon Courtie =

English broadcaster and writer

- Born: Simeon Armstrong Courtie; 1 April 1970 (age 56); Swindon, Wiltshire, England
- Other name: Sim
- Occupations: Broadcaster, writer and communication skills trainer
- Known for: BBC Television (Children's BBC), BFBS Radio, the books The Long and Whining Road and All Hollow

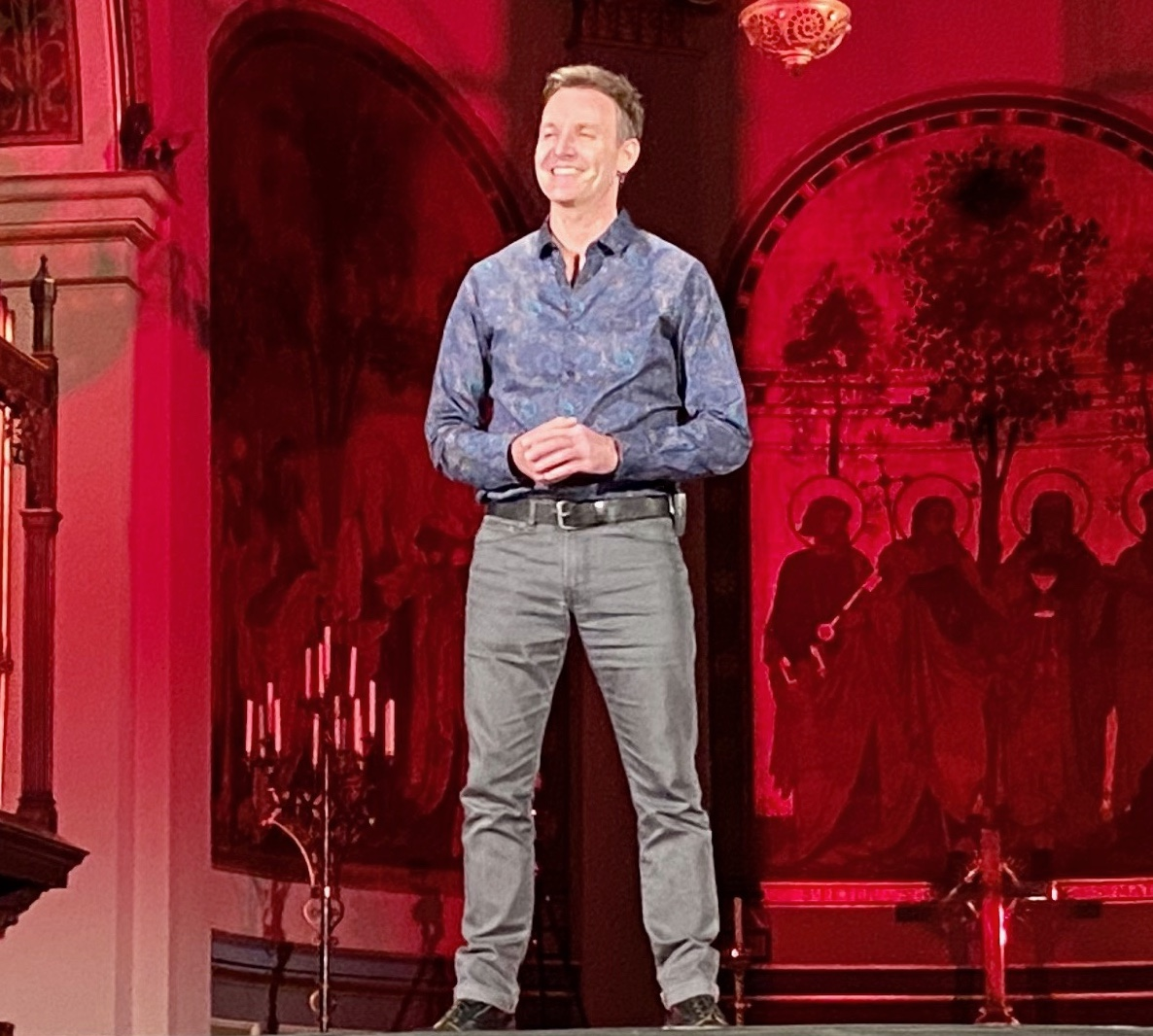
Simeon Courtie presenting a TEDx talk

Simeon Courtie (born 1 April 1970) is an English broadcaster and writer. He is best known as a television presenter on Children's BBC, a radio presenter on BFBS, and BBC local radio, a comedy writer for television and radio programmes including Have I Got News For You?, and as the author of the humorous travel book The Long and Whining Road. and the thriller All Hollow.

== Career ==
Courtie left school in 1986 and trained as a mechanical and electrical engineer, completing a four-year apprenticeship at a printing press manufacturer in Kettering. During this period he volunteered at hospital radio and BBC Radio Northampton, where he began his full-time broadcasting career in 1990 as a reporter and presenter.

In 1993 he joined BBC Two’s pop music programme The O-Zone. He later became a full-time presenter for Children's BBC where he hosted the live continuity links alongside the puppet Otis the Aardvark. Their humour developed a cult following, particularly among older viewers.

Between 1996 and 2000 Courtie presented several ITV programmes, including the live Saturday morning show Wow!, You'll Never Believe It, and Get Wet produced by Scottish Television as well as BBC Education series such as Working in... and Revise Wise.

From 2000 to 2005 he created television quiz and game show formats, including ESP for Channel Five and the Welsh-language quiz show Risg.

He was a regular presenter on BFBS from 1997 to 2013, and later contributed as a writer to Have I Got News For You?

In 2010 he travelled around the world with his family in a camper van, busking Beatles songs to raise money for UNICEF This journey formed the basis of The Long and Whining Road, published in 2012 and winner of the London Book Festival grand prize.

In 2013 Courtie won a New York Festival Radio Award for Best Radio Personality. He subsequently presented a daily programme on BBC Wiltshire, and, in 2015, became the first broadcaster to host a live radio show from CERN.

In 2016 his podcast Serial Box, a satire of the global podcast hit Serial, achieved notoriety when the makers of the original Serial issued a Cease and Desist order claiming copyright infringement of the letter 'S'.

Courtie published his debut novel All Hollow in 2019; it received several international literary awards.

In 2020 he delivered a TEDx talk called Aristotle the Ultimate Stand Up Comedian and founded the communication skills company Kindred Skills.

A keen musician, in 2025 he released his debut album Jung At Heart in which each song represents a Carl Jung character archetype. The songs Hero and Shapeshifter received international songwriting awards.

== Awards ==
For The Long and Whining Road:

London Book Festival Grand Prize Winner, 2012

USA Book News International Book Award Winner, 'Humor' category, 2013

Readers' Favorite Gold Award, 'Humour' category, 2013

IPPY Award for Independent Publishing, 'Travel' category, 2013

Shirley You Jest, winner 2013

For All Hollow:

Distinguished Favourite Independent Press Award, 2020

Silver eLit Award, 2020

International Book Awards Finalist, 2020

Best Thriller finalist, Killer Nashville Awards, 2020

For broadcasting:

Silver New York Festival Award, Best Radio Personality, 2013

For Jung At Heart:

Hero - Song of the Year semi-finalist

Shapeshifter - Song of the Year semi-finalist

== Personal life ==
Courtie is married to former BBC journalist Jillian Moody. They have three children and live in a caravan in Warwickshire.
