= It's a Mystery (TV series) =

- Also known as: Mystery (2002)
- Written by: Nic Ayling (Series 1–5); Mark Sidaway (Series 1); Matt Porter (Series 1); Amy Bingham (Series 2); Alistair Merrifield (Series 3–4); Leo Morgan (Series 3–4); Helena Stylianou (Series 3); Zoe Symonds (Series 3–5); Tim Edmunds (Series 5); Jo Clark (Series 5)
- Directed by: Paul Walker (Series 1&2); Ian Bolt (Series 3); Simon Pearce (Series 4&5)
- Starring: Neil Buchanan (1996–2000); Gail Porter (1997–1999); Sophie Aldred (1996); Tristan Bancks (1997–1999); Ben Jones (2000); Shelley Blond (2000); Steve Wilson (2002); Shiarra Juthan (2002)
- Country of origin: United Kingdom
- Original language: English
- No. of series: 5
- No. of episodes: 44

Production
- Producers: Neil Buchanan; Tim Edmunds; Helen Dawson; Driana Jones; Nic Ayling
- Running time: 20 minutes
- Production companies: The Media Merchants; Meridian Broadcasting

Original release
- Network: ITV (Children's ITV)
- Release: 12 September 1996 – 9 May 2002

It's a Mystery is a networked Children's ITV programme which ran for five series from 12 September 1996 to 9 May 2002. It was produced by The Media Merchants Television Company Ltd for Meridian Broadcasting Ltd. In Series five, the show was retitled as Mystery and featured different presenters. It was a magazine show featuring unusual stories including about UFOs, ghosts and other difficult to explain happenings, some of which were solved while others remained unexplained.

Neil Buchanan, best known for his regular arts show Art Attack, hosted the first series with Doctor Who actor Sophie Aldred. For the second and third series, Neil was joined by Gail Porter (1997–1999) from magazine show How 2 along with Tristan Bancks. In 2000, Gail and Tristan were replaced by Ben Jones and Shelley Blond. Following Neil's departure, Steve Wilson and Shiarra Juthan presented the final series in 2002.

== Format ==
It was a programme that educated children by challenging them to solve a mystery. Usually this would involve people telling stories of mysterious occurrences that have happened to them, such as a Man in a Van driving up to a roundabout and seeing his exact duplicate across the roundabout, driving the same vehicle. Other times, the presenter would show unexplained phenomena such as ghosts in the Tower of London or the Loch Ness Monster. The production is Tim Edmunds. The presenter would then offer up possible explanations as to what might have been behind the mystery or if there is even an explanation to give. After each story, it would be given a solved or unsolved designation. At the end of each episode, a riddle would be asked for the audience to solve until the next episode (where the answer would be given).

Forty-four episodes were made, and the series regularly made the Children's Top Ten.

== Presenters ==
The programme was originally presented by Neil Buchanan and Sophie Aldred (Series One); Neil Buchanan, Gail Porter, and Tristan Bancks (Series Two and Three); Neil Buchanan, Ben Jones and Shelley Blond (Series Four); Steve Wilson and Shiarra Juthan (Series Five).

The series used many actors over the years. These included; Jo-Anne Good (Crossroads, BBC London 94.9), Russell Hookey (Channel Report, Lookaround, ITV News Anglia, ITN News), Barry Rose (Crossroads), Mike Dyer-Ball (Casualty), and Hal Dyer (Rentaghost, On the Buses, George and Mildred).

== Transmission guide ==
- Series 1: 10 editions from 12 September 1996 – 13 November 1996
- Series 2: 7 editions from 3 September 1997 – 15 October 1997
- Series 3: 10 editions from 4 January 1999 – 8 March 1999
- Series 4: 7 editions from 3 April 2000 – 5 June 2000
- Series 5: 10 editions from 9 April 2002 – 9 May 2002
