= Diane Youdale =

English TV personality

- Born: Diane Patricia Youdale; 13 February 1970 (age 56); Billingham, Teesside, England
- Other name: Jet
- Occupations: Television personality; psychotherapist
- Known for: Gladiators (1992–1996); Finders Keepers (1996); You Bet! (1996)
- Spouse(s): George Mayhew (m. 1997, divorced) Zoe Gilbert (m. 2023; div. 2025)

Diane Jetstrong (born Diane Patricia Youdale; 13 February 1970) is an English television personality, who played Jet on the television series Gladiators (1992–1996).

== Career ==
In 1990, Youdale played the She-Wolf in the Finnegan/Pinchuk Company, HTV and MCA Television Entertainment production, She-Wolf of London. The prosthetics required took four hours to apply and three hours to remove.

Youdale trained as a choreographer before joining Gladiators at the age of 22. In November 1994, she released her first single, "I Don't Know", a collaboration with ISM, which reached a peak of 100 on the UK singles chart. An accompanying album, No Covers, released in the same year, failed to chart. She left the Gladiators in 1996 after sustaining a neck injury on the show. She later said that she did not want to risk a more serious injury. She then co-hosted the final original series of Finders Keepers with Neil Buchanan in 1996, and in the same year, was the hostess on You Bet!, with Darren Day.

Youdale later retrained as a psychotherapist. In 2008, it was announced that Sky was developing a revival of Gladiators. In an interview with Loaded magazine, Youdale said that "Sky reckon they're going to run it for three to four years so I've said to them why not wait until the last ever episode and then I make my comeback then?". She ended up as a reporter on the show, as well as co-hosting the Gladiators podcast.

Later in 2008, Youdale joined BBC Tees to co-present the weekday mid-morning show with Neil Green. She co-presented the programme from 22 September 2008 to 21 January 2011.

== Personal life ==
Youdale was brought up in Billingham, County Durham. Her father was Jack Youdale, who was the BBC Tees astronomer for 30 years.

Youdale dated fellow Gladiator James Crossley (Hunter) for two years. She later married political lobbyist George Mayhew in 1997 and lived in the London area as she trained in psychotherapy. After separation and divorce, she spent her time between North East England and Surrey. In July 2023, she married Zoe Gilbert. The pair met in a supermarket, and discussed their life together whilst appearing on the Lorraine show. Diane announced their split in February 2025.

In February 2025, Diane announced in a sit-down interview with "People Are Deep" YouTube channel that she has legally changed her name by deed poll to "Diane Jetstrong".

Jetstrong is a supporter of Middlesbrough F.C.

Diane is now in a long term relationship with social media personality Denise Bowles.
