= Finders Keepers (1991 game show) =

British children's game show

- Genre: Children's Game show
- Presented by: Neil Buchanan; Jeff Brazier
- Starring: Diane Youdale
- Country of origin: United Kingdom
- Original language: English
- No. of series: 7
- No. of episodes: 88

Production
- Producer: Tim Edmunds
- Running time: 25 minutes
- Production companies: World Wide International Television in association with TVS (Later Scottish Television) (1991–6); The Foundation (2006)

Original release
- Network: ITV (CITV)
- Release: 12 April 1991 – 6 August 1996
- Release: 6 January – 14 April 2006

Related
- Finders Keepers (US version)

Finders Keepers is a British children's game show based on the original American format of the same name. It was originally broadcast on ITV between 12 April 1991 and 6 August 1996, hosted by Neil Buchanan. It was then revived from 6 January to 14 April 2006, hosted by Jeff Brazier.

A pilot episode hosted by Andrew O'Connor was recorded in 1988 on the set of the Larry Toffler-hosted American version.

== Format ==
Two teams of two called the green meanies and the yellow terrors are given the opportunity to "raid the room" across eight rooms and two rounds to find hidden objects, found by clues read out by the host prior to raiding. Each room raid lasted 30 seconds and if the object was found, won the team 25 points in the first round, and 50 points in the second. If a team did not find their object, the points went to the other team. Each raid was hectic because the rooms had streamers, confetti, and Silly String raining from the ceiling as the raids went on.

In the early series of the original run, the teams had to firstly win rooms to raid at the garage door, they go off and raid them as above. The process was repeated for the second round. The production is Tim Edmunds. In later series both teams had two rooms to raid from the off; the later four rooms were won at the garage door. The final series of the original run in 1996 saw format changes; the teams now had to find items in the garage to get a head start in room searching. They were now searching for the same item on both floors of the house.

The 2006 revival returned to the format of the original without the "find objects in a garage" round and changed the final round time limit back to three minutes.

In all versions the team with the most points win the right to go the "Super Search", which is a race to find eight hidden objects in three (later four) minutes. The more objects found, the better the final prize. The final series of the original run had a prize awarded for successful searching in each room and a grand prize in the final room, closer to the original American format.

The teams were color-coded green and yellow; in the US version, they were red and blue.

== Rooms ==
- Top Floor
  - Mum and Dad's Bedroom
  - Bathroom
  - Kids' Bedroom
  - Fantasy Room/Attic (Series 6 only)/Mystery Room
- Bottom Floor
  - Store Room/Utility Room (Series 6 only)/Garden Room
  - Kitchen
  - Living Room
  - Study

== Jeremy's Joker ==
In the 3rd, 4th and 5th seasons of the Buchanan era, the Fantasy Room had Jeremy's Joker on them. If the team found the object, they would win both the standard 50 points and a prize. Prizes ranged from personal stereos and club memberships to day and weekend trips. This was named after Jeremy Stockwell, the in voice announcer and writer of for the early Finders Keepers series.

In the first 2 seasons, one of the rooms was the "Surprise Prize" room, usually signalled with a fanfare playing as the room was entered. Both Jeremy's Joker and the Surprise Prize were identical to the Instant Prize room on the American version, but unlike the American version, this room could show up in any round and the opposing team would win the prize if the team searching the prize room failed to find the object.

== Celebrity Guests ==
In several episodes of series 3, 4 and 5, there were celebrity guests, usually to be found in the Fantasy Room. In the Sleeping Beauty-themed room, Frank Bruno was sleeping behind a curtain and the contestants had to find a clue without waking Frank. In the last episode of series 3, Neighbours twins Gayle and Gillian Blakeney appeared from a giant teapot in the Mad Hatter's tea party-themed room.

More celebrity guests would appear in series 4 to aid the contestants. The first episode of series 4 featured Olympic swimmer Adrian Moorhouse in an Underwater-themed room, Gladiator Panther guest appeared in a Jungle-themed room, Grange Hill's Anna Quayle appeared in a School-themed room and in the last episode of series 4, Bro & Bro from What's Up Doc? in Little Red Riding Hood's room.

Even more celebrity guests appeared in series 5 to help the contestants including Michael Aherne and Jefferson King (a.k.a. Warrior and Shadow) from Gladiators, Danny John-Jules from Red Dwarf and athlete Roger Black.

The celebrity guests would also make cameo appearances in the Super Search, performing mundane tasks throughout the house as a visual gag while the contestants passed through the rooms.

In the final original series (1996), Buchanan was joined by Gladiators star Diane Youdale as co-host, there was no celebrity guest.

== Transmissions ==
Series	Start date	End date	Episodes	Presenter
1	12 April 1991	5 July 1991	13	Neil Buchanan
2	8 January 1992	1 April 1992	13	Neil Buchanan
3	23 March 1993	15 June 1993	13	Neil Buchanan
4	15 March 1994	7 June 1994	13	Neil Buchanan
5	2 May 1995	25 July 1995	13	Neil Buchanan
6	18 June 1996	6 August 1996	8	Neil Buchanan/Diane Youdale
7	6 January 2006	14 April 2006	15	Jeff Brazier
