= Lloyd Warbey =

English television presenter

Lloyd Warbey is an English television presenter, actor and live events producer, best known for presenting the Disney Junior revival of Art Attack, which began airing in 2013. His episodes continued to be broadcast for a number of years in the UK and internationally, and remain available on Disney’s streaming platforms.

== Career ==
Warbey trained as an actor at East 15 Acting School and has performed in UK national tours and stage productions as well as on television. In 2013, he presented a Disney Junior revival of Art Attack, which began airing that year. His episodes continued to be broadcast for a number of years in the UK and internationally, and remain available on Disney's streaming platforms.

Warbey is also the director of Glow Experiential Agency and Yippidoo Events Ltd, delivering experiential campaigns, family arts-and-crafts activations and seasonal grotto operations for shopping centres and public venues across the UK.

=== Theatre ===
Warbey's stage credits include UK national tours of Joseph and the Amazing Technicolor Dreamcoat and The Jungle Book.

== Pantomime ==
Warbey has been a regular performer in British pantomime for more than two decades, most often appearing in comic roles. His credits include productions for UK Productions, Enchanted Productions, Jordan Productions, Polka Dot Pantomimes and Paul Holman Associates.

In 2021 he played Peter Pan at Malvern Theatres in a UK Productions staging, alongside Tom Lister and Mark James.

=== Selected pantomimes ===
- 2018 – Aladdin (Scarborough Spa, Enchanted Productions) – Silly Simon.
- 2021 – Peter Pan (Malvern Theatres, UK Productions) – Peter Pan.

== Charity and community work ==
Warbey has supported a number of educational and community initiatives. In May 2019, he became the first patron of Mitchell's Miracles, a Romford-based children's neuroblastoma charity, as recorded in the charity's annual report to the Charity Commission.
