= Neil Buchanan =

British television presenter and musician (born 1956)

- Born: 11 October 1956 (age 70); Fazakerley, Liverpool, Merseyside, England
- Education: Liverpool Institute High School for Boys
- Occupations: TV presenter, TV producer, musician, artist
- Years active: 1976–present
- Notable work: Art Attack (1990–2007); Finders Keepers (1991–1996)
- Spouse: Nicola K. Buchanan
- Children: 2
- Musical career
- Genre: Heavy metal
- Instrument: Guitar
- Labels: Mountain; RCA; Ultranoise; Gas Station Music
- Website: neilbuchanan.co.uk

Notes
- Co-founder of The Media Merchants

Neil Buchanan (born 11 October 1956) is an English artist, photographer, and musician, best known for his work on British children's television. During his tenure as a children's television presenter, he hosted the CITV programme Art Attack, a television programme that he co-created, during its original run from 1990 to 2007, as well as Finders Keepers and It's a Mystery, while he also produced and starred in CITV's ZZZap!.

== Early life ==
Buchanan was born in 1956 in Fazakerley. He attended Barlows Lane Primary School and Liverpool Institute High School for Boys.

== Career ==
Buchanan was in the heavy metal band "Marseille" which formed in 1976: they were part of the new wave of British heavy metal scene, releasing four albums and six singles, touring America and performing with Judas Priest, Nazareth and Whitesnake. The band reformed in 2009 with a performance at The Cavern Club, Liverpool.

=== Television ===
Buchanan made his television debut on a Saturday morning show called No. 73, later renamed 7T3. He had attended the original audition, having met the No. 73 producers when his band Marseille appeared on Southern Television's Saturday Banana. He did not become a regular until the third series of No. 73 shown in 1983. After production ceased on 7T3 in 1988, he went on to present Motormouth, another Saturday morning children's programme made by TVS alongside Gaby Roslin. Buchanan stayed with Motormouth until the show's cancellation in 1992.

He was the creator and presenter of the CITV show Art Attack from its inception in 1990 until the show ended in 2007. The show won two BAFTA awards. In March 2000, Britt Allcroft (subsequently Gullane Entertainment) purchased the rights to the series from Buchanan in a £14 million transaction.

In 1991, he hosted the British version of Finders Keepers, a room-raiding game show for TVS, then Scottish Television when TVS lost their license to broadcast. He co-hosted the show with Diane Youdale, the former Gladiators star, in its final series in 1996. He also presented Animal Crazy with co-host Jenny Powell for two series between 1994 and 1995 which was produced by the Media Merchants for Granada Television, and It's a Mystery alongside Sophie Aldred, from 1996 to 1999.

From 1995 to 1997, Buchanan presented the awards show The CITV Awards, which gave viewers a chance to vote on who they think should win a CITV award.

Buchanan briefly appeared as a guest on Celebrity Juice on 8 November 2012 during series 8 episode 11, in which he discussed ending Art Attack and his current activities, playing with his band.

In 2017, Nigel Roberts, vocalist for Marseille, announced that Buchanan had stepped away from the band owing to his consultancy work for children's television.

In September 2020, due to rumours spreading online, Buchanan released a statement denying suggestions that he was the English-based street artist Banksy.
