= ZBC =

ZBC may refer to:

- The IATA location identifier for Colmore Row Bus Station - Birmingham (UK)
- Zimbabwe Broadcasting Corporation
- Zion Bible College, a bible college in Haverhill, Massachusetts, now called Northpoint Bible College
- ZIZ Broadcasting Corporation (ZBC), national broadcasting service of Saint Kitts and Nevis
