= Television South =

ITV franchise holder for the South and South East of England (1982–92)

- The TVS region when it lost its franchise in 1992
- Type: Region of television network
- Branding: TVS
- Country: England
- First air date: 1 January 1982; 44 years ago
- Founded: 1980
- TV transmitters: Rowridge, Dover, Hannington, Bluebell Hill, Midhurst, Whitehawk Hill, Chillerton Down, Heathfield
- Headquarters: Northam, Southampton and Vinters Park, Maidstone
- Broadcast area: South East England and Central South
- Owner: TVS Entertainment plc
- Key people: James Gatward, Greg Dyke
- Dissolved: 31 December 1992; 33 years ago (after 10 years, 365 days)
- Picture format: PAL 625 lines
- Affiliation: ITV
- Language: English
- Replaced: Southern Television
- Replaced by: Meridian Broadcasting

Television South (TVS) was the ITV franchise holder in the South and South East of England between 1 January 1982 at 9.25 am and 31 December 1992 at 11.59 pm. The company operated under various names, initially as Television South plc and then following reorganisation in 1989 as TVS Entertainment plc, with UK broadcasting activities undertaken by subsidiary TVS Television Ltd.

During its 11-year history, TVS produced a number of notable programmes for the ITV network especially in the fields of drama, light entertainment and children's programming. It was also a significant regional broadcaster producing a wide range of programmes for its area with the flagship being the nightly award-winning news programme Coast to Coast produced as two separate editions for the South and South East.

TVS ceased broadcasting on 31 December 1992 after losing its franchise to Meridian Broadcasting during the review of franchise holders in 1991. The company was sold to the US firm International Family Entertainment in 1993.

The trademarks of Television South are now owned by an independent production company, while a majority of the company's back catalogue is now owned by The Walt Disney Company. TVS Television Ltd itself was in existence until 2018, and was ultimately a non-trading subsidiary of Virgin Media.

== Formation ==
Television South was formed following discussions between television producer James Gatward, television executive Bob Southgate, who had previously worked at ITN, Thames Television, and journalist Martin Jackson to apply for the new south and south-east of England ITV franchise in 1980. Finance was provided by Barclays Bank and Charterhouse investment bank. This area was the most hotly contested, with seven other applicants besides TVS and the incumbent Southern Television.

The Independent Broadcasting Authority had decided to increase the area covered by the south to now include the south east. This meant switching the main Bluebell Hill transmitter, and associated relays (including the important relay at Tunbridge Wells) to broadcast Television South (TVS) instead of ITV London. To reflect this, the contract area served by Southern Television, which was previously titled the south of England area, was renamed south and south-east of England'. To serve the new region better, the IBA expected the successful applicant to operate separate facilities for both the south and the south-east, known as a 'dual-region', with new additional facilities to be built in the south east.

Following the submission of its application, TVS was anticipating that it would be forced into a shotgun marriage with Southern, but in the end, TVS won outright against the seven other contenders since its plans for a better mix of programmes and greater investment were considered good enough to operate the franchise alone. This was the official line given by the IBA, but it was also considered that Southern's non-local ownership (the majority shareholders were Associated Newspapers, based in London, and D.C. Thomson, based in Dundee) and its very conservative nature led to it being dropped in favour of the more interesting proposals made by TVS in its franchise application.

By the start of 1981 a number of high-profile personalities had joined the station in preparation for the start of the new franchise:

- Michael Blakstad, formerly of Tomorrow's World, as director of programmes;
- Anna Home, formerly of BBC children's output, as head of programmes for children and young people;
- Michael Rodd, as head of science and industry programmes;
- Herbert Chappell, in charge features, education and music.

During 1981, TVS's ambitions were soon recognised for their desire to have a greater say in how ITV operated and its dismay on how it was being treated by the "Big Five" ITV companies: Thames Television, LWT, Central Independent Television, Yorkshire Television and Granada Television. The rationale was that the larger ITV companies should bear more of the production costs as their size enabled them to. This led to criticism in some quarters that the larger of the remaining 'regional' ITV companies, such as TVS, Anglia Television, Scottish Television, Tyne Tees Television and HTV, found it difficult to get network access for their major productions, and that they were left with softer non-primetime sectors such as children's and religious television.

Michael Blakstad, director of programmes, claimed ITV needed a shake up as an advertiser, and viewers did not like contemplating the ITV nightly programme offering and were thus hoping the 'Big Five' would welcome TVS with open arms as a chance to light up the schedules, as the only 'occasional flash of excitement' appeared from LWT's The South Bank Show. Blakstad also claimed none of TVS's £2 million worth of new programming had been accepted for networked transmission, and TVS was invited to the monthly contractors' meetings as observer only from May 1982. He also expressed doubts that Yorkshire Television would give up its monopoly of networked science programmes. Blakstad stated: 'TVS was awarded the franchise to bring a catalyst to ITV, but the authority may have to help them get into the laboratory first.'

In the days before the start of the new franchise, the Independent Broadcasting Authority made it clear that they were happy about the service changes, and were particularly impressed with TVS in connection with new programming for the ITV network in areas in which the IBA wished for improvements, mainly children's output and the sciences. TVS's aims were for a different line of programming in the early evening slots, to win back the 50,000 viewers it claimed were switching over to rivals, due to the poor service provided by Southern.

TVS began broadcasting at 9.30 am on Friday 1 January 1982. The new dual-regional station sprang to life with its new specially composed start-up theme – variously named but referred to in-house as TVS Gallop – accompanied by a programme menu and clock. Continuity broadcaster Malcolm Brown, formerly of Granada, made the opening announcement:

Good morning. It's New Year's Day, 1982, and this is Television South. TVS, the new independent television company that's proud to serve both the South and South East of England. To begin with, we bring in the new with, for the first time, our symbol which will soon become very familiar.

Following the first airing of the station's first ident, the first programme to air was a Coast to Coast special entitled Bring in the New, presented by Khalid Aziz. A number of presenters made the transition from Southern to TVS; all production staff were transferred as part of the then-union agreements within ITV that no technician should lose employment as a result of franchise changes. 200 staff were also recruited for the facilities at Gillingham and Maidstone, although a small number of these were made redundant after the company went on-air, as the studios struggled to reach production capacity, restricted by TVS's limited access to the ITV network.

=== Broadcasting years ===
Prior to broadcasting, TVS refused to take on most of Southern's programme stock, except the arrangement to cover two Glyndebourne operas each year. Following the launch of Channel 4 in November 1982, the operas were shown on that channel. Houseparty was replaced by Not For Women Only which recognised changes in women's social patterns, while a new Saturday morning children's series called No. 73 was also introduced, locally at first, before being networked.

Whitbread acquired a 20% stake in TVS from European Ferries in April 1984, as the latter wished to concentrate its financial and management resources on the shipping and property sectors, but sold on the stake in November 1986. Financial director Lionel Ross said:

We think that Television South remains a very good company but we carried out a review of our investments and decided to concentrate our energies elsewhere.

In August 1984, Greg Dyke joined TVS as director of programmes, coming from TV-am. He was brought in to rejuvenate the station, and started to move programming away from its original philosophy of niche arts and science programming, and began producing more entertainment programmes. In 1985, an agreement was reached with LWT, which required help to fill its schedules with appropriate, domestically produced programming while not having to increase its budget; thus TVS was able to get more of its programmes onto the ITV network slots, such as Bobby Davro on the Box, Catchphrase, C.A.T.S Eyes, Five Alive, Kelly's Eye, The Ruth Rendell Mysteries, Summertime Special and other light entertainment programmes. TVS retained their original philosophy for regional and children's programmes.

By November 1986, the station became one of the most heavily criticised companies by the IBA over its programming; the criticism mainly concerned the Southampton editions of Coast to Coast while issues were raised over the quality of TVS's drama and light entertainment output. Its education series were "too didactic", while the religious output was branded as having "barely discernible religious content". Dyke accepted the IBA criticism but highlighted that TVS had already begun remedying the issues and faults, with a new editor for its Southampton news operation, and a new head of religious output was brought in, along with a controller of drama - a first for TVS. Once again, TVS expressed concern about its relationship with the Big Five ITV stations, and how they controlled the channel's output. In April 1987, Greg Dyke left TVS and returned to LWT.

By TVS's fifth anniversary in 1987, its profits had grown 62% since 1981 to £14.4 million, which was helped after TVS increased its share of programming for ITV network and growth in new business; warnings were made that inflation and cost was higher, but the projected growth of television operations would be around 7–8% during the rest of the year. The result was that the accounts revealed TVS had become bigger than Yorkshire Television in terms of advertising revenue, and was quickly catching up with the other Big Five ITV companies. By the following January, profits had increased again to £21.8m. There was speculation at the time that the technicians' strike at TV-am could have spread to TVS's operations over its plans to provide an overnight service, which become fully operational by June 1988.

With TVS continuing to generate large profits, but restricted in ITV network programming, the company started to search for other investments. In 1985, it launched failed bids to acquire Thorn EMI Screen Entertainment and the French television channel TF1. In 1986, TVS was successful in buying Midem, an organisation that promoted trade fairs; and Gilson International, a Los Angeles distribution company selling programmes outside the US. TVS also acquired a 3.5% stake in Australia Network Ten company Northern Star.

At the start of July 1988, speculation started to appear of a take-over bid for the American media company MTM Enterprises. Within a few days, MTM was bought for £190m, which gave owner and founder Mary Tyler Moore 5.1% shares in TVS, and Arthur Price, chief executive of MTM, a total of 6.6%.; both agreed not to sell for a period of five years. TVS paid for the deal partly by selling 10% stakes for £29.2m each to Générale D'Images (a cable television, film library and film production group) and Canal Plus, asking shareholders for £47.8m through a convertible preference share issue, with the remaining £38m taken out in a bank loan. The deal created a unique company with productions operations in Ireland, UK and USA, along with a UK broadcasting franchise.

Uncertainty over the high price paid by TVS for MTM, coupled with a collapse of a US syndication market which affected many other US stations, plus a £5.7m write-off from the disposal of Super Channel resulted in financial instability. In January 1990, TVS started searching for a buyer for a 49% stake in MTM, as part of the restructuring of MTM due to losses of £7.3m. A few days later, TVS confirmed profits were down 35% in 1989, which resulted in 140 redundancies across the UK; this was not as bad as expected, since TVS had planned to eliminate up to 200 jobs that summer.

Ahead of the ITV franchise round, James Gatward resigned from TVS, after being informed his services were no longer required, as the board believed he was not showing sufficient resolve in preparing TVS for the franchise bid. Further changes took place, with the TVS Television board being merged into the TVS Entertainment board, along with a further 100 redundancies to help strengthen the finances. In March 1991, four contenders were lined up to buy MTM, which would have seen the company being sold off for around £50m; there were hopes that the deal would be sorted by May before the ITV franchise application was submitted.

== Loss of franchise ==
In 1990, the new Broadcasting Act was passed by parliament, which deregulated broadcasting in the UK and removed the monopoly on programme production held by franchise holders. Changes to network broadcasting and the introduction of cable and satellite channels meant that ITV needed to be leaner and fitter to compete with its new rivals.

The original draft of the Broadcasting Act stated that the applicant with the highest cash bid would win; however, following fears that this would financially stretch the network and diminish programme standards, the concept of a 'quality threshold' was introduced. Incumbents and applicants had to pass this first, before cash bids were even considered; even then, if a cash bid was deemed to impact on plans, the application could be rejected.

The lucrative nature of the TVS contract area made it one of the most desirable franchises in the UK. Despite preparing vast amounts of audience research, programming proposals and an extremely comprehensive application document for the ITC, the TVS board – now minus its founder Gatward – calculated that it needed to outbid all opposition to retain its licence. This resulted in the 'bid high or die' strategy, in which the management calculated the highest possible bid that TVS could possibly afford. The result of these calculations was a £59 million per annum bid, payable for the following 10 years; it was the highest bid made by any UK television broadcaster.

The ITC announced the results of the franchise battle by releasing simultaneous faxes to the contending companies. Three companies had passed the so-called programme 'quality threshold' – TVS, Carlton and Meridian Broadcasting. Of these three, TVS's bid was the highest. However, the ITC now asserted it also needed confidence that the winning company could sustain its annual payments throughout the entire period of the 10-year licence; the commission claimed that TVS would not be able to sustain the proposed annual £59 million licence payments. The ITC then awarded the licence to Meridian Broadcasting, which had bid only £36 million per year.

The ITC refused every attempt to get it to explain its decision. TVS could have sought a judicial review, but the legal advice that it received was that the prospect of success would be slim and the costs would be enormous. Whilst it carried on broadcasting to the end of its franchise period, it began partially liquidating the company. The studio facilities at Southampton were sold to the incoming franchise winner Meridian Broadcasting, even though it intended to operate as a 'publisher broadcaster' and would not be making anything like the amount of regional programming made by TVS. The Maidstone Studios were retained with the news facility being leased to Meridian as TVS planned to continue trading as an independent producer.

The unions started to negotiate with Meridian to absorb some of the 800 staff at TVS who were facing redundancy. Meridian planned to employ only 370 staff, as it intended to produce a far smaller amount of network programming and would use independent producers for the remainder of its programming. In the event, the projections of advertising revenue on which TVS had based its massive bid turned out to be correct. However, only three years later, all the high-bidding licensees – including HTV, which had nearly bankrupted itself to put forward a £25 million bid to retain the licence for Wales and the West – were allowed to reduce their payments, in some cases by more than half.

=== Closing night ===
TVS ceased broadcasting to the South and South East of England at just before midnight on 31 December 1992. While most other ITV stations were broadcasting the Thames Television farewell programme The End of the Year Show, Scottish and Grampian chose to opt out and instead aired their traditional Hogmanay special, while TVS chose to opt out and air its own final programme entitled Goodbye to All That, a 65-minute retrospective of its programming, presented by Fred Dinenage and Fern Britton and recorded in front of a studio audience at the Northam studios in Southampton on 13 December that year. The programme closed with an amended version of the TVS ident, along with the message 'Thanks for watching' before crossing to Big Ben for the New Year chimes at midnight and the handover to Meridian Broadcasting.

=== Post-franchise era ===
In the Autumn of 1992, a number of American companies were interested in acquiring TVS, from the likes of TCW Capital, International Family Entertainment Inc. (IFE) and Lorne Michaels. IFE originally made a bid worth £38.2m and received backing from a number of key shareholders for this to be accepted. A small number of shareholders, including Julian Tregar, rejected the offer from IFE. In November, TCW Capital made a counter bid, but pulled out a few weeks later, after reviewing the accounts of TVS. IFE increased their offer to £45.3 million, but continued to be opposed by Tregar who blocked the deal on technical grounds, as it was alleged that the offer was too low. IFE finally revised and increased their offer to appease the remaining shareholders, and on 23 January 1993, the IFE offer of £56.5 million was finally accepted, with the deal being completed on 1 February that year. The following September, IFE launched a UK version of The Family Channel, based at The Maidstone Studios and using some elements of the TVS programme archive. Flextech was a partner in the venture, taking a 39% stake in the business.

In 1996, IFE sold its remaining 61% share to Flextech, giving it full ownership of the venture, and subsequently, in February 1997, Flextech rebranded the station as Challenge TV, focusing mainly on game shows. IFE was sold to Fox Kids Worldwide (a joint venture of News Corporation and Saban Entertainment), which in turn was acquired by Disney in 2001. The MTM Enterprises library was maintained by 20th Century Fox Television (which was acquired by Disney in 2019).

== Liquidation ==
The corporate entity TVS Television Limited remained in existence until 2018, and was latterly a wholly owned but non-trading subsidiary of Virgin Media.

A final account prior to dissolution had been signed on 4 January 2018. At the time of liquidation the only asset of value was an intercompany receivable balance from Flextech Broadband Limited. TVS Television Limited officially dissolved on 18 April.

== Studio facilities ==
=== Northam, Southampton ===
The Southampton base was the company's corporate headquarters and its primary production and transmission centre. These studios were purchased by TVS from its predecessor Southern, but TVS was delayed in the purchase of the site by Southern and therefore had to initially operate prior to launch from temporary buildings in the Southern car park, leading to Southern contemptuously branding TVS as "Portakabin TV", as referenced in a satirical song performed by Richard Stilgoe on Southern's final programme. TVS finally completed the purchase of the Southampton site, equipment, news library and staff pension fund in August 1981. Also included in the sale was land purchased by Southern for planned new studios in Maidstone. Upon purchase TVS made significant investment, including building a new scenery block to the rear of the existing site. After losing its contract, TVS sold the studios to its successor Meridian Broadcasting in mid-1992. The studios were closed by Meridian in 2004, and demolished in 2010.

=== Vinters Park, Maidstone ===
The studios to serve the eastern section of TVS's transmission area were at Vinters Park near Maidstone in Kent. The site was originally acquired by Southern Television, which had commissioned a conceptual design for new studio facilities on the site. Following the award of the franchise to TVS, Southern Television sold the site to the new company at a premium. Construction commenced in early 1982, and the first studios at the centre became operational in mid-1983.

The Maidstone Studios, though significant (and home to many networked shows) were ancillary to those in Southampton which were the company's corporate headquarters. Meridian Broadcasting, the new licensee, was not offered the studios as TVS initially intended to become an independent producer. However, Meridian agreed to rent the newsroom and facilities for an initial 10-year period from 1993. Following the sale of TVS in that year, the studios were acquired by TVS's new owners IFE and Meridian's agreement came to a premature end. Meridian operated from elsewhere in Maidstone, but in 2004, after extensive cutbacks, it moved back into a small newsroom in The Maidstone Studios, which would later become the official trading and marketing name of the Vinters Park complex, when it was later sold-off as a standalone "four walls" studio complex, later used for shows on BBC and ITV, etc.

=== Dover ===
The studios on Russell Street were originally the eastern base of Southern Television, from which Scene South East and Scene Midweek were broadcast and were essentially a news-gathering operation with transmission facilities for regional news opt-outs. TVS used Dover as a regional studio for a year until completion of Vinters Park when it disposed of the site; the buildings have since been demolished and the site is now St. James Retail Park, a shopping outlet.

=== TVS Television Theatre ===
TVS acquired the former Plaza Cinema in Gillingham, Kent, as a stopgap measure between the commencement of broadcasting and the completion of Vinters Park. The theatre was quickly converted for television use, ready for the start of broadcasting. The decision to operate a television theatre was against the trend in television at that time, as both the BBC and Thames Television were to dispose of similar facilities in the following two years.

Production at Gillingham was limited; it was used for several quiz shows, and it was the base of the regional afternoon magazine show Not for Women Only while TVS recorded the UK inserts for the first two seasons of Fraggle Rock at that base. TVS sold the theatre in 1988 to an independent production company. For a period afterwards, the site was used for other activities before being demolished to make way for redevelopment. A campaign to have it listed, failed as the large-scale conversion for television production had made it unsuitable for listing.

=== Regional offices ===
TVS maintained small news studios in Brighton, Reading and Poole. Each studio had a single camera and a cut down version of the interview set to enable down-the-line interviews; these centres were each staffed by a news team, consisting of two reporters, a cameraperson, sound recordist and lighting electrician. Each crew had a vehicle equipped with radio-link equipment to enable live location reports via the TVS helicopter. The studios were based in the Brighton Centre, Reading Civic Centre and Poole Arts Centre.

A studio at Westminster was created for parliamentary coverage; TVS had two cameras in the basement studio of the Queen Elizabeth II Centre in Broad Sanctuary, as well as a news crew. This facility was available for hire to other broadcasting organisations, when not needed by TVS. One feature was a remote-control operated camera mounted on the roof of the centre, giving a clear shot of the Houses of Parliament for use as a live backdrop.

In addition, TVS had sales offices in London, which was converted from a former bakery, and Manchester.

== Sub-regions ==
TVS operated a dual region, where the company both offered different services for the South and South East of England. This was primarily a different edition of the flagship Coast to Coast news programme, from a different base and with a different presenting team. However, some other local programming was produced solely for the South or South East and as a result, programming would differ either between sub-regions or pan-regional programmes.

At the beginning of TVS's time as contractor, the company used separate presentation for each sub-region, with a caption declaring the sub-region below the clock, so viewers could differentiate between programmes for the whole region, or for their sub-region. This practice was dropped after a year or so.

== Identity ==
TVS original logo used 1982–1987

Second logo, 1987-1989

TVS's identity featured a six-coloured fleur-de-lis symbol that formed up in three stages from the outside in, before zooming out and sitting alongside the TVS lettering, accompanied by a shortened version of the station theme New Forest Rondo. There were different variations for weekdays and the weekend, which only differed in the zoom-out to the lettering. The ident was shot initially on film of a mechanical model but was later shot using video effects and from 1985, a computer-generated version of the ident was used. Accompanying this ident was a clock on a black background, with the six TVS colours on either side, and an ident sequence following the theme 'For the best view of the South' which was used prior to the news.

On 7 September 1987, following the departure of Dyke from TVS, the station's presentation was completely overhauled, with the new idents designed by John Hayman and a new jingle by composer Ed Welch. The new idents featured metallic TVS lettering which would spin out, turning into a metallic logo before spinning back to the lettering; the rainbow colour effects were still included, when the logo spun. Three versions were produced: a normal ident, a short ident where the TVS logo rotated into the lettering, and a minute-extended ident featuring video from the regions that was used upon start-up and in some of the longer junctions. No clock was included in the new look. The idents were all against a grey gradient background and featured the caption 'Television South' below the end lettering. This change, in effect, brought a more 'corporate' feel to TVS Television.

This ident was altered slightly on 1 September 1989 following the TVS management restructuring, so that the ident was against a gradient blue background and cut in to the rotation of the logo into the lettering. The caption was changed to 'Television' to reflect the station's technical name of TVS Television, and the music was altered slightly to be bolder. Against the blue background, the metallic lettering now had the appearance of glass or perspex. This ident was used by TVS until it went off air on 31 December 1992, when a special ident with the caption 'Thanks for watching' used to close the final TVS programme, Goodbye to All That.

The TVS name and symbol are currently owned by Steve Woodgate, who runs a community television service on the same area TVS originally did, using the same trademark.

== Programming ==
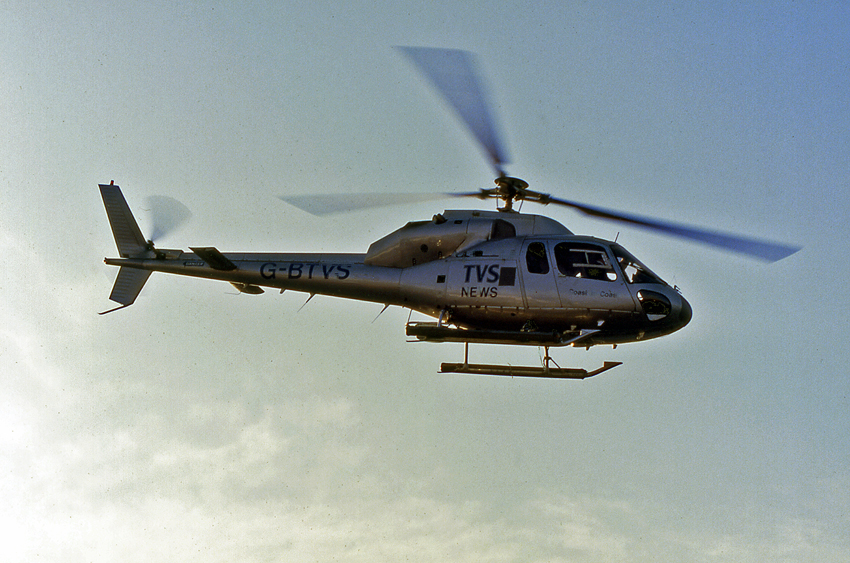
TVS News radio link helicopter

TVS produced a vast array of programming covering a wide aspect of areas. As part of the dual region, two entirely separate editions of the TVS regional news programme Coast to Coast were developed, to produce daily news coverage across the area. Both won the Royal Television Society's awards for the Best News Programme of the Year, in 1983 (for the South East edition), and in 1989 and 1991 (for the South edition).

TVS also innovated with the experimental Afternoon Club, a dedicated programme encompassing a number of afternoon soap operas, quiz shows etc. linked by general chat and guests etc. TVS also produced its own afternoon magazine series, Not for Women Only. TVS was also instrumental in providing separate non-news programmes for the South, South East and Thames Valley areas, including the chat show Coast to Coast People and the listings guide This Way Out. The award-winning series Country Ways, which examined the people and places of the region, began in 1984 and continued in production for ITV Meridian until 2008.

One of TVS's strongest performance was in children's programming. Early successes included the Saturday morning show No. 73 (which launched the career of Sandi Toksvig, and was networked from its second series) On Safari, the British co-production of Fraggle Rock and being one of the biggest contributors to Dramarama. In 1990, TVS brought back How as How 2 and began production of Art Attack.

As TVS established its deal with LWT, the company started to make significant contributions to the network with its own drama and entertainment series including: Catchphrase, C.A.T.S. Eyes, numerous Bobby Davro series, and the successful television adaptations of the novels of Ruth Rendell, with more than 15 programmes being made over a 10-year period.

TVS also provided a number of networked factual and science-based programmes, including In The Mouth of the Dragon and The Real World, the latter of which was twice broadcast in 3D (a ground-breaking television first in the UK) with special glasses given away with the magazine TV Times.

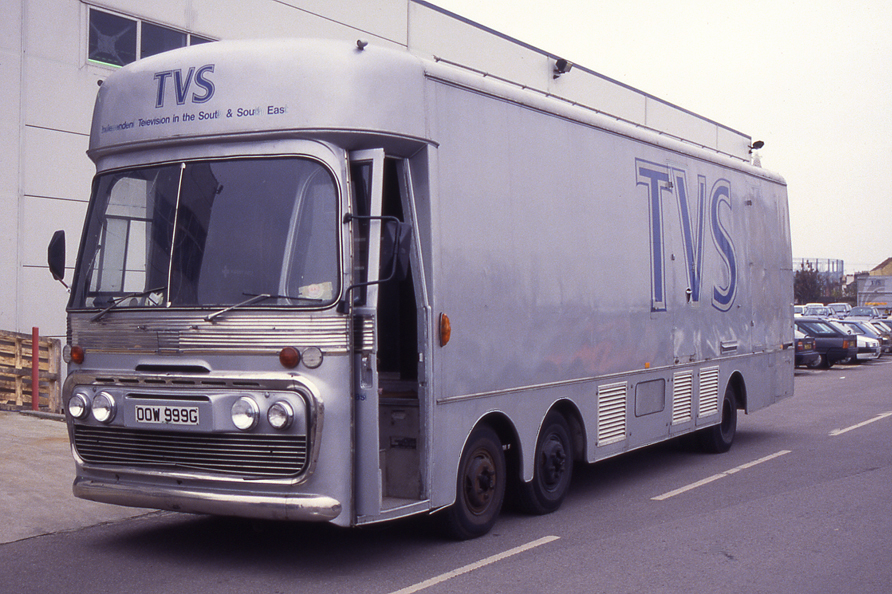
TVS Outside Broadcast mobile control room

TVS continued Southern Television's tradition of providing classical music programmes, but these were broadcast on Channel 4 instead of ITV, principally involving The Bournemouth Symphony Orchestra under conductor Owain Arwel Hughes. Other contributions included opera from Glyndebourne and a performance of Mahler's 8th Symphony from Salisbury Cathedral to inaugurate Channel 4's stereo service on 28 July 1990. As well as classical music, TVS also produced a number of pop and light music programmes.

Other location programming included the usual round of sports coverage in the region, principally football. Also, extensive coverage of the various party political conferences from Brighton and Bournemouth. In the summer, a major light entertainment programme, Summertime Special, was produced for the ITV network on Saturday evenings.

=== Children's ===
- Are We There Yet?
- Art Attack (1990–92)
- The Boy Who Won the Pools (1983)
- The Castle of Adventure (1990)
- Dramarama (1983–89)
- Do It (1984–88)
- Finders Keepers (1991–92)
- Fraggle Rock (UK co-production; 1984–90)
- Get Fresh (1986–88)
- The Haunting of Cassie Palmer (1982)
- Henry's Leg (1986)
- How 2 (1990–92)
- Knights of God (1987)
- Mr Majeika (1988–90)
- Motormouth (1988–92)
- No. 73 (1982–88)
- On Safari (1982–84)
- Panic Station (1988)
- Running Loose (1986–88)
- Rupert (1991)
- Star Kids (1983–85)
- The Storyteller (1988)
- Telebugs (1986–87)
- Travellers By Night (1985)
- TUGS (1989)
- What's Up Doc? (1992)
- The Witches and the Grinnygog (1983)

=== Comedy and entertainment ===
- All Clued Up (1988–91)
- Bobby Davro on the Box (1985–86)
- Bobby Davro's TV Weekly (1987–88)
- Catchphrase (1986–94)
- Challenge of the South (1987)
- Concentration (1988–90)
- Davro's Sketch Pad (1989)
- Davro (1990–91)
- Etcetera
- Five Alive (1987–88)
- Goodbye to All That (1992)
- The Help Squad
- Hitman (1989)
- Inn Quiz (1985)
- It's A Dog's Life (1990)
- Jeopardy! (1990–91)
- Kelly's Eye (1985)
- Love Me, Love Me Not (1988)
- The Parlour Game (1985–87)
- Pop the Question (1986)
- Prove It (1988)
- The Pyramid Game (1989–90)
- Quandaries (1988)
- Richard Digance
- Salute to the Mayflower
- Summertime Special (1986–88)
- The Television Show (1987)
- Tell the Truth (1989–90)
- That's Love (1989–92)
- That's What You Think (1986)
- They Came From Somewhere Else (1984)
- TV Weekly (1989–92)
- Ultra Quiz (1983–85)
- Vintage Quiz (1983–85)
- Worldwise (1985–87)

=== ITV network series contributions ===
- Highway
- Morning Worship
- The Time, The Place

=== Drama ===
- Appointment With Fear: House of Glass (1992)
- The Brief (1984)
- C.A.T.S. Eyes (1985–87)
- Day To Remember (1986)
- The Endless Game (1989)
- Exclusive Yarns (1987)
- Gentlemen and Players (1988–89)
- The Heroes (1989)
- Heroes II: The Return (1991)
- Mandela (1987)
- Michelle Magorian's Back Home (1989)
- Murderers Among Us: The Simon Wiesenthal Story (1989)
- Il Magistrato (1990)
- Perfect Scoundrels (1990–92)
- Radio (1982)
- Rules of Engagement (1989)
- Run For Your Wife (Adaptation of stage play)
- The Ruth Rendell Mysteries (1987–92)
- Secret Weapon (1990)

=== Documentaries and features ===
- 7 Days (1982)
- A Taste of the Country (1992)
- Afternoon Club (1982–84)
- A Full Life (1982–89)
- Agenda (1984–91)
- Airport 90 (1990)
- Arcade (1985–88)
- Artbeat
- Art of the Western World (1989–90)
- An Englishman's Home (1986)
- The Bottom Line (1984)
- About Britain (1982–88)
- Coast to Coast People
- Country Ways (1984–92)
- Enterprise South (1980s)
- Facing South (1985–90)
- Fascinatin' Rhythm
- Farm Focus (1982–89)
- Frocks on the Box / Posh Frocks and New Trousers (1987–90)
- The Human Factor (1984–92)
- Horses for Courses (1986–87)
- An Idea of Europe (1987)
- Just Champion
- Just Williams (1982–85)
- Lymington Cup
- Not For Women Only (1982)
- The Other Side of Me (1982–83)
- Police 5 (1982–92)
- Project Yankee (1987)
- Putting on the South (1984–86)
- Questions (1984–88)
- Regrets
- Steam Sunday (1990)
- Tahiti Witness (1987)
- Tall Ships' Race (1982)
- Taste of the South (1987)
- That's Gardening (1986–92)
- The Boat Show (1983–92)
- The Purple Line (1984)
- The Real World (1982–86)
- The Spirit of Uppark
- This Way Out (1990)
- Ultrasail
- Whitbread Round the World Race
- Writers on Writing (1983–87)

=== Music ===
- Action for Drugs Concert
- The Barber of Seville (Glyndebourne)
- DJ
- Fidelio (Glyndebourne)
- Il Seraglio (Glyndebourne)
- La Traviata (Glyndebourne)
- Just Liz (Liz Robertson)
- The Love of Three Oranges (Glyndebourne)
- The Magic Flute (Glyndebourne)
- Mary O'Hara
- A Midsummer Night's Dream (Glyndebourne)
- Mahler's 8th Symphony (for Channel 4)
- Off The Record
- Royal Gala Performance (for New Zealand television)
- Poole Promenade Concerts

== See also ==
- Southern Television
- ITV Meridian
- ITV (TV network)
- History of ITV

ITV regional service
Preceded by Southern Television	South & South East England; 1 January 1982 – 31 December 1992	Succeeded by Meridian Broadcasting
