= No. 73 =

British children's television series (1982–1988)

- Door to the No. 73 house as featured in opening credits
- Genre: Children's; Entertainment
- Created by: John Dale
- Directed by: Nigel Pickard; Michael Kerrigan; Mike Adams; Janie Grace; Alistair Clark
- Presented by: Sandi Toksvig; Neil Buchanan
- Starring: Andrea Arnold; Nick Staverson; Kim Goody; Patrick Doyle; Jeannie Crowther; Richard Addison; Tony Aitken; Tony English; Nick Wilton; Tony Hippolyte; Michael Maynard; Kate Copstick; Julian Callaghan; Nadia de Lemeny; Richard Waites; Robert Debenham; Jo Connor; David Rubin; Tessa Morton; Frank Sidebottom
- Country of origin: United Kingdom
- Original language: English
- No. of series: 8
- No. of episodes: 189

Production
- Executive producers: Richard Leyland; Anna Home; J. Nigel Pickard; Janie Grace; John Dale
- Producers: John Dale; J. Nigel Pickard; Jeff Dowson; Tim Edmunds
- Production locations: Television Centre, Southampton (Series 1-2); TVS Television Theatre, Gillingham (Series 2); TVS Television Centre, Maidstone (Series 3-8 & 7T3)
- Production company: TVS

Original release
- Network: ITV
- Release: 2 January 1982 – 27 March 1988

No 73, later retitled 7T3, is a British 1980s children's TV show produced by TVS for the ITV network. It was broadcast live on Saturday mornings and ran from 2 January 1982 to 27 March 1988. The show had an ensemble cast including Sandi Toksvig, Neil Buchanan, Patrick Doyle, Andrea Arnold, Kim Goody and Kate Copstick.

When TVS won the contract to provide ITV coverage for the South of England in 1980, the first thing they set up was a children's department. A team put together with a background in theatre and drama soon decided to produce a Saturday morning show that differed from the usual Tiswas and Saturday Superstore formula: this show would feature actors in character as hosts, performing their own comedic storyline around the usual guests, music videos, competitions and cartoons. Much of the show was improvised and a whole week of rehearsals plus an extensive dress rehearsal on Friday preceded each live broadcast on Saturday morning.

== Timeline ==
The first two series were broadcast from Southampton to the TVS region only. From Series 3, production moved to TVS's studios in Maidstone (now the Maidstone Studios) and the show was broadcast nationwide.

=== Series 1 ===
Ethel Davis (Sandi Toksvig), an eccentric old lady who progressively got younger as the show went on, owned the house.

Harry Stern (Nick Staverson) was introduced as her bumbling nephew who aspired for international stardom. He ran a market stall with his dim-witted (and unseen) friend Trevor.

Dawn Lodge (Andrea Arnold), the roller-boot-wearing female lodger, worked at the local veterinary surgery - the local vet being internationally renowned zoo vet David Taylor, who would bring various animals to the house throughout the show's run for the requisite animal spot, which would mainly be presented with Dawn (or another character if Dawn was busy or absent).

Most eccentric of all, Patrick Doyle appeared as Percy Simmonds, inventor and love interest to Ethel. Percy invented the 2-in-1 Coffee Percolator and Film Projector from which the cartoons such as Disney, Looney Tunes or Roger Ramjet, or pre-filmed inserts would be shown, and the Two-Way Video Microwave Oven which would show video inserts or live linkups.

The house would also be visited each week by local children. In the first two series these would be children from local primary or secondary schools, but would later be limited to students from drama classes at local secondary schools. The children stopped appearing on a regular basis after Series 4.

Throughout the first half of the series, Ethel and Dawn would have caricatures sent to the from a "secret admirer". This admirer was revealed in Episode 4 to be Neil Buchanan, an artist (and former rock guitarist) who posted himself to the house through Red Star Parcels and would appear intermittently for the first couple of series to present art-based items.

Musical artists would appear as having slept in the lounge which they would use as a rehearsal space. Later in the episode, and during the closing credits, they would perform live. The first band to appear was The Q-Tips performing "S.Y.S.L.J.F.M. (The Letter Song)"

Each episode ended with Ethel hosting the Sandwich Quiz, a madcap-general knowledge game pitting two of that week's guests against each other, the winner of which would receive the Golden Loaf Trophy.

=== Series 2 ===
This series introduced Kim Goody to the show as a performer at the TVS Television Theatre in Gillingham, where Percy held a job as handyman. Ethel could link up to Gillingham from the house in Southampton via the Two-Way Video Microwave Oven.

Neighbours Martin and Hazel Edwards (Richard Addison and Jeannie Crowther) from No.75 also started to figure into the storyline, usually with Martin being at odds with Ethel, and Hazel being more sympathetic towards the neighbours. The pair would increasingly participate in items during the show and occasionally host the phone-in.

Local spiv Tony Deal (Nick Wilton) also made his first appearances in this series.

=== Series 3 ===
This series was the first to come from the Maidstone studios, requiring a change in the address and telephone numbers for viewers to interact with the show.

Percy Simmonds was replaced by a Scotsman called Alec Simmonds, also played by Patrick Doyle, allowing him to speak with his own accent. Viewers who wrote in noticing the resemblance between the two were told that Alec was Percy's Scottish cousin. There was another new semi-regular character called Fred the Postman (Tony Aitken) who embarked on an on-off relationship with Ethel throughout the next couple of series.

Neil also became a semi-regular in this series, regularly making the trip down from Liverpool before eventually moving into a caravan down the road from the house.

In this series, Ethel and the resident inventor, Tony English, created the Hover Cupboard and later tested it out at sea travelling from Southampton to Cowes on the Isle of Wight.

The series ended with Ethel going on holiday to France with Alec and Fred the Postman, while Harry and Kim went off on a tandem, and Martin and Hazel agreeing to look after the house while everyone was away. Alec would not return for the following series.

=== Series 4 ===
Eazi Target (Tony Hippolyte) – Ethel's friend from her days at the paper - became a semi-regular visitor to the house. Ethel ran in the local election to stand as an independent councillor, leading to Martin running against her, but both were beaten by Tony Deal. Former pentathlete Kathy Tayler also dropped by to present sports-related items.

Ethel reveals that she, Harry, Neil, Dawn and Hazel have been renovating the cellar under the stairs for use by bands to rehearse, with the bands' performances now taking place there rather than in the lounge or the back yard. The first artist to appear in the cellar was Nik Kershaw performing his then current single "Dancing Girls".

Episode 7 saw Ethel absent for the first time, leaving Dawn, Neil, Hazel and Kim to hold the fort, but also drafting in David "Kid" Jensen to help around the house and Tony Deal to keep everyone in order and host the Sandwich Quiz. The second time Ethel was away this series saw Dawn host the Sandwich Quiz.

This series saw former policeman Colin Daly, complete with a Sherlock Holmes-style deerstalker hat and his bloodhound Tracker, hold the first of his Supersleuth competition over several episodes. Shaw Taylor also popped by to assist with the competition. The grand final was held in the lounge of No.73 during the final episode of Series 4 with the finalists answering questions delivered by Shaw about the happenings of that episode, with the 4 children who got the most correct answers in each age and gender categories (boy and girl, ages 11–13 and 14–16) winning the grand prize of a trip to New York.

Poet Roger McGough also made regular visits to compile the No.73 Novel Novel, a novella telling a story about Ethel. While Roger wrote the first and final chapters, he invited viewers throughout the series to write the following chapters which must contain exactly 73 words, with the best entry read out each week by Roger, one of the residents or one of the guests.

The series also saw the Matchbox competition to see who could fit the most individual items - except matches - into a matchbox. The winner somehow managed to fit 73 items into their matchbox and won 73 seconds to cram as many prizes from the kitchen as they could into a giant matchbox, including the Sandwich Quiz Golden Loaf trophy and the shirt Harry was wearing.

The series finale also saw Ethel at odds with her bank manager Frederick Crossfield (Michael Maynard), who sends bailiffs round to the house to repossess the furniture. The episode ended with Ethel, Harry, Dawn, Neil, Martin, Hazel and Fred barricading the front door.

=== Series 5 ===
Ethel turned the house into a bed and breakfast, leading to comedic storylines while getting the house up to standard, such as installing a sink in every room - including the cellar, and Harry leading the fire drills leading to Fred the Postman having several accidents.

Whenever Ethel was away in this and the following series, Neil would present the Sandwich Quiz, but renamed in honour of his Liverpudlian roots to The Chip Butty Quiz.

Colin Daly returned with the second Supersleuth competition, with the winners this time going to San Francisco. The final was held halfway through the series, with Daly appearing one more time towards the end of the series to show picture highlights of the trip. After this, Daly would move his Supersleuth competition over to Thames Television's magazine show Splash!

Meanwhile, Dawn had her roller boots spray painted by Paul King (as per King's music video "Love and Pride").

While Fred and Eazi left the series after failing to start a radio station in the backyard shed (aptly named "Radio Shed"), Ethel fell in love with her most unlikely suitor yet, bank manager Frederick Crossfield. The courtship lasted two episodes, with the series finale leading up to the wedding and a cliffhanger. The finale had the most guests in any episode of the show - Five Star, Junior, King, Bucks Fizz, Jimmy Nail and Matthew Kelly, with The Redskins performing in the cellar.

=== Series 6 ===
It turned out the wedding between Ethel and Frederick was cancelled by mutual agreement at the very last moment.

There was no new Front Door Production in Series 6. Instead, Ethel put on a treasure hunt for Neil and Kim across three counties to win the box room key. Kim won, but ended up sharing the room with Dawn, while Neil bunked up with Harry. By the end of the series the two rivals had fallen in love. The series also saw Harry start a new job as a singing telegram, requiring him to wear all kinds of ridiculous outfits from gorilla suits to a Tarzan loincloth.

Tony Deal appeared for the final time in two memorable episodes, first on the run from the police, and then trying to lure the guest to No.75 with Martin Edwards. Papier-mâché headed performer Frank Sidebottom made his first appearance during this series; he would make several further appearances throughout the next couple of series. Another memorable episode saw Ethel, Harry, Kim, Hazel and Martin mount a truncated performance of The Pirates of Penzance throughout the house.

This series also saw the first outside broadcast episode coming from the Kent seaside town of Broadstairs. It was themed as a whodunnit guest starring Shaw Taylor in his Police 5 persona trying to catch a villain called The Jewelled Hand.

=== Series 7 ===
It was revealed in passing that Ethel had emigrated to Australia to live with her cousin, leaving Harry, Dawn, Neil and Kim collectively in charge. The Sandwich Quiz was replaced by the 'Duster Muster', the winner of which won the Golden Mop trophy while the loser had to clean the house on Saturday afternoon. There was also a new Front Door serial, spoofing The A-Team, called "The Z-Team".

Former Copy Cats cast member Andrew O'Connor moved in, while Scottish housekeeper Maisie McConachie (Kate Copstick) became the new resident klutz. The housemates were also joined by S.A.M.A.N.T.H.A. Telebug (voiced by Kate Copstick) who spent a lot of time trying to find a suitor among the appliances in the house. Martin also introduced his nerdy nephew Geoffrey (Nicolas Barnes) who got on with S.A.M.A.N.T.H.A., but none of these characters stuck around for the next series.

At the end of November the gang started introducing a line-up of children's programmes on Sunday morning, which developed into Sunday at 73 by January. This was a shorter, less elaborate version of the show, with fewer guests and more breaks for cartoons and The Adventures of Black Beauty.

On 7 March 1987, the day after the sinking of the Herald of Free Enterprise, when breaking off during an outside broadcast episode from Camber Sands for a news report on the disaster, a humorous caption read "sea you later", unwittingly giving the impression of callousness.

As the series progressed, the new and evil landlord J.C. Birch (Bill Stewart) started threatening to demolish not only No 73, but the entire neighbourhood and replace them with luxury flats.

The series finale saw the regulars preparing a birthday party for David Taylor, but the bathroom floor starts to collapse into the lounge while Neil takes a bath and a burst water main leads to Martin, who had been on the verge of a breakdown and had returned from a positive thinking course, taking a shower in the lounge as a result. S.A.M.A.N.T.H.A. also leaves the house to elope with Nigel the air dryer. Hazel sends Martin for building materials to fix the ceiling while the others hold David's birthday party in the kitchen, but Martin crashes the van into the front door.

=== Series 8 ===
Following the events from the previous series, the front door and window were boarded up, though the door was eventually restored. It is mentioned in passing that Martin and Hazel left No.75 and moved to Suffolk. The eccentric driving instructor Hamilton Dent (Richard Waites) would move into No.75 as a result. Harry premiered his latest and last film epic, "From Flusher with Love". The "Duster Muster" quiz was replaced with "The Game", which was a Pictionary-style game that saw two guests drawing items described on the cards given by one of the cast members acting as adjudicator, and two of the cast guessing what was being drawn within a time limit.

More new characters moved in, including slovenly Julian Callaghan, spoilt American Nadia De Lemeny and the acrobatic David Rubin (though David's stay at No.73 would come to an end in November). J.C. Birch sent his lawyer, James Squire (Chris Donat) to the house to deal with the residents, though he had a soft spot for Dawn and the pair embarked on a relationship which ended when Squire handed the housemates their eviction notice. Neil's Scouse friend Jo Connor also popped in from time to time. Harry also had a posh girlfriend called Philippa (Tessa Morton). Birch would finally sent a builder to carry out repairs on the house in the form of Rob "The Builder" Debenham, who turned out to be an out of work actor moonlighting as a builder. However, this wouldn't stop the deterioration of the house as the bathroom finally collapsed into the lounge, and Hamilton made a large hole in the stairs during an irate phone call with his mother, falling into the cellar as a result.

J.C. Birch finally saw fit to tear down the entire street for redevelopment and evict all from No.73 shortly after Christmas. They moved into a Wild West theme park in January, and from then on the show was renamed 7T3. This development saw the cast move into the saloon, with the numbers 7 and 3 painted on each saloon door, and a brass fixtures forming the shape of a 'T' when closed, hence the new title, and had them run around a mock Western town (in winter) with the same guests, items and storylines. In reality, this was an outdoor set built on the former netball courts at the Maidstone studios, with the saloon, reception, office and kitchen being interior sets. The musical artists now performed in the saloon.

== Front Door Productions ==
Front Door Productions was a fictional production company located in Maidstone, Kent and founded by Ethel Davis (Sandi Toksvig) in January 1985 to produce serials in five to six parts starring herself and all the regulars from the Saturday morning children's variety programme No 73. Local shop keeper Mr Pattels gave the residents of No 73 a special offer on developing their Super 8 home movies, and even went to the trouble of editing the scenes together. Ethel and the rest made all the costumes, built all the sets and played every part.

In reality of course, TVS Television provided the sets and costumes, while Sandi Toksvig and Nick Symons wrote the pun-infested scripts. The regulars did play every part though. There were five major Front Door Productions, all of which can only be described as 'spoofs'. Broadcast as part of No 73's Saturday morning line-up, the 1985 season featured three in a row, while the two following years only had one each.

=== "The Sands Of Thyme" ===
This first production starred Ethel (Sandi Toksvig), Harry (Nick Staverson), Dawn (Andrea Arnold) and Alec (Patrick Doyle). Originally broadcast near the end of the series 3.

=== "Ricochet" ===
(21 May 1984 – 9 June 1984) Series 4 saw the broadcast of a "Spaghetti Western" filmed at Frontier City, Hungerford. Harry played, among others, the title role "Rick O Shea". All other speaking parts were played by Ethel, Dawn and Fred the Postman (Tony Aitken). Shown in five parts.

=== "Roman Around" ===
(2 February 1985 – 9 March 1985) The 1985 series featured three different Front Door Productions. The first starred Ethel (Sandi Toksvig), Harry (Nick Staverson), Dawn (Andrea Arnold) and Neil (Neil Buchanan) in an epic set in 15th century England (but filmed in Hever Castle, Kent). Between the four of them they played up to 34 different parts.

=== "How many for dinner?" ===
Having missed out of the first production, three other prominent members of the revolving No 73 cast joined Ethel in a 1920s murder mystery inspired by, if not exactly written by Agatha Christie. Ethel, Martin (Richard Addison), Hazel (Jeannie Crowther) and Fred (Tony Aitken) divided all speaking parts between them, though they started off with considerably fewer characters than the Roman production, and the cast-list predictably grew slimmer by the episode.

=== "The Three Musketeers" ===
(1 June 1985 – 29 June 1985) An extremely loose adaptation of the Alexandre Dumas novel, Ethel, Tony Deal (Nick Wilton) and Eazi (Tony Hippolyte) starred as the titular musketeers Athos, Bathos and Pathos, as well as every other character (though some of the horses were not portrayed by them). This five-parter was shown over the last five episodes of the fifth series, and with three serials to one series, every cast member except for Kim Goody got a chance to show his or her versatility (and almost all of them had to play different sexes at one point or another).

=== "The Z-Team" ===
(20 September 1986 – 25 October 1986) A parody of the contemporary action-adventure series The A-Team. Convicted as toddlers of a crime they did not commit, Corporal Tom 'Cannibal' Stiff (Neil), Dimpleton 'Skates' Wreck (Dawn), Marginally Mental Murky (Kim) and Mr. P as B.A. Brat (Harry) are still on the run from the Parks Department. Police 5's Shaw Taylor appeared in the first and last chapter as kidnap victim of the evil Pirates (also played by Neil, Dawn, Kim and Harry). Both teams were hunted (for different reasons) by Agent Perkus (Martin) and social worker Mrs Goose (Hazel). In the finale it was revealed that Perkus and Goose were actually the parents of both the Z-Team and the Pirates.

=== "From Flusher with love" ===
(3 October 1987 – 7 November 1987) Written and directed by Harry and starring Dawn as a female spy called Janice Bond (agent 0073). This Bond took her orders from 'Erm' as opposed to 'M', who had a male secretary called Spendapenny. Gadgets were provided by 'Cue'. A love interest was provided in the form of American counterpart Aaron Dreck. Harry himself appeared as Tony Toogood.

== Transmissions ==
Series	Start date	End date	Episodes
1	2 January 1982	20 February 1982	8
2	5 June 1982	28 August 1982	13
3	7 May 1983	13 August 1983	15
4	28 April 1984	28 July 1984	14
5	2 February 1985	29 June 1985	21
6	11 January 1986	26 April 1986	15
7	20 September 1986	12 April 1987	46
8	5 September 1987	27 March 1988	57
