= Art Attack =

British children's television series

- Genre: Arts & Crafts; Children's television series
- Created by: Neil Buchanan; Tim Edmunds
- Directed by: Tim Edmunds; Nick Bigsby; Jeremy Cross; Peter Eyre; Claire Michel; Richard Bradley; Jeremy Swan; Fernando Berreta
- Presented by: Neil Buchanan; Jassa Ahluwalia; Lloyd Warbey
- Theme music composer: Mr. Miller & Mr. Porter
- Opening theme: "Art Attack"
- Ending theme: "Art Attack"
- Country of origin: United Kingdom
- Original language: English
- No. of series: CITV: 19 (1990–2007) (Spin-off series) (1996–97, 2003); Disney Junior: 4 (2011–2015)
- No. of episodes: Original: 301 (5 Christmas specials 1994–97, 2003-05) (25 episodes from spinoff series: 1996–97, 2003); Revival: 97

Production
- Executive producers: Neil Buchanan; Tim Edmunds; J Nigel Pickard (ITV1); Sandy Ross (ITV1); Elizabeth Partyka (SMG); Adrian Edwards (ITV1)
- Producers: Tim Edmunds; Helen Dawson; Thomas Sheard; Nic Ayling; Louise Lamb
- Production locations: Maidstone, Kent (CITV); Southampton (CITV); Buenos Aires, Argentina (Disney Junior)
- Running time: 15 minutes (Series 1–6); 20 minutes (Series 7–19)
- Production companies: TVS (1990–1992); The Media Merchants (1993–2007); SMG Productions (1993–2007) (Note: Known as "Scottish Television Enterprises" from season 5 until season 12); The Walt Disney Company (2011–2015)

Original release
- Network: ITV1 (CITV)
- Release: 15 June 1990 – 19 May 2007
- Network: Disney Junior
- Release: 30 May 2011 – 12 June 2015

Art Attack is a British children's television programme revolving around art, originally hosted by Neil Buchanan on CITV from 1990 to 2007, and subsequently hosted by Lloyd Warbey on Disney Junior from 2012 to 2015.

The original programme aired on CITV between 15 June 1990 and 19 May 2007, and was presented by one of its creators, Neil Buchanan, throughout. Buchanan also wrote and produced the programme, and came up with a majority of the creative ideas.

A new series launched on Disney Junior on 6 June 2011 and was presented by Jassa Ahluwalia. Each show involved Ahluwalia voicing-over footage of an artist producing three works of art, taking the viewer through the various stages of production step by step. Ahluwalia was later replaced with Lloyd Warbey at the start of the British second revived series.

== History ==
The programme was originally a TVS production, devised by two TVS employees, Neil Buchanan and Tim Edmunds. Buchanan and Edmunds met each other at Southern Television in 1982, and worked together on No. 73 and Do It!.

The first Art Attacks were a strand within No. 73, and this segment proved so popular, Nigel Pickard, the executive producer of children's programming at TVS, green-lit the pilot. The Art Attack pilot was shot on location at a disused swimming pool in Gillingham, Kent in 1989, and the series began the following year.

Throughout its run, the series used theme-music composed by Mr Miller & Mr Porter, and inspired at Buchanan's suggestion by the hit Kenny Loggins song Danger Zone, from the 1986 film Top Gun.

When TVS lost its franchise, Edmunds and Buchanan bought the rights to the show and produced Art Attack through their company, The Media Merchants. The Media Merchants used STV Studios (then known as "SMG Productions"), as the ITV company to get the series onto the network: this was partly due to the fact that Nigel Pickard had moved to Scottish Television. In 1993, another ex-TVS employee, Peter Urie, set up a production management company, Television Support Services. Television Support Services managed and co-wrote all the Media Merchants productions.

For most of its run, the show was filmed at The Maidstone Studios, Maidstone, Kent. In 1998, The Media Merchants signed a production deal with Disney's Buena Vista Productions to produce a series of 104 episodes for Germany, France, Italy, and Spain, 26 each, and were branded under the Disney umbrella. These versions were recorded at Maidstone but on a smaller set than the original UK versions and mostly utilized stock footage from it. The respective local hosts displayed the artwork in between stages and explained what to do next, while footage of Buchanan's hands producing the artwork was used. As such, his Big Art Attacks were also retained, as was The Head, dubbed over by relevant local voice artists. The Disney deal was expanded in April 2000 with an additional forty episodes for Latin America and Brazil, split into twenty episodes each and an additional set of episodes in March 2002.

In March 2000, The Britt Allcroft Company (later Gullane Entertainment) purchased The Media Merchants for £14 million, with the series changing hands under corporate ownership for the first time. The show later went under a larger company, HIT Entertainment, after they purchased Gullane in September 2002. Despite the new ownership, the show continued to be produced under The Media Merchants.

In June 2006, ITV announced the closure of its in-house children's production unit and implemented a commissioning freeze, leading to some CITV shows being discontinued. Art Attack was one of the affected shows, with ITV announcing the show's cancellation in July 2007. Repeats of the show continued to broadcast on CITV until 30 May 2011, usually on weekend afternoons. HIT Entertainment closed down The Media Merchants after the cancellation, and the production team moved to The Foundation, producing the fifth series of Finger Tips and Mister Maker, which were both also recorded at The Maidstone Studios.

In November 2008, HIT Entertainment announced a new partnership with The Walt Disney Company Latin America to revive the Latin American version of the series. This revamped version would be produced in Argentina at the Non Stop Digital S.A. studios in Buenos Aires. In May 2011, Disney announced that the other international versions, including the UK, would also be revived; also announcing that they had purchased the property from HIT. These revived versions were formatted similar to the other Disney versions, where the local presenter (Jassa Ahluwalia for the UK version's first season) would narrate over footage of an artist creating the artwork. Local artist Alexiev Gandman was brought in to create the Big Art Attacks. The Head was replaced with a new character named Vincent Van Coconut, who was a talking palm tree. The revival was produced for Disney Junior, targeted towards a preschool audience. Makes based on Disney characters or franchises were also common in this version.

In December 2012, Buchanan was featured in a segment dedicated to the programme's original run in the one-off documentary special 30 Years of CITV: a 1992 episode was broadcast on the CITV channel shortly after the above was broadcast, as part of its "Old Skool Weekend" marathon.

A spin-off reality show, Art Attack: Modo desafío, was produced in Latin America for Disney+ in 2023.

== Characters ==
"The Head" was a puppet stone bust, based on Constantine the Great, who would humorously recap the steps needed to produce the last art piece made. After doing this, he would usually show his own creation of the previous Art Attack, most times however getting it comically wrong to his own sorrow or annoyance. However, on occasion, by accidentally doing part of the instructions incorrectly, he would create a different effect to that desired and be proud of his work. At other times he would tell jokes or make puns, particularly after the Big Art Attacks. In series 1, "The Head" was played by Jim Sweeney; in series 2, Andrew O'Connor; from series 3, having been redesigned as a puppet, he was voiced and operated by Francis Wright. "The Head" did not appear in series 12 and 13, or in series 18 and 19.

In the revived series, The Head was replaced with a talking palm tree called "Vincent van Coconut", voiced by Tim Hibber. The name is a parody of Dutch painter Vincent van Gogh.

== Series overview ==
=== Original series (1990–2007) ===
Art Attack original series seasons
Series	Episodes	Episode length	Originally released	
Series	Episodes	Episode length	First released	Last released
1	7	15 min	15 June 1990	27 July 1990
2	7	15 min	1 April 1991	13 May 1991
3	7	15 min	17 March 1992	12 May 1992
4	7	15 min	17 September 1992	22 October 1992
5	7	15 min	7 May 1993	25 June 1993
6	10	15 min	14 February 1994	14 March 1994
7	10	20 min	9 January 1995	13 March 1995
8	10	20 min	8 January 1996	11 March 1996
9	12	20 min	6 January 1997	17 March 1997
10	13	20 min	12 January 1998	30 March 1998
11	16	20 min	7 September 1998	14 December 1998
12	30 (Note: Two episodes aired each week during seasons 12 and 13)	15 min	6 September 1999	13 December 1999
13	30	15 min	4 September 2000	18 December 2000
14	20 (Note: Five episodes aired each week during season 14)	20 min	5 November 2001	30 November 2001
15	15	20 min	9 September 2002	23 December 2002
16	15	20 min	10 September 2003	17 December 2003
17	18	20 min	30 August 2004	13 December 2004
18	26	20 min	26 September 2005	12 December 2005
19	26	20 min	16 October 2006	19 May 2007

==== Christmas specials ====
No.	Original release date	Episode Length
1	13 December 1994	20 mins
2	12 December 1995	20 mins
3	18 December 1996	20 mins
4	17 December 1997	20 mins
5	22 December 2003	20 mins
6	21 December 2005	20 mins

==== Other ====
Art Attack special seasons
Series	Episodes	Episode length	Originally released	
Series	Episodes	Episode length	First released	Last released
Best of Art Attack	2	20 mins	23 August 1996	30 August 1996
Art Attack Scrapbook	8	20 mins	22 October 1997	10 December 1997
Art Attack: Mini-Makes	15	5 mins	31 August 2003	7 December 2003

=== Revived series (2011–2015) ===
Art Attack revived series seasons
Series	Episodes	Episode length	Originally released	
Series	Episodes	Episode length	First released	Last released
1	26	23:30	30 May 2011	28 November 2011
2	21	23:30	25 June 2012	29 October 2012
3	24	23:30	1 July 2013	14 November 2014
4	26	23:30	9 January 2015	12 June 2015

(Source: ITV/Hit Entertainment/BFI/Disney)

== Video releases ==
VHS video title	Year of release	Company	Video specials
Art Attack: Over 30 Great Art and Craft Ideas	1992	Future Vision	Neil shows his favourite craft ideas for Art Attacks on the first series.
Art Attack with Neil Buchanan	1993	Video Class	Neil shows his 16 favourite Art Attacks.
Art Attack: Most Wanted	26 February 1996	Contender Entertainment Group	Neil shows a selection of the Art Attacks most requested by fans.
Art Attack: Crazy Cartoons and Dazzling Drawings	29 July 1996	Contender Entertainment Group	Neil shows his tips for drawing cartoons and pictures.
Art Attack Let's Party!	28 October 1996	Contender Entertainment Group	Neil shows examples of his Art Attacks for parties, birthdays and Christmas.
Art Attack: Top 20	10 February 1997	Contender Entertainment Group	Neil shows his own 20 favourite Art Attacks.
Art Attack: Scrapbook	3 November 1997	Contender Entertainment Group	Neil shows his scrapbook with another selection of the best Art Attacks.
Art Attack: 10 of the Best	16 February 1998	Contender Entertainment Group	Neil celebrates 10 of the best Art Attacks from the first 10 series.
Art Attack: Christmas Cracker	26 October 1998	Contender Entertainment Group	Neil shows five Art Attacks to make and do, plus two Big Art Attacks, from the Christmas Specials.
Art Attack: Greatest Tips and Tricks	20 September 1999	Contender Entertainment Group	Neil shows a selection of Art Attacks that exemplify his best tips and tricks.
Art Attack: How to Draw	5 June 2000	Contender Entertainment Group	Neil shows how to do some drawing – the Art Attack way.
Art Attack: How to Paint	11 September 2000	Contender Entertainment Group	Neil shows how to do different kinds of painting – the Art Attack way.
Art Attack: Make 'n' Do	4 June 2001	Contender Entertainment Group	Neil shows how to make things made out of old rubbish.
Art Attack Monsters and other Scary Stuff	19 August 2002	Video Collection International	Neil shows some of his best monster-based Art Attacks.

No DVD releases have been issued in the UK, except DVDs bundled with Art Attack books and DVDs which came free with newspapers. In India, Art Attack was released in three volumes by Disney DVD in 2010.

Many Art Attack books were also released by Dorling Kindersley.

== International broadcast ==
Disney Channel and its various offshoots have broadcast Art Attack in most territories since the late 1990s, producing localised versions of the programme for many countries. In Australia, it was broadcast on ABC from July 1995 to October 1999; later episodes were broadcast on Disney Channel, with the revived series being broadcast on Disney Junior and on various channels of the Seven Network. In Canada, the programme has aired variously on TVOKids, Family Jr. and Knowledge Kids; in the United States, it was broadcast on WAM! during the 1990s. Art Attack has also aired in several other countries such as SABC2 in South Africa, ZBC in Zimbabwe, StarHub and Disney Channel in Singapore, TVB in Hong Kong, KTN in Kenya, Channel 33 in the United Arab Emirates, Fun Channel and Disney Channel in the Middle East and RTB in Brunei.

The original series, hosted by Neil Buchanan, has also been dubbed or subtitled in various non-English speaking countries, having been broadcast in various forms by Dragon Club in China, ET1 in Greece, Disney Channel in Taiwan and TRT in Turkey; in the Middle East, the Turkish version of the revived series has been subtitled into Arabic and broadcast by Jeem TV. In much of Latin America, the programme was broadcast on Discovery Kids during the 1990s, dubbed into Spanish and Portuguese. From 2000 to 2002, localised versions in Spanish and Portuguese were produced by Disney, which aired on Disney Channel Latin America and Disney Channel (Brazil). respectively, and hosted by Rui Torres; in later years, the British version was dubbed and broadcast by Disney in these territories. The Disney Channel (Portugal) version was hosted by Pedro Penim from 2002 to 2011, and Salvador Nery from 2011 to 2014. A Hindi version has been produced for India from 2011 to 2014, hosted by Gaurav Juyal; previously, the UK version was aired, dubbed in Hindi. A Scandinavian version of the program, hosted by Leon Jilber and produced in Swedish (with Danish and Norwegian dubs also available) initially aired on the Scandinavian version of Disney Junior, but has since moved to Disney Channel Scandinavia. An Italian version has been produced for Italy from 1998 to 2005 and from 2011 to 2014, hosted by Giovanni Muciaccia.

The series was also broadcast on armed forces television on BFBS (which broadcasts thousands of television series and films from the UK as well as a number of television series and films other countries) and its defunct channel SSVC Television (which went from 1982 to 1997) as part of their children's blocks Room 785 and Children's SSVC. The channels have aired the show in a number of countries including Germany, Cyprus, Bosnia and Herzegovina, Gibraltar, Belize and Falkland Islands.

== See also ==
- SMart – another children's art television show, aired from 1994 to 2009.
- Art Ninja – another children's art television show aired since 2015.
