= Jump =

Jump most commonly refers to jumping, a form of movement in which an organism propels itself into the air.

Jump or jumping may also refer to:

== Arts and media ==
=== Books ===
- Jump! (novel), a 2010 novel by Jilly Cooper

=== Film ===
- Jump (1999 film), a 1999 film featuring James LeGros, Mark Rosenthal and Jessica Hecht
- Jump (2009 film), a 2009 Hong Kong comedy-drama film
- Jump (2012 film), a 2012 Northern Irish film
- Jump! (2007 film), a film featuring Patrick Swayze and Martine McCutcheon
- Jump! (2023 film), a Spanish science fiction comedy film
- Jumping (film), a 1986 Belgian film
- Jump In!, a 2007 Disney Channel film
- Jump cut, a technique used in film editing
- The Jump (2020 film), a 2020 Lithuanian documentary film

=== Television ===
- Jump! (TV series), a Singaporean Chinese drama
- "Jump" (ALF), a 1986 television episode
- "Jump" (Ugly Betty), a 2008 television episode
- "Jumping", an episode of the television series Teletubbies
- The Jump (1998 TV series), British crime drama
- The Jump (2014 TV series), British television series that follows celebrities as they tried to master various winter sports
- The Jump (talk show), basketball talk show (2016–2021)

=== Music ===
- Jump blues, a musical genre
- Jump Incorporated, an Australian rock band
- Jump Records, a record label
- Jumpstyle, a genre in electronic music
- Jump or Jump, Little Children, an American indie rock band
- Jamshid "Jumps" Khadiwhala, turntablist for The Cat Empire
- The Jump (podcast), a music podcast hosted by Shirley Manson

==== Albums ====
- Jump (Djumbo album) (2005)
- Jump (Jimmy Ponder album) (1989)
- Jump! (album), by Van Dyke Parks (1984)
- Jumping (EP), by Kara (2010)

==== Songs ====
- "Jump" (Blackpink song) (2025)
- "Jump" (Every Little Thing song) (2001)
- "Jump" (Flo Rida song) with Nelly Furtado (2009)
- "Jump" (Lil Durk song) with King Von, Booka600, and Memo600 (2021)
- "Jump" (Nadav Guedj song) (2015)
- "Jump" (David Guetta and Glowinthedark song) (2019)
- "Jump" (Kris Kross song) (1992)
- "Jump" (Madonna song) (2005)
- "Jump" (Rihanna song) (2012)
- "Jump" (Tyla, Gunna and Skillibeng song) (2024)
- "Jump" (Van Halen song) (1983)
- "Jump (For My Love)", by the Pointer Sisters (1984)
- "Jump, Jump", a single by DJ Tomekk (2005)
- "Jumpin'" (Liberty X song) (2003)
- "Jumpin" (NLE Choppa song) (2021)
- "Jumping" (Kara song) (2010)
- "Jumpin' Jumpin'", by Destiny's Child (1999)
- "Jump", by Gary Barlow from Since I Saw You Last (2013)
- "Jump", by Black Eyed Peas from Elevation (2022)
- "Jump", by Dababy from Blame It on Baby (2020)
- "Jump", by the Faders (2005)
- "Jump", by Claire Hamill from Touchpaper (1984)
- "Jump", by Loverboy from Get Lucky (1981)
- "Jump", by MadeinTYO from Sincerely, Tokyo (2018)
- "Jump", by Major Lazer from Know No Better (2017)
- "Jump", by Kylie Minogue from Impossible Princess (1997)
- "Jump", by N*E*R*D from Fly or Die (2004)
- "Jump", by Simple Plan from Still Not Getting Any... (2004)
- "Jump", by Skylar Grey from Natural Causes (2016)
- "Jump", by XTC, B-side to Wonderland (1983)
- "Jump", by Yeat from 2 Alive (2022)
- "Jump!", by Nana Mizuki from Alive & Kicking (2004)
- "Jump!", by the Movement (1992)
- "Jumpin", by the 411 from Between the Sheets (2004)
- "Jumpin", by Doug Pinnick from Pineappleskunk (2001)
- "Jumpin", by Jeremih from Jeremih (2009)
- "Jumpin", by Pitbull (2023)
- "Jumpin", by Playboi Carti from Music (2025)
- "Jumpin", by Red Velvet from The ReVe Festival: Day 2 (2019)
- "Jump", by Aretha Franklin from Music from the Warner Bros. Picture "Sparkle" (1976)

=== Other uses in arts and media ===
- MDR Jump, a German public radio station
- Jump (magazine line), a line of manga magazines published by Shueisha
  - Weekly Shōnen Jump, the best-selling manga magazine of the line, often referred to as just Jump
- Jump (musical), a Korean comedic theatrical performance involving martial arts, acrobatics, and dance moves
- Jump drive, a speculative invention in science fiction, a method of traveling through hyperspace
- J.U.M.P., a fictional weapon in the G.I. Joe universe

== Places ==
- Jack's Urban Meeting Place, a creative activity center in downtown Boise, Idaho
- Jump, Kentucky, or Jump Station, an unincorporated community in Floyd County
- Jump, Ohio, a community in Hardin County
- Jump, South Yorkshire, a village in Barnsley, England

== Science and technology ==
=== Computing ===
- Jump instruction, used to alter the control flow of a program
- JuMP, an algebraic modeling language extension for the Julia language
- JumpDrive, a brand of, or a generic term for, USB flash drives
- Turing jump, an operator in recursion theory

=== Other uses in science and technology ===
- Jump discontinuity, a change in value of a mathematical function
- Jump, a step in a statistical jump process
- Jump, a step in a jump diffusion process
- Hydraulic jump, a phenomenon in fluid dynamics
- Jump start (vehicle), using a temporary electrical connection to start a vehicle that has a discharged battery
- Quantum jump, an abrupt transition in a quantum system

== Sports ==
- Figure skating jumps, an element of competitive figure skating disciplines
- Jumping (horse), a major element of many equestrian sports
  - Show jumping, or stadium jumping, a competitive equestrian event
- Jump rope, where one or more participants jump over a rope swung so that it passes under their feet and over their heads
- Parachuting, typically by jumping from a flying aircraft
  - BASE jumping, parachuting or wingsuit flying from a fixed structure or cliff
- Competitive events in the sport of athletics
  - High jump, a track and field event over a horizontal bar
  - Long jump, a track and field event
  - Pole vault, a track and field event sometimes known as pole jumping
  - Triple jump, a track and field event
  - Vertical jump, a power and endurance exercise, commonly used to measure the power output of athletes
- Vehicle jump, a stunt with a vehicle spanning the length of one side to another, usually over a dangerous obstacle

== Other uses ==
- Jump (surname), a surname
- Jump Associates, a design strategy firm based in San Mateo, California
- Jump Bikes, a dockless electric bicycle-sharing system available in many countries; it belongs to Lime (transportation company)
- Jump Trading, a company involved in high-frequency and algorithmic trading
- Join Us to Motivate People, an International Association for the Exchange of Students for Technical Experience seminar

== See also ==
- Jump River (disambiguation)
- Jumpy (disambiguation)
- Jump start (disambiguation)
- JMP (disambiguation)
