= Quantum jump (disambiguation) =

A quantum jump is a scientific phenomenon, a transition between quantum states.

Quantum jump may also refer to:

- paradigm shift or quantum jump, a drastic change and advancement
- Quantum Jump, a 1970s British band
- Quantum Jump (board game), or Exorbitare, a 1981 board game
- Quantum jump method, a technique in computational physics
- Atomic electron transition or quantum jump, a change of an electron between energy levels

== See also ==
- Quantum leap (disambiguation)
- Quantum (disambiguation)
- Jump (disambiguation)
