= Run around =

Run around or runaround may refer to:

== Film and television ==
- The Runaround (1931 film), an American comedy-drama film
- The Runaround (1946 film), an American mystery film directed by Charles Lamont
- All Nighter (film) (working title The Runaround), a 2017 American comedy directed by Gavin Wiesen
- Runaround (game show), a 1972–1973 American children's television show
- Runaround (British game show), a 1975–1981 adaptation of the American show

== Music ==
- "Run-Around" (song), by Blues Traveler, 1995
- "Runaround", a song by the Fleetwoods, 1960
- "Run Around", a song by Jefferson Airplane from Jefferson Airplane Takes Off, 1966
- "Runaround", a song by Rickie Lee Jones from The Magazine, 1984
- "Runaround", a song by Van Halen from For Unlawful Carnal Knowledge, 1991
- Runaround Kids, an English indie rock band

== Other uses ==
- "Runaround" (story), a 1942 short story by Isaac Asimov
- Runaround (typography), where text conforms to an irregular shape or intrusion
- Run around coil, a heat exchanger system
- Run-around loop, a track arrangement for reversing a train's direction
