= Quantum leap =

Quantum leap or variation, may refer to:

== In general ==
- Quantum leap (physics), also known as quantum jump, a transition between quantum states
  - Atomic electron transition, a key example of the physics phenomenon
- Paradigm shift, a sudden change of thinking, especially in a scientific discipline
- Tipping point (sociology), a sudden and drastic change of behavior by group members in a social environment

== Arts and entertainment ==
- Quantum Leap (1989 TV series), a 1989–1993 American television series
- Quantum Leap (2022 TV series), a revival of the 1989 series
- The Quantum Leap, a public art sculpture in Shrewsbury, England
- Quantum Leap, a 2021 album by Gus G
- Emergency: Quantum Leap, a 2019 EP by X1
- "Quantum Leap" (The Upper Hand), a 1995 television episode

== Other uses ==
- Sinclair Quantum Leap or QL, a personal computer from Sinclair
- Quantum Leap Technology, a (defunct) U.S. fuel cell company

== See also ==
- Quantum jump (disambiguation)
- Quantum (disambiguation)
- Leap (disambiguation)
- Tipping point (disambiguation)
