= Quantic =

Quantic may refer to:

- Quantic, an older name for a homogeneous polynomial.
- Quantic Dream, a video game developer studio
- Quantic (musician), British musician and producer
- Quantic School of Business and Technology, an online graduate school

== See also ==
- Quantum (disambiguation)
