= David Warren (director) =

American theatre and television director

- Born: United States
- Occupation(s): Theatre director, television director
- Spouse: Peter Frechette (m. 2017)

David Warren is an American theatre and television director.

== Career ==
=== Theatre ===
Warren has a number of Broadway production directing credits to his name, including Holiday, Summer and Smoke and Misalliance. His other, more extensive work includes the Jekyll & Hyde and Copacabana national tours, and several significant off-Broadway productions including Pterodactyls, Matt & Ben, Minutes from the Blue Route, Night and Her Stars, Hurrah at Last, The Dazzle, Raised in Captivity, Hobson's Choice and Drumstruck. He also has many credits for regional theatres including, among many others, Baltimore Center Stage, New York Stage and Film and South Coast Repertory.

=== Television ===
Warren's television credits include episodes of Desperate Housewives, Weeds, Gossip Girl, In Plain Sight, 90210, Ugly Betty, Drop Dead Diva, and Valentine. Desperate Housewives creator and executive producer Marc Cherry asked Warren to direct an episode of the show's third season having known him previously from the theatre. Warren and Cherry became close friends after Warren gave Cherry his first professional acting job over twenty years ago in a children's musical.

== Personal life ==
Warren is openly gay; his partner since 1988, and husband since 2017, is actor Peter Frechette, who has featured in a number of Warren's productions. Warren has an older brother, Seth, and younger sister, Jennifer, and currently lives in Los Angeles, though he is originally from New York City.
