= AOTD =

AOTD may refer to:

== Organizations ==
- Second Investigation Department, Lithuanian military intelligence agency

== Other uses ==
- Art of the Drink, the first video podcast to focus exclusively on bartending
- Asylum of the Daleks, the first episode of the seventh series of the British science fiction television series Doctor Who
