= The Imbible =

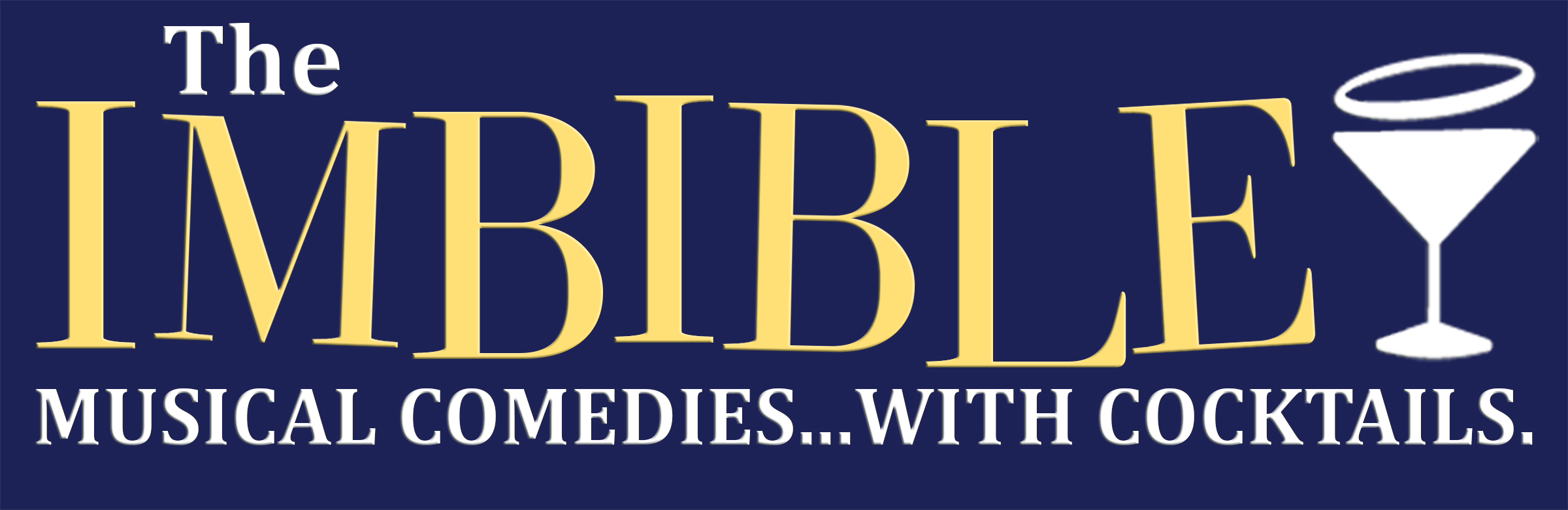
- Official series logo
- Music: Josh Ehrlich; Anthony Caporale
- Lyrics: Anthony Caporale
- Book: Anthony Caporale
- Productions: 2014 New York International Fringe Festival; 2014 Fringe Encore Series; 2014 Off-Broadway; 2024 Regional

The Imbible is a series of educational entertainment musicals created and produced by Anthony Caporale through his production company Broadway Theatre Studio. Each installment tells a different story about the history, science, and culture of alcoholic beverages through music, comedy, audience interaction, and drink making demonstrations and tastings during the performances.

The first installment, The Imbible: A Spirited History of Drinking, features a book and new lyrics by Caporale, and original musical arrangements by Josh Ehrlich and Anthony Caporale. Known for creating the award-winning video podcasts Art of the Drink and Broadway Bartender, Caporale selected the music and created new arrangements with Ehrlich, an arranger for Voices of Gotham.

The Imbible: A Spirited History of Drinking tells the story of how Western civilization has been influenced by the introduction of alcohol consumption from 10,000 BC through the Craft cocktail movement. Caporale was originally supported in the lead role of The Bartender by a trio of waiters who also serve as clowns, Greek chorus, and round out the parts of a barbershop quartet called The Backwaiters. Caporale ultimately played 535 consecutive Off-Broadway performances before moving to an understudy role to focus on producing the series.

== Plot ==
The narrative line is based on the Hero's journey, with ethanol filling the role of the traditional hero. The story opens with a "babe" of unknown origin found inside a basket, miraculously placed there by a higher power. Ethanol soon shows mysterious powers of healing before beginning an odyssey across the world. It accomplishes great deeds in Egypt, Arabia, Belgium, and India, growing first into spirits, then medicines, and finally cocktails. Ethanol then travels to the New World to face Prohibition, where it is defeated. After thirteen years, ethanol is resurrected on Repeal Day, emerging transformed and stronger than ever.

The educational structure is based on the visual-auditory-kinesthetic (VAK) learning style. Informational slides provide a visual complement to the auditory delivery, with drink samples filling in the kinesthetic component.

== History ==
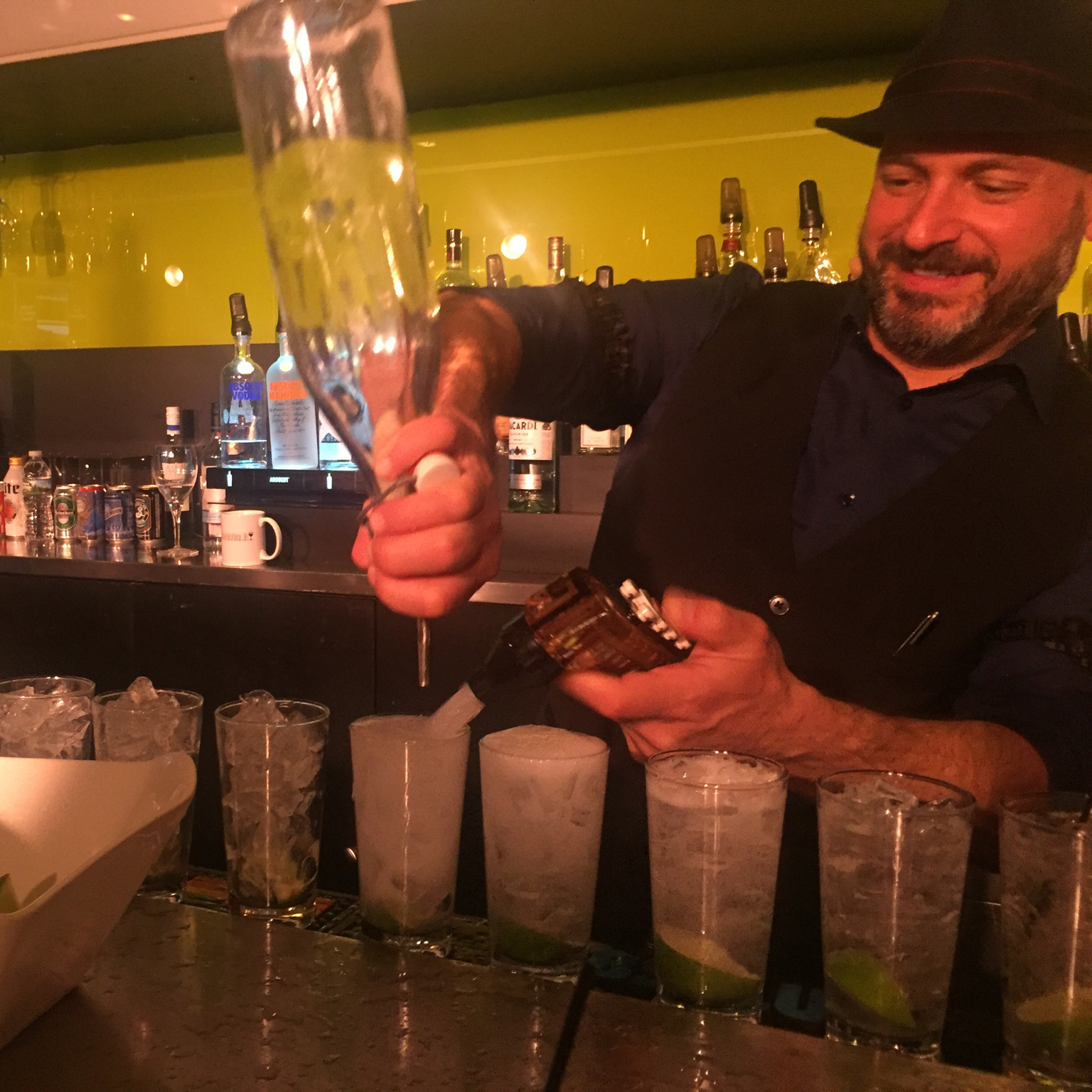
Anthony Caporale in The Imbible

The Imbible was conceived by Anthony Caporale, a beverage specialist and founder of Broadway Theatre Studio, a new play development workshop based in Manhattan. Development on the show began in 2011, following Caporale's Science of Mixology seminar at the Manhattan Cocktail Classic beverage show. Caporale based the book on the many presentations he developed as the National Brand Ambassador for Drambuie as well as classes he taught as a Culinary Management Instructor at the Institute of Culinary Education. In 2014, Caporale completed the first draft of the show to enter into the New York International Fringe Festival, where it was accepted to run for five performances. Following a critically acclaimed, sold-out run at FringeNYC, the show was selected for an extension in the 2014 Fringe Encore Series at SoHo Playhouse.

After completing a sold-out run at the Fringe Encore Series, the show opened Off-Broadway in November 2014. The Imbible garnered overwhelmingly positive critical response, and continues to play to capacity crowds at the SoHo Playhouse.

== Productions ==
=== FringeNYC (2014) ===
The Imbible premiered at the 2014 New York International Fringe Festival at the Celebration of Whimsey theater on August 8, 2014. The show was produced by Broadway Theatre Studio and directed by Nicole DiMattei, with production design by Michael Leslie. The production was originally headlined by Caporale in the leading role, with the Backwaiters played by DiMattei, Ruthellen Cheney, and Ariel Estrada.

=== Fringe Encore Series (2014) ===
The show was selected to participate in The Fringe Encore Series beginning on September 5, 2014 at the SoHo Playhouse in SoHo, Manhattan, New York. The production retained its original cast, and was originally booked for five performances through October 3, 2014. After selling out all five nights, it was extended for three additional performances through October 24, 2014.

=== Off-Broadway (2014–2020) ===
Due to its prior successful runs, the show remained at the SoHo Playhouse to open Off-Broadway on November 21, 2014. Broadway Theatre Studio continued to produce the run under Caporale’s direction, and Caporale, DiMattei, and Cheney remained in the cast, which was expanded to add Alessandra Migliaccio and Kristie Wortman as swings. Estrada was replaced by alternates Will Allen and Mark Edwards. In October 2016 the show moved to “The Green Room” at the New World Stages complex on 50th Street where it enjoyed an open run until March 2020 when all New York theatre shut down due to the COVID-19 pandemic.

=== Rum and Pirates (2015) ===
The series’s second installment, The Imbible: Rum and Pirates, was commissioned as the entertainment for Hornblower Cruises Alive After Five New York City cruises beginning in the summer of 2015. The sequel featured the story of rum told by a crew of singing pirates. Supporting cast members from the Off-Broadway production of “A Spirited History of Drinking” swung in and out of the show, with Caporale occasionally making guest appearances as well. Ehrlich provided original musical arrangements for Caporale’s new lyrics to classic sea shanties. The show was booked through October 2015 for its initial engagement.

Following the show's initial run with Hornblower Cruises, Caporale worked with longtime writing and production collaborator DiMattei, who co-wrote the book, to expand the property into a full-length production that ran Off-Broadway at The Producer’s Club for two summer seasons in 2018 and 2019.

=== Christmas Carol Cocktails (2015) ===
In the winter of 2015, Caporale created Christmas Carol Cocktails as The Imbible holiday production. The story begins the morning following Ebenezer Scrooge’s spectral visits, with the reformed miser inspired to host a Christmas party but finding himself with no experience making drinks for his guests. He summons back the three holiday spirits for assistance. Repeating his previous evening’s journey, he this time learns about Christmas drinks past, present, and future, awakening with the knowledge he needs to host a party “just like Old Fezziwig.” Caporale wrote the book and new lyrics to holiday carols over Ehrlich’s original arrangements. The production played Off-Broadway at The Producer’s Club for five sold-out holiday season runs from 2015 through 2019.

=== Day Drinking: The Brunch Musical (2017) ===
After The Imbible: A Spirited History of Drinking moved to New World Stages, Caporale and DiMattei collaborated with Ehrlich to develop Day Drinking: The Brunch Musical. The show tells the history of Brunch and popular brunch drinks through the story of four friends attending a brunch party. Caporale wrote the book, and Ehrlich composed original music and wrote the lyrics. The production opened Off-Broadway at New World Stages on May 28, 2017, and played over 250 performances before closing in 2020 due to the COVID-19 pandemic.

=== Licensed Productions (2024) ===
In 2024, The Shawnee Inn & Golf Resort licensed a customized version of A Spirited History of Drinking and Day Drinking to run as an immersive weekend experience.

== Characters and cast members ==
The cast members of all productions of The Imbible.

| Character | Voice Part | Original FringeNYC Cast | Fringe Encore Cast | Off-Broadway Cast | Off-Broadway Cast Swing |
|---|---|---|---|---|---|
| The Bartender | Lead | Anthony Caporale | Anthony Caporale | Anthony Caporale | None |
| Cocktail Waitress | Soprano | Nicole DiMattei | Nicole DiMattei | Nicole DiMattei | Alessandra Migliaccio |
| Liquor Runner | Alto | Ruthellen Cheney | Ruthellen Cheney | Kate Hoover | Kristin Guerin |
| Barback | Bass | Ariel Estrada | Ariel Estrada | Alec Lee | Vincent Donato |

== Reception ==
The Imbible received broad critical and audience praise for the plot, musical performances, actors' performances, and novel approach to education. The New York Times featured the original Fringe NYC production on the cover of its Arts section as one of their recommended shows of the festival. Time Out New York called the show "remarkably compelling" and named it a Critics' Pick. Wine Spectator noted the show was one of FringeNYC's "most buzzed-about musical comedies." Cocktailians.com said the show was "rollicking, charming, and delivers a ton of information." Lance Evans of StageBuddy reported, "The Imbible is educational and rip-roaring funny, with a talented and generous dose of song and dance."

== Awards and nominations ==
=== Off-Broadway production ===
| Year | Award | Category | Nominee | Result | Ref |
|---|---|---|---|---|---|
| 2015 | Best Of New York | Best Date Night | | Won | |

== See also ==
- Art of the Drink
