= Kvant =

Kvant is Russian for "quantum". See quantum (disambiguation).

Kvant may also refer to:

- Kvant (magazine), a Russian popular science magazine
- Kvant, a journal published by the Danish Physical Society
- Kvant-1, a module of the Soviet orbital station Mir launched in 1987
- Kvant-2, a module of the Soviet orbital station Mir launched in 1989
- MAI Kvant, a Soviet aerobatic trainer airplane
- NPP Kvant, a Soviet research and production institute (now a subsidiary of the Russian space flight corporation Roscosmos)
- FC Kvant Obninsk, a Russian football club
- Lars Kvant (1955–2025), a Swedish squash player
- Kurt Kvant, a recurring character in detective novels by Maj Sjöwall and Per Wahlöö
