= Martin Brozius =

Dutch actor, presenter and comedian (1941–2009)

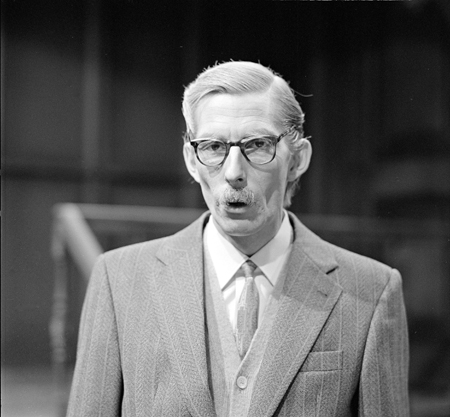
- Martin Brozius in 1972
- Born: 4 November 1941; Hoorn, Netherlands
- Died: 24 March 2009 (aged 67); Amsterdam, Netherlands
- Career
- Show: Ren je rot
- Country: Netherlands

Martin Brozius (4 November 1941 – 24 March 2009) was a Dutch actor, presenter and comedian.

== Biography ==
=== Youth & early career ===
After his parents divorced, Brozius was sent to a Catholic orphanage for subjection to the nuns' strict regime. A few years later he moved back in with his mother, who by then was running a snackbar; he even became her employee when he left school at 14. Two years later, Brozius decided to move on and move out; he sold lottery-tickets at fairgrounds before relocating to Amsterdam where he took acting lessons at the prestigious Kleinkunstacademie. Throughout the 1960s Brozius appeared in comedies and stage-plays with varying degrees of success and even released a few records.

=== Television, radio and movies ===
In 1968 Brozius made his television debut in children's series Oebele (alongside singer Rob de Nijs); two years later he guested in De Kleine Waarheid as a news-reporter and taped a sketch-show (Kort en Klein) with Jeroen Krabbé among others.

His twin-breakthrough came in the early 1970s; Brozius played a gator (Aernout Koffij) in the Pied Piper-themed series Hamelen and hosted the Dutch version of Runaround (Ren je Rot). Other credits aimed at his juvenile fanbase were a Monday-afternoon radio-show, the role of a sweet-tooth inventor's son (Felix) in the 1976-taped Peter en de Vliegende Autobus-movie and the lead-voice in the original Tintin cartoon series.

In 1979 Brozius took part in the rainy third episode of Sterrenslag (Battle Of The Stars) and in the early 1980s he appeared in commercials for theme-park Efteling.

=== Decline and fall ===
Ren je Rot had a longer lifespan than its equally successful UK-counterpart, but in 1983 parent broadcaster TROS decided to make a change after 123 episodes. Brozius continued performing at parties, events and made guest-appearances in television series; in 1985 he played a troubled policeman in a Christmas-episode of De Poppenkraam. His role as a gambler with money- and health-problems in the hospital-series Medisch Centrum West in 1989 would soon become reality.

Brozius invested his money in order to secure his children's future; the money got lost while the tax-bills were piling up. Brozius was forced to sell his properties (including his three apartments near Amsterdam Vondelpark); in the process he had his first heart attack and his second divorce.

Television appearances became sparse: in 1994 Brozius played an antiquarian in soap-series Goede tijden, slechte tijden and in 2001 he appeared in Terrorama! as a whore-hopper.

Brozius died on March 24, 2009, of diabetes, shortly after Ren je Rot was back on television as Kies je Ster, the Dutch version of Poparound which aired for two seasons.
