= Anthony Caporale =

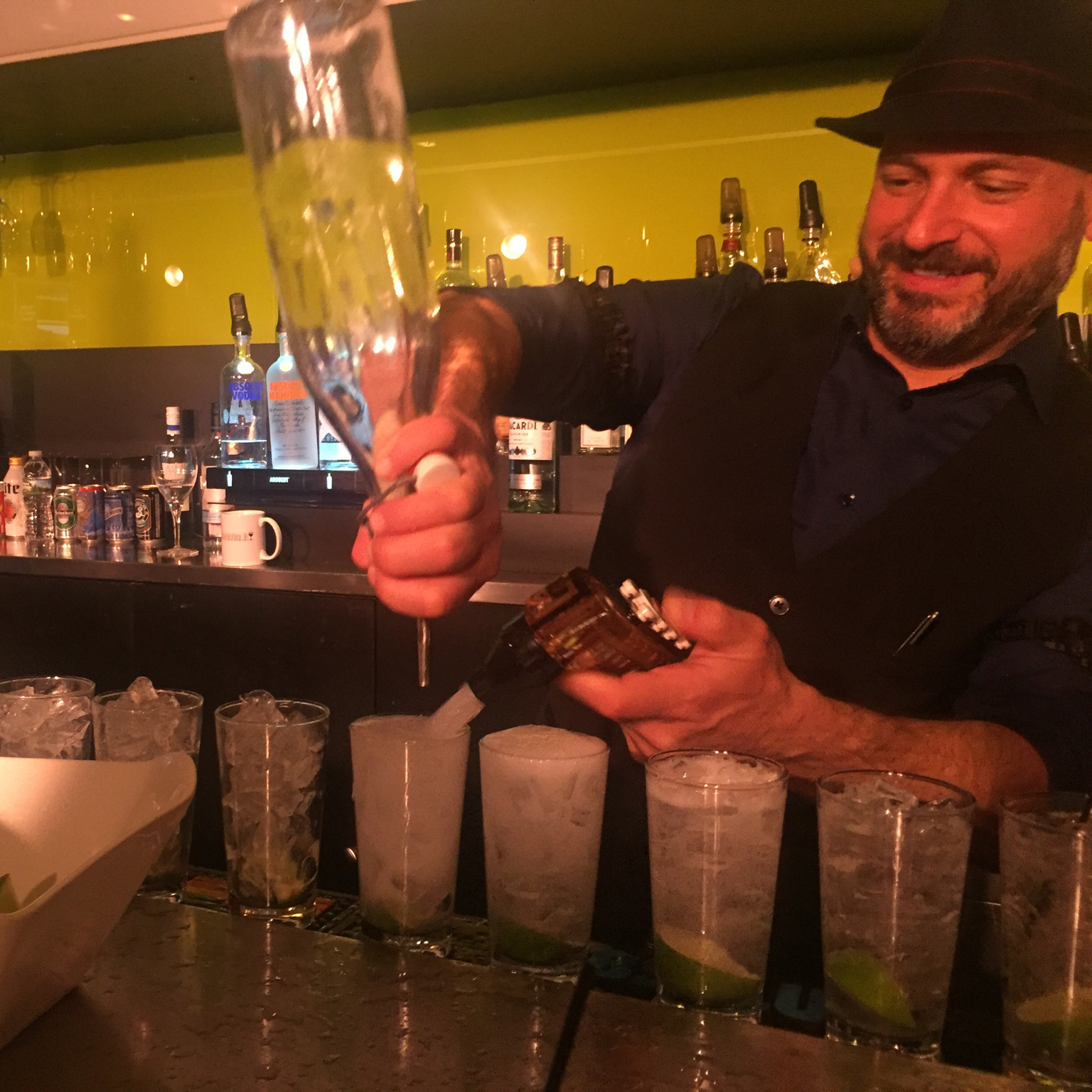
- Citizenship: American and Italian
- Education: Duke University
- Occupations: Playwright, theatre producer, beverage consultant, educator
- Years active: 1992 - present
- Website: anthonycaporale.com

Anthony Caporale is an American playwright, theatre producer, beverage expert, and educator. He is known for his work in mixology education and his role in creating and producing the Off-Broadway series The Imbible.

== Life and career ==
Caporale graduated with a dual degree in Mechanical Engineering and Materials Science in 1990 from Duke University.

Caporale began his career in 1990 as a bartender, before entering the engineering field in 1991. In 2006, he launched Art of the Drink, the first online video series focused exclusively on cocktails, spirits, and mixology. The series has been featured on major web video platforms, including TivoCast OnDemand and Cablevision Public Access. It was named Best Instructional Podcast by "The New York Times Online" and has been translated into Spanish and Chinese.

He also created and hosted "Broadway Bartender", a web series distributed by BroadwayWorld that won the Taste Award for Best Drink or Beverage Program Online. Additionally, he wrote and hosted the Spoon University video series “Mixology 101”.

He is a faculty member of the Culinary Management Program at the Institute of Culinary Education (ICE) in New York City. He serves as Director of Spirits Education and Beverage Research and authored the cocktail chapter of the cookbook Cognitive Cooking with Chef Watson: Recipes for Innovation from IBM & the Institute of Culinary Education.

He has also served as the U.S. Brand Ambassador for Drambuie Scotch Liqueur, the National Cocktail Ambassador for Truvia Natural Sweetener, and the Managing Editor for Chilled Magazine.

== Stage ==
Caporale wrote and produced The Imbible: A Spirited History of Drinking, a stage play exploring the history of alcohol through musical comedy, for the 2014 New York International Fringe Festival. The production received accolades from The New York Times and opened Off-Broadway at SoHo Playhouse following the festival. The show ran for three years with Caporale in the lead role, before moving to New World Stages where it ran for another three years with a new cast. It ultimately played over 1,000 performances, becoming one of the longest-running Off-Broadway productions and spawning three sequels.

== Accolades ==
He was commissioned Kentucky Colonel by the Governor of Kentucky, Steven L. Beshear for his contribution to Bourbon education. He has won a number of awards such as:

- Best Instructional Vlog (Art of the Drink) by Lulu.TV
- Best Instructional Podcast (Art of the Drink) by The New York Times Online
- Best Drink or Beverage Program Online (Broadway Bartender) by The Taste Awards
