= Quondam =

Quondam may refer to:

- John Sutton, 3rd Baron Dudley (1494–1553), English nobleman nicknamed Lord Quondam
- An early spelling of condom
- Quondam, a 1965 novel by David Pryce-Jones
- Quondam, a 1984 Acornsoft game

== See also ==
- Quantum (disambiguation)
