= Exorbitare =

1981 board game

Exorbitare, also known as Quantum Jump, is an abstract board game published by Orca Games in 1981.

== Description ==
Board representing energy levels of atoms

Exorbitare is an abstract family game for 2–6 players in which the circular board represents the first 86 elements on the Periodic Table of the Elements from hydrogen to radon, as well as an atom's various energy levels.

=== Components ===
- Circular board with five concentric tracks
- Two 6-sided dice
- Gamebox with rules printed on the back cover
- Six sets of coloured counters

=== Gameplay ===
Players choose a colour and take a quantity of counters based on the number of players: two players have 8 each, three players have 6 each, four players have four each, and five or six players have two each.

To start the game, players place all of their counters in the centre of the board. They then take turns rolling the dice. If a player rolls a 6, the player must move one counter onto the lowest energy track — the one closest to the centre — and then move the counter the full amount of both dice. Every time a player rolls a 6, the player rerolls one die and adds that number to movement. (If a player rolls a 6 on both dice, the player re-rolls both dice and adds the total of both to movement.)

Once a player has at least one counter on the board, the player has the option of bringing another counter onto the board the next time the player rolls a 6.

=== Gaining & losing energy ===
Once a counter has completed one circuit of the track that it is currently on and ends its turn back on the first square of that level (called a Jump Square), the counter jumps up one level to the next track. The player rolls an extra die for movement when this occurs.

When a counter ends its turn on the same square as another counter — even a counter owned by the same player — then the two counters are "blatted": the counter than was landed on moves down one energy level, while the counter that just arrived is boosted up one energy level.

If a counter passes another counter, the passed counter is "zapped" — it moves down one energy level — but the counter that zapped it does not change energy levels. If the piece that was zapped lands on an opponent's counter, a blat will occur, boosting the zapped counter back to its original energy level, while the target counter moves down one level one level. Likewise a counter blatted by a zapped counter can also blat a counter that it lands on.

If a counter lands on a square marked "Decay", it loses energy and falls back to the previous level.

=== Victory conditions ===
To win the game, a player must achieve "Quantum Jump" by fulfilling two conditions simultaneously:

1. All players must have exactly half of their counters in play.
2. The player has one counter on the yellow Quantum Jump square situated in the fourth energy level. A player can leave a counter on the Quantum Jump square waiting for the first condition to be fulfilled, or if the first condition has been fulfilled, can attempt to land a counter exactly on the Quantum Jump square. For the purposes of winning, this is the only time in the game when the player can choose to take the total of just one die or the other rather than the sum total of both dice, if doing so will win the game.

When these two conditions are fulfilled, the player with their counter on the Quantum Jump square wins immediately.

== Publication history ==
Exorbitare was designed by Nicholas Brennan and Bob Edwards and published by the British company Orca Games in 1981. Orca also released the family board game Sea Hawks the same year. Their third and final product was Rythmo, a game published in 1985 that was based on the medieval game Rithmomachy.

== Reception ==
Robert Hulston reviewed Quantum Jump for Imagine magazine, and stated that "In many ways the game is derived from ludo, but it is probably better than that old classic due to the greater control players can exercise over their pieces and the extra thought required for some moves. It is fine if you like abstract games, but will not really interest exclusively 'adventure' gamers."
