= Chase (Djumbo album) =

Studio album by Djumbo
- Released: 6 August 2010
- Genre: Pop
- Label: ABC
- Producer: Pieter van Schooten

Djumbo chronology
Magic (2008)	Chase (2010)

Chase is the fourth album from pop group Djumbo.

== Track listing ==
1. Chase
2. I Wanna Kiss You
3. No Way
4. Round
5. Look at the Sun
6. All Day
7. Disco
8. Sjans
9. Fiësta
10. Oh No
11. Wonder Of It All
12. Summertime In Dubai
13. Oorlogskind

== Singles ==
- Oorlogskind (20 June 2009)
- Summertime In Dubai (16 August 2009)
- Chase (22 Mai 2010)
- Sjans (25 October 2010)
