= Magic (Djumbo album) =

Studio album by Djumbo
- Released: 14 November 2008
- Genre: Pop
- Label: CMM
- Producer: Pieter van Schooten

Djumbo chronology
Spotlight (2007)	Magic (2008)	Chase (2010)

Magic is the third album from Djumbo. It was released as a normal version and also a special version with an extra book in November 2008.

== Track listing ==
On album

1. Boyz & Girlz
2. Best Friends
3. Anything
4. Party Party
5. I Want You To Know
6. Locomotion
7. Djumbo Medley

On CD-ROM

1. The Best Of Real Djumbo
2. Videoclip Boyz & Girlz
3. Making of Boyz & Girlz
4. Videoclip Boy I Like Ya
5. Making of Boy I Like Ya
6. Videoclip Abracadabra
7. Videoclip Dit Is Real

== Singles ==
- Boyz & Girlz (4 September 2008)
