= Daniel Fischer =

Daniel Fischer may refer to:

- Daniel Fischer (footballer) (born 1997), Austrian footballer
- Daniel Fischer (politician) (born 1952), from Wisconsin
- Daniel Fischer, presenter of the German version of Runaround
- Daniel Fischer of Fischer Motor Company

== See also ==
- Daniel Fisher (disambiguation)
