= Frisz =

Dutch pop group

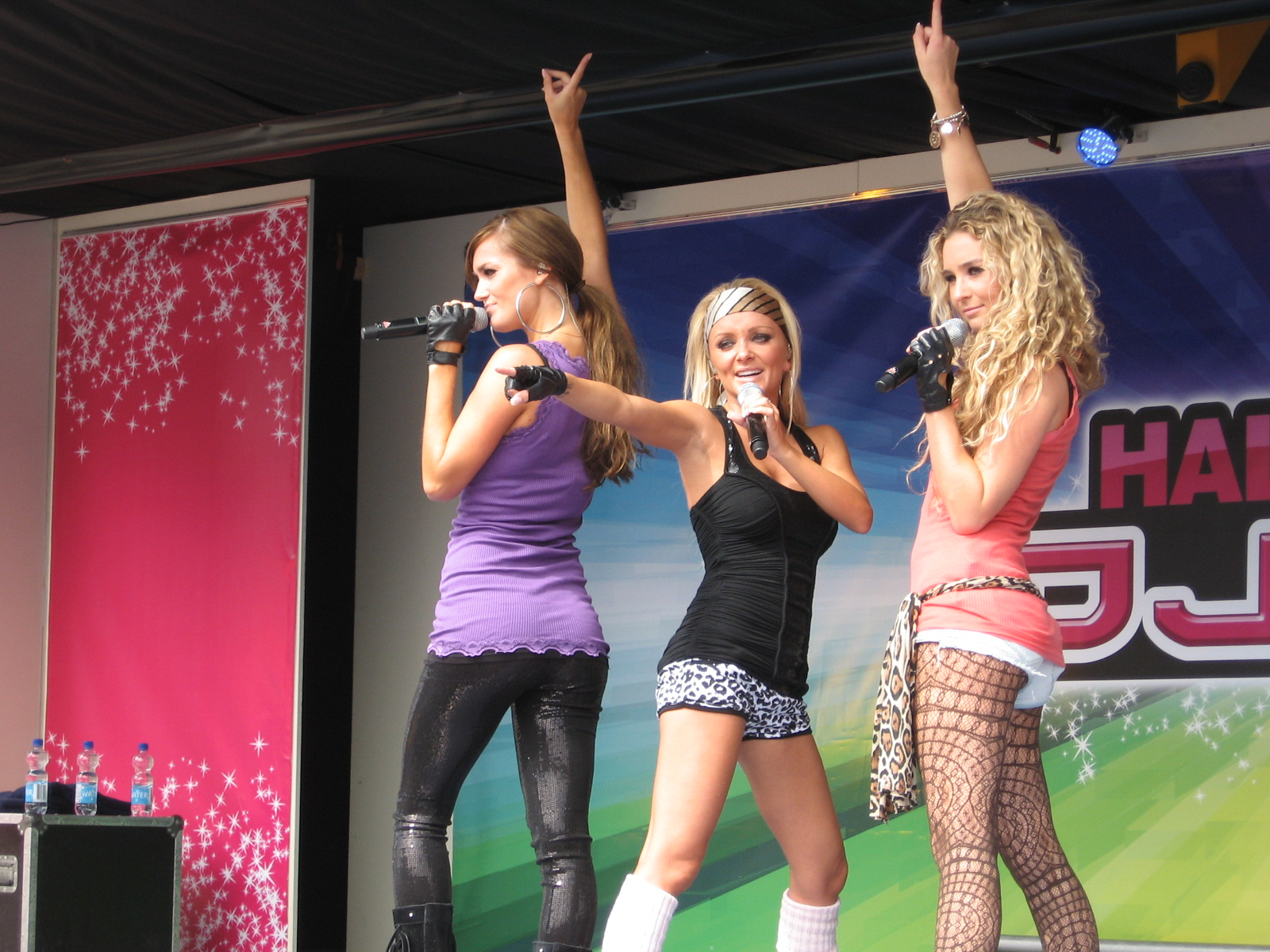
- ^{Djumbo (old line-up) on 'Hallo Djumbo Tour'}

Background information
- Origin: Netherlands
- Genres: Pop
- Instrument: Vocals
- Years active: 2004–2018
- Labels: CMM, ABC
- Members: Samantha Klumper; Lindsy Schuman; Danique van Rosmalen
- Past members: Lotte Prijs; Svenja van Beek
- Website: www.djumbo.com (Dutch)

Frisz is a pop group based in the Netherlands. The group was previously (2004–2015) known as Djumbo.

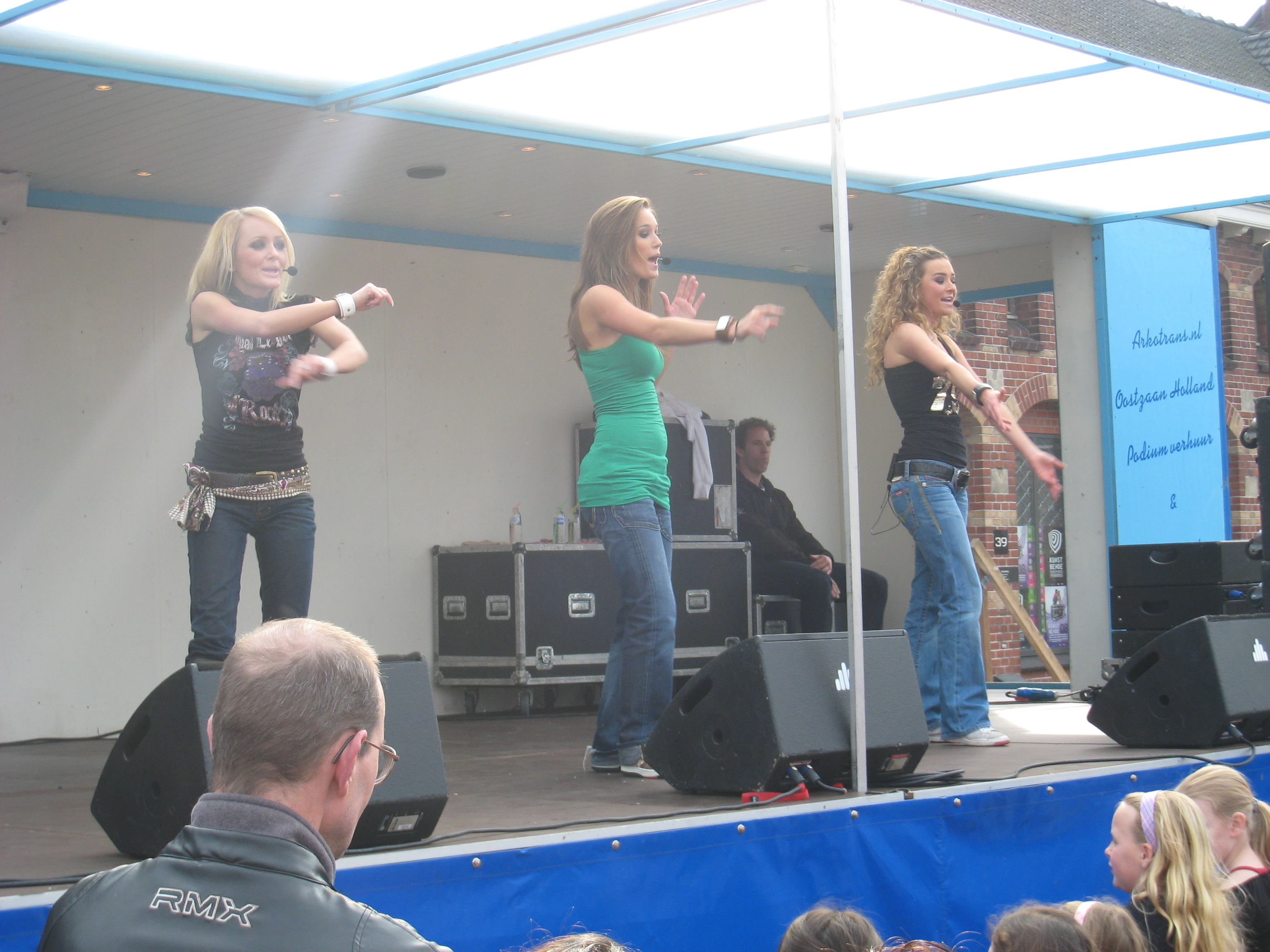
The Djumbo line-up

The three girls met in a dancing school in Eindhoven, where their dancing skills were discovered by a record producer who signed them up for their first single "Hide and Seek" under the Djumbo Project.

The lyrics of most Djumbo songs are written in a combination of English and Dutch, with the majority of a song being in Dutch and the chorus (and title) being in English.

== New line-up ==
Svenja decided to leave Djumbo. She said: "After 7 beautiful years with Djumbo, I wanna grow further." She was replaced by Samantha Klumper.

== Side-projects ==
In 2009-2010 Djumbo hosted the pop and showbizz game show Kies je ster (Pick your star) for broadcast on TROS. The format was a spinoff from the classic Ren je rot (1973–1983), itself being the Dutch version of Runaround.

== Frisz ==
In 2015, following Lotte Prijs's departure, Djumbo held a new round of auditions, selecting Danique van Rosmalen as their new member. It was also announced Djumbo would change their name to Frisz moving forward.

In 2017, they returned with their new single "Rainbow In The Sky", their first new single under their new name.

Since early 2018, however, Frisz has gone silent on social media with members moving on to other careers. It's presumed that Frisz silently disbanded.

== Members ==
Member	2004	2005	2006	2007	2008	2009	2010	2011	2012	2013	2014	2015	2016
Svenja van Beek (2004–2011)													
Lotte Prijs (2004–2015)													
**Lindsy Schuman** (2004–2018)													
**Samantha Klumper** (2011–2018)													
**Danique van Rosmalen** (2015–2018)													

- Note: those in **bold** are current members.

== Discography ==
=== Albums ===
List of albums, with selected chart positions.
Title	Album details	Peak chart positions
Title	Album details	NL
Jump	Released: 9 May 2005; Label: CMM; Formats: CD, digital download	22
Spotlight	Released: 9 November 2007; Label: CMM; Formats: CD, digital download	26
Magic	Released: 14 November 2008; Label: CMM; Formats: CD, digital download	11
Chase	Released: 6 August 2010; Label: ABC Entertainment; Formats: CD, digital download	41
