= New World Stages =

Off-Broadway theaters in Manhattan, New York

- Dodger Stages (2004–2006)
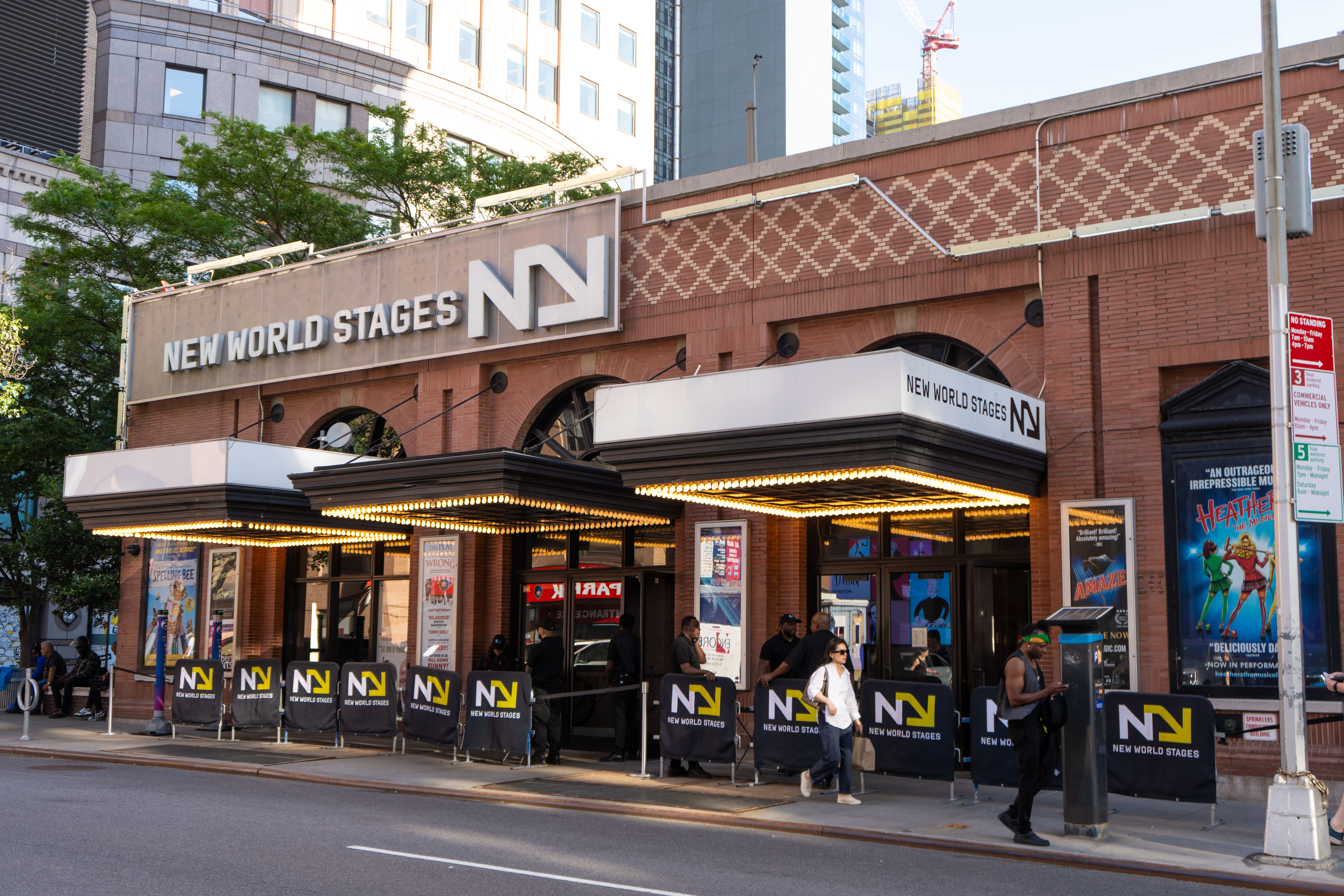
- New World Stages in June 2026
- Interactive map of New World Stages
- Address: 340 West 50th Street; New York City; United States
- Coordinates: 40.76277°N 73.98758°W
- Owner: The Shubert Organization
- Capacity: Stage 1: 499; Stage 2: 350; Stage 3: 499; Stage 4: 350; Stage 5: 199
- Type: Off-Broadway

Construction
- Opened: 2004
- Architect: Beyer Blinder Belle

Website
- www.newworldstages.com

New World Stages is a five-theater, Off-Broadway performing arts complex in the Hell's Kitchen neighborhood of Manhattan in New York City. It is between 49th and 50th Streets beneath the plaza of the Worldwide Plaza complex at Eighth Avenue.

== History ==
Constructed on the site of the third Madison Square Garden, New World Stages was originally built as a Loews Cineplex Entertainment multiplex cinema at Worldwide Plaza. The Worldwide Cinemas multiplex opened in June 1989 and was originally operated by the Cineplex Odeon Corporation. The Loews Cineplex at Worldwide Plaza closed in early 2001 after its operator went bankrupt. The former multiplex temporarily served as office space for accounting firm Deloitte later that year after that firm's offices were destroyed in the September 11 attacks.

Dodger Stage Holding Theatricals leased the complex in 2002 with plans to convert the former six-screen multiplex into five Off-Broadway stages. The movie theater complex reopened as Dodger Stages in 2004 following substantial renovations. The architects were Beyer Blinder Belle, the theatre designers were Sachs Morgan, and the interior designer was Klara Zieglerova. Since that time, the theater complex has housed many commercial theatrical productions, as well as numerous corporate events, readings, and concerts. Dodger Stages was renamed New World Stages on March 16, 2006, concurrent with Stage Entertainment’s assuming sole ownership of the complex. Since November 17, 2014, the venue has been owned and operated by The Shubert Organization.

In addition to new Off-Broadway productions, New World Stages has become a home to shows that were previously on Broadway, including Avenue Q, The 39 Steps, Million Dollar Quartet, Peter and the Starcatcher, Jersey Boys, and The Play That Goes Wrong. This producing tactic has been utilized to encourage the extension of a show's commercial run. The venue has also become a location for the piggybacking model, whereby multiple shows adjust their playing times and share the same theater, set, and tech personnel to lower the costs of keeping an open-ended Off-Broadway show running. The theatres and lobby are also available for special events, including conferences, readings, workshops and receptions.

== Statistics ==
New World Stages houses five theaters. Stages 1 and 3 have a maximum of 499 seats each, Stages 2 and 4 have a maximum of 350 seats each, and Stage 5 has a maximum of 199 seats. These capacities, greater than 100, fewer than 500, define New World Stages as an Off-Broadway complex. (Theaters with fewer than 100 seats are Off-Off-Broadway; theaters with 500 or more seats that are in the theater district are classified as Broadway level.) The maximum weekly capacity, assuming five shows running concurrently in the five theaters, each for eight performances per week, is 15,176 people.

The complete square footage of the underground complex is 61,300 square feet (5,690 m^{2}), and it reaches underground the length of a full city block, from 49th Street to 50th Street.

== Show history ==
The following information is taken from the Internet Off-Broadway Database. New World Stages has been home to a variety of Off-Broadway shows in its brief history, ranging in theme from a water based puppet show to a zombie musical. Current productions are in bold.

=== Stage 1 ===
499 Seats

- The Great American Trailer Park Musical, August 20, 2005 – December 4, 2005
- Evil Dead the Musical, October 2, 2006 – February 17, 2007
- Elvis People, June 6, 2007 – June 23, 2007
- Die, Mommie, Die!, October 9, 2007 – January 13, 2008
- Jackie Mason: The Ultimate Jew, March 18, 2008 – July 20, 2008
- Rock of Ages, October 1, 2008 – January 4, 2009
- The Toxic Avenger, March 18, 2009 – January 3, 2010
- The 39 Steps, March 25, 2010 – January 16, 2011
- Between Worlds (Entre Mundos), March 4, 2011 – April 24, 2011
- Rent, July 14, 2011 – September 9, 2012
- Peter and the Starcatcher, March 18, 2013 – January 12, 2014
- Heathers: The Musical, March 17, 2014 – August 4, 2014
- Nevermore: The Imaginary Life and Mysterious Death of Edgar Allan Poe, January 14, 2015 – March 29, 2015
- Tappin' Thru Life, December 23, 2015 – February 21, 2016
- iLuminate, November 22, 2016 – January 8, 2017
- Building the Wall, May 12, 2017 - June 4, 2017
- Jersey Boys, November 22, 2017 – May 22, 2022
- Melissa Etheridge My Window - A Journey Through Life, October 13, 2022 - October 29, 2022
- Fidler Afn Dakh, November 13, 2022 – January 1, 2023
- iLuminate, November 17, 2023 – January 21, 2024
- A Sign of the Times, February 8, 2024 – June 2, 2024
- EMPIRE: The Musical, July 1, 2024 – September 22, 2024
- Teeth, October 18, 2024 – January 5, 2025
- Heathers: The Musical, June 22, 2025 – October 11, 2026

=== Stage 2 ===
350 Seats

- Pieces (of Ass), December 7, 2004 – March 27, 2005
- Drumstruck, May 12, 2005 – November 12, 2006
- Bill W. and Dr. Bob, February 16, 2007 – June 10, 2007
- Celia, August 28, 2007 – May 25, 2008
- Flamingo Court, July 17, 2008 – September 28, 2008
- Rooms – A Rock Romance, February 27, 2009 – May 10, 2009
- **Gazillion Bubble Show, September 18, 2009 – January 18, 2027** (moved from Stage 3)
- Voca People, February 16, 2012 – September 2, 2012
- Jackie Hoffman's A Chanukah Carol, December 8, 2012 - December 29, 2012
- Greed: A Musical for Our Times, March 19, 2014 - April 19, 2014
- Blank! The Musical, November 1, 2014 - November 30, 2014
- Men are from Mars, Women are from Venus LIVE!, October 22, 2015 – November 29, 2015
- One Funny Mother, March 31, 2016 – January 7, 2017
- **Katsura Sunshine's Rakugo**, September 19, 2019 – January 8, 2027

=== Stage 3 ===
499 Seats

- Mandy Patinkin in Concert, September 20, 2004 – October 28, 2004
- Modern Orthodox, November 11, 2004 – May 8, 2005
- A Mother, A Daughter, and A Gun, October 14, 2005 – November 27, 2007
- Burleigh Grime$, May 23, 2006 – July 16, 2006
- Mimi le Duck, November 6, 2006 – December 3, 2006
- Gazillion Bubble Show, January 17, 2007 – September 6, 2009 (moved to Stage 2)
- Avenue Q, October 9, 2009 – May 26, 2019
- Rock of Ages, June 19, 2019 – March 11, 2020
- A Sherlock Carol, November 11, 2021 – January 2, 2022
- ¡Americano!, March 31, 2022 – June 19, 2022
- A Sherlock Carol, November 21, 2022 – January 1, 2023
- Dog Man: The Musical, March 4, 2023 - April 30, 2023
- Rock and Roll Man, June 3, 2023 – September 1, 2023
- Mind Mangler: A Night of Tragic Illusion, November 10, 2023 – January 28, 2024
- Stalker, March 18, 2024 – September 1, 2024
- Drag: The Musical, September 30, 2024 – April 27, 2025
- Rolling Thunder, July 10, 2025 – September 7, 2025
- The 25th Annual Putnam County Spelling Bee, November 7, 2025 – October 11, 2026
- **A Kidman Carol, November 16, 2026 – December 30, 2026**

=== Stage 4 ===
350 Seats

- The Immigrant, October 8, 2004 - November 28, 2004
- Altar Boyz, February 15, 2005 – January 10, 2010
- Naked Boys Singing, October 14, 2005 – January 28, 2012
- White's Lies, April 12, 2010 – June 13, 2010
- Freckleface Strawberry, October 1, 2010 – April 24, 2011
- Jump, May 11, 2011 - June 12, 2011
- Million Dollar Quartet, July 28, 2011 – June 24, 2012
- Bullet for Adolf, July 19, 2012 – September 30, 2012
- Bare: The Musical, November 19, 2012 – February 3, 2013
- iLuminate, June 24, 2013 – January 18, 2015
- Clinton: The Musical, March 25, 2015 – June 21, 2015
- Shear Madness, October 22, 2015 – July 10, 2016
- Not That Jewish, October 6, 2016 – April 30, 2017
- The Government Inspector, July 5, 2017 - August 20, 2017
- A Clockwork Orange, September 2, 2017 - December 2, 2017
- Desperate Measures, May 30, 2018 – October 28, 2018
- **The Play That Goes Wrong, February 11, 2019 – Present**

=== Stage 5 ===
199 Seats

- Symphonie Fantastique: August 31, 2004 – January 2, 2005
- The Musical of Musicals (The Musical!), February 2, 2005 – November 13, 2005
- Christine Jorgensen Reveals, December 29, 2005 – January 18, 2006
- Sidd: A New Musical, February 23, 2006 – March 26, 2006
- How to Save the World and Find True Love in 90 Minutes, November 4, 2006 – December 31, 2006
- Sealed for Freshness, February 15, 2007 – April 29, 2007
- My First Time, July 12, 2007 – January 22, 2010
- The All-American Sport of Bi-Partisan Bashing, August 6, 2007 – October 14, 2007
- Make Me a Song, October 30, 2007 – December 30, 2007
- Pinkalicious, the Musical, January 12, 2008 – September 21, 2008
- Tim Minchin, March 5, 2008 – April 12, 2008
- The Castle, March 30, 2008 – May 23, 2009
- East 14th, June 26, 2008 – September 6, 2008
- What's That Smell: The Music of Jacob Sterling, November 1, 2008 – December 28, 2008
- Flamingo Court, April 18, 2009 – July 19, 2009
- For Lovers Only (Love Songs...Nothing But Love Songs, April 24, 2009 – August 3, 2009
- Love Child, October 23, 2009 – January 3, 2010
- The Temperamentals, February 18, 2010 – May 30, 2010
- John Tartaglia's ImaginOcean, March 17, 2010 – September 4, 2011
- Devil Boys from Beyond, November 3, 2010 – December 4, 2010
- La Barberia, February 3, 2011 – June 12, 2011
- Freud's Last Session, October 7, 2011 – July 22, 2012
- In the Bar of a Tokyo Hotel, October 13, 2012 – October 28, 2012
- Forever Dusty, November 11, 2012 – April 7, 2013
- The Two-Character Play, June 13, 2013 – September 29, 2013
- Murder for Two, November 6, 2013 – June 29, 2014
- Stalking the Bogeyman, September 12, 2014 – November 9, 2014
- Churchill, February 6, 2015 – July 12, 2015
- Would You Still Love Me If..., October 10, 2015 – October 26, 2015
- Mad Libs Live!, November 1, 2015 – January 3, 2016
- Real Men: The Musical, November 12, 2015 – December 12, 2015
- The Woodsman, January 27, 2016 – May 29, 2016
- A Class Act, July 9, 2016 – August 28, 2016
- Verso, September 19, 2016 – November 27, 2016
- Church & State, March 3, 2017 – June 4, 2017
- Puffs, or: Seven Increasingly Eventful Years at a Certain School of Magic and Magic, July 8, 2017 – August 18, 2019
- MsTRIAL, November 14, 2019 – February 2, 2020
- Drift, February 29, 2020 – March 11, 2020
- The Alchemist, November 7, 2021 – December 15, 2021
- Little Girl Blue, March 5, 2022 – May 29, 2022
- Without You, January 14, 2023 – June 11, 2023
- Dracula, A Comedy of Terrors, September 4, 2023 – January 7, 2024
- The Life and Slimes of Marc Summers, February 14, 2024 – June 2, 2024
- Mama, I'm A Big Girl Now!, November 2, 2024 – December 21, 2024
- Last Call, March 12, 2025 – May 4, 2025
- The Imaginary Invalid, May 21, 2025 – June 29, 2025
- **Jamie Allan's Amaze, July 20, 2025 – Present**

== The Green Room ==
The Green Room is a bar and lounge area located downstairs at New World Stages. Drinks bought from The Green Room are allowed to be brought into the theaters.

From October 14, 2016 through March 11, 2020, The Green Room was home to The Imbible: A Spirited History of Drinking.
