= Jumpy =

Jumpy may refer to:

- Citroën Jumpy, a commercial van
- Jumpy Geathers (born 1960), American football player
- Jumpy (play), 2011 play by April De Angelis

== See also ==
- Jump (disambiguation)
