= Daniel Fisher =

Daniel Fisher, Danny Fisher, or Dan Fisher may refer to:

== Music ==
- Daniel Fisher, English musician with the Cooper Temple Clause
- Dan Fisher, co-composer of the 1946 Billie Holiday song "Good Morning Heartache"

== Politics ==
- Daniel Fisher (Australian politician) (1812–1884), MHA in South Australia
- Daniel Fisher (Massachusetts politician) (died 1683), Speaker of the Massachusetts House of Deputies
- Daniel Fisher (Dedham) (died 1713), representative to the Great and General Court of Massachusetts
- Dan Fisher (Oklahoma politician) (born 1958), member of the Oklahoma House of Representatives
- Dan Fisher (Nebraska politician), member of the Nebraska Legislature

== Science ==
- Daniel Fisher (paleontologist), American paleontologist
- Daniel S. Fisher (born 1956), American theoretical physicist

== Other people ==
- Daniel Fisher (minister) (1731–1807), English dissenting minister
- Dan Fisher (volleyball) (born 1976), American volleyball coach and former player
- Daniel Webster Fisher, president of Hanover College 1879–1907

== Fictional ==
- Danny Fisher, the protagonist of the 1952 Harold Robbins novel A Stone for Danny Fisher

== See also ==
- Daniel Fischer (disambiguation)
