= Birgit Lechtermann =

German television presenter, book author and media coach

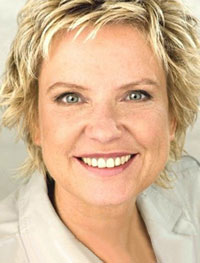
Lechtermann in 2008

Birgit "Biggi" Lechtermann (born March 8, 1960, in Gütersloh) is a German television presenter, book author, and media coach.

== Life ==
Birgit Lechtermann initially completed a commercial apprenticeship in Gütersloh at Bertelsmann AG. In 1983 she began her radio and TV career at RTL Radio Luxemburg with training as an editor and presenter. Until 1993, she presented daily programs such as Guten Morgen Deutschland, the two-hour lunchtime show with Hugo Egon Balder and many others. Parallel to radio, she initially presented for the newly founded private television station RTL plus and, from 1985, for ZDF's Ferienprogramm for children. Biggi became known to a wider public primarily through the children's quiz program 1, 2 or 3, which she hosted from 1985 to 1995 as the successor to Michael Schanze. From 1985 to 1988, she presented the ZDF program Computer Corner together with Klaus Möller. In 1986/87, she hosted the quiz Mit dem Kopf durch die Wand on the ZDF afternoon program. For RTL she hosted the primetime format Small Talk, for VOX the quiz show Trivial Pursuit and for Super RTL she developed and hosted the format Die Super RTL Familie.

From 2000 Birgit Lechtermann developed various TV formats for several production companies, including the TV format Wir testen die Besten for KiKA and ARD, which was awarded the Goldener Spatz in the entertainment category in May 2005. In 2006, she received the HumanAward from the Familie Kluge Stiftung of the University of Cologne for this children's knowledge show. Birgit Lechtermann has worked primarily as an author and media trainer for several years. She has also published several radio plays for children. In 2009, she co-authored the book Der Schicksals-Code. In September 2012, she published the book: Karriere, Kinder, Küche - So machen es Erfolgsfrauen. In 2014, Birgit Lechtermann developed and initiated the major young chef competition "Next Queen of Cuisine". In 2015/2016, she also published the book Danke, Dog - ein Hund ist die beste Medizin! From May to December 2018, she hosted the program Live nach neun on Ersten. Since 2018, she has hosted the program Lechtermann, Gesundheit und Leben on Health TV. In February 2023, she launched the series Lechtermann Live on the East Belgian radio station Radio 700, which she presents for three hours every Sunday.

After additional training as an enrichment coach at the University of Cologne with Karl-J. Kluge, she has been training managers, experts, presenters etc. for appearances for over fifteen years. She is a lecturer at the Deutsche Rednerschule in Berlin.

Lechtermann is the widow of motorsport journalist Willy Knupp, who died in 2006, and has a daughter. She has been married for a second time since October 2023.

Lechtermann runs the podcast Lechterhaus with her co-host Patrick Santos (aka. Lehzina).
