= Jump River (disambiguation) =

The Jump River is a tributary of the Chippewa River in northern Wisconsin.

Jump River may also refer to:

- Jump River (town), Wisconsin, in Taylor County
- Jump River (community), Wisconsin, an unincorporated community located in the town, on the banks of the Jump River

== See also ==
- Jump (disambiguation)
