= Hamelen (TV series) =

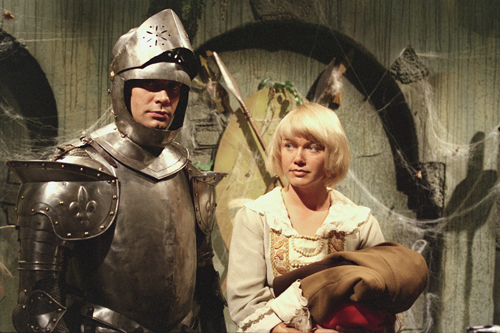
- Rob de Nijs and Loeki Knol
- Genre: Children's Programming
- Country of origin: Netherlands
- Original language: Dutch
- No. of episodes: 45

Kunt u mij de weg naar Hamelen vertellen, mijnheer? (Do you know the way to Hamelin, Sir ?; lit. Can you tell me the way to Hamelin, sir?) is a Dutch children's television series from the 1970s. It was broadcast by KRO and became an instant success.

== Overview ==
Based on the fairy tale "The Pied Piper of Hamelin", it tells what happened with the children after they disappeared from this German town.

When The Piedpiper solves the rat problem in the town of Hamelin The Mayor refuses to pay him his gold so out of revenge he disappears with all the children of the town and 4 adults (Bertram Bierenbroodspot, his fiancé and the daughter of the Mayor Lidwientje Walg, Gatekeeper Aernout Koffij and Town Crier Hildebrandt Brom), the alternate reality they find themselves in is an Alice in Wonderland-like adventure with flying pumpkins and carpets, mud fighting princes, dwarfs and witches, a love elixir, Wensela's melting ice palace and a lot more. The show featured over 120 songs.

== Episodes ==
45 episodes were taped between 1972 and 1976; only the last six survive on tape, aside from a few compilations of the first episodes, as after broadcasting the tapes were wiped to be reused. A significant part of the erased material has been preserved by recording on a videocassette recorder, though in inferior quality.

== Cast ==
- Rob de Nijs; Bertram Bierenbroodspot: Son of cloth merchant Simon Bierenbroodspot
- Ida Bons (Season 1)/Loeki Knol (Seasons 2-5); Lidwientje Walg: Bertram's fiancée and the daughter of Mayor Willem Walg
- Ab Hofstee; Hildebrandt Brom: The Town Crier of Hamelin (is the only one who wasn't under the influence of The Pied Piper's music, because he kept his ears covered)
- Martin Brozius; Aernout Koffij: Gatekeeper of Hamelin
- Kinderkoor Henk van der Velde: Children of Hamelin

== Reunions ==
In late 1989 KRO reran the final 6 episodes and footage from a 1976 one-off concert. Many of the actors reunited for a television appearance dressed in the same costumes. Another reunion followed eight years later; this time some of the original child actors were involved.

== Musical ==
A musical version premièred on 13 October 2003 in Tilburg. Loeki Knol was the only original cast member involved, playing Lidwina Walg. The show also featured Chantal Janzen and Kim-Lian.

Cast:

- René van Kooten: Bertram Bierenbroodspot
- Chantal Janzen: Lidwientje Walg
- Maarten Wansink: Hildebrandt Brom/Prince Roelof
- Job Schuring: Aernout Koffij/Prince Koen
- Michel Sorbach: Piedpiper/Gruizel Gruis/Guurt van Grasp
- Ellis van Laarhoven: Wenzela/Mother of Hilletje
- Loeki Knol: Lidwina Walg/Queen
- Jan Elbertse: Ambtenaar Ogterop/Mayor Walg
- Danny Rook: Prince Tor/Spicht
- Kim-Lian van der Meij: Princess Madelein
- Suzan Seegers: Hilletje Labberton
- Martin Stritzko: Barend Stip
