= Runaround (game show) =

- Created by: Heatter-Quigley Productions
- Presented by: Paul Winchell
- Announcer: Kenny Williams
- Country of origin: United States
- No. of seasons: 1
- No. of episodes: 13

Production
- Running time: 30 minutes

Original release
- Network: NBC
- Release: September 9, 1972 – September 1, 1973

Runaround is a children's television game show produced by Heatter-Quigley Productions. The program was hosted by ventriloquist and voice actor Paul Winchell, airing Saturday mornings on NBC from September 9, 1972, to September 1, 1973.

Paul would frequently use his dummies, Jerry Mahoney and/or Knucklehead Smiff on his program. The program was announced by Kenny Williams (as most Heatter-Quigley shows were), with music by Mort Garson. However, the show received low ratings and was canceled following the first season.

== Format ==
The basic format of the game invited nine children to answer a three-way multiple choice question by running towards their chosen answer, then standing on marked areas numbered 1, 2 or 3. Just before the correct answer is revealed, the host invites the children to "Runaround... now!" at which point they have a split second to jump onto a different area; the premise is to give opponents the "runaround" in case they are merely following their movements.

Host Winchell would say, before giving the correct answer, "When you hear the click, stick!" and then a moment later, "Last chance!", after which point he would press a finger-clicker (a toy device that made a clicking sound). Players still moving or not on one of the three answer areas were eliminated from the round (sent to a penalty area at the side of the stage). Winchell would then say, "Let's see who's right with the light!", whereupon the house lights would dim and the area for the correct answer would light up. Players with the correct answer took a pink ball from a large bowl near the middle of the stage; players with the incorrect answer were eliminated from the round. Each player had a transparent tube, into which the balls were dropped (this was a substitute scoring device for tote boards, which the show did not have). The player with the most balls at the end of the show was the day's winner.

== International versions ==
=== Dutch version (Ren je Rot/Kies je Ster) ===
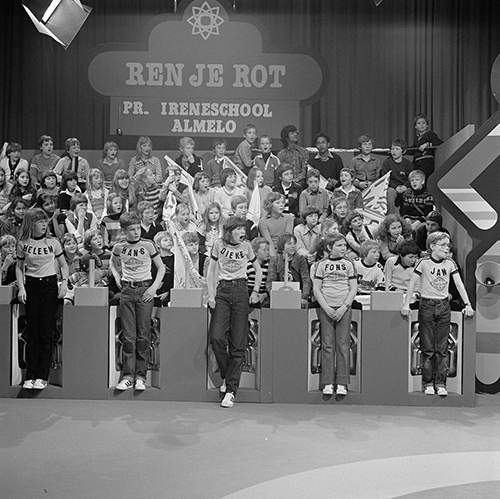
Still from Ren je Rot

- The format was sold to the Netherlands for broadcast on TROS. Ren je Rot the Dutch translates as Run Till You Drop) began on October 5, 1973, and was presented by actor Martin Brozius (and sideman Lars Boom). His catchphrase was "Rrrren je rrrot". The show launched the career of magician Hans Kazàn who debuted in the 1976/77 season.
- After 123 shows, TROS felt that the programme had run its course; the final broadcast was June 1, 1983. Martin Brozius continued performing at parties and events. Tax- and health problems prevented him from bringing the formula on stage. Brozius died on March 24, 2009, of diabetes.
- Kazan filled the void with his Blufshow before commercial station RTL asked him to present The Price is Right. He toured relentlessly with his Magic Show which included his two sons and daughter-in-law. Kazan now lives in Spain.
- In 2009-2010 the members of three-piece girl group Djumbo hosted Kies je Ster (Pick Your Star), the Dutch version of Poparound.

=== German version (Eins, Zwei oder Drei) ===
- Eins, Zwei oder Drei ("One, Two or Three") began on December 10, 1977, and was the very first show on German TV to be licensed from the United States. In the show, which is produced by the public TV stations of Germany (ZDF), Austria (ORF) and until 2006, Switzerland (SF), three teams are competing; one from Germany, one from Austria and one from another country (e.g. Georgia, Bulgaria, Namibia), replacing Switzerland, which sent a team until 2006. Each of the teams consists of three children, both boys and girls, being about nine to eleven years in age. Michael Schanze hosted the first eight seasons, until 1985, when he was replaced by Birgit Lechtermann. She hosted the show for ten years. The third presenter from 1995 on was Gregor Steinbrenner, who also presented the 25th anniversary of the show in 2002, which was celebrated by staging a 25-hour quiz marathon. Daniel Fischer, who debuted in 2005, was the fourth presenter. The fifth and current presenter is the comedian Elton, who debuted in 2010.

Country	Name	Host	Network	Date premiered
Austria; Germany; Switzerland	1, 2 oder 3	Michael Schanze (1977–1985); Birgit Lechtermann (1985–1995); Gregor Steinbrenner (1995–2005); Daniel Fischer (2005–2010); Elton (2010–present)	ORF; ZDF; SF	December 4, 1977 – present
Netherlands	Ren je Rot; Kies je Ster	Martin Brozius; Djumbo	TROS	October 5, 1973 – June 1, 1983; 2009
United Kingdom	Runaround; Poparound	Mike Reid (1975–1977; 1978–1981); Leslie Crowther (1977–1978); Stan Boardman (1977–1978); Gary Crowley (1985–1986)	ITV	September 2, 1975 – September 7, 1981; June 19, 1985 – June 4, 1986
