= JMP =

JMP may refer to:

- JMP (statistical software), a statistical analysis application by SAS Institute, Inc.
- JMP (x86 instruction)
- Joint Monitoring Programme for Water Supply and Sanitation, a program by WHO and UNICEF to monitor a particular Millennium Development Goal
- UC Berkeley – UCSF Joint Medical Program
- The Journeyman Project, a 1992 game series from Presto Studios
- Joint Meeting Parties, a coalition of opposition political parties in Yemen
- Joshua Moufawad-Paul, Canadian Maoist
- JMP.chat, an XMPP to SMS gateway service
