= Johnny Schuler =

Peruvian television chef

Schuler in 2018

Johnny Schuler is a business owner, author, restaurateur, distiller and public figure from Lima, Peru. He is chairman and owner of La Caravedo group Holdings and Pisco Porton. He owns two restaurants in Lima, Key Club and the La Granja Azul chain. Schuler is an authority on pisco, a spirit that has been declared as a national cultural heritage by Peru's National Institute of Culture.

Over a thirty-year career, Schuler has traveled around the world educating spirits professionals and the public about pisco. Peru's congress awarded him a Congressional Medal of Honor in 2007 for his work to increase the quality and popularity of Peruvian pisco.

== Institutional role ==
In 1987 he was a founding member of the National Tasters Guild in Peru. As a member of INDECOPI, an organization responsible for protecting consumer rights and monitoring fair business practices in the country, Schuler was tasked with tasting and verifying the authenticity of any beverage seeking official designation as Peruvian pisco. He is also a member of National Commission of Pisco (CONAPISCO) which promotes and protects the quality and standards of pisco in Peru.

== Advocacy ==
Schuler hosted Por Las Rutas del Pisco, a show dedicated to pisco tradition, mixology and cuisine. The show airs on TVPeru in Peru and on the CanalSur channel on DirecTV throughout Latin America and The United States. He is also the author of the books Pasión por el Pisco and Rutas y Sabores.

Johnny Schuler helped raise the international profile of pisco through presentations at International spirits events such as the London Wine Fair in 2008 and judging spirits at prominent international competitions such as the Concours Mondial de Bruxelles.

== Production ==
In 2010, Johnny Schuler became the master distiller of Pisco Portón, a mosto verde pisco produced at Hacienda La Caravedo in Ica, Peru. Founded in 1684, the distillery is the oldest working bodega in the Americas.
