= Runaround Kids =

English indie rock band

- Origin: Wakefield, West Yorkshire, England
- Genres: Indie rock, garage rock, punk rock
- Years active: 2007–present
- Label: Philophobia Music,
- Members: George Garthwaite; Jack Winn; Rob Burnell
- Website: runaroundkids.com

Runaround Kids were an English three-piece indie rock band from Wakefield, West Yorkshire. The band consisted of George Garthwaite, Jack Winn, Rob Burnell. They enjoyed notable success on the British indie rock scene, occasionally receiving mainstream attention, including being named Huw Stephens' "Tip of the Week" on his Radio One show in September 2010.

== History ==
Runaround Kids formed in 2007, two years in later in 2009 they released their first EP, Kiss Chase. Jumbo Records, Leeds, described it as; "Really, really great indie pop/rock that chugs along like a frantic newwave addicted monkey". In August 2010 they played Reading and Leeds Festivals. In 2011 they returned to Leeds Festival on special request of Leeds label Dance to the Radio. Between those two milestones the band familiarised themselves with the festival circuit, playing the Constellations and Long Division Festivals, as wells as Live at Leeds, Tramlines, Eurocultured and Bomfest, whilst also supporting bands such as Jeffrey Lewis, Pulled Apart By Horses, Johnny Foreigner, Dinosaur Pile-Up and Shrag.

In August 2011 they released their debut album Linked Arms to critical acclaim. Drowned in Sound praised it as "A noisy, assertive piece of work… energetic bursts all sharing infiltrating melodies and a fuzzy lo-fi aesthetic". Whilst Vibrating Magazine have declared them "One of The UK’s most promising acts". The album has led to them being playlisted on Amazing Radio as well as numerous plays on BBC 6Music and Radio 1.

In April 2012, they released the single "You'd Feel The Same". The single received greater media attention than any of the band's previous releases, which led to Manchester Music stating; "(It) could well be the best anthem to come out of West Yorkshire this year. Wakefield's finest hour". A limited number of T-shirts displaying the artwork were available along with the single upon its release. The artwork itself pictures the derelict Stanley Royd Hospital Chapel in Wakefield.

Later that year the bnd released a split 12" record with the Dublin band, We Are Losers. Three songs were contributed to the release by each band, with Runaround Kids on the A-side and We Are Losers taking the B-side.

Compilation album Teeth Blue, Lips Red was released on 10 December 2012, compiling the singles from the year with new songs. The CD was accompanied by a comic book drawn by George Garthwaite, the band's guitarist. The promotional release has led to Against The Odds describing it as "Amazing. Infectious to the point where you'll be pushing the repeat button over and over again without even noticing" and Joyzine Radio selecting it as their 'Album of The Week'.

== Break Up ==
After a period of silence the band announced they were breaking up on 5 July 2015. In a Facebook post detailing their decision, the band released Chemicals, a final collection of songs recorded in December 2013.

== Band members ==
- George Garthwaite – guitar, vocals (2007–2015)
- Jack Winn – bass guitar, vocals (2007–2015)
- Rob Burnell – drums (2010–2015)

== Discography and releases ==
=== Studio albums ===
Title	Album details
Linked Arms	Released: 8 August 2011; Label: Philophobia Music; Formats: CD, digital download
Teeth Blue, Lips Red	Released: 10 December 2012; Label: Philophobia Music; Formats: CD, digital download

=== Extended plays ===
Title	Album details
Kiss Chase	Released: 17 August 2009; Label: Philophobia Music; Formats: CD, digital download
Runaround Kids Vs; We Are Losers	Released: 9 July 2012; Label: Philophobia Music; Formats: vinyl, digital download

=== Singles ===
Title	Single details
"No Dreams"	Released: 13 September 2010; Label: Philophobia Music; Formats: vinyl, digital download; B-side: "Falling into Better Hands"
"You'd Feel The Same"	Released: 16 April 2012; Label: Philophobia Music; Formats: CD, digital download
"Into The Light"	Released: 15 October 2012; Label: Philophobia Music; Formats: cassette, digital download; B-side: "Atomic Arabian Facebuster" (The Spills)
