= Gary Crowley =

English radio presenter

Gary Crowley (born 8 October 1961), is an English broadcaster, TV presenter and DJ.

== Career ==
=== The Modern World ===
While still at Rutherford School, Paddington, in the late 1970s Gary Crowley founded the new wave fanzine The Modern World, interviewing many of the most significant bands of the day including The Sex Pistols, The Clash and The Jam. Unknown schoolboy Crowley persuaded The Clash's Joe Strummer to give him an interview and later spent time with the band as they rehearsed for their Complete Control tour in London's Chalk Farm studios. Crowley's ability to spot new talent has been a signature of his thirty-year broadcasting career, and he remains today as one of London's most respected champions of independent music.

=== Young DJ and broadcaster ===
On leaving school in 1978, Crowley took up a junior position at Decca records before joining the staff of the NME, taking over from Danny Baker as the telephone receptionist at their offices in Carnaby Street. At this time the weekly music paper was at the centre of the punk explosion under the editorship of Neil Spencer; Crowley was at the NME alongside writers Julie Burchill, Tony Parsons, Nick Kent, Charles Shaar Murray.

Crowley's knowledge of music attracted the attention of broadcasters and in 1980 he was hired by London's independent commercial station Capital Radio, and aged 19 became the youngest radio DJ in the UK.

Throughout the 1980s, Crowley became a prolific broadcaster / promoter, hosting regular club night at the Wag Club London (1981–1986) and at Bogarts Harrow, where he showcased many prominent chart acts at early points in their career, including The Style Council, Bananarama, Wham! and others. TV presenting followed, as Crowley was hired to front Fun Factory ITV on Saturday mornings and game shows including Runaround spin-off Poparound which ran through the late 1980s. At this point Crowley was presenting his an acclaimed weekly radio show The Magic Box on Capital Radio.

In 1983, Gary Crowley compèred the first national UK tour by Wham!

=== Britpop ===
In 1994, he conducted the first TV interview with Liam and Noel Gallagher of Oasis (just prior to the release of Definitely Maybe) and later brought other Britpop bands to the show including Blur and Pulp. For the next five years he interviewed acts including Björk, Manic Street Preachers, Henry Rollins, Massive Attack, David Sylvian, and other TV presenting jobs followed most recently with Rockworld TV. His Sunday afternoon radio show, which ran on the BBC station Greater London Radio from 1990 to 1997, continued to unearth new talent; Crowley was the first British DJ to champion new rock acts Suede and Bush.

In 1996, Crowley was invited to introduce Oasis on stage for their historic Knebworth concert.

=== XFM ===
In 1997, Crowley left the BBC to join the London's first indie station, Chris Parry's XFM, where Steve Lamacq, Mary Anne Hobbs and Alan Freeman had broadcast in test transmissions. Crowley was given the mid-morning show but on the day before launch, Diana, Princess of Wales died, and so on 1 September 1997 Crowley had to open the new radio station with the words:

It's Monday the first of September, and welcome to XFM, broadcasting on 104.9. We find ourselves starting a radio station today in circumstances we wouldn’t have wished, due to the tragic death of Diana, Princess of Wales. As a mark of respect to someone we saw as someone going her own way, standing apart from the rest, and for being a remarkable ambassador in the struggles for the dispossessed, the sufferers of leprosy and AIDS, and the ongoing horror of land mines, we wish to dedicate the activities of our launch day to her memory.

— Gary Crowley, launching XFM London in 1997

=== Mature broadcaster ===
In August 1998, Crowley left XFM along with Ricky Gervais and others when the station was sold to Capital. Crowley had been offered XFM's overnight slot, and soon returned to the renamed BBC London 94.9, where he fronts a two-hour weekly show on Saturday evenings. Crowley often makes an occasional 'supersub' appearances on BBC 6 Music and for a while hosted a weekly programme on Amazing Radio, a digital station dedicated to new and emerging music. Gary Crowley has interviewed some of the UK's most influential musical artists of the 20th century, including Paul McCartney, David Bowie, Robert Plant, U2, Blur, Oasis, Jamiroquai, Small Faces, and more.
