= Art of the Drink =

Beverage podcast

- Promotional cover art
- Genre: Instructional Bartending tutorial
- Format: Video podcast
- Country of origin: United States
- Language: English

Creative team
- Created by: Anthony Caporale, David McCoy
- Developed by: David McCoy
- Written by: Anthony Caporale
- Directed by: Anthony Caporale

Cast and voices
- Hosted by: Anthony Caporale
- Starring: Anthony Caporale
- Narrated by: Anthony Caporale

Production
- Production: Lion’s Cathedral Productions
- Length: 5–15 minutes

Publication
- No. of episodes: 95
- Original release: May 2005 – 31 July 2019
- Provider: YouTube
- Updates: Weekly

Related
- Website: aotd.tv

Art of the Drink was the first weekly video podcast focusing exclusively on instructional bartending. It was created by Anthony Caporale and David McCoy as an extension of Caporale's Art of the Drink Instructional Bartending DVD, and premiered in May 2005. The series was produced by Caporale's Lion's Cathedral Productions company, with the final episode released on YouTube on July 31, 2019.

== Podcast format ==
Each episode followed a two-act format: Caporale prepared a cocktail, then a co-host replicated the process based on his instructions. Many installments included a trivia contest referencing prior episodes and concluded with outtakes from the filming process. Caporale's five-to-fifteen-minute videos focused on concise demonstrations behind a bar. He covered everything from the correct glassware and ice to the right liquors, often using multiple camera angles. Except for occasional interviews or On the Road segments, he mixed original and classic cocktails like The Samuels or the Sazerac on set, while an accompanying blog expanded on topics such as "proof" and the difference between shaking and stirring.

== Reception ==
Zach Jones of Tubefilter, wrote in his review that he found the podcast "incredibly informative" and the instructions "are easy to understand." Art of the Drink was a featured How-To Podcast on iTunes. The series was also featured in The News & Observer and commended as a Best of 2006 in The New York Times.

== Notable episodes ==
Art of the Drink was invited to cover a number of notable events, including the 2009 White House Press Dinner, and the launches of Maker's 46 Bourbon and Pisco Porton. Leading beverage industry guests included Bill Samuels Jr., Johnny Schuler, Charlotte Voisey, and Junior Merino.

== Sponsors ==
Months after its launch, Art of the Drink received a multi-year sponsorship from Maker's Mark Bourbon in one of the earliest social media influencer programs. Later sponsors included Truvia Natural Sweetener, Pisco Porton, and Tanteo Tequila.

== Awards and recognition ==
Art of the Drink received the Lulu TV Award for Best Instructional Vlog in 2006 and was featured as a How-To Podcast on iTunes. It was a Taste Award Finalist in 2010 and 2012 for Best Drink or Beverage Program: Web.

== Episodes ==
Episode	Title	Released
1	Mexican Mojito	25 April 2006
2	Ginger Julep	5 May 2006
3	Mimosa Royale	9 May 2006
4	Holy Grail	16 May 2006
5	Beach Bellini	22 May 2006
6	White Chocolate Martini	30 May 2006
7	World Cup	6 June 2006
8	Godfather	13 June 2006
9	Sunset Pousse-Café	20 June 2006
10	Kryptini	25 June 2006
11	Bourbon & Branch	3 July 2006
12	Planter's Punch	9 July 2006
13	Wine Presentation	17 July 2006
14	Lynchburg Lemonade	24 July 2006
15	Cosmopolitan	31 July 2006
16	Blue Motorcycle	7 August 2006
17	Snake Bite	15 August 2006
18	Metropolitan	23 August 2006
19	Whisky Flip	30 August 2006
20	Hurricane	7 September 2006
21	First Down	13 September 2006
22	Applejack Rabbit	20 September 2006
23	Presbyterian	26 September 2006
24	Season 1 Highlights	23 October 2006
25	Zombie	27 October 2006
26	Mai Tai	3 November 2006
27	Rick Lyke Interview	8 November 2006
28	Hot Buttered Cider	23 November 2006
29	Rose Petal	30 November 2006
30	Candy Cane Martini	13 December 2006
31	Ginger Green Tea Toddy	18 December 2006
32	Anthony's Syllabub	21 December 2006
33	Champagne Cocktail	28 December 2006
34	Bill Samuels Jr. Interview	20 January 2007
35	His‑n‑Hers	7 February 2007
36	Sazerac	13 February 2007
37	Negroni	21 February 2007
38	Maker's Mark Distillery Tour	1 March 2007
39	Season 2 Outtakes	9 March 2007
40	St. Patrick's Day Irish Coffee	16 March 2007
41	Bourbon Tasting Class	23 March 2007
42	Espresso Martini	29 March 2007
43	Easter Ascension	5 April 2007
44	Classic Caipirinha	12 April 2007
45	The Samuels	20 April 2007
46	Yakety Yak	14 April 2007
47	Labor Day Master Steak	28 August 2007
48	Sidecar	24 October 2007
49	Thanksgiving Vanilla Martini	17 November 2007
50	Singapore Sling!	19 December 2007
51	Maker's Mark Egg Nog	24 December 2007
52	New Year's Eve Cocktail	30 December 2007
53	St. Patrick's Day Nutty Irishman	12 March 2008
54	Easter Spring Awakening	19 March 2008
55	Lychee Martini	20 April 2008
56	Classic Cocktails: Manhattan	15 May 2008
57	Memorial Day Sex On The Beach	21 May 2008
58	Absinthe	24 June 2008
59	July 4th Piña Colada	1 July 2008
60	Classic Cocktails: Margarita	16 July 2008
61	Fresh Sour	30 July 2008
62	Maker's Mark Old Fashioned	13 August 2008
63	Rosie Lee	27 August 2008
64	Daddy‑O	10 September 2008
65	Baracktail – Election Special 1	15 October 2008
66	Maverick – Election Special 2	17 October 2008
67	Shark Ice	5 November 2008
68	Passion Fruit Paloma	1 April 2009
69	Root Beer Float	20 May 2009
70	White House Press Dinner, Part 1	5 July 2009
71	White House Press Dinner, Part 2	21 September 2009
72	White House Press Dinner, Part 3	29 October 2009
73	Classic Mint Julep	5 May 2010
74	Maker's 46	25 July 2010
75	Pisco Portón Sour	7 June 2011
	Samuels Redux – On the Road	11 February 2010
76	Science of Mixology: Craft Ice	24 August 2011
77	Science of Mixology: Chilled Glassware	7 September 2011
78	Science of Mixology: Shaking vs Stirring	21 September 2011
79	Science of Mixology: Physics of Flair	5 October 2011
80	Science of Mixology: Vodka Flash	17 February 2013
81	Talking Pisco with Junior Merino	23 February 2014
82	Earth Day Cocktail	20 March 2014
83	For Your Island	23 April 2014
84	The Truvia Bar/Tea Package	31 May 2014
85	Flavored Truvia Syrups	10 June 2014
86	Fit‑n‑Fresh Margaritas	17 June 2014
87	Ginger‑Mint Margaritas	23 June 2014
88	Fit‑n‑Fresh Cocktails	1 July 2014
89	The Truvia Bar/Tea Package	22 July 2014
90	Nicole DiMattei (ACSM‑PT) on Truvia	31 October 2014
91	The Anatomy of a Cocktail	7 November 2014
92	Video thumbnail: Batches, Bottles and Bowls, Part 1: Batching Cocktails	14 November 2014
93	Batches, Bottles and Bowls, Part 2: Bottling Cocktails	16 December 2014
94	Batches, Bottles and Bowls, Part 3: Punch Bowl Cocktails	23 December 2014
95	Non‑Alcoholic Vodka	30 July 2019
