= Jump (Djumbo album) =

Studio album by Djumbo
- Released: 9 May 2005
- Genre: Pop
- Label: CMM
- Producer: Pieter van Schooten, Ed van Otterdijk

Djumbo chronology
Jump (2005)	Spotlight (2007)

Jump is the first album of the girlband Djumbo. It was released on 9 May 2005.

== Track listing ==
1. Hide & Seek (Pak Me Dan)
2. Call Me
3. Made To Love You
4. Going Up
5. Get Out
6. Bye Bye Bye
7. Know My Name
8. Eyahe (Ik Wil Met Jou)
9. On My Own
10. Time Out
11. The Djumbo Jump
12. Lullaby
13. Hide & Seek (Catch Us If You Can)
14. Eyahe (Wanna Be With You)

== Singles ==
- Hide & Seek (Pak Me Dan) (6 September 2004)
- Eyahe (Ik Wil Met Jou) (12 February 2005)
- The Djumbo Jump (2 July 2005)
- Made to Love You (29 October 2005)
