= Quantum Magazine =

Math and science magazine

Quantum: The Magazine of Math and Science was a United States-based bimonthly magazine of mathematics and science, primarily physics, designed for young readers. It was published by the National Science Teachers Association (NSTA) and Springer-Verlag and was headquartered in Washington, D.C..

Quantum was a sister publication of the Russian magazine Kvant. Quantum contained translations from Kvant and original material.

The magazine was founded in 1990. It ceased publication with its July/August 2001 issue.

Two books derived from Quantum materials have been published: Quantoons and Quantum Quandaries.

All articles from the magazine are indexed online by the NSTA.
