= Sea Hawks (board game) =

1981 board game

Sea Hawks is a family board game about pirates and buried treasure published by Orca Games in 1981.

== Description ==
Sea Hawks is a game for 2–4 players, each of which is an 18th-century pirate captain sailing the Spanish Main, searching for buried treasure. There are ten sea chests on the map, but only one contains treasure. The first captain to discern which one contains the treasure and transport it to their home port is the winner.

=== Components ===
- 20" x 28" board with map of the Spanish Main
- four plastic ship markers
- ten plastic sea chests
- markers
- a plastic sea monster
- two decks of cards
- two 6-sided dice
- rulebook

=== Gameplay ===
Nine of the ten sea chests placed on the map are empty. Players collect treasure cards, which tell the player which chests do NOT contain treasure. Through a process of elimination, players deduce which chest does contain the treasure. They must then sail to it and bring it back to their home port. Other players can try to steal the chest by engaging in ship-to-ship combat. Fate cards introduce another element of random chance, forcing the drawing player to make a die roll to avoid catastrophes like being shipwrewcked or marooned.

== Reception ==
Elaine Smith reviewed Sea Hawks for Imagine magazine, and stated that "Sea Hawks is a quickly played, easily understood and well packaged game. The board is sturdy and the playing pieces functional and attractive. Recommended for 10 year old to adult, it is a thoughtfully designed family game which is quickly learned and playable in an hour."
