= Drumstruck =

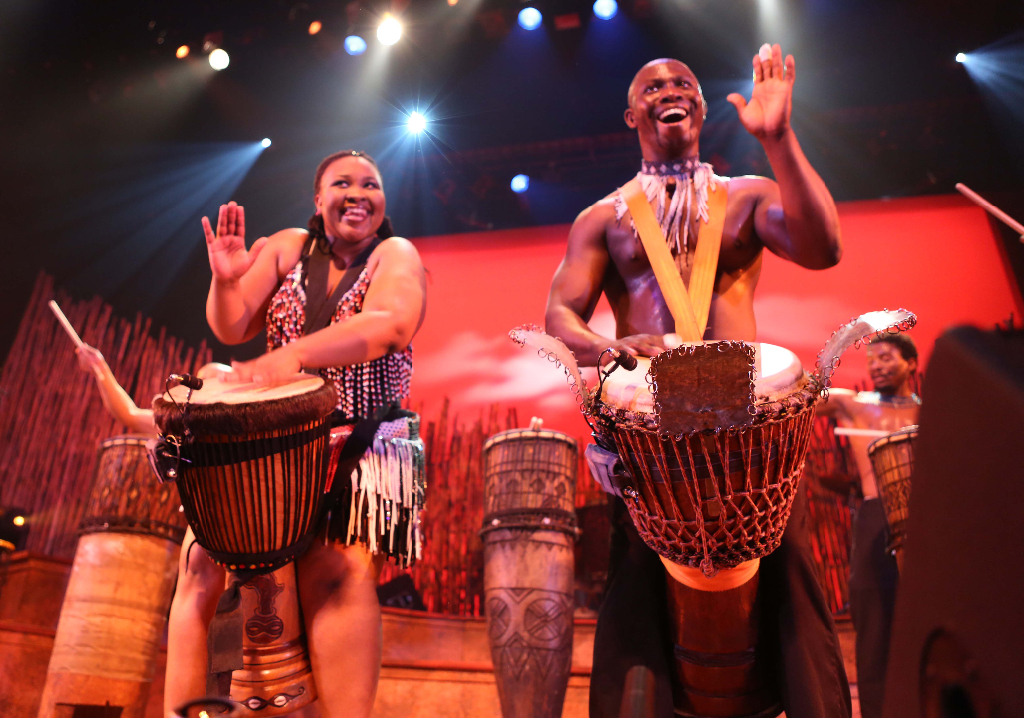
Patrick Popee and Tiny Modise

Drumstruck, billed as the world's first interactive drum theater experience, is an interactive play created by South African entrepreneur Warren Lieberman and Kathy-Jo Ross. The play is based on the corporate team building performance group Drum Cafe which brought companies together through playing the djembe. Drumstruck originated in South Africa, and toured China and Australia before coming to New York City in 2005.

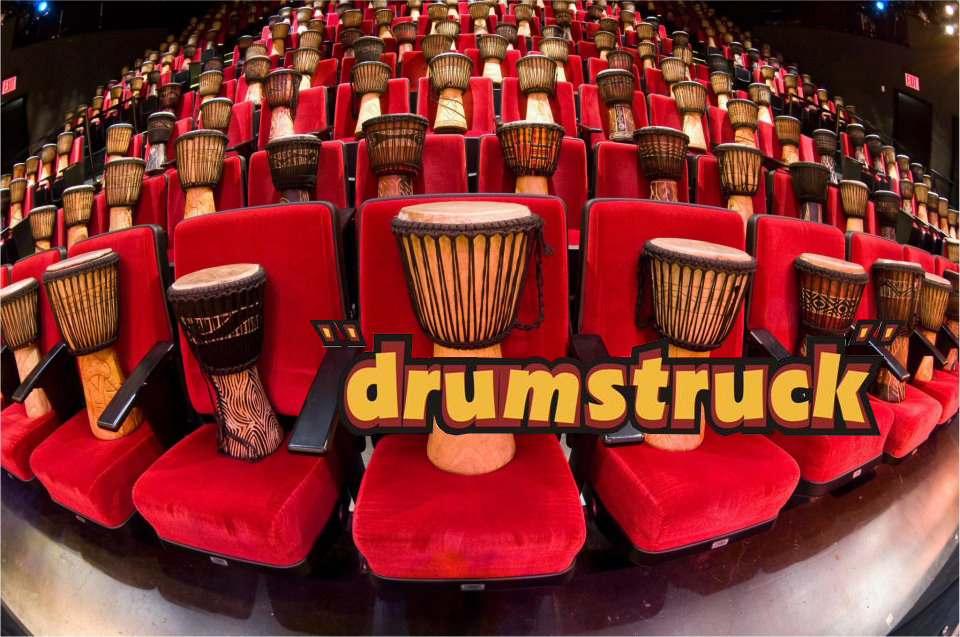
Drumstruck is the first interactive drumming theatre production of its kind

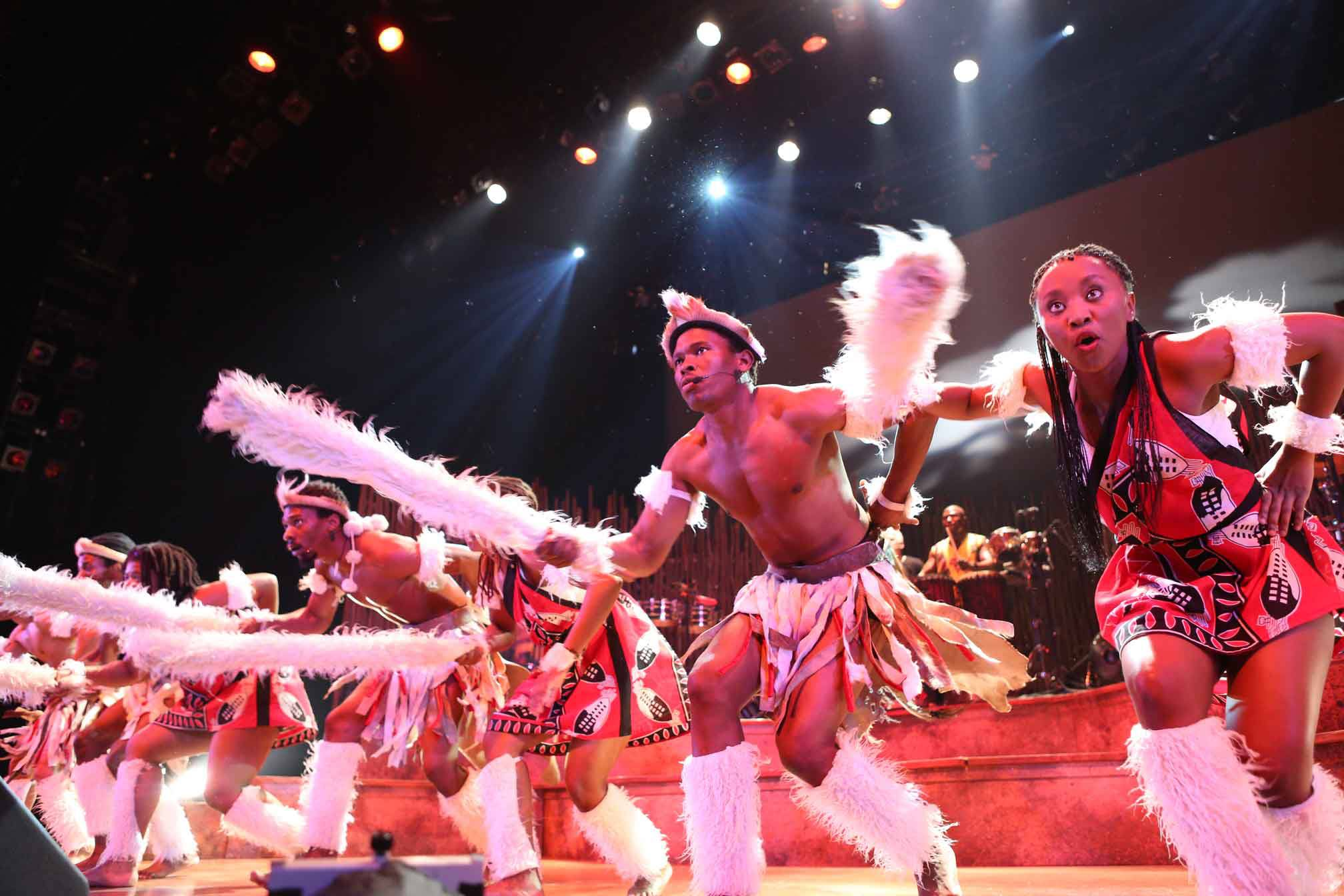
Drumstruck includes many South African cultural scenes

Drumstruck played 40 previews and 607 regular shows from May 2005 to November 2006 to sell out Dodger Stages audiences. It took its audiences on a journey through South Africa through drums, gumboot dancing, zulu dancing and song. Each audience member was provided with their own djembe and played and sang along with the show, representing the sharing of music present in African music. The show also featured eleven South African performers dressed in traditional clothing including: Tiny Modise, Africa Djane, Ayanda, Sebone Rangata, Enoch Mahlangu, Richard Carter, Molutsi Mogami, Ronald Medupe, Nomvula Gerashe, Sponch Mogapi, Simon Letsoela and one American performer, LeeAnet Noble. Anthony Caplan composed some of the music, notebly the Drum Finale.

Drumstruck has toured in Japan every year since 2008. In 2008, Drumstruck toured China, Nanjing International Theatre Festival and performed some Drumstruck elements during the Beijing Olympics opening ceremony.

In 2009 Drumstruck toured Japan – two weeks in Tokyo and three weeks touring around Japan. In 2010, members of Drumstruck performed with Shakira, K’Naan at FIFA World Cup Concert, in Japan – 2 weeks in Tokyo – 3 weeks touring around Japan and South Africa during FIFA world Cup. In 2011 and 2012 Drumstruck toured Japan to sold-out tours of five weeks.

== Background ==
In 1997 the Drum Cafe set up shop in Greenside Johannesburg, as a musical showcase for traditional musicians, as well as a space where drummers could meet and jam together in a small soundproof room. Some of the first people to perform there were Waddy Jones from Die Antwoord, Neo Muyanga from Blk Sonshine. The drumming caught on and Drum Cafe performed their first team building event in October 1997 to unite people from different races in corporate South Africa. Between 1997 and 2002 Drum Cafe performed thousands of drumming events around South Africa. In 2002, because of the demand, Drumstruck was written in order to open the show to audiences outside of the corporate world. The first show was at the Theatre on Mandela square in Johannesburg.

== See also ==
- Stomp (dance troupe)
