= Runaround (British game show) =

British TV children's game show (1975–1981)

- Also known as: Poparound (1985–86)
- Genre: Children's game show
- Created by: Merrill Heatter & Bob Quigley
- Presented by: Mike Reid; Leslie Crowther; Stan Boardman; Gary Crowley (Poparound)
- Country of origin: United Kingdom
- Original language: English
- No. of series: 12 (Runaround); 2 (Poparound)
- No. of episodes: 100 (inc. 3 specials) (Runaround); 12 (Poparound)

Production
- Running time: 30 minutes (inc. adverts)
- Production companies: Southern Television (Runaround); Central (Poparound)

Original release
- Network: ITV
- Release: 2 September 1975 – 7 September 1981 (Runaround)
- Release: 19 June 1985 – 4 June 1986 (Poparound)

Related
- Runaround

Runaround is a children's game show produced by Southern Television for the ITV network between 2 September 1975 and 7 September 1981. It was much more successful than the original American version.

The original host was comedian Mike Reid. In 1977 his place was taken by Leslie Crowther and Stan Boardman, before Reid returned in 1978. The ball in tube scoring was copied from the US version but with two colours; red worth one point for a correct answer and yellow worth two points for being the only contestant to choose the right answer (this was reversed in later series). Metal Mickey made his screen debut on the British version of the show after being discovered by the show's in-vision researcher, Tim Edmunds.

The series ended when Southern Television's franchise ended at the end of 1981. The game was also incorporated into the two series of the short-lived ITV Saturday morning show Saturday Banana hosted by Bill Oddie from 1978.

A spin-off entitled Poparound was produced by Central and aired between 19 June 1985 and 4 June 1986 with Gary Crowley as the host.

== Transmissions ==
=== Runaround ===
Series	Start date	End date	Episodes
1	2 September 1975	7 October 1975	6
CS1	26 December 1975		1
2	13 January 1976	24 February 1976	7
3	31 March 1976	5 May 1976	6
4	18 August 1976	29 September 1976	7
CS2	27 December 1976		1
5	12 April 1977	12 July 1977	13
6	23 November 1977	4 January 1978	7
7	28 March 1978	2 May 1978	5
8	4 August 1978	8 September 1978	6
9	22 May 1979	31 July 1979	10
CS3	24 December 1979		1
10	13 June 1980	19 September 1980	13
11	25 December 1980	25 March 1981	14
12	27 July 1981	7 September 1981	6

Out of 103 episodes from 12 series that were made during its 6-year run, 33 survived from the archives, which included Episode 4 of Series 8, Episodes 5 & 9 of Series 9, The 1979 Christmas Special, Episodes 1, 3–5, 7–8 & 10–13 of Series 10, Episodes 1–7 & 9–14 of Series 11 and all 6 episodes of Series 12.

=== Poparound ===
Series	Start date	End date	Episodes
1	19 June 1985	24 July 1985	6
2	30 April 1986	4 June 1986	6
