= Jump start (disambiguation) =

Jump start is a method of starting an automobile.

It may also refer to:

- Jump start (motorsport)
- Operation Jump Start

== Arts and entertainment ==
- Jump Start (comic strip), a daily comic strip by cartoonist Robb Armstrong
- "Jump Start", a song by Greg Howe from his 1993 album Introspection
- "Jump Start", a song by The Hang Ups that appeared in the 1997 film Chasing Amy
- "Jump Start", a song by Natalie Cole from her 1987 album Everlasting
- "Jump Start", a song by Jethro Tull on the album Crest of a Knave
- "Jump Start" (Casualty), a 1986 television episode

== Organizations ==
- Jumpstart for Young Children, a nonprofit organization
- Jump$tart Coalition for Personal Financial Literacy, a non-profit organization
- Jumpstart (Jewish), a California organization

== Technology ==
- JumpStart, an educational software series
- JumpStart (Solaris), a computer network installation tool
- Jumpstart Technologies

== Other uses ==
- Jumpstart, a space mission of the United States Operationally Responsive Space Office

== See also ==
- Jumper (disambiguation)
- Jumper cable, electric cables which connect two rail or road vehicles
