= Kvant (magazine) =

Russian science magazine

- Categories: Physics, mathematics
- Founded: 1970
- Final issue: 2011 (print)
- Country: Soviet Union; Russia
- Based in: Moscow
- Language: Russian

Kvant (Russian: Квант for "quantum") is a popular science magazine in physics and mathematics for school students and teachers, issued in print between 1970 and 2011. The magazine became an online-only publication in 2011. Translation of selected articles from Kvant had been published in Quantum Magazine in 1990–2001, which in turn had been translated and published in Greece in 1994–2001.

== History ==
Kvant was started as a joint project of the USSR Academy of Sciences and USSR Academy of Pedagogical Sciences. In Soviet time, it was published by Nauka publisher with circulation about 200,000.

The idea of the magazine was introduced by Pyotr Kapitsa. Its first chief editors were physicist Isaak Kikoin and mathematician Andrei Kolmogorov. In 1985, its editorial board had 18 Academicians and Corresponding Members of the USSR Academy of Sciences and USSR Academy of Pedagogical Sciences, 14 Doctors of Sciences and 20 Candidates of Science.

The last print issue of Kvant was published at the beginning of 2011. Then the print edition was closed making the magazine an online publication.

== Availability ==
All published issues of Kvant were freely available online.

== Translations ==
=== Quantum Magazine ===
Quantum Magazine was a US-based bimonthly magazine published by the National Science Teachers Association (NSTA) from 1990 to 2001. Some of its articles were translations from Kvant.

=== Kvant Selecta ===
In 1999, American Mathematical Society published translation of selected articles from Kvant on algebra and mathematical analysis as two volumes in the Mathematical World series. Yet another volume, published in 2002, included translation of selected articles on combinatorics.

=== Other translations ===
There were two books with selected articles from Kvant published in France by Jean-Michel Kantor
