= Jump (Lil Durk song) =

Single by Lil Durk-King Von-Booka600 Ft.Memo600 (2021)

Single by Lil Durk, King Von, and Booka600 featuring Memo600

from the album Loyal Bros
- Released: March 3, 2021
- Genre: Drill
- Length: 3:12
- Label: Only the Family; Empire
- Songwriters: Durk Banks; Dayvon Bennett; Darontez Mayo; Melvin Griffin
- Producers: Jenu McLucas, RMG Nu

Lil Durk singles chronology
"Love You Too" (2021)	"Jump" (2021)	"Voice of the Heroes" (2021)

King Von singles chronology
"Rose Gold" (2021)	"Jump" (2021)	"Nobody Move" (2021)

Music video
- "Jump" on YouTube

"Jump" is a song by American rapper Lil Durk in collaboration with late fellow rapper King Von and featuring Chicago rappers Booka600 and Memo600. It was released on March 3, 2021, as the sixth and final single from Only The Family's fourth compilation album, Loyal Bros (2021). Two days ahead of the album's release. "Jump" debuted and peaked at number 9 on the US Billboard Bubbling Under Hot 100 chart.

== Background ==
Lil Durk and his collective, Only The Family, released their album "Loyal Bros." The album features collaborations with notable artists such as Lil Uzi Vert, Tee Grizzley, EST Gee, and Foogiano, among several others.

King Von, which was a member of Lil Durk's "OTF" (Only The Family) collective, died on November 6, 2020. Despite his untimely death, he had recorded a verse for "Jump," one of the main tracks featured on the album. The cover art of "Loyal Bros" album pays homage to the late King Von himself and to the late OTF Nunu, Durk's cousin. Prior to the tape's and track release, Durk acquired a set of Von memory tags designed by New York-based jeweler Izzy of NYC Luxury Co. The rapper showcased these designs on Instagram, which Izzy described as a "30 pointer tennis chain" adorned with "all VVS E color stones."

In addition to "Jump", King Von also contributes verses to the tracks "Me and Doodie Lo" and "Out the Roof" on the tape.

== Composition ==
"Jump" serves as the invigorating opening track of the tape, featuring Lil Durk, Memo600, Booka600, and a captivating verse from the late King Von. This minor key ballad encapsulates the brotherly camaraderie that defines OTF. The song serves as a mission statement for the entire tape, with Durk, Memo, and Booka exchanging bars that emphasize the importance of loyalty and their commitment to creating music for those entrenched in difficult situations. Booka600 and Memo600 initiate the track with a seamless give-and-go verse, demonstrating their complementary mindsets and chemistry. Following their performance, King Von and Lil Durk conclude the song with impactful verses. King Von's full-length verse stands as the centerpiece of the song, showcasing one of his legendary narratives about the consequences of misplaced trust.

== Music video ==
Directed by Crownsoheavy, the video for "Jump" is divided into two distinct parts, seamlessly intertwining the narratives. One segment features Booka and Memo celebrating their achievements at an apartment party, surrounded by money, women, and red cups. As the party unfolds, Booka departs to deliver money to King Von, creating a bittersweet moment in the clip. Meanwhile, King Von engages with a supplier during what appears to be a business deal. As the currency changes hands, Lil Durk nearby, rapping his verse from the backseat, adds major cinematic elements and storytelling in the video while showcasing his jewelry and cruising in his newly acquired Rolls Royce. This juxtaposition highlights the contrast between the lively gangsta house party and the tense midnight rendezvous between two jittery gangs.

== Charts ==
Chart (2021)	Peak position
US Bubbling Under Hot 100 (Billboard)	9
