= Jump (surname) =

Jump is a surname. Notable people with the surname include:

- Edward Jump (1832–1883), artist and cartoonist in Paris and California
- Gage Jump (born 2003), American baseball player
- Gordon Jump (1932–2003), American actor
- Harry Jump (1914–1989), American politician
- Jimmy Jump (born 1976), Spanish streaker
- Russell Jump (1895–2000), American politician
- Samuel Vaughn Jump, American physician and politician
- Stewart Jump (born 1952), English footballer
