= Michael Schanze =

German television presenter and singer

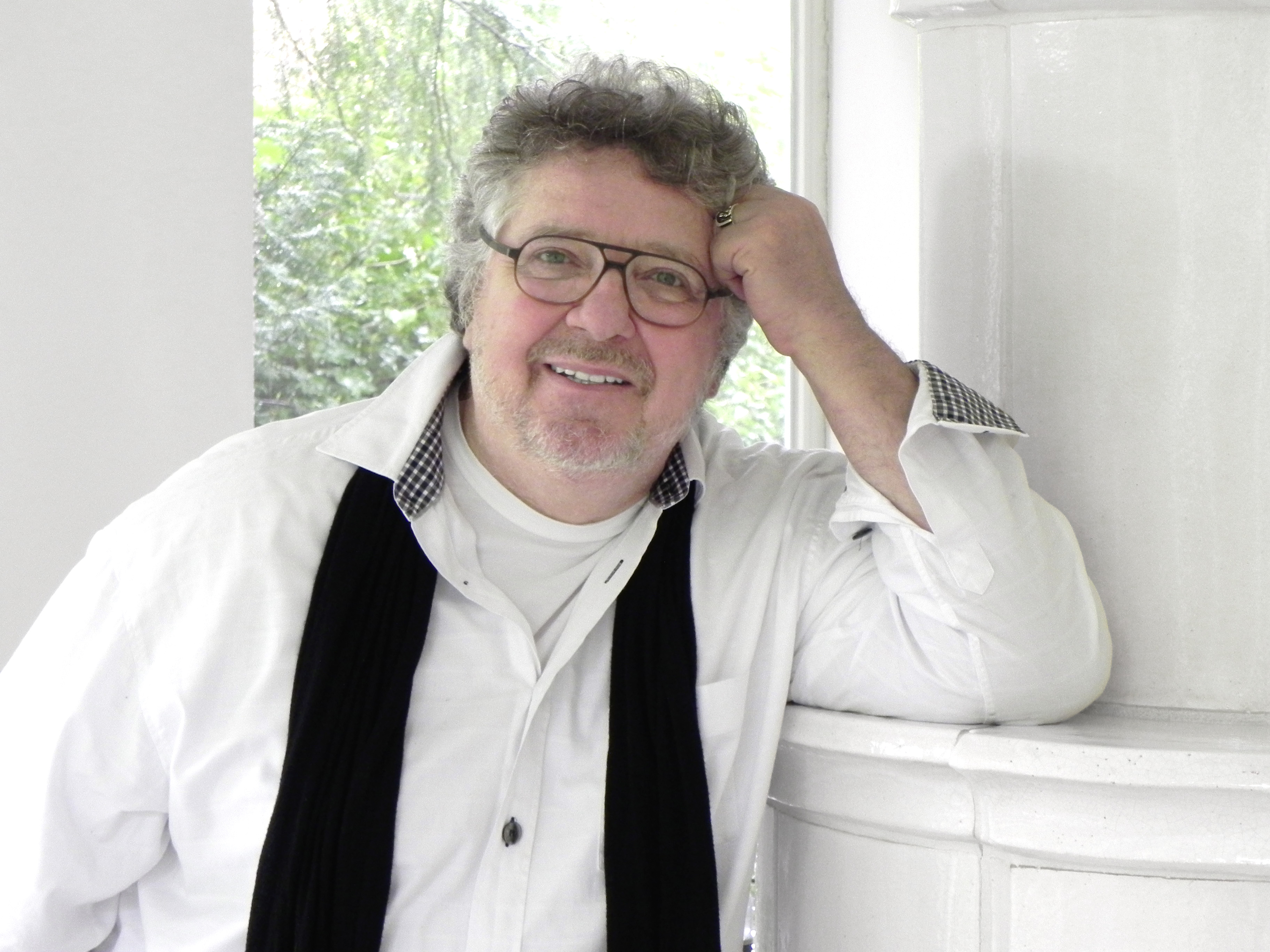
- Schanze in 2016
- Born: 15 January 1947 (age 79); Tutzing, Germany
- Occupations: Television presenter, singer
- Children: 3
- Website: michael-schanze.de

Michael Schanze (born 15 January 1947 in Tutzing) is a German television presenter and singer.

== Life ==
Schanze studied from 1967 to 1970 at University of Television and Film Munich. Schanze works as television presenter on German broadcasters. He is also a singer of Schlager songs. Schanze has been divorced since 2000 and has three sons.

== Filmography ==
=== Television ===
- 1972: 'Hätten Sie heut Zeit für mich?
- 1977–1985: 1, 2 oder 3
- 1983: Start ins Glück (ARD)
- 1985–1988: Telefant
- 1988–1995: Flitterabend
- 1989: Spiel ohne Grenzen
- Michael-Schanze-Show (ZDF)
- Wir warten auf's Christkind
- Showexpress
- Mobile
- Kinderquatsch mit Michael
- Nur keine Hemmungen
- Herzlichen Glückwunsch
- Telezirkus
- Wunderland

=== Films ===
- 1971: Außer Rand und Band am Wolfgangsee, director: Franz Antel
- 1972: Sie nannten ihn Krambambuli, director: Franz Antel
- 1972: The Merry Quartet from the Filling Station, director: Franz Antel
- 1983: Lass das – ich hass' das, director: Horst Hächler
- 2010: Dahoam is Dahoam (TV series)

== Songs ==
- 1968: Ich bin kein Lord and Es muss nicht Frühling sein
- 1970: Ich hab dich lieb
- 1971: Solang wir zwei uns lieben
- 1971: Wer dich sieht, hat dich lieb
- 1972: Oh wie wohl ist mir
- 1972: Sonntag im Zoo
- 1973: Wo du bist, will ich sein
- 1973: Ich lass dich nie mehr aus den Augen
- 1975: Du hast geweint
- 1975: Hell wie ein Diamant
- 1976: Nie mehr
- 1976: Es ist morgen und ich liebe dich noch immer
- 1977: Ich bin dein Freund
- 1978: Schalt mal dein Herz auf Empfang – Song of ARD-Fernsehlotterie
- 1978: Sonne scheint in alle Herzen
- 1982: Olé España (D #10) – together with Germany national football team
- 1982: Wie ich dich liebe

== Awards ==
- 1973 – Bambi
- 1975 – Bravo Otto in Bronze, category TV moderator
- 1980 – Bambi
- 1990 – Bambi
- 1995 – Telestar Beste Moderation Unterhaltung for „Flitterabend“
