= Jump (theatrical show) =

Jump, made by Kyung-Hoon Kim, is a South Korean comedic theatrical performance involving martial arts, acrobatics, and dance moves. The musical "Jump", which was first performed in 2003, has recorded more than 7,000 performances and more than three million tickets was sold. More than 70 percent of domestic "Jump" visitors are foreigners. It also has a private theater in Seoul, South Korea

== Plot ==
The plot involves a Korean family in Seoul preparing for a suitor for the daughter's hand. The family's efforts are at first frustrated by a drunken uncle and then by two bungling burglars. The suitor is a meek young man except when his glasses are removed. Thereupon, he is transformed into a martial arts power-house.

== Performances ==
"JUMP" is the most famous comic martial art performance in Korea. The production company is Yegam Productions. Jump lasts about one hundred minutes. Besides performances in South Korea, Jump has been performed at various venues and places around the world, including:

- 2005 Edinburgh Fringe Festival (where it garnered the top box office award);
- London;
- New York City;
- Bangkok;
- South Africa;
- 2015 India (Korean Festival Delhi);
- 2016 Hongkong;
- 2016 Japan;
- 2016 Indonesia;
- 2016 2017 Taiwan;
- 2017 Naples;
- 2017 Madrid;
- 2017 Sweden;
- 2017 Singapore.

== Cast ==
The cast has included (in South Korea): Grandfather, Father, Mother, Daughter, Uncle, Son-in-low, Thief 1, Thief 2, Old Man.
