= Quantum jump =

1913 model of abrupt transitions of quantum systems

A quantum jump is the abrupt transition of a quantum system (atom, molecule, atomic nucleus) from one quantum state to another, from one energy level to another. When the system absorbs energy, there is a transition to a higher energy level (excitation); when the system loses energy, there is a transition to a lower energy level.

The concept was introduced by Niels Bohr, in his 1913 Bohr model.

A quantum jump is a phenomenon that is peculiar to quantum systems and distinguishes them from classical systems, where any transitions are performed gradually. In quantum mechanics, such jumps are associated with the non-unitary evolution of a quantum-mechanical system during measurement.

A quantum jump can be accompanied by the emission or absorption of photons; energy transfer during a quantum jump can also occur by non-radiative resonant energy transfer or in collisions with other particles.

In modern physics, the concept of a quantum jump is rarely used; as a rule scientists speak of transitions between quantum states or energy levels.

== Atomic electron transition ==
Grotrian diagram of a quantum 3-level system with characteristic transition frequencies, $\omega$_{12} and $\omega$_{13}, and excited state lifetimes $\Gamma$_{2} and $\Gamma$_{3}

Atomic electron transitions cause the emission or absorption of photons. Their statistics are Poissonian, and the time between jumps is exponentially distributed. The damping time constant (which ranges from nanoseconds to a few seconds) relates to the natural, pressure, and field broadening of spectral lines. The larger the energy separation of the states between which the electron jumps, the shorter the wavelength of the photon emitted.

EMCCD camera and photomultiplier tube signals while driving quantum jumps on the 674 nm transition of ^{88}Sr^{+}

In an ion trap, quantum jumps can be directly observed by addressing a trapped ion with radiation at two different frequencies to drive electron transitions. This requires one strong and one weak transition to be excited (denoted $\omega$_{12} and $\omega$_{13} respectively in the figure to the right). The electron energy level, $|2\rangle$, has a short lifetime, $\Gamma$_{2} which allows for constant emission of photons at a frequency $\omega$_{12} which can be collected by a camera and/or photomultiplier tube. State $|3\rangle$ has a relatively long lifetime $\Gamma$_{3} which causes an interruption of the photon emission as the electron gets shelved in state through application of light with frequency $\omega$_{13.} The ion going dark is a direct observation of quantum jumps.

== Sources ==
- Are there quantum jumps?
- «There are no quantum jumps, nor are there particles!» by H. D. Zeh, Physics Letters A172, 189 (1993).
- Gleick, James Gleick (October 21, 1986). "Physicists Finally Get To See the Quantum Jump". New York Times. New York City.
- Der Quantensprung im Bohrschen Atommodell Frühe Quantenphysik
- Der Quantensprung Die zweifelhafte Karriere eines Fachausdrucks (ZEIT 1996)
- M.B. Plenio und P.L. Knight The Quantum Jump Approach to Dissipative Dynamics in Quantum Optics, vgl. auch Rev. Mod. Phys. 70 101–144 (1998). (Beschreibung der Dynamik offener Systeme mittels Quantensprüngen)
- Historisches zum Quantensprung, Sommerfeld und Einstein 1911
