= Quantum (disambiguation) =

A quantum is the minimum amount of any physical entity involved in an interaction in physics. (See also Quantum mechanics.)

Quantum may also refer to:

== Science ==
- Quantum, in neuroscience, refers to a discrete component of a physiological response
- Quantum Magazine, a physics and science magazine
- Quantum (journal), an open-access journal for research articles on quantum science
- Quantum (TV series), a half-hour science journalism series aired by the Australian Broadcasting Corporation between 1985 and 2001

== Businesses and products ==
- Quantum Corporation, a manufacturer of computer data storage products
- Quantum Sports Cars, a British-built low-volume car manufacturer
- Toyota Quantum, the South African-specification version of the Toyota HiAce.
- Volkswagen Quantum
- Quantum, a line of Maksutov telescopes that were manufactured by Optical Techniques Incorporated (OTI)
- Quantum, line of small engines made by Briggs & Stratton
- Quantum-class cruise ship
- Pegasus Quantum, a British-built ultralight trike

== Computing ==
- QUANTUM, a suite of attack software by the US National Security Agency (NSA)
- QGIS, an open source GIS program for map-drawing and related functions, formerly called Quantum GIS
- A time slice in computer pre-emptive multitasking
- Quantum (software) a project of Mozilla to improve its Firefox web browser engine

== Fiction and entertainment ==
- Quantum (James Bond), the villainous organization featured in Casino Royale and Quantum of Solace
- Quantum (book), a science history book by Manjit Kumar
- Quantum Science Fiction, a line of books published by Dial Press from 1977 to 1981
- Quantum, a ride at Thorpe Park
- Quantum (album), an album by Planet X
- Quantum (comics), a comic book character
- Quantum (video game), an arcade game released by Atari in 1982
- Quantum (2010 video game), a video game developed by Team Tachyon and published by Tecmo for the PlayStation 3
- Quantum International, a defunct American company specialized in producing infomercials

== See also ==
- Quanta (disambiguation)
- Kvant (disambiguation), from Russian Квант, meaning quantum
