= Entertainments National Service Association =

Organisation providing entertainment for British armed forces personnel during WWII

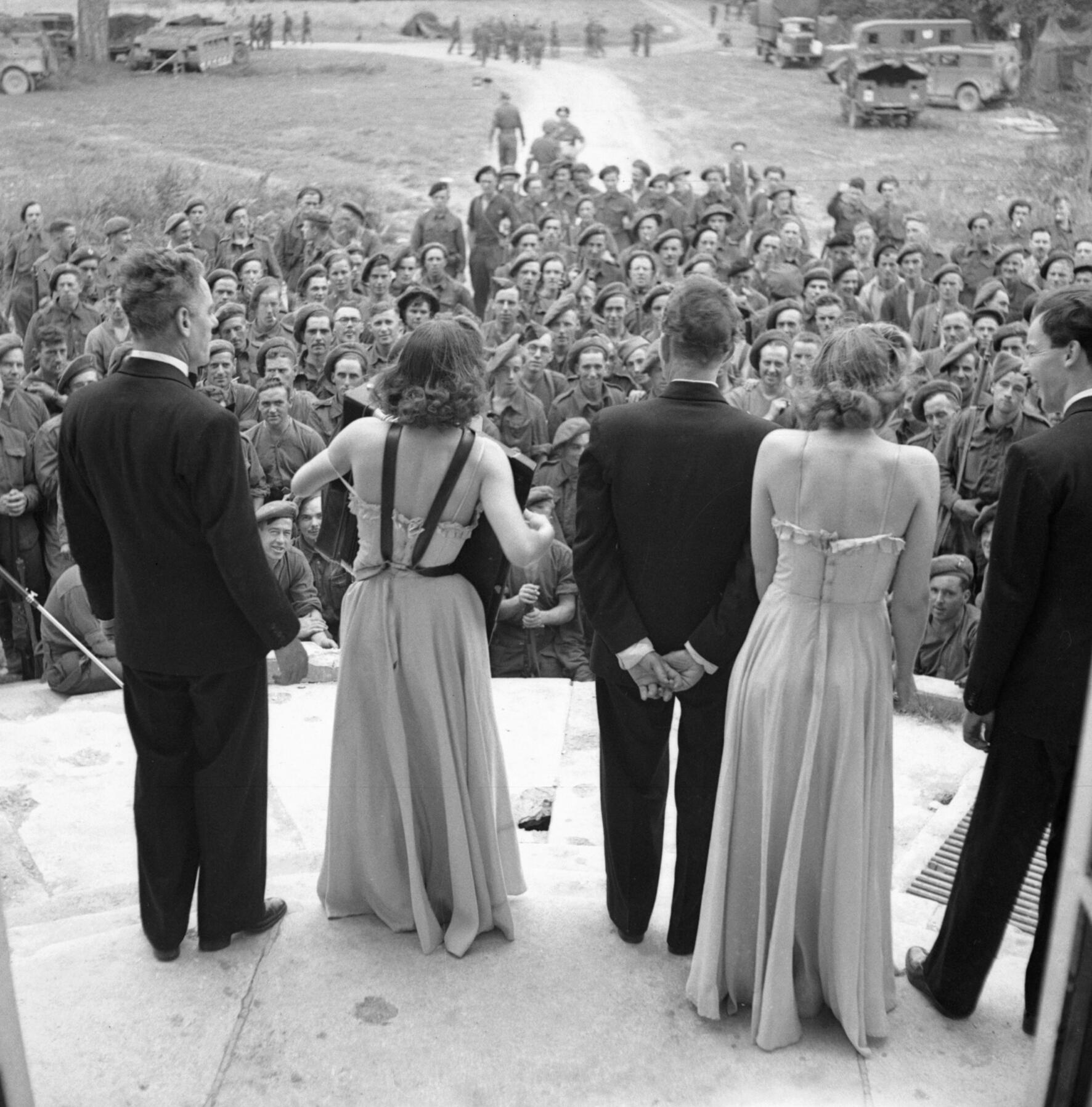
An ENSA concert party entertaining troops from the steps of a chateau in Normandy, 26 July 1944

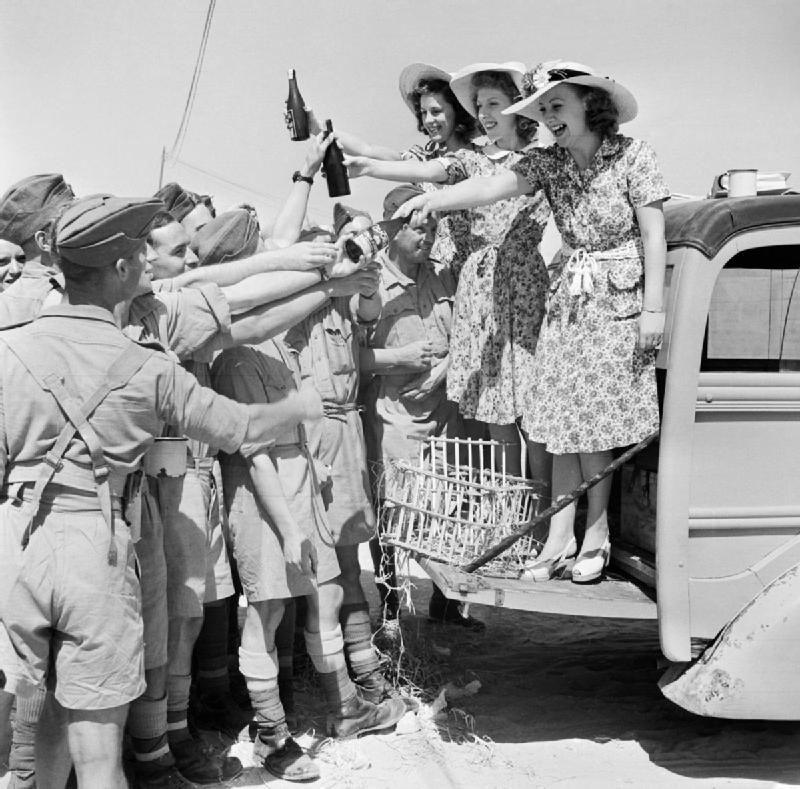
ENSA Glamour Girls distribute cigarettes and beer to troops in North Africa, 26 July 1942.

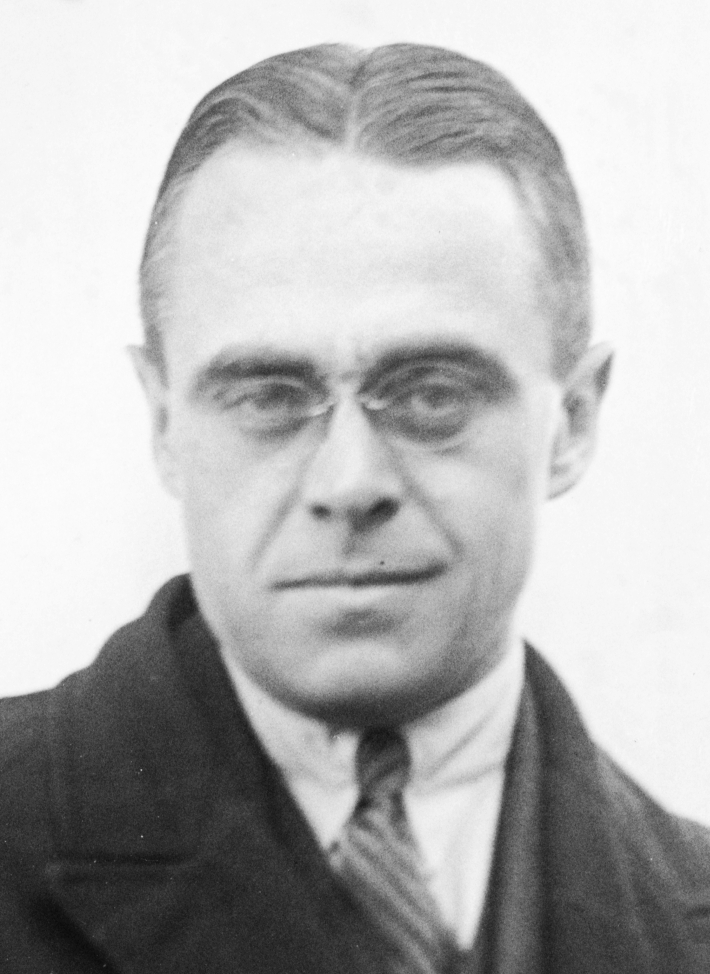
The founders of the ENSA, Basil Dean (above) and Leslie Henson (below)

The Entertainments National Service Association (ENSA) was an organisation established in 1939 by Basil Dean and Leslie Henson to provide entertainment for the personnel of the British Armed Forces during World War II. ENSA operated as part of the Navy, Army and Air Force Institutes. In 1946 it was re-named to Combined Services Entertainment (CSE) operating under the Services Sound and Vision Corporation (SSVC), until 2 March 2020, when the SSVC re-branded to the British Forces Broadcasting Service (BFBS), with the CSE likewise re-branding as BFBS Live Events.

The first big wartime variety concert organised by ENSA was broadcast by the BBC to the Empire and local networks from RAF Hendon in north London on 17 October 1939. Among the entertainers appearing on the bill were Adelaide Hall, The Western Brothers and Mantovani. A newsreel of this concert showing Hall singing "We're Going to Hang out the Washing on the Siegfried Line" accompanied by Mantovani and His Orchestra exists.

Many members of ENSA later had careers in the entertainment industry after the war, including actors Terry-Thomas, Peter Sellers and Kenneth Connor.

Tap and acrobatic dancer Vivienne Hole, stage name Vivienne Fayre, a civilian aged 19, was the only ENSA member killed in the war. On 23 January 1945 in Normandy, she was being driven between shows as a passenger aboard a truck carrying stage scenery which strayed into a minefield. She was buried with full military honours in Sittard War Cemetery.

== In popular culture ==
Despite many extremely talented entertainers working for ENSA, the organisation was necessarily spread thin over the vast area it had to cover. Thus many entertainments were substandard, and the popular translation of the acronym ENSA was "Every Night Something Awful".

ENSA plays a modest role in the film Love Story (1944) in which Margaret Lockwood stars as a concert pianist who makes an ENSA tour to North Africa and the Mediterranean region. The film Desert Mice (1959) follows the fictional escapades of an ENSA troop with Sid James assigned to the Afrika Korps.

The only known ENSA theatre to have survived in its original condition is the Garrison Theatre at Hurst Castle in the New Forest National Park. Created by servicemen in 1939, the proscenium arch still bears the badge and grenades of the Royal Artillery, and the curtains still hang from an original galvanised gas pipe. Shows are presented from time to time by the Friends of Hurst Castle.

In episode 7 of season 6 of the British science fiction time travel sitcom Goodnight Sweetheart, Gary and Phoebe join ENSA and travel to Belgium to entertain the allied troops, accidentally getting trapped behind enemy lines.

== Partial list of performers ==
- Inga Andersen
- Avril Angers
- Hermione Baddeley
- John Barbirolli
- Nelson Lloyd (Ventriloquist)
- Marie Burke
- Helen Clare
- Kenneth Connor
- Noël Coward
- Peter Cushing
- Bebe Daniels
- Alice Delysia
- Lyle Evans
- Gracie Fields
- George Formby
- Forsythe, Seamon and Farrell
- Will Fyfe
- Joyce Grenfell
- Beryl Grey
- Geraldo
- Sonnie Hale
- Adelaide Hall
- Richard Hearne
- Myra Hess
- Stanley Holloway
- Frankie Howerd
- Gertrude Lawrence
- Mary Lee
- Cheryl Lind
- Vera Lynn
- Jessie Matthews
- Helen Norman
- Laurence Olivier
- Mantovani
- Ivor Novello
- Lennard Pearce
- Bob and Alf Pearson
- Jack Radcliffe
- Arthur Riscoe
- Thelma Ruby
- Peter Sellers
- Terry-Thomas
- Hazel Vincent Wallace
- The Western Brothers
- Diana Wynyard
- Wilfrid Brambell
