= The Prince of Atlantis =

- Genre: Action/Adventure; Drama; Fantasy; Science fiction
- Created by: Jacques Peyrache
- Written by: Chris Trengove; Dennys McCoy; Pamela Hickey; Jean-Francois Henry; Henry Steiman
- Directed by: Patrick Clerc
- Starring: Tom Clarke-Hill; Victor Spinetti; Eric Meyers; Bill Zorn (actor); Regine Candler; Tom Eastwood; Gary Shelford; Lorraine Parsloe; Sally Low-Hurry
- Theme music composer: Mark Russell
- Composer: Mark Russell
- Country of origin: United Kingdom
- Original language: English
- No. of seasons: 1
- No. of episodes: 26

Production
- Executive producers: Theresa Plummer-Andrews; Rolf Ernst
- Producer: Mike Young
- Running time: 30 min.
- Production companies: BBC Worldwide; Ravensburger Film + TV; Pixibox

Original release
- Network: BBC1; BBC2
- Release: 7 January – 10 September 1997

The Prince of Atlantis is a British children's animated television series about a group of underwater creatures that protect the oceans.

== Synopsis ==
In the heart of the ocean, in the mysterious waters of the Bermuda Triangle, is a beautiful city built by the legendary people of Atlantis. Its sole inhabitant is a child, the prince Akata, the last of the Atlanteans. With him in the underwater city lies all the knowledge, technology and the extraordinary powers accumulated by the people for 5000 years. But modern technologies threaten the city: men with sophisticated machinery plumb the depths of the ocean in order to extract its riches. Akata, with the help of the hologram of his master, Shum, and the ray-like mermaid Oya, must protect the Atlantean heritage, particularly the Blue Ray, from falling into the wrong hands.

== Broadcast ==
It premiered on the BBC as part of their children's block CBBC and originally aired from 7 January to 1 April 1997 and later for further more episodes from 25 June to 10 September of the same year running for only 26 episodes. After the series was cancelled, it continued to air on the BBC until 2003. It also later aired on The Children's Channel on cable television and was broadcast in several countries worldwide such as TV2 in New Zealand, SRF zwei in Switzerland as well as various other German and Austrian channels such as Nickelodeon, ProSieben, Junior and ORF eins, 8TV (originally called MetroVision) in Malaysia, Univision in America as part of La Piñata Loca, Bahrain Channel 55 in Bahrain, Channel 5 in Singapore, Sjónvarpið in Iceland, M-Net in South Africa with the series being shown on their programming block for children called K-T.V., Canal 5 in Mexico and RTÉ2 in the Republic of Ireland as part of their children's block The Den and on military television on BFBS and its former network SSVC being shown on both of their children's wrapper programmes Room 785 and Children's SSVC in some countries such as Germany and the Falkland Islands.

== Response ==
In July 2002 the series was the most watched programme on CBBC that week, with 70,000 viewers.

== Episodes ==
No.	Title	Original release date
1	"A New Life"	7 January 1997
2	"The Spirits of the Ancestors"	14 January 1997
3	"Caphira One"	21 January 1997
4	"The Two Faced Traitor"	28 January 1997
5	"The Curse of the Crystal Tombs"	4 February 1997
6	"The Big Fin"	18 February 1997
7	"The Demons of the Glacier"	25 February 1997
8	"Dagon's Anger"	4 March 1997
9	"Journey to the Stars"	11 March 1997
10	"The Visitors"	18 March 1997
11	"King of the Headwaters"	25 March 1997
12	"Countdown to Doomsday"	1 April 1997
13	"Mirror of Dreams"	25 June 1997
14	"Disappearing Seas"	9 July 1997
15	"Leviathan"	11 July 1997
16	"Fountain of Life"	16 July 1997
17	"The Return of Captain Baha"	23 July 1997
18	"Hot Water"	30 July 1997
19	"Ghost Ship"	6 August 1997
20	"A Heavy Metal"	8 August 1997
21	"The Dark Knight"	13 August 1997
22	"Revolt of the Machines"	20 August 1997
23	"Toxic Timebomb"	27 August 1997
24	"Life of a Friend"	29 August 1997
25	"Checkmate"	3 September 1997
26	"The Return of the Atlanteans"	10 September 1997
