= Alastair Duncan (British Army officer) =

Major General Alastair Duncan CBE DSO
- Born: 22 October 1952; Toft Monks, Norfolk
- Died: 24 July 2016 (aged 63)
- Military career
- Allegiance: United Kingdom
- Branch: British Army
- Service years: 1972–2005
- Rank: Major General
- Unit: The Prince of Wales's Own Regiment of Yorkshire
- Commands: Director-General of Training Support; 19th Mechanised Brigade; The Prince of Wales's Own Regiment of Yorkshire
- Conflicts: The Troubles; UNPROFOR; UNAMSIL
- Awards: Commander of the Order of the British Empire; Companion of the Distinguished Service Order
- Other work: Managing Director of Services Sound and Vision Corporation

Major General Alastair David Arton Duncan CBE DSO (22 October 1952 – 24 July 2016) was a British army officer. He is best known for his service as Commanding Officer of The Prince of Wales's Own Regiment of Yorkshire whilst in the Balkans, Chief of Staff of the United Nations Mission in Sierra Leone, and Director-General of Training Support.

== Early life and education ==
Duncan was born on 22 October 1952 in Toft Monks, Norfolk, England. From 1961 to 1970, he was educated at Gresham's School, a private boarding school in Holt, Norfolk.

== Military career ==
On 10 March 1973, having attended Royal Military Academy Sandhurst, Duncan was commissioned into The Prince of Wales's Own Regiment of Yorkshire (PWO), British Army, as a second lieutenant with seniority from 8 March 1973. Duncan eventually rose to command the regiment in 1990 as a lieutenant-colonel, and would lead the PWO through two deployments. The first was to Northern Ireland in 1992 to fight in the Troubles, with Duncan appointed an Officer in the Order of the British Empire for his performance in command. The second was in 1993 to Bosnia as part of UNPFOR. It was here that Major-General Duncan was awarded the Distinguished Service Order for his leadership in action, with the Telegraph calling him "instrumental in the rescue of 200 Croats...". After the tour he was commissioned as a commander of the 19th Mechanised Brigade in Germany and Catterick, where he commanded 19th Mechanized Brigade and Catterick Garrison. He then took up a position in the Ministry of Defence as Director of Land Warfare.

In 2000 he was appointed Chief of Staff of the United Nations Mission in Sierra Leone (UNAMSIL). UNAMSIL would eventually result in the disarming of more than 75,000 fighters. It rebuilt the country's police force and paved the way to democratic elections. Though stepping down from this position in 2001 to take up his final role in the military as Director-General of Training Support, the United Nations mission was completed in 2005, and Duncan was invested as a Commander of the Order of the British Empire for his efforts. In 2005, Major-General Duncan retired from the army after 33 years of service.

== Later life ==
From 2005 to 2009, he was Managing Director of Services Sound and Vision Corporation, a British charity that runs entertainment services for the British Armed Forces including the British Forces Broadcasting Service and the Combined Services Entertainment.

In 2013, Duncan was "sectioned under the Mental Health Act and confined in a secure mental facility". He died on 24 July 2016, aged 63, having suffered a perforated ulcer.

== Personal life ==
Duncan was married three times and had three children. His first wife was Anita Keily, and together they had two sons; Thomas and Edward. They divorced in 1993. In 1995, he married Avril Walker, and together they had a daughter, Arabella. They divorced in 2008. In September 2013, he married for a third time to Ellen Le Brun, and she survives him.

=== Health ===
In 1993, during his posting to Bosnia, Duncan suffered a brain injury when the Warrior tracked armoured vehicle he was travelling in was damaged by a roadside bomb. He subsequently developed post-traumatic stress disorder (PTSD) in relation to the incident.
