= Room 785 =

British children's television programming block

Room 785 is a children's television programme broadcast on the BFBS 1 channel, part of the British Forces Broadcasting Service. It had a similar format to CBBC in that the presenters were situated in a small studio and introduced the programmes from there. There was more emphasis on emailing and texting in to the show, as it was broadcast wherever BFBS was received and allowed children to send messages to their parents who may have been on operations.

The show, which took its name from the British Forces Post Office number used as its address, was previously known as Children's SSVC. In 1985, it already included a birthday section.

Similar to the output of the BFBS channels in general, the show's broadcasts were taken directly from those shown on CBeebies CBBC, CITV and Channel 5. Historically, it aired on BFBS Forces Television, which was renamed BFBS 1 in 2001, but, with the introduction of BFBS 3 Kids in 2009, the show moved there.

== Programmes ==
=== 0-9 ===
- 50/50
- 64 Zoo Lane

=== A ===
- The Adventures of Captain Pugwash
- The Adventures of Jimmy Neutron, Boy Genius
- The Adventures of Paddington Bear
- Albie
- All Grown Up!
- All or Nothing
- Alphablocks
- Alvin and the Chipmunks
- The Amazing Adrenalini Brothers
- American Dragon: Jake Long
- Andy Pandy
- Angelina Ballerina
- Angelmouse
- The Angry Beavers
- Animaniacs
- Animal Stories
- Anthony Ant
- Archibald the Koala
- Art Attack
- Arthur
- Astro Boy
- Atomic Betty

=== B ===
- Balamory
- Barmy Aunt Boomerang
- The Baskervilles
- BB3B
- Beachcomber Bay
- The Beeps
- Bernard's Watch
- Big Meg, Little Meg
- Bill & Ben
- Blue Peter
- Bob the Builder
- Boogie Beebies
- Boohbah
- The Book of Pooh
- Brambly Hedge
- Brilliant Creatures
- The Brothers Flub

=== C ===
- Camp Lazlo
- Captain Scarlet and the Mysterons
- CardCaptors
- The Caribou Kitchen
- ChuckleVision
- Clarissa Explains It All
- Clifford the Big Red Dog
- The Cramp Twins
- Custer's Last Stand-up

=== D ===
- Dappledown Farm
- Dani's House
- Dennis the Menace (1996 series)
- Dennis the Menace (2009 series)
- Dick & Dom in da Bungalow
- Don't Eat the Neighbours
- Dr Otter
- Dream Street
- Driver Dan's Story Train

=== E ===
- Engie Benjy
- Enid Blyton's Enchanted Lands
- Everything's Rosie

=== F ===
- The Fairly OddParents
- Fanboy & Chum Chum
- Fat Dog Mendoza
- Fiddley Foodle Bird
- Fifi and the Flowertots
- Fimbles
- Fireman Sam
- Fleabag Monkeyface
- Fly Tales
- The Foxbusters
- Frankenstein's Cat
- Franklin
- Funnybones

=== G ===
- Gadget Boy & Heather
- Galidor: Defenders of the Outer Dimension
- Grange Hill
- The Greedysaurus Gang
- Grizzly Tales for Gruesome Kids

=== H ===
- Hey Arnold!
- Hilltop Hospital
- Home Farm Twins
- Horrid Henry
- How 2

=== I ===
- iCarly

=== J ===
- Jelly Jamm
- Jungle Run

=== K ===
- Kid vs. Kat
- Kipper

=== L ===
- The Lampies
- LazyTown
- Life Force
- The Likeaballs
- Little Bear
- Little Monsters
- Littlest Pet Shop
- Live and Kickin
- Looney Tunes

=== M ===
- Mad for It
- The Magic Key
- Maisy
- The Mask: Animated Series
- Max Steel
- MechaNick
- Mega Babies
- Meeow!
- Merlin the Magical Puppy
- Merrie Melodies
- Mickey Mouse Works
- Misery Guts
- Mist: Sheepdog Tales
- Mona the Vampire
- Monster TV
- Mortified
- Mopatop's Shop
- The Mr. Men Show
- Muffin the Mule
- Mumble Bumble
- The Mummy
- My Gym Partner's a Monkey
- My Parents are Aliens

=== N ===
- New Captain Scarlet
- Noah and Saskia

=== O ===
- The Octonauts
- OOglies

=== P ===
- Peppa Pig
- Pingu
- The Pinky and Perky Show
- Pinky and the Brain
- Plasmo
- Playdays
- Pocket Dragon Adventures
- Polterguests
- Postman Pat
- Postman Pat Special Delivery Service
- Potatoes and Dragons
- Preston Pig
- The Prince of Atlantis
- Pump It Up

=== Q ===
- The Quick Trick Show

=== R ===
- Raven
- The Really Wild Show
- Recess
- The Riddlers
- Ripley and Scuff
- Roary the Racing Car
- Rocket Boy and Toro
- Rotten Ralph
- Romuald the Reindeer
- Round the Twist
- Rugrats

=== S ===
- Salty's Lighthouse
- The Secret Show
- Sergeant Stripes
- Shaun the Sheep
- Sheeep
- The Singing Kettle
- Sir Gadabout: The Worst Knight in the Land
- SMart
- Sooty Heights
- Sooty & Co.
- SpongeBob SquarePants
- Starhill Ponies
- The Story of Tracy Beaker
- Strange Dawn
- Student Bodies

=== T ===
- Tales of the Tooth Fairies
- Taz-Mania
- Teddybears
- Teletubbies
- There's a Viking in My Bed
- Thomas and Friends
- Thunderbirds
- Timbuctoo
- Tiny Planets
- Tots TV
- The Treacle People
- Tweenies

=== U ===
- Uncle Dad

=== W ===
- Watch My Chops
- Watership Down
- Waybuloo
- What's New Scooby-Doo?
- Whizziwig
- Wide-Eye
- Wiggly Park
- The Wild Thornberrys
- William's Wish Wellingtons
- The Wizards of Waverly Place
- The Wombles
- The Worst Witch

=== Y ===
- Yoho Ahoy
- Yoko! Jakamoko! Toto!

=== Z ===
- Zot the Dog
- ZZZap!
