= Zzap! =

Zzap! may refer to:

- Zzap!64, a British computer game magazine
- ZZZap!, a British children's television comedy programme
