= Alan Protheroe =

British journalist (1934–2013)

Alan Protheroe CBE (10 January 1934 – 6 April 2013) was a BBC executive who served as assistant Director-General in the 1980s. In 1987, he went on to run the Services Sound and Vision Corporation, now BFBS, providing radio and television services to the British Armed Forces.

The son of a non-conformist minister, he was born in St. David's, Pembrokeshire. Educated at Maesteg Grammar School, he left school at 16 to join the Glamorgan Gazette as a trainee reporter. He joined BBC Wales in 1957, becoming editor of News and Current Affairs in Wales, later moving to London where, in 1977, he became editor of BBC TV News.

During his tenure overseeing BBC News, Protheroe is credited with fighting for "old-fashioned hard news values", including promoting well respected journalists (such as John Humphries) into newsreader positions for the first time at the BBC. Protheroe continued to serve in the Territorial Army throughout his time at the BBC and was promoted to full colonel in 1984. In 1980 he was awarded a military MBE and appointed CBE (military) in 1991.
