= ZZZap! =

British children's television show

- Genre: Children's; Slapstick; Comedy; Arts & Crafts
- Directed by: Paul Slater (1994); Ian Bolt (1997–1998); Alistair Clark (1993); Adrian Hedley (1995–1997); Bob Wild (1997–1998); Simon Pearce (1999–2001)
- Starring: Neil Buchanan; Sophie Aldred; Richard Waites; Sarah Pickthall; Deborah McCallum; Claire Macaulay
- Voices of: Neil Buchanan; Sophie Aldred; Richard Waites
- Theme music composer: Ron Aspery
- Opening theme: Keystone Chaos
- Country of origin: United Kingdom
- Original languages: English text only, aimed at the hard of hearing
- No. of series: 10
- No. of episodes: 140 + Cuthbert's Diary (list of episodes)

Production
- Executive producers: Dan Maddicott; Richard Morse; Janie Grace
- Producers: Neil Buchanan; Tim Edmunds; Driana Jones; Laura Hayes (asst)
- Editors: Jim Lownie; Chris Jackson; Simon Cruse
- Running time: 15 minutes
- Production companies: The Media Merchants; Meridian Broadcasting

Original release
- Network: ITV (CITV)
- Release: 8 January 1993 – 21 September 2001

Zzzap (rendered ZZZap!) was a British children's television comedy programme, produced by The Media Merchants and Meridian Broadcasting, and broadcast on CITV from 8 January 1993 until 21 September 2001, for ten series. The series focused on a series of shorts involving a variety of characters from a comic book that is brought to life, with stories mainly involving visual humour in order to cater to deaf children.

== Format ==
Zzzap focuses on a series of short comic-book style stories featuring a variety of characters, who star within the titular comic book, dubbed as "The Television Comic", which is brought to life by its readers via a magic television remote. Each episode would consist of four shorts, designed mainly for comedy, often presented with some incorporation elements of comic book elements - such as comic panel borders and information boxes. On occasion, the show would sometimes have episodes that would include a quiz-styled short, involving young viewers guessing what an object was before they are revealed in full.

Throughout the series run, the shorts featured the following characters:

- Cuthbert Lilly - A dim-witted, clumsy man, who would attempt to do something, but always through a combination of bad luck and mistakes find them going wrong.
- Tricky Dicky - A masked spy, who would challenge a group of children to successfully complete a mission of his; the character only featured in the first series.
- Smarty Arty - An artist who uses his artistic skills for fun. In the first series, the character would create large-scale artwork with objects - similar in format to CITV's Art Attack - but from the second series afterwards, the focus was on comedic plots where the character would have adventures through drawing objects he would use.
- Minnie Magic - A magician who tries to use magic for fun adventures, but who often finds it backfiring in amusing ways whatever the task she is using it for; she replaced Smarty Arty after the seventh series.
- The Handymen - A pair of gloved hands who perform tricks and make food and artwork for an audience of living hands. The short was often aimed as a step-by-step guide to teach children how to do tricks or craft something.
- Daisy Dare - A female trickster, who would challenge a group of children to complete a simple task that is made more challenging; the character replaced Tricky Dicky from the second series onwards.

The show was primarily designed with deaf children in mind, and thus focused on silent-styled comedy, with some sounds given textual overlays in a similar manner to comic book stories; the audience featured in The Handymen segments also used sign clapping instead of actuall clapping per the show's design. Regular music featured, often relying on pieces from classic Hollywood entertainment, and characters were given their own sounds for regular young audiences.

== Episodes ==
Series	Episodes	Originally released	
Series	Episodes	First released	Last released
1	10	8 January 1993	12 March 1993
2	10	7 January 1994	11 March 1994
3	10	6 January 1995	10 March 1995
4	10	5 January 1996	8 March 1996
5	13	10 January 1997	11 April 1997
6	13	9 January 1998	3 April 1998
7	16	1 September 1998	15 December 1998
8	13	7 September 1999	30 November 1999
9	13	7 September 2000	30 November 2000
10	15	3 September 2001	21 September 2001

== Production ==
Episodes were designed to fit at least a fifteen minute broadcast slot, with each short written to cover roughly a quarter of that time. Between the first and ninth series, the show relied on a transition sequence in which the camera zoomed in a panel on the comic corresponding to the short about to be shown. The production of these sequences was done with the camera starting at each panel that would be used, and then pulling back to a wide shot, before the camerawork was reversed in post-production - this technique was done to aid the camera operator in aligning the camera squarely with the panel.

In the first series, the show's opening titles focused on a young boy buying the comic and using it's TV remote to bring it to life, with the closing titles later seeing him shrink it down and leaving with it. The scenes were shot at Chequers Shopping Centre in Maidstone; for the rest of the series, these scenes were dropped in favour of opening sequence feature sneak-peaks of the shorts to be shown. By the eighth series, some computer generated additions were included in episodes, before the final series introduced a CGI roulette of the panels to replace the comic-book transition scene.

=== Main ===
Character	Actor(s)	Series
Cuthbert Lilly	Richard Waites	All
Tricky Dicky	Richard Waites	1
Daisy Dare	Deborah McCallum	2–8
Daisy Dare	Claire Macaulay	9–10
The Handymen	Sarah Pickthall	All
Smart Arty	Neil Buchanan	1–7
Minnie Magic	Sophie Aldred	8–10

== Syndication ==
The series was more recently broadcast on the CITV channel in 2006, 2007 and 2009. There were plans to broadcast the programme as part of CITV's 30th anniversary in January 2013, but this did not go ahead due to licensing issues.

The Smart Arty elements and The Handymen were repeated in the US and Canada as part of It's Itsy Bitsy Time on Fox Family and Treehouse TV, respectively, with Smart Arty being renamed to "Art to Art with Arty Art". The segments ran from 1999 until 2001.

ZZZap! was also screened on TVOntario in Canada in its original format, alongside the runs on It's Itsy Bitsy Time.

The series was also broadcast on the local military forces television networks BFBS and SSVC Television as part of their children's programming blocks Children's SSVC and Room 785. The network was shown on television transmissions in Germany, Belize, Cyprus, Bosnia and Herzegovina, the Falkland Islands and Gibraltar.

== Media releases ==
- ZZZap! The Bumper Video Comic (VHS)
- ZZZap! Vol. 2 – Holiday Special (VHS)
- ZZZap! Vol. 3 – Goes Bonkers (VHS)
- ZZZap! Vol. 4 – Goes Completely Crazy (VHS)
- The Wildest Ever ZZZap! Video (VHS)

== Music ==
The show uses library music to score sketches, and any filler panels. The theme tune is Keystone Chaos, composed by Ron Aspery, from the KPM library. The background music used in the majority of The Handymen sketches is Memories of the Music Hall, composed by Roger Webb, from the De Wolfe Music Library.

Track(s) used from the Music House Library (KPM Music) for Cuthbert Lilly sketches:

- Candid Camera (MHE 3): "Vintage Hollywood" by Alan Hawkshaw
- Children's Hour (KPM 147): "Animal Capers" by Tony Kinsey
- Comedy & Animation Volume I (KPM 367): "Busy Days"
- Comedy Classics (MHS 13): "English Country Garden", "He'd Have To Get Under"
- Comedy Classics 1 by Ron Aspery (KPM 131): "Banana Skin", "Bundle Of Fun", "Goodbye Rodney", "Jobsworth", "Morning Darling!", "Roll Up! Roll Up!", "Round the Bend", "Tea Dance", "What A Cheek!", "Runaround"
- Comedy Situations (MHE 31): "Clowns", "Comedy Rag", "Toytown"
- Tiny Tots (MHS 19): "Pony Trotting"
- Whimsy (KPM 87): "Happy Rag (a)"

Track(s) used from the Parry Music Library (BMG Production Music) for Cuthbert Lilly sketches:

- The Comedy Collection (PML 016): "Follies"

Track(s) used from The London Theatre Orchestra for Cuthbert Lilly sketches:

- Great Sports Themes (EMPRCD 715): "Match Of The Day (Offside)"

Track(s) used from the Carlin Library CD's (Warner Chappell Production Music) for Cuthbert Lilly sketches:

- Wurlitzer and Mechanical Organs (CAR 106): "King Cotton "
- Acoustic/Woodbind/Brass (CAR 162): "The Jolly Parade"
- Children/Comedy/Shorts (CAR 156): "Happy Oompah"
- Children/Comedy/Shorts 2 (CAR 176): "Toy Car"
- Comedy/Cartoon/Children (CAR 136): "Circus Clowns", "Coach Trip", "Fred Scuttle", "Jugglers", "Sax Of Fun", "Shark Alert"
- Comedy/TV/Entertainment (CAR 257): "Circus Rag"
- Fun/Novelty/Kids (CAR 237): "Captain Country", "Stop That Sax"
- Light-Hearted & Fun (CAR 144): "Ben Hill Billy", "String Holiday"
- Solo Piano - Popular Styles (CAR 143): "Green Tulips"
- The History of Jazz (Small Groups) (CAR 148): "Julliette"

Track(s) used from Sonoton Music (APM Music) for Cuthbert Lilly sketches:

- Comic Collection 4: Period Slapstick (SCD 165): "Dapper Flapper", "Rag 'n Bone", "Rattle Them Bones", "Scotch On The Rocks", "Supper At The Savoy"

Track(s) used from the De Wolfe Library for Cuthbert Lilly sketches:

- Loony Tunes (DWCD 0254): "Jangle Man", "The Clowns Are In Town"

Track(s) used from FirstCom Music (Universal Production Music) for Cuthbert Lilly sketches:

- Funny Situations (FC S72): "Make It Stop Ok?"

Track(s) used from BMG Production Music on RCA Label for Cuthbert Lilly sketches:

- Silent Movie Era (RCAL 1021): "Whistle Stop" by Giovanni Tommaso

Track(s) used for Tricky Dicky sketches:

- Archive - Famous Themes Revisited 1 (CHAP 185): "Devil's Galop" by Charles Williams
- Cartoon/Comedy/Children (CAR 150): "Friendly Panther"

Track(s) used for The Handymen sketches:

- Come Dancing by Sam Fonteyn (KPM 1151): "Love In June", "The Mirabelle Waltz", "The Silver Ballroom"
- Fun/Novelty/Kids (CAR 237): "Seaside Piano"
- Memories Of The Music Hall by Roger Webb (DWCD 0082): "After The Ball", "Daisy Bell", "I'll Be Your Sweetheart", "Lily Of Laguna", "Memories Of The Music Hall", "Old Time Waltz", "Schoft-schoe Schottische", "The Honeysuckle And The Bee", "Why Am I Always The Bridesmaid?"
- Period Pieces/Hotel Ballroom (BMLP 111): "Quick Waltz"
- Victoriana (Parts 1 and 2) (KPMLP 1116): "Tea Dance"
- Victorian/Edwardian (CHAP 149): "Debutants Ball", "Lady Windermere"

Track(s) used for Smart Arty sketches:

- Classical String Quartet (CHAP 141): "Boccherini-Minuet No. 5 In E Major" by Luigi Boccherini

Track(s) used for Daisy Dares You sketches:

- Loony Tunes (BR28 BRF10): "Pocket Full Of Peanuts" & "Keyboard Wizzard" (both by Duncan Lamont)

Track(s) used for Minnie The Mini Magician sketches:

- Comedy and Animation Volume 1 (KPM 367): "Jolly Good"
- Comedy Classics 1 by Ron Aspery (KPM 131): "Exit Stage Left", "Half O'Shanty"
- Comedy/TV/Entertainment (CAR 257): "Sitcom Tune"
- Fun/Novelty/Kids (CAR 237): "Custard Pie"
- Lite Whimsy (SCD 397): "Biscuit's Bounce";
- Loony Tunes (DWCD 0254): "Jumping Around", "Pizzicato Bliss"
- Melody All The Way (JW 480): "Big Bad Ballad_30"
- Sunny Jim (DWLP 3437): "Dimple"
- TOPSY TURVY (DWCD 0016): "Hello Cheeky", "Snakes and Ladders", "Tea Break", "Topsy Turvy" by Jack Trombey

Track(s) commonly used for Filler Panels (Question Mark/Dot-to-Dot/Eye Segments, etc):

- Comedy Situations (MHE 31): "Pink Python" by Mo Foster
- Comedy Situations 2 (KPM 132): "Drag"
- Off The Wall (KPM 146): "Cluedo"

Track(s) used for the Zzzap Summer Specials and Christmas Annual sketches:

- Children/Well Known Tunes 2 (CAR 208): "Sailor's Hornpipe"
- Christmas, Kids & Comedy (ATMOS15 3): "Christmas Celebration", "Xmas Cracker"
- Comedy Classics (MHS 13): "I Do Like To Be Beside The Seaside (1)", "Jingle Bells"
- Comic Cuts (BR 0026): "Jolly Jack Tar", "PC Plonker"
- Happy-Go-Lucky (FC S29): "Take Me Out"
- The Spirit Of Christmas (KPM 1213): "We Wish You A Merry Christmas (B)"
- The World of Christmas (CAR 229): "Jingle Bells"
