= List of ZZZap! episodes =

This is a list of episodes for the children's television programme ZZZap! Aimed for hearing-impaired children, the show produced ten series that aired on ITV between 8 January 1993 and 21 September 2001.

== Series overview ==
| Series | Episodes | Originally released | |
| Series | Episodes | First released | Last released |
|---|---|---|---|
| 1 | 10 | 8 January 1993 | 12 March 1993 |
| 2 | 10 | 7 January 1994 | 11 March 1994 |
| 3 | 10 | 6 January 1995 | 10 March 1995 |
| 4 | 10 | 5 January 1996 | 8 March 1996 |
| 5 | 13 | 10 January 1997 | 11 April 1997 |
| 6 | 13 | 9 January 1998 | 3 April 1998 |
| 7 | 16 | 1 September 1998 | 15 December 1998 |
| 8 | 13 | 7 September 1999 | 30 November 1999 |
| 9 | 13 | 7 September 2000 | 30 November 2000 |
| 10 | 15 | 3 September 2001 | 21 September 2001 |

== Episodes ==
=== Series 1 (1993) ===
Series 1 introduced all the main characters – Cuthbert Lilly, Smart Arty, The Handymen and Tricky Dicky.

| No. overall | No. in series | Title | Original release date |
|---|---|---|---|
| 1 | 1 | "Episode 1.1" | 8 January 1993 |
Cuthbert Lilly: Cuthbert takes his dog for a walk. Smart Arty: Smart Arty creates a giant picture of Laurel and Hardy out of black tape. The Handymen: Lift a Bottle. Tricky Dicky's Mission Impossible: To pop 1,000 balloons. KIDS WIN
| 2 | 2 | "Episode 1.2" | 15 January 1993 |
Cuthbert Lilly: Cuthbert causes mayhem on a trip to the local park. Smart Arty: Smart Arty creates a giant picture of the Statue of Liberty in a hardware store. The Handymen: Float an Egg. Tricky Dicky's Mission Impossible: To walk on stilts. KIDS WIN
| 3 | 3 | "Episode 1.3" | 22 January 1993 |
Cuthbert Lilly: Cuthbert visits a toy shop to play with the toys. Smart Arty: Smart Arty creates a giant picture of a golfer on a golf course. The Handymen: Hand Stands. Tricky Dicky's Mission Impossible: To eat a jelly. TRICKY WINS
| 4 | 4 | "Episode 1.4" | 29 January 1993 |
Cuthbert Lilly: Cuthbert goes on a camping holiday. Smart Arty: Smart Arty creates a giant picture of an owl using only leaves. The Handymen: Finger Painting. Tricky Dicky's Mission Impossible: To drink a milkshake. TRICKY WINS
| 5 | 5 | "Episode 1.5" | 5 February 1993 |
Cuthbert Lilly: Cuthbert visits his friend in hospital. Smart Arty: Smart Arty creates a giant picture of the Eiffel Tower using nothing but kitchen knives. The Handymen: Handy Art. Tricky Dicky's Mission Impossible: To spell 'impossible'. TRICKY WINS
| 6 | 6 | "Episode 1.6" | 12 February 1993 |
Cuthbert Lilly: Cuthbert has a picnic in the park. Smart Arty: Smart Arty makes a giant picture of a tennis racket on a tennis court. The Handymen: Hand Sandwich. Tricky Dicky's Mission Impossible: To pour custard on a pudding. KIDS WIN
| 7 | 7 | "Episode 1.7" | 19 February 1993 |
Cuthbert Lilly: Cuthbert plays football. Smart Arty: Smart Arty makes a giant picture of a monkey out of biscuits. The Handymen: Jump Through a Postcard. Tricky Dicky's Mission Impossible: To stand on water. KIDS WIN
| 8 | 8 | "Episode 1.8" | 26 February 1993 |
Cuthbert Lilly: Cuthbert goes fishing. Smart Arty: Smart Arty makes a big picture of Punch and Judy out of sweets. The Handymen: Handmade Cards. Tricky Dicky's Mission Impossible: To get A and B across a pole. TRICKY WINS
| 9 | 9 | "Episode 1.9" | 5 March 1993 |
Cuthbert Lilly: Cuthbert is an office cleaner. Smart Arty: Smart Arty makes a giant picture of a chicken out of farm vegetables. The Handymen: Join Two Paper Clips. Tricky Dicky's Mission Impossible: To remove six tins. KIDS WIN
| 10 | 10 | "Episode 1.10" | 12 March 1993 |
Cuthbert Lilly: Cuthbert goes to an amusement park. Smart Arty: Smart Arty makes a giant picture of a goblin on a toadstool. The Handymen: Wobbly Fruit. Tricky Dicky's Mission Impossible: To trick Tricky Dicky. TRICKY WINS

=== Series 2 (1994) ===
Series 2 saw the departure of Tricky Dicky and the inclusion of a new character – Daisy Dares, played by Deborah McCallum. The episodes were produced in 1993.

| No. overall | No. in series | Title | Original release date |
|---|---|---|---|
| 11 | 1 | "Episode 2.1" | 7 January 1994 |
Cuthbert Lilly: Cuthbert looks for a place to keep his prize goldfish. Smart Arty: Smart Arty plays a crazy round of golf. The Handymen: Waving Cards. Question Mark: Basket/Farm Tractor. Daisy Dares You: Daisy dares you to enter her limbo contest. DAISY WINS
| 12 | 2 | "Episode 2.2" | 14 January 1994 |
Cuthbert Lilly: Cuthbert struggles to sleep because of a bad case of the hiccups! Smart Arty: Smart Arty attempts to hang his picture up on the wall. The Handymen: Mad Faces. Question Mark: Dartboard/Tree In Blossom. Daisy Dares You: Daisy dares you to cross a bridge. KIDS WIN
| 13 | 3 | "Episode 2.3" | 21 January 1994 |
Cuthbert Lilly: Cuthbert has soiled a zebra crossing with his ice lolly and needs to clean it up! Smart Arty: Smart Arty has trouble trying to get rid of a pesky mouse. The Handymen: Turn 2p Into 10p. Daisy Dares You: Daisy dares you to carry a pile of building blocks. KIDS WIN
| 14 | 4 | "Episode 2.4" | 28 January 1994 |
Cuthbert Lilly: Cuthbert desperately tries to smooth his hair down. Smart Arty: Smart Arty goes to bed. The Handymen: Hand Garland. Question Mark: Loo Roll/Roses. Daisy Dares You: Daisy dares you to make your way through a climbing apparatus. DAISY WINS
| 15 | 5 | "Episode 2.5" | 4 February 1994 |
Cuthbert Lilly: Cuthbert learns how to dance in an attempt to win the heart of the woman of his dreams at the Valentine's dance. Smart Arty: Smart Arty has been invited by Daisy to attend her fancy dress party. The Handymen: Jelly Segments. Daisy Dares You: Daisy dares you to eat marshmallows. DAISY WINS
| 16 | 6 | "Episode 2.6" | 11 February 1994 |
Cuthbert Lilly: Cuthbert has set up a car cleaning service. Smart Arty: Smart Arty grows a flower. The Handymen: Magic Balloon. Question Mark: Keys/Guards/Duck. Daisy Dares You: Daisy dares you to grab a box of chocolates from her. KIDS WIN
| 17 | 7 | "Episode 2.7" | 18 February 1994 |
Cuthbert Lilly: Cuthbert waters his flowers. Smart Arty: Smart Arty wants to go for a drive in his car. The Handymen: Cool Handshake. Question Mark: Apple/Helicopter/Elephant. Daisy Dares You: Daisy dares you to take on an obstacle course like no other! KIDS WIN
| 18 | 8 | "Episode 2.8" | 25 February 1994 |
Cuthbert Lilly: Cuthbert cooks up a calamity in the kitchen! Smart Arty: Smart Arty does a spot of fishing. The Handymen: Turn The Elephant Around. Daisy Dares You: Daisy dares you to paint a picture.
| 19 | 9 | "Episode 2.9" | 4 March 1994 |
Cuthbert Lilly: Cuthbert's shoelaces break at the hardware store. Smart Arty: Smart Arty accidentally spills paint on the floor. The Handymen: Burst Through Frames. Daisy Dares You: Daisy dares you to build a tower of cards. KIDS WIN
| 20 | 10 | "Episode 2.10" | 11 March 1994 |
Cuthbert Lilly: Cuthbert wants to stick a picture to his wall. Smart Arty: Smart Arty goes sunbathing. The Handymen: Make a Picture Laugh. Daisy Dares You: Daisy dares you to come to her tea party. DAISY WINS

=== Series 3 (1995) ===
| No. overall | No. in series | Title | Original release date |
|---|---|---|---|
| 21 | 1 | "Episode 3.1" | 6 January 1995 |
Cuthbert Lilly: Cuthbert attempts to fix his garden fence. Smart Arty: Smart Arty has problems with his TV. The Handymen: Banana Lollies. Question Mark: Traction Engine. Daisy Dares You: Daisy dares you to take on her inflatable ring course. KIDS WIN
| 22 | 2 | "Episode 3.2" | 13 January 1995 |
Cuthbert Lilly: Cuthbert gets more than he bargained for at the gym. Smart Arty: Smart Arty draws some balloons. The Handymen: Vanishing Coin. Question Mark: Melon. Daisy Dares You: Daisy dares you to eat an ice cream... On a stick! DAISY WINS
| 23 | 3 | "Episode 3.3" | 20 January 1995 |
Cuthbert Lilly: Cuthbert tries to relax in a hammock. Smart Arty: Smart Arty tries to get paint off his hands. The Handymen: Prisoners. Question Mark: Flowers. Daisy Dares You: Daisy dares you to play a game of football. DAISY WINS
| 24 | 4 | "Episode 3.4" | 27 January 1995 |
Cuthbert Lilly: Cuthbert needs to brush his teeth before bed. Smart Arty: Smart Arty draws a boat. The Handymen: Stamp Frame. Question Mark: Orange/Cow/Train. Daisy Dares You: Daisy dares you to move a trolley around an obstacle course. KIDS WIN
| 25 | 5 | "Episode 3.5" | 3 February 1995 |
Cuthbert Lilly: Cuthbert cleans his living room. Smart Arty: Smart Arty attempts to fix his easel. The Handymen: Balloon Cards. Question Mark: Coconut/Police Car. Daisy Dares You: Daisy dares you to catch school dinners with your head. DAISY WINS
| 26 | 6 | "Episode 3.6" | 10 February 1995 |
Cuthbert Lilly: Cuthbert goes to an Italian restaurant. Smart Arty: Smart Arty goes swimming. The Handymen: Pop Up Cards. Question Mark: Toy Rabbit/Hovercraft. Daisy Dares You: Daisy dares you to hold a tea party back to finish. KIDS WIN
| 27 | 7 | "Episode 3.7" | 17 February 1995 |
Cuthbert Lilly: Cuthbert tries to stop a rabbit from eating his prize carrots. Smart Arty: Smart Arty draws a lift. The Handymen: Cress Hands. Question Mark: Slinky/Sheep/Bus. Daisy Dares You: Daisy dares you to walk along a bridge and get into a boat. KIDS WIN
| 28 | 8 | "Episode 3.8" | 24 February 1995 |
Cuthbert Lilly: Cuthbert gets his toe stuck in a bath tap. Smart Arty: Smart Arty plays tennis. The Handymen: Flying Chicken. Daisy Dares You: Daisy dares you to eat some sausage and mash. DAISY WINS
| 29 | 9 | "Episode 3.9" | 3 March 1995 |
Cuthbert Lilly: Cuthbert keeps cool on a hot day with some ice cream. Smart Arty: Smart Arty draws himself an aeroplane. The Handymen: Magic Cups. Question Mark: Cake. Daisy Dares You: Daisy dares you to her sack race contest. DAISY WINS
| 30 | 10 | "Episode 3.10" | 10 March 1995 |
Cuthbert Lilly: Cuthbert attempts to take his picture. Smart Arty: Smart Arty eats too much food. The Handymen: Disappearing Scarf. Question Mark: Cheese Grater. Daisy Dares You: Daisy dares you to balance cups and plates. DAISY WINS

=== Series 4 (1996) ===
The episodes were produced in 1995.

| No. overall | No. in series | Title | Original release date |
|---|---|---|---|
| 31 | 1 | "Episode 4.1" | 5 January 1996 |
Cuthbert Lilly: Cuthbert rides in his car. Smart Arty: Smart Arty does a magic show. The Handymen: Balancing Egg. Question Mark: Telephone Box/Cheese/Ice Cream Van. Daisy Dares You: Daisy dares you to catch a balloon through a rugby post. KIDS WIN
| 32 | 2 | "Episode 4.2" | 12 January 1996 |
Cuthbert Lilly: Cuthbert heads to the beach. Smart Arty: Smart Arty plays with a bow and arrow. The Handymen: Handy Wrapping Paper. Question Mark: Nail Brush/Bridge. Daisy Dares You: Daisy dares you to her space hopper contest. KIDS WIN
| 33 | 3 | "Episode 4.3" | 19 January 1996 |
Cuthbert Lilly: Cuthbert goes to a local launderette. Smart Arty: Smart Arty does his gymnastic skills. The Handymen: Magic Bottle. Question Mark: Shell/Taxi. Daisy Dares You: Daisy dares you to her painting dare with Smart Arty. DAISY WINS
| 34 | 4 | "Episode 4.4" | 26 January 1996 |
Cuthbert Lilly: Cuthbert goes horse riding. Smart Arty: Smart Arty goes on a treasure hunt. The Handymen: Seaside Jellies. Daisy Dares You: Daisy dares you to her hopscotch swimming pool. DAISY WINS
| 35 | 5 | "Episode 4.5" | 2 February 1996 |
Cuthbert Lilly: Cuthbert goes to ballet class. Smart Arty: Smart Arty attempts to keep his egg safe. The Handymen: Handy Puppets. Question Mark: Cat/Shuttlecock/Boat. Daisy Dares You: Daisy dares you to get across the mat without touching the nasty surprises. DAISY WINS
| 36 | 6 | "Episode 4.6" | 9 February 1996 |
Cuthbert Lilly: Cuthbert struggles to nail a picture to his wall. Smart Arty: Smart Arty attempts to take a shower. The Handymen: Banana Dream. Question Mark: Table Tennis Bat. Daisy Dares You: Daisy dares you to a spot of fishing for baked beans. DAISY WINS
| 37 | 7 | "Episode 4.7" | 16 February 1996 |
Cuthbert Lilly: Cuthbert searches for money for the ice cream van. Smart Arty: Smart Arty goes underwater. The Handymen: Sporty Sandwiches. Question Mark: Pine Cone/Fire Engine. Daisy Dares You: Daisy dares you to roll across a barrel and the rope. DAISY WINS
| 38 | 8 | "Episode 4.8" | 23 February 1996 |
Cuthbert Lilly: Cuthbert tries skateboarding. Smart Arty: Smart Arty tries out some new shoes. The Handymen: Wobbling Card. Daisy Dares You: Daisy dares you to cross islands on her Island Tours. KIDS WIN
| 39 | 9 | "Episode 4.9" | 1 March 1996 |
Cuthbert Lilly: Cuthbert causes mayhem in a pottery shop. Smart Arty: Smart Arty goes ice skating. The Handymen: Funny Face. Daisy Dares You: Daisy dares you to her waiters and waitresses game. KIDS WIN
| 40 | 10 | "Episode 4.10" | 8 March 1996 |
Cuthbert Lilly: Cuthbert attempts to wash the dishes. Smart Arty: Smart Arty tries to keep cool on a hot day. The Handymen: Ice Cream Horror Face. Question Mark: Ghetto Blaster/Horse. Daisy Dares You: Daisy dares you to throw all kinds of food through a basketball hoop.

=== Christmas Annuals (1996) ===
| No. overall | No. in series | Title | Original release date |
|---|---|---|---|
| 41 | 1 | "Zzzap! Christmas Annual" | 29 November 1996 |
The festivities have begun and the comic-strip characters are making a start on decorating the house. Cuthbert Lilly has some trouble with a pesky rabbit in his carrot patch, and The Handymen have some unique ideas for making greetings cards.
| 42 | 2 | "Zzzap! Christmas Annual" | 6 December 1996 |
There is chaos with the comic-strip characters as they attempt to put up their Christmas tree! Smart Arty puts on a magic show, and Daisy is looking for some waiters and waitresses in her latest dare.
| 43 | 3 | "Zzzap! Christmas Annual" | 13 December 1996 |
More Christmas antics with Cuthbert Lily, Smart Arty, Daisy and the Handymen as they have a Christmas party! The Handymen make a handy wrapping paper, and Daisy dares you to take an obstacle course. Plus there is a puzzle page of a Yule Log and Crackers from the Question Mark.
| 44 | 4 | "Zzzap! Christmas Annual" | 20 December 1996 |
The comic-strip characters celebrate the arrival of Christmas Day and exchange gifts. Cuthbert Lilly does a spot of spring cleaning, with the help of a troublesome vacuum cleaner! Plus there is a selection box of best bits from across the series.

=== Series 5 (1997) ===
The episodes were produced in 1996.

| No. overall | No. in series | Title | Original release date |
|---|---|---|---|
| 45 | 1 | "Episode 5.1" | 10 January 1997 |
Cuthbert Lilly: Cuthbert helps clean a man's window. Smart Arty: Smart Arty goes skiing in the snow. The Handymen: Fruity Chocolate Kebabs. Question Mark: Wellington Boots/Microphone/Cactus. Daisy Dares You: Daisy dares you to her skittles game. DAISY WINS
| 46 | 2 | "Episode 5.2" | 17 January 1997 |
Cuthbert Lilly: Cuthbert plays a game of golf. Smart Arty: Smart Arty has trouble trying to make a baby stop crying. The Handymen: Self Raising Roll. Question Mark: Gnome/Finger Print/Slide. Daisy Dares You: Daisy dares you to slide across the pole. KIDS WIN
| 47 | 3 | "Episode 5.3" | 24 January 1997 |
Cuthbert Lilly: Cuthbert goes to a swimming pool. Smart Arty: Smart Arty builds a space rocket. The Handymen: Handy Window. Question Mark: Swan/Conkers/Toaster. Daisy Dares You: Daisy dares you to come to her summer cafe. DAISY WINS
| 48 | 4 | "Episode 5.4" | 31 January 1997 |
Cuthbert Lilly: Cuthbert shows off his hairdressing skills. Smart Arty: Smart Arty plays football. The Handymen: The Balancing Glass. Question Mark: Typewriter/Doll. Daisy Dares You: Daisy dares you to her hula hoop swimming pool dare. KIDS WIN
| 49 | 5 | "Episode 5.5" | 7 February 1997 |
Cuthbert Lilly: Cuthbert plays tennis. Smart Arty: Smart Arty becomes a clown and joins the circus. The Handymen: Windy Hand. Question Mark: Cooked Breakfast/Pan Scourer/Iron/Jelly Beans. Daisy Dares You: Daisy dares you to play a sport of pong jump. KIDS WIN
| 50 | 6 | "Episode 5.6" | 14 February 1997 |
Cuthbert Lilly: Cuthbert cuts the grass. Smart Arty: Smart Arty rides in a canoe. The Handymen: Mash Potato Hedgehog. Question Mark: Dustbin/Biscuits. Daisy Dares You: Daisy dares you to collect clothes from the clothesline. DAISY WINS
| 52 | 7 | "Episode 5.7" | 28 February 1997 |
Cuthbert Lilly: Cuthbert goes to the karate class. Smart Arty: Smart Arty is washing his smock. The Handymen: Monkey Chain. Question Mark: Rubber Duck. Daisy Dares You: Daisy dares you to put an egg into the egg cup. KIDS WIN
| 53 | 8 | "Episode 5.8" | 7 March 1997 |
Cuthbert Lilly: Cuthbert does some clothes modelling in a department store. Smart Arty: Smart Arty becomes a jockey and rides a horse. The Handymen: Strawberry Sunset. Question Mark: Pizza/Trainer/Frog. Daisy Dares You: Daisy dares you to wash her go-kart. DAISY WINS
| 54 | 9 | "Episode 5.9" | 14 March 1997 |
Cuthbert Lilly: Cuthbert receives an invite for a fancy dress party. Smart Arty: Smart Arty has some coconut troubles. The Handymen: Floating Pencil. Question Mark: Vacuum Cleaner/Teddy. Daisy Dares You: Daisy dares you to serve her food. DAISY WINS
| 55 | 10 | "Episode 5.10" | 21 March 1997 |
Cuthbert Lilly: Cuthbert goes bowling. Smart Arty: Smart Arty has a few bee problems. The Handymen: Handy Letter Rack. Question Mark: Tortoise. Daisy Dares You: Daisy dares you to try lie in her hammock. DAISY WINS
| 56 | 11 | "Episode 5.11" | 28 March 1997 |
Cuthbert Lilly: Cuthbert goes for a bike ride. Smart Arty: Smart Arty goes to the funfair. The Handymen: Surprise Hand Card. Question Mark: Bowl of Fruit/Walnuts. Daisy Dares You: Daisy dares you to find the bag of gold. KIDS WIN
| 57 | 12 | "Episode 5.12" | 4 April 1997 |
Cuthbert Lilly: Cuthbert has trouble sleeping due to a light that keeps flashing on and off and some bed springs because of his broken bed he sleeps in a department store and a crowd of people are looking at him. Smart Arty: Smart Arty goes camping. The Handymen: Banana Racing Car. Question Mark: Suitcase/Sandwich/Golf Clubs. Daisy Dares You: Daisy dares you to herd cattle. KIDS WIN
| 58 | 13 | "Episode 5.13" | 11 April 1997 |
Cuthbert Lilly: Cuthbert has a few issues with his kite. Smart Arty: Smart Arty gets an injury. The Handymen: Two Tone Lolly. Question Mark: Bench. Daisy Dares You: Daisy dares you to knock helmets off the fence.

=== Cuthbert's Diary (1997) ===
| No. overall | No. in series | Title | Original release date |
|---|---|---|---|
| 51 | 1 | "Cuthbert's Diary" | 18 February 1997 |
Monday: Cuthbert takes his dog for a walk. (from Episode 1.1); Tuesday: Cuthbert wraps his Mum's birthday present. Wednesday: Cuthbert learns how to dance in an attempt to win the heart of the woman of his dreams at the Valentine's dance. (from Episode 2.5); Thursday: Cuthbert gives his Mum a birthday cake. Friday: Cuthbert tries skateboarding. (from Episode 4.8); Saturday: Cuthbert plays with his yo-yo in his bedroom. Sunday: Cuthbert visits his friend in hospital. (from Episode 1.5)

=== Summer Specials (1997) ===
| No. overall | No. in series | Title | Original release date |
|---|---|---|---|
| 59 | 1 | "Zzzap! Summer Special" | 25 July 1997 |
The comic-strip gang are having a bonkers beach outing. Smart Arty draws some balloons, and The Handymen show you how to make a Cool Handshake.
| 60 | 2 | "Zzzap! Summer Special" | 1 August 1997 |
The fun and frolics continue down at the beach. Daisy Dares You to walk the plank, and Cuthbert Lilly pays a visit to the launderette.
| 61 | 3 | "Zzzap! Summer Special" | 8 August 1997 |
The comic-strip characters take to the sea...with guaranteed nautical nonsense! The Handymen show you how to float an egg, and Cuthbert Lilly goes for a crazy car journey.
| 62 | 4 | "Zzzap! Summer Special" | 15 August 1997 |
There's chaos on the camping site when the comic strip gang pitch up. Smart Arty draws a troublesome lift, and Daisy Dares You to catch a balloon...filled with gunge.
| 63 | 5 | "Zzzap! Summer Special" | 22 August 1997 |
The crazy camping expedition continues. Cuthbert Lilly is put through his paces at the gym, and The Handymen show you how to make a Funny Face.
| 64 | 6 | "Zzzap! Summer Special" | 29 August 1997 |
The comic strip gang find themselves in the jungle. Smart Arty goes sailing, and Daisy Dares You to eat an ice cream...on a stick.

=== Autumn Specials (1997) ===
| No. overall | No. in series | Title | Original release date |
|---|---|---|---|
| 65 | 1 | "ZZZap! Autumn Special" | 14 October 1997 |
Cuthbert Lily: Cuthbert goes hiking in the countryside. The Handymen: Magic Pencil. Daisy Dares You: Daisy dares you to pin the tail on the donkey. KIDS WIN
| 66 | 2 | "ZZZap! Autumn Special" | 21 October 1997 |
Cuthbert Lily: Cuthbert has a spot of bother at the doctors. Smart Arty: Smart Arty play a game of cricket. The Handymen: Chocolate and Banana Float.
| 67 | 3 | "ZZZap! Autumn Special" | 28 October 1997 |
Cuthbert Lily: Cuthbert goes to the athletics club. Smart Arty: Smart Arty play rescues a cat stuck up a tree. Daisy Dares You: Daisy dares you to balance on a ball in gunge. DAISY WINS
| 68 | 4 | "ZZZap! Autumn Special" | 4 November 1997 |
Cuthbert Lily: Cuthbert has trouble flying a boomerang. The Handymen: Lift a Marble. Daisy Dares You: Daisy dares you to enjoy her cream tea cakes. DAISY WINS
| 69 | 5 | "ZZZap! Autumn Special" | 11 November 1997 |
Cuthbert Lily: Cuthbert takes a trip to the boating lake. Smart Arty: Smart Arty makes breakfast. Daisy Dares You: Daisy dares you to eat cream cakes on a rope swing. DAISY WINS
| 70 | 6 | "ZZZap! Autumn Special" | 18 November 1997 |
Cuthbert Lily: Cuthbert visits the zoo. The Handymen: Magic Dry Tissue. Daisy Dares You: Daisy dares you to play a game of swimming pool golf. KIDS WIN
| 71 | 7 | "ZZZap! Autumn Special" | 25 November 1997 |
Cuthbert Lily: Cuthbert makes a new pair of trousers. The Handymen: Finger Frame Card. Daisy Dares You: Daisy dares you to do a swimming pool penalty shoot-out. KIDS WIN

=== Christmas Annual (1997) ===
| No. overall | No. in series | Title | Original release date |
|---|---|---|---|
| 72 | 1 | "Zzzap! Christmas Annual" | 16 December 1997 |
There is chaos in the kitchen with the comic-strip characters as they prepare their Christmas dinner! All does not go according to plan - however, a surprise visitor is on hand to save the day. The Handymen have some handy tips for making special garlands, and Daisy makes a splash at the swimming pool with a classic dare.

=== Series 6 (1998) ===
The episodes were produced in 1997.

| No. overall | No. in series | Title | Original release date |
|---|---|---|---|
| 73 | 1 | "Episode 6.1" | 9 January 1998 |
Cuthbert Lilly: Cuthbert goes to the funfair and spills candyfloss on a man's head. Smart Arty: Smart Arty plays a game of pool. The Handymen: Magnetic Picture. Question Mark: Windsurfer/Bird Cage/Donkey. Daisy Dares You: Daisy dares you to jump through the car tyres. DAISY WINS
| 74 | 2 | "Episode 6.2" | 16 January 1998 |
Cuthbert Lilly: Cuthbert gets a job as a milkman. Smart Arty: Smart Arty has run out of paint. The Handymen: Fizzy Ice Cube Lolly. Question Mark: Chessboard/Doormat; Daisy Dares You: Daisy dares you to flip the fish into your basket. DAISY WINS
| 75 | 3 | "Episode 6.3" | 23 January 1998 |
Cuthbert Lilly: Cuthbert goes to the supermarket. Smart Arty: Smart Arty attempts to cut the grass. The Handymen: Sunflower Hands. Question Mark: Rugby Ball/Trifle. Daisy Dares You: Daisy dares you to her basketball game contest. KIDS WIN
| 76 | 4 | "Episode 6.4" | 30 January 1998 |
Cuthbert Lilly: Cuthbert has trouble with his car. Smart Arty: Smart Arty participates in a sports day event. The Handymen: Turn Water Into Milk. Question Mark: Fish And Chips/Cricket Ball/Windmill. Daisy Dares You: Daisy dares you to pop a balloon with a pogo stick. DAISY WINS
| 77 | 5 | "Episode 6.5" | 6 February 1998 |
Cuthbert Lilly: Cuthbert visits a museum. Smart Arty: Smart Arty plays with some musical instruments. The Handymen: Handy Bookends. Daisy Dares You: Daisy dares you to transfer slop like a farm animal. KIDS WIN
| 78 | 6 | "Episode 6.6" | 13 February 1998 |
Cuthbert Lilly: Cuthbert becomes a fitness fanatic. Smart Arty: Smart Arty takes to the skies in his paper airplane. The Handymen: Apple Head. Question Mark: Spider/Brick/Greenhouse. Daisy Dares You: Daisy dares you to carry a tray of milkshakes. DAISY WINS
| 79 | 7 | "Episode 6.7" | 20 February 1998 |
Cuthbert Lilly: Cuthbert becomes a waiter and annoys a customer. Smart Arty: Smart Arty becomes a superhero. The Handymen: Magic Pencil Spinner. Question Mark: Carrot/Sandcastle. Daisy Dares You: Daisy dares you to her skipping in a swimming pool. KIDS WIN
| 80 | 8 | "Episode 6.8" | 27 February 1998 |
Cuthbert Lilly: Cuthbert does some odd jobs around the house. Smart Arty: Smart Arty finds himself in the desert in desperate need of water. The Handymen: Disappearing Coin. Question Mark: Kiwi Fruit/False Teeth/Thermometer. Daisy Dares You: Daisy dares you to make an ice cream. KIDS WIN
| 81 | 9 | "Episode 6.9" | 6 March 1998 |
Cuthbert Lilly: Cuthbert plays rugby. Smart Arty: Smart Arty takes to the skies in his hot air balloon. The Handymen: Potato Cress Head. Daisy Dares You: Daisy dares you to serve up a pizza. KIDS WIN
| 82 | 10 | "Episode 6.10" | 13 March 1998 |
Cuthbert Lilly: Cuthbert gets a job at a florists. Smart Arty: Smart Arty attempts to take his picture. The Handymen: Fruity Frozen Yoghurt. Question Mark: Waffle/Whisk/Bow Tie. Daisy Dares You: Daisy dares you to crawl across giant balloons. KIDS WIN
| 83 | 11 | "Episode 6.11" | 20 March 1998 |
Cuthbert Lilly: Cuthbert goes to an art class. Smart Arty: Smart Arty does some snake charming. The Handymen: Woolly Balloons. Question Mark: Watering Can/Grapes/Light Bulb. Daisy Dares You: Daisy dares you to walk on gunge stilts. DAISY WINS
| 84 | 12 | "Episode 6.12" | 27 March 1998 |
Cuthbert Lilly: Cuthbert tries to make his breakfast. Smart Arty: Smart Arty plays some basketball. The Handymen: Magic Rope Trick. Question Mark: Onion/Telephone/Wig. Daisy Dares You: Daisy dares you to collect some eggs. DAISY WINS
| 85 | 13 | "Episode 6.13" | 3 April 1998 |
Cuthbert Lilly: Cuthbert goes fencing. Smart Arty: Smart Arty attempts to clean up. The Handymen: Crazy Muffin Creatures. Question Mark: Padlock/Hat/Traffic Light. Daisy Dares You: Daisy dares you to do a tug of war competition.

=== Series 7 (1998) ===
| No. overall | No. in series | Title | Original release date |
|---|---|---|---|
| 86 | 1 | "Episode 7.1" | 1 September 1998 |
Cuthbert Lilly: Cuthbert joins the cricket club. Smart Arty: Smart Arty goes to the zoo. The Handymen: Balancing Ping Pong Ball. Question Mark: Train/Jelly/Armchair. Daisy Dares You: Daisy dares you to post a letter. KIDS WIN
| 87 | 2 | "Episode 7.2" | 8 September 1998 |
Cuthbert Lilly: Cuthbert has set up a shoe shining business. Smart Arty: Smart Arty plays a game of bowling skittles. The Handymen: Biting Bookmark. Question Mark: Hamburger. Daisy Dares You: Daisy dares you to make a trifle. DAISY WINS
| 88 | 3 | "Episode 7.3" | 15 September 1998 |
Cuthbert Lilly: Cuthbert is on a mission to get to the moon. Smart Arty: Smart Arty wants to walk his dog...but the canine has other ideas! The Handymen: Mini Roll Bees. Question Mark: Sponge/Balloons/Trophy. Daisy Dares You: Daisy dares you to catch a balloon in a net. KIDS WIN
| 89 | 4 | "Episode 7.4" | 22 September 1998 |
Cuthbert Lilly: Cuthbert is on babysitting duty. Smart Arty: Smart Arty goes kite flying on a windy day. The Handymen: Lion Card. Question Mark: Statue/Corn On The Cob/Fan. Daisy Dares You: Daisy dares you to play a buzzer game. DAISY WINS
| 90 | 5 | "Episode 7.5" | 29 September 1998 |
Cuthbert Lilly: Cuthbert goes to a pizza restaurant. Smart Arty: Smart Arty has trouble with his curtains and blinds. The Handymen: Eyeball Muffin. Question Mark: Pig. Daisy Dares You: Daisy dares you to place an egg into an eggcup. KIDS WIN
| 91 | 6 | "Episode 7.6" | 6 October 1998 |
Cuthbert Lilly: Cuthbert delivers newspapers in his latest job. Smart Arty: Smart Arty burns some rubber with his motorbike he has drawn. The Handymen: Teddy Bear Fridge Magnet. Question Mark: Lettuce/Cotton Reel. Daisy Dares You: Daisy dares you to be made up into a clown. DAISY WINS
| 92 | 7 | "Episode 7.7" | 13 October 1998 |
Cuthbert Lilly: Cuthbert goes down on the farm. Smart Arty: Smart Arty has some TV problems. The Handymen: Fairy Bread. Question Mark: Cement Mixer/Peach. Daisy Dares You: Daisy dares you to play a game of snakes and ladders in the swimming pool.
| 93 | 8 | "Episode 7.8" | 20 October 1998 |
Cuthbert Lilly: Cuthbert works as a children's entertainer. Smart Arty: Smart Arty plays around in the rain. The Handymen: Handy Mobile. Question Mark: Cow/Coat Hanger. Daisy Dares You: Daisy dares you to eat doughnuts and ice cream. DAISY WINS
| 94 | 9 | "Episode 7.9" | 27 October 1998 |
Cuthbert Lilly: Cuthbert causes havoc at a jumble sale. Smart Arty: Smart Arty goes bird watching. The Handymen: Magic Matchbox. Question Mark: Police Car/Sticky Tape/Ladder. Daisy Dares You: Daisy dares you to serve a rhubarb and custard pudding. KIDS WIN
| 95 | 10 | "Episode 7.10" | 3 November 1998 |
Cuthbert Lilly: Cuthbert busks to raise funds for a chocolate bar he desires. Smart Arty: Smart Arty has a bad back and needs to rest it. The Handymen: Rocket Cake. Question Mark: Shopping Trolley/Gift Bow. Daisy Dares You: Daisy dares you to toss a pancake. KIDS WIN
| 96 | 11 | "Episode 7.11" | 10 November 1998 |
Cuthbert Lilly: Cuthbert joins the scouts. Smart Arty: Smart Arty's windows are in need of a good clean. The Handymen: Escaping Hanky. Question Mark: Alarm Clock/Tennis Racket. Daisy Dares You: Daisy dares you to throw a hat onto a hat stand. KIDS WIN
| 97 | 12 | "Episode 7.12" | 17 November 1998 |
Cuthbert Lilly: Cuthbert re-decorates his living room. Smart Arty: Smart Arty draws some playground equipment to play with. The Handymen: Witches Brew. Question Mark: Computer/Rubber Gloves/Weather Vane. Daisy Dares You: Daisy dares you to make beans on toast. KIDS WIN
| 98 | 13 | "Episode 7.13" | 24 November 1998 |
Cuthbert Lilly: Cuthbert gets a job at the dog grooming parlour. Smart Arty: Smart Arty goes potty for pottery. The Handymen: Magic String. Question Mark: Saucepan/Sunglasses/Fireplace. Daisy Dares You: Daisy dares you to drink a milkshake. KIDS WIN
| 99 | 14 | "Episode 7.14" | 1 December 1998 |
Cuthbert Lilly: Cuthbert gets himself a computer. Smart Arty: Smart Arty goes apple picking. The Handymen: Handy Stand. Daisy Dares You: Daisy dares you to serve up a pie. KIDS WIN
| 100 | 15 | "Episode 7.15" | 8 December 1998 |
Cuthbert Lilly: Cuthbert tries to do the washing line and gets caught. Smart Arty: Smart Arty tries to clean his dirty car. The Handymen: Stripy Paint. Question Mark: Window. Daisy Dares You: Daisy dares you to her swimming pool castle. KIDS WIN
| 101 | 16 | "Episode 7.16" | 15 December 1998 |
Cuthbert Lilly: Cuthbert makes a splash on the lake when he goes surfing. Smart Arty: Smart Arty has trouble with a pesky crow in his garden. The Handymen: Jelly Beach Babies. Question Mark: Chest Of Drawers/Banana. Daisy Dares You: Daisy is causing trouble at a cake competition!

=== Series 8 (1999) ===
Series 8 saw the departure of Smart Arty and the inclusion of a new character – Minnie The Mini Magician, played by Sophie Aldred.

| No. overall | No. in series | Title | Original release date |
|---|---|---|---|
| 102 | 1 | "Episode 8.1" | 7 September 1999 |
Daisy Dares You: Daisy dares you to play a game of basketball. KIDS WIN; Cuthbert Lilly: Cuthbert goes to the fun park. The Handymen: Seal Cake. Minnie The Mini Magician: Minnie puts on a magic show.
| 103 | 2 | "Episode 8.2" | 14 September 1999 |
Minnie The Mini Magician: Minnie needs a new bicycle. Daisy Dares You: Daisy dares you to catch a fly. KIDS WIN; The Handymen: Trapeze Artist. Cuthbert Lilly: Cuthbert causes mayhem in a joke shop.
| 104 | 3 | "Episode 8.3" | 21 September 1999 |
Cuthbert Lilly: Cuthbert turns detective to solve a rather paculiar mystery. Minnie The Mini Magician: Minnie impatiently uses her magic to help make her flower grow faster. The Handymen: Stone Man. Daisy Dares You: Daisy dares you to complete a jigsaw puzzle. KIDS WIN
| 105 | 4 | "Episode 8.4" | 28 September 1999 |
Daisy Dares You: Daisy dares you to put old syrup on her waffles. DAISY WINS; Handymen: Cup Magic. Question Mark: Cauliflower. Cuthbert Lilly: Cuthbert has some troubles putting up a billboard. Minnie The Mini Magician: Minnie's having bedtime trouble.
| 106 | 5 | "Episode 8.5" | 5 October 1999 |
Minnie The Mini Magician: Minnie attempts to decorate. Eyes In Leaves: Koala Bear. Daisy Dares You: Daisy dares you to a game of splat the rat. KIDS WIN; The Handymen: Moving Cards. Cuthbert Lilly: Cuthbert has a cold.
| 107 | 6 | "Episode 8.6" | 12 October 1999 |
Cuthbert Lilly: Cuthbert goes rock climbing. Daisy Dares You: Daisy dares you to knock down 10 green bottles. Dot To Dot: Trumpet. The Handymen: Spotty Dog. Minnie The Mini Magician: Minnie hits the beach, for some fun in the sun.
| 108 | 7 | "Episode 8.7" | 19 October 1999 |
Minnie The Mini Magician: Minnie wants to buy a new hat, she just needs some money! Daisy Dares You: Daisy dares you to spell her name. DAISY WINS; The Handymen: Traffic Light Sandwich. Cuthbert Lilly: Cuthbert's aunt is coming to visit.
| 109 | 8 | "Episode 8.8" | 26 October 1999 |
Daisy Dares You: Daisy dares you to clean the windows. Eye: Clowns. The Handymen: Floating paper clip. Cuthbert Lilly: Cuthbert goes for his eye test. Minnie The Mini Magician: Minnie attempts to bake a cake.
| 110 | 9 | "Episode 8.9" | 2 November 1999 |
Cuthbert Lilly: Cuthbert takes part in sports day. Daisy Dares You: Daisy dares you to eat a cream cake. DAISY WINS; Dot To Dot: Roller-blades. The Handymen: Sparkling surprise drink. Minnie The Mini Magician: Minnie has a leaky tap.
| 111 | 10 | "Episode 8.10" | 9 November 1999 |
Daisy Dares You: Daisy dares you to make a fried breakfast. KIDS WIN; Minnie The Mini Magician: Minnie washes her clothes. The Handymen: Monster in a lake. Eye: Old Ladies. Cuthbert Lilly: Cuthbert becomes an ice cream man.
| 112 | 11 | "Episode 8.11" | 16 November 1999 |
Minnie The Mini Magician: Minnie experiments with her hair. Cuthbert Lilly: Cuthbert causes chaos at the country fair. Eyes In Leaves: Rhinoceros. The Handymen: Crocodile Pegs. Daisy Dares You: Daisy dares you to ice a cake. DAISY WINS
| 113 | 12 | "Episode 8.12" | 23 November 1999 |
Cuthbert Lilly: Cuthbert goes cycling. The Handymen: The indestructible string. Question Mark: Bicycle. Daisy Dares You: Daisy dares you to play coconut shy. KIDS WIN; Minnie The Mini Magician: Minnie goes fishing.
| 114 | 13 | "Episode 8.13" | 30 November 1999 |
Daisy Dares You: Daisy dares you to paint a picture. DAISY WINS; Eye: Aliens. Minnie The Mini Magician: Minnie uses her magic to help with doing the household chores. The Handymen: The Hypnotising Handkerchief. Eyes In Leaves: Goldfish/Cat. Cuthbert Lilly: Cuthbert gets ready to go on holiday.

=== Series 9 (2000) ===
Series 9 saw the departure of Deborah McCallum as Daisy Dares, and the arrival of Claire Macaulay taking up the role.

| No. overall | No. in series | Title | Original release date |
|---|---|---|---|
| 115 | 1 | "Episode 9.1" | 7 September 2000 |
Cuthbert Lilly: Cuthbert arrives at the airport. Minnie The Mini Magician: Minnie wants to fly. Dot To Dot: Wheelbarrow. The Handymen: Non - Melting Ice Cream. Daisy Dares You: Daisy dares you to blow some bubbles. KIDS WIN
| 116 | 2 | "Episode 9.2" | 14 September 2000 |
Minnie The Mini Magician: Minnie has problems trying to get rid of a pesky mouse. The Handymen: Hanky Magic. Eye: Elves. Cuthbert Lilly: Cuthbert applies for the job of butler at a stately home. Daisy Dares You: Daisy dares you to make a sandwich. KIDS WIN
| 117 | 3 | "Episode 9.3" | 21 September 2000 |
Daisy Dares You: Daisy dares you to present her a bowl of fruit. DAISY WINS; Minnie The Mini Magician: Minnie puts her magical powers to the test, in becoming a superhero. Eyes In Leaves: Gorilla. The Handymen: Alien Pencil. Cuthbert Lilly: Cuthbert thinks that everyone has forgotten his birthday... Or have they?!
| 118 | 4 | "Episode 9.4" | 28 September 2000 |
Cuthbert Lilly: Cuthbert goes to stay at a hotel. Minnie The Mini Magician: Minnie plays a crazy round of golf. Question Mark: Boat. The Handymen: Rude Roll. Daisy Dares You: Daisy dares you to save some goals in a game of football. KIDS WIN
| 119 | 5 | "Episode 9.5" | 5 October 2000 |
Daisy Dares You: Daisy dares you to a spot of fishing. KIDS WIN; Cuthbert Lilly: Cuthbert pays a visit to the athletics stadium. Eyes In Leaves: Bat. The Handymen: Magic Envelope. Eye: Boomerang. Minnie The Mini Magician: Minnie has found herself in a very cold climate and desperately needs to keep warm!
| 120 | 6 | "Episode 9.6" | 12 October 2000 |
Cuthbert Lilly: Cuthbert gets a job at the garden centre. Question Mark: Washing Basket. The Handymen: Wobbly Pig. Daisy Dares You: Daisy dares you to serve spaghetti bolognese. DAISY WINS; Eyes In Leaves: Guinea Pig. Minnie The Mini Magician: Minnie puts her fitness skills to the test.
| 121 | 7 | "Episode 9.7" | 19 October 2000 |
Daisy Dares You: Daisy dares you to build a tower of building blocks. KIDS WIN; Dot To Dot: Castle. The Handymen: Expanding Card. Cuthbert Lilly: Cuthbert goes for a bus journey like no other! Question Mark: Watermelon. Minnie The Mini Magician: Minnie has trouble trying to fix a hole in her wall.
| 122 | 8 | "Episode 9.8" | 26 October 2000 |
Cuthbert Lilly: Cuthbert gets a job as a road cleaner. The Handymen: Stripey Slush Drink. Minnie The Mini Magician: Minnie plays with some musical instruments. Eye: Mermaids. Daisy Dares You: Daisy dares you to play her maze game. KIDS WIN
| 123 | 9 | "Episode 9.9" | 9 November 2000 |
Daisy Dares You: Daisy dares you to make honey on toast. KIDS WIN; The Handymen: Stencil Rocket. Eyes In Leaves: Walrus. Minnie The Mini Magician: Minnie's feeling under the weather and has a bad case of pox! Cuthbert Lilly: Cuthbert goes kart racing.
| 124 | 10 | "Episode 9.10" | 16 November 2000 |
Cuthbert Lilly: Cuthbert goes to the library. Minnie The Mini Magician: Minnie goes camping. Eyes in Leaves: Bear. The Handymen: Water Magic. Daisy Dares You: Daisy dares you to decorate a hot dog with tomato ketchup, mustard and relish. DAISY WINS
| 125 | 11 | "Episode 9.11" | 23 November 2000 |
Daisy Dares You: Daisy dares you to collect her washing. DAISY WINS; Question Mark: Tractor. The Handymen: Volcano. Minnie The Mini Magician: Minnie tries to make herself a new dress. Dot To Dot: Banana. Cuthbert Lilly: Cuthbert desperately needs to find the perfect present for Daisy's birthday.
| 126 | 12 | "Episode 9.12" | 30 November 2000 |
Cuthbert Lilly: Cuthbert is put through his paces at an assault course. The Handymen: Bouncing Bee. Eyes In Leaves: Camel. Minnie The Mini Magician: Minnie magics herself a pet dog. Daisy Dares You: Daisy dares you to add the cherry on the cake. KIDS WIN
| 127 | 13 | "Episode 9.13" | 7 December 2000 |
Daisy Dares You: Daisy dares you to play a game of rugby. The Handymen: Enchanted Necklace. Eye: Astronauts. Minnie The Mini Magician: Minnie wants to make a self portrait. Cuthbert Lilly: Cuthbert gets a job at the beauty parlour.

=== Series 10 (2001) ===
The final series of ZZZap! Series 10 saw the departure of the giant comic for transitions, which were replaced by CGI graphics.

| No. overall | No. in series | Title | Original release date |
|---|---|---|---|
| 128 | 1 | "Episode 10.1" | 3 September 2001 |
Cuthbert Lilly: Cuthbert goes on a date with his girlfriend. Minnie The Mini Magician: Minnie goes on a jungle expedition. Magnifying Glass: Unicorn. The Handymen: Fantastic Fish. Daisy Dares You: Daisy dares you to feed a frog. DAISY WINS
| 129 | 2 | "Episode 10.2" | 4 September 2001 |
Daisy Dares You: Daisy dares you to insert a coin into a piggy bank. KIDS WIN; Dot to Dot: Crane. Minnie The Mini Magician: Minnie has a new magic wand to play with. The Handymen: Cheesy Feet. Eyes in Leaves: Jellyfish. Cuthbert Lilly: Cuthbert gets a job at a building site.
| 130 | 3 | "Episode 10.3" | 5 September 2001 |
Cuthbert Lilly: Cuthbert has a go at playing basketball. The Handymen: Ice Man. Eye: Robots. Minnie The Mini Magician: Minnie blasts off into outer space for an intergalactic adventure! Daisy Dares You: Daisy dares you to serve some milkshakes. DAISY WINS
| 131 | 4 | "Episode 10.4" | 6 September 2001 |
Minnie The Mini Magician: Minnie has an encounter with a local outlaw in the wild west! Question Mark: Sandwich. Cuthbert Lilly: Cuthbert goes bird watching. The Handymen: Cheese Box Challenge. Dot to Dot: Igloo. Daisy Dares You: Daisy dares you to collect some eggs. KIDS WIN
| 132 | 5 | "Episode 10.5" | 7 September 2001 |
Cuthbert Lilly: Cuthbert is put through his paces at the health club! Minnie The Mini Magician: Minnie has fun playing in the snow. Question Mark: Helicopter. The Handymen: Double Your Money. Daisy Dares You: Daisy dares you to paint a picture. DAISY WINS
| 133 | 6 | "Episode 10.6" | 10 September 2001 |
Minnie The Mini Magician: Minnie learns how to dance. Eye: Firemen. The Handymen: Lucky Lady. Cuthbert Lilly: Cuthbert gets a job as a removal man. Magnifying Glass: Caterpillar. Daisy Dares You: Daisy dares you to get a toy race car from start to finish. KIDS WIN
| 134 | 7 | "Episode 10.7" | 11 September 2001 |
Daisy Dares You: Daisy dares you to make beans on toast. KIDS WIN; Eyes in Leaves: Pig. Minnie The Mini Magician: Minnie magics up a robot to do her household chores. The Handymen: Ring Ping Pong. Question Mark: Clouds. Cuthbert Lilly: Cuthbert visits a music shop.
| 135 | 8 | "Episode 10.8" | 12 September 2001 |
Cuthbert Lilly: Cuthbert hurries to catch a train on time. Minnie The Mini Magician: Minnie goes kite flying. Eye: Plates of Food. The Handymen: Chewy Chequers. Daisy Dares You: Daisy dares you to make an ice cream. DAISY WINS
| 136 | 9 | "Episode 10.9" | 13 September 2001 |
Cuthbert Lilly: Cuthbert sets up a home cleaning service. Minnie The Mini Magician: Minnie plays with some toys. Dot to Dot: Piggy Bank. The Handymen: Chatterbox. Daisy Dares You: Daisy dares you to eat a doughnut. DAISY WINS
| 137 | 10 | "Episode 10.10" | 14 September 2001 |
Cuthbert Lilly: Cuthbert arrives at the office, for his first day on the job! Magnifying Glass: Caravan. Minnie The Mini Magician: Minnie grows her own vegetables. The Handymen: Eggy Friend. Question Mark: Castle. Daisy Dares You: Daisy dares you to serve a trifle. DAISY WINS
| 138 | 11 | "Episode 10.11" | 17 September 2001 |
Daisy Dares You: Daisy dares you to a game of tennis. KIDS WIN; The Handymen: Cola Surprise. Question Mark: Hairbrush. Minnie The Mini Magician: Minnie plays some football. Cuthbert Lilly: Cuthbert goes on a picnic.
| 139 | 12 | "Episode 10.12" | 18 September 2001 |
Cuthbert Lilly: Cuthbert goes to an evening class. Minnie The Mini Magician: Minnie turns detective to solve the mystery of her missing hat. Eye: Men. The Handymen: Changing Faces. Daisy Dares You: Daisy dares you to add the pièce de résistance to a cake. KIDS WIN
| 140 | 13 | "Episode 10.13" | 19 September 2001 |
Daisy Dares You: Daisy dares you to put some tomato ketchup on a burger. KIDS WIN; The Handymen: Fizzy Fruit. Dot to Dot: Scissors. Minnie The Mini Magician: Minnie goes on a treasure hunt. Cuthbert Lilly: Cuthbert needs to do a food shop... That's if he can even leave the house!
| 141 | 14 | "Episode 10.14" | 20 September 2001 |
Cuthbert Lilly: Cuthbert gives his garden a makeover. Minnie The Mini Magician: Minnie has invited Daisy round for tea. Eyes in Leaves: Penguin. The Handymen: Handshake. Daisy Dares You: Daisy dares you to collect some rubber ducks. KIDS WIN
| 142 | 15 | "Episode 10.15" | 21 September 2001 |
Cuthbert Lilly: Cuthbert goes on a shopping spree, after clearing out his entire wardrobe! Minnie The Mini Magician: Minnie clowns around at the circus. Magnifying Glass: Platypus. The Handymen: Wrapper Rocket. Daisy Dares You: Daisy dares you to disrupt the mayor’s birthday party. KIDS WIN
