= BFBS 4 =

- Country: United Kingdom
- Broadcast area: United Kingdom; Ascension Island; Bahrain; Brunei; Canada; Cyprus; Diego Garcia; Estonia; Germany; Gibraltar; Falkland Islands; Nepal; Singapore
- Network: BFBS Television
- Headquarters: Broadcasting House, London, United Kingdom

Programming
- Language: English
- Picture format: 1080p (SDTV)

Ownership
- Owner: British Forces Broadcasting Service
- Sister channels: BFBS 1; BFBS 2; BFBS 3 Kids

History
- Launched: 2 May 2009; 17 years ago
- Closed: 27 March 2013; 13 years ago

Availability

Terrestrial
- BFBS's DTT service: Channel 4

BFBS 4 was a British television channel owned and operated by the British Forces Broadcasting Service. It started broadcasting on 2 May 2009 and delivered two movies, repeated for up to six times a day to cater to different timezones. Selected programmes from CBeebies and CBBC were relayed live.

The channel replaced Sky News in its existing slot on BFBS's satellite and digital terrestrial multiplexes.

The channel was discontinued on 27 March 2013. To compensate for its loss, BFBS planned the creation of "extra entertainment channels" at Op Herrick, later in the year. BFBS also justified the decision on the movies seen on the newly acquired relays of BBC One, BBC Two and ITV as well as the new in-house BFBS Extra channel. Currently, BFBS provides a composite feed of Sky Cinema.
