= BFBS 2 =

- Country: United Kingdom
- Broadcast area: United Kingdom; Ascension Island; Bahrain; Brunei; Canada; Cyprus; Diego Garcia; Estonia; Germany; Gibraltar; Falkland Islands; Nepal; Singapore
- Network: BFBS Television
- Headquarters: Broadcasting House, London, United Kingdom

Programming
- Language: English
- Picture format: 576i (SDTV)

Ownership
- Owner: British Forces Broadcasting Service
- Sister channels: BFBS 1; BFBS 3 Kids; BFBS 4

History
- Launched: December 2001; 24 years ago
- Closed: 27 March 2013; 13 years ago

Availability

Terrestrial
- BFBS's DTT service: Channel 2 (usually)

BFBS 2 was a British television channel owned and operated by the British Forces Broadcasting Service. The channel was positioned itself as the "lads' channel" and aimed at an all-male audience, featuring sports, reality shows and TV series. Throughout its existence, the channel ran on a six-hour block to cater to several time zones.

The channel closed down in March 2013 in favour of BFBS Extra.

== History ==
The channel was introduced as part of a package of measures to enhance BFBS's television services, especially among lonely servicemen and servicewomen. The channel ran from 6pm to midnight and was initially available only in the Balkans. Launched just before Christams 2001, its highlights included live football from the Premiership, the Scottish Premiership and the National League. The existing BFBS channel, renamed BFBS 1, continued aiming at families. In Cyprus, only BFBS 1 had terrestrial coverage, and was unaffected by the 2009 decision to shut down its analogue transmitter networks. It was widely available to non-entitled Cypriots until June 2011, when a TV card pirate was detained by the authorities.

On 4 April 2006, BFBS 2 launched terrestrially to civilians in Tristan da Cunha, three years after BFBS 1 was made available live. Upgrades to the BFBS terrestrial network in the Falkland Islands made BFBS 2 viewable in December 2009.

As part of a change to the BFBS services, and with the introduction of live and time-shifted relays of BBC One and ITV (depending on the timezone), the channel was discontinued on 27 March 2013. The channel slot on DTT receivers was replaced by a composite feed consisting of CBBC during the daytime and BBC Two from the early evening.
