= BFBS 1 =

- Country: United Kingdom
- Broadcast area: United Kingdom; Ascension Island; Bahrain; Brunei; Canada; Cyprus; Diego Garcia; Estonia; Germany; Gibraltar; Falkland Islands; Nepal; Singapore
- Network: BFBS Television
- Headquarters: Broadcasting House, London, United Kingdom

Programming
- Language: English
- Picture format: 576i (SDTV)

Ownership
- Owner: British Forces Broadcasting Service
- Sister channels: BFBS 2; BFBS 3 Kids; BFBS 4

History
- Launched: 18 September 1975; 50 years ago
- Closed: March 2013; 13 years ago
- Former names: BFBS Television (18 September 1975 – September 1985); SSVC Television (September 1985 – 1997); BFBS (1997 – 2001)

Availability

Terrestrial
- BFBS's DTT service: Channel 1 (usually)

BFBS 1 was a British television channel owned and operated by the British Forces Broadcasting Service. It was the corporation's oldest and flagship channel, airing mainstream programming, often sourced from BBC One and ITV.

The channel was launched in 1975 in Celle, West Germany, and initially catered to British military bases stationed there. By the late 1980s, with an increased broadcast footprint (coinciding with the launch in Cyprus, the channel was renamed SSVC Television, but had its name reverted to BFBS Television in 1997. Following the launch of the male-oriented BFBS 2 in 2001, the channel was renamed BFBS 1.

The channel closed down in March 2013 in favour of the new BFBS service, which led to the creation of BFBS Extra and BFBS Sport; the regular BFBS 1 channel was subsequently replaced by relays of BBC One and ITV.

== History ==
Proposals for a BFBS Television service have been suggested as early as 1959, following the success of its radio service. Plans included the airing of its programmes on German television, sending videotapes over the garrisons and airborne broadcasting over Germany.

BFBS Television started in Celle, near Hanover in the then West Germany, on 18 September 1975 from Trenchard Barracks. Continuity announced Hilary Osborne opened the service. The service was a three-way joint collaboration between BFBS, the BBC and London Weekend Television - the last of which provided technical support for the new service.

This used taped broadcasts from the BBC and ITV, flown to Germany from London, which were then rebroadcast using low-power UHF transmitters. The transmitters did not interfere with the West German channels and were low-power on purpose to prevent illegal viewing due to rights issues. A BFBS engineer removed adverts at an editing room that had two large video tape machines. But there were limitations: BFBS only had four video tape machines, and when two were in use for video editing, the spare units were taping from BBC One and BBC Two, making the airing of ITV programming unviable at the time. Most of the recorded material was British, but popular US TV series and movies were, at the time, nearly impossible to air because of costly rights issues.

A live link from London began in December 1982, using a microwave link between the UK and West Germany, extending as far east as West Berlin. This enabled servicemen to finally receive live news and sport broadcasts from the UK, initially with one transmitter, which was fed through 45 microwave links that were spread between south-eastern England, France, Belgium and the Netherlands before reaching Germany. The channel now relayed the ITN News at 545 and the BBC Nine O'Clock News. The feat was mentioned on both news bulletins.

The BFBS TV service used the 625-line PAL system, used in the UK as well as West Germany. By 1982, it was available at 50 sites throughout northern and central regions of West Germany.

In September 1985, coinciding with the launch of the service in Cyprus, the channel was renamed SSVC Television (Services Sound and Vision Corporation). By then, it had added programmes from Channel 4 to the mix, which had been launched in 1982. Its own programming at the time of the rename included a daily birthday slot for children and a regular magazine programme on Forces activities. On 4 December 1986, SSVC started television broadcasts to the Falkland Islands. Areas without access to an SSVC station received seven three-hour video cassettes with taped British programming, which was later distributed to on-camp closed-circuit systems. By the early 1990s, SSVC began delivering its service via satellite to the bases in Europe.

In 1997, it reverted to the BFBS name.

Since the 1990s, it broadcasts live via satellite. For Christmas 1997, it unveiled a live service for the Falkland Islands, which up until then relied on two-week old video tapes. DVDs are still sent to forces serving in more remote areas. The early 2000s saw the start of a service known as Navy TV, which broadcast time-shifted versions of the channel to Royal Navy vessels around the world via military satellite.

With the launch of BFBS 2 in 2001, the channel was renamed BFBS 1. In 2002, BFBS upgraded its equipment. A 2007 survey carried out in Iraq suggested the creation of an 18-hour timeshift channel, 1 Day Later, as the viewer base in the region was missing out on primetime programming. The feed launched on 11 February 2008. BFBS 2 remained unchanged because it ran on a six-hour wheel to cater to multiple time zones.

As part of a change to the BFBS services, and with the introduction of live and time-shifted relays of BBC One and ITV (depending on the time zone), the channel was discontinued on 27 March 2013.

=== Availability ===
BFBS Television was broadcast in some areas as a terrestrial service in the clear using low-power transmitters to minimise "overspill" to non-service audiences and protect copyright. Despite this, it could be received in West Berlin, and its listings were carried in local German language magazines. However, the signal was largely confined to the British Sector, reflecting the situation with its American counterpart, AFN TV, whose signal was similarly limited to the American Sector.

Until 1997, it was also widely available in Cyprus, but its signal was encrypted or confined to the Sovereign Base Areas of Akrotiri and Dhekelia. Following complaints from local broadcasters like Lumiere TV, which had bought local rights to show English football and other programming, the decision was made to encrypt the signal, starting with Nicosia in April 1997 and ending with Larnaca and Limassol in May 1998. The decision was criticised by MPs in an Early Day Motion. BFBS later ended terrestrial transmissions of its TV channel in Cyprus in January 2009.

However, as a result of card sharing by services personnel, BFBS TV (later BFBS 1) was available to unentitled viewers on the island, along with other channels until 2011, when an illegal pay-TV service was closed down in a joint operation by the Cyprus Police and the Audiovisual Anti-Piracy Alliance.

In the Falkland Islands, SSVC TV was originally only available to entitled viewers in Mount Pleasant, and when a repeater in Sapper Hill was installed by civilians to relay the signal to Stanley in 1988, it was shut down owing to issues related to broadcasting rights for US programming. It was only on Christmas Eve of that year that the service became available to civilian residents. Initially this consisted of prerecorded programmes brought over on cassette from the UK, meaning that they were shown two weeks after the UK, However, in 1997, the channel, by now rebranded as BFBS, was broadcast via satellite, enabling news and sport to be shown on the same day as they had been shown in the UK, but timeshifted by three to four hours to take account of the time difference. This expanded the civilian terrestrial TV service as part of a digital upgrade, which included BFBS 1 and BFBS 2. BFBS 1 and 2 also became available to civilian audiences in Tristan da Cunha.
