= BFBS 3 Kids =

- Country: United Kingdom
- Broadcast area: United Kingdom; Ascension Island; Bahrain; Brunei; Canada; Cyprus; Diego Garcia; Estonia; Germany; Gibraltar; Falkland Islands; Nepal; Singapore
- Network: BFBS Television
- Headquarters: Broadcasting House, London, United Kingdom

Programming
- Language: English
- Picture format: 1080p (SDTV)

Ownership
- Owner: British Forces Broadcasting Service
- Sister channels: BFBS 1; BFBS 2; BFBS 4

History
- Launched: 2 May 2009; 17 years ago
- Closed: 27 March 2013; 13 years ago

Availability

Terrestrial
- BFBS's DTT service: Channel 3

BFBS 3 Kids was a British children's television channel owned and operated by the British Forces Broadcasting Service. It ran from 5am to 6pm GMT and delivered a variety of children's programmes seen on the UK terrestrial networks, mainly sourced from CBBC and CITV. With the launch of the channel, Room 785 and its team moved from BFBS 1. Selected programmes from CBeebies and CBBC were relayed live.

The physical slot used to carry the channel was previously occupied by The Hits, which was renamed 4Music in 2008.

The channel was discontinued on 27 March 2013. Children's programmes were now served by the CBBC part of the composite BBC Two feed.
