= British Defence Film Library =

Coordinates: 51°36′49″N 0°34′36″W

The British Defence Film Library (BDFL) is part of the Services Sound and Vision Corporation and is responsible for maintaining the library and distribution of military training and recruitment film, CD-ROMs and training packs.

It was founded in April 1996 under a MoD contract. The BDFL supplies the training programmes to the Royal Navy, British Army and Royal Air Force. It has a library of approximately 3,500 titles from over 40 years. New programmes are added to the library as they are made.
