= The Western Brothers =

English music hall duo

The Western Brothers were an English music hall and radio act, who were popular from the 1930s to the late 1950s, performing self-written topical songs which often lampooned the upper classes. Kenneth Alfred Western (10 September 1899 – 24 January 1963) and (Ernest) George Western (23 July 1895 – 16 August 1969) were, in reality, second cousins rather than brothers. They first broadcast as the Perfectly Polite Pair in the 1920s, and there was then a long break before they returned as the Western Brothers.

George provided the piano accompaniment to their songs. They wore monocles and evening dress for their act, and affected upper-class drawls. Photographs of them appeared in newspaper advertisements for a number of products. From this and from their act, they made enough money to be able to afford to tour the variety circuit flying in their own aeroplane and to stay in the best hotels. Their songs included "We're Frightfully BBC" and "Keeping Up the Old Traditions".

The Western Brothers appeared in the 1934 film Mr. Cinders with Clifford Mollison and Zelma O'Neal. They wrote and sang two songs: "I Think of You, Dear" and "Aren't We All?" in the reversed roles of "ugly stepsisters". The following year they appeared as announcers in Radio Parade of 1935 with Will Hay.

In October 1948 they became involved in a controversy because of a joke that Kenneth told between songs during a live performance on the BBC Home Service. The punchline of the joke appeared to suggest that Hugh Gaitskell, then the Minister of Fuel and Power, was guilty of nepotism. The press made a big fuss about this. The BBC edited the joke from the repeat of the programme a few days later, and also broadcast a joint apology from themselves and the Western Brothers. In reply the Brothers received a letter from the Solicitor-General:

Mr Gaitskell is happy to accept your assurance that no personal reflection was ever intended. He desires me to add that a number of people have asked him whether he has, in fact, got a nephew in the employ of the National Coal Board which shows how readily there is assumed to be a substratum of fact behind such jokes. However, for Mr Gaitskell, and I hope for you, the matter is now at an end.

There was no lasting impact on their career and they continued to appear on both radio and TV throughout the following decade.

A BBC Radio 4 programme describing their career was broadcast on 22 November 2012 entitled Mockery with Monocles: The Western Brothers Revealed.
