= BFBS Live Events =

BFBS Live Events (formerly Combined Services Entertainment (CSE) until 2 March 2020) is the live entertainment arm of the British Forces Broadcasting Service (BFBS) (and prior to March 2020 the Services Sound and Vision Corporation (SSVC), a registered British charity). It is the official provider of live entertainment to the British Armed Forces. BFBS Live Events routinely sends tours of entertainment to Afghanistan, Cyprus, Oman, the Falkland Islands and to Royal Navy ships deployed worldwide.

== History ==
BFBS Live Events/CSE is the successor to the Entertainments National Service Association (ENSA). Originally, it was called the Central Pool of Artists. It emerged during and after the Second World War as the British Armed Forces' concert party.

== Artists ==
Artists who began their careers in the Central Pool of Artists, and later the CSE, included Benny Hill, Kenneth Williams, Spike Milligan, Stanley Baxter, Edmund Purdom, Ken Platt and Peter Nichols. Nichols later adapted his experiences into a 1977 stage play (and later film) called Privates on Parade.

In later years, James Fox undertook many CSE tours to entertain British troops on active service in Afghanistan, Bosnia, The Falkland Islands and Iraq. In recognition of this, he was twice invited to perform at the Royal Albert Hall before the Queen as part of the Festival of Remembrance. In 2004, he presented a film highlighting the work of CSE before his performance.

== See also ==
- Concert party (entertainment)
- Entertainments National Service Association
- United Services Organization (USO); the United States equivalent
