= Services Sound and Vision Corporation =

Defunct entertainment sevice for the British armed forces

- Type: Charity
- Founded: 1982
- Defunct: 23 July 2020; 6 years ago
- Headquarters: United Kingdom
- Website: ssvc.com

The Services Sound and Vision Corporation (SSVC) was a British registered charity.

Set up in 1982 from the merger of the Services Kinema Corporation (SKC) and the British Forces Broadcasting Service (BFBS) to "entertain and inform Britain's Armed Forces around the world", its activities included the British Forces Broadcasting Service with its radio and television operations, SSVC Cinemas, the British Defence Film Library, and its live events arm, Combined Services Entertainment (a successor to ENSA).

== History ==
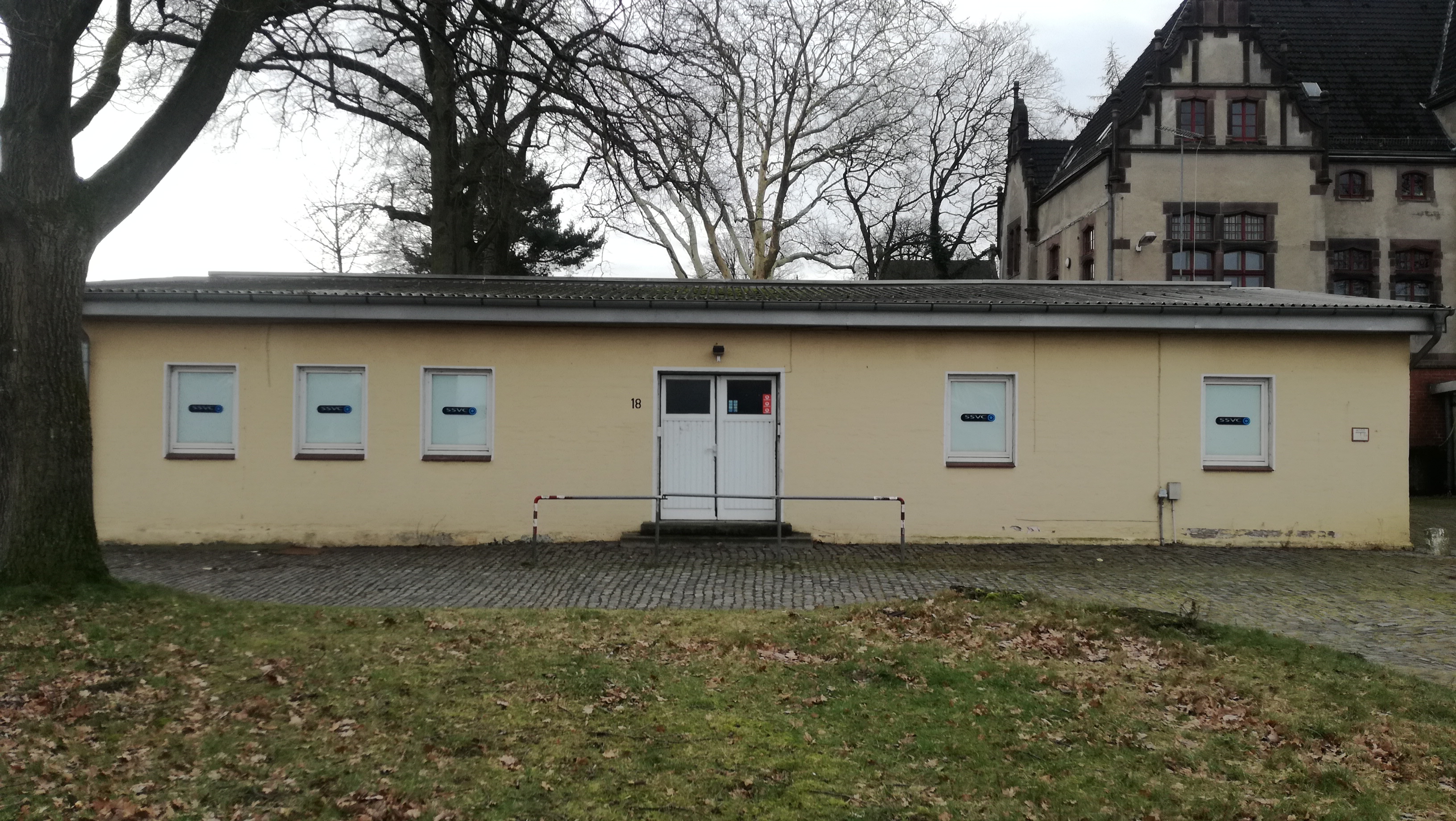
Old SSVC facility at the former British barracks in Osnabrück, Germany

A new ten-year contract began on 1 April 2013 awarded by the Ministry of Defence. SSVC/BFBS will continue to provide services to the British armed forces in the UK and where deployed abroad. Its current Chief Executive Officer is Simon Bucks (born 1952; from Sky News).

The operations of SSVC were changed on 2 March 2020 when it and most of the properties under its management were rebranded under the new BFBS and Forces brandings. The official name of the entity was changed to BFBS on 23 July 2020.

== Former managing directors/chief executives ==
1. 1982–1988: John Grist (1924–2017; BBC)
2. 1988–1993: Alan Protheroe (1934–2013; BBC)
3. 1993–2005: David Crwys-Williams (1940–; Air vice-marshal)
4. 2005–2009: Alastair Duncan (1952–2016; Major-general)
5. 2009–2015: Nick Pollard (1950–; Sky News)

== See also ==
- Army Kinematograph Service
- British Forces Broadcasting Service
