= British Forces Broadcasting Service =

Radio and TV service for the British military

Coordinates: 51°35′17.53″N 0°33′11.94″W

- Type: Armed forces media (UK)
- Founded: 1943; 83 years ago
- Broadcast area: United Kingdom; Ascension Island; Bahrain; Brunei; Canada; Cyprus; Diego Garcia; Estonia; Germany; Gibraltar; Falkland Islands; Nepal; Singapore
- Key people: Queen Camilla (patron); Ben Chapman (CEO); Christopher Wilson (chairman of the board of trustees)
- Former names: Forces Broadcasting Service; British Forces Network
- BFBS Radio: See list
- Official website: bfbs.com

The British Forces Broadcasting Service (BFBS) provides radio and television programmes for the British Armed Forces, and their dependents worldwide. Editorial control is independent of the Ministry of Defence and the armed forces themselves. It was established by the British War Office (now the Ministry of Defence) in 1943. In 1944, it was managed by Gale Pedrick.

== History ==
Former logo, used until March 2020

Originally known as the Forces Broadcasting Service (FBS), it was initially under the control of the British Army Welfare Service, its first effort, the Middle East Broadcasting Unit, being headquartered in Cairo.

Before and after the end of the Second World War various radio stations were set up, some using the FBS name, others using the name British Forces Network (BFN), but by the early 1960s these had all adopted the BFBS name.

From 1982 until 2020, BFBS formed part of the Services Sound and Vision Corporation (SSVC), a registered charity which is also responsible for the British Defence Film Library, SSVC Cinemas (now BFBS Cinemas), and Combined Services Entertainment (CSE; now BFBS Live Events), providing entertainment for HM Forces around the world. In March 2020, most of the properties under the SSVC umbrella were rebranded under the new BFBS and Forces brandings. On 23 July 2020, SSVC was renamed BFBS. BFBS does not carry commercial advertising.

== BFBS Radio ==
BFBS Radio
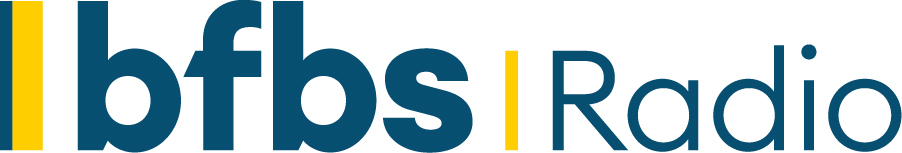
- Type: Division
- Industry: Mass media
- Founded: 1943; 83 years ago
- Headquarters: Chalfont Grove Teleport, Chalfont St Peter, Buckinghamshire, United Kingdom
- Area served: Worldwide
- Services: Radio broadcasting
- Revenue: £28,774,000
- Owner: BFBS
- Number of employees: 213 (2017)
- Parent: British Forces Broadcasting Service
- Website: www.bfbs.com/help/frequencies

BFBS Radio operates 22 radio stations, broadcast on a combination of local DAB, FM and AM frequencies, online and on digital television. BFBS Radio is a music, news, entertainment and community service providing bespoke content to the global Forces Community with a focus on Forces News and connecting the Forces communities around the world.

=== Broadcasting ===
BFBS broadcasts to service personnel and their families and friends worldwide with local radio studios in Belize, Brunei, Canada, Cyprus, Germany, Gibraltar, the Falkland Islands, Nepal and operational areas. In addition, BFBS the Forces Station is heard by troops in Ascension Island, Bahrain, Belgium, Bosnia, Estonia, and the Netherlands, as well as onboard Royal Navy ships at sea via live satellite links, online at BFBS Radio, on Sky channel 0211 in the United Kingdom only, via an Astra 2 transponder and on Freesat channel 786.

From 12 January 2008, BFBS began a trial period of broadcasting nationwide across the UK on DAB, which ran until 31 March 2008. Audience research carried out during the trial concluded that it was successful and broadcasts continued for eight years until 6 March 2017 when the service ceased due to the cost to the charity SSVC.

On 1 April 2013, BFBS began a new 10-year contract for to supply all forces broadcasting service to British troops around the world and expanded its service to UK army bases formerly served by Garrison Radio. BFBS UK base stations now broadcast using DAB in Aldershot, Aldergrove, Blandford, Bovington, Brize Norton, Bulford, Catterick, Colchester, Edinburgh, Fort George, Holywood, Inverness, Lisburn, and Portsmouth.

=== Programming ===
Bespoke news bulletins are broadcast every hour, 24 hours a day, utilising content from BBC News, IRN and BFBS's own team of Forces News reporters. The standard bulletin is three minutes long, with extended ten-minute Forces News programmes on weekdays at 0400, 0700, 1100, 1300 and 1700 UK time. Two-minute-long news and sport headlines are broadcast on the half-hour during breakfast programming. Bulletins are broadcast around the clock on BFBS 1 (The Forces Station) and BFBS Gurkha Radio, and during BFBS Radio 2's music programming.

Many of the programmes on BFBS Radio 2 are sourced from BBC Radio 4 and BBC Radio 5 Live, including the soap opera The Archers, which was popular in Hong Kong until BFBS Radio ceased broadcasting on 30 June 1997 before the handover to China. BFBS UK is a contemporary hit 'pop' station. It is similar in style to BBC Radio 2, playing current music and chat, as well as regular news bulletins.

On 31 May 2010, BBC Radio 1 teamed up with BFBS to transmit the 10-hour takeover show from Camp Bastion with BFBS presenters and shout outs from the military community. It repeated the link-up in 2011.

In December 2011, the UK's Smooth Radio broadcast its national breakfast show, presented by Simon Bates, from the BFBS studios in Camp Bastion. On 8 April 2012, Easter Sunday, BFBS simulcast a two-hour show with Smooth, presented jointly by Bates and BFBS's Rachel Cochrane, allowing family and friends of serving troops to connect with their loved ones.

=== BFBS Radio stations ===
BFBS currently has three main stations: BFBS the Forces Station (each with regional content), BFBS Radio 2 and BFBS Gurkha Network. In addition, there are themed online stations under the BFBS branding; they are Beats, Rewind, Best of British (replaced Unwind), Edge (formerly Dirt) and Samishran.

BFBS Gurkha Network broadcasts on AM and DAB in selected UK locations as well as on FM in the Falkland Islands, Afghanistan, Brunei, Nepal, Belize and on Ops. It provides programmes in Nepali, for the Gurkha units serving with the British Army.

BFBS broadcast in Malta until 25 March 1979, when British forces left the islands. It ceased broadcasts from Berlin on 15 July 1994, following the end of the Cold War, German reunification, and the withdrawal of British forces from the city, after 33 years. The BFBS Berlin frequency was given up on 12 December 1994. BFBS broadcast in Hong Kong until 30 June 1997, before Chinese People's Liberation Army replaced British forces in the city. BFBS also broadcast on FM in Belize, from Airport Camp near Belize City. These broadcasts could also be received in eastern parts of Guatemala. It ceased broadcasting in Belize in August 2011. The station re-opened in 2016.

Service	Description	Frequency	Webcast
BFBS UK	Contemporary music, speech	DAB+: 11A Sound Digital; FM: 106.8 (Bulford); Sky (UK only): 0136; Freesat: 786	Radioplayer
BFBS Radio 2	Popular music, news, sport		BFBS Radioplayer
BFBS Gurkha Network	Programming for Gurkhas	FM: 90.8 (Dover); FM: 101.5 (Blandford); FM: 105.4 (Folkestone); AM: 1134 kHz (Bramcote, Bulford, Catterick, Sandhurst); AM: 1278 kHz (Folkestone, Stafford, Tidworth); AM: 1287 kHz (Aldershot, Brecon, Hullavington, Innsworth, Maidstone, Warminster)	Radioplayer

==== Local stations ====
Service	Description	Frequency	Webcast
BFBS Ascension Island	Local service	BFBS Radio: FM: 107.3 (Green Mountain); FM: 100.9 (Travellers Hill); BFBS Radio 2: FM: 105.3 (Green Mountain); FM: 97.3 (Travellers Hill)	
BFBS Bahrain	Local service	BFBS Radio: FM: 99.1	
BFBS Belgium	Local service	BFBS Radio: FM: 107.7 (SHAPE)	
BFBS Belize	Local service	BFBS Radio: FM: 94.3; BFBS Radio 2: FM: 96.3; BFBS Gurkha Network: FM: 98.3	
BFBS Bosnia	Local service	BFBS Radio: FM: 102.0 (Butmir Camp); BFBS Radio 2: FM: 106.9 (Butmir Camp)	
BFBS Brunei	Local service	BFBS Radio: FM: 101.7 (Seria); BFBS Gurhka Network: FM: 89.5 (Seria); FM: 92.0 (Sitang Camp)	BFBS Radioplayer
BFBS Canada; CKBF-FM	Local service	BFBS Radio: FM: CKBF-FM 104.1 (Ralston Village / BATUS); FM: 98.1 (CFB Suffield A-Line)	BFBS Radioplayer
BFBS Cyprus	Local service	BFBS Radio: FM: 89.9 (Akrotiri); FM: 91.7 (Ayios Nikolaos); FM: 91.7 (Nicosia); FM: 99.6 (Dhekelia); BFBS Radio 2: FM: 92.1 (Akrotiri); FM: 89.7 (Ayios Nikolaos); FM: 89.7 (Nicosia); FM: 95.3 (Dhekelia)	BFBS Radioplayer
BFBS Estonia	Local service	BFBS Radio: FM: 94.9 (Camp Tapa); BFBS Radio 2: FM: 89.2 (Camp Tapa)	
BFBS Falklands	Local service	BFBS Radio: FM: 102.4 (Byron Heights, Mount Alice, Mount Kent); FM: 98.5 (MPA); FM: 91.1 (Sapper Hill); BFBS Radio 2: FM: 104.2 (Byron Heights, Mount Alice, Mount Kent); FM: 93.8 (MPA); FM: 94.5 (Sapper Hill)	BFBS Radioplayer
BFBS Germany	Local service	BFBS Radio: FM: 91.7 (Friedrichdorf); FM 101.6 (Herford); FM: 96.6 (Porta Westfalica); FM: 105.0 (Sennelager); BFBS Radio 2: FM: 89.6 (Porta Westfalica); FM: 91.2 (Sennelager)	BFBS Radioplayer
BFBS Gibraltar	Local service	BFBS Radio: FM: 97.8 (O'Haras Battery); FM: 93.5 (Oyster Cottage); BFBS Radio 2: FM: 99.5 (O'Haras Battery); FM: 89.4 (Oyster Cottage)	BFBS Radioplayer
BFBS Nepal	Local service	BFBS Gurkha Network: FM: 105.7 (Kathmandu); FM: 107.5 (Dharan Town Area) BFBS Radio 2:	BFBS Radioplayer
BFBS Netherlands	Local service	BFBS Radio: FM: 90.2 (NATO JFC Brunssum)	
BFBS Singapore	Local service	BFBS Radio: Online available (British Defence Singapore Support Unit)	
BFBS Aldershot	Local service	DAB+: SSDAB (Aldershot/Woking); FM: 102.5 MHz	
BFBS Blandford	Local service	FM: 89.3 MHz	
BFBS Brize Norton	Local service	FM: 106.1 MHz	
BFBS Bovington	Local service	FM: 100.8 MHz	
BFBS Bulford	Local service	FM: 106.8 MHz	
BFBS Catterick	Local service	FM: 106.9 MHz	
BFBS Colchester	Local service	FM: 107.0 MHz	
BFBS Northern Ireland	Local service	FM: 106.5 MHz (Aldergrove); FM: 100.6 MHz (Lisburn); FM: 101.0 MHz (Holywood)	Radioplayer
BFBS Salisbury Plain	Local service	DAB+: SSDAB (Salisbury Plain); FM: 106.8 MHz	
BFBS Scotland	Local service	FM: 98.5 MHz (Edinburgh); FM: 87.7 MHz (Inverness & Fort George); FM: 94.0 MHz (Glencorse)	

==== Themed stations ====
Service	Description	Launched	Webcast
BFBS Beats	Rhythmic contemporary		BFBS Radioplayer
BFBS Edge	Rock and indie music	28 March 2022	BFBS Radioplayer
BFBS Rewind	Classic hits		BFBS Radioplayer
BFBS Best of British	British popular music	2022	BFBS Radioplayer
BFBS Samishran	Nepali and Hindi music		BFBS Radioplayer

== BFBS Television ==
BFBS Television started in Celle, near Hanover in West Germany, on 18 September 1975 from Trenchard Barracks. This used taped broadcasts from the BBC and ITV, flown to Germany from London, which were then rebroadcast using low-power UHF transmitters. Live broadcasts of news and sport began in 1982, using a microwave link between the UK and West Germany, extending as far east as West Berlin.

The BFBS TV service used the 625-line PAL system, used in the UK as well as West Germany. By 1982, it was available at 50 sites throughout northern and central regions of West Germany.

It was known as SSVC Television (Services Sound and Vision Corporation) between 1985 and 1997, when it reverted to the BFBS name. Today it broadcasts live via satellite. DVDs are still sent to forces serving in more remote areas. There was also a service known as Navy TV, which broadcast time-shifted versions of the channel to Royal Navy vessels around the world via military satellite.

=== Programmes ===
Most programmes came from BBC, ITV, Channel 4, Channel 5 and Sky, including news from BBC News, Sky News and ITN, and sport from BBC Sport and Sky Sports. BFBS also has its own programmes, including the daily news bulletin programme Daily Forces News.

As of 1982 BFBS's studio—used for BFBS's own shows and six in-vision continuity announcers—was in London Weekend Television (LWT)'s Wembley location. LWT engineers recorded programs for BFBS on videotape, then removed commercials. With only four video recorders available, if two were being used for editing, BBC 1, BBC 2, and ITV could not be recorded simultaneously, so BFBS headquarters in London scheduled the recorders based on advance information, balancing the three channels. That year, it began broadcasting ITN News at 5:45, BBC Nine O'Clock News, and BBC Grandstand live.

=== Availability ===
BFBS Television was broadcast in some areas as a terrestrial service in the clear using low-power transmitters to minimise signal overspill to non-service audiences and protect copyright. Despite this, it could be received in West Berlin, and its listings were carried in local German language magazines. However, the signal was largely confined to the British Sector, reflecting the situation with its American counterpart, AFN TV, whose signal was similarly limited to the American Sector.

Until 1997, it was also widely available in Cyprus, but its signal was encrypted or confined to the Sovereign Base Areas of Akrotiri and Dhekelia. Following complaints from local broadcasters like Lumiere TV, which had bought local rights to show English football and other programming, the decision was made to encrypt the signal, starting with Nicosia in April 1997 and ending with Larnaca and Limassol in May 1998. The decision was criticised by MPs in an Early Day Motion. BFBS ended terrestrial transmissions of its TV channel in Cyprus in January 2009.

However, as a result of card sharing by services personnel, BFBS TV (later BFBS 1) was available to unentitled viewers on the island, along with other channels until 2011, when an illegal pay-TV service was closed down in a joint operation by the Cyprus Police and the Audiovisual Anti-Piracy Alliance.

In the Falkland Islands, SSVC TV was originally only available to entitled viewers in Mount Pleasant, and when a repeater in Sapper Hill was installed by civilians to relay the signal to Stanley in 1988, it was shut down owing to issues related to broadcasting rights for US programming. It was only on Christmas Eve of that year that the service became available to civilian residents. Initially this consisted of prerecorded programmes brought over on cassette from the UK, meaning that they were shown two weeks after the UK, However, in 1997, the channel, by now rebranded as BFBS, was broadcast via satellite, enabling news and sport to be shown on the same day as they had been shown in the UK, but timeshifted by three to four hours to take account of the time difference. This expanded the civilian terrestrial TV service as part of a digital upgrade, which included BFBS 1 and BFBS 2. BFBS 1 and 2 also became available to civilian audiences in Tristan da Cunha.

British Forces and their families stationed at British Army Training Unit Suffield (BATUS), located at Canadian Forces Base Suffield in Canada, had access to BFBS 1, a limited amount of BFBS 2 and BFBS 3 and Sky News on a 7-hour timeshift from CET. During the day, the television channel that BFBS 2/3 broadcast on, played BFBS Radio 1.

=== Content and channels ===
Until 27 March 2013, there were five BFBS Television services:

- BFBS 1 (launched in September 1975; formerly BFBS Television and SSVC Television) – general programming from chat shows to soap operas, dramas to news, documentaries to sport. Relayed the BBC News Channel overnight and was later replaced by BBC One.
- BFBS 2 (launched in 2001) – a six-hour block of general entertainment and sports programmes shown four times around the clock. Replaced by a variation of BBC Two and merged with BFBS 3 Kids.
- BFBS 3 Kids (launched in 2008) – children's programming and factual entertainment.
- BFBS 4 (launched in May 2008) – movie channel with two films a day, each shown six times around the clock.
- BFBS 1 Day Later (launched in 2008) – time-shifted channel which aired programmes from the previous day later at peak time in Afghanistan.

A combined version of the four main channels, called BFBS Navy TV, was available on some naval vessels.

In 2005, BFBS also began distributing commercial networks Kiss TV (previously Q), Sky News, Sky Sports 1 and Sky Sports 2 to certain areas. It also started a movie channel on 2 May 2008, using money that it saved following the Premier League's decision to waive the £250,000 rights fee.

In 2010, BFBS also added Nepali TV (a TV channel in the Nepali language, based in the UK) to its channel line-up for the benefit of Gurkha soldiers. This was replaced by Nepal Television (the state TV broadcaster of Nepal) on 1 March 2016.

==== Service changes ====
SSVC was awarded a new ten-year contract by the Ministry of Defence commencing on 1 April 2013. Fewer overseas troop deployments and reduced budgets resulted in a change to the previous TV service.

Since 27 March 2013, BFBS TV has offered timeshifted versions of BBC One, BBC Two, ITV, as well as two channels of its own. BFBS Extra offers a variety of entertainment programming from U&W (formerly Watch), U&Dave, Sky One, National Geographic Channel, ITV2, 3 and 4, the History Channel, Sky Atlantic and previously Channel 4 and Channel 5. BFBS Sport carries sport from BT Sport (replacing ESPN), Sky Sports, and Eurosport.

BBC Two carries children's programming from CBBC and CBeebies until the late afternoon or early evening, while BFBS Extra 2 carries programming from Pop until the evening. Additionally, the BBC One and ITV feeds are timeshifted to hit peak time in local time zones. Channel 4 and Channel 5 later became available as separate channels in 2019.

==== Forces TV ====
On 10 June 2014, SSVC launched Forces TV, a new channel aimed at the British Armed Forces. It was available on BFBS, Sky channel 181 in the United Kingdom only, Virgin Media channel 274 in the United Kingdom, Freeview channel 96, Freesat channel 165, and on satellite Eutelsat 10A (10°E) alongside BFBS the Forces Station and on Astra2 satellite 28°E free-to-air. Its content was a mixture of news reports, entertainment, documentaries and features produced by BFBS. It was independent from the Ministry of Defence and was funded through advertising and sponsorship. On 30 June 2022, due to the loss of its Freeview channel slot, Forces TV permanently closed down on all platforms at 11:00am.

== BFBS Online ==
In recent years BFBS services have become available online, in order to allow British service personnel stationed all over the world to stay connect no matter how remote. It is available through the BFBS website and App as well as other media platforms such as YouTube. The BFBS online services allow for free access to the BFBS Radio Service, Entertainment and Sports services, BFBS Forces News (Available also via its own website), Documentaries, Podcasts and inter-service sports competition coverage as well as other BFBS services.

== Literature ==
- Alan Grace: This Is the British Forces Network. The Story of Forces Broadcasting in Germany. Stroud (1996) ISBN 0-7509-1105-0
- Alan Grace: The Link With Home. 60 Years of Forces Radio. Chalfont (2003) ISBN 0-9522135-1-6
- Doreen Taylor: A Microphone and a Frequency. Forty Years of Forces Broadcasting. London (1983) ISBN 0-434-75710-1 and ISBN 0-434-75711-X
- Oliver Zöllner: BFBS: 'Freund in der Fremde'. British Forces Broadcasting Service (Germany) – der britische Militärrundfunk in Deutschland. Göttingen (1996) [in German] ISBN 3-89588-632-7.
- Oliver Zöllner: "Forces Broadcasting: A 'Friend' Abroad", in Communications, Vol. 21 (1996), issue 4, pp. 447–466 ISSN 0341-2059.
- Peter McDonagh: Me and Thirteen Tanks: Tales of a Cold War Freelance Spy. London (2014) ISBN 978-1500307370.
- Ivor Wynne Jones: BFBS Cyprus: 1948–1998. (1998) ISBN 978-0950335933.

== See also ==
- American Forces Network
- Canadian Forces Radio and Television
- Radio forces françaises de Berlin
- Radio Wolga
- BBC Allied Expeditionary Forces Programme
- BBC Forces Programme
- BBC General Forces Programme
