= Bunty Gunn =

British television presenter (born 1933)

- Born: Bunty James; 1933 (age 92–93); Maryport, Cumberland, England
- Occupation: television presenter
- Known for: How

Bunty Gunn (née James; born 1933, Maryport, Cumberland, England) is a former British television presenter who is best known for her appearances on the educational children's television science programme How in the 1960s and 1970s with Jack Hargreaves, Jon Miller and Fred Dinenage.

== Career ==
Gunn attended Cheltenham Ladies College and was a radio announcer, before moving on to present a programme on Southern Television entitled Day by Day. After appearing on How from 1966–1967 and from 1970–1976 she appeared in the 1991 television film The Happening and moved to Caithness, Scotland.

In November 2018, at the age of 85, she published her first book, a detective novel called See You Around.
