= Jok =

Jok or JOK may refer to:

== People ==
- Jeremiah Owusu-Koramoah (born 1999), American football linebacker
- Jok Church (1949–2016), American cartoonist
- Johnny O'Keefe (1935–1978), Australian singer
- John Luk Jok (1951-2020), South Sudanese politician
- Stan Jok (1926–1972), American professional baseball player

== Other uses ==
- Jok (spirit), a class of entities within the traditional Acholi belief system
- Jok, Thai version of the Chinese rice dish congee
- Yoshkar-Ola Airport, in Mari El Republic, Russia

== See also ==
- Just One Kiss (disambiguation)
