= Johnny Edward =

British musical artist (1945–2021)

- Also known as: John "Purpleknees" Edward
- Born: John Edward Flux; 31 October 1945; Gillingham, Kent, England
- Died: 23 October 2021 (aged 75)
- Occupations: Musician; songwriter; record producer; TV screenwriter; radio personality; agency founder; character creator of Metal Mickey
- Instruments: Guitar
- Label: Parlophone Records

John Edward Flux (31 October 1945 – 23 October 2021), professionally known as Johnny Edward, was a British musician, writer and record producer, also known as the creator of the children's television character Metal Mickey.

== Career ==
=== Musician ===
He was born in Gillingham, Kent, England. As a guitarist, Flux joined the R&B group The Manish Boys, whose lead singer became David Jones, later known as David Bowie. Billed as John "Purpleknees" Edward, in March 1965 Parlophone Records released "I Pity The Fool", a cover version of a Bobby Bland song. With Bowie focused on numerous projects, and the single unsuccessful, the group broke up.

=== Pirate DJ ===
Flux and saxophonist Woolf Byrne joined pirate radio station Radio City. Based at Shivering Sands Army Fort, his theme tune was The Shadows tune "Sweet Dreams". After successfully applying for a position at Wonderful Radio London, he agreed with the programme director Ben Toney to start in November 1965, billed as John Edward – his Christian names. Never having a regular slot, he stayed with the station until July 1966.

=== Instant Sound ===
During the late 1960s / early 1970s, he ran The John Edward Entertainment Agency with his wife Sue and booked such bands as Heatwave with; John Fellows {bass/vocals}, Terry Shea {guitar/vocals}, Richard Steen {lead guitar/vocals}, Martin Samuel {drums/pyrotechnics} and Peter Allatt {lead vocals/percussion}. John wrote and produced the Heatwave single, 'Sister Simon (Funny Man)' b/w 'Rastus Ravel (Is A Mean Old Man)' (PEN 738) released on Larry Page's Penny Farthing Records label for his company, Instant Sound Productions. The single featured Rick Wakeman on keyboards and Doris Troy with Maggie Stredder, Gloria George and Marian Davis, The Ladybirds, as back-up singers. Both sides of the record were aired on Radio Seagull by Paul Stiles on his 01/25/2012 Midweek Madness show.

=== Hollywood Records ===
Returning to the music business, he set up independent label Hollywood Records as a vehicle through which to write and produce his own songs via a series of unattached artistes. Being a rock and roll man, Edward hated the soft-kitsch style of production at that time in the early 1970s, and wrote the kitsch-Italian Save Your Love stating that "the song was written as a joke, to give the finger to Save Your Kisses For Me by Brotherhood of Man among other tracks that made me chew the carpet".

In 1975, he heard West Midlands-resident Italian waiter Renato Pagliari audition for ITV's talent show New Faces. Teaming Pagliari with British-born female singer Hilary Lester, Edward renamed them Renée and Renato to record the song. "Save Your Love" entered the UK Singles Chart in October 1982 at number 54. However, it began to pick up sales during the Christmas period, and seven weeks after its debut was at the top of the chart, resulting in it being played on Top of the Pops and many radio stations. Lester, whom by now Edward had placed in another Hollywood Records band, did not appear in the video, replaced by a more-Italianate looking model. "Save Your Love" was a UK Number one hit single, remaining at the top of the chart for four weeks before being knocked off by Phil Collins' "You Can't Hurry Love". It was the first song produced by an independent record label to ever reach the UK Number one position. The Edwards written contractually enforced follow-ups, "Just One More Kiss" stalled at Number 48, and "Jesus Loves Us All" did not chart, breaking the duo up.

Edward recorded a special Radio London Fab 40 countdown at Christmas 2005.

=== Metal Mickey ===
Edward created the 1960s inspired robot Metal Mickey. Voiced by Edwards with a catchphrase of "boogie, boogie, boogie", his favourite treat was Atomic Thunderbusters, which had the appearance of lemon bonbons. First shown on the Southern Television produced The Saturday Banana in 1978, friend and former The Monkees drummer Micky Dolenz picked up the rights to produce and then direct the first episodes of The Metal Mickey TV Show. Set in a family-home environment with the grandmother played by Irene Handl, the show had a peak ITV Saturday teatime viewing figure of 12 million people, and ran for three series from 1980 to 1983.

=== Death ===
Edward was working on relaunching Metal Mickey to new audiences, with his former voicing/operator role taken over by Liverpudlian actor Lee Jackson, supported by his on-screen wife Yvonne Delahaye.

Edward died on 23 October 2021 at age 75.
