= Timeline of Southern Television =

This is a timeline of the history of the former British broadcaster Southern Television. It provided the ITV service for the South and South East of England from 1958 to 1981.

== 1950s ==
- 1958
  - 30 August – At 5:30pm, Southern Television begins broadcasting.
- 1959
  - No events.

== 1960s ==
- 1960
  - 31 January – Southern Television's broadcast area expands when it begins broadcasting to Kent and East Sussex, following the Independent Television Authority granting Southern the right to broadcast to South East England.
  - Southern makes minor changes to the visual look of its on-screen logo. The stylised star is banished and is replaced by a more compass-like star symbol.
- 1961
  - Southern opens studios in Dover and launches localised news opt-outs for the east of the region, becoming the first broadcaster in the UK to provide such a service.
  - 4 April – Southern launches a weeknight 30-minute regional news programme called Day By Day.
- 1962
  - No events.
- 1963
  - No events.
- 1964
  - 9 October – Southern launches a weekly news magazine called Friday on Ten. This is shown instead of the Friday edition of regional news magazine Day by Day.
  - Southern is given a three-year extension to its licence. This is later extended by a further year.
- 1965
  - No events.
- 1966
  - Southern Television Limited renames itself Southern Independent Television Limited as part of the 1968 ITV franchise round.
- 1967
  - Southern begins construction of its new studio complex, to be called Television Centre, Southampton.
  - The Independent Television Authority renews Southern's licence for a further seven years.
- 1968
  - August – A technicians strike forces ITV off the air for several weeks although management manage to launch a temporary ITV Emergency National Service with no regional variations.
- 1969
  - 19 August – Southern moves into its new purpose-built studios.
  - 13 December – Southern starts broadcasting in colour but does not mark the change with any alteration to its logo other than replacing the black background with a blue one.

== 1970s ==
- 1970
  - No events.
- 1971
  - No events.
- 1972
  - 16 October – Following a law change which removed all restrictions on broadcasting hours, ITV is able to launch an afternoon service.
- 1973
  - No events.
- 1974
  - The 1974 franchise round sees no changes in ITV's contractors as it is felt that the huge cost in switching to colour television would have made the companies unable to compete against rivals in a franchise battle.
- 1975
  - No events.
- 1976
  - No events.
- 1977
  - Due to the popularity of weekly magazine programme Scene South East, Southern launches Scene Midweek. This replaces part two of the Wednesday edition of Day by Day.
  - 26 November – At around 5:10pm, the Southern Television broadcast interruption takes place. The disruption, which occurs at the Hannington transmitter, is in sound only and lasts for six minutes.
- 1978
  - No events.
- 1979
  - 10 August – The ten week ITV strike forces Southern Television off the air. The strike ends on 24 October.

== 1980s ==
- 1980
  - 28 December – The Independent Broadcasting Authority announces that Southern has lost its franchise to TVS.
- 1981
  - August – Southern sells its Southampton studios to TVS but Southern continues to use them until its franchise runs out at the end of the year.
- 1982
  - 1 January – Southern Television closes down for the final time at 12:43am.
- After 1982
  - 1983 – TVS closes Southern's Dover studios following the opening of its new studios at Maidstone.
  - 1984 – Southern's Dover studios are demolished.
  - Southern's programme archive is sold to Southern Star Group, who later sell it on to Renown Pictures.

== See also ==
- History of ITV
- History of ITV television idents
- Timeline of ITV
- Timeline of TVS – Southern's successor
