= Jon Miller (TV presenter) =

British television presenter (1921–2008)

- Born: 14 July 1921; Southend-on-Sea, Essex, England
- Died: 30 July 2008 (aged 87); Helston, Cornwall, England
- Occupation: Television presenter
- Known for: How

Jon Miller (born John Miller, 14 July 1921 – 30 July 2008) was a British television presenter who was best known for his appearances on the educational children's television science programme How between 1966 and 1981 with Jack Hargreaves, Bunty James and Fred Dinenage.

== Early life ==
Miller was born in Southend-on-Sea, Essex in 1921. His mother, Edie, was a concert pianist, his father, Jack, was a shopkeeper and Yehudi Menuhin, the violinist, was a cousin. Miller's upbringing on the English South coast began a life-long interest in marine life.

== Career ==
Miller attended Bedales School and studied photography at the Reimann School in London between 1939 and 1941. In World War II he served in the RAF as an aerial photographer. In 1947 he volunteered for reconstruction work on the Yugoslav Youth Railway. He then worked for his father's retail business, and travelled abroad extensively as a specimen collector for the Zoological Society of London.

His television career as a naturalist began with the show Animal Magic, and progressed to working on Southern Television. In the early 1960s, while living in Middleton-on-Sea in Sussex, Miller was spotted by Jack Hargreaves, then Deputy Programme Controller at Southern, who recruited him to appear on How. Miller's demonstrations of chemistry experiments became a major feature of the show. His fellow presenter Dinenage recalled, "He lived his life for explosions. He was never happier than when he was creating a big bang and those were the days before the health-and-safety police."

Miller moved to Cornwall in 1969, and lived there after retirement. He appeared regularly on Westward Television. In his retirement Miller was a frequent letter-writer to newspapers and magazines.

== Personal life ==
Miller was married to Rita Hallerman in 1947 and they had one son and two daughters. The marriage was dissolved and in 1965 he married again, to Cecily Power, with whom he had two more daughters. He died in Helston, Cornwall on 30 July 2008.

== Books ==
A Fellow of the Zoological Society of London, Miller wrote a number of books:

- Of Fish and Men. Jarrolds. 1958.
- Mountains in the Sea. Vantage Press. 1972. ISBN 0533002125.
- How to Keep Unusual Pets. Studio Vista. 1975. ISBN 028970510X.
- How to Fool Your Brain. Littlehampton Book Services. 1975. ISBN 0289706106.
