= Save Your Love (Renée and Renato song) =

1982 song

Single by Renée and Renato

from the album Just One...
- B-side: "If Love Is Not the Reason"
- Released: October 1982
- Genre: Pop
- Length: 3:06
- Label: Hollywood Records
- Songwriters: Johnny Edward; Sue Edward
- Producer: Johnny Edward

Renée and Renato singles chronology
"Save Your Love" (1982)	"Just One More Kiss" (1983)

"Save Your Love" is a song which, when performed by duo Renée and Renato, was a UK number-one hit in December 1982. It remained at the top of the chart for four weeks before being overtaken by Phil Collins' cover of "You Can't Hurry Love". The song was written by Johnny Edward (creator and voice of fictional robot TV character Metal Mickey) and his wife Sue. Edward also produced the song and released it on his own label, Hollywood Records.

"Save Your Love" entered the UK Singles Chart on 13 November 1982 at number 38. However, it began to pick up sales during the Christmas period, and six weeks after its debut was at the top of the charts, resulting in it being played on Top of the Pops and many radio stations. It was the first ever completely indie number one, and it sold some 980,000 copies. Renée (whose real name was Hilary Lester), did not appear in the video for "Save Your Love"; instead, she was replaced by a model named Vivienne Marshall (née Penny).

== Chart performance ==
=== Weekly charts ===
Chart (1982–1983)	Peak position
Australia (Kent Music Report]	3
Austria (Ö3 Austria Top 40)	17
Belgium (Ultratop 50 Flanders)	1
Denmark (Hitlisten)	2
Finland (Suomen virallinen lista)	12
Germany (GfK)	10
Ireland (IRMA)	1
Israel (IBA)	1
Netherlands (Dutch Top 40)	1
Netherlands (Single Top 100)	2
New Zealand (Recorded Music NZ)	33
Norway (VG-lista)	1
Spain (AFYVE)	7
Sweden (Sverigetopplistan)	3
Switzerland (Schweizer Hitparade)	4
UK Singles (OCC)	1

=== Year-end charts ===
Chart (1982)	Position
UK Singles	12

Chart (1983)	Position
Australia (Kent Music Report)	7
Belgium (Ultratop Flanders)	12
Germany (GfK Entertainment)	61
Netherlands (Dutch Top 40)	52
Netherlands (Single Top 100)	43

== Certifications ==
Region	Certification	Certified units/sales
Canada (Music Canada)	Gold	50,000^{^}
United Kingdom (BPI)	Gold	500,000^{^}
^{^} Shipments figures based on certification alone.

== Critical reception ==
"Save Your Love" was ranked at Number 5 on a Daily Telegraph list of the "Worst Christmas number ones of all time".

== Cover version ==
A Dutch version with the title "Niemand laat zijn eigen kind alleen" ("No one leaves their own child alone") was recorded by Willy Alberti with his daughter Willeke. This version reached Number 4 in the Dutch charts in 1982.
