= Anne Dawson =

Anne Dawson may refer to:

- Anne Dawson (broadcaster), English academic and former broadcast journalist
- Anne Dawson (secret agent) (1896–1989), British spy in occupied Belgium in WW1

== See also ==
- Anna Dawson (born 1937), English actress and singer
- Anne Dawson Hedeman (born 1952/1953), American bibliographer and medievalist
- Anne Lagacé Dowson, Canadian radio journalist
