= Coast to Coast (British TV programme) =

- Genre: News, South and South East England (regional)
- Presented by: South: Khalid Aziz; Fred Dinenage; Christopher Peacock; Fern Britton; Debbie Thrower; South East: Vyvyan Mackeson; Mike Fuller; Mike Debens; Anna Maria Ashe; Liz Wickham
- Country of origin: England

Production
- Running time: Main bulletin: 30 minutes Other bulletins: Times vary
- Production company: TVS

Original release
- Release: 1 January 1982 – 31 December 1992

Related
- ITV News Meridian

Coast to Coast was the flagship regional news programme produced by TVS, covering the south and southeast of England with separate news services for both parts of the dual-region between 1 January 1982 and 31 December 1992.

== History ==
=== Beginnings ===
Coast to Coast was launched in January 1982 as TVS's nightly regional news magazine with two distinct editions for both the South and the South East. Previously, TVS's predecessors Southern Television had produced Day by Day for over 20 years alongside separate news bulletins for both sub-regions and Scene South East, a weekly magazine programme for the South East (supplemented in later years by Scene Midweek).

The first edition of Coast to Coast was broadcast on New Year's Day 1982 at 9:25 am with a pan-regional special entitled Bring in the New (TVS's first programme), introducing the new station and featuring TVS's first news bulletins. The first sub-regional editions of the programme were aired at 5:15 pm on the same evening – reportedly watched by nearly a million viewers.

Originally, the programme aired between 5:30 pm & 6:30 pm, consisting of two sub-regional segments at 5:30 pm & 6:20 pm, ITN's News at 545 bulletin and a pan-regional segment at 6:00 pm. Within several months of launch, the main evening edition was cut to 30 minutes at 6 pm and became a fully separate programme. Former ITN reporter and newsreader Robert Southgate was the first head of news and current affairs for TVS.

The programme also spawned a spin-off lunchtime chat show entitled Coast to Coast People, broadcast as two separate programmes for the South and South East. For one week in November 1989, TVS also piloted a 30-minute late night edition of the programme entitled Coast to Coast Late.

=== Production notes ===
The launch of the expanded news service for the two-halves of the region led to TVS increasing its news staff from 37 to 94 with the company investing in computer facilities for its newsrooms.

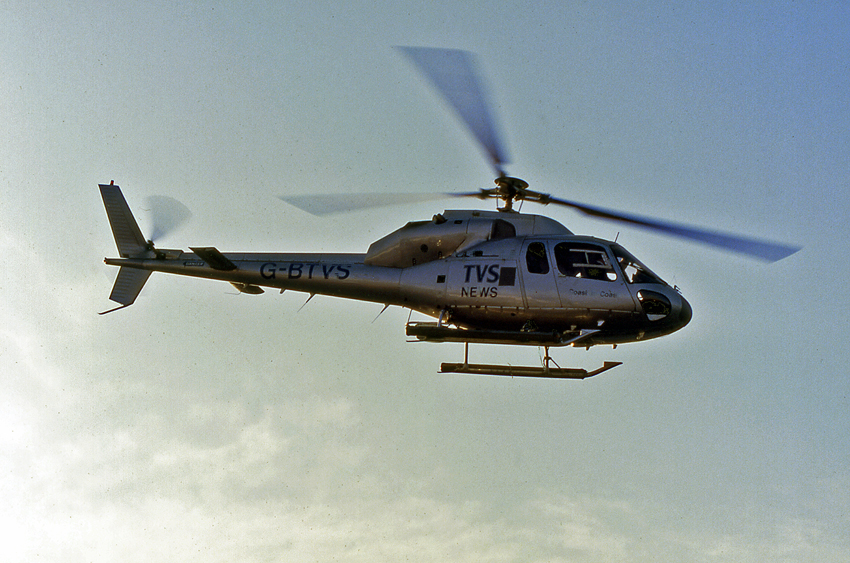
TVS News radio link helicopter

TVS was also the first television station in Britain to have its own dedicated live-link news helicopter – an Aerospatiale Twin Squirrel equipped with remote control camera and facilities to receive live pictures beamed up to it from five Land Rover Discovery mobile up-link units. This system was brought into use in 1990 and relayed live news coverage from anywhere in the South and South East to reception dishes located on the region's main transmitter masts.

Both the South and the South East editions of Coast to Coast also utilised a newsroom at the QE2 Conference Centre in London – particularly for parliamentary coverage.

=== Sub-regional editions ===
==== South ====
The South edition of Coast to Coast was produced and broadcast from TVS's main studios in Southampton with district newsrooms latterly opened in Reading (covering the Thames Valley) and Poole (covering Dorset).

From 12 December 1988 to 31 December 1992, an opt-out for viewers served by the Hannington transmitter was broadcast during the main 6pm programme – produced from TVS's Reading newsroom and broadcast from a small continuity studio in Southampton.

The programme was originally presented by Khalid Aziz and utilised many former Southern Television staff including sports presenter Fred Dinenage and weatherman Trevor Baker. Dinenage was promoted to become main anchor when Aziz left Coast to Coast a year later to concentrate on business programming for TVS.

After a period presenting alongside Christopher Peacock, Dinenage was joined by Fern Britton in 1985 – a partnership which continued for much of the programme's run until Britton's departure shortly before TVS went off air in December 1992.

Other presenters for the South edition included newsreaders James Montgomery, John Doyle, Debbie Thrower, Jane Wyatt, Keith Akehurst, Mai Davies and Debbie Middleton, sports presenters David Bobin and Gareth Evans and weather presenters Anne Purvis and Carl Tyler.

In November 1986 the IBA raised specific criticisms about the content of the programme, which led to a new editor being appointed to help resolve the issues. Coast to Coast South went on to win the Royal Television Society's Best News Programme of the Year award twice – in 1989 and 1991.

==== South East ====
The South East edition of Coast to Coast was produced and broadcast originally from a small studio in Dover previously used by Southern Television and, by October 1982, from the purpose-built TVS Television Centre in Maidstone – a district newsroom was located in Brighton to cover East Sussex.

An ultra-local opt-out for viewers in Brighton and the surrounding areas was later developed, produced from the Brighton newsroom, but broadcast from a small continuity studio in Maidstone.

Originally presented by Vyvyan Mackeson, the programme's launch team also included a number of former Southern TV presenters and reporters including sports presenter Mike Field (who presented the programme's predecessor, Scene South East), Mike Fuller, Arnie Wilson and weatherman Ron Lobeck.

Mackeson left Coast to Coast after several months and was replaced by former BBC News reporter Mike Debens as main anchor. Debens went on to become the programme's longest serving main presenter, partnered on-screen by a number of co-anchors including Merrill Harries, Mike Fuller, Cheryl Armitage, Anna Maria Ashe and Liz Wickham.

Other key reporters and presenters on the Coast to Coast team in the South East included Cathy Alexander, Jackie Bird, Paul Davies, Anne Dawson and Kerry Swain.

The Maidstone news team covered a number of major news stories during the programme's 11 years on air including the sinking of the Herald of Free Enterprise, the construction of the Channel Tunnel, the IRA bombings of the Brighton Grand Hotel and the Royal Marines base in Deal, and the Great Storm of 1987. The programme won the Royal Television Society Award for Britain's best regional news programme in 1983.

=== The End of Coast to Coast ===
On 16 October 1991, Television South learned it was to lose its ITV regional franchise for the South and South East of England to Meridian Broadcasting, signalling the end for Coast to Coast.

The final editions of the programme were aired as an hour-long special on 31 December 1992. In the South, Fred Dinenage and Mai Davies presented a regular edition featuring the last part of a feature series looking back at the past 11 years of news coverage provided by TVS. Meanwhile, in the South East, Mike Debens and Liz Wickham presented a more retrospective programme featuring an invited studio audience.

The last South edition closed with a montage of presenters and reporters while the last South East edition closed with a live performance of the programme's signature tune by the Band of the Royal Marines in Deal, Kent.

=== Presenters ===
Main presenters history
Years	Presenter No. 1	Presenter No. 2	Programme
1982–1983	Khalid Aziz	none	Coast to Coast South edition
1983–1985	Fred Dinenage	Christopher Peacock	Coast to Coast South edition
1985–1988	Fred Dinenage	Fern Britton	Coast to Coast South edition
1988–1990	Fred Dinenage	Debbie Thrower	Coast to Coast South edition
1990– December 1992	Fred Dinenage	Fern Britton	Coast to Coast South edition
December 1992	Fred Dinenage	Mai Davies	Coast to Coast South edition
1982	Vyvyan Mackeson	Mike Fuller	Coast To Coast South East edition
1982–1989	Mike Debens	Merrill Harries/Mike Fuller/Cheryl Armitage/Anna Maria Ashe	Coast To Coast South East edition
1989–1992	Mike Debens	Liz Wickham	Coast To Coast South East edition
