= How (TV series) =

British children's educational TV series (1966–1981)

- Also known as: How 2 (1990–2006); HOW (2020–2022)
- Genre: Educational
- Created by: Jack Hargreaves
- Directed by: George Egan; Angus Wright; Anthony Howard; Chris McMaster
- Presented by: Fred Dinenage (1966–2022); Bunty James (1966–1967, 1970–1976); Jon Miller (1966–1981); Jack Hargreaves (1966–1981); Tom Gaskell (1967–1968); Jill Graham (1967–1969); Marian Davies (1977–1981); Gareth Jones (1990–2006); Carol Vorderman (1990–1997); Siân Lloyd (1997); Gail Porter (1999); Gail McKenna (2000–2006); Vick Hope (2020–2022); Sam Homewood (2020–2022); Frankie Vu (2020–2022)
- Country of origin: United Kingdom
- Original language: English
- No. of seasons: 17 (original); 15 (How 2); 2 (revival); 34 (total)
- No. of episodes: 273 (original); 198 (How 2); 20 (revival); 486 (total)

Production
- Producers: Stephen Wade; Kevin Goldstein-Jackson; Angus Wright
- Production locations: Southampton Studios (1966–1981, 1991–1992); Maidstone Studios (1990, 2020); Glasgow Studios (1993–2006); The Bottle Yard Studios (2022)
- Running time: 30 minutes (inc. adverts)
- Production companies: Southern Television (1966–1981); Television South (TVS) (1990–1992); STV (1993–2006); Lion TV (2004–2006); Terrific Television (2020–2022)

Original release
- Network: ITV/CITV
- Release: 22 March 1966 – 19 August 1981
- Release: 21 September 1990 – 1 September 2006
- Release: 15 November 2020 – 6 May 2022

How (usually stylised as HOW) is a British educational television programme created by Jack Hargreaves. It was produced from 1966 by Southern Television, for which Hargreaves was a presenter and deputy programme controller. It lasted until 1981, when the company lost its franchise to TVS.

== History ==
How was originally devised by Hargreaves for an audience of adults returning home from the pub. Its aim would be to give facts and demonstrations that could settle arguments or be used as pub tricks. A one-off pilot was broadcast at 11.15 pm on 22 March 1966, to viewers in the Southern Television area only.

Following the pilot, Hargreaves felt the show might work better in an afternoon slot, aimed at making facts fun for children. At 5.25 pm on Monday 11 April 1966, Southern broadcast the first programme in the series of How, which would continue in a similar format for the next 15 years. Produced in Southern's Southampton studios, it provided answers to questions beginning with the word "How". Each episode began with the presenters all raising one hand and saying "How" simultaneously (mimicking the stereotypical Native American greeting). Topics commonly covered included science, history, mathematics, and simple puzzles. The formula proved so successful that it was soon broadcast by the whole ITV network and given two slots per week.

The show was originally presented by Hargreaves alone. He was joined by Fred Dinenage (1966–1981), Jon Miller (1966–1981), Bunty James (1966–1967 and 1970–1976), Dr. Tom Gaskell (1967–1968), Jill Graham (1967–1969) and Marian Davies (1977–1981). Occasional stand-ins for Hargreaves included Barry Bucknell and James Kelway.

The series came to an end in 1981 when Southern Television lost its ITV franchise. The majority of episodes no longer exist.

== Revival ==
In 1990, the series was revived as How 2 by TVS. Presenter Fred Dinenage returned, accompanied by Gareth Jones, Carol Vorderman, Siân Lloyd, Gail Porter and Gail McKenna. This show aired on Children's ITV (known as CITV) and ran for 16 years, until 2006.

In 2019, How 2 was made available on Amazon Prime Video in the UK.

Also in 2019, the CITV channel commissioned a further revival of the format. This was due to air in November 2020, with Fred Dinenage making his second return to the series franchise, alongside a new team of Vick Hope, Sam Homewood and Frankie Vu.

== Transmission guide ==
=== Original How (1966–1981) ===
- Pilot: Playback - How 22 March 1966
- Series 1 (Southern region): 25 editions from 11 Apr 1966–26 Sept 1966; (networked) 26 editions from 5 January 1967 – 29 June 1967
- Series 2: 27 editions from 28 September 1967 – 27 March 1968
- Series 3: 29 editions from 18 November 1968 – 23 June 1969
- Series 4: 12 editions from 16 January 1970 – 3 April 1970
- Series 5: 7 editions from 9 July 1970 – 20 August 1970
- Series 6: 15 editions from 8 July 1971 – 26 August 1971
- Series 7: 10 editions from 22 June 1972 – 24 August 1972
- Series 8: 10 editions from 24 April 1973 – 26 June 1973
- Series 9: 10 editions from 23 April 1974 – 25 June 1974
- Special: A Special Christmas How: 18 December 1974
- Series 10: 7 editions from 8 January 1975 – 19 February 1975
- Series 11: 11 editions 22 April 1975 – 1 July 1975
- Series 12: 13 editions from 31 December 1975 – 24 March 1976
- Series 13: 13 editions from 5 January 1977 – 30 March 1977
- Series 14: 13 editions from 1 March 1978 – 24 May 1978
- Series 15: 13 editions from 3 January 1979 – 28 March 1979
- Series 16: 13 editions from 25 June 1980 – 24 September 1980
- Series 17: 13 editions from 13 May 1981 – 19 August 1981

=== How 2 (1990–2006) ===
- Series 18: 10 editions from 21 September – 23 November 1990
- Series 19: 10 editions from 23 September – 25 November 1991
- Series 20: 10 editions from 7 September – 9 November 1992
- Series 21: 15 editions from 6 September – 13 December 1993
- Series 22: 15 editions from 5 September – 12 December 1994
- Series 23: 14 editions from 4 September – 11 December 1995
- Series 24: 15 editions from 9 September – 16 December 1996
- Special: Comedy How: 21 February 1997
- Series 25: 16 editions from 1 September – 15 December 1997
- Series 26: 13 editions from 5 January – 6 April 1999
- Series 27: 13 editions from 10 January – 11 April 2000
- Series 28: 20 editions from 22 January – 16 February 2001
- Series 29: 10 editions from 11 – 22 February 2002
- Series 30: 10 editions from 10 January – 14 March 2003
- Series 31: 13 editions from 4 June – 27 August 2004
- Series 32: 13 editions from 5 May – 1 September 2006

=== HOW (revival) (2020–2022) ===
- Series 33: 10 editions from 15 November – 25 December 2020
- Series 34: 10 editions from 25 April – 6 May 2022
