= List of Top Pops number-one singles =

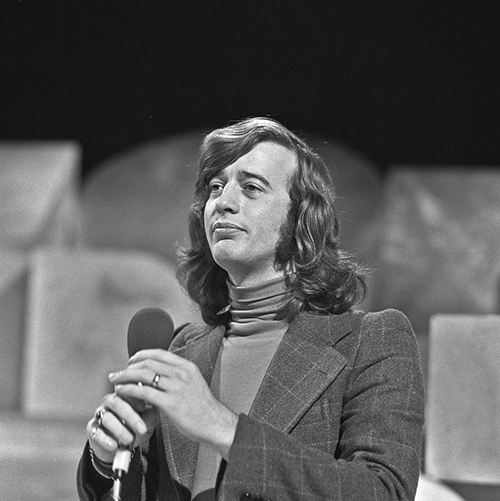
Robin Gibb reached number one on the Top Pops chart in 1969 with his song "Saved by the Bell", but the song did not top the BMRB chart and is therefore not regarded as an official UK number one.

Top Pops is a former British weekly pop music newspaper. It was founded as a monthly publication by Woodrow Wyatt in May 1967, becoming fortnightly in November 1967. On 25 May 1968, editor Colin Bostock-Smith began compiling a singles sales chart using a telephone sample of approximately twelve W H Smith & Son stores – the first single to reach number one on the Top Pops chart was "Young Girl" by Gary Puckett & The Union Gap. The charts and paper were published weekly with effect from 22 June 1968. On 20 September 1969 the paper was rebranded Top Pops & Music Now, and subsequently became Music Now from 21 March 1970 – at this point the chart was sampling between 30 and 40 stores. From 27 February 1971 the chart was no longer published and in May 1971 the newspaper ceased publication. During the publication of the chart, 55 different singles reached number one. The only one to be knocked off number one and then regain the top spot was "Mony Mony" by Tommy James and the Shondells. The final chart-topper was "My Sweet Lord" by George Harrison.

From the advent of charts in the UK until 1969 several magazines and newspapers published their own charts, and there was no one "official" singles chart. In February 1969, however, Record Retailer and the BBC jointly commissioned the British Market Research Bureau (BMRB) to compile an official chart. The Record Retailer chart is now considered by the Official Charts Company, the current compilers of the UK Singles Chart, to be the canonical source for number-one singles for the earlier part of the 1960s. Charts compiled by Top Pops had fifteen number-one singles that did not reach the top spot in the Record Retailer chart; in comparison, a total of nine Top Pops number-ones did not top the rival New Musical Express chart. Seven Top Pops number ones did not top either of the other publications' charts. Edwin Hawkins Singers' "Oh Happy Day", Robin Gibb's "Saved by the Bell", Bee Gees' "Don't Forget to Remember", and The Tremeloes' "(Call Me) Number One" all peaked at number two in both charts, Herman's Hermits' "My Sentimental Friend" and Don Fardon's "Indian Reservation" placed with one number two and one number three in each chart, and Stevie Wonder's "My Cherie Amour" reached fourth and third spot in the two charts. Fardon's "Indian Reservation," however, also made number one on the Melody Maker chart, so if that publication's number ones are factored in, Top Pops / Music Now's unique number ones total the six from 1969.

== Number-one singles ==
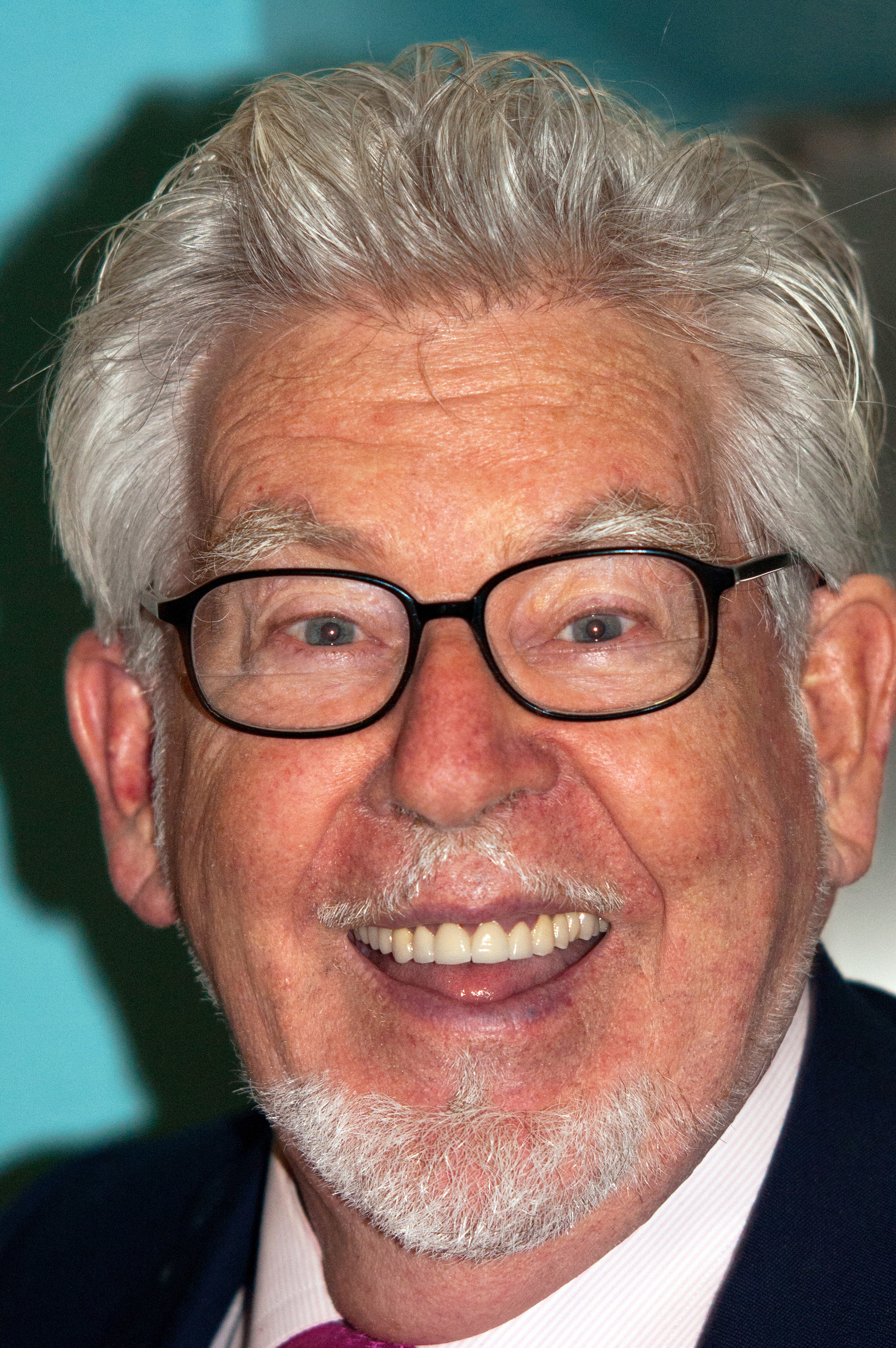
Australian entertainer Rolf Harris (pictured in 2010) spent six weeks at number one in Top Pops with the song "Two Little Boys", the longest run atop the chart.

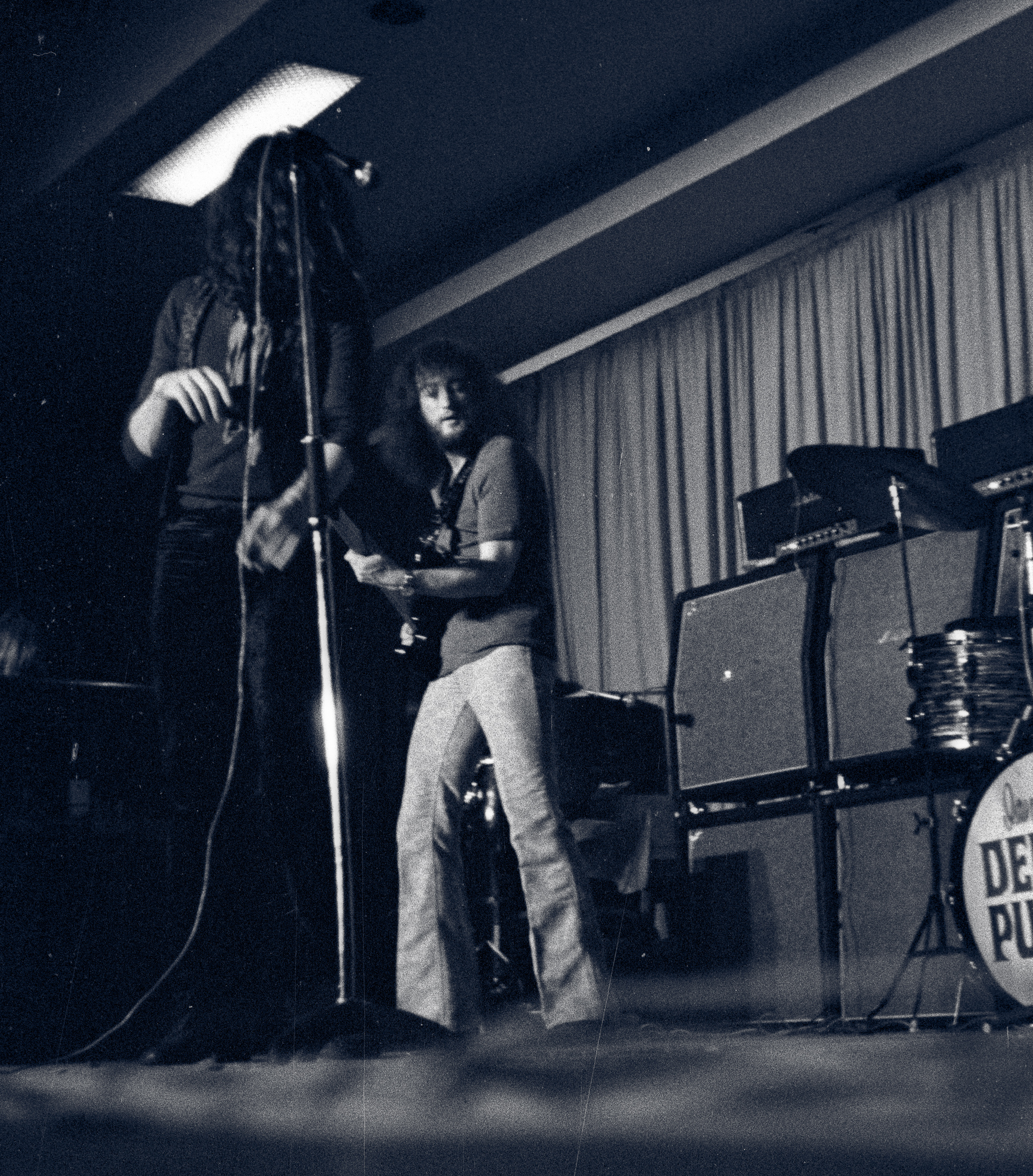
Hard rock band Deep Purple reached number one on the Top Pops chart with "Black Night", but have never achieved an officially-recognised UK number one hit.

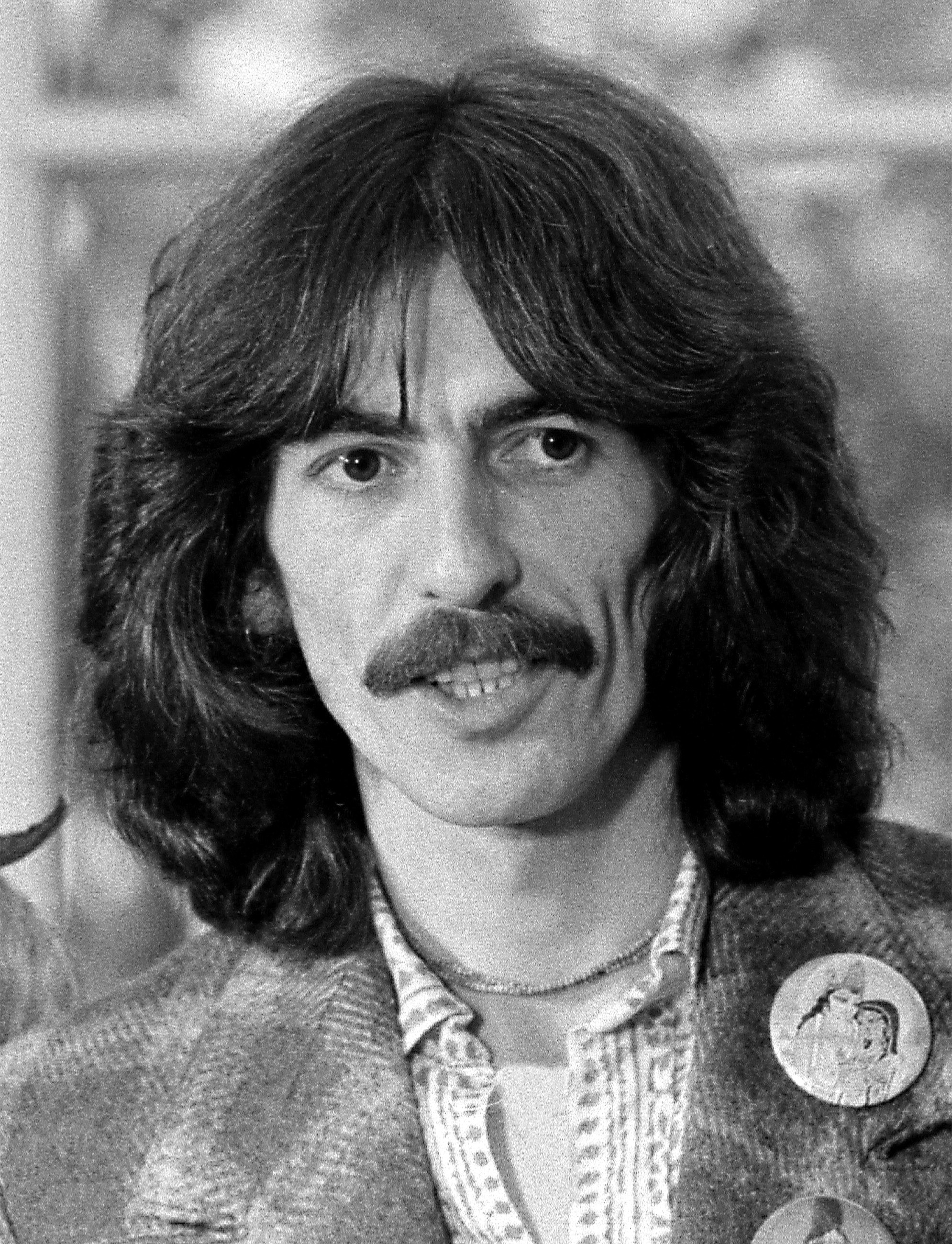
George Harrison was at number one with "My Sweet Lord" when the chart ceased publication in 1971.

Key
No.	nth single to top the chart
re	Return of a single to number one
‡	The song did not reach number one on the chart that is now considered official by the Official Charts Company.

List of Top Pops number-one singles
No.	Artist (Note: The names, singles, week-ending dates and duration at number one are from Top Pops (later Music Now).)	Single	Reached number one	Weeks at number one
1968
1	Gary Puckett & The Union Gap	"Young Girl"	25 May 1968	4 (Note: The chart was published fortnightly at this time, so "Young Girl", which topped two fortnightly charts, spent four weeks at number one.)
2	The Rolling Stones	"Jumpin' Jack Flash"	22 June 1968	3
3	The Equals	"Baby Come Back"	13 July 1968	2
4	Tommy James and the Shondells	"Mony Mony"	27 July 1968	2
5	Crazy World of Arthur Brown	"Fire"	10 August 1968	1
re	Tommy James and the Shondells	"Mony Mony"	17 August 1968	2
6	Bee Gees	"I've Gotta Get a Message to You"	31 August 1968	1
7	The Beatles	"Hey Jude"	7 September 1968	4
8	Mary Hopkin	"Those Were the Days"	5 October 1968	5
9	Joe Cocker	"With a Little Help from My Friends"	9 November 1968	2
10	Hugo Montenegro	"The Good, the Bad and the Ugly"	23 November 1968	2
11	The Scaffold	"Lily the Pink"	7 December 1968	5
1969
12	Marmalade	"Ob-La-Di, Ob-La-Da"	11 January 1969	2
13	Fleetwood Mac	"Albatross"	25 January 1969	4
14	Amen Corner	"(If Paradise) Is Half as Nice"	22 February 1969	2
15	Peter Sarstedt	"Where Do You Go To (My Lovely)?"	8 March 1969	2
16	Marvin Gaye	"I Heard It Through the Grapevine"	22 March 1969	4
17	Desmond Dekker & The Aces	"Israelites"	19 April 1969	1
18	The Beatles with Billy Preston	"Get Back"	26 April 1969	4
19	Herman's Hermits	"My Sentimental Friend" ‡	24 May 1969	2
20	Tommy Roe	"Dizzy"	7 June 1969	2
21	The Beatles	"The Ballad of John and Yoko"	21 June 1969	2
22	Edwin Hawkins Singers	"Oh Happy Day" ‡	5 July 1969	1
23	Elvis Presley	"In the Ghetto" ‡	12 July 1969	1
24	Thunderclap Newman	"Something in the Air"	19 July 1969	1
25	The Rolling Stones	"Honky Tonk Women"	26 July 1969	2
26	Robin Gibb	"Saved by the Bell" ‡	9 August 1969	2
27	Stevie Wonder	"My Cherie Amour" ‡	23 August 1969	1
28	Zager and Evans	"In The Year 2525 (Exordium and Terminus)"	30 August 1969	4
29	Bee Gees	"Don't Forget to Remember" ‡	27 September 1969	1
30	Bobbie Gentry	"I'll Never Fall in Love Again"	4 October 1969	2
31	Jane Birkin and Serge Gainsbourg	"Je t'aime... moi non plus"	18 October 1969	2
32	The Archies	"Sugar, Sugar"	1 November 1969	2
33	Fleetwood Mac	"Oh Well" ‡	15 November 1969	2
34	The Tremeloes	"(Call Me) Number One" ‡	29 November 1969	2
35	Kenny Rogers and The First Edition	"Ruby, Don't Take Your Love to Town" ‡	13 December 1969	1
36	Rolf Harris	"Two Little Boys"	20 December 1969	6
1970
37	Marmalade	"Reflections of My Life" ‡	31 January 1970	1
38	Edison Lighthouse	"Love Grows (Where My Rosemary Goes)"	7 February 1970	3
39	The Jackson 5	"I Want You Back" ‡	28 February 1970	3
40	Simon & Garfunkel	"Bridge over Troubled Water"	21 March 1970	5
41	Norman Greenbaum	"Spirit in the Sky"	25 April 1970	4
42	England World Cup Squad "70"	"Back Home"	23 May 1970	1
43	Christie	"Yellow River"	30 May 1970	2
44	Mungo Jerry	"In the Summertime"	13 June 1970	4
45	Free	"All Right Now" ‡	11 July 1970	4
46	Elvis Presley	"The Wonder of You"	1 August 1970	3
47	Smokey Robinson and The Miracles	"The Tears of a Clown"	29 August 1970	4
48	Freda Payne	"Band of Gold"	26 September 1970	5
49	Deep Purple	"Black Night" ‡	31 October 1970	1
50	Matthews' Southern Comfort	"Woodstock"	7 November 1970	3
51	Don Fardon	"Indian Reservation" ‡	28 November 1970	1
52	Dave Edmunds's Rockpile	"I Hear You Knocking"	5 December 1970	2
53	McGuinness Flint	"When I'm Dead and Gone" ‡	19 December 1970	3
1971
54	Clive Dunn	"Grandad"	9 January 1971	3
55	George Harrison	"My Sweet Lord"	30 January 1971	4
