= Scene South East =

British TV regional news programme (1964–1981)

- Also known as: Friday on Ten, Scene Midweek
- Genre: News/features, South East England (regional)
- Country of origin: England

Production
- Running time: 30 minutes

Original release
- Network: Southern Television
- Release: 9 October 1964 – 18 December 1981

Related
- Coast to Coast; ITV News Meridian

Scene South East is a regional television news magazine programme produced by Southern Television, that covered the south east of England. The weekly sub-regional programme was broadcast from October 1964 to December 1981.

== History ==
Southern Television - which launched on 30 August 1958 to serve southern England - began broadcasting to Kent and East Sussex in January 1960 following the opening of the Dover transmitter.

Southern had won the right to extend its broadcast franchise eastwards by the Independent Television Authority, after the area was advertised separately. As part of the expansion, Southern opened a small television studio and offices on Russell Street in Dover in order to provide localised news opt-outs for the East of the region - the first television service of its kind in Britain.

On 9 October 1964, the service was expanded with the launch of Friday on Ten, a weekly topical magazine show whose name referred to Southern's transmission from Dover on VHF Channel 10. The show replaced the flagship news programme Day by Day (which continued to air in southern England). Later renamed as Scene South East, the programme featured a mix of topical reports, features, sporting previews and event guides as well as local news and weather.

The popularity of the Friday night programme later led to the launch in 1977 of a second shorter programme for South East viewers entitled Scene Midweek, which replaced part two of Day by Day on Wednesdays.

The news team in Dover also produced opt-out bulletins for Day by Day each weeknight, which were pre-recorded from Southern's Southampton studios shortly before transmission. Separate bulletins were also broadcast after News at Ten.

Alongside South East news coverage, the Dover production team also produced various programmes for Southern's broadcast area, including the nightly epilogue Guideline, rural affairs series Farm Progress and Dougalling, itself a spin-off series of Scene South East featuring reporter Donald Dougal's trademark walks in the region's countryside.

On 28 December 1980, Southern Television learned it was to lose its ITV regional franchise for the South and South East to Television South (TVS) marking a change to its South East regional service.

Under the company's plans, Southern had planned to build a new studio complex in Maidstone, if their bid to retain their licence was successful. In the event, the final edition of Scene South East aired on Friday 18 December 1981.

The Dover studios remained open to produce the successor's regional news service for the South East - the nightly Coast to Coast and regular TVS News bulletins. Once TVS's own Maidstone studios were opened, the Dover building was closed in 1983 and demolished a year later. The site is now a car park.

== Presenters/reporters ==
- Trevor Baker (Weather presenter)
- Tim Brinton (Main anchor)
- Jill Cochrane (Features reporter)
- Donald Dougall (Features reporter)
- Mike Field (Main anchor/reporter)
- Mike Fuller (News reporter)
- David Haigh (Programme editor/reporter)
- Malcolm Mitchell (sports editor)
- Pat Sloman
- Jeff Thomas
- Derek Williamson (News/features reporter)
- Arnie Wilson (Features reporter)
