= The Saturday Banana =

British children's TV series (1978 –1979)

- Genre: Children's
- Presented by: Bill Oddie
- Country of origin: United Kingdom
- Original language: English
- No. of series: 2
- No. of episodes: 34

Production
- Production company: Southern Television

Original release
- Network: ITV
- Release: 8 July 1978 – 22 December 1979

The Saturday Banana is a Saturday morning children's television show produced by Southern Television for ITV and presented by Goodies star Bill Oddie. Oddie also wrote and sang the theme tune. The series began on 8 July 1978, running through the summer and continuing up to December, with a Christmas Special.

According to a TV Times interview with Oddie when the show was aired, it was to have been named The Saturday Bonanza, but was renamed due to poor handwriting being mis-read.

The Saturday Banana was shown by several ITV stations including Anglia, Border, HTV, LWT, STV, Southern, Westward and Yorkshire. For its first run, the series was available to ITV companies at the same time as the popular Tiswas, so whether the viewer saw Tiswas or The Saturday Banana was up to their regional ITV station. For the series's second run in 1979, only Southern and Anglia broadcast the show while most other regions screened Tiswas.

The robot Metal Mickey first appeared on The Saturday Banana and went on to star in his own sitcom on London Weekend Television from 1980 to 1983. Bill Oddie returned to The Goodies.

The programme was broadcast live from Television Centre, Southampton, with occasional film inserts. The show took over from Our Show, another Saturday morning kids' programme, and Susan Tully, one of the young hosts of Our Show, came with it.

Presenters wore bright yellow T-shirts with the Banana logo, and metal circular badges, firstly on yellow backdrops, then mass-produced on red backdrops, were issued to both guests and the child audience chosen from local schools. For the programme, Southern Television built a giant yellow, peeled banana, which they placed in front of their studios, and which often featured in opening titles and in the background of any item where the cameras were taken outside the building. Around six opening title sequences were pre-recorded, backed by Oddie's theme song, including a one-off Christmas Special sequence.

Items featured on the show included a weekly chart rundown, with guest pop groups miming their latest hits, then being interviewed after being forced to slide down half of the main interior set. Children could also write-in with their 'dream activities', which show researchers would attempt to grant. One such feature saw Bill Oddie wrestle a small child in a side-sealed square filled with a foot of mud-coloured 'gunge'.

The Saturday Banana featured a version of the children's television game show Runaround, originally presented by comedian host Mike Reid but for The Saturday Banana's edition, one of the programme researchers who doubled as a presenter, Bill Gamon, hosted the madcap quiz.

On one show, actor George Chakiris, then starring in 'Passion of Dracula' in a London production at the Queen's Theatre, opened the show by being driven, in a horse-drawn hearse, across Northam Bridge (by the studios), bringing startled drivers to a virtual halt.

The opening programme featured a steam train on the railway siding that ran through the car park. The locomotive was Bonnie Prince Charlie borrowed from the Great Western Society at Didcot.

== Transmissions ==
Series	Start date	End date	Episodes
1	8 July 1978	30 December 1978	26
2	3 November 1979	22 December 1979	8
