= Metal Mickey =

Children's TV sitcom (ITV, 1980–83)

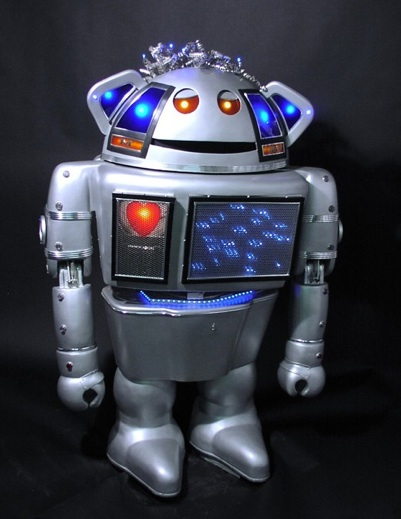
Metal Mickey, a robot character on UK children's television in the 1980s

Metal Mickey is a fictional five-foot-tall robot, as well as the name of a spin-off television show starring the same character. The robot character was created, controlled and voiced (using a Vocoder) by Johnny Edward.

The character of Metal Mickey first appeared on British television in the ITV children's magazine show The Saturday Banana, produced by Southern Television in 1978. Humphrey Barclay saw Mickey on Jimmy Savile's Jim'll Fix It television show. Seeing the children chatting in the marketplace with the friendly robot led to the creation of the Metal Mickey television show. Within a month the pilot had been video-taped, and shortly after this the series went live with its first six episodes. 41 episodes were made in total, broadcast over three separate series between September 1980 and January 1983. The show attracted viewing figures of around 12 million at its peak. Micky Dolenz, formerly of The Monkees pop group, was brought in to produce and direct the series along with Nic Phillips and David Crossman.

In 2001, the show was voted number 58 in Channel 4’s 100 Greatest Kids TV Shows.

== Metal Mickey television show ==
Metal Mickey
- Written by: Colin Bostock-Smith
- Starring: Metal Mickey
- Country of origin: United Kingdom

Production
- Producer: Michael Dolenz
- Production company: London Weekend Television

Original release
- Network: ITV
- Release: 6 September 1980 – 15 January 1983

The television show was created under LWT's Humphrey Barclay who described Metal Mickey as a show "with the appeal of Star Wars, the Daleks and Mork and Mindy". It ran from 1980 to 1983.

The series was set in the home of an ordinary British family, whose youngest child was a science boffin, who had created Metal Mickey to help around the home. The family consisted of a mother and father, three children and a grandmother. The show was made by London Weekend Television and shown on the ITV network, with the entire run of 41 episodes being written by comedy writer Colin Bostock-Smith.

British comedy actress Irene Handl played the grandmother, whom Mickey affectionately called "my little fruitbat" (she in turn would call him "Fluff"). He also referred to his inventor as "Clever Clogs", his inventor's sister as "Stringbean" and their father as "Bootface". Handl was never at home with science fiction, either watching it or appearing in it. She famously told BBC presenter Noel Edmonds, when he asked her whether she cried over the death of E.T., "Why should I cry over a bleedin' Hoover attachment?"

Metal Mickey's catchphrase was "boogie, boogie", and his favourite treat were Atomic Thunderbusters (which had the appearance of lemon bonbons). At the height of the series' popularity, fizzbomb sweets were marketed in the UK under the name Metal Mickey's Atomic Thunderbusters.

=== Cast ===
- Michael Stainton ... Father
- Georgina Melville ... Mother
- Ashley Knight ... Ken
- Lucinda Bateson ... Haley
- Lola Young ... Janey
- Gary Shail ... Steve
- Metal Mickey ... Metal Mickey
- Irene Handl ... Granny

=== Production credits ===
- Directors: Michael Dolenz, David Crossman, Nic Phillips
- Producer: Michael Dolenz
- Writer: Colin Bostock-Smith
- Designers: Mike Oxley, Rae George, David Catley, James Dillion, Phil Coulter
- Music: Phil Coulter

=== DVD releases ===
The first two series of Metal Mickey have been released on DVD. The third series was due to be released in mid-2009.

== Discography ==
Metal Mickey was credited as artist on several record releases, some of them on his own label "Mickeypops":

- "Lollipop"/"Eugene" (EMI, 1979)
- "Metal Mickey Magic"/"Meet Metal Mickey" (Mickeypops, 1980)
- "Sillycon Chip"/"Dubb Vahzun" (Mickeypops, 1981)
- "Do The Funky Robot"/"Do The Funky Robot Again" (Mickeypops, 1982)
- "Theme Tune From 'Metal Mickey'"/"Fruitbat Rap" (Hollywood, 1982)
- "I Wanna Hold Your Hand"/"Eugene Machino" (Hollywood, 1983)

== See also ==
- List of fictional robots and androids
- Science fiction sitcom
