= Renée and Renato =

British-Italian vocal duo

- Origin: Italy and the United Kingdom
- Genre: Pop
- Years active: 1980s
- Past members: Renato Pagliari, Hilary Lester

Renée and Renato were a female/male vocal duo, who had a UK number-one hit in December 1982 with "Save Your Love". The follow-up single "Just One More Kiss" peaked at No. 48. Subsequent singles "A Little Bitta Me" and "Jesus Loves Us All" failed to reach the Top 75 of the UK singles charts, settling in positions 175 and 100 respectively.

Renato Pagliari was born on 28 June 1940, in Blera, Lazio, Italy and attended a school for professional waiter's, which equipped him to perform in five star restaurant's working in several countries, singing Neopolitan songs and operatic arias in the style of Enrico Caruso, he subsequently immigrating to England where he based himself in Sutton Coldfield, West Midlands, where he auditioned for ITV's talent show New Faces in 1975, catching the attention of songwriter, Johnny Edward, who had written "Save Your Love".

He was teamed by Edward with British singer Hilary Lester and the duo was renamed Renée and Renato. They recorded the song, "Save Your Love", which became the 1982 Christmas number oneand also chartered well in the Netherlands and Norway and peaked at number 3 in Australia in 1983.

Renato stressed that the duo was never in a relationship and she was replaced by a stand-in in the video clip, By that stage Lester had already joined another group, and the contractually enforced follow-up "Just One More Kiss" peaked at number 55 in Australia.

Lester returned to private life after the fame died down, but Renato still sang, and recorded six solo albums and mainly performed on cruise ships and occasionally at his son's restaurant, Renato's, in Tamworth, Staffordshire.

His later credits included a guest spot on the TV comedy show Little and Large. He is also rumoured to have been the singer for the Wall's ice cream jingle "Just One Cornetto" (although this is claimed not to be the case by Pagliari's son, Remo). He also issued several albums.

Renato was a fan of Aston Villa F.C. and during the early 1990s was asked by manager Ron Atkinson to sing "Nessun dorma" at half time following a particularly poor first half performance by the team. On completion of his performance Atkinson told the players "Now that is passion! Go and show me some of that in the second half"! When Atkinson appeared on the TV show Room 101, Atkinson claimed that only Luciano Pavarotti could sing "Nessun Dorma" better than Renato.

== Death ==
Renato died from complications following surgery on a brain tumour at Good Hope Hospital, Sutton Coldfield, on 29 July 2009, aged 69.

== Discography ==
=== Albums ===
| Title | Album details | Peak chart positions |
| Title | Album details | AUS |
|---|---|---|
| Just One... | Released: September 1983; Label: Hollywood; Formats: LP, MC | 7 |
| Only You | Released: 1984; Label: Hollywood; Formats: LP, MC; Australia-only release | 29 |
| Wanting You | Released: 1985; Label: Starcall Victor; Formats: LP, MC; Australia-only release | 94 |
| Carousel of Love | Released: 1988; Label: Front Page; Formats: CD, LP, MC; Europe-only release | — |
"—" denotes releases that did not chart or were not released in that territory.

==== Renato albums ====
| Title | Album details | Peak chart positions | | |
| Title | Album details | UK | NOR | SWE |
|---|---|---|---|---|
| A Song for You | Released: 1978; Label: Zel-La; Formats: LP | — | — | — |
| Save Your Love | Released: December 1982; Label: Lifestyle; Formats: LP, MC; Re-release of A Song for You with added track "Save Your Love" | 26 | 11 | 39 |
| A Taste of Italy | Released: 1989; Label: RCA; Formats: CD, LP | — | — | — |
| Renato | Released: Label: Formats: CD | — | — | — |
| Renato's International Selection | Released: Label: Formats: CD | — | — | — |
| Around The World With Love... | Released: Label: Formats: CD | — | — | — |
"—" denotes releases that did not chart or were not released in that territory.

=== Singles ===
| Title | Year | Peak chart positions | | | | | | | | | |
| Title | Year | UK | AUS | BE (FL) | DEN | GER | IRE | NL | NOR | SWE | SWI |
|---|---|---|---|---|---|---|---|---|---|---|---|
| "Save Your Love" | 1982 | 1 | 3 | 1 | 2 | 10 | 1 | 2 | 1 | 3 | 4 |
| "Just One More Kiss" | 1983 | 48 | 55 | — | 12 | 56 | 27 | — | — | — | — |
| "A Little Bitta Me" | 1983 | 175 | — | — | — | — | — | — | — | — | — |
| "Magic Night" (Germany-only release) | 1983 | — | — | — | — | — | — | — | — | — | — |
| "Jesus Loves Us All" | 1983 | 100 | — | — | 12 | — | — | — | — | — | — |
| "Only You" | 1984 | — | — | — | — | — | — | — | — | — | — |
| "Are You Lonesome Tonight" (Netherlands-only release) | 1988 | — | — | — | — | — | — | — | — | — | — |
"—" denotes releases that did not chart or were not released in that territory.

==== Renato singles ====
| Title | Year | Peak chart positions |
| Title | Year | UK |
|---|---|---|
| "She Wears My Ring" | 1982 | 138 |
| "Funiculi, Funicula" | 1986 | — |
| "It's Impossible to See You" | 1989 | — |
"—" denotes releases that did not chart.
