= Trevor Baker =

British weather forecaster (1921-2016)

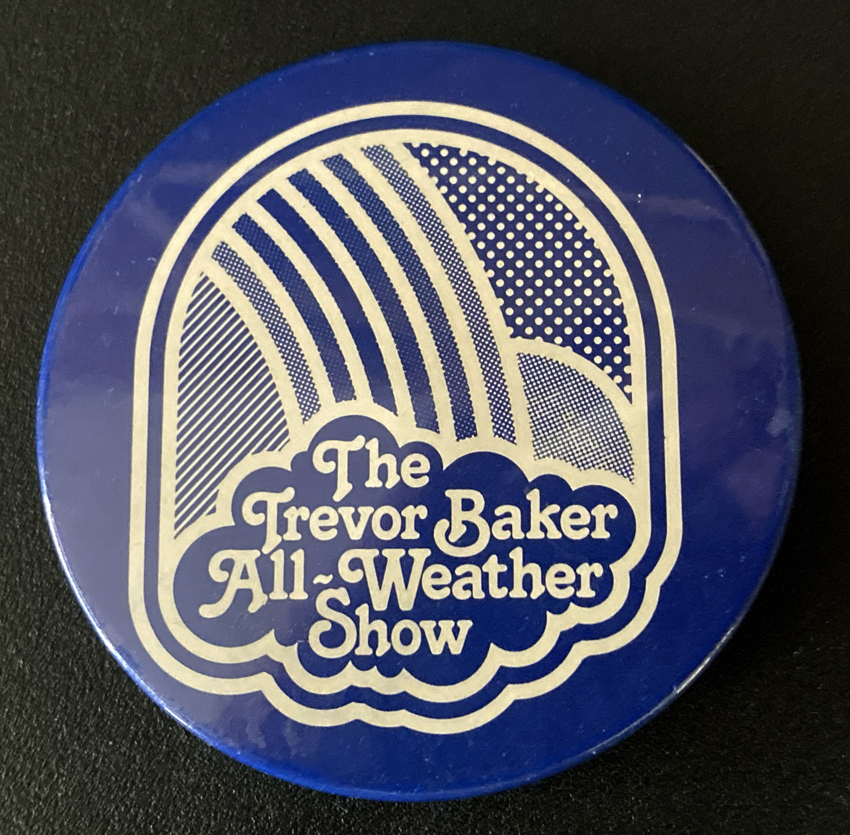
The Trevor Baker All-Weather Show promo button

Trevor Baker (27 August 1921 – 19 August 2016) was a British meteorologist. He joined the Met Office in 1941 and worked all over the UK (as well as a stint in Hong Kong between 1953 and 1956) before being seconded to the BBC in 1962. After a few months he moved to Southern Television's evening news magazine Day by Day. He worked with a number of different co-presenters including Cliff Michelmore, Barry Westwood and Fred Dinenage and his role gradually expanded (reading out congratulatory messages, writing a book) until eventually he was given his own show The Trevor Baker All Weather Show. Baker remained in his position when the franchise changed to TVS (Television South) in 1982 and continued on until 1987. When people in Southampton said "Trevor says it's going to be fine today", nobody ever said "Trevor who?". He had achieved that ultimate accolade, accorded to very few, of being immediately identifiable by his first name. In all he was on-air for 25 years —at the time Britain's longest-serving TV weather forecaster.

== See also ==
- Southern Television
