= Pass the Buck (1998 British game show) =

- Genre: Game show
- Presented by: Fred Dinenage (1998); Eamonn Holmes (1999–2000)
- Country of origin: United Kingdom
- Original language: English
- No. of series: 3
- No. of episodes: 117

Production
- Production locations: New Broadcasting House (1998); Granada Studios (1999–2000)
- Running time: 25 minutes (1998); 30 minutes (1999–2000)
- Production companies: Zenith; Blaze Television; BBC Manchester

Original release
- Network: BBC One
- Release: 12 October 1998 – 28 June 2000

Pass the Buck was a British television quiz show which aired on daytime on BBC One. Created by The Chatterbox Partnership. It ran for three series from 12 October 1998 to 28 June 2000. The programme was originally hosted by Fred Dinenage in 1998, then by Eamonn Holmes from 1999 to 2000.

== Format ==
=== Fast Buck ===
The players stood on the top step of a staircase, and one was chosen at random to begin the round. The host gave a general category (i.e. "United Kingdom") and a detail about it (i.e. "days on which the Union Jack is flown on government buildings"). Each player in turn had to give a valid answer to remain in the game. The first player who gave an invalid answer, repeated any opponent's previous answer, or failed to respond within three seconds was eliminated for the day. All remaining players moved one step down toward the studio floor, and the host gave a new category and detail; play then resumed with the next player in line. In some cases, the host would give an example of a valid response and warn the players not to use it. In 2000, losing players received a t-shirt and mug.

The round continued until five players remained. In 1998, with the exception of Fridays, all eliminated players returned to compete on the next episode. Each Monday featured a pool of 15 new players; those who won a Monday-Thursday episode sat out until Friday, reducing the pool by one each day.

=== The Big Buck Game ===
The five players left standing after Fast Buck played this game to determine the day's winner. As before, all players eliminated from Monday-Thursday games returned to compete on the next episode.

==== Pass It On ====
The five players were each given three lives. The host gave a category and detail, and one player was chosen at random to start the round. They had to give a valid answer, then choose an opponent to give the next one. When a player missed, repeated, or failed to respond in three seconds, they lost one life and play resumed with the next player in line using a new category and detail. Players were eliminated upon losing all three lives; the round ended when only two remained. From 1999 to 2000, the other three players returned to the next programme.

==== Memory Moment ====
Played only during the Eamonn Holmes era; he read a list of 18 words and the players took turns recalling one word at a time, with penalties as before.

==== The Buck Stops Here ====
The host gave a category and detail, and the two players alternated giving one answer at a time. Each correct answer scored one point; when one player missed, repeated, or did not respond in three seconds, a new category/detail were given and play resumed with the opponent. The player with more lives remaining from Pass It On started the round; if the players were tied in this respect, one was chosen at random.

The high scorer after time expired (90 seconds in 1998, 2 minutes and 30 seconds in 1999, and 2 minutes in 2000) became the day's winner. In 1998, the winner competed against the other four daily winners in Friday’s Pass It On round. From 1999 to 2000, the winner chose one of three prizes. If the scores were tied when time ran out, one last, un-timed category was played and the first player to fail lost.

== Final ==
In 1998, the daily Monday-Thursday winners had their names placed on the week's "Big Buck Board" and sat out until Friday, in which the remaining 11 players competed in Fast Buck until only one was left. That player's name was added to the board, and they then joined the four earlier winners to play the Big Buck Game under the normal rules.

The Friday winner received £1,000 and a trophy, and all other daily winners received a portable television and a sweatshirt. The other four daily winners each received a pocket television and a sweatshirt.

From 1999 to 2000, the field started with 12 players, including the last four to be eliminated on the last programme, and the winner chose one of three prizes.

== Transmissions ==
Series	Episodes	Originally released	
Series	Episodes	First released	Last released
1	50	12 October 1998	18 December 1998
2	30	6 September 1999	15 October 1999
3	37	8 May 2000	28 June 2000
