= Just One More Kiss =

"Just One More Kiss" may refer to:

- "Just One More Kiss" by Bix Beiderbecke Jean Goldkette & His Orchestra
- Just One More Kiss (Buck-Tick song)
- Just One More Kiss (Renée and Renato song), 1983
