= Top Pops (newspaper) =

British newspaper

- Cover of Top Pops issue 9 (7 November 1967)
- Editor: Marcus Davidson, Colin Bostock-Smith, Jeff Tarry, John Halsall, Jim Watson
- Categories: Music newspaper
- Frequency: Monthly, later fortnightly, later weekly
- First issue: May 1967
- Final issue: 21 February 1970
- Country: United Kingdom
- Language: English

Top Pops, not to be confused with Top of the Pops, was a British pop music newspaper that was published in the late 1960s and early 1970s. Top Pops was founded initially as a three-weekly publication by Woodrow Wyatt in May 1967, with Marcus Davidson acting as editor. It was conceived as a circulation-booster for the provincial newspapers published by Wyatt, following the success of an insert called 'The Monkees Special', which sold over 100,000 copies and kept the printing works at Banbury busy for over a month.

Under Davidson's successor Colin Bostock-Smith, Top Pops moved to Fleet Street and became fortnightly in November 1967, then weekly in June 1968. It was unusual for including colour content from its first issue, but found it hard to compete with its rivals, partly because it was initially based in Banbury, not London. On 20 September 1969 the paper was rebranded Top Pops & Music Now under the then editor John Halsall and subsequently became Music Now after a staff buyout in March 1970, when former Record Mirror editor Jim Watson took over. The newspaper ceased publication in February 1971.

In 1968, Wyatt demanded that part of its content be published in numerous European languages, to showcase his support of the 'I'm Backing Britain' campaign. At all times it was printed by Papers & Publications (Printers) Ltd in Banbury, Oxfordshire (owned by Wyatt). Jeff Tarry took over as editor in September 1968, but resigned in March 1969 over Wyatt's refusal to invest further funds in the paper. His successor was John Halsall, who shifted its focus onto more serious coverage of progressive and underground rock. As of issue 90 (20 September 1969), Top Pops was renamed Top Pops & Music Now, shortly after which Halsall departed in October. In November Wyatt sold his interest to production manager Doug Collins and former Record Mirror editor Jim Watson, who renamed it plain Music Now as of the 21 March 1970 issue.

For the 11 months of its existence, Music Now carved out a vital niche in the British music press, offering exclusive interviews / photo spreads with stars such as Jimi Hendrix, Led Zeppelin, Pink Floyd, Black Sabbath, King Crimson, Jethro Tull, David Bowie, Family, Elton John, Marc Bolan and Free (almost none of which have been drawn on since) as well as detailed feature coverage of an array of obscure bands (Mighty Baby, The Idle Race, Trees, Orange Bicycle) and a panoply of interesting reviews and adverts.

Having long suffered from financial problems, it ceased publication as of issue 50 (21 February 1970), when the postal strike hit it hard. Its circulation at this time was reported to be 20,000.

== See also ==
- List of Top Pops number-one singles
