= Just One Kiss =

Just One Kiss may refer to:

- "Just One Kiss" (Exile song), a 1988 song
- "Just One Kiss" (Nick Carter song), a 2011 song
- "Just One Kiss" (CSI: Miami episode), a 2002 TV episode
- "Just One Kiss", a 2021 song by Imelda May and Noel Gallagher from 11 Past the Hour
- "Jus 1 Kiss", a 2001 song by Basement Jaxx
- Just One Kiss, a 2022 Hallmark TV film

== See also ==
- Just One More Kiss (disambiguation)
- Just a Kiss (disambiguation)
