= Gambit (British game show) =

British TV game show (1975–1995)

- Genre: Game show
- Created by: Merrill Heatter; Bob Quigley
- Presented by: Fred Dinenage; Tom O'Connor; Gary Thompson
- Starring: Ann Dunsford; Michelle Lambourne; Joanna Park
- Country of origin: United Kingdom
- Original language: English
- No. of series: 11
- No. of episodes: 142

Production
- Running time: 30 minutes (inc. adverts)
- Production company: Anglia

Original release
- Network: ITV
- Release: 3 July 1975 – 28 May 1985
- Network: Anglia
- Release: 23 July – 5 November 1995

Related
- Gambit

Gambit is a British game show based on the American version of the same name. It first aired on ITV from 3 July 1975 to 28 May 1985, hosted by Fred Dinenage from 1975 to 1983 and finally hosted by Tom O'Connor from 1984 to 1985. It was revived from 23 July to 5 November 1995 only in the Anglia region with Gary Thompson as host.

== Gameplay ==
=== Original Version ===
==== Main Game ====
The object of the game was that of blackjack: come as close to 21 as possible without going over (or "busting"). As in blackjack, the cards from 2 to 10 were worth their face value; picture cards (Kings, Queens and Jacks) counted as 10 and Aces could count as either 1 or 11.

The host asked a series of questions to two married couples. The couple who buzzed in and answered the question correctly won control of the top card from a deck of over-sized (but otherwise regulation) playing cards. An incorrect answer gave the opposing couple a chance to respond and steal control of the card. The first card was shown face up at the beginning of each game, but each subsequent card was presented face down and then turned up once the couple in control decided who should receive it.

The couple who gained control of a card could either add it to their own hand or pass it to their opponents. After a couple received any card, whether by taking it for themselves or having it passed to them, they could elect to stick if they had a total of 12 or higher and were in the lead. Once a couple stuck, they could not answer any questions or receive any more cards for the remainder of that game; the opponents then answered up to three more questions in an attempt to best them, receiving a card after each correct answer. Sticking was not permitted if the scores were tied.

A couple could win a game in any of the following ways:

- Reaching 21 exactly. Doing so awarded the Gambit Jackpot, a cash prize that began at £200 and increased by £50 after each match in which it went unclaimed, to a maximum of £500.
- If their opponents busted.
- If they stuck and their opponents either gave two incorrect answers or failed to exceed their total after playing all three questions, whichever came first.
- If their opponents stuck and they exceeded that total without busting.

Each game won was worth £20. The first couple to win two games won the match and advanced to the bonus round.

==== The Gambit Board ====
The winning couple played the Gambit Board, which displayed numbers from 1 to 21 that had prizes hidden behind them. On each turn, the couple chose a number from 1 to 20, received the prize behind it, and had a card added to their hand. They could not choose #21, which concealed a group of star prizes.

The game could end in one of three ways:

- Choosing to stick, which allowed them to keep all prizes revealed to that point. A couple could stick if they feared that the next card would cause them to bust, or if they had found a desirable prize and did not want to risk losing it.
- Busting, which forfeited all prizes.
- Reaching 21 exactly, which allowed them to keep all revealed prizes and also gave a choice of the star prizes hidden behind #21.

Couples remained on the show until they were defeated in the main game, won a star prize, or played the Gambit Board twice. Prizes won from the board were removed from play in subsequent playings, along with their associated numbers. If a couple chose to stick, the next card would be dealt from the deck in order to learn whether they would have busted by playing on.

=== 1995 version ===
For this version, the rules and setup were radically different (inspired by an unsold American Gambit pilot from 1990). Two solo players competed, and were asked a question with two possible answers. The answers would appear on a video screen to the right of the host's podium and the contestant who rang in would have to determine if one, both, or neither of the two answers applied to the question. Answering a question correctly would earn them a card, which they had the option of passing or keeping. As before, contestants had the option of sticking.

== Transmissions ==
Series	Start date	End date	Episodes
1	3 July 1975	25 September 1975	13
2	2 July 1976	24 September 1976	13
3	12 July 1977	6 October 1977	13
4	15 July 1978	5 October 1978	13
5	30 March 1979	22 June 1979	13
6	28 October 1980	20 January 1981	12
7	5 April 1982	12 July 1982	14
8	25 March 1983	23 June 1983	11
9	14 May 1984	13 August 1984	13
10	26 February 1985	28 May 1985	14
11	23 July 1995	5 November 1995	13
