= Just a Kiss =

Just a Kiss may refer to:

== Film and television ==
- Just a Kiss (film), a 2002 dark comedy directed by Fisher Stevens
- Just a Kiss or Ae Fond Kiss..., a 2004 romantic drama film directed by Ken Loach
- "Just a Kiss", a 1999 episode of Casualty

== Music ==
- "Just a Kiss" (song), a 2011 song by Lady Antebellum
- "Just a Kiss", a song by School Gyrls from the album School Gyrls, 2010
- "Just a Kiss", a 2009 song by Mishon Ratliff

== See also ==
- Just One Kiss (disambiguation)
