= Colin Bostock-Smith =

British television and radio comedy writer

Colin Bostock-Smith (born 1942) is a British television and radio comedy writer.

== Early career ==
Until the age of 30, he was a journalist, noting in a review of an early performance by the Beatles ("four young men with four fringes, three guitars, and some drums") that they were "not nearly as bad as they might have been". He later edited the music newspaper Top Pops. He always had—in his words—"this feeling that I would like to write comedy", starting in this area with contributions to the BBC Radio 4 show Week Ending.

Bostock-Smith has contributed to a significant number of British television comedies. In a 2008 interview, he noted that he was the sole writer of all 41 episodes of the early-1980s ITV sitcom Metal Mickey, and said he is most proud of his work on Not the Nine O'Clock News and the sitcom Me and My Girl.

== Selected credits ==
=== Writing contributions ===
- Not the Nine O'Clock News
- Up The Elephant and Round The Castle
- Smith and Jones
- Clive James (The Clive James Show, Friday Night Clive, Saturday Night Clive)
- Basil Brush
- Metal Mickey (Wrote all 41 episodes)
- Terry and June
- Week Ending
- Punchlines (for BBC Radio 2)
- Bruce Forsyth's Big Night
- The Two Ronnies
- Shelley
- Crackerjack ("The Krankies! I wrote a lot for The Krankies")
- Me and My Girl
- Roland Rat
- Naked Video
- Trouble in Mind
- Who Dares Wins
- Russ Abbot
- The Odd Job (novelisation of the 1978 film)

=== Other ===
- As Time Goes By (Bostock-Smith claims he only came up with the original concept, saying "I’ve never written a word of it. [..] I didn’t even write the title. It was my idea, you see.")
