= Anne Dawson (broadcaster) =

British journalist and academic

Anne Dawson is an English academic, formerly a broadcast journalist and television presenter.

== Journalism career ==
After studying English at Exeter University, Salisbury-born Dawson began her career as a trainee journalist at the Salisbury Times and Journal before joining Radio Victory in Portsmouth, then BBC Radio Brighton BBC South Today in Southampton as a production journalist, reporter and presenter. She also worked for the South East edition of TVS's regional news programme Coast to Coast, as a district reporter in Brighton and later, Maidstone.

In January 1989, Dawson became a main presenter of the then-new Central News South service for the South Midlands, alongside Wesley Smith. The presenting duo became the longest-serving partnership in ITV regional news. As well as presenting Central News South, she presented non-news regional programmes including Lifeline, Central Post and Heart of the Country (as a reporter).

== Teaching career ==
In 2001, Dawson turned down a presenting role on the ITV News Channel with a view to presenting national news bulletins on ITV1. A year later, she left Central News South and began training as a teacher, during which, she taught English Literature in several secondary schools in Oxfordshire.

Dawson founded and led the School of Creative Industries at the University of Gloucestershire, based at the Park Campus studios in Cheltenham.
