= Television Centre, Southampton =

Former headquarters of the ITV contractors Southern, TVS and Meridian

Television Centre
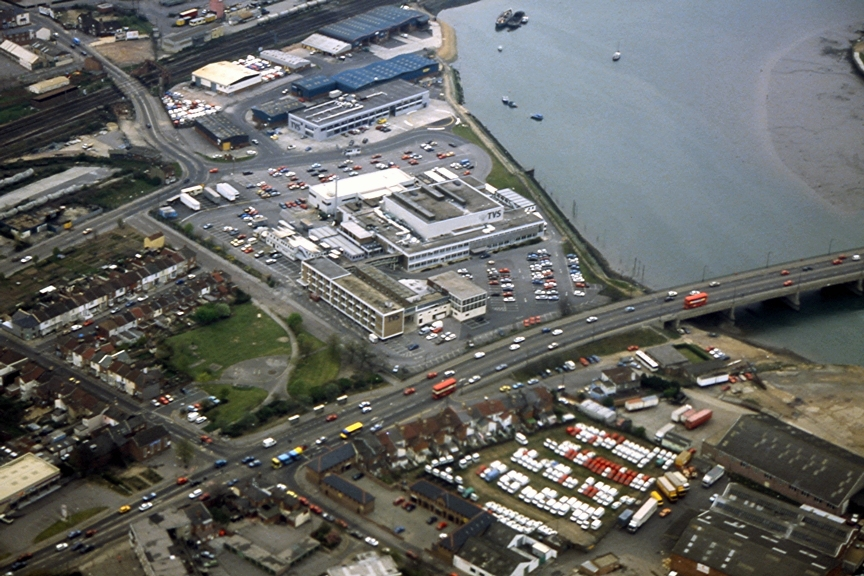
- Aerial photo of the studio complex in 1991

- Location within Southampton
- Alternative names: The Southampton Television Centre

General information
- Type: Television studios
- Location: On the banks of the River Itchen, adjacent to Northam Bridge and the A3024. Access to the site was from rear., Southampton, SO14 0PZ
- Coordinates: 50°54′49″N 1°23′18″W
- Construction started: 1967
- Inaugurated: 19 August 1969
- Demolished: Summer 2008
- Cost: £2,500,000
- Owner: Southern Television, Television South, Meridian Broadcasting

Technical details
- Floor count: 2

Television Centre, Southampton was home to the three ITV contractors for the South and South East region: Southern, TVS, and Meridian. It was also known as The Southern Television Centre, The Southampton Television Centre, and unofficially as The Northam Studios.

The studio centre was constructed in 1967, vacated in 2004 and demolished in 2008. The site remained empty until 2015 when a £40 million development scheme to build 350 flats began.

== History ==
The site was built by Southern Television, the first ITV contractor for the South of England, as replacement facilities for their converted cinema studios. The cinema itself had been 'The Plaza'. The new complex was located on the same site as the original cinema, on land reclaimed from the River Itchen.

The new complex was state of the art and fully equipped for colour television, launched in the region in 1969. Southern moved into the new complex on 19 August that year. The site had two large production studios, ready to produce many of Southern's programme productions for the ITV Network. It was from here that Southern's news operations were also based, with a separate studio for their news programme Day by Day. The site also featured access to the river where Southern's motor boat Southerner could be moored, allowing for easy and quick access for a news team to take to the water.

One unusual feature of the site was the railway line that ran through the car park; this linked the British Rail sidings at Northam to Driver's Wharf where scrap metal was loaded into ships. It was operated by a venerable 0-4-0 diesel shunter. In 1984, the line fell into disuse as the scrap was now delivered by road. The tracks were then tarmacked over to provide extra car parking spaces. The line featured in the first episode of Saturday Banana with a steam locomotive, Bonnie Prince Charlie, from the Great Western Society at Didcot.

During the 1980 ITV franchise round, the newly enlarged South and South East region was much sought after, having the highest advertising revenues. Southern was replaced as ITV contractor by Television South, or TVS for short. In August 1981, TVS completed the purchase of the site but, prior to the new company taking control of the region, they had no office space within the buildings and so based their operations in portakabins located in the car park, while Southern continued their operation inside; this was mocked on the closing night of Southern, with the song "Portakabin TV" performed by its composer Richard Stilgoe, though the arrangement was later repeated by Meridian as they waited to take over from TVS.

TVS continued producing programmes at the Southampton base, and increased production significantly throughout their period. As a result, they created a number of extensions with a new car park, scenery blocks, production offices and a location facilities garage in the ex-Fairways Marine building. The main office building was connected to the studio block by an elevated walkway. They continued successfully until 1991, when another franchise round occurred and they lost, possibly as a result of financial problems the company incurred previously, following the takeover of MTM Enterprises.

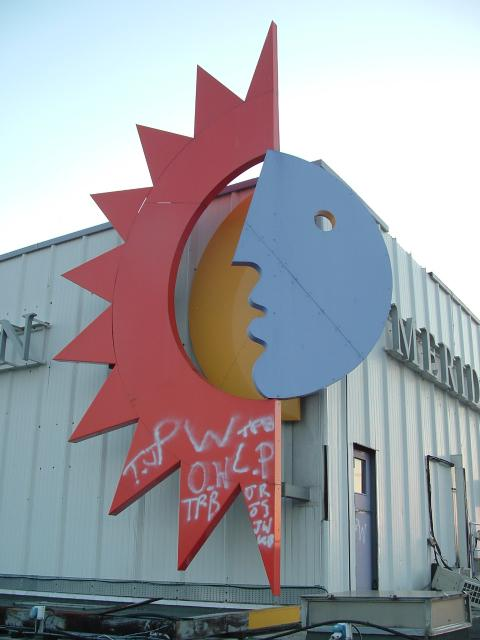
Meridian logo on side of building up close, following closure of studios (there is graffiti on the bottom of the logo)

The new franchise holder, Meridian Broadcasting, originally had plans to base itself in an office unit (which it did a little over 10 years later), as its operation required only presentation and play out facilities with a small studio for local news; they had no plans to make programmes themselves and would therefore have no use for a studio facility as large as the TVS base in Southampton. This would have left TVS with two studio complexes, the modern studios in Maidstone being their first choice for a base as an independent production company. However, following TVS's franchise loss, the two companies negotiated the takeover of the studios by Meridian, ending in the latter's purchase of the Northam studio complex. This also preserved a number of jobs originally not planned by Meridian. However, it still meant huge job losses: 100 of the original TVS workforce of 760 continued to work for Meridian, the others mainly working as freelancers, many for independent companies.

On 1 January 1993, Meridian took control of the franchise. Despite not originally intending to own such a huge facility, they did put it to good use, with some productions made in the studios there. Meridian also rented out these studio space to other independent production companies, including programmes commissioned directly for Meridian. Following Meridian's merger with Anglia Television and HTV to form United News & Media, some playout and presentation facilities for these regions were moved to Northam, saving the company a significant amount of money. Their productions also increased in 1997, following the launch of Channel 5 (which was part owned by United News & Media) as many of the new channel's programmes were made at Northam.

However, in 2000, United News & Media's television assets were bought by Granada plc, which in 2004 merged with Carlton Communications to form ITV plc, a new company owning all the ITV franchises in England, Wales and South Scotland. This also left the new company with at least thirteen studio complexes: the production centres of all of the companies they had taken over. It was decided that this number should be reduced to The London Studios, formerly of LWT; The Leeds Studios, formerly of ITV Yorkshire; and The Manchester Studios (alternatively called 3sixtymedia), formerly of ITV Granada, with all other studio complexes being sold and replaced with small scale offices and news gathering centres.

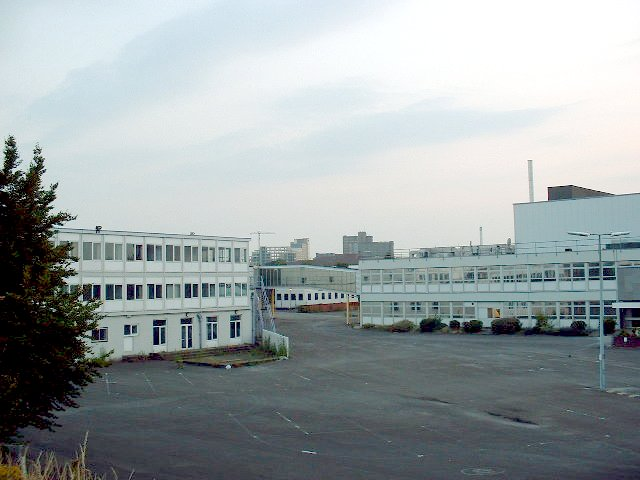
The derelict studios

Meridian's main studio complex was not as big as some of the other production sites, was too close to The London Studios to be useful, and was not in a central location; it was also surplus to requirements for the region, and nearly 35 years old. It was therefore decided that the Northam studios would be closed, and all operations moved to a new purpose-built unit at Whiteley. The last network production at the Northam studios was in June 2004, with the last live programme being the late night Meridian Tonight on 17 December that year. As the new studio complex was fully equipped, all equipment, furniture and other more unusual lots (such as the original TVS portakabins) were auctioned off on 3 March 2005.

In the years following the move, some areas of the Northam studios were dismantled, with technical equipment being stripped from the building, such as miles of cables. For many years afterwards, the building stood empty and neglected, while a decision was made as to the future of the site. Demolition of the outlying buildings began in the summer of 2008. The site was partially dismantled and demolished, and then the main building – the original studio built by Southern – was finally demolished in 2009. The site remained empty after its initial developer, Oakdene, went into administration in 2009. In 2015, work started on surveying and clearing the site ready for the anticipated construction of 350 flats on the site by Inland Homes.

== See also ==
- Southern Television
- Television South
- Meridian
- Northam, Southampton
