= Southerner (marine vessel) =

Southerner was a marine outside broadcast unit operated by Southern Television in the United Kingdom from the mid-1960s.

== Origins ==
In the early 1960s, Southern Television hired the former Proud Grenadier motor torpedo boat MTB 506 (which was named Winola at that time) as a platform to provide coverage of Cowes Week, a famous maritime event held off the coast of the Isle of Wight. The initial installation was rather makeshift but, realising its potential, Southern decided to acquire the vessel for further development. The boat was thoroughly overhauled to house a complete and unique outside broadcast facility and, following this work, was renamed Southerner.

== Configuration ==
The Proud class was assigned to refurbished motor torpedo boat vessels originally manufactured by the British Power Boat Company during the Second World War. The Winola had been upgraded with gas turbine engines by the Marine Turbo Craft company, who had owned the craft before it was bought by Southern Television. In adapting the Southerner, forward bulkheads were removed to accommodate a 350 kg video recorder and other equipment, all of which could be installed and removed by crane for relatively easy turnaround. Two 4.5 inch image orthicon cameras were installed at the sides of the front deck while a third was mounted on top of the cabin for an all-round view. The cabin also housed the production control room.

The craft was over 70 ft long and displaced over 50 tons but was nonetheless quite fast with a top speed of over 40 knots.

== Productions ==
Southerner had the ability to transmit live pictures back to shore and also to record video for subsequent editing. The maritime tradition of the south coast of England (Southern Television's reception area) provided many opportunities to use the craft, which was used to cover Cowes Week and the Fastnet race as well as one-off boating and water skiing events. Additionally, Southerner was notably used to produce the sea-themed children's drama, Freewheelers, and A Tale of Two Rivers, a musical programme recorded on the rivers Seine and Thames to contrast the cities of Paris and London. Sometimes, the vessel was even used to provide a live feed to the entire ITV network. One such occasion was June 4, 1968 when Sir Alec Rose arrived at Portsmouth following his single-handed voyage around the world. The event was due to be covered by the London ITV contractor Rediffusion but it pulled out when one of its engineers was fatally injured during preparation.

== Later use ==
The vessel, or at least a substantial part of the hull, was known to be operating as the pleasure boat Ambra in Malta up until the summer of 2005, after which it fell into disuse. In 2007 it was deemed uneconomic to refurbish and was broken up.
