= Barry Westwood =

Barry Westwood (7 September 1927 – 3 July 2011) was an English presenter and producer at ITV franchise Southern Television from 1959 until 1981. For most of that time, he was the front-man of Day by Day, the station's evening news magazine.

He was also in The Race Apart, Afloat and The Barry Westwood Talkabout.

Known affectionately as "Mr. Southern Television", he retired. Up until his death, he resided in Buckinghamshire.

He died in hospital on 13 July 2011 at the age 83.
