= Jok (spirit) =

Spirit beings in Uganda and South Sudan

Jok (also spelled jogi or joogi) is a term for a class of spirits in the traditional belief system of the Acholi people of Uganda and South Sudan. Jok are believed to be the cause of illness, misfortune, and death, as well as the source of power, protection, and prosperity. Traditional healers (known as ajakwa) first identify the Jok in question and then make an appropriate sacrifice and ceremony to counter them. Alternatively if such an approach was unsuccessful the person possessed by the Jok could go through a series of rituals to gain some level of control over the Jok and then themselves become ajakwa. Jok can be ancestral or non-ancestral, and can be attached to specific clans, chiefdoms, natural phenomena, or historical events. Jok was believed to be the supreme god, who is the creator and ruler of the universe.

== Types of Jok ==
The Acholi believed there was one main African god known as Jok. However, Jok has many duplicates of himself that involve themselves in people's affairs. The range of Jok is extensive and includes a number that have been influenced by the experience of colonization. According to Acholi cosmology, there are three main types of jok:

- Ancestral jok: These are the spirits of deceased relatives, especially lineage ancestors, who are revered and honored by their living descendants. Ancestral jok are generally benevolent and helpful, but they can also be angry and vengeful if they are neglected or offended. Ancestral jok are consulted and appeased through rituals, sacrifices, prayers, and offerings, usually performed by elders or traditional healers (ajakwa).
- Non-ancestral jok: These are the spirits of other entities, such as animals, plants, rocks, rivers, mountains, stars, or the sun. Non-ancestral jok are usually associated with a specific clan or chiefdom, and they are regarded as the guardians and patrons of their respective groups. Non-ancestral jok can be benevolent or malevolent, depending on their nature and the relationship with their human followers. Non-ancestral jok are also invoked and propitiated through rituals, sacrifices, prayers, and offerings, usually performed by chiefs or ajakwa.
- Jogi: These are the duplicates or manifestations of the supreme Jok, who is the one and only god. Jogi are involved in human affairs and can influence the fate of individuals and communities. Jogi can be pleased or angered by human actions, and they can reward or punish accordingly. Jogi are also responsive to human requests and petitions, and they can grant blessings or curses. Jogi are worshipped and respected through rituals, sacrifices, prayers, and offerings, usually performed by ajakwa or religious specialists.

== Worshiping Jok ==
The abila was a special place like a temple, dedicated to Jok, and ancestors' spirits who were believed to watch over the Acholi. Inside the abila, people would offer food and drinks to the jok, like a thank you and to ask for their favor. These spirits weren't always in the abila, but they could appear nearby or even travel around, sending messages through special signs. The Acholi worshipped the Jok for many reasons, hoping they would heal the sick, bring good luck on hunts, and protect the village from bad things. To keep the Jok happy, people held special ceremonies at the abila where they'd give them food and drinks.

The Acholi Jok was similar to Christians' idea of God. But when Christianity came to the Acholi, they insisted on using the word Lubanga for God, even though in the Acholi language, Lubanga meant something scary like death.
