= Mai Davies =

British journalist and television presenter

Mai Davies (born 1964) is a Welsh journalist and television presenter.

Born in Carmarthen, South Wales, she started her career at HTV Wales in Cardiff as a reporter and presenter on Wales at 6. She then moved within the regional ITV network to TVS where she became one of the main presenters of its nightly news programme, Coast to Coast, often alongside Fred Dinenage. From the start of 1993, Meridian Television took over the ITV franchise for southern England, and she transferred to the new company, becoming the main anchor for its new news programme from Newbury, serving the northern part of the region. During this time, the programme won the Royal Television Society award for the best Regional News Magazine programme.

After becoming freelance, she presented across a series of channels, including ITV Wales's political programme Waterfront until the end of 2009, but also including Channel 5, BBC Radio 4, BBC Radio 5 Live, and the BBC World Service. In 2009 Davies, widely regarded as "ITV’s face of Welsh politics", was replaced as the host of Wales This Week by Jonathan Hill. She then moved to become a daytime anchor at Sky News.

She is currently a regular presenter of the BBC Radio Wales daily news magazine programmes Good Morning Wales and Good Evening Wales.
