= Jack Hargreaves =

Journalist and broadcaster

Jack Hargreaves OBE
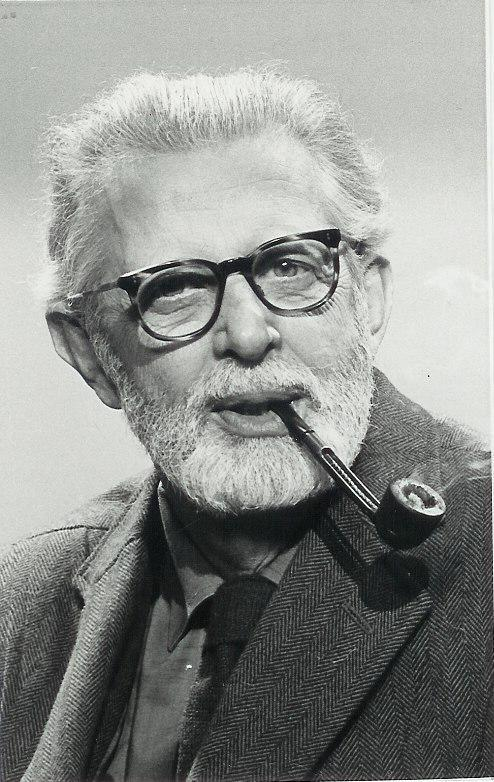
- Born: 31 December 1911; Palmers Green, London, England
- Died: 15 March 1994 (aged 82); The Winterbourne Hospital, Dorchester, Dorset, England
- Occupations: Television presenter; writer

John Herbert Hargreaves OBE (31 December 1911 – 15 March 1994) was an English television presenter and writer whose enduring interest was to comment without nostalgia or sentimentality on accelerating distortions in relations between the city and the countryside, seeking – in entertaining ways – to question and rebut metropolitan assumptions about its character and function. Hargreaves is remembered for appearing on How, a children's programme which he also conceived, about how things worked or ought to work. It ran from 1966 on Southern Television (of which Hargreaves was a director) and networked on ITV until the demise of Southern in 1981.

Hargreaves was the presenter of the weekly magazine programme Out of Town, first broadcast in 1960 following the success of his series Gone Fishing the previous year. Broadcast on Friday evenings on Southern Television the programme was also taken up by many of the other ITV regions, usually in a Sunday afternoon slot. In each episode Hargreaves appeared in short 16mm film reports on some aspect of rural life, usually one in each half of the episode. The films were introduced and narrated by him from a studio set based on the interior of a garden shed.

In 1967, with Ollie Kite he presented Country Boy, a networked children's programme of 20 episodes in which a boy from the city was introduced to the ways of country. Two further series followed in 1969 and 1970. Other programmes he created for local viewers were Farm Progress and a live afternoon series Houseparty. His country programmes continued after the demise of Southern Television with three series of Old Country for Channel 4 between 1983 and 1985.

Hargreaves was involved in the setting up of ITV, and a member of Southern's board of directors, and was employed by the National Farmers' Union, serving on the Nugent Committee (the Defence Lands Committee that investigated which parts of the Ministry of Defence holdings could be returned to private ownership). Hargreaves was appointed Officer of the Order of the British Empire (OBE) in the 1972 New Year Honours. A biography of Hargreaves by Paul Peacock was published in July 2006.

== Early life ==
Born in Edmonton, Middlesex, on 31 December 1911, the son of James Arthur and Ada Hargreaves (née Jubb), Jack was christened John Herbert and was one of three brothers. The family was rooted in Armitage Bridge near Huddersfield in the West Riding of Yorkshire, where at the time of his marriage in 1907 James Hargreaves was a commercial traveller. He based himself partly in London in connection with his work and also to allow his wife the benefits of the capital's midwifery. The brothers attended Merchant Taylors' School, then at the London Charterhouse, in Farringdon, after which Edward and Ronald Hargreaves pursued successful careers in medicine (Ronald became a noted psychiatrist), while in 1928 Jack went to study at the Royal Veterinary College of London University. Hargreaves claimed descent from James Hargreaves, inventor of the spinning jenny.

== Early career ==
On leaving the college, Hargreaves worked as a vet's assistant, but he was soon earning a living as a journalist. He also became a copywriter, and script writer for radio and films, and by the late 1930s he had established a reputation for his pioneering approaches to radio broadcasting.

At the outset of the Second World War, broadcasting was recognised as part of the war effort. Hargreaves' talents in this field meant that he faced being recruited to a restricted post in radio, a reserved occupation. Instead, he joined the Royal Artillery as a gunner, quickly became an NCO, entered the Royal Military College, Sandhurst, and was commissioned in October 1942 into the Royal Tank Regiment. His reputation as a communicator went ahead of him and he was recruited to the staff of General Montgomery to play a role setting up broadcasting services to Allied forces before and after D-Day. He left the army in 1945 with the substantive rank of major, having briefly held the acting rank of lieutenant-colonel.

After the war, Hargreaves continued his media career and during the 1950s was editor of Lilliput magazine and Picture Post where he commissioned work from Bert Hardy. His brilliance as a communications manager led to his being recruited to the National Farmers Union by Jim Turner, later Lord Netherthorpe, who was celebrated for his success as a lobbyist for farmers. Working closely with Turner, Hargreaves organised and developed the NFU's Information Department, founding the British Farmer magazine during an almost intractable crisis of trust between NFU HQ and the members of the largest union in the country, many of whom were experiencing seismic change in the agricultural economy. Hargreaves was deputy programme controller of Southern Television from 1964 to 1976, in which role he devised new programmes.

A lover of angling, Hargreaves was bemused at the way it had become tribalised by class and species, which he blamed on "sociological, technical, financial and Malthusian" causes. He wrote Fishing for a Year (1951), in which he argued for "regression" – the pursuit of different fish, in separate places and by varied methods, throughout the seasons. "What do they know of fishing" he wrote "who know only one fish and one way to fish for him?" Yet his language was seldom so polemic and never adversarial. Hargreaves' style was complemented in this first book by the drawings of his friend Bernard Venables: "It is one of the most excellent provisions of Nature" he wrote in a chapter for the warmest time of the year "that chub are to be angled for on hot summer afternoons ... When the grass is high and full of hum and rustle, when the comfrey blooms along the edge of the water and the air shivers in the heat, the chub lie just under the surface in slacks and corners and eddies all along the bank. You will see them and you will think they have not seen you". His writing and contacts among anglers saw the president of the Piscatorial Society, Sir Robert Saundby, asking Hargreaves to organise the Society's library. With typical thoroughness the collection was removed to Jack's home, later leaving it fully catalogued with not a volume unread. This was when he became sceptical about the opinion of the 17th-century author of The Compleat Angler, Izaak Walton, as to the culinary qualities of the chub – a dish Hargreaves described as "eating cotton wool full of pins and needles".

== The Nugent Report ==
As an independent member of the Defence Lands Committee 1971–73, Hargreaves made key contributions to the Nugent Report, 1973, reviewing the use of land held by the country's armed forces for defence purposes. He became of the opinion that one of the best ways to reserve the countryside for its proper purpose was to keep most people out of it. He believed that although agriculture would be preferable, military exercises seemed less harmful in their impact on the environment than its use for the recreational choices of a predominantly urban population. This was a conundrum he shared wryly with his audience, gently repeating the point, that the countryside, insofar as it had a purpose for humans, was to grow their food in sustainable ways.

== Family ==
Hargreaves with his stepson Simon Baddeley in a trap drawn by Simon's pony, Pewter.

Jack Hargreaves was married, in 1933, to Jeanette Haegler. They had two sons, Mark and Victor; then, after divorce, he married Elisabeth Van de Putte in 1944. Two more sons were born – James Stephen in 1946 and Edward John in 1947. That marriage ended in 1948 when he began a relationship with a journalist from Vogue, Barbara Baddeley.

Living with her until 1963, Hargreaves became a stepfather to Bay and her brother Simon, Barbara's children by the diplomat John Baddeley. He also had a daughter Polly, born in 1957 as a result of a six-year relationship with his secretary Judy Hogg.

In 1965, Hargreaves married Isobel Hatfield (born 12 April 1919). Isobel died four years after her husband on 5 February 1998 and her ashes were scattered with his on Bulbarrow Hill in Dorset, near their home.

== Published film, tapes and DVDs ==
Hargreaves had worked with Steve Wade on How before Southern Television lost its franchise. In 1985 Hargreaves worked with Wade to make 28 new Out of Town episodes for video release. Instead of the studio 'shed' that had been a mainstay of the earlier series, these episodes were made in Hargreaves's real shed at his last home – Raven Cottage, Belchalwell, Dorset.

Using original cut film inserts he had bought from Southern, Hargreaves acquired a Steenbeck editing machine and, with Wade, selected films to be inserted into the new series with new links shot in the shed. They were distributed by Primetime, later Endemol, as VHS tapes and later DVDs.

Hargreaves also authored a number of audio-tapes and long play records on his favourite subjects.

In 2004, a full-length edition of Out of Town, first broadcast on 23 May 1980, was included on a DVD released by ITV Meridian to mark the closing of Southern Television's Southampton studios. Until 2012 this remained the only one of Hargreaves' original broadcast programmes to have been published in any format. The whereabouts of the remaining master tapes was unknown for many years but 34 complete original episodes of Out of Town – broadcast in 1980 and 1981 – eventually came to light, and were made available on DVD.

Hargreaves' stepson, Simon Baddeley, who had been bequeathed rights in his stepfather's books, film and sound footage, purchased Out of Town DVD rights from Endemol, restoring and re-releasing many more broadcasts via his licensee, Network on Air (now defunct). The CEO of Network, Tim Beddows, died in November 2022. Baddeley's contract with Network ended when the company ceased trading in May 2023.

On 28 July 2010, comedians Robert Popper and Peter Serafinowicz added a new narration track to an episode of Out Of Town to create the spoof film Markets of Britain, a short film by Lee Titt.

Talking Pictures TV began broadcasting Out of Town on 5 February 2024. This included all of the surviving Southern Television episodes and the 1985 compilations made for the home video market.

In May 2025 the British free-to-air channel Rewind TV announced that they would be transmitting Old Country from 20 July 2025.

== Bibliography ==
- Jack Hargreaves, illustrated by Bernard Venables, Fishing for a year MacGibbon & Kee 1951, republished Medlar Press 1998
- Jack Hargreaves and others, HOW Annual, Independent Television Books 1975
- Jack Hargreaves, Out of Town: A Life Relived on Television, Dovecote Press 1987
- Jack Hargreaves, The Old Country, Dovecote Press 1988
- Jack Hargreaves with Terry Heathcote, The New Forest: A Portrait in Colour, Dovecote Press 1992
- Paul Peacock, Jack Hargreaves – A Portrait, Farming Books & Videos 2006
- Report of the Defence Lands Committee 1971–73. Chairman: The Rt Hon The Lord Nugent of Guildford. Cmnd.5714. London:HMSO 1973
- Colin Willock, The Gun Punt Adventure, new edition, Tideline Books 1988
