= Just One More Kiss (Renée and Renato song) =

Single by Renée and Renato
- B-side: "It's a Lovely Day"
- Released: January 1983
- Genre: Pop
- Length: 2:51
- Label: Hollywood
- Songwriter: J Edward

Renée and Renato singles chronology
"Save Your Love" (1982)	"Just One More Kiss" (1983)	"A Littla Bitta Me" (1983)

"Just One More Kiss" is a 1983 Renée and Renato song. The song reached No.48 in the UK charts.
