= Fred Dinenage =

English television presenter and author (born 1942)

Fred Dinenage MBE
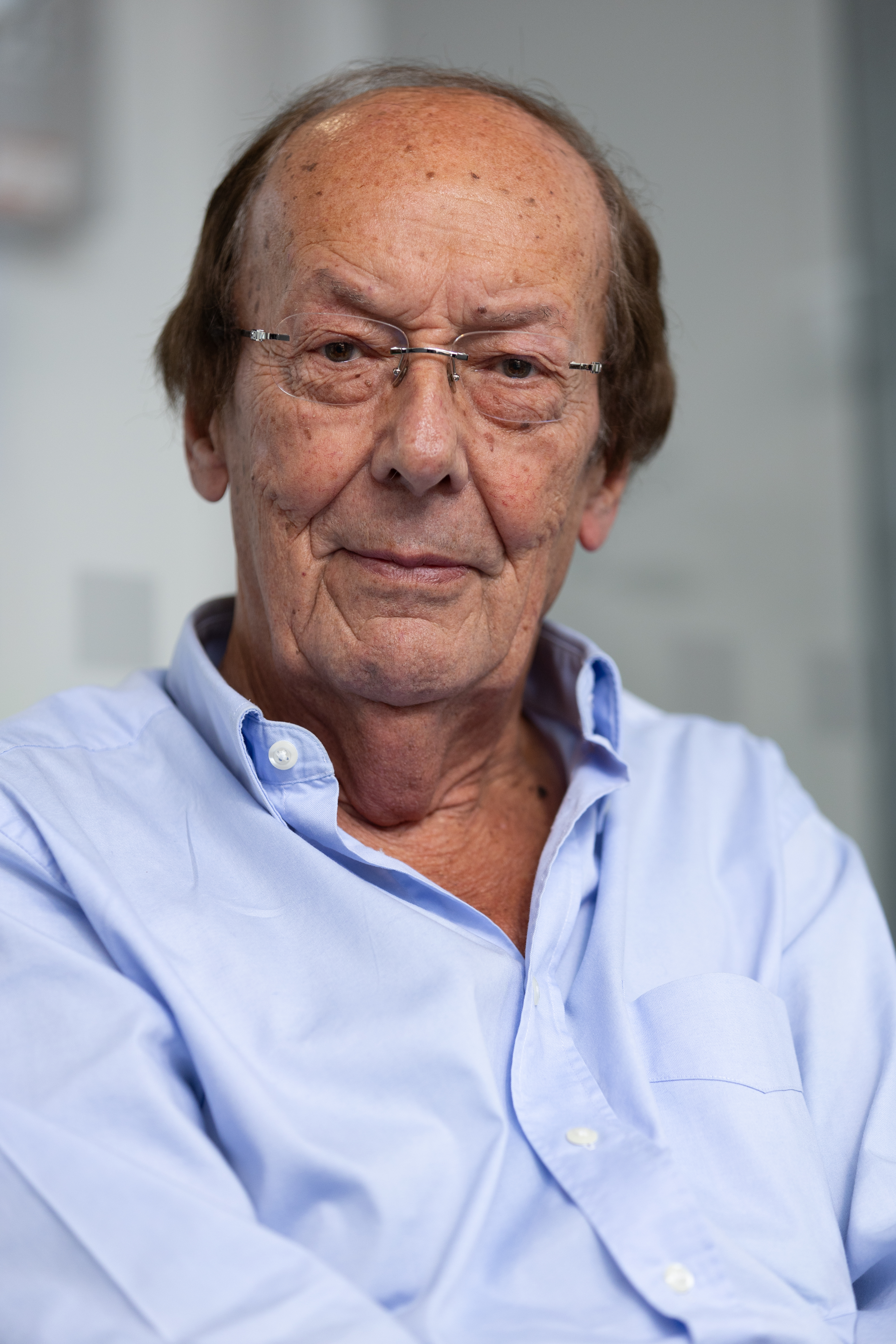
- Dinenage in 2026
- Born: Frederick Edgar Dinenage; 8 June 1942 (age 84); Birmingham, England
- Occupations: Journalist; broadcaster
- Years active: 1964–present
- Known for: Presenting How, How 2, ITV News Meridian
- Spouse: Beverley Summers (m. 1967)
- Children: 3 including Caroline Sarah and Chris

Frederick Edgar Dinenage MBE (/ˈdaɪnɪdʒ/ DYE-nij; born 8 June 1942) is an English author, broadcaster and television presenter. His television career has spanned over 60 years, including the long-running children's programme How and ITV's regional programming in the south of England. Dinenage retired from presenting regional news on ITV Meridian on 16 December 2021, after 38 years as a news anchor.

== Early life and education ==
Dinenage was born in Birmingham.

== Career ==
Dinenage has appeared as presenter of many British television programmes (many of them produced by Southern Television, and its successors TVS and Meridian Broadcasting), such as Tell The Truth, How and its successor How 2, as well as the BBC quiz show Pass The Buck and Gambit (produced by Anglia).

=== News anchor ===
Dinenage began his career at Southern Television in 1964, as a presenter on Three Go Round, a part-networked children's programme, alongside actress Diane Keen and future television producer Britt Allcroft.

Dinenage transferred from Southern to TVS in January 1982, chiefly as a sports presenter and reporter, working on Coast to Coast, Sportshow and The Saturday Match.

In October 2021, it was announced that Dinenage would step down from ITV, after 38 years as a news anchor in the south of England. His final edition of ITV News Meridian aired on 16 December 2021.

=== Other work ===
Dinenage spent a brief period in the late 1970s covering regional sport for Yorkshire Television. He also appeared as a relief presenter of the networked ITV Saturday afternoon show, World of Sport.

Dinenage has written several non-fiction books, including ghosting on autobiographies My Story and Our Story for the Kray twins. Fred Dinenage: Murder Casebook, a crime documentary series on 20th century murders, was first broadcast on the Crime & Investigation Network in 2011. He has also narrated Most Evil Killers for Pick since 2017.

He is a keen football follower and was on the board of directors at Portsmouth F.C. between 1998 and 2007.

Dinenage was appointed Member of the Order of the British Empire (MBE) in the 2010 Birthday Honours, for services to broadcasting.

On 16 October 2020, it was announced Dinenage would appear in a new series of How, alongside Vick Hope, Sam Homewood and Frankie Vu.

== Personal life ==
Dinenage's oldest daughter Caroline Dinenage is the Conservative member of Parliament for Gosport.
