= Southern Television =

ITV regional TV station (1958–1982)

- The Southern region when it lost its franchise in 1981
- Type: Region of television network
- Branding: Southern
- Country: England
- First air date: 30 August 1958; 68 years ago
- Motto: The Station that serves the South
- TV transmitters: Rowridge; Dover; Hannington; Midhurst; Whitehawk Hill; Chillerton Down; Heathfield
- Headquarters: Southampton
- Broadcast area: South and South East England
- Owner: Rank Organisation, Associated Newspapers & D. C. Thomson & Co.
- Dissolved: 31 December 1981; 44 years ago (after 23 years, 123 days)
- Picture format: PAL 625 lines via UHF; Black and white 405 lines via VHF
- Affiliation: ITV
- Language: English
- Replaced by: Television South

Southern Television was the ITV broadcasting licence holder for the South and South-East of England from 30 August 1958 to 31 December 1981. The company was launched as 'Southern Television Limited'. However, in 1966, during the application process for contracts running from 1968, the company renamed itself 'Southern Independent Television Limited', a title which was used until 1980 when the company reverted to its original corporate name. Southern Television ceased broadcasting on the morning of 1 January 1982 at 12:43, after a review during the 1980 franchise round gave the contract to Television South.

== Launch ==
When the Independent Television Authority (ITA) advertised for applicants to run the south of England station in 1958, Southern Television beat eight other applicants for the contract. Its initial shareholders were Associated Newspapers, the Rank Organisation and the Amalgamated Press, each holding one third of the company. Associated Newspapers was allowed to remain a shareholder in Southern, only on the condition that it sold its remaining 10% stake in Associated-Rediffusion to avoid owning parts of two ITV companies; the Amalgamated Press dropped out of the consortium before the station went on air. This led to Associated Newspapers and Rank increasing their stakes to 37.5% each, and D. C. Thomson & Co. Ltd taking the remaining 25%.

Southern Television was the ninth ITA franchise to launch, beginning transmissions on 30 August 1958 at 5:30 p.m. with the first playing of Southern Rhapsody, the station theme which was used to begin each day's transmission until 31 December 1981, written by composer Richard Addinsell and performed by the Bournemouth Symphony Orchestra, with Addinsell himself conducting. The first presenter on air was continuity announcer Meryl O'Keefe (later to become a BBC announcer); her first on-air announcement was followed by an outside broadcast link-up fronted by Julian Pettifer (later a war correspondent) and a regional news bulletin read by Martin Muncaster.

Other opening night programmes included a Filmed Playhouse drama entitled The Last Reunion, a preview programme called Coming Shortly, an episode of the American crime drama Highway Patrol and a networked opening night programme entitled Southern Rhapsody, starring Gracie Fields and the Lionel Blair Dancers, televised from the station's studios in a converted cinema in the Northam area of Southampton and the ocean liner Caronia, which was berthed in Southampton docks.

== Programming ==
Regular programmes produced by Southern Television included the regional news magazine Day by Day, presented by Cliff Michelmore, Christopher Peacock, Barry Westwood, Peter Clark, and long-serving weather forecaster Trevor Baker; Out of Town, a countryside programme introduced by Jack Hargreaves, who would later join Southern Television's board of directors; How, a children's science programme also featuring Hargreaves along with Fred Dinenage, Bunty James (later replaced by Marian Davies) and Jon Miller; Freewheelers, a children's spy series; Winston Churchill: The Wilderness Years and Worzel Gummidge, starring Jon Pertwee as the eponymous walking scarecrow. Houseparty was a magazine show made in the style of a fly on the wall observation of participants' daily get-togethers, with regular guests including Cherry Marshall. Southern Television also produced a programme aimed at the farming community, presented by Mark Jenner, Farm Progress was broadcast at around 10:30 on Sunday mornings. A late-night epilogue was introduced by Roger Royle. Alongside 'Trevor the Weather', weather forecasts were also presented by Cyril Ockenden.

Generally, the company produced more networked children's programmes than shows for adults, scoring a particularly strong seller internationally with an adaptation of Enid Blyton's The Famous Five. Also worth noting was the children's programme The Saturday Banana, hosted by Bill Oddie (then one of The Goodies) which saw the placing of a 20-foot-high (6.1 m) fibreglass banana outside the studios, supported by its peeled 'skin'. Southern also produced the children's game show Runaround which was hosted by Mike Reid.

The broadcaster was known for its enlightened classical music broadcasting, including studio concerts by the local Bournemouth Symphony Orchestra in Music in Camera. From 1972, Southern Television broadcast up to two operas from Glyndebourne each season, some of which have since been issued on DVD.

The Southern Television archive passed to Primetime who were later acquired by Australian company Southern Star (now Banijay's Endemol Shine Australia), which later sold it to Renown Pictures, which shows some of the content on its own channel Talking Pictures TV, including Southern soap opera Together; amongst other old film libraries that Renown owns, Euroarts own Southern's music output including its Glyndebourne operas.

In its last three years on the air Southern showed many foreign-language films in its Friday Late, Late Show, including as many as eight by Rainer Werner Fassbinder and others by Werner Herzog, Andrzej Wajda, Wim Wenders, Federico Fellini and many more.

== Studios ==
=== Southampton ===
The station's original studios were in a converted cinema, the Plaza, in Northam, Southampton.

With the advent of colour in 1969, the company moved to purpose-built new studios next door to the existing site, built on land reclaimed from the River Itchen.

The studios at Northam were sold on to TVS in 1981, and sold again by TVS to Meridian Broadcasting in 1992. Meridian relocated to a much smaller office building in Whiteley in 2004, and the site at Northam was sold to developers. The studio complex was demolished in 2010. Blocks of flats have now been erected on the site.

=== Dover ===
The company also ran production offices and a studio in Dover, to serve the eastern part of its region. The studio was opened in 1961, after the ITA's VHF Dover television transmitter went into operation the year before. The studio on Russell Street was mainly used for regional news production although some non-news programmes including the long-running rural affairs series Farm Progress, feature series and documentaries such as Elusive Butterflies and Dougalling and the nightly Epilogue (known for years as Guideline) were also produced from Dover.

During Southern's tenure as the ITV franchise broadcaster, the company strived to produce dedicated opt outs for the east of the region – the first British television service of its kind. Southern's South East news team in Dover produced separate bulletins for the area as an opt-out into the Day by Day programme each weeknight. A dedicated South East bulletin was also broadcast after News at Ten. More well known to South East viewers was Scene South East, a weekly magazine programme introduced on 9 October 1964 as Friday on Ten (so named due to its transmission on VHF Channel 10), and which replaced Day by Day on Friday nights. Its popularity led to the introduction of a shorter Scene Midweek programme on Wednesdays from 1977 onwards. Local commercials specific to the region were also broadcast to the Dover transmitter only, via the presentation control area at the Southampton studios.

Dover-based presenters and reporters included Mike Field, Jeff Thomas, Malcolm Mitchell, Tim Brinton, Simon Theobalds, Arnie Wilson, Jill Cochrane, Derek Williamson, Pat Sloman, David Haigh (editor of Scene South East), Donald Dougall and Mike Fuller. The Dover studio directors were David Pick and Maurice Harper. The floor manager was John Heather and the production assistant was Gillie Slaven. During the transition from Southern TV to TVS, two production secretaries were appointed, Gwenneth Hughes and Denise Hood.

After Southern lost its franchise to TVS, the studios were used to produce the successor's regional news programmes for the South East — Coast to Coast and TVS News. Once TVS's studios in Maidstone were opened, the Dover studios were closed in 1983 and demolished a year later. The site is now a car park.

=== Other facilities ===
Unique in ITV and reflecting the area's maritime history the company converted a Second World War motor torpedo boat into a floating outside broadcasting unit named Southerner.

There were regional offices in Maidstone, Dorchester, Brighton and Reading. There were also sales offices at Stag Place, London and Oxford Street, Manchester.

== Identity ==
Southern Television's logo is sometimes said to be a compass (with the directional station name and the fact that the bottom point on the logo is longest suggesting a compass pointing south in the direction of Southern Television's service area); however, the general consensus is that it is a star, named after the Southern Star and because Southern Television's final transmission showed the logo zooming off into the night sky. For the purposes of this article, the logo will be referred to as a star, to reflect what it is most popularly called.

Southern Television's first identity featured an art deco style star which zoomed into screen before the bottom point extended downwards with varying tones. This was replaced in the early 1960s with a white rotating star against a black background against a drumroll jingle. This was again altered in the mid-1960s to the familiar star shape against a black background and accompanied by a jingle featuring a cacophony of noises. This shape formed from a circle, with the diagonal lines moving out and joining the circle and the horizontal and vertical lines being drawn last, with the name added last.

This ident remained with the station until the end of its existence with some modifications; firstly the jingle was altered to nine notes on a guitar a few years later, and then the background was revealed to be blue in 1969 with the introduction of colour (blue was the background colour of the ident as used in black and white; being shot with black background and white star would have given too much contrast and overexposed the camera). This ident with blue background colour was maintained after the introduction of colour transmissions because this still provided a good contrast on black and white TV sets. This ident, occasionally supplemented by a subsequent caption stating, 'The Station that serves the South', lasted until the company ceased transmission in 1982.

In addition to these idents, a clock was used featuring a blue background and Southern legend, and for introducing links between programmes, in-vision continuity was utilised often. Continuity announcers included:

- Brian Nissen (transferred to TVS in 1982)
- Christopher Robbie (transferred to TVS in 1982)
- Keith Martin
- Gill Hewitt
- Verity Martindill

== 1980 franchise round ==
The 1980 Independent Television franchise round required Southern Television to re-apply to the Independent Broadcasting Authority (IBA) to continue to broadcast to the South and South East of England from 1982. Competitive applications were lodged from rival companies, and in December 1980, Southern Television lost its franchise to Television South (TVS), a newly formed consortium. The IBA decision angered the Southern board, suggesting the station's non-local ownership swayed the decision against it. The incumbent's complacency may have been a factor, its application a mere 16 pages long. The IBA invited Southern Television to re-submit, asking the company to go into more depth.

TVS used portable office buildings (popularly known as Portakabins, a brand name) in Southern's car park as a temporary measure until Southern finally agreed to lease its studio buildings for production of programmes ahead of the franchise changeover. In Southern Television's final productions, Day by Yesterday and And It's Goodbye From Us, a song was featured, composed and performed by Richard Stilgoe, deriding the incoming TVS as "Portakabin TV" and mocking TVS for choosing Maidstone as a production base in the newly enlarged dual region. This was despite Southern Television itself having already purchased a site at Vinters Park in Maidstone for a planned studio complex had it retained its franchise. Southern Television sold the land on to TVS at a profit.

== Closure of Southern Television and Aftermath ==
Southern Television's final programme And It's Goodbye From Us started at 11:45 p.m. and ended at 12:43 a.m. on New Year's Day 1982. The programme closed with a medley of songs sung by Lillian Watson and performed by the Bournemouth Sinfonietta under conductor Owain Arwel Hughes. The show's presenter and long-serving continuity announcer Christopher Robbie, signed off from Southern Television with these words:

Goodbye songs from Lillian Watson because ... it's goodbye time. We said at the start that we'd come to celebrate, and I think we have. We've enjoyed remembering, and I'm sure you won't forget. So, with a final farewell smile from those Southern people who've become to many of you, true friends, it's goodbye from us.

Afterwards, the camera panned to show many of the on-air talent and company executives standing solemnly as their names were displayed on-screen and the "Southern Fantasia" (composed especially for the show by Jonathan Burton, and performed earlier on in the programme) was played in the final two minutes. When the piece came to a climactic end, the lights on the set were gradually turned off, for the last time, fading to the Southern Television Colour Production slide which dissolved into the station's logo, spinning away into an animated starry sky.

The acoustic guitar jingle played for what would be the final time with a deep extended echo, and the screen slowly and silently faded to black, remaining that way for close to a minute. There were no closing or shut-down announcements, no suggestions for viewers to switch off their television sets, nor even the customary playing of the national anthem.

At 12:45 a.m. the transmitters were shut down, putting a permanent end to Southern's broadcasts after 24 years. 8 hours and 40 minutes later, at 9:25 a.m., Television South began broadcasting in Southern's former region.

Southern Television's programme archive was sold to Southern Star Group and then Renown Pictures; the names "Southern Television Ltd", "Southern Independent Television" and "Southern Television", and the star device idents used between 1958 and 1981, all transferred to Art Attack and Finger Tips producer Nic Ayling in 2004. Southern Television now trades as an independent production company.

In August 2008, ITV Meridian commemorated the 50th anniversary of Southern Television's first transmission with special reports on Thames Valley Tonight and Meridian Tonight (South and South East editions) alongside a half-hour programme presented by Fred Dinenage.

In 2022, Renown Pictures/Talking Pictures TV put many of the programmes from their Southern TV archive onto their TPTV Encore streaming service. Programmes uploaded to TPTV Encore include Runaround, Rogue's Rock and Tell Me Another.

== See also ==
- Television South, Southern Television's successor.
- ITV Meridian, the current incumbent of the South franchise.
- ITV (TV network)
- History of ITV
- Hannington transmitting station, the site of a famous Southern Television broadcast interruption by person or persons unknown in 1977.
- Timeline of Southern Television

ITV regional service
New service	South & South East England; 30 August 1958 – 31 December 1981	Succeeded by TVS
